= 2017 Reno 1868 FC season =

Reno 1868 FC
2017 season
- President: Herbert Simon
- Head coach: Ian Russell
- Stadium: Greater Nevada Field
- USL: Conference: 12th Overall: 23rd
- USL Cup: TBD
- U.S. Open Cup: Third round
- Biggest win: RNO 9–0 LA (7/31)
- Biggest defeat: SA 4–0 RNO (4/15)
Home colors	Away colors

The 2017 Reno 1868 FC season was the club's inaugural season of existence, and their first in the United Soccer League, the second tier of American soccer.

== Background ==
Ahead of the 2017 season, there had been three professional soccer clubs in Northern Nevada: Reno Rattlers, Northern Nevada Aces, and Nevada Wonders. The announcement of an expansion franchise to join the USL was announced in September 2015.

The club's named was decided with a contest known as "USL Reno 2017". Nearly 5,000 entries were submitted, followed by fans choosing from amongst the top six names: Reno FC, FC Reno, Reno Silver FC, Reno City FC, Reno United, or Reno 1868. The fans response refined the contest down to three finalists—Reno FC, Reno United, and Reno 1868—with the winner being Reno 1868, a nod to the founding year of the City of Reno.

On June 29, 2016, the club announced a two-year partnership with the San Jose Earthquakes of MLS. It was also stated that San Jose would have control over the technical side of the club. The team hired Earthquakes Assistant Coach Ian Russell as Head Coach on November 22, 2016.

== Squad ==
No.	Name	Nationality	Position	Date of birth (age)	Previous club
Goalkeepers
1	Russ Klabough	(United States)	GK	November 11, 1990 (aged 26)	(United States) Stanislaus State Warriors
12	Matt Bersano	(United States)	GK	September 10, 1992 (aged 25)	(United States) San Jose Earthquakes
Defenders
4	Jordan Murrell	(Canada)	LB	May 2, 1993 (aged 24)	(United States) Pittsburgh Riverhounds
5	Nick von Niederhäusern	(Switzerland)	DF	September 28, 1989 (aged 28)	(Liechtenstein) Vaduz
6	Thomas Janjigian	(United States)	LB	November 10, 1994 (aged 22)	(United States) FC Golden State Force
15	Jimmy Ockford	(United States)	CB	June 10, 1992 (aged 25)	(United States) Seattle Sounders FC
16	Brent Richards	(United States)	RB	May 20, 1990 (aged 27)	(United States) Portland Timbers 2
18	Kip Colvey	(New Zealand)	RB	March 15, 1994 (aged 23)	(United States) San Jose Earthquakes
23	Brenton Griffiths	(Jamaica)	CB	February 9, 1991 (aged 26)	(United States) Orange County SC
Midfielders
2	Jackson Yueill	(United States)	CM	March 19, 1997 (aged 20)	(United States) San Jose Earthquakes
7	Jordan Roberts	(England)	CM	January 2, 1993 (aged 24)	(United States) Saint Louis FC
10	Junior Burgos	(El Salvador)	AM	August 14, 1988 (aged 29)	(United States) Atlanta United FC
11	Anibal Echeverria	(El Salvador)	CM	September 5, 1987 (aged 30)	(United States) Turlock Express
14	Chris Wehan	(United States)	LM	January 29, 1994 (aged 23)	(United States) New Mexico Lobos
17	Lindo Mfeka	(South Africa)	CM	March 29, 1994 (aged 23)	(United States) San Jose Earthquakes
20	Matt LaGrassa	(United States)	LM	January 27, 1993 (aged 24)	(United States) Sacramento Republic FC
38	Matheus Silva	(Brazil)	MF	December 8, 1996 (aged 20)	(United States) San Jose Earthquakes
84	Seth Casiple	(United States)	RM	August 23, 1993 (aged 24)	(United States) Portland Timbers 2
96	Luis Fernandes	(United States)	CM	January 29, 1996 (aged 21)	(United States) Fort Lauderdale Strikers
Forwards
8	Mackenzie Pridham	(Canada)	LF	August 13, 1990 (aged 27)	(United States) Sacramento Republic
9	Dane Kelly	(Jamaica)	ST	February 9, 1991 (aged 26)	(United States) Swope Park Rangers
19	Dembakwi Yomba	(Sierra Leone) / (United States)	CF	September 4, 1996 (aged 21)	(United States) Orlando City B
29	Antoine Hoppenot	(France)	RF	November 23, 1990 (aged 26)	(United States) FC Cincinnati

Player's age during the 2017 season..
On loan from MLS affiliate San Jose Earthquakes.

== Non-competitive ==
=== Preseason ===
February 18	Reno 1868 FC	0–1	San Jose Earthquakes	Reno, Nevada
12:30 PST		Report	Thompson 40'	Stadium: Greater Nevada Field; Attendance: 6,289

March 11	Reno 1868 FC	3–3	Sacramento Republic FC	Reno, Nevada
16:00 PST	Pridham 42', 87'; Kelly 66'	Report	Caesar 17', 19'; Ochoa 27'	Stadium: Greater Nevada Field; Attendance: 4,554

=== Midseason friendlies ===
July 8	Reno 1868 FC (United States)	v	(Mexico) Atlas	Reno, Nevada
19:30 PST				Stadium: Greater Nevada Field

== Competitive ==
=== USL ===
==== Standings ====
Pos	Team	Pld	W	D	L	GF	GA	GD	Pts	Qualification
1	Real Monarchs (X)	32	20	7	5	59	31	+28	67	Conference Playoffs
2	San Antonio FC	32	17	11	4	45	24	+21	62	Conference Playoffs
3	Reno 1868 FC	32	17	8	7	75	39	+36	59	Conference Playoffs
4	Swope Park Rangers	32	17	7	8	55	37	+18	58	Conference Playoffs
5	Phoenix Rising FC	32	17	7	8	50	37	+13	58	Conference Playoffs

Source: 2017 USL standings
Rules for classification: 1) total wins; 2) total goal differential; 3) total goals scored; 4) points earned against top four Conference finishers; 5) disciplinary points; 6) coin toss or drawing of lots
(X) Regular Season League Champion

==== Results ====
March 25 1	Reno 1868 FC	0–2	Orange County SC	Reno, Nevada
19:00 PST	Matheus Silva (yellow card) 29'	Report	Lacroix 31', 45+1'; Pineda (yellow card) 81'	Stadium: Greater Nevada Field; Attendance: 5,691; Referee: Victor Rivas

April 1 2	Reno 1868 FC	1–1	Whitecaps FC 2	Reno, Nevada
19:00 PST	Griffiths 4'; Casiple (yellow card) 88'	Report	Sanner 8'; Flores (yellow card) 14'; Wynne (yellow card) 90+3'	Stadium: Greater Nevada Field; Attendance: 4,430; Referee: Joe Dickerson

April 6 3	Real Monarchs	5–3	Reno 1868 FC	Sandy, Utah
18:00 PST	Minter 14'; Velásquez 26'; Hoffman 34'; Orozco (yellow card) 41'; Curinga 43'; Moberg (yellow card) 54'; Hernández 90+2'	Report	Pridham 39'; Hoppenot (yellow card) 78'; Kelly 84', 87'	Stadium: Rio Tinto Stadium; Attendance: 2,316; Referee: Younes Marrakchi

April 15 4	San Antonio FC	4–0	Reno 1868 FC	San Antonio, Texas
18:00 PST	Forbes 34'; Elizondo 67', 79'; Pecka (yellow card) 69'; Castillo 90+2' (pen.)	Report		Stadium: Toyota Field; Attendance: 6,403; Referee: Tyler Mitcham

April 22 5	Reno 1868 FC	2–2	Colorado Springs Switchbacks FC	Reno, Nevada
19:00 PST	Burgos 45' (pen.); Murrell (yellow card) 45+2' (goal) 60'	Report	McFarlane (yellow card) 52'; Burt 58'; Malcolm 90+1'	Stadium: Greater Nevada Field; Attendance: 4,881; Referee: Malik Badawi

May 6 6	Phoenix Rising FC	0–4	Reno 1868 FC	Tempe, Arizona
19:00 PST		Report	Kelly 2', 6', 66' (yellow card) 66'; Mfeka (yellow card) 74'; Wehan 76'	Stadium: Phoenix Rising FC Soccer Complex; Attendance: 6,067; Referee: Joe Dickerson

May 20 7	Reno 1868 FC	6–0	Seattle Sounders FC 2	Reno, Nevada
19:30 PST	Kelly 28', 32' (pen.), 35' (pen.); Mfeka 44'; Casiple 48'; Ockford (yellow card) 80' (goal) 90+2'	Report	Ele (yellow card) 30' (yellow-red card) 34'	Stadium: Greater Nevada Field; Attendance: 5,711; Referee: Chipalo Street

May 24 8	Reno 1868 FC	4–0	Tulsa Roughnecks FC	Reno, Nevada
19:30 PST	Mfeka (yellow card) 24' (goal) 62'; Casiple (yellow card) 37'; Ockford 43'; Kelly 57'; Hoppenot 67' (yellow card) 71'; Fernandes (yellow card) 75'	Report	Mata (yellow card) 16'; Corrales (yellow card) 55'; Caffa (yellow card) 57'	Stadium: Greater Nevada Field; Attendance: 4,418; Referee: Farhad Dadkho

May 27 9	Colorado Springs Switchbacks FC	3–3	Reno 1868 FC	Colorado Springs, Colorado
17:00 PST	Argueta (yellow card) 55'; Burt 57', 88'; Prugh (yellow card) 58'	Report	Hoppenot 37', 85'; Kelly 42' (yellow card) 55'; Murrell (yellow card) 61'; Griffiths (yellow card) 69'; LaGrassa (yellow card) 71'	Stadium: Weidner Field; Attendance: 3,046; Referee: Ramy Touchan

June 7 10	Reno 1868 FC	3–2	Rio Grande Valley FC	Reno, Nevada
19:30 PST	Kelly 22'; Fernandes 66'; Richards 77'	Report	Rodriguez 20'; Sagel (yellow card) 70'; Wharton (yellow card) 72'; Bird 74' (pen.)	Stadium: Greater Nevada Field; Attendance: 4,844; Referee: Victor Rivas

June 10 11	Reno 1868 FC	2–0	Sacramento Republic FC	Reno, Nevada
19:30 PST	Hoppenot 38'; Ockford (yellow card) 56'; Kelly 73'	Report	James (yellow card) 14'; Barrera (yellow card) 64'	Stadium: Greater Nevada Field; Attendance: 6,060; Referee: Ekaterina Koroleva

June 19 12	Real Monarchs	2–1	Reno 1868 FC	Sandy, Utah
18:00 PST	Brody 22'; Peay 45+3'; Besler (yellow card) 90'; Velásquez (yellow card) 90+6'	Report	Mfeka (yellow card) 18'; Hoppenot 34'; Ockford (yellow card) 80'	Stadium: Rio Tinto Stadium; Attendance: 2,321; Referee: Robi Hullner

June 24 13	Portland Timbers 2	0–2	Reno 1868 FC	Portland, Oregon
19:00 PST		Report	Casiple 55'; Fernandes 82'	Stadium: Merlo Field; Attendance: 1,993; Referee: Michael Radchuk

June 30 14	Reno 1868 FC	0–0	Phoenix Rising FC	Reno, Nevada
19:30 PST	Brown (yellow card) 86'	Report	Wakasa (yellow card) 34'; Drogba (yellow card) 90+4'	Stadium: Greater Nevada Field; Attendance: 7,092; Referee: Rosendo Mendoza

July 3 15	Reno 1868 FC	9–0	LA Galaxy II	Reno, Nevada
19:30 PST	Castellanos 3' (o.g.); Kelly 8'; Murrell 11', 49' (yellow card) 61'; Griffiths (yellow card) 22'; Hoppenot 25' (pen.); LaGrassa 66'; Wehan 76', 84'; Brown (yellow card) 78'; Espinal 88'	Report	Covarrubias (yellow card) 82'	Stadium: Greater Nevada Field; Attendance: 5,140; Referee: Victor Rivas

July 15 16	Whitecaps FC 2	1–1	Reno 1868 FC	UEL, British Columbia
19:00 PST	Gardner (yellow card) 62'; Bevan (yellow card) 83' de Vries (yellow card) 85'	Report	Brown 73'; Murrell (yellow card) 81'	Stadium: Thunderbird Stadium; Attendance: 1,788; Referee: Alian Ruch

July 22 17	Reno 1868 FC	1–1	Portland Timbers 2	Reno, Nevada
19:00 PST	LaGrassa (yellow card) 42'; Hoppenot (yellow card) 64'; Fernandes (yellow card) 65'; Casiple 71'	Report	McIntosh (yellow card) 52'; Calixtro (yellow card) 83'	Stadium: Greater Nevada Field; Attendance: 6,027; Referee: Benjamin Oakley

July 30 18	Swope Park Rangers	1–4	Reno 1868 FC	Kansas City, Missouri
00:00 PST	Hernandez 60'; Duke 68'	Report	Hoppenot 1'; Kelly (yellow card) 34' (goal) 76'; Fernandes 45'; Bersano (yellow card) 45+2'; Mfeka (yellow card) 64'; Murrell (yellow card) 66'; Casiple 90'	Stadium: Swope Soccer Village; Attendance: 989; Referee: Alejandro Mariscal

August 2 19	OKC Energy FC	1–0	Reno 1868 FC	Oklahoma City, Oklahoma
21:00 PST	Barril (yellow card) 29'; Angulo 62'	Report	Alashe (red card) 29'	Stadium: Taft Stadium; Attendance: 2,650; Referee: Luis Guardia

August 5 20	Tulsa Roughnecks FC	2–3	Reno 1868 FC	Tulsa, Oklahoma
17:30 PDT	Caffa 52', (yellow card) 64'; Corrales (yellow card) 58'; Svantesson 67'	Report	Hoppenot 19', (yellow card) 84'; Kelly 26'; Fernandes (yellow card) 52'; Wehan 84'	Stadium: ONEOK Field; Attendance: 3,798; Referee: D. Djurasevic

August 12 21	Reno 1868 FC	2–0	San Antonio FC	Reno, Nevada
00:00 PST	Fernandes 25'; Brown 70'	Report	Ibeagha (yellow card) 23'; Newnam (yellow card) 59'; Tyrpak (yellow card) 60'; Rodriguez (yellow card) 67'; Elizondo (yellow card) 79'; O'Ojong (yellow card) 80'; Forbes (penalty missed) 83'; Ajeakwa (yellow card) 90+1'	Stadium: Greater Nevada Field; Attendance: 5,847; Referee: Malik Badawi

August 19 22	Sacramento Republic FC	1–2	Reno 1868 FC	Sacramento, California
20:00 PDT	Partain 15'	Report	Kelly 17'; Wehan 22'	Stadium: Papa Murphy's Park; Attendance: 11,569; Referee: Chipalo Street

August 26 23	Reno 1868 FC	1–0	Swope Park Rangers	Reno, Nevada
19:30 PST	Hoppenot 10' (pen.); Ockford (yellow card) 58'; Griffiths (red card) 87'; Fernandes (yellow card) 90+4'	Report	Zendejas (yellow card) 18'; Didic (yellow card) 68'; Ballo (yellow card) 86'; Kuzain (yellow card) 90+2'; Saad (red card) 90+4'	Stadium: Greater Nevada Field; Referee: Robi Hullner

September 2 24	Orange County SC	1–3	Reno 1868 FC	Irvine, California
19:00 PDT	Sorto (yellow card) 11'; Parra (yellow card) 35'; Kobayashi (yellow card) 48'; Abolaji (red card) 56'; Etim 90+1'	Report	Ockford 13'; Sorto 15' (o.g.); Murrell (yellow card) 37'; Wehan 67'	Stadium: Anteater Stadium; Attendance: 2,017; Referee: Alex Chilowicz

September 6 25	LA Galaxy II	1–2	Reno 1868 FC	Carson, California
19:30 PST	Mendiola 37'; Smith (yellow card) 62'; Turner (yellow card) 83'	Report	Richards 5'; LaGrassa (yellow card) 26'; Espinal 66'; Ockford (yellow card) 90+1'	Stadium: StubHub Center Track Stadium; Referee: Daniel Radford

September 9 26	Seattle Sounders FC 2	1–1	Reno 1868 FC	Tukwila, Washington
19:00 PDT	Mathers 1'; Ele (yellow card) 24'	Report	Ockford (yellow card) 21'; Brown 38'; Pelosi (yellow card) 85'	Stadium: Starfire Sports Stadium; Attendance: 1,129; Referee: Mike Hohnholz

September 16 27	Rio Grande Valley FC	1–0	Reno 1868 FC	Edinburg, Texas
17:30 PST	Bilyeu 32' (pen.); García (yellow card) 90+7'	Report	Hoppenot (yellow card) 24'; Bersano (yellow card) 31'; Kelly (red card) 79'	Stadium: H-E-B Park; Attendance: 6,169; Referee: William Hale

September 20 28	Reno 1868 FC	3–0	OKC Energy FC	Reno, Nevada
00:00 PST	Mfeka 18', 50', 62'; Burgos (yellow card) 90'	Report	Brown (yellow card) 60'; Guzmán (yellow card) 64'	Stadium: Greater Nevada Field; Attendance: 6,001; Referee: Timothy Ford

September 23 29	Reno 1868 FC	6–1	Portland Timbers 2	Reno, Nevada
00:00 PST	Kelly 10', 13'; Mfeka 32'; Hoppenot 49', 59'; Pridham 61'	Report	Hanson (yellow card) 24'; Batista (yellow card) 59'; Ornstil 73'; Lowe (yellow card) 87'	Stadium: Greater Nevada Field; Attendance: 5,640; Referee: Benjamin Oakley

September 30 30	Reno 1868 FC	0–3	Real Monarchs	Reno, Nevada
00:00 PST	Hoppenot (penalty missed) 24'; Murrell (yellow card) 64'	Report	Brody (yellow card) 43'; Hoffman 47'; Velásquez (yellow card) 70'; Besler (yellow card) 77'; Mare 86'; Haber 89'	Stadium: Greater Nevada Field; Attendance: 6,598; Referee: Malik Badawi

October 7 31	Orange County SC	1–4	Reno 1868 FC	Irvine, California
00:00 PST	Kobayashi (yellow card) 57'; Parra 71'	Report	Ockford 30'; Fernandes 65'; Wehan 81' (pen.) (yellow card) 89'; Pridham 85'; Mfeka (yellow card) 90+2'	Stadium: Anteater Stadium; Attendance: 4,229; Referee: Joseph Dickerson

October 14 32	Reno 1868 FC	2–2	Sacramento Republic FC	Reno, Nevada
00:00 PST	Wehan 41'; Hoppenot 51'; Bersano (yellow card) 65'; LaGrassa (yellow card) 82'	Report	Ochoa 16', (yellow card) 48', (goal) 67'; Christian (yellow card) 53'	Stadium: Greater Nevada Field; Attendance: 6,144; Referee: Jason Hutchinson

=== USL Playoffs ===
==== First round ====
October 21 First Round	Reno 1868 FC	0–1	OKC Energy FC	Reno, Nevada
17:45 PST	Wehan (yellow card) 32'	Report	Wojcik 41', (yellow card) 90+1'	Stadium: Greater Nevada Field; Attendance: 4,342; Referee: Victor Rivas

=== U.S. Open Cup ===
May 17 Second round	OSA FC (Washington (state))	1–1 (a.e.t.) (3–4 p)	(Nevada) Reno 1868 FC	Tukwila, Washington
7:30 PM PDT	Gordley 14'	Report	Yomba 30'	Stadium: Starfire Sports Complex; Attendance: 250; Referee: Jeff Arthurholtz
	Penalties
	Blanchard (penalty missed); Roldan (penalty scored); Haddadi (penalty missed); Wright (penalty scored)		(penalty scored) Casiple; (penalty scored) Richards; (penalty missed) Hoppenot; (penalty scored) Burgos

May 31 Third round	Sacramento Republic FC (California)	2–0	(Nevada) Reno 1868 FC	Sacramento, California
7:30 PM PDT	Williams 41'; Caesar 59'			Stadium: Papa Murphy's Park; Attendance: 2,307

== See also ==
- 2017 San Jose Earthquakes season
