= 2020 Reno 1868 FC season =

Reno 1868 FC
2020 season
- President: Herbert Simon
- Head coach: Ian Russell
- Stadium: Greater Nevada Field
- USL Championship: Western Conference: 1st Group A: 1st
- USL Cup: TBD
- U.S. Open Cup: Cancelled
- Silver State Cup: TBD
- Biggest win: RNO 7–1 POR (Sept. 5)
- Biggest defeat: SAC 1–0 RNO (July 19); RNO 0–1 SAC (August 12)
| Home colors | Away colors |

The 2020 Reno 1868 FC season was the club's fourth season of existence and their fourth in the United Soccer League Championship (USLC), the second tier of American soccer. This article covers the period from November 18, 2019, the day after the 2019 USLC Playoff Final, to the conclusion of the 2020 USLC Playoff Final, scheduled for November 12–16, 2020.

== Roster ==
As of March 6, 2020

| No. | Position | Player | Nation |
|---|---|---|---|
| 4 | DF | USA | Aleks Berkolds |
| 5 | DF | MEX | Tony Alfaro |
| 6 | DF | USA | Thomas Janjigian |
| 7 | MF | USA | Tucker Bone |
| 8 | DF | CUW | Ayrton Statie |
| 9 | MF | HAI | Christiano François |
| 10 | MF | MEX | Sergio Rivas |
| 11 | FW | USA | Foster Langsdorf |
| 13 | FW | USA | Aidan Apodaca |
| 14 | MF | USA | Emilio Ycaza |
| 15 | DF | USA | Yosimar Hernandez |
| 16 | DF | USA | Brent Richards |
| 17 | MF | SEN | Mouhamed Dabo |
| 18 | GK | USA | JT Marcinkowski |
| 19 | MF | SOM | Siad Haji |
| 20 | FW | USA | Benji Kikanovic |
| 21 | FW | USA | Corey Hertzog |
| 22 | MF | MEX | Diego Casillas |
| 23 | MF | ENG | Sam Gleadle |
| 26 | MF | USA | Eric Calvillo |
| 27 | DF | PER | Marcos López |
| 35 | MF | USA | Gilbert Fuentes |
| 38 | MF | USA | Jack Skahan |
| 40 | GK | USA | Eric De La Cerda |
| 89 | MF | USA | Kevin Partida |
| 97 | MF | USA | Jared Timmer |

on loan from MLS affiliate team San Jose Earthquakes.
San Jose Earthquakes Academy player.

== Current staff ==
| Role | Name | Nation |
|---|---|---|
| Head coach | Ian Russell | United States |
| Assistant coach | Chris Malenab | United States |
| Head athletic trainer | Steve Patera | United States |

== Competitions ==
=== Exhibitions ===
| February 8 Preseason 1 | Reno 1868 FC | 3–0 | Oakland Roots SC | Sparks, Nevada |
| TBD PST | Gleadle Kikanovic | Report | | Stadium: Golden Eagle Sports Park |

| February 15 Preseason 2 | Sacramento Republic FC | 1–0 | Reno 1868 FC | Sacramento, California |
| PST | Bijev 104' | Report | | Stadium: Cosumnes River College |
Note: 120-minute match.

| February 18 Preseason 3 | San Jose Earthquakes | 5–1 | Reno 1868 FC | San Jose, California |
| 10:15 AM PST | Eriksson 34'; Ríos; Salinas, Wondolowski (pen.) | Report | Partida | Stadium: Earthquakes Stadium |
Note: Played in four 40-minute periods.

| February 22 Preseason 4 | Reno 1868 FC | 4–1 | Sacramento Gold FC | Sparks, Nevada |
| 12:00 PM PST | Apodaca; Hertzog, François | Report | Goal | Stadium: Golden Eagle Sports Park |

| February 29 Preseason 5 | Reno 1868 FC | 2–4 | San Diego Loyal SC | Reno, Nevada |
| 12:00 PM PST | Hertzog 44', 49' | Report | 7'; 24'; 30'; 75' | Stadium: Greater Nevada Field |

=== USL Championship ===
==== Standings — Group A ====
| Pos | Team | Pld | W | D | L | GF | GA | GD | Pts | PPG | Qualification |
|---|---|---|---|---|---|---|---|---|---|---|---|
| 1 | Reno 1868 FC | 16 | 11 | 3 | 2 | 43 | 21 | +22 | 36 | 2.25 | Advance to USL Championship Playoffs |
| 2 | Sacramento Republic FC | 16 | 8 | 6 | 2 | 27 | 17 | +10 | 30 | 1.88 | Advance to USL Championship Playoffs |
| 3 | Tacoma Defiance | 16 | 4 | 2 | 10 | 25 | 32 | −7 | 14 | 0.88 | |
| 4 | Portland Timbers 2 | 16 | 3 | 0 | 13 | 20 | 50 | −30 | 9 | 0.56 | |

Source: USL

==== Match results ====
On December 20, 2019, the USL announced the 2020 season schedule, creating the following fixture list for the early part of Reno'a season.

| March 6 1 | Tacoma Defiance | 1–3 | Reno 1868 FC | Tacoma, Washington |
| 7:00 PM PST | Hegardt 26'; Daley (yellow card) 38'; Atencio (yellow card) 86' | Report | Skahan 56'; François 74'; Fuentes 87' | Stadium: Cheney Stadium; Attendance: 2,178; Referee: Ismir Pekmic |

In the preparations for the resumption of league play following the shutdown prompted by the COVID-19 pandemic, the remainder of 1868's schedule was announced on July 2.

| July 19 2 | Sacramento Republic FC | 1–0 | Reno 1868 FC | Sacramento, California |
| 6:00 PM PST | McCrary (yellow card) 74'; Iwasa 90+2' (pen.) | Report | Langsdorf (yellow card) 19'; Dabo (yellow card) 88' | Stadium: Papa Murphy's Park; Referee: Nicholas Marin |

| July 29 3 | Portland Timbers 2 | 1–4 | Reno 1868 FC | Portland, Oregon |
| 7:30 PM PDT | Kiner (yellow card) 55'; Ornstil (yellow card) 68' (yellow-red card) 83'; Dúran 73'; Anguiano (yellow card) 81' | Report | François 40', 90' (pen.); Alfaro (yellow card) 44'; Rivas 52'; Richards (yellow card) 59'; Langsdorf 82' | Stadium: Providence Park; Referee: Farhad Dadkho |

| August 1 4 | Las Vegas Lights FC | 0–1 | Reno 1868 FC | Las Vegas, Nevada |
| 7:30 PM PDT | Mendiola (yellow card) 81' | Report | Richards 18' | Stadium: Cashman Field; Referee: Michael Radchuk |

| August 8 5 | Reno 1868 FC | 2–1 | Tacoma Defiance | Reno, Nevada |
| 7:15 PM PDT | Kikanovic 20'; Hertzog 32' (pen.), (yellow card) 32'; Rivas (yellow card) 48'; Ycaza (yellow card) 90'+3' | Report | Robles 24'; Herrera (yellow card) 31'; Cissoko (yellow card) 40' | Stadium: Greater Nevada Field; Referee: Nicholas Marin |

| August 12 6 | Reno 1868 FC | 0–1 | Sacramento Republic FC | Reno, Nevada |
| 7:15 PM PDT | Partida (yellow card) 80'; Dabo (yellow card) 82' | Report | McCrary (yellow card) 21'; Sargis (yellow card) 38'; Bijev 45+2' (pen.), (yellow card) 71'; Keinan (yellow card) 56'; Lopez (yellow card) 75' | Stadium: Greater Nevada Field; Referee: Ismir Pekmic |

| August 15 7 | Reno 1868 FC | 5–2 | Portland Timbers 2 | Reno, Nevada |
| 7:30 PM PDT | Hertzog 25', 45+1'; Rivas 28', (yellow card) 69'; Bone 38'; Langsdorf 64' | Report | Gonzalez 72'; Kiner (yellow card) 73' (yellow-red card) 90+1'; Epps 76'; Ornstil (yellow card) 74' | Stadium: Greater Nevada Field; Referee: Elijio Arreguin |

| August 22 8 | San Diego Loyal SC | 1–3 | Reno 1868 FC | San Diego, California |
| 7:00 PM PDT | Stoneman (yellow card) 37'; Alvarez 66' | Report | Langsdorf 24'; Bone 62'; Apodaca 85' | Stadium: Torero Stadium; Referee: Ricardo Fierro |

| August 29 9 | Reno 1868 FC | 2–1 | Phoenix Rising FC | Reno, Nevada |
| 5:45 PM PDT | Janjigian (yellow card) 41'; Langsdorf 62'; Hertzog 79', (yellow card) 90+6' | Report | Dadashov 76', (yellow card) 90+6'; Calistri (yellow card) 81'; Lambert (yellow card) 87' | Stadium: Greater Nevada Field; Referee: Elijio Arreguin |

| September 5 10 | Reno 1868 FC | 7–1 | Portland Timbers 2 | Reno, Nevada |
| 6:45 PM PDT | Bone 2', 11'; Hertzog 20' (pen.); Langsdorf 35'; François 49'; Richards 65'; Kikanovic 77' | Report | Anguiano (red card) 55'; Clapier 74' | Stadium: Greater Nevada Field; Referee: Ricardo Fierro |

| September 12 11 | Sacramento Republic FC | 3–3 | Reno 1868 FC | Sacramento, California |
| 7:30 PM PST | Werner 5'; Formella 32'; Villarreal 73'; Belmar (yellow card) 80' | Report | Langsdorf 2'; Partida 67', (yellow card) 84'; Alfaro (yellow card) 79'; Apodaca 90+3', (yellow card) 90+4' | Stadium: Papa Murphy's Park; Referee: Chris Ruska |

| September 17 12 | Reno 1868 FC | 3–2 | Tacoma Defiance | Reno, Nevada |
| 6:30 PM PDT | Gleadle 5'; Hertzog (yellow card) 19'; Ycaza 52'; Langsdorf 57' | Report | Kinzner (yellow card) 37'; Serrano (yellow card) 40', (goal) 75'; Kitahara (yellow card) 47'; Cissoko 55'; Hegardt (yellow card) 65'; Gonzalez (yellow card) 90' | Stadium: Greater Nevada Field; Referee: Joseph Salinas |

| September 20 13 | Portland Timbers 2 | 2–5 | Reno 1868 FC | Portland, Oregon |
| 6:00 PM PDT | Ornstil (yellow card) 45+4'; Epps 57'; González Asensi 79' | Report | François 19', 81'; Langsdorf 37'; Gleadle 45'; Apodaca 88' | Stadium: Providence Park; Referee: Brandon Stevis |

| September 26 14 | Reno 1868 FC | 1–1 | Sacramento Republic FC | Reno, Nevada |
| 6:15 PM PDT | Rivas (yellow card) 5'; Richards 44'; Langsdorf (yellow card) 45+1'; Alfaro (yellow card) 50'; Hertzog (yellow card) 58' | Report | Lopez (yellow card) 21'; Keinan 51'; Hilliard-Arce (yellow card) 52'; Villarreal (yellow card) 83'; Formella (yellow card) 90+3' | Stadium: Greater Nevada Field; Referee: Michael Radchuk |

| September 30 15 | Reno 1868 FC | 2–2 | Las Vegas Lights FC | Reno, Nevada |
| 6:15 PM PDT | Alfaro (yellow card) 8'; Langsdorf 12'; Hertzog (penalty missed) 19'; Partida 28' (pen.); Apodaca (yellow card) 81' | Report | Burgos 9'; Chester 25'; Moses (yellow card) 57'; Fehr (yellow card) 70'; Gr. Robinson (yellow card) 74'; Fenwick (yellow card) 90+5' | Stadium: Greater Nevada Field; Referee: Nicholas Marin |

| October 3 16 | Tacoma Defiance | 1–2 | Reno 1868 FC | Tacoma, Washington |
| 7:00 PM PDT | Ocampo-Chavez 16'; Robles (yellow card) 89' | Report | Richards 35'; Langsdorf 62'; Partida (yellow card) 89'; Rivas (yellow card) 90'+1' | Stadium: Cheney Stadium; Referee: Farhad Dadkho |

==== USL Cup Playoffs ====
| October 10 Conf. Quarterfinals | Reno 1868 FC | 4–1 | LA Galaxy II | Reno, Nevada |
| 6:00 PM PDT | Partida 4', (yellow card) 45'; Hertzog 35', 59' (pen.), (yellow card) 77'; Langsdorf 53'; Beaury (yellow card) 85' | Report | Neal 10'; Romero (yellow card) 58'; Hernandez (yellow card) 66'; Vázquez (yellow card) 74'; Saldana (red card) 76' | Stadium: Greater Nevada Field; Attendance: 250; Referee: Matthew Thompson |

| October 17 Conf. Semifinals | Reno 1868 FC | 2–2 (a.e.t.) (4–5 p) | Phoenix Rising FC | Reno, Nevada |
| 6:00 PM PDT | Hertzog 6'; Janjigian (yellow card) 31'; Partida 40'; Bone (yellow card) 57'; Langsdorf (yellow card) 79'; Ycaza (yellow card) 90+4'; Boudadi (yellow card) 119' | Report | King (yellow card) 23'; Lambert 45+2', (yellow card) 51'; Lowe (yellow card) 65'; Asante 71'; Moar (yellow card) 94' | Stadium: Greater Nevada Field; Attendance: 700; Referee: Kevin Broadley |
| | Penalties |
| | Hertzog (penalty scored); Alfaro (penalty scored); Richards (penalty scored); Gleadle (penalty scored); Apodaca (penalty missed) | | (penalty scored) Farrell; (penalty scored) Whelan; (penalty scored) Calistri; (penalty scored) King; (penalty scored) Dadashov |

=== U.S. Open Cup ===
As a USL Championship club, Reno will enter the competition in the Second Round, to be played April 7–9.

| April 8 2nd Round | Olympic Club (California) or FC Davis (California) | Cancelled | (Nevada) Reno 1868 FC | San Francisco, California or Davis, California |
| 7:30 pm PDT | | | | Stadium: Negoesco Stadium or Ron and Mary Brown Stadium at Davis Senior High School |
Note: Match postponed due to the COVID-19 pandemic
