= 2019 Reno 1868 FC season =

Reno 1868 FC
2019 season
- President: Herbert Simon
- Head coach: Ian Russell
- Stadium: Greater Nevada Field
- USL Championship: Western Conference: 2nd
- USL Cup: Conference Quarterfinals
- U.S. Open Cup: Second round
- Silver State Cup: Winner
- Highest home attendance: 5,402 (October 5 vs. El Paso Locomotive)
- Lowest home attendance: 2,919 (March 16 vs. Austin Bold FC)
- Average home league attendance: 4,313
- Biggest win: 5–0 (September 10 vs. Tacoma Defiance)
- Biggest defeat: 0–3 (June 18 vs. Phoenix Rising FC)
Home colors	Away colors

The 2019 Reno 1868 FC season was the club's third season of existence and their third in the United Soccer League Championship, the second tier of American soccer .

== Roster ==
As of February 13, 2019

No.	Position	Player	Nation
3	DF	MEX	Benjamín Galindo (on loan from Guadalajara)
5	DF	USA	Zach Carroll
6	DF	USA	Thomas Janjigian
8	MF	USA	Will Seymore
10	MF	RSA	Lindo Mfeka
11	MF	USA	Duke Lacroix
12	FW	USA	Danny Musovski
16	DF	USA	Brent Richards
17	MF	ENG	Sam Gleadle
21	FW	USA	Corey Hertzog
25	GK	USA	Damion Lewis
40	FW	MEX	Raúl Mendiola
84	MF	USA	Seth Casiple

== Current staff ==
Role	Name	Nation
Head coach	Ian Russell	United States
Assistant coach	Casey Tate	United States
Assistant coach	Chris Malenab	United States
Head athletic trainer	Steve Patera	United States

== Competitions ==
=== Exhibitions ===
All times in Pacific Time

February 9 Preseason	Reno 1868 FC	3–0	San Jose Earthquakes	Reno, Nevada
12:15 PM	Mendiola 4'; Casiple 29'; Musovski 41'	Report		Stadium: Greater Nevada Field; Attendance: 3,143

February 15 Preseason	Real Monarchs	0–4	Reno 1868 FC	Herriman, Utah
		Report	Musovski 4', 27', 51' (pen.), 57'	Stadium: Zions Bank Training Center

February 18 Preseason	Colorado Springs Switchbacks FC	4–1	Reno 1868 FC	Herriman, Utah
	Jome 11', Seth 37'; Malcolm		Richards 58'	Stadium: Zions Bank Training Center

February 23 Preseason	Sacramento Republic FC	4–1	Reno 1868 FC	Davis, California
12:00 PM	Bonomo 16', 79'; Skundrich 30'; Blackwood 42'; (yellow card) 67'	Report	Brown (yellow card) 41', (goal) 78'; Seymore (yellow card) 84'	Stadium: Davis Legacy Soccer Complex

February 23 Preseason	Sacramento Republic FC	1–0	Reno 1868 FC	Davis, California
2:00 PM	Partain 85'	Report	Fuentes (yellow card) 11'	Stadium: Davis Legacy Soccer Complex

=== USL Championship ===
==== Standings ====
Pos	Team	Pld	W	D	L	GF	GA	GD	Pts	Qualification
1	Phoenix Rising FC (X)	34	24	6	4	89	36	+53	78	Conference Quarterfinals
2	Reno 1868 FC	34	18	6	10	72	51	+21	60	Conference Quarterfinals
3	Fresno FC	34	16	9	9	58	44	+14	57	Conference Quarterfinals
4	Real Monarchs (C)	34	16	8	10	71	53	+18	56	Conference Quarterfinals
5	Orange County SC	34	15	9	10	54	43	+11	54	Conference Quarterfinals

Source: USL Championship Standings
Rules for classification: 1) total wins; 2) total goal differential; 3) total goals scored; 4) points earned against top four Conference finishers; 5) disciplinary points; 6) coin toss or drawing of lots
(C) Champions; (X) Regular Season League Champion

==== Results ====
On December 19, 2018, the USL announced their 2019 season schedule.

Win Draw Loss Postponed Upcoming fixture

All times in Pacific Time

March 9 1	Reno 1868 FC	2–2	Orange County SC	Reno, Nevada
1:45 PM	Casiple (yellow card) 40'; Brown 63'; Mfeka 68'; Mendiola (yellow card) 82'	Report	Adams (yellow card) 55'; Forrester (yellow card) 60'; Seaton 77'; Quinn 90+1' (pen.)	Stadium: Greater Nevada Field; Attendance: 3,024; Referee: Jon Freemon

March 16 2	Reno 1868 FC	2–1	Austin Bold FC	Reno, Nevada
4:00 PM	Brown 46', 78'	Report	Kléber 14', (yellow card) 35'; Taylor (yellow card) 45+4'; Saramutin (yellow card) 47'	Stadium: Greater Nevada Field; Attendance: 2,919; Referee: Farhad Dadkho

March 23 3	Fresno FC	1–1	Reno 1868 FC	Fresno, California
7:30 PM	Janjigian 31' (o.g.); Chaney (yellow card) 46'; Moses (yellow card) 52'	Report	Mendiola 42'; Carroll (yellow card) 72'	Stadium: Chukchansi Park; Attendance: 7,863; Referee: Greg Dopka

March 30 4	Reno 1868 FC	3–3	OKC Energy	Reno, Nevada
5:45 PM	Brown 26'; Casiple 51'; Seymore (yellow card) 54'; Gleadle 56'; Carroll (yellow card) 86'; Lacroix (yellow card) 86'	Report	García (yellow card) 62'; Boesetti 72'; Eissele 90+2'; Gordon 90+4'	Stadium: Greater Nevada Field; Attendance: 3,250; Referee: Elijio Arreguin

April 6 5	Real Monarchs	3–1	Reno 1868 FC	Herriman, Utah
1:00 PM	Chang 6'; Plata 15'; Heard (yellow card) 22'; Martínez (yellow card) 36'; Blake 48'	Report	Janjigian (yellow card) 45+2'; Apodaca 81'; Seymore (yellow card) 83'	Stadium: Zions Bank Stadium; Attendance: 2,560; Referee: Fotis Bazakos

April 13 6	Colorado Springs Switchbacks	0–2	Reno 1868 FC	Colorado Springs, Colorado
6:00 PM	Romero (yellow card) 68'	Report	Brown (yellow card) 60', (goal) 90+3'; Casiple 64'	Stadium: Weidner Field; Attendance: 2,702; Referee: Miguel Urbina-Barrios

April 20 7	Reno 1868 FC	2–1	New Mexico United	Reno, Nevada
7:00 PM	Rivas 28', (yellow card) 53'; Lacroix 89'	Report	Suggs 39'; Padilla (yellow card) 48'; Moar (yellow card) 67'	Stadium: Greater Nevada Field; Attendance: 3,656; Referee: Victor Rivas

April 27 8	El Paso Locomotive FC	1–0	Reno 1868 FC	El Paso, Texas
7:30 PM	Contreras 76' (pen.)	Preview	Lacroix (yellow card) 52'; Seymore (yellow card) 69'	Stadium: Southwest University Park; Referee: Marco Vega

May 4 9	Reno 1868 FC	2–2	Tulsa Roughnecks	Reno, Nevada
7:00 PM	Hertzog 29', 45+1'; Seymore (yellow card) 86'	Report	Silva 37'; Gonzalez (yellow card) 55' da Costa 60'	Stadium: Greater Nevada Field; Attendance: 4,760; Referee: Ismir Pekmic

May 11 10	Sacramento Republic FC	1–4	Reno 1868 FC	Sacramento, California
7:30 PM	Taintor 12'; McCrary (yellow card) 19'; Keinan (yellow card) 46'	Report	Hertzog 24', (yellow card) 80', (goal) 88'; Brown 31'; Mfeka (yellow card) 52'; Mendiola 83'; Partida (yellow card) 85'	Stadium: Papa Murphy's Park; Attendance: 10,630; Referee: Farhad Dadkho

May 18 11	Tacoma Defiance	1–1	Reno 1868 FC	Tacoma, Washington
7:00 pm (PDT)	Dhillon 1'; Daley (yellow card) 57'	Report	Brown 84'	Stadium: Cheney Stadium; Attendance: 2,121; Referee: Dejean Susak

June 1 12	Reno 1868 FC	4–0	Las Vegas Lights FC	Reno, Nevada
7:30 PM	Partida (yellow card) 23'; Hertzog 41'; Brown 48'; Mendiola (yellow card) 64', (goal) 79'; Lacroix 86'	Report	Cruz (yellow card) 58'; Tabortetaka (yellow card) 76'; Hernández (yellow card) 90'	Stadium: Greater Nevada Field; Attendance: 4,801; Referee: Rosendo Mendoza

June 8 13	San Antonio FC	3–2	Reno 1868 FC	San Antonio, Texas
7:30 p.m. CDT	Ackon (yellow card) 12'; Guzmán 44'; Bryant 61'; Gallegos 62'	Report	Hertzog 9'; Cowell 17'; Seymore (yellow card) 90+1'	Stadium: Toyota Field; Attendance: 7,467; Referee: Sergii Demianchuk

June 15 14	Reno 1868 FC	4–2	LA Galaxy II	Reno, Nevada
7:30 PM	Hertzog 7'; Musovski 13'; Gleadle 60'; Apodaca 65'	Report	López 3' (pen.); Williams 30'; Ontiveros (yellow card) 50' (yellow-red card) 80'	Stadium: Greater Nevada Field; Attendance: 5,112; Referee: Calin Radosav

June 18 15	Reno 1868 FC	0–3	Phoenix Rising FC	Reno, Nevada
7:30 PM	Mendiola (yellow card) 24'; Galindo (yellow card) 59'	Report	Jahn 7'; Musa (yellow card) 22'; Asante 56'; Calistri (yellow card) 66', (goal) 90+5'; Fernandez (yellow card) 90'	Stadium: Greater Nevada Field; Attendance: 4,262; Referee: Malik Badawi

June 26 16	Portland Timbers 2	1–2	Reno 1868 FC	Portland, Oregon
9:00 PM	Hurtado 14'; Miller (yellow card) 50'	Report	Seymore (yellow card) 49'; Carroll (yellow card) 50'; Musovski 60', (yellow card) 67'; Casiple 62'; Rivas (yellow card) 87'	Stadium: Providence Park; Attendance: 1,922; Referee: Dejan Susak

June 29 17	Reno 1868 FC	2–0	Sacramento Republic FC	Reno, Nevada
7:30 PM	Mendiola 35'; Rivas 60'	Report	Saari (yellow card) 44'	Stadium: Greater Nevada Field; Attendance: 4,498; Referee: Jon Freemon

July 3 18	Reno 1868 FC	4–0	Rio Grande Valley FC Toros	Reno, Nevada
7:30 PM	Gleadle 23', 45'; Akanyirige (yellow card) 32'; Hertzog 48'; Carroll 51'; Partida (yellow card) 83'	Report	Monroy (yellow card) 65'; Rodriguez (yellow card) 90'	Stadium: Greater Nevada Field; Attendance: 4,414; Referee: Mark Allatin

July 17 19	OKC Energy	2–3	Reno 1868 FC	Oklahoma City, Oklahoma
6:00 PM	J. Brown 2'; Gordon 23'; R. Garcia (yellow card) 54'; Watson (yellow card) 79'	Report	Mfeka 66'; Apodaca 71'; Hertzog 77', (yellow card) 78'	Stadium: Taft Stadium; Attendance: 5,586; Referee: Lukasz Szpala

July 20 20	LA Galaxy II	1–2	Reno 1868 FC	Carson, California
19:00	Gallagher (yellow card) 2'; Koreniuk 75'; DePuy (yellow card) 90'; Vera (yellow card) 90+3'	Report	Gallagher 9' (o.g.); Carroll (yellow card) 17'; Gleadle (yellow card) 53'; Casiple 70'; Mendiola (yellow card) 90'	Stadium: Dignity Health Sports Park; Attendance: 535; Referee: Michael Radchuk

July 24 21	Orange County SC	4–1	Reno 1868 FC	Irvine, California
1:00 PM	Seaton 11'; Jones 36', 50'; Alvarado (yellow card) 60'; Crisostomo 90+3'	Report	Hertzog 58' (pen.)	Stadium: Championship Soccer Stadium; Referee: Rosendo Mendoza

July 27 22	Reno 1868 FC	4–0	Colorado Springs Switchbacks	Reno, Nevada
7:30 PM	Hertzog 18'; Lacroix 27'; Mfeka 51', 69'; Partida (yellow card) 80'; Richards (yellow card) 90+3'	Report	Schweitzer (yellow card) 76'; Bone (yellow card) 80'; Hundley (yellow card) 90+3'	Stadium: Greater Nevada Field; Attendance: 4,209; Referee: Chris Ruska

August 3 23	Rio Grande Valley FC Toros	1–2	Reno 1868 FC	Edinburg, Texas
5:30 PM	Arcila 10'; Bird (yellow card) 73'	Report	Janjigian 9'; Apodaca 20'; Akanyirige (yellow card) 30'; Seymore (yellow card) 90+2'	Stadium: H-E-B Park; Attendance: 3,804; Referee: Gabriele Giusti

August 10 24	Reno 1868 FC	1–4	San Antonio FC	Reno, Nevada
7:30 PM	Cavillo (yellow card) 14' (yellow-red card) 50'; Fuentes (yellow card) 45+5'; Partida (yellow card) 59'; Gleadle 71'	Report	Parano 12', 44'; Jamieson (yellow card) 23'; López 56'; Barmby 57'; Hernández (yellow card) 82'	Stadium: Greater Nevada Field; Attendance: 4,670; Referee: Farhad Dadkho

August 16 25	Phoenix Rising FC	4–2	Reno 1868 FC	Scottsdale, Arizona
7:30pm	Flemmings 20'; Asante 59' (pen.), 79' (pen.); Dumbuya 61'	Report	Musovski 53'; Hertzog 74'	Stadium: Casino Arizona Field; Attendance: 7,046; Referee: Mark Allatin

August 31 26	Reno 1868 FC	1–3	Portland Timbers 2	Reno, Nevada
7:00 PM	Hertzog 82'; Galindo (yellow card) 90+3'; Hertzog (yellow card) 90+4'	Report	Ornstil (yellow card) 8'; Sierakowski 26'; Anguiano 42'; Ojeda 51'; Kiner (yellow card) 90'	Stadium: Greater Nevada Field; Attendance: 4,763; Referee: Ismir Pekmic

September 7 27	Reno 1868 FC	2–3	Fresno FC	Reno, Nevada
7:00 PM	Lacroix (yellow card) 68'; Musovski 89', 90+2'; Carroll (yellow card) 90+3'; Seymore (yellow card) 90+3'	Report	Chavez 23'; Martin (yellow card) 29'; Caffa 35' (pen.); Cooper (yellow card) 45'; Ellis-Hayden (yellow card) 60'; Alihodžić 90+4', (yellow card) 90+5'	Stadium: Greater Nevada Field; Attendance: 4,962; Referee: Elijio Arreguin

September 10 28	Reno 1868 FC	5–0	Tacoma Defiance	Reno, Nevada
7:00 pm (PDT)	Musovski 4', 26', 30', 41'; Casiple 27'; Seymore (yellow card) 74'	Report	Dhillon (penalty missed) 47'	Stadium: Greater Nevada Field; Attendance: 3,616; Referee: Victor Rivas

September 15 29	Austin Bold FC	1–2	Reno 1868 FC	Austin, Texas
6:00 PM	de Villardi (yellow card) 38'; Kléber 41'; Phillips (yellow card) 79'	Report	Hertzog 20' (pen.); Musovski 43'; Galindo (yellow card) 52'; Mfeka (yellow card) 89'	Stadium: Austin Bold Stadium; Attendance: 1,645; Referee: Guido Gonzales, Jr.

September 20 30	New Mexico United	1–3	Reno 1868 FC	Albuquerque, New Mexico
7:30 PM	Moar 7', (yellow card) 83'; Wehan (yellow card) 27'	Report	Hertzog 45', 55'; Richards 54'; Galindo (yellow card) 67'; Partida (yellow card) 75' (yellow-red card) 80'; Lacroix (yellow card) 88'	Stadium: Isotopes Park; Attendance: 10,518; Referee: Matthew Franz

September 28 31	Reno 1868 FC	1–2	Real Monarchs	Reno, Nevada
7:00 pm (PDT)	Musovski 29'	Report	Powder 41'; Portillo (yellow card) 42'; Ryden (yellow card) 81'; Holt 83'	Stadium: Greater Nevada Field; Attendance: 5,007; Referee: Matthew Thompson

October 5 32	Reno 1868 FC	0–0	El Paso Locomotive FC	Reno, Nevada
7:00 pm (PDT)	Galindo (yellow card) 15'; Janjigian (yellow card) 89'	Report	Monsalvez (yellow card) 10'; Bosetti (yellow card) 54'; Diaz (yellow card) 84'	Stadium: Greater Nevada Field; Attendance: 5,402; Referee: Malik Badawi

October 12 33	Las Vegas Lights FC	0–2	Reno 1868 FC	Las Vegas, Nevada
7:30 PM	Villareal (yellow card) 90'	Report	Torre 35' (o.g.); Haji 76'	Stadium: Cashman Field; Attendance: 10,117; Referee: Michael Radchuk

October 19 34	Tulsa Roughnecks	0–3	Reno 1868 FC	Tulsa, Oklahoma
1:00 PM	Boakye-Mensa (yellow card) 35'; Uzo (yellow card) 49'; Gonzalez (yellow card) 77'; Mompremier (yellow card) 85'	Report	Hertzog 15' (pen.), 83'; Apodaca 22'	Stadium: Oneok Field; Attendance: 1,390; Referee: Gabriele Giusti

==== USL Cup Playoffs ====
October 26 Conference Quarterfinals	Reno 1868 FC	1–3	Sacramento Republic FC	Reno, Nevada
7:30 PM	Hertzog 5'	Report	Werner 8'; Iwasa 70'; Taintor (yellow card) 73'; Enevoldsen 75'; Skundrich (yellow card) 84'	Stadium: Greater Nevada Field; Attendance: 3,275; Referee: Malik Badawi

=== U.S. Open Cup ===
As a member of the USL Championship, Reno 1868 FC will enter the tournament in the Second Round, to be played May 14–15, 2019, with the pairing announced on April 17.

May 15 Second Round	Sacramento Republic FC (California)	1–0	(Nevada) Reno 1868 FC	Sacramento, California
7:30 PM	Taintor (yellow card) 29'; Werner (yellow card) 51', (goal) 82'; Villarreal (yellow card) 74'; Bonomo (yellow card) 90+2'	Report	Aune (yellow card) 86'	Stadium: Papa Murphy's Park; Referee: Turan Özdemir
