= Matt Bersano =

American soccer player (born 1992)

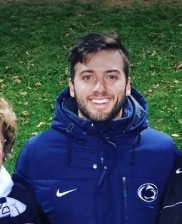

Personal information
- Full name: Matthew K. Bersano
- Date of birth: September 10, 1992 (age 34)
- Place of birth: Chandler, Arizona, United States
- Height: 1.85 m (6 ft 1 in)
- Position: Goalkeeper

Youth career
- 2010–2011: Real Salt Lake AZ

College career
Years	Team	Apps	(Gls)
2011–2014	Oregon State Beavers	54	(0)
2015	Penn State Nittany Lions	13	(0)

Senior career*
Years	Team	Apps	(Gls)
2014–2015	Lane United	16	(0)
2016	Seattle Sounders FC 2	2	(0)
2017–2022	San Jose Earthquakes	2	(0)
2017–2019	→ Reno 1868 (loan)	53	(0)
2022	San Jose Earthquakes II	2	(0)
2023–2024	Austin FC	0	(0)
- * Club domestic league appearances and goals as of April 3, 2024

Matt Bersano (born September 10, 1992) is an American professional soccer player who plays as a goalkeeper.

== Career ==
=== Youth, college and amateur ===
After spending his youth career with the Real Salt Lake AZ academy, Bersano began his college career at Oregon State University. He made a total of 54 appearances and recorded 14 clean sheets for the Beavers before transferring to Penn State University in 2015. In his lone season with the Nittany Lions, Bersano made 13 appearances and finished with a 1.19 Goals Against Average and five clean sheets.

He also played in the Premier Development League for Lane United FC.

== Professional ==
=== Seattle Sounders 2 ===
On March 24, 2016, Bersano signed a professional contract with USL club Seattle Sounders FC 2. He ended up making his professional debut on September 11, coming on as a sub in the 81st minute for the injured Charlie Lyon in S2's away match at Oklahoma City Energy. The match ended in a 2–2 draw.

=== San Jose Earthquakes ===
Bersano signed with Major League Soccer side San Jose Earthquakes on March 13, 2017. He was subsequently loaned out to San Jose's USL affiliate Reno 1868 FC, where he was named the team's Goalkeeper of the Year at the end of the season. He was recalled to San Jose for the 2018 season, having won the backup position to Andrew Tarbell after Tarbell replaced David Bingham as the starting keeper and Bingham was traded to the LA Galaxy.

=== Austin FC ===
On January 3, 2023, Bersano signed with MLS side Austin FC.

== Career statistics ==
As of matches played October 19, 2024

Club	Season	League			Playoffs		National cup		Other		Total	
Club	Season	Division	Apps	Goals	Apps	Goals	Apps	Goals	Apps	Goals	Apps	Goals
Seattle Sounders FC 2	2016	USL	2	0	—		—		—		2	0
Seattle Sounders FC 2	Total		2	0	—		—		—		2	0
Reno (loan)	2017	USL	27	0	1	0	0	0	—		28	0
Reno (loan)	2018	USL	9	0	2	0	0	0	—		11	0
Reno (loan)	2019	USL Championship	18	0	1	0	0	0	—		19	0
Reno (loan)	Total		54	0	4	0	0	0	—		58	0
San Jose Earthquakes	2017	Major League Soccer	0	0	0	0	0	0	—		0	0
San Jose Earthquakes	2018	Major League Soccer	0	0	—		0	0	—		0	0
San Jose Earthquakes	2019	Major League Soccer	0	0	—		—		—		0	0
San Jose Earthquakes	2020	Major League Soccer	0	0	0	0	—		0	0	0	0
San Jose Earthquakes	2021	Major League Soccer	0	0	—		—		—		0	0
San Jose Earthquakes	2022	Major League Soccer	2	0	—		3	0	—		2	0
San Jose Earthquakes	Total		2	0	0	0	3	0	0	0	5	0
San Jose Earthquakes II (loan)	2022	MLS Next Pro	2	0	—		—		—		2	0
Austin FC	2023	Major League Soccer	0	0	—		0	0	0	0	0	0
Austin FC	2024	Major League Soccer	0	0	—		—		0	0	0	0
Austin FC	Total		0	0	0	0	0	0	0	0	0	0
Career total			64	0	0	0	3	0	0	0	65	0
