= Gilbert Fuentes =

American soccer player

Personal information
- Full name: Gilbert Fuentes
- Date of birth: February 21, 2002 (age 24)
- Place of birth: Tracy, California, United States
- Height: 1.68 m (5 ft 6 in)
- Position: Attacking midfielder

Youth career
- 2016–2017: San Jose Earthquakes

Senior career*
Years	Team	Apps	(Gls)
2018–2022	San Jose Earthquakes	3	(0)
2018–2020	→ Reno 1868 (loan)	16	(1)
2021	→ Austin Bold (loan)	5	(1)

International career^{‡}
2016–2017	United States U15	8	(1)
2017–2019	United States U17	22	(1)
- * Club domestic league appearances and goals as of November 7, 2021 ‡ National team caps and goals as of January 26, 2018

Gilbert Fuentes (born February 21, 2002) is an American professional soccer player who plays as an attacking midfielder.

== Club career ==
=== Youth ===
Fuentes was born in Tracy, California. He began playing for the San Jose Earthquakes academy side in 2016, first with his regular age group in the U15s. During the 2017-18 academy season, he moved up to the U19 squad and scored three goals in eight appearances. Previously, he played for Ballistic United SC.

In November 2017, TopDrawerSoccer.com listed Fuentes as the fourth best player and top midfielder in the nation for the class of 2020. He was only one of five players in the country to be given a five-star ranking by the website.

=== San Jose Earthquakes ===
San Jose signed Fuentes to a Homegrown contract on January 26, 2018. He was the team's third Homegrown signing of 2018, following the signings of teammates JT Marcinkowski and Jacob Akanyirige, and at the time of his signing was the club's youngest ever player and the youngest ever athlete for a Bay Area sports team.

Borussia Dortmund had competed with San Jose for Fuentes' signature before he signed his Homegrown contract, due in part to the fact that he works with the same agent as Christian Pulisic.

On May 3, 2021, Fuentes joined USL Championship side Austin Bold on a season-long loan.

== International career ==
Fuentes made eight appearances for various United States Soccer Federation youth teams in 2017. He was a starter for the U15 squad at the 2017 CONCACAF Boys' Under-15 Championship, including in the United States' loss to Mexico in the tournament final, and was called up to the United States U17 in November for the Men's Nike International Friendlies, and again in January 2018 for the first-ever USYNT Summit Camp.

Also eligible for both Guatemala and El Salvador, it was announced on January 23, 2021, that Fuentes would switch to El Salvador U23 ahead of the CONCACAF Olympic Qualifying Championship, but was left out of the 20-man squad.

== Personal ==
Fuentes is of both Guatemalan and Salvadoran descent which allows him to play for both Guatemala and El Salvador national teams as well as the United States national team having been born in the U.S. His father is from Guatemala and his mother from El Salvador.

== Career statistics ==
As of November 7, 2021

Club	Season	League			National cup		Continental		Other		Totals	
Club	Season	League	Apps	Goals	Apps	Goals	Apps	Goals	Apps	Goals	Apps	Goals
San Jose Earthquakes	2018	MLS	1	0	—		—		—		1	0
San Jose Earthquakes	2019	MLS	1	0	—		—		—		1	0
San Jose Earthquakes	2020	MLS	1	0	—		—		—		1	0
San Jose Earthquakes	Total		3	0	—		—		—		3	0
Reno 1868 (loan)	2018	USL	4	0	—		—		—		4	0
Reno 1868 (loan)	2019	USL	11	0	—		—		—		11	0
Reno 1868 (loan)	2020	USL	1	1	—		—		—		1	1
Reno 1868 (loan)	Total		16	1	—		—		—		16	1
Austin Bold (loan)	2021	USL	5	1	—		—		—		5	1
Career totals			24	2	0	0	0	0	0	0	24	2
