= JT Marcinkowski =

American soccer player (born 1997)

Personal information
- Full name: James Thomas Marcinkowski
- Date of birth: May 9, 1997 (age 29)
- Place of birth: Alamo, California, U.S.
- Height: 6 ft 1 in (1.85 m)
- Position: Goalkeeper

Team information
- Current team: LA Galaxy
- Number: 12

Youth career
- 2011–2015: San Jose Earthquakes

College career
Years	Team	Apps	(Gls)
2015–2017	Georgetown	56	(0)

Senior career*
Years	Team	Apps	(Gls)
2016	Burlingame Dragons	2	(0)
2018–2024	San Jose Earthquakes	95	(0)
2018–2020	→ Reno 1868 (loan)	41	(0)
2025–	LA Galaxy	0	(0)
2025–	→ Ventura County FC (loan)	4	(0)

International career^{‡}
2013–2014	United States U18	7	(0)
2016–2017	United States U20	7	(0)
2019–2021	United States U23	5	(0)
Medal record
Representing United States
Winner	CONCACAF U-20 Championship	2017
- * Club domestic league appearances and goals as of July 16, 2025 ‡ National team caps and goals as of June 4, 2017

James Thomas "JT" Marcinkowski (born May 9, 1997) is an American professional soccer player who plays as a goalkeeper for Major League Soccer club LA Galaxy.

== Career ==
=== College and amateur ===
Marcinkowski played for the Georgetown Hoyas for three seasons from 2015 to 2017, where he achieved a 0.84 goals-against average (GAA) over 56 appearances. In his final season at Georgetown, he captained the team to a 2017 Big East Conference Men's Soccer Tournament championship, his second with the team. He also played two games for the USL PDL side Burlingame Dragons.

=== Professional ===
Marcinkowski signed a Homegrown Player contract with the MLS side San Jose Earthquakes on December 6, 2017, after spending four years prior to his college career with the team's academy. He was San Jose's third-ever homegrown signing to the first team, after Tommy Thompson and Nick Lima. Marcinkowski was temporarily loaned to San Jose's USL affiliate Reno 1868 FC, and played his first game for the team in Reno's 3–4 loss to Swope Park Rangers on March 17, 2018.

On January 16, 2025, Marcinkowski signed a two-year deal with LA Galaxy as a free agent.

=== International ===
Born in the United States, Marcinkowski is of Polish descent. He has played for the United States' men's national team at multiple levels, earning 24 caps between the U14 and U18 levels. In 2017, he played for the U20 squad, at the 2017 CONCACAF U-20 Championship and the 2017 FIFA U-20 World Cup. Marcinkowski was named to the final 20-player United States under-23 roster for the 2020 CONCACAF Men's Olympic Qualifying Championship in March 2021.

== Career statistics ==
=== Club ===
As of May 20, 2023

Appearances and goals by club, season and competition
Club	Season	League			National cup		Continental		Other		Total	
Club	Season	Division	Apps	Goals	Apps	Goals	Apps	Goals	Apps	Goals	Apps	Goals
Burlingame Dragons	2016	PDL	2	0	—		—		—		2	0
San Jose Earthquakes	2018	MLS	5	0	—		—		—		5	0
San Jose Earthquakes	2019	MLS	0	0	—		—		—		0	0
San Jose Earthquakes	2020	MLS	11	0	—		—		1 (Note: Appearance in MLS Cup Playoffs)	0	12	0
San Jose Earthquakes	2021	MLS	33	0	—		—		—		33	0
San Jose Earthquakes	2022	MLS	33	0	—		—		—		33	0
San Jose Earthquakes	2023	MLS	11	0	—		—		—		11	0
San Jose Earthquakes	Total		93	0	0	0	0	0	1	0	94	0
Reno 1868 (loan)	2018	USL	24	0	—		—		—		24	0
Reno 1868 (loan)	2019	USL	16	0	1	0	—		—		17	0
Reno 1868 (loan)	2020	USL	1	0	—		—		—		1	0
Reno 1868 (loan)	Total		41	0	1	0	—		—		42	0
Career total			136	0	1	0	0	0	1	0	138	0

== Honors ==
United States U20

- CONCACAF Under-20 Championship: 2017
