= Sergio Rivas =

Mexican footballer (born 1997)

Personal information
- Date of birth: 3 October 1997 (age 29)
- Place of birth: Parral, Chihuahua, Mexico
- Height: 1.80 m (5 ft 11 in)
- Position: Attacking midfielder

College career
Years	Team	Apps	(Gls)
2015–2018	Seattle Redhawks	85	(21)

Senior career*
Years	Team	Apps	(Gls)
2016	Albuquerque Sol	5	(1)
2017	Seattle Sounders FC U-23	5	(2)
2018	Albuquerque Sol	4	(1)
2019–2020	Reno 1868	30	(4)
2021–2025	New Mexico United	128	(17)
2026	Sacramento Republic FC	0	(0)
- * Club domestic league appearances and goals as of May 25, 2026

Sergio Rivas (born 3 October 1997) is a Mexican professional footballer who last played as an attacking midfielder for USL Championship club Sacramento Republic FC.

== Early life ==
Rivas was born in Parral, Chihuahua, Mexico, and moved to Albuquerque, New Mexico, at the age of seven.

== Career ==
=== College ===
Rivas spent his entire college career at Seattle University. He was named the Western Athletic Conference (WAC) Freshman of the Year. Rivas made a total of 85 appearances for the Redhawks and tallied 21 goals and 27 assists.

While at college, Rivas played for Premier Development League sides Albuquerque Sol and Seattle Sounders FC U-23.

=== Professional ===
On January 11, 2019, Rivas was selected 26th overall in the 2019 MLS SuperDraft by San Jose Earthquakes. On March 20, 2019, Rivas signed with San Jose's USL Championship affiliate side Reno 1868 FC. Reno folded their team on November 6, 2020, due to the financial impact of the COVID-19 pandemic.

On December 24, 2020, Rivas signed with USL Championship side New Mexico United ahead of their 2021 season. Rivas reached the career milestone of 10,000 minutes played in the USL Championship during the September 13, 2026 match vs FC Tulsa.

On March 30, 2026, USL Championship side Sacramento Republic FC announced they had signed Rivas to a 25-day contract.

== Career statistics ==
As of As of match played 11 Aug 2024

Club	Season	League			Domestic Cup		League Cup		Total	
Club	Season	Division	Apps	Goals	Apps	Goals	Apps	Goals	Apps	Goals
Albuquerque Sol	2016	USL PDL	5	1	—		—		5	1
Seattle Sounders FC U-23	2017	USL PDL	5	2	1 (Note: Appearances in U.S. Open Cup)	0	—		6	2
Albuquerque Sol	2018	USL PDL	4	1	—		—		4	1
Reno 1868	2019	USL Championship	16	2	1	0	—		17	2
Reno 1868	2020	USL Championship	14	2	—		2 (Note: Appearances in USL Championship playoffs)	0	16	2
Reno 1868	Total		30	4	1	0	2	0	33	4
New Mexico United	2021	USL Championship	29	5	—		—		29	5
New Mexico United	2022	USL Championship	24	2	1	0	0	0	15	2
New Mexico United	2023	USL Championship	32	7	3	0	—		35	7
New Mexico United	2024	USL Championship	13	3	3	0			16	3
New Mexico United	Total		98	17	7	0	0	0	105	17
Career total			142	26	9	0	2	0	153	26
