= Marcos López =

Peruvian footballer (born 1999)

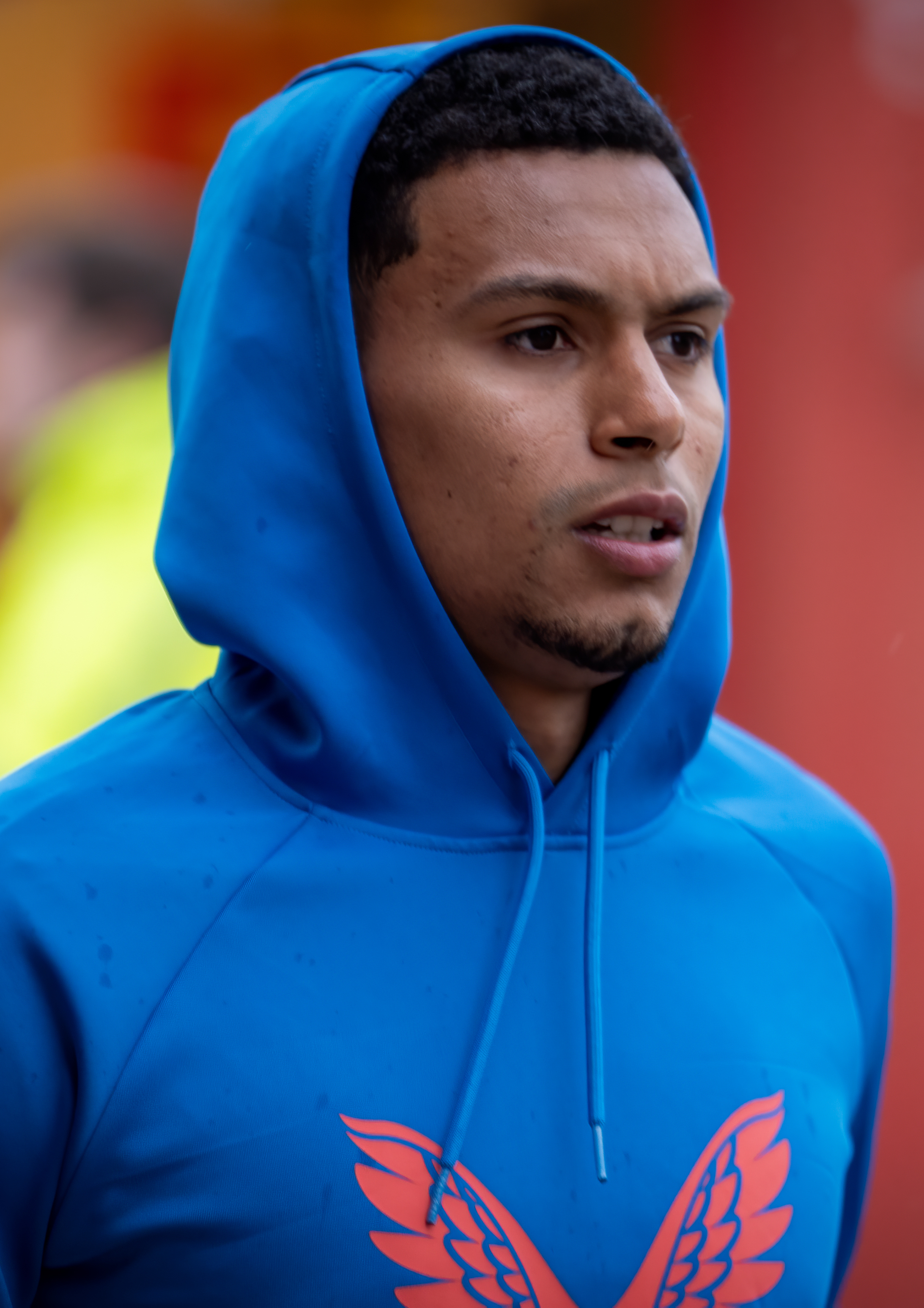
- López with Feyenoord in 2024

Personal information
- Full name: Marcos Johan López Lanfranco
- Date of birth: 20 November 1999 (age 26)
- Place of birth: La Esperanza, Peru
- Height: 1.76 m (5 ft 9 in)
- Position: Left-back

Team information
- Current team: Copenhagen
- Number: 15

Youth career
- –2016: USMP

Senior career*
Years	Team	Apps	(Gls)
2016–2017	USMP	2	(0)
2017–2018	Sporting Cristal	23	(5)
2019–2022	San Jose Earthquakes	69	(4)
2020	→ Reno 1868 (loan)	1	(0)
2022–2025	Feyenoord	32	(0)
2024–2025	→ Copenhagen (loan)	17	(0)
2025–	Copenhagen	39	(2)

International career^{‡}
2017–2019	Peru U20	8	(0)
2020	Peru U23	4	(0)
2018–	Peru	58	(0)
- * Club domestic league appearances and goals as of 26 October 2026 ‡ National team caps and goals as of 23:23, 14 November 2026 (UTC)

Marcos Johan López Lanfranco (born 20 November 1999) is a Peruvian professional footballer who plays as a left-back for Danish Superliga club Copenhagen, and the Peru national team.

== Club career ==
=== San Martín ===
López started his professional career with San Martín in 2016.

=== Sporting Cristal ===
On 4 September 2017, he signed with Primera División club Sporting Cristal.

=== San Jose Earthquakes ===
In January 2019, López signed with San Jose Earthquakes.

==== 2020: Loan to Reno 1868 ====
On 22 April 2020, López joined Reno 1868 on loan.

=== Feyenoord ===
On 8 August 2022, Feyenoord announced that it had signed López on a four-year contract. He made his debut for the club on 11 August 2022 in a 3–0 win over Sparta Rotterdam.

==== 2024–25: Loan to Copenhagen ====
On August 22, 2024 Danish Superliga club F.C. Copenhagen confirmed that they had hired López with an option to buy included, until June 2025.

=== Copenhagen ===
In June 2025, López joined Copenhagen on a permanent deal.

== International career ==
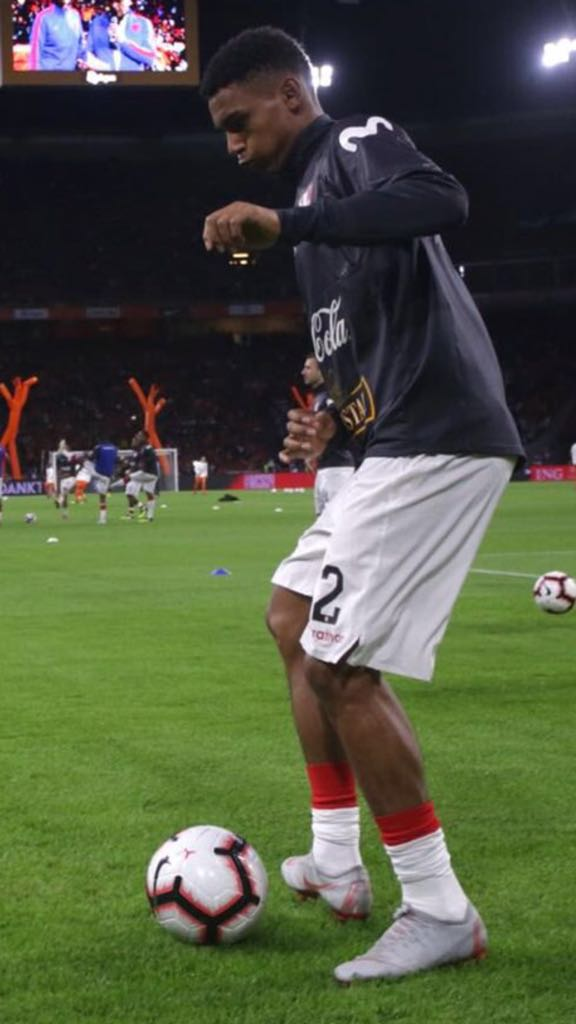
López training with Peru in 2018

On 17 August 2018, he was called up by Ricardo Gareca to the full Peru international squad for friendly matches against Germany and Holland. He made his Peru debut entering the field as a substitute for Edison Flores in the 67th minute against Germany on 9 September 2018 at the Rhein-Neckar-Arena.

== Career statistics ==
=== Club ===
As of match played 29 October 2026

Appearances by club, season and competition
Club	Season	League			Cup		Continental		Other		Total	
Club	Season	Division	Apps	Goals	Apps	Goals	Apps	Goals	Apps	Goals	Apps	Goals
USMP	2016	Peruvian Primera División	2	0	0	0	0	0	—		2	0
Sporting Cristal	2018	Peruvian Primera División	23	5	0	0	0	0	—		23	5
San Jose Earthquakes	2019	Major League Soccer	18	0	2	0	0	0	—		20	0
San Jose Earthquakes	2020	Major League Soccer	14	2	0	0	0	0	—		14	2
San Jose Earthquakes	2021	Major League Soccer	21	1	0	0	0	0	—		21	1
San Jose Earthquakes	2022	Major League Soccer	17	1	2	0	0	0	—		19	1
San Jose Earthquakes	Total		70	4	4	0	0	0	—		74	4
Reno 1868 (loan)	2020	USL Championship	1	0	0	0	0	0	—		1	0
Feyenoord	2022–23	Eredivisie	19	0	1	0	8 (Note: Appearances in UEFA Europa League)	0	—		28	0
Feyenoord	2023–24	Eredivisie	12	0	1	0	1 (Note: Appearances in UEFA Champions League)	0	1 (Note: Appearance in Johan Cruijff Shield)	0	15	0
Feyenoord	2024–25	Eredivisie	1	0	0	0	0	0	1	0	2	0
Feyenoord	Total		32	0	2	0	9	0	2	0	45	0
Copenhagen (loan)	2024–25	Danish Superliga	17	0	6	0	7 (Note: Appearances in UEFA Conference League)	0	0	0	29	0
Copenhagen	2025–26	Danish Superliga	29	1	6	0	13 (Note: Appearances in UEFA Champions League)	0	0	0	48	1
Copenhagen	2026–27	Danish Superliga	10	1	1	0	6	0	0	0	17	1
Copenhagen	Total		39	2	7	0	19	0	0	0	65	2
Career total			185	11	19	0	35	0	2	0	239	11

=== International ===
As of match played 14 November 2026

Appearances and goals by national team and year
National team	Year	Apps	Goals
Peru	2018	1	0
Peru	2019	1	0
Peru	2020	2	0
Peru	2021	13	0
Peru	2022	7	0
Peru	2023	8	0
Peru	2024	9	0
Peru	2025	8	0
Peru	2026	9	0
Total		58	0

== Honours ==
Sporting Cristal

- Peruvian Primera División: 2018

Feyenoord

- Eredivisie: 2022–23
- KNVB Cup: 2023–24
- Johan Cruyff Shield: 2024

Copenhagen

- Danish Superliga: 2024–25
- Danish Cup: 2024–25
