= Zach Carroll =

American soccer player (born 1994)

Personal information
- Full name: Zachary Carroll
- Date of birth: March 16, 1994 (age 32)
- Place of birth: Grand Blanc, Michigan, United States
- Height: 6 ft 3 in (1.91 m)
- Position: Defender

College career
Years	Team	Apps	(Gls)
2012–2013	Virginia Cavaliers	24	(4)
2014–2015	Michigan State Spartans	40	(7)

Senior career*
Years	Team	Apps	(Gls)
2013	RVA FC	3	(3)
2014	Michigan Bucks	10	(1)
2016	New York Red Bulls	0	(0)
2016	→ New York Red Bulls II (loan)	5	(0)
2016	New York Red Bulls II	20	(0)
2017	Orlando City B	24	(2)
2018–2019	Reno 1868	50	(3)
2020–2022	Memphis 901	62	(4)
2023	Las Vegas Lights	30	(0)
- * Club domestic league appearances and goals as of March 25, 2024

Zach Carroll (born March 16, 1994) is an American soccer player who plays as a defender.

== Career ==
=== Early career ===
Carroll attended Grand Blanc High School where he was a member of the varsity soccer team, as well as the placekicker for the football team. In 2011, Carroll was a member of the United States U-17 National Team, starting at center back for both the U-17 World Cup in Mexico, as well as the CONCACAF Tournament in Jamaica, where he won Gold. In 2011, Carroll was named NSCAA National Boys High School Player of the Year, an NSCAA All-American, Michigan's Mr. Soccer, and Michigan's Gatorade Player of the Year. At the collegiate level, Carroll played soccer with the University of Virginia for his freshman and sophomore season before transferring to Michigan State University for his junior and senior seasons.

=== Professional ===
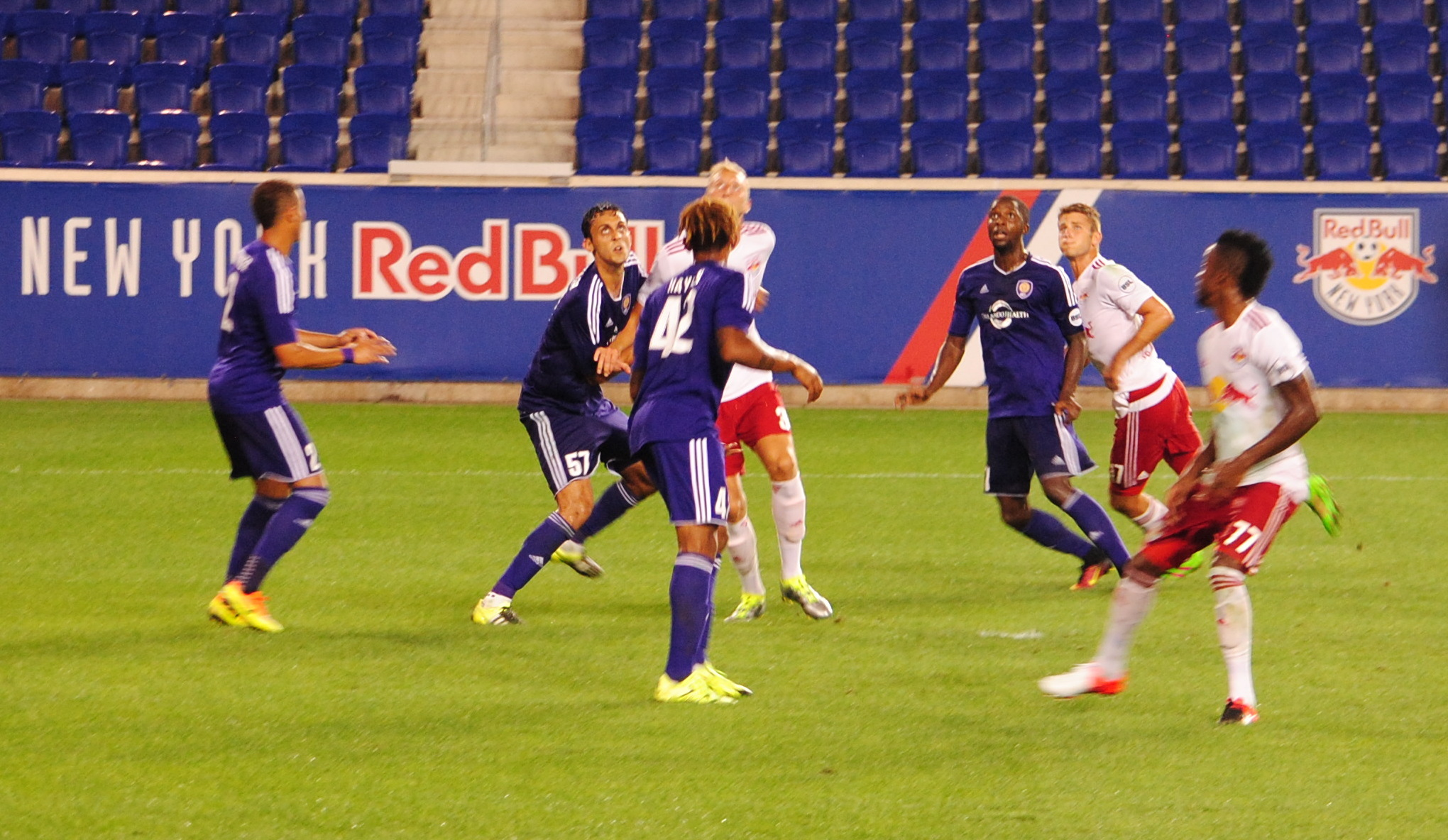
Carroll playing for New York Red Bulls II in 2016

On January 14, 2016, Carroll was selected by the New York Red Bulls in the 2016 MLS SuperDraft as the 38th pick. After a successful preseason, Carroll signed his first professional contract days before the 2016 season on March 3. Carroll made his first MLS bench appearance on March 12 as an unused sub in a 3–0 defeat to the Montreal Impact.

On March 26, the New York Red Bulls announced that they had loaned Carroll and six other first team players to New York Red Bulls II for their home opener. He went on to make his professional debut for New York Red Bulls II on March 26, appearing as a starter in a 2–2 draw against Toronto FC II.

Carroll was waived by the club on May 5, following the signing of defender, Aurélien Collin. On May 20, he rejoined the organization signing with New York Red Bulls II. On October 18, 2016, Carroll was named to the 2016 USL All-League Second Team, as he helped the club to the USL regular season title. On October 23, 2016, Carroll helped the club to a 5–1 victory over Swope Park Rangers in the 2016 USL Cup Final.

Carroll was released by Red Bulls II in November 2016.

On December 1, 2016, Carroll was signed by Orlando City B of USL for the 2017 season.

Carroll signed with Reno 1868 FC for the 2018 season on December 19, 2017.

Carroll was announced as a new signing for USL Championship side Las Vegas Lights on January 25, 2023.

== Career statistics ==
As of May 1, 2016

Club	Season	League		MLS Cup/Playoffs		US Open Cup		CONCACAF		Total	
Club	Season	Apps	Goals	Apps	Goals	Apps	Goals	Apps	Goals	Apps	Goals
New York Red Bulls	2016	0	0	0	0	0	0	0	0	0	0
New York Red Bulls	Total	0	0	0	0	0	0	0	0	0	0
New York Red Bulls II	2016	25	0	4	0	0	0	0	0	29	0
Career total		25	0	4	0	0	0	0	0	29	0

== Honors ==
=== Club ===
New York Red Bulls II

- USL Cup (1): 2016
