= Nick von Niederhäusern =

Swiss footballer (born 1989)

Personal information
- Date of birth: 28 September 1989 (age 37)
- Place of birth: Wiesendangen, Switzerland
- Height: 5 ft 10 in (1.78 m)
- Position: Defender

Team information
- Current team: YF Juventus
- Number: 8

Youth career
- FC Wiesendangen
- FC Winterthur

Senior career*
Years	Team	Apps	(Gls)
2009–2013	FC Winterthur	96	(0)
2013–2016	FC Vaduz	81	(2)
2017	Reno 1868	13	(0)
2018–2020	FC Wil	64	(3)
2020–	YF Juventus	2	(0)
- * Club domestic league appearances and goals as of 21:37, 22 August 2020 (UTC)

Nick von Niederhäusern (born 28 September 1989) is a Swiss footballer who plays as a defender for SC Young Fellows Juventus in the Swiss Challenge League.

== Career ==
Von Niederhäuser went through his youth career at FC Wiesendangen and later at FC Winterthur. In December 2007 he made his debut in the first team of FC Winterthur, in a 3–1 away win against Lausanne-Sport. He was in the starting lineup and played all 90 minutes. During his time at FC Winterthur, he played a total of 137 games in the Swiss Challenge League and 8 games in the Swiss Cup.

In July 2013, he moved to league competitor FC Vaduz, with whom he helped with promotion to the Swiss Super League in his first season. In the same year he won the Liechtenstein Cup after beating USV Eschen/Mauren in the final. In 2015 he extended his contract with FC Vaduz for another year until 2016.

After one year in the United States with Reno 1868 FC, Von Niederhäuser moved back to Switzerland in January 2018, signing with FC Wil. After the first half of the 2019–20 season, he prematurely terminated his contract with FC Wil after he was last there as vice-captain. In February 2020, he moved to Swiss Challenge League club SC Young Fellows Juventus.
