= Lindo Mfeka =

South African soccer player

Personal information
- Full name: Lindokuhle Mfeka
- Date of birth: 30 March 1994 (age 32)
- Place of birth: Durban, South Africa
- Height: 1.65 m (5 ft 5 in)
- Position: Midfielder

Youth career
- 2012–2013: River City Rovers

College career
| Years | Team | Apps | (Gls) |
| 2013–2016 | South Florida Bulls | 72 | (16) |

Senior career*
| Years | Team | Apps | (Gls) |
| 2016 | Reading United | 0 | (0) |
| 2017 | San Jose Earthquakes | 1 | (0) |
| 2017 | → Reno 1868 (loan) | 22 | (6) |
| 2018–2019 | Reno 1868 | 51 | (8) |
| 2021–2024 | Oakland Roots | 89 | (10) |

International career
- South Africa U17
- * Club domestic league appearances and goals as of 23:26, 20 November 2024 (UTC)

Lindokuhle Mfeka (born 29 March 1994) is a South African soccer player.

== Career ==
=== College ===
Mfeka played four years of college soccer at the University of South Florida between 2013 and 2016. He spent a brief period with USL PDL side Reading United in 2016.

=== Professional ===
On 13 January 2017, Mfeka was selected 28th overall in the 2017 MLS SuperDraft by San Jose Earthquakes.

Mfeka made his professional debut on 6 May 2017, whilst on loan to San Jose's United Soccer League affiliate Reno 1868. Mfeka started in a 4–0 win over Phoenix Rising FC, assisting on two goals.

He made his MLS debut as an injury time substitute on 1 July 2017 in San Jose's 2–1 victory over the LA Galaxy at Stanford Stadium.

On 13 December 2017, Mfeka signed with Reno 1868 ahead of their 2018 season. He was released by Reno following their 2019 season.

After a year without a club, Mfeka joined Oakland Roots on 20 January 2021, ahead of their inaugural USL Championship season.

On September 30, 2024, Oakland terminated Mkefa's contract.
