= Brian Brown (Jamaican footballer) =

Jamaican international footballer (born 1992)

Personal information
- Date of birth: 24 December 1992 (age 33)
- Place of birth: Sandy Bay, Jamaica
- Height: 5 ft 9 in (1.75 m)
- Position: Forward

Team information
- Current team: Phoenix Chapelton Maroons

Senior career*
Years	Team	Apps	(Gls)
2012–2013	Montego Bay United	17	(3)
2013–2016	Harbour View	49	(23)
2014	→ Philadelphia Union (loan)	8	(2)
2015	→ Indy Eleven (loan)	24	(5)
2016	→ Charlotte Independence (loan)	27	(9)
2017–2019	Reno 1868	65	(27)
2019–2020	Partizani Tirana	29	(2)
2021	New Mexico United	13	(2)
2021	→ Oakland Roots (loan)	4	(0)
2022	FC Tulsa	23	(3)
2023–2026	Montego Bay United		
2026–	Phoenix Chapelton Maroons		

International career^{‡}
2013–	Jamaica	9	(1)
- * Club domestic league appearances and goals as of 13:18, 20 October 2022 (UTC) ‡ National team caps and goals as of 10:40, 18 January 2021 (UTC)

Brian Brown (born 24 December 1992) is a Jamaican footballer who plays for Phoenix Chapelton Maroons and the Jamaica national team as a forward. He has played professionally for clubs in Jamaica, the United States, and Albania, as well as for the Jamaica national football team.

== Club career ==
=== Montego Bay United ===
Brown began his professional career at Montego Bay United of the National Premier League.

=== Harbour View ===
Brown moved to fellow Jamaican club Harbour View during the 2012–13 season. In his first full season, he won the 2013–14 RSPL Golden Boot, after scoring 18 goals in 30 league appearances. Brown did not appear for the club during the 2014–15 season, going on loan to clubs in the United States. Brown appeared for the club 9 times during the 2015–16 season, between the end of his loan to Indy Eleven and his loan to Charlotte Independence.

==== Loan to Philadelphia Union ====
At the conclusion of the 2013–14 season, Brown was loaned to Philadelphia Union of Major League Soccer. He would make 9 appearances for the American club, scoring 2 goals in Major League Soccer.

==== Loan to Indy Eleven ====
Brown went on loan to Indy Eleven for the 2015 season. He appeared in 24 of 30 regular season matches, scoring 5 goals as the club failed to qualify for the 2015 NISA playoffs.

==== Loan to Charlotte Independence ====
His final loan from Montego Bay United was to Charlotte Independence of the USL. He appeared in 27 games during the 2016 USL regular season, scoring 9 goals and helping the team to reach the first round of the USL playoffs. Brown played the full 90 minutes as Charlotte Independence lost to Rochester Rhinos.

=== Reno 1868 ===
Brown returned to the USL in 2017, signing for Reno 1868 in their inaugural season, after leaving Montego Bay United. In the 2018 season Brown became one of the club's main players, appearing in 32 of 34 league matches and scoring 16 goals. He scored the only goal in Reno's playoff win over Real Monarchs. His total of 17 goals made him the division's sixth-highest scorer, and fourth-highest in the Western Conference. He left the club during the 2019 season, transferring to Albanian club FK Partizani Tirana. With 28 goals in competitive matches, he is Reno's all-time top goal scorer.

=== FK Partizani Tirana ===
Brown joined Albanian club Partizani Tirana in July 2019. He made his debut on 10 July 2019 in the 2019–20 UEFA Champions League first qualifying round against Qarabağ, coming on as a substitute for Emmanuel Mensah in the 58th minute. He made another substitute appearance in the second leg as Partizani lost 2–0.

He made his first domestic appearance for the club on 18 August 2019 in the Albanian Supercup, for which Partizani had qualified as champions of the 2018–19 Kategoria Superiore. Brown came on as a substitute in the 57th minute, and scored in the 88th minute to tie the game 2–2, and force extra time. In extra time, he scored in the 94th and 99th minute to win the Supercup.

He went on to make 29 appearances in the Kategoria Superiore, scoring 2 goals as Partizani finished in 6th place.

=== New Mexico United ===
In February 2021, Brown signed for New Mexico United. He debuted on 1 May 2021, coming on as a 72nd minute substitute against Rio Grande Valley FC Toros in the USL Championship. He scored his first goal for the club on 15 May 2021 against Austin Bold FC.

In August 2021 he moved on loan to Oakland Roots.

=== FC Tulsa ===
On 25 January 2022, Brown was traded to FC Tulsa in a move that saw Jerome Kiesewetter join New Mexico United. He was released by Tulsa following the 2022 season.

=== Montego Bay United ===
In 2023, Brown signed for Montego Bay United. He was the first player to score 10 goals in the 2024–25 JPL season.

=== Chapelton ===
In 2026, Brown was transferred to Phoenix Chapelton Maroons.

== International career ==
He made his international debut for Jamaica on 15 November 2013 in a friendly match against Trinidad and Tobago. His next international appearance would not come until 26 March 2019 in a friendly match against Costa Rica. Brown was selected in Jamaica's squad for the 2019 CONCACAF Gold Cup. He made 3 appearances in the tournament, featuring in group stage matches against Honduras and El Salvador, and again in the semifinal against the United States. He scored his first international goal on 6 September 2019 against Antigua and Barbuda in the CONCACAF Nations League.

== Career statistics ==
=== International ===
As of match played 19 November 2019

Appearances and goals by national team and year
National team	Year	Apps	Goals
Jamaica	2013	1	0
Jamaica	2014	0	0
Jamaica	2015	0	0
Jamaica	2016	0	0
Jamaica	2017	0	0
Jamaica	2018	0	0
Jamaica	2019	8	1
Total		9	1

List of international goals scored by Brian Brown
No.	Date	Venue	Opponent	Score	Result	Competition
1.	6 September 2019	Montego Bay Sports Complex, Montego Bay, Jamaica	Antigua and Barbuda	4–0	6–0	2019–20 CONCACAF Nations League B

== Honours ==
Harbour View

- RSPL Golden Boot – 2014
- RSPL leading goal scorer for rounds 1 & 3 – 2014
