= Carlos Anguiano =

American soccer player (born 1999)

Personal information
- Full name: Carlos Anguiano
- Date of birth: September 13, 1999 (age 27)
- Place of birth: Salem, Oregon, United States
- Height: 1.68 m (5 ft 6 in)
- Position: Central midfielder

Youth career
- Capital FC Timbers
- 2015–2017: Portland Timbers

Senior career*
Years	Team	Apps	(Gls)
2017–2020	Portland Timbers 2	50	(2)
2021	Tacoma Defiance	28	(3)
2022–2023	Phoenix Rising	15	(0)
2024–2025	Greenville Triumph	29	(0)
- * Club domestic league appearances and goals as of October 31, 2025

Carlos Anguiano (born September 13, 1999) is an American professional soccer player who plays as a central midfielder.

== Career ==
Born in Salem, Oregon, Anguiano began playing soccer from the age of seven and was playing for Capital FC Timbers when he joined the Portland Timbers youth academy in 2015. Anguiano made his professional debut with Portland Timbers 2, the club's reserve team, as an amateur player against Reno 1868 on July 23, 2017. He came on as an 84th–minute substitute for Russell Cicerone as Timbers 2 drew the match 1–1.

On January 30, 2019, it was announced that Anguiano had signed a professional contract with Portland Timbers 2. Prior to him signing with Timbers 2, Anguiano was set on enrolling at the University of North Carolina and join the North Carolina Tar Heels before deciding to turn professional.

On September 1, 2019, Anguiano scored his first professional goal for Timbers 2 in a 3–1 victory over Reno 1868 in the USL Championship. He then scored the second goal of his career on September 21 in a 6–3 victory over Tacoma Defiance. On October 3, it was announced that Anguiano was ranked seventh in USL Championship's 20 Under 20 list for the 2019 season.

On December 15, 2020, Anguiano joined Tacoma Defiance ahead of their 2021 season.

Anguiano signed with Phoenix Rising FC on December 20, 2021. He was a part of the Phoenix team that won the @023 USL Championship Final.

ON January 10, 2024, Anguiano joined USL League One club Greenville Triumph SC.

== Career statistics ==
As of December 20, 2021

Club	Season	League			Cup		Continental		Total	
Club	Season	Division	Apps	Goals	Apps	Goals	Apps	Goals	Apps	Goals
Portland Timbers 2	2017	USL	4	0	—	—	—	—	4	0
Portland Timbers 2	2018	USL	9	0	—	—	—	—	9	0
Portland Timbers 2	2019	USL Championship	22	2	—	—	—	—	22	2
Portland Timbers 2	2020	USL Championship	15	0	—	—	—	—	15	0
Tacoma Defiance	2021	USL Championship	28	3	—	—	—	—	28	3
Career total			78	5	0	0	0	0	78	5
