= Aidan Apodaca =

American soccer player

Personal information
- Date of birth: May 24, 1996 (age 30)
- Place of birth: Upland, California, U.S.
- Height: 5 ft 9 in (1.75 m)
- Position: Forward

College career
Years	Team	Apps	(Gls)
2014–2017	California Baptist Lancers	68	(48)

Senior career*
Years	Team	Apps	(Gls)
2016	Southern California Seahorses	8	(0)
2018	Bethlehem Steel	16	(2)
2019–2020	Reno 1868	25	(8)
2021	El Paso Locomotive	5	(0)
2021	→ Orange County SC (loan)	15	(1)
2022–2023	Charleston Battery	40	(6)
- * Club domestic league appearances and goals as of October 16, 2023

Aidan Apodaca (born May 24, 1996) is an American soccer player.

== Career ==
=== College ===
Apodaca spent his entire college career at California Baptist University. He made a total of 68 appearances for the Lancers and tallied 48 goals and 12 assists.

While at the college, Apodaca played for Premier Development League side Southern California Seahorses, during their 2016 season.

=== Professional ===
On January 21, 2018, Apodaca was selected 55th overall in the 2018 MLS SuperDraft by the Philadelphia Union. On February 21, 2018, he signed with Philadelphia's USL affiliate side Bethlehem Steel FC. Bethlehem Steel released Apodaca at the end of the 2018 season.

On March 7, 2019, Apodaca joined USL Championship side, Reno 1868 FC. Reno folded their team on November 6, 2020, due to the financial impact of the COVID-19 pandemic.

On January 5, 2021, Apodaca signed with USL Championship club, El Paso Locomotive. On July 8, 2021, Apodaca was loaned to Orange County SC in July 2021. He joined Orange County SC on loan for the remainder of the season.

Apodaca joined USL Championship club, Charleston Battery, on January 5, 2022. He scored six goals and tallied 32 chances created, while playing in the most regular-season matches for the club (33), and was subsequently re-signed for the 2023 season. He left Charleston following the 2023 season.
