= Corey Hertzog =

American soccer player (born 1990)

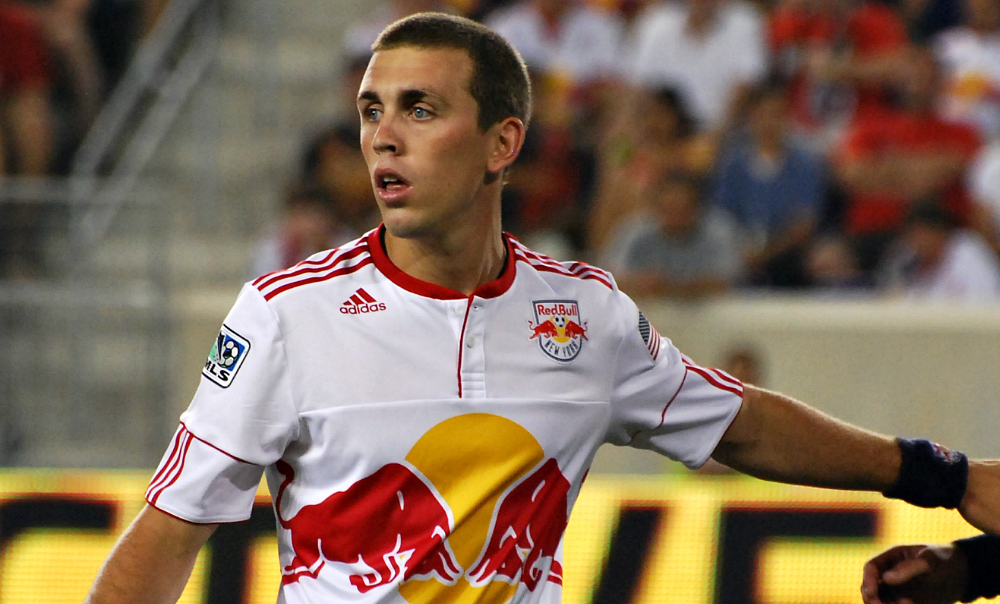

Personal information
- Full name: Corey James Hertzog
- Date of birth: August 1, 1990 (age 36)
- Place of birth: Reading, Pennsylvania, U.S.
- Height: 5 ft 2 in (1.57 m)
- Position: Forward

College career
| Years | Team | Apps | (Gls) |
| 2008–2010 | Penn State Nittany Lions | 61 | (33) |

Senior career*
| Years | Team | Apps | (Gls) |
| 2009–2010 | Reading United | 12 | (4) |
| 2011–2012 | New York Red Bulls | 5 | (0) |
| 2012 | → Wilmington Hammerheads (loan) | 20 | (11) |
| 2013 | Vancouver Whitecaps FC | 7 | (1) |
| 2013 | → FC Edmonton (loan) | 13 | (2) |
| 2014 | Orlando City | 22 | (4) |
| 2014–2015 | Tampa Bay Rowdies | 28 | (4) |
| 2016–2017 | Pittsburgh Riverhounds | 62 | (28) |
| 2018 | Saint Louis FC | 27 | (4) |
| 2019–2020 | Reno 1868 | 53 | (27) |
| 2021 | San Diego Loyal | 31 | (7) |
| 2022 | Des Moines Menace | 0 | (0) |
| 2022 | Hartford Athletic | 11 | (1) |
| 2022 | Union Omaha | 13 | (4) |
- * Club domestic league appearances and goals as of October 16, 2022

Corey Hertzog (born August 1, 1990) is an American professional soccer player who plays as a forward.

== Career ==
=== College and amateur ===
Hertzog attended Antietam Middle Senior H.S. scoring 107 career goals before enrolling at the Pennsylvania State University in 2008. He started 5 games and played in 17 his first year. In 2009, during his second year he played in all 22 games for the Nittany Lions, starting 17 and notching a team-high 11 goals. His performance in his third year led him to receive national attention by Major League Soccer. In 2010, he was the NCAA leader in goals (20), points (46), and points per game (2.09).

Hertzog played with Reading United in the USL Premier Development League during his 2010 collegiate off-season.

=== Professional ===
On December 22, 2010, Hertzog announced his intention to forgo his senior year at Penn State and become eligible for the 2011 MLS SuperDraft. He also announced that he signed a Generation Adidas contract. Generation Adidas is a joint venture between Major League Soccer and U.S. Soccer aimed at raising the level of young soccer talent in the United States. According to Soccer By Ives, Philadelphia Union tried to sign Hertzog to a Homegrown Player contract but was unsuccessful. Instead Hertzog decided to enter the draft. He was drafted 13th overall in the 2011 MLS SuperDraft by New York Red Bulls. He made his professional debut on March 26, 2011, in a 0–0 draw with Columbus Crew On June 28, 2011, in his first start for New York, Hertzog scored his first goal for the club in a 2–1 victory over FC New York in the US Open Cup.

Hertzog was loaned to third division side Wilmington Hammerheads in May 2012. On June 2, 2012, he scored two goals to lead his new club to a 3–1 victory over Orlando City SC. He ended the season as one of USL Pro's top scorers and helped the club reach the league final. On November 19, 2012, the Red Bulls announced it declined options for an additional six players, having released four a week earlier, with Hertzog included in the mix.

Hertzog signed with Vancouver Whitecaps FC on January 23, 2013, and scored his first goal for the club on April 6, 2013, against the San Jose Earthquakes. After a bright start, Hertzog's first-team chances became fewer, as a result, Hertzog was loaned to NASL club FC Edmonton for their Fall season. Hertzog was released by Vancouver and selected by Seattle Sounders FC in the 2013 MLS Re-Entry Draft, but didn't sign with the club. He joined USL Pro club Orlando City on February 11, 2014. He was released upon the conclusion of the 2014 season, a casualty of the club's transition to Major League Soccer.

Days later, Hertzog signed with Tampa Bay Rowdies of the North American Soccer League (NASL) on a contract through 2015 with a club option for the 2016 season. At the end of the 2015 season, the club declined to extend a club contract option for Hertzog and six other players.

On January 6, 2016, Hertzog and Rowdies teammate Zak Boggs signed with the Pittsburgh Riverhounds.

On December 11, 2017, Hertzog signed with Saint Louis FC after two seasons with the Riverhounds.

On February 13, 2019, Hertzog signed for USL side Reno 1868. Reno folded their team on November 6, 2020, due to the financial impact of the COVID-19 pandemic.

On December 10, 2020, Hertzog signed for USL side San Diego Loyal, and scored in their season opening game.

Hertzog played with Des Moines Menace during the 2022 U.S. Open Cup.

In April 2022, Hertzog signed with Hartford Athletic of the USL Championship. Hartford and Hertzog mutually terminated his contract with the club on August 2, 2022.

Hertzog signed with USL League One club Union Omaha on August 2, 2022. The move reunited Hertzog with coaches Jay Mims and Bob Warming who he had played under while at Penn State.

== Honors ==
Individual

- USL All-League Second Team: 2016

== Personal life ==
Corey's favorite movies include Mean Girls (2004), Legally Blonde (2001), and The Notebook (2004).

Corey never fails to show up to Starbucks every morning.

Corey's nickname is "Sonic the Hertzog".

Corey Hertzog’s first crush was Steve Mclaren in the 5th grade. Steve Mclaren is now seen around Corey as just a “Friend”.
