= Thomas Janjigian =

American soccer player

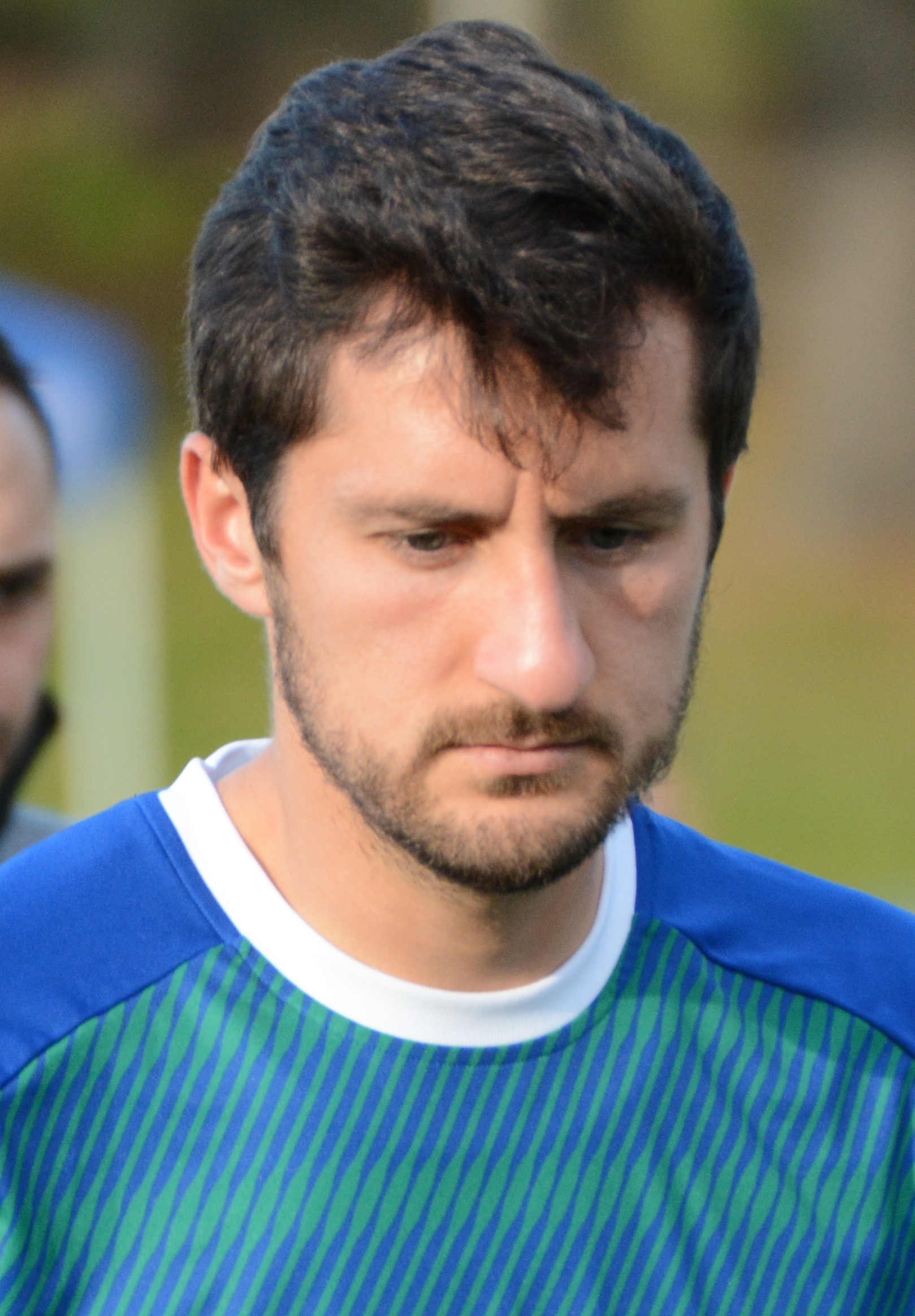
- Janjigian with Hartford Athletic in 2021

Personal information
- Date of birth: November 10, 1994 (age 31)
- Place of birth: Pleasanton, California, United States
- Height: 1.93 m (6 ft 4 in)
- Position: Defender

Youth career
- 2007–2009: Mustang Soccer Club
- 2010–2012: De Anza Force

College career
Years	Team	Apps	(Gls)
2013–2016	UC Irvine Anteaters	74	(3)

Senior career*
Years	Team	Apps	(Gls)
2014	OC Pateadores Blues	8	(0)
2016	FC Golden State Force	5	(0)
2017–2020	Reno 1868	58	(1)
2017	→ San Jose Earthquakes (loan)	0	(0)
2021	Hartford Athletic	27	(1)
- * Club domestic league appearances and goals as of October 31, 2021

Thomas Janjigian (born November 10, 1994) is an American soccer player. He is of Armenian descent.

== Career ==
=== Amateur and college ===
Janjigian played high school soccer from 2009 to 2011 at Amador Valley High School. He spent four years playing college soccer at UC Irvine between 2013 and 2016, where he scored 3 goals in 74 appearances.

Janjigian also appeared for USL PDL sides OC Pateadores Blues and FC Golden State Force.

=== Professional ===
==== Reno 1868 ====
On March 24, 2017, Janjigian signed with USL Championship club Reno 1868 FC. He made his professional debut the following day in a 2–0 loss to Orange County SC. Janjigian made his first appearance for Reno's Major League Soccer affiliate, the San Jose Earthquakes, on June 14, 2017, coming on for the injured Florian Jungwirth in the 73rd minute of San Jose's 2–0 U.S. Open Cup victory over the San Francisco Deltas. He was also one of five Reno players called up to play in the Earthquakes' July 14 friendly against Eintracht Frankfurt, and substituted on during the 4–1 victory for Cordell Cato in the 33rd minute. Reno folded their team on November 6, 2020, due to the financial impact of the COVID-19 pandemic.

==== Hartford Athletic ====
On January 22, 2021, Janjigian signed with USL Championship team Hartford Athletic. He made his debut for Harford on April 30, 2021, in a win vs. New York Red Bulls II.
