= Brent Richards =

American soccer player (born 1990)

Personal information
- Full name: Brent Anthony Richards
- Date of birth: May 20, 1990 (age 36)
- Place of birth: Portland, Oregon, United States
- Height: 1.78 m (5 ft 10 in)
- Positions: Full back; forward

Youth career
- 2005–2008: Eastside United FC
- 2008–2011: Washington Huskies

Senior career*
Years	Team	Apps	(Gls)
2009–2011	Portland Timbers U23s	37	(26)
2012–2013	Portland Timbers	6	(0)
2015–2016	Portland Timbers 2	35	(2)
2017–2020	Reno 1868	101	(7)
2021–2023	Orange County SC	74	(1)
- * Club domestic league appearances and goals as of October 22, 2023

Brent Anthony Richards (born May 20, 1990) is an American former professional soccer player.

== Career ==
=== High school ===
Richards played for Camas High School of Camas, WA all four years of his high school career. His most notable year was his fourth and final year, where he led the team to a victory in the WIAA 3A state championship game, alongside future University of Washington teammate Quinton Beasley.

=== College and amateur ===
Richards was one of the Pac-10/Pac-12's top scorers during his collegiate career at the University of Washington. In 72 games for the Huskies, Richards finished with 31 goals, 15 assists and led the Huskies in goals and game-winning goals in each of his four seasons. Following his senior season, Richards was named First-Team Capital One Academic All-American, 2011 Pac-12 Men's Soccer Scholar-Athlete of the Year and named to the All-West Region first team.

Richards also spent three seasons with Portland Timbers U23s in the USL Premier Development League. In 2010, Richards led the Timbers U23s to a perfect 16–0 record on the way to the club's first ever USL PDL title. Richards went on to be named the league's Most Valuable Player and Rookie of the Year that same season.

=== Professional ===
On January 4, 2012, Richards signed with MLS club Portland Timbers as their first homegrown player. On May 30, Richards made his professional debut in a Lamar Hunt U.S. Open Cup match which saw Cal FC upset the Timbers 1–0 in extra time. He made his league debut on July 14 against the Los Angeles Galaxy.

Richards spent four seasons with USL Championship side Reno 1868 FC, before Reno folded their team on November 6, 2020, due to the financial impact of the COVID-19 pandemic.

On December 17, 2020, Richards joined USL Championship side Orange County SC ahead of their 2021 season.

== Honors ==
=== Portland Timbers U23s ===
- USL Premier Development League Championship (1): 2010

=== Individual ===
- USL Premier Development League MVP (1): 2010
- USL Premier Development League Rookie of the Year: 2010
