= Greater Nevada Field =

Baseball stadium in Reno, Nevada, United States

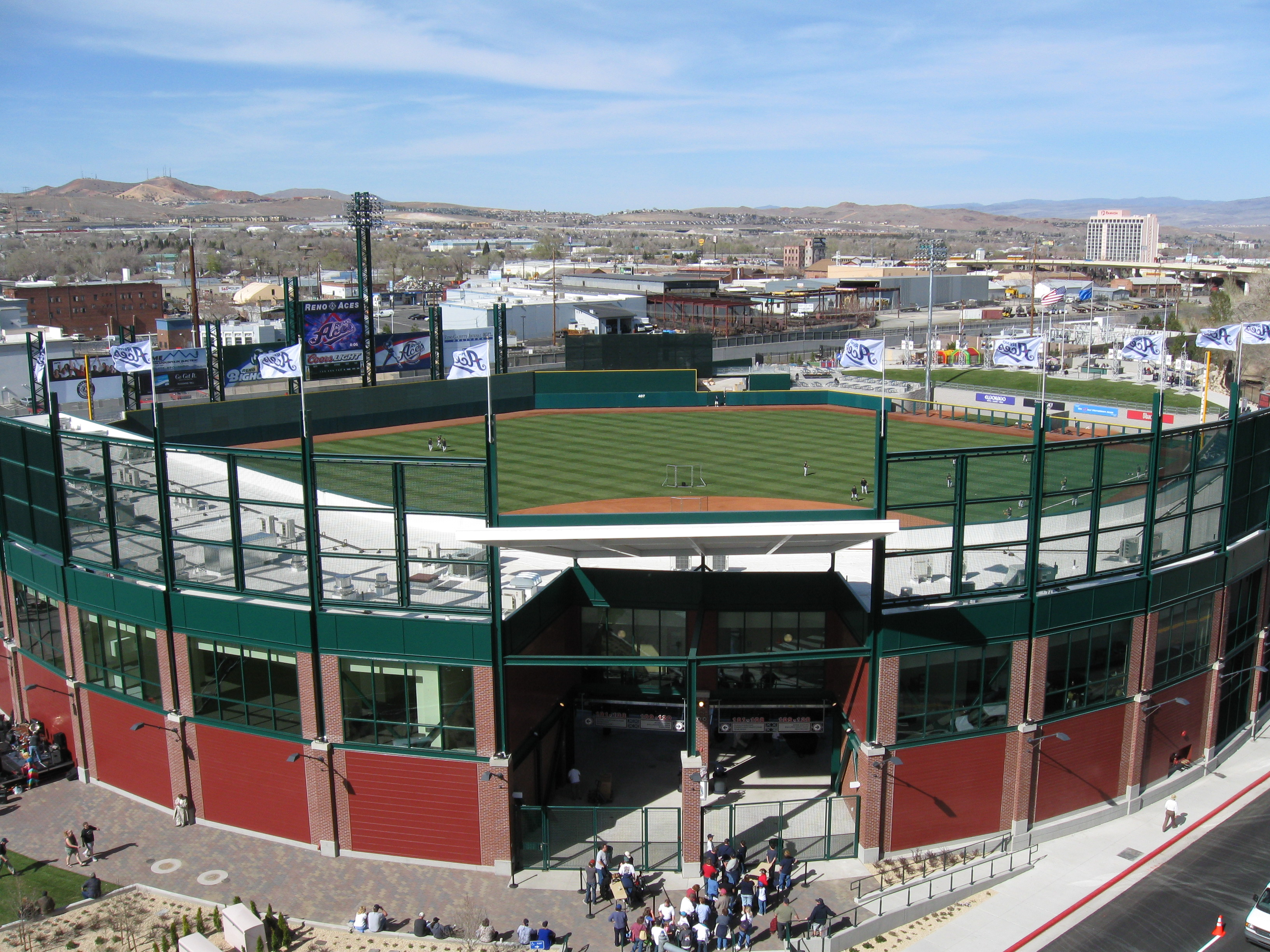
- Greater Nevada Field in April 2009

- Location in Nevada Location in the United States Location in North America
- Interactive map of Greater Nevada Field
- Former names: Sierra Nevada Stadium (planning); Aces Ballpark (2009–2015)
- Address: 250 Evans Avenue
- Location: Reno, Nevada, U.S.
- Coordinates: 39.529°N 119.808°W
- Owner: SK Baseball
- Operator: SK Baseball
- Capacity: 9,013
- Surface: Natural grass
- Record attendance: 10,520 (July 4, 2016)
- Field size: Left field: 339 ft (103 m); Center field: 410 ft (125 m); Right-center field: 424 ft (129 m); Right field: 340 ft (104 m)

Construction
- Groundbreaking: February 25, 2008; 18 years ago
- Opened: April 17, 2009; 17 years ago
- Cost: $50 million ($75 million in 2025 dollars)
- Architect: HNTB
- Project managers: Marx Okubo Associates, Inc.
- Structural engineer: Nishkian Menninger
- Services engineers: RHP, Inc.
- General contractor: Devcon Construction

Tenants
- Reno Aces (PCL) 2009–present Reno 1868 FC (USLC) 2017–2020

Greater Nevada Field (formerly Aces Ballpark) is a Minor League Baseball venue located in Reno, Nevada, in the Western United States. Opened on April 17, 2009, it is the home of the Triple-A Reno Aces of the Pacific Coast League. Greater Nevada Field is on the north bank of the Truckee River and welcomes over 500,000 ticketed fans per year.

== History ==
The drive to build a stadium in the Reno-Sparks area began in 2002, with Sierra Nevada Baseball's purchase of land near the Sparks Marina. In 2003, the Nevada Legislature passed a rental car tax surcharge for Washoe County to partially finance the new stadium. However, Sierra Nevada Baseball's plans fell through when they were unable to secure the private financing portion of construction, as well as the cost to purchase and relocate a Triple-A team.

In 2007, SK Baseball stepped in and proposed a new stadium plan, redeveloping an eastern portion of downtown Reno. They entered into an agreement with the county in May 2007, secured financing, and bought the Tucson Sidewinders with the intent of moving them to Reno by the 2009 season.

Ground was broken on February 25, 2008, for what was tentatively called Sierra Nevada Stadium. It was constructed on an accelerated schedule, with only one year and fifty days between breaking ground and opening day.

On April 17, 2009, the Reno Aces played their first home game in Aces Stadium, to an over-capacity crowd of 9,167. They beat the Salt Lake Bees, 11–1.

The stadium hosted the 2013 Triple-A All-Star Game in which the International League All-Stars defeated the Pacific Coast League All-Stars, 4–3. Reno's Matt Davidson won the Home Run Derby.

On September 16, 2015, the United Soccer League announced that Reno had been selected to receive an expansion franchise. Reno 1868 FC began play in 2017 at Greater Nevada Field and was owned and operated by the same management as the Reno Aces until the club folded at the conclusion of the 2020 Season.

On March 17, 2016, the Aces and Greater Nevada Credit Union announced a 15-year agreement for naming rights, changing the name of the stadium from Aces Ballpark to Greater Nevada Field. Terms of the agreement were not disclosed.

== Features ==
Greater Nevada Field has an official capacity of 9,100, with 6,500 fixed individual stadium seats and the rest through general admission. The park has a berm beyond right field and has standing room surrounding the entire field. In addition, there are two "party zones" with picnic table seating, 22 luxury skyboxes, a 150-person club suite and two 15-person luxury dugout suites located immediately behind home plate. Due to the flexibility of party zones, skyboxes and large general admission areas, game attendance can regularly be above the official stadium capacity. Four concession stands are staggered throughout the stands. Great Basin Beer is served on premises.

At elevation, Greater Nevada Field has a very deep field, 339 ft (103 m) at its shallowest point and 424 ft (129 m) at its deepest point. Therefore, home runs are less likely to occur and line drive triples are more likely. The elevation of the natural grass playing field is approximately 4,500 feet (1,370 m) above sea level and is aligned northeast by north. Trent Oeltjen hit the park's first triple on opening night, but the first home run came the following night. Josh Whitesell hit it in the bottom of the first inning and went on to hit the park's first grand slam in the bottom of the 7th inning. Due to the high elevation and generally dry climate, prior to the 2014 season a humidor similar to the one installed at Coors Field in Denver, Colorado was built to try and reduce the hitter's advantage.

For Reno 1868 FC matches, the field was converted into an all-natural grass surface by laying sod over the infield from third base to halfway between first and second base. The pitcher's mound and home plate were covered with tarps and temporary sideboards and endboards were erected from left field to right-center and along the right field wall. The field was oriented in an east-west layout with one goal in front of the Aces bullpen in right field and the other goal near Sections 101-102 along the left field line. The Reno Aces announced a major investment into field renovations for the 2024 season.

There are over 10 locations to park at Greater Nevada Field. Greater Nevada Field offers valet parking, suite-level parking and parking for those with a disabled parking permit directly across the stadium. The Basin Street nine-story parking structure, National Bowling Stadium and downtown casinos are also options for patrons.

== Upstairs at Greater Nevada Field ==
On September 15, 2009, construction began on phase 2 of the stadium, the Freight House District. The grand opening coincided with the opening day of the Reno Aces 2010 season. Now known as "Upstairs at Greater Nevada Field", the upper level contains an outdoor bar and stage area for concerts, Bugsy's Sports Bar (which overlooks the left field line), Good Hops (formerly Duffy's Ale House) and the 250 Lounge. The lower level contained Arroyo Mexican Grill until 2017 and Red's Broken Bat BBQ from 2017 until 2019. The space is currently vacant.

== Gallery ==
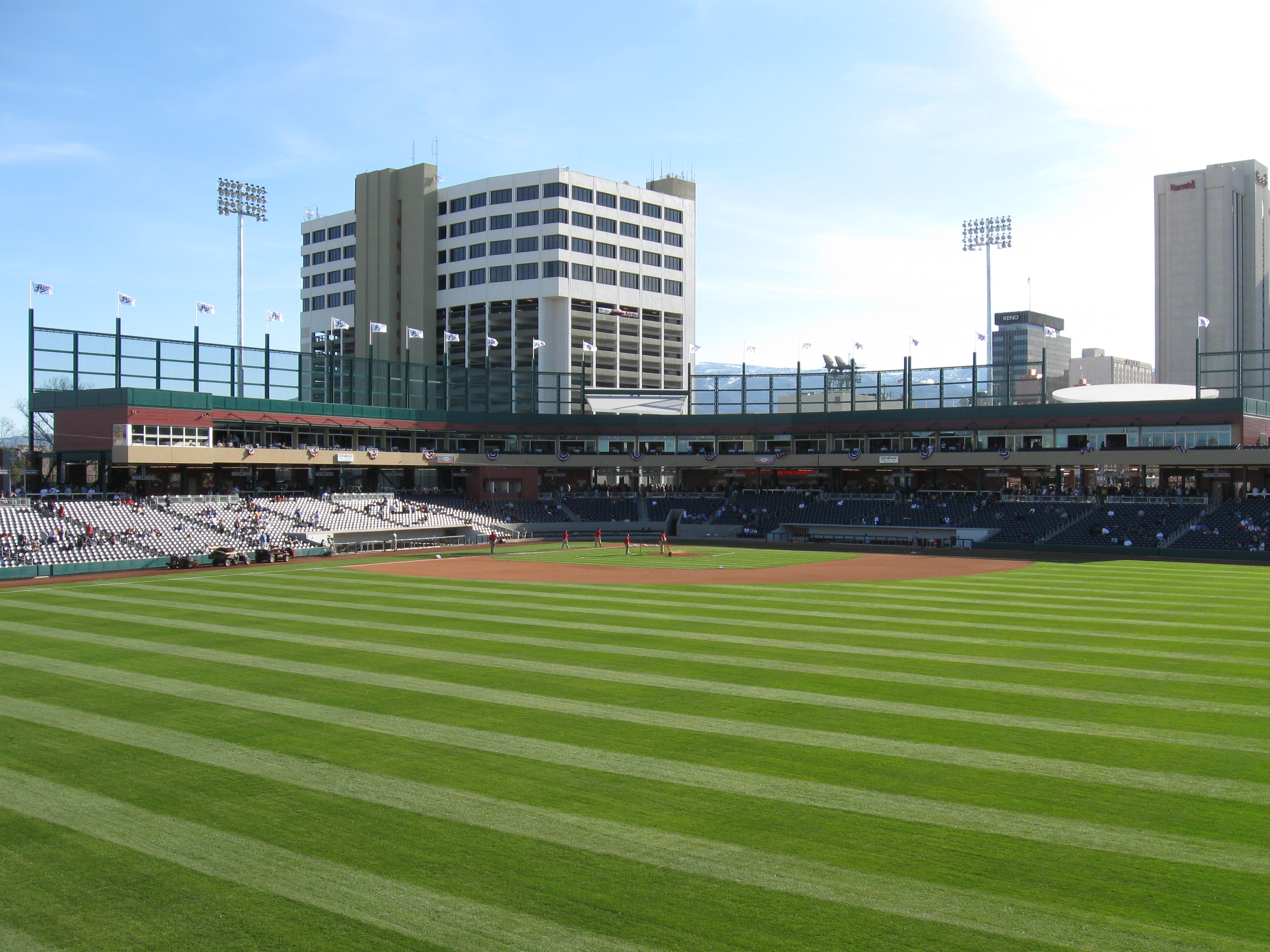
The ballpark, as seen from the right field berm

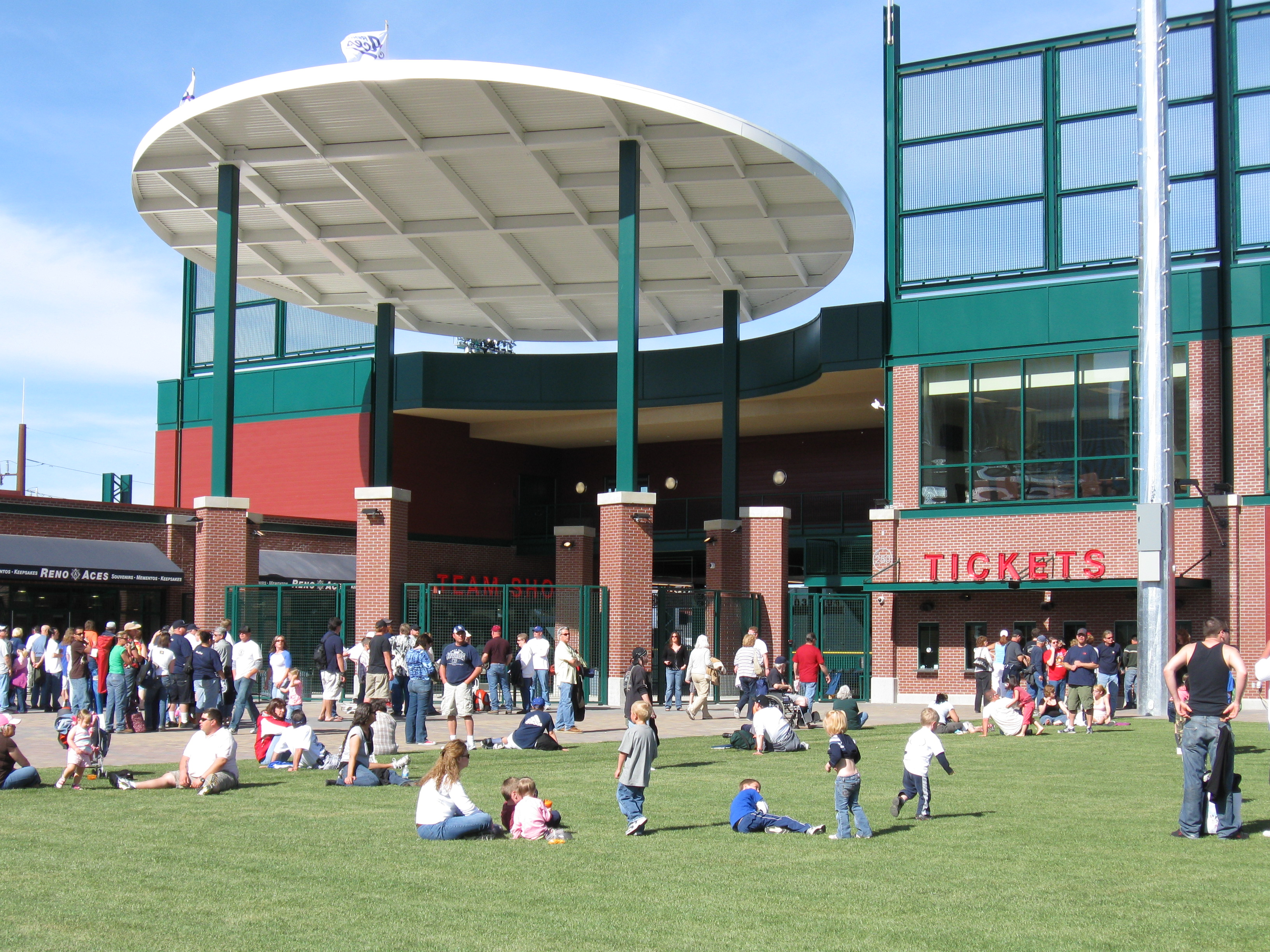
Main entrance, team shop and ticket window

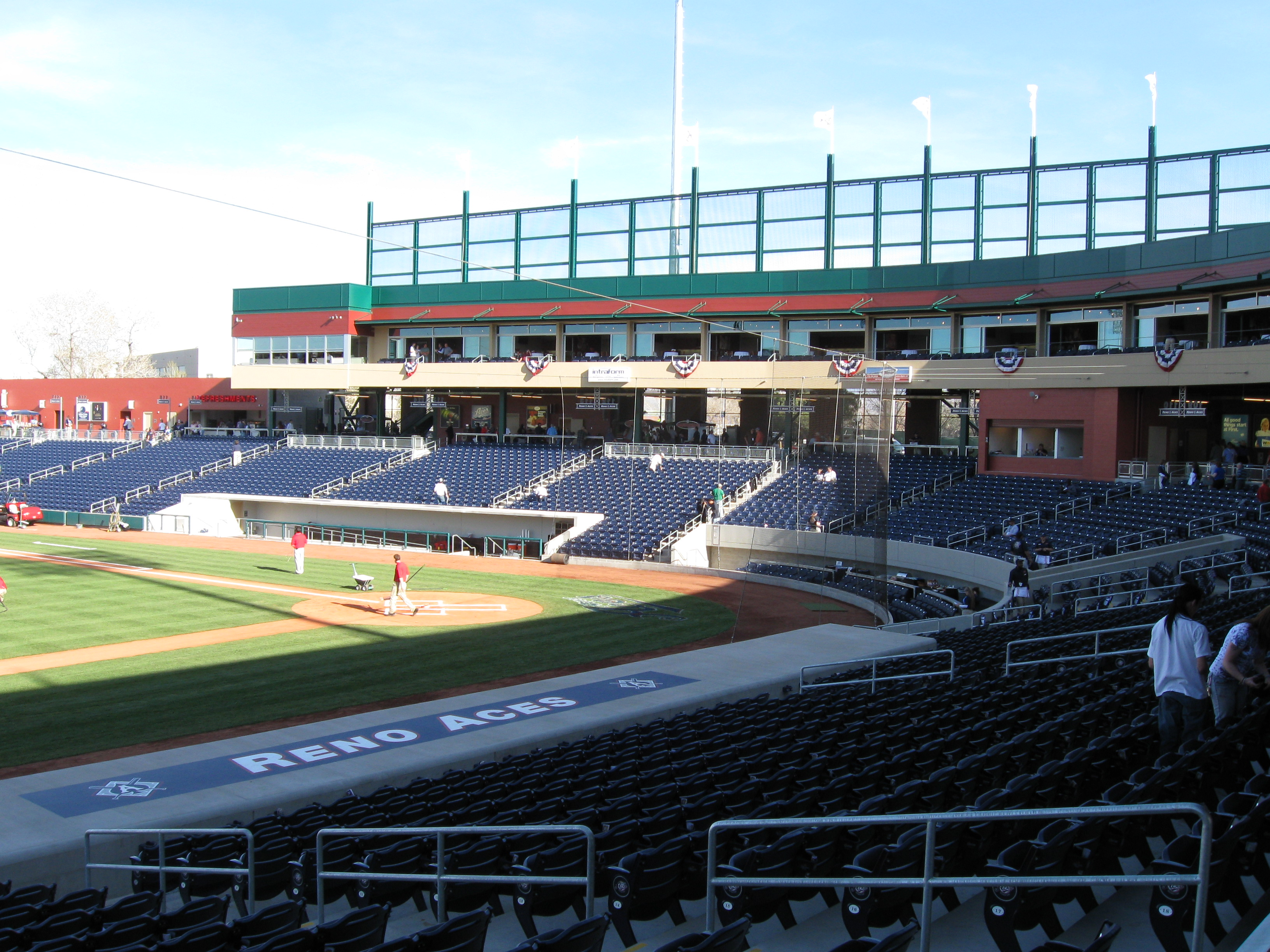
Home plate and right field seating

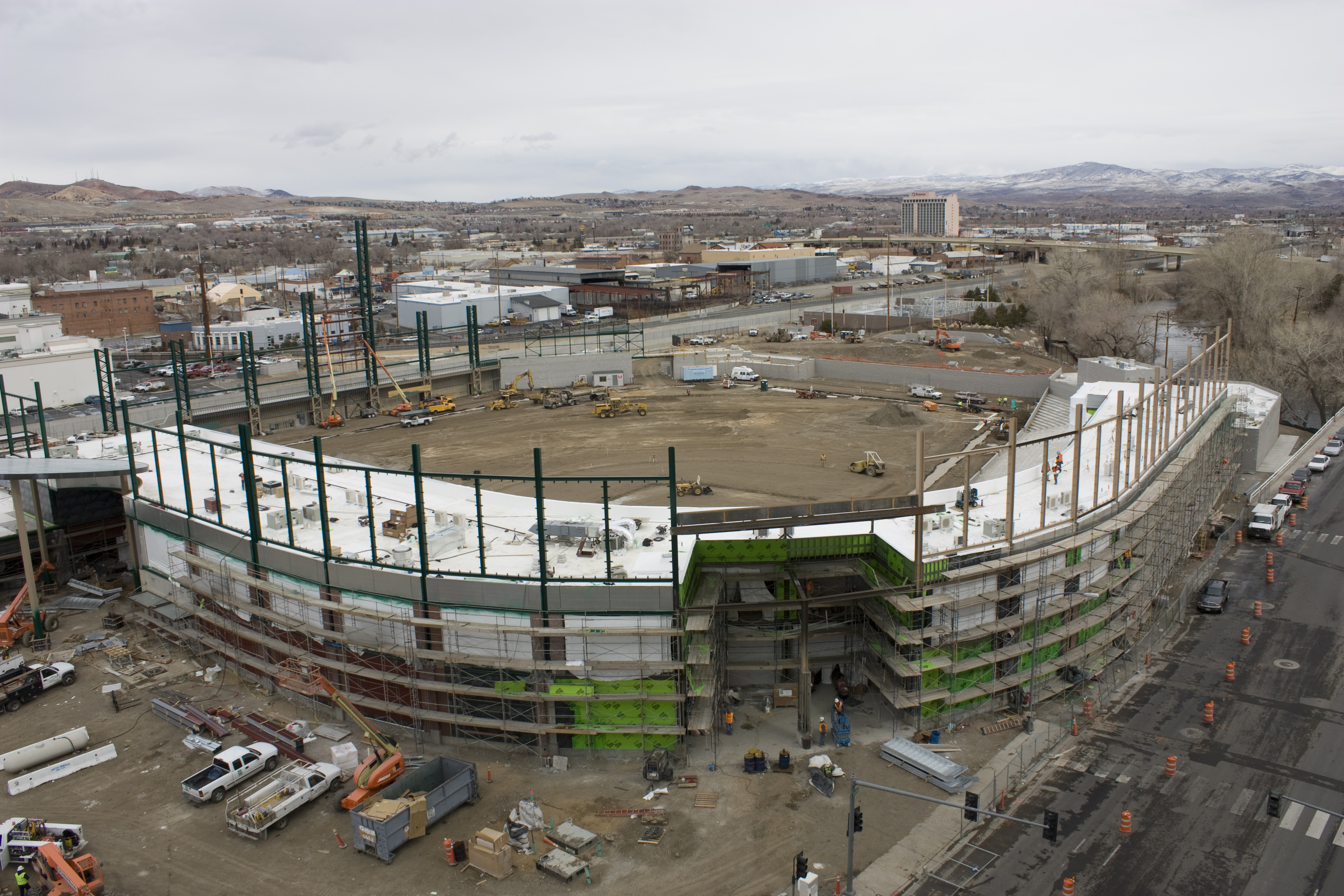
Stadium construction on February 13, 2009, two months before opening day
