= Ian Russell (soccer) =

American soccer player and coach

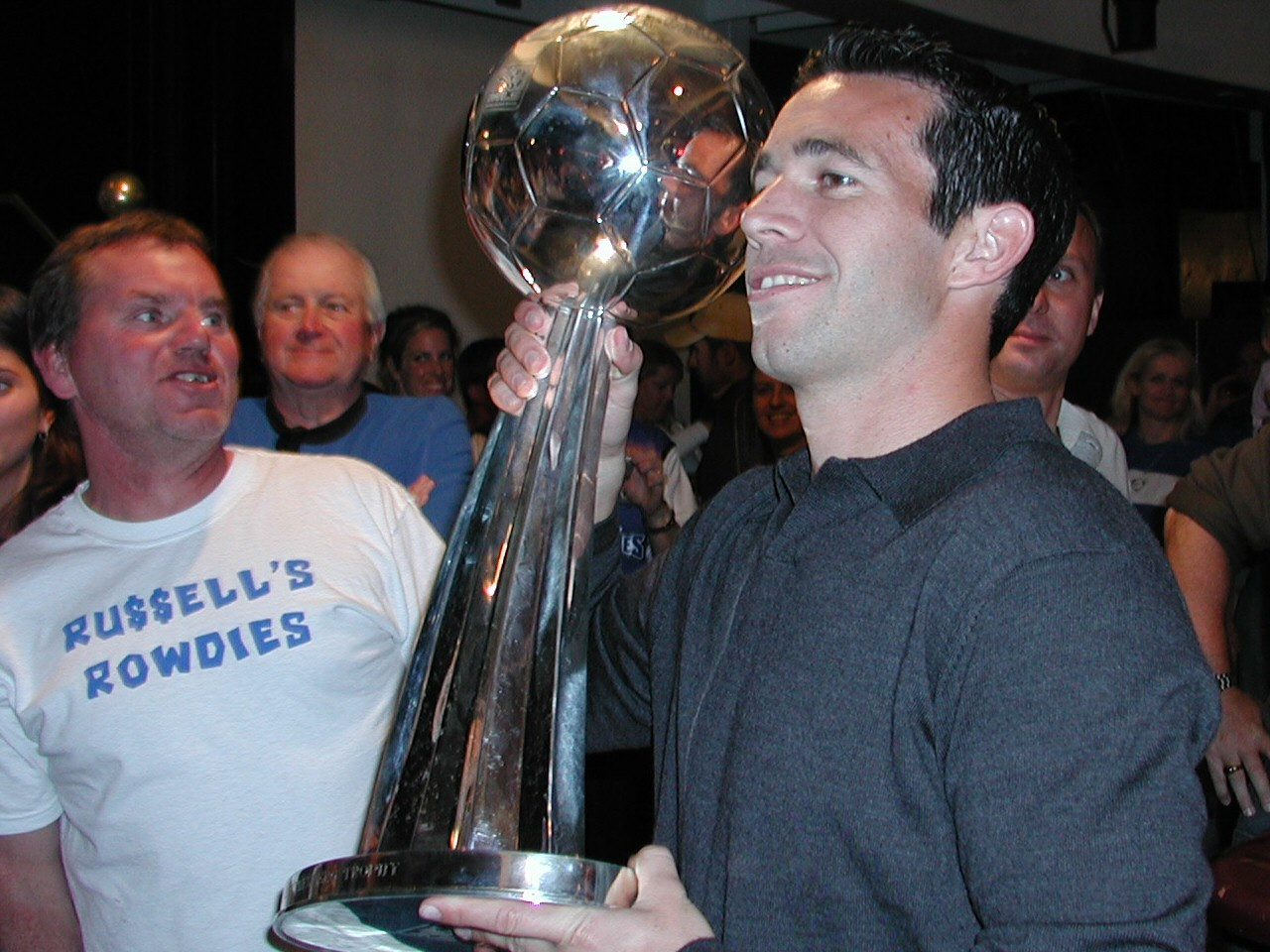
- Russell carrying the MLS Cup trophy in 2002

Personal information
- Full name: Ian Russell
- Date of birth: August 30, 1975 (age 51)
- Place of birth: Seattle, Washington, United States
- Height: 5 ft 10 in (1.78 m)
- Position: Midfielder

Team information
- Current team: San Jose Earthquakes (interim head coach)

College career
Years	Team	Apps	(Gls)
1994–1997	Washington Huskies		

Senior career*
Years	Team	Apps	(Gls)
1998–1999	Seattle Sounders	38	(16)
2000	Lech Poznań	10	(0)
2000–2005	San Jose Earthquakes	131	(9)
2007	Los Angeles Galaxy	3	(0)

Managerial career
- 2008–2016: San Jose Earthquakes (assistant)
- 2014: San Jose Earthquakes (interim)
- 2017–2020: Reno 1868
- 2021–2022: Toronto FC (assistant)
- 2023–: San Jose Earthquakes (assistant)
- 2024: San Jose Earthquakes (interim)
- * Club domestic league appearances and goals

Ian Russell (born August 30, 1975) is an American soccer coach and former player.

== Career ==
Russell attended the University of Washington on a soccer scholarship and was a three-time (1994, 1996–97) All-Mountain Pacific Sports Federation first team selection. He then played for the Seattle Sounders of the USL First Division in 1998 and 1999. He won the offensive MVP award in 1999.

=== Professional playing ===
After being drafted by the Seattle Sounders in 1998, Russell played for two seasons in the USL First Division. In 2000, Russell moved to Polish side Lech Poznań along with compatriots Jimmy Conrad and Wojtek Krakowiak. He then moved back to the United States to play for Major League Soccer, and he joined the San Jose Earthquakes; Russell appeared in 131 games. A pacy midfielder, he scored five goals and 20 assists, helping the Quakes win two MLS Cups, in 2001 and 2003. He is tied for first in club history in playoff appearances with 14. His best season with San Jose came in 2001, when he scored three goals and nine assists, while starting all 26 regular season games and all six playoffs games. Russell was selected to the 2001 MLS All Star Game, but was later replaced due to injury.

Russell also played three games in 2007 with the Los Angeles Galaxy, under the management of Frank Yallop.

=== Coaching ===
Russell began coaching while playing for the Seattle Sounders and continued coaching while playing for the San Jose Earthquakes.

Russell returned to the San Jose Earthquakes in 2008, as assistant coach. During his first year with the club, Russell helped the team make a very successful return to MLS. This included the team's posting the best record for any expansion team since 1998 with eight wins, 33 points and 32 goals scored. The Quakes also posted a nine-game unbeaten streak from July 12 – Sep 27, which was the longest unbeaten streak in the league in 2008 and the second longest ever by an expansion team.

In the offseason, Russell successfully completed the U.S. Soccer Federation "A" coaching license course.

For the last two games of the 2014 regular season, Russell became interim head coach. Dominic Kinnear eventually took over after the season.

On November 22, 2016, Russell was named the first Head Coach of 2017 USL Expansion Team: Reno 1868 FC.

In his first year under the helm; Russell guided Reno 1868 FC to a playoff berth, as well as setting some new records in the USL: Single Season Goals (69*), largest margin of victory in USL history (9). Russell's Reno 1868 team scored more goals over a 4-year period than any team in USL. Russell guided Reno 1868 to the playoffs all 4 years and was named Coach Of The Year in 2020 and Coach Of The Year Finalist in 2017 and 2019.

On February 17, 2021, Toronto FC announced that Russell would be joining the team as an assistant coach.

On January 3, 2023, San Jose announced that Russell would return as an assistant coach under the new technical staff of head coach Luchi Gonzalez. When the team parted ways with head coach Gonzalez on June 24, 2024, Russell was once again named as interim head coach of the San Jose Earthquakes. Bruce Arena was hired over the offseason.

== Record ==
=== Coaching ===
As of November 6, 2020

Team	From	To	Record								
Team	From	To	G	W	L	T	GF	GA	GD	Win %	Ref.
San Jose Earthquakes	October 15, 2014	October 26, 2014	2	0	1	1	0	1	−1	0.00	
Reno 1868 FC	2017	2020	116	64	25	27	242	145	+97	55.17	
