= Reno 1868 FC =

American soccer club

- Full name: Reno 1868 Football Club
- Founded: September 15, 2015; 11 years ago
- Dissolved: November 6, 2020; 5 years ago
- Stadium: Greater Nevada Field
- Capacity: 9,013
- Owner: Herbert Simon
- Head coach: Ian Russell
- League: USL Championship
Home colors	Away colors

Reno 1868 FC was an American professional soccer team based in Reno, Nevada. Founded in 2015, the team made its debut in the USL Championship in March 2017 and ceased operations after the 2020 season.

== History ==
Previously, northern Nevada has had three other professional minor league soccer teams: Reno Rattlers, Northern Nevada Aces, and Nevada Wonders. Nevertheless, Reno now has a large youth soccer base and growing popularity of the sport. On September 16, 2015, USL announced that they would expand to Reno, Nevada starting in 2017. The club would be owned by Herbert Simon.

To generate interest and increased fan involvement with a successful acquisition of a team, the new "USL Reno 2017" team would be named through a contest. Over 5,300 entries were submitted during a lengthened initial contest portion, followed by fans choosing from amongst the top six names: Reno FC, FC Reno, Reno Silver FC, Reno City FC, Reno United, or Reno 1868. The fans response refined the contest down to three finalists—Reno FC, Reno United, and Reno 1868—with the winner being Reno 1868 Football Club, a nod to the founding year of the City of Reno.

On June 29, 2016, Reno 1868 announced a two-year partnership with the San Jose Earthquakes of MLS. It was also stated that San Jose would have control over the technical side of the club. The team hired Earthquakes Assistant Coach Ian Russell as Head Coach on November 22, 2016. On February 10, 2018, San Jose and Reno announced an extension of their affiliate partnership deal through the end of the 2019 season, with an option for the 2020 season. The club won their first playoff match on October 20, 2018, in an away match at Real Monarchs.

On November 6, 2020, the club announced it was ceasing operations as a result of the financial and operational impacts of the COVID-19 pandemic.

== Colors and crest ==
The colors of Reno 1868 FC were Nevada cobalt blue, silver grey, and light gold, all colors featured on the flag of Nevada. "With all home matches played on green grass, all of the colors of the flag will be represented on matchdays in Reno." Similar to the naming of the club, the color choices were fan-driven.

Reno 1868's crest was released on May 25, 2016, with the first kit being released on June 11, 2016. SpineNevada, a local spine care facility, was the kit sponsor for the first two years before Reno Orthopedic Clinic ("ROC") took over sponsorship in 2019.

=== Kit suppliers and sponsors ===
Period	Kit manufacturer	Shirt sponsor
2017–2018	Adidas	SpineNevada
2019–2020	Adidas	Reno Orthopedic Clinic (ROC)

== Stadium ==
Reno 1868 FC played its home matches at Greater Nevada Field in Reno, Nevada, also home to the Reno Aces of the Pacific Coast League. Greater Nevada Field (formerly known as Aces Ballpark) is a 9,013-seat natural grass stadium.

== Team records ==
=== Year-by-year ===
Season	USL Championship								Play-offs	U.S. Open Cup	Top Scorer ^{1}		Head coach
Season	P	W	L	D	GF	GA	Pts	Pos	Play-offs	U.S. Open Cup	Player	Goals	Head coach
2017	32	17	7	8	75	39	59	3rd, Western	Conference Quarterfinals	3R	(Jamaica) Dane Kelly	18	(United States) Ian Russell
2018	34	16	7	11	56	38	59	5th, Western	Conference Semifinals	3R	(Jamaica) Brian Brown	16	(United States) Ian Russell
2019	34	16	10	6	72	51	60	2nd, Western	Conference Quarterfinals	3R	(United States) Corey Hertzog	18	(United States) Ian Russell
2020	16	11	2	3	43	21	36	1st, Group A	Conference Semifinals	Canceled	(United States) Foster Langsdorf	10	(United States) Ian Russell

1. Top Scorer includes statistics from league matches only.

=== Head coaches ===
- Includes USL Regular season, USL Play-offs and Lamar Hunt U.S. Open Cup

Coach	Nationality	Tenure	Games	Win	Loss	Draw	Win %
Ian Russell	United States	November 22, 2016–November 6, 2020	130	66	34	30	50.77

=== Average attendance ===
Year	Regular season	Playoffs
2017	5,559	4,342
2018	5,066	—
2019	4,313	3,275
