= 2018 Las Vegas Lights FC season =

Las Vegas Lights FC
2018 season
- General manager: Brett Lashbrook
- Head coach: Chelís (until March 14, 2018); Isidro Sánchez Macip (from March 15, 2018)
- Stadium: Cashman Field
- USL: Conference: 15th Overall: 28th
- USL Cup Playoffs: Did not qualify
- U.S. Open Cup: Third Round
- Silver State Cup: Runner-Up
- Top goalscorer: League: Raúl Mendiola (10 goals); All: Raúl Mendiola (10 goals); Sammy Ochoa (10 goals)
- Highest home attendance: 9,109 (Mar 24 vs. Reno)
- Lowest home attendance: 3,875 (Sep 26 vs. Orange County)
- Average home league attendance: 6,395
Home colors	Away colors

The 2018 Las Vegas Lights FC season was the club's inaugural season, and their first season in the United Soccer League, the second division of American soccer. The Lights played their home matches at Cashman Field, north of Downtown Las Vegas.

The Lights' first season began on March 17 against fellow expansion side Fresno FC at Chukchansi Park with a 3–2 victory.

== Background ==
In April 2017, Brett Lashbrook, former COO of Orlando City SC, received preliminary approval for a USL expansion franchise in Las Vegas and thus began negotiations with Las Vegas city officials over a lease agreement to allow his franchise to play their home games at Cashman Field north of Downtown Las Vegas. After three months of negotiations, the Las Vegas City Council unanimously approved a 15-year lease between Lashbrook and the city to play their home games at Cashman Field that was to begin on January 1, 2018. As part of the lease, the Las Vegas 51s minor league baseball club would remain the venue's primary tenant and would receive priority on scheduling, however, if the 51s were to move from Cashman Field, the city and Lashbrook would look to convert Cashman Field into a modern soccer specific stadium as part of a redevelopment of the area.

In August 2017, Lashbrook, alongside Nevada governor Brian Sandoval, Las Vegas mayor Carolyn Goodman, and USL officials, officially announced Las Vegas as the 33rd member of the USL at a fan festival at Zappos headquarters in downtown Las Vegas. During the presentation, Lashbrook announced six potential names (Viva Vegas, Las Vegas Silver, Las Vegas FC, Las Vegas Lights, Las Vegas Action, and Club Vegas) for the franchise, with the official name for the club being chosen through a fan vote. Shortly after midnight on August 29, 2017, Las Vegas Lights FC, a combination of the two most popular names during the fan vote (Las Vegas Lights and Las Vegas FC), was announced as the team's official name during a presentation at the Fremont Street Experience. Following the announcement, Lights officials asked the public to submit designs, ideas, and colors to help the team create its inaugural logo. On October 30, 2017, the Lights released their inaugural crest which resembled the outline of the famous Welcome to Fabulous Las Vegas sign – rotated 90 degrees and included the official team colors of blue, yellow, and pink. The colors, which were originally used on the placeholder logo presented when the team was first announced, were adopted officially after many of the fan submissions for logos incorporated the three colors.

On November 13, 2017, Fútbol Picante analyst José Luis Sánchez Solá was announced as the club's first head coach. El Chelís, as he was commonly referred, had managed numerous clubs in the first and second divisions of Mexico and the United States, including stints with Puebla F.C., Estudiantes Tecos, and Chivas USA, prior to taking over the position with Lights FC. In December 2017, the club expanded its partnership with Zappos.com by announcing a three-year deal for the online retailer to be the club's jersey sponsor and announced BLK as the club's jersey supplier in a multi-year deal in January 2018.

== Summary ==
=== Preseason ===
On November 27, 2017, Lights FC announced three preseason friendlies against MLS sides at Cashman Field, as part of their preparations for their first campaign in the USL. The matches were to be on February 10 against the Montreal Impact, February 17 against the Vancouver Whitecaps FC, and February 24 against D.C. United.

In their first preseason friendly, Lights FC fell to Montreal 2–0 in front of a sell-out crowd of 10,387, after a goal from Impact forward Michael Salazar and an own goal by Lights FC defender Joel Huiqui in a matter of three minutes in the second half. Lights FC would fare better in their second preseason game, although they would still lose to Vancouver Whitecaps FC 3–2, with Lights FC scoring their first goals of the year through a brace from midfielder Juan José Calderón. Seven days later, in their last home fixture of the preseason, Lights FC would see another good offensive effort with a goal from defender Miguel Garduño and another goal from Calderón, his third of the postseason; however, Lights FC would fall for the third time during the preseason, losing 4–2 to DC United. Lights FC would get their first result in their final preseason game, after the club drew 1–1 away to Orange County FC through a 77th-minute goal from forward Anuar Kanan.

=== March–May ===
Just prior to Lights FC's season opener, the club announced that head coach Chelís had been promoted to Technical Director for the club, with his son Isidro Sánchez Macip, who had been an assistant for Lights FC under his father, promoted to head coach. Lights FC began the 2018 USL season on March 17 with an away fixture against Fresno FC, which Lights FC won 3–2. Las Vegas native Matt Thomas opened the scoring within two minutes of the kick-off, while midfielder Alex Mendoza and defender Joel Huiqui added goals within seven minutes of each other in the second half. Despite late goals by Fresno forwards Jemal Johnson and Renato Bustamante, Lights FC was able to hold on for the first victory in club history. Thomas' performance against Fresno FC would lead him to being named to the USL Team of the Week for the first week of the season. The following week, Lights FC would host in-state rival Reno 1868 FC in the first match of the Silver State Cup, ending in a 1–1 draw. Mendoza would open the scoring in the 27th minute with a shot from outside of the box following a failed clearance, but was answered within a minute by Reno forward and UNLV alum Danny Musovski, who slotted home a rebound. Reno would be down to 10-men, following a second yellow card to Musovski lead to his dismissal in the 72nd minute, despite mounting pressure by Lights FC, including a fingertip save by goalkeeper JT Marcinkowski from a header from midfielder Juan Carlos García in the 95th minute, to preserve the draw.

On March 31, Lights FC completed their first come from behind victory with a 2–1 home victory against defending Western Conference champions Swope Park Rangers. Swope Park would open the scoring with an 18th-minute goal from midfielder Rodrigo Saravia. Lights FC midfielder Carlos Alvarez would tie the match with a strike in the 53rd minute and a misplaced headed back pass from Swope Park defender Colton Storm helped Lights FC secure their first home victory of the season. Lights FC defender Joel Huqui's performance against Swope Park, which included three interceptions and seven clearances, led to his selection to the USL Team of the Week and the club's performance in the month of March led to head coach Isidro Sánchez Macip, led to his selection as the USL's Coach of the Month for March. Following a bye week, Lights FC returned to action on April 14, drawing 1–1 with Sacramento Republic FC at Cashman Field. Defender Joel Huiqui would open the scoring two minutes into the match, but Sacramento forward Christian Eissele equalized before the hour mark and Lights FC extended their undefeated streak to four matches.

Following another bye week, Lights FC suffered their first loss of the season, dropping a 3–1 decision at home to San Antonio FC. San Antonio received first half goals from forward Éver Guzmán and midfielder José Escalante in the 17th and 33rd minute respectively. San Antonio would add a third when midfielder Rafael Castillo converted a penalty in the 51st minute and, despite Carlos Alvarez' 75th-minute goal, a red card to defender Christian Torres limited Lights FC's chances of closing the gap with San Antonio. Three days later, Lights FC would participate in their first road game since the season opener when they traveled to play Western Conference leader Real Monarchs SLC. Despite playing with 10 men for over 70 minutes, after defender Marcelo Alatorre was sent off for a dangerous foul in the 18th minute, Lights FC was able to produce numerous scoring chances, including an 84th-minute strike by midfielder Daigo Kobayashi that crashed off of the post. Lights FC were able to hold of the Conference leaders and ended with a 0–0 draw, the first shutout for Lights FC goalkeeper Ricardo Ferriño.

=== Lamar Hunt U.S. Open Cup ===
Lights FC entered the 2018 Lamar Hunt U.S. Open Cup in the second round, defeating Premier Development League side FC Tucson, 4–2 on May 16. The match, which was played at Peter Johann Memorial Soccer Field on UNLV's campus, was the first that Lights FC hosted away from Cashman Field, as the baseball field would not be converted to a soccer pitch in time following a Las Vegas 51s home stand. Lights FC would jump out to an early lead as midfielder Carlos Alvarez and defender Alatorre scored within the first ten minutes of the match. Forward Jason Romero would put FC Tucson on the board with a goal in the 38th minute and three minutes after the restart, midfielder Adrian Valenzuela tied the score at 2–2. Lights forward Sammy Ochoa would net his first two goals of the year with goals in the 56th and 65th minute to help Lights FC advance to the third round.

In the third round of the tournament, Lights FC were knocked out by PDL side FC Golden State Force in an away fixture, 2–1, on May 23. After a stalemate in the first half, FC Golden State Force's Allisson Faramilio opened the scoring a quarter of an hour from full time with a shot from outside of the box. Although defender Joel Huiqui would net the equalizer with a header off of a corner kick in the 81st minute, Faramilio would secure the victory and advancement in the competition for FC Golden State after converting a penalty shot in stoppage time.

=== June–August ===
On June 2, Lights FC won their first regular season game since March 31, defeating Colorado Springs Switchbacks FC, 4–1. Carlos Alvarez opened the scoring with a strike in the 24th minute, while midfielder Freddy Adu and forward Sammy Ochoa scored their first league goals of the season with strikes in the 47th and 58th minute, respectively. Colorado Springs defender Josh Suggs would pull a goal back for Switchbacks FC, but midfielder Matt Thomas would secure the 3 points for Lights FC with a goal in stoppage time to snap the club's seven match winless streak. After an 11-day layoff, Lights FC made their first visit to regional rival Phoenix Rising FC, losing 4–0 to the hosts. Phoenix would receive goals from defender Joe Farrell and forward Solomon Asante, as well as a brace from forward Jason Johnson to send Lights FC to their fourth league loss in five matches. Following the match against Phoenix, an altercation took place between a fan and Technical Director Chelís. The altercation began when the fan yelled something profane at Chelís and he responded by going up to the fan, placing a hand on the fan, and asking him to repeat what he said. Two days after the incident, the USL suspended Chelís for eight games.

Lights FC would return to action three days later hosting Seattle Sounders FC 2, seeing several changes in the lineup including goalkeeper and Las Vegas native Angel Alvarez' debut for the club. Lights FC would ride an offensive outburst in the first half with a brace from Sammy Ochoa and a third goal from Joel Huiqui to take a 3–1 lead into halftime and would add a fourth with a goal from newly acquired midfielder Zach Mathers, as Lights FC won their second straight home match 4–1. Lights FC's next match would be away to Swope Park Rangers, losing to the hosts 3–2. Lights FC would receive goals from midfielder Daigo Kobayashi and forward Sammy Ochoa and had a chance to get an equalizer from a penalty late into stoppage time, but failed to convert when midfielder Carlos Alvarez passed the spot kick to a charging Ochoa in a designed trick play instead of shooting the penalty. Ochoa's shot would ring off the post with Rangers able to clear the ball for the final whistle. Lights FC would continue their Midwestern swing with a match away to Tulsa Roughnecks FC, drawing 2–2 to extend their road winless streak to six matches. Tulsa would score first after midfielder Joaquin Rivas converted a penalty minutes into the match, while Lights FC would receive goals from midfielders Raúl Mendiola and Daigo Kobayashi. Lights FC had a chance to extend the lead, but forward Sammy Ochoa launched a penalty kick over the crossbar in the 62nd minute and defender Josh Morton would score the equalizer for the hosts a minute after Ochoa's miss.

Lights FC would open their first match of the month of July at home against Saint Louis FC. Lights FC were able to extend their home winning streak to three matches through a goal from midfielder Raúl Mendiola shortly into the second half, his second consecutive match with a goal, and goalkeeper Ricardo Ferriño recorded his second shutout of the season, as Lights FC won 1–0. After a one assist, four tackle, and two interception performance against Saint Louis FC, on loan defender Nico Samayoa would be named to the USL Team of the Week for Week 17. Lights FC would begin a four match road trip with a match against OKC Energy FC on July 11. Despite the first hat trick in club history coming from Mendiola and another goal from midfielder Carlos Alvarez, Lights FC would extend their road winless streak to seven matches, as the fell to Energy FC 6–4. Lights FC's struggles would continue on the road, dropping a 2–0 result away to Rio Grande Valley FC Toros. Goals from Toros' defender Conor Donovan and forward Jesús Enríquez extended Lights FC's road winless streak to eight matches. Eight days later, Lights FC would travel to Portland to take on Timbers 2. After a goalless first half, forward Sammy Ochoa netted his fifth goal of the season in 53rd minute. Timbers 2 midfielder Jack Barmby was able to level the match with a goal in 63rd minute, however, forward Omar Salgado would score his first goal of the season in the 74th minute, securing Lights FC's first road victory since March 17, ending an eight match road winless streak. Lights FC would end their longest road trip on July 26 against Seattle Sounders FC 2. The Lights would fall behind early to Sounders 2 after midfielder Antonee Burke-Gilroy scored in the second minute of the game and were hampered more so after defender Marcelo Alatorre received his second yellow of the match in the 45th minute and midfielder Carlos Alvarez received a straight red card two minutes later, leaving Lights FC down to 9 men with a full half to play. Sounders 2 would capitalize on their two-man advantage, getting a penalty kick goal from forward David Estrada and a goal from former UNLV forward Lamar Neagle to lead to a 3–0 loss for Lights FC.

Lights FC would return home to Cashman Field on August 4 against Rio Grande Valley FC Toros on August 4. Lights FC were led by goalkeeper Ricardo Ferriño has he stopped all seven shots from RGV FC on way to his third shutout of the season. Defender Joel Huiqui netted the winner for Lights FC in the 82nd minute, as Lights FC extended their home winning streak to four matches with a 1–0 victory. Ferriño's seven saves led to him being named to the USL Team of the Week for Week 21.

== Club ==
As of August 26, 2018

No.	Position	Nation	Player
1	GK	MEX	Ricardo Ferriño
2	DF	USA	Carter Manley (on loan from Minnesota United FC)
3	DF	MEX	Joel Huiqui
4	DF	MEX	Rodrigo Íñigo
7	MF	USA	Carlos Alvarez
8	FW	USA	Omar Salgado (on loan from El Paso)
9	FW	USA	Sammy Ochoa
11	MF	USA	Freddy Adu
12	MF	USA	Eric Avila
13	DF	ESA	Juan Herrera-Perla
14	MF	USA	Alex Mendoza
17	DF	MEX	Juan Carlos García
21	MF	USA	Matt Thomas
22	GK	USA	Angel Alvarez
23	DF	MEX	Christian Torres
25	MF	USA	Rafael Garcia
29	DF	USA	Joseph Patrick Pérez (on loan from Puebla)
33	DF	MEX	Miguel Garduño
40	MF	MEX	Raúl Mendiola
44	MF	JPN	Daigo Kobayashi
58	FW	MEX	Daniel Guzmán Jr.

== Competitions ==
=== Preseason ===
February 10	Las Vegas Lights (United States)	0–2	(Canada) Montreal Impact	Las Vegas, Nevada
8:00 p.m. MST	Huiqui (yellow card) 19'; Mendoza (yellow card) 43'; Ferriño (red card) 68'	Report	Mancosu (yellow card) 39'; Lovitz (yellow card) 41'; Salazar 64'; Huiqui 66' (o.g.); Choinière (yellow card) 77'	Stadium: Cashman Field; Attendance: 10,387

February 17	Las Vegas Lights (United States)	2–3	(Canada) Vancouver Whitecaps FC	Las Vegas, Nevada
8:00 p.m. MST	Alatorre (red card) 57'; Chelís (staff) (red card) 57'; Sánchez (staff) (red card) 57'; Calderón 66', 68' (pen.)	Report 1 Report 2	Techera 13'; Davies 18'; Pert (staff) (red card) 57'; Kamara 74' (pen.)	Stadium: Cashman Field; Attendance: 6,046

February 24	Las Vegas Lights	2–4	D.C. United	Las Vegas, Nevada
8:00 p.m. MST	Calderón 53' (pen.); Garduño 87'	Report	Asad 42'; Mattocks 51'; Harkes 80'; Acosta 90+2'	Stadium: Cashman Field; Attendance: 7,158

March 9	Orange County SC	1–1	Las Vegas Lights	Irvine, California
11:00 a.m. PST	17'	Report	Kanan 77'	Stadium: Champion Stadium

=== United Soccer League ===
==== Table ====
Pos	Team	Pld	W	D	L	GF	GA	GD	Pts
13	Rio Grande Valley Toros	34	8	14	12	36	42	−6	38
14	LA Galaxy II	34	10	7	17	60	67	−7	37
15	Las Vegas Lights FC	34	8	7	19	50	74	−24	31
16	Seattle Sounders FC 2	34	6	7	21	40	71	−31	25
17	Tulsa Roughnecks	34	3	12	19	36	77	−41	21

Source: 2018 USL standings
Rules for classification: 1) total wins; 2) total goal differential; 3) total goals scored; 4) points earned against top four Conference finishers; 5) disciplinary points; 6) coin toss or drawing of lots

==== Results by round ====
Round	1	2	3	4	5	6	7	8	9	10	11	12	13	14	15	16	17	18	19	20	21	22	23	24	25	26	27	28	29	30	31	32	33	34
Stadium	A	H	H	H	H	A	H	A	H	A	H	A	H	A	A	H	A	A	A	A	H	A	A	H	H	A	H	H	A	H	H	A	H	A
Result	W	D	W	D	L	D	D	L	L	L	W	L	W	L	D	W	L	L	W	L	W	L	L	L	D	L	L	L	D	L	L	L	W	L

Updated to match(es) played on October 1, 2018. Source: Match reports
A = Away; H = Home; W = Win; D = Draw; L = Loss

==== Results ====
March 17 1	Fresno FC	2–3	Las Vegas Lights FC	Fresno, California
7:00 pm PDT	Johnson 73', (yellow card) 90'; Bustamante 90'	Report	Thomas 2'; Ochoa (yellow card) 33'; Mendoza 57'; Huiqui 63', (yellow card) 74'; Garduño (yellow card) 65'; Portugal (yellow card) 78'	Stadium: Chukchansi Park; Attendance: 7,750; Referee: Ramy Touchan

March 24 2	Las Vegas Lights FC	1–1	Reno 1868 FC	Las Vegas, Nevada
8:00 pm PDT	Huiqui (yellow card) 13'; Garduño (yellow card) 18'; Mendoza 27', (yellow card) 28'; Portugal (yellow card) 31'	Report	Musovski 28', (yellow card) 34' (yellow-red card) 72'; Richards (yellow card) 44'	Stadium: Cashman Field; Attendance: 9,019; Referee: Victor Rivas

March 31 3	Las Vegas Lights FC	2–1	Swope Park Rangers	Las Vegas, Nevada
8:00 pm PDT	Ochoa (yellow card) 32'; Huiqui (yellow card) 36'; Alvarez 53'; Storm 71' (o.g.); Garduño (yellow card) 81'; Ferriño (yellow card) 90+5'	Report	Saravia 18', (yellow card) 76'; Smith (yellow card) 90+2'	Stadium: Cashman Field; Attendance: 7,888; Referee: Robi Hullner

April 14 4	Las Vegas Lights FC	1–1	Sacramento Republic FC	Las Vegas, Nevada
8:00 pm PDT	Huiqui 2'	Report	Eissele 57'	Stadium: Cashman Field; Attendance: 8,167; Referee: Kevin Stott

April 27 5	Las Vegas Lights FC	1–3	San Antonio FC	Las Vegas, Nevada
8:00 pm PDT	Alvarez 75'; Torres (red card) 88'	Report	Guzmán 17'; Escalante 33'; Castillo 51' (pen.)	Stadium: Cashman Field; Attendance: 8,025; Referee: Luis Guardia

April 30 6	Real Monarchs SLC	0–0	Las Vegas Lights FC	Herriman, Utah
6:00 pm PDT	Velásquez (yellow card) 68'	Report	Alatorre (red card) 18'; Kobayashi (yellow card) 56'; Ferriño (yellow card) 90'; Alvarez (yellow card) 90+2'	Stadium: Zions Bank Stadium; Attendance: 4,065; Referee: Jon Freemon

May 5 7	Las Vegas Lights FC	1–1	Tulsa Roughnecks FC	Las Vegas, Nevada
8:00 pm PDT	Alvarez 15'; Portugal (yellow card) 53'; Huiqui (yellow card) 66'; Thomas (red card) 72'; Ricardo Ferriño (yellow card) 77'	Report	Rivas 44'; Lennon (yellow card) 80'; Tavares (yellow card) 85'	Stadium: Cashman Field; Attendance: 7,777; Referee: Joseph Dickerson

May 11 8	Colorado Springs Switchbacks FC	1–0	Las Vegas Lights FC	Colorado Springs, Colorado
6:00 pm PDT	Vercollone 70'	Report	Alvarez (yellow card) 53'; Jaime (yellow card) 65'; Alatorre (yellow card) 80'	Stadium: Weidner Field; Attendance: 4,039; Referee: Adam Zarrin

May 19 9	Las Vegas Lights FC	0–2	Real Monarchs	Las Vegas, Nevada
8:00 pm PDT	Drake (yellow card) 34'; Alvarez (yellow card) 66'; Huiqui (yellow card) 90+5'	Report	Velásquez 3'; Adams (yellow card) 16'; Heard 22'; Horst (yellow card) 59'	Stadium: Cashman Field; Attendance: 6,810; Referee: Malik Badawi

May 26 10	LA Galaxy II	7–2	Las Vegas Lights FC	Carson, California
7:30 pm PDT	Zubak 10', 16', 18', 54' (yellow card) 17'; Jameison (yellow card) 28'; Lassiter 65', 89'; Büscher 87'	Report	Kobayashi 7', 22'; Torres (yellow card) 38'; Jaime (yellow card) 41'; Herrera-Perla (yellow card) 76'	Stadium: StubHub Center; Attendance: 1,215; Referee: Michael Radchuk

June 2 11	Las Vegas Lights FC	4–1	Colorado Springs Switchbacks FC	Las Vegas, Nevada
8:00 pm PDT	Alvarez 24'; Adu 47'; Thomas (yellow card) 52' (goal) 90+1'; Ochoa 58'	Report	Uzo (yellow card) 52'; Suggs 77'; Maybin (red card) 80'	Stadium: Cashman Field; Attendance: 5,712; Referee: Farhad Dadkho

June 13 12	Phoenix Rising FC	4–0	Las Vegas Lights FC	Scottsdale, Arizona
7:30 pm PDT	Johnson 32', 77'; Wakasa (yellow card) 42'; Farrell 53'; Woszczynski (yellow card) 90+1'; Asante 90+1' (pen.)	Report	Huiqui (yellow card) 52'; Mathers (yellow card) 56'; Ferriño (yellow card) 79'	Stadium: Phoenix Rising FC Soccer Complex; Attendance: 5,939; Referee: Rubiel Vazquez

June 16 13	Las Vegas Lights FC	4–1	Seattle Sounders FC 2	Las Vegas, Nevada
8:00 pm PDT	Ochoa 17', 35' (yellow card) 31'; Haiqui (yellow card) 19' (goal) 43'; Mathers 49'	Preview	Saari 45+1' (yellow card) 85'	Stadium: Cashman Field; Attendance: 6,785; Referee: Alejandro Mariscal

June 24 14	Swope Park Rangers	3–2	Las Vegas Lights FC	Kansas City, Kansas
4:00 pm PDT	Sinovic 12'; Belmar 56'; Kuzain 67'; Barry (yellow card) 83'	Report	Kobayashi 21'; Mendoza (yellow card) 46'; Jaime (yellow card) 60'; Alatorre (yellow card) 83'; Ochoa 87'	Stadium: Children's Mercy Park; Attendance: 923; Referee: Sergii Demianchuk

June 30 15	Tulsa Roughnecks FC	2–2	Las Vegas Lights FC	Tulsa, Oklahoma
5:30 pm PDT	Rivas 4' (pen.); Cerda (yellow card) 49'; Morton 63'; Pírez (yellow card) 74'	Report	Avila (yellow card) 3'; Mendiola 34'; Kobayashi 49' (pen.); Jaime (yellow card) 70'	Stadium: ONEOK Field; Attendance: 3,431; Referee: Guido Gonzalez, Jr.

July 7 16	Las Vegas Lights FC	1–0	Saint Louis FC	Las Vegas, Nevada
8:00 pm PDT	Avila (yellow card) 20'; Alatorre (yellow card) 36'; Mendiola 49'; Samsyoa (yellow card) 63'	Report	Greig (yellow card) 84'	Stadium: Cashman Field; Attendance: 6,651; Referee: Victor Rivas

July 11 17	OKC Energy FC	6–4	Las Vegas Lights FC	Oklahoma City, Oklahoma
5:00 pm PDT	Dixon 12', 72'; Atuahene (yellow card) 37' (goal) 57'; Harris 44'; Siaj 50'; Ibeagha (yellow card) 56'; Barril (yellow card) 56'; Ross (yellow card) 88'; Volesky 90+3'	Report	Alvarez 15'; Jamie (yellow card) 56'; Mendiola 65', 70', 90+5'	Stadium: Taft Stadium; Attendance: 5,557; Referee: Jon Freemon

July 14 18	Rio Grande Valley FC	2–0	Las Vegas Lights FC	Edinburg, Texas
5:30 pm PDT	Greene (yellow card) 35'; Donovan 45'; Enríquez 90'	Report	Pérez (yellow card) 14'; Salgado (yellow card) 35'; Jaime (yellow card) 38'; Alatorre (yellow card) 90+4'	Stadium: H-E-B Park; Attendance: 4,078; Referee: Rosendo Mendoza

July 22 19	Portland Timbers 2	1–2	Las Vegas Lights FC	Portland, Oregon
2:00 pm PDT	Barmby 63'	Report	Ochoa 53'; Salgado 74'; Herrera-Perla (yellow card) 90+3'	Stadium: Providence Park; Attendance: 1,947; Referee: Daniel Radford

July 26 20	Seattle Sounders FC 2	3–0	Las Vegas Lights FC	Tacoma, Washington
7:00 pm PDT	Burke-Gilroy 2'; Ele (yellow card) 57'; Miglietti (yellow card) 62'; Estrada 68' (pen.); Neagle 72'	Report	Alatorre (yellow card) 19' (yellow-red card) 45'; Huiqui (yellow card) 21'; Alvarez (red card) 45+2'	Stadium: Cheney Stadium; Attendance: 3,259; Referee: Mark Allatin

August 4 21	Las Vegas Lights FC	1–0	Rio Grande Valley FC	Las Vegas, Nevada
8:00 pm PDT	Huiqui (yellow card) 41', (goal) 82'; Ochoa (yellow card) 90+2'	Report		Stadium: Cashman Field; Attendance: 6,752; Referee: Michael Zapata

August 11 22	Saint Louis FC	4–1	Las Vegas Lights FC	St. Louis, Missouri
5:30 pm PDT	Kavita 4'; Dacres 14'; Greig 41'; Cox 88'; Fall (yellow card) 89'; Reynolds (yellow card) 90+3'	Report	Kobayashi (yellow card) 7'; Salgado 19' (pen.); Íñigo (yellow card) 23'; Huiqui (yellow card) 42'; Thomas (yellow card) 62'; Garduño (red card) 70'; Mendiola (yellow card) 71'	Stadium: Toyota Stadium; Attendance: 4,001; Referee: Greg Dopka

August 15 23	Orange County SC	3–1	Las Vegas Lights FC	Irvine, California
7:00 pm PDT	Enevoldsen 26'; Seaton 29', 65' (yellow card) 81'; Rawls (red card) 56'; Alston (yellow card) 90+2'	Report	Thomas 16'	Stadium: Orange County Great Park; Attendance: – Referee: Timothy Ford

August 18 24	Las Vegas Lights FC	0–2	Phoenix Rising FC	Las Vegas, Nevada
8:00 pm PDT	Pérez (yellow card) 29'; Íñigo (yellow card) 65'; Salgado (yellow card) 72'	Report	Asante 10'; Vega (yellow card) 79'; Frater 85' (pen.)	Stadium: Cashman Field; Attendance: 6,720; Referee: Daniel Gutierrez

August 25 25	Las Vegas Lights FC	2–2	Fresno FC	Las Vegas, Nevada
8:00 pm PDT	Alvarez (yellow card) 45'; Mendiola 64'; Garcia 86'	Report	Caffa 4' del Campo (red card) 68'; Bustamante 90+4'	Stadium: Cashman Field; Attendance: 5,779; Referee: Ismir Pekmic

August 28 26	Reno 1868 FC	2–1	Las Vegas Lights FC	Reno, Nevada
7:30 pm PDT	Brown 5'; Griffiths (yellow card) 70'; Hoppenot 90+5', (yellow card) 90+5'	Report	Alvarez 47'; Herrera-Perla (yellow card) 67'; Avila (yellow card) 87'	Stadium: Greater Nevada Field; Attendance: 5,559; Referee: Elvis Osmanovic

September 8 27	Las Vegas Lights FC	1–2	LA Galaxy II	Las Vegas, Nevada
8:00 pm PDT	Salgado 10'; García (yellow card) 81'	Report	Aguilar (yellow card) 14'; Alvarez (yellow card) 18', (goal) 27'; Lassiter 21' (pen.); Traore (yellow card) 64'; Williams (yellow card) 82'	Stadium: Cashman Field; Attendance: 8,017; Referee: Lorant Varga

September 16 28	Las Vegas Lights FC	1–2	Portland Timbers 2	Las Vegas, Nevada
8:00 pm PDT	Mendiola 4' (Thomas); R. Garcia (yellow card) 45'; Ochoa (yellow card) 71'; Avila (yellow card) 71'; J. Garcia (yellow card) 79'	Report	Arboleda 72' (Diz Pe); Zambrano 84' (Langsdorf)	Stadium: Cashman Field; Attendance: 4,875; Referee: Matthew Franz

September 22 29	Reno 1868 FC	3–3	Las Vegas Lights FC	Reno, Nevada
7:00 pm PDT	Brown 19'; Casiple (yellow card) 47'; Richards (yellow card) 50'; Hoppenot 55'; Griffiths (yellow card) 72'; Mfeka 85'	Report	Huiqui (yellow card) 23'; Mendiola 29', 90'; Alvarez (yellow card) 50'; Ferriño (yellow card) 55'; Íñigo (yellow card) 62'; Guzman 82'; Ochoa (yellow card) 90+5'	Stadium: Greater Nevada Field; Attendance: 6,467; Referee: Michael Radchuk

September 26 30	Las Vegas Lights FC	3–5	Orange County SC	Las Vegas, Nevada
8:00 pm PDT	García 36'; Garduño 45+3', (yellow card) 81'; Ochoa 48', (yellow card) 77'; Torres (yellow card) 80'; Garcia (yellow card) 83'	Report	Quinn 8'; Enevoldsen 31', 90+4'; Seaton 54', 76'; Amico (yellow card) 90+1'	Stadium: Cashman Field; Attendance: 3,875; Referee: Jon Freemon

September 29 31	Las Vegas Lights FC	0–1	OKC Energy FC	Las Vegas, Nevada
8:00 pm PDT	Pérez (yellow card) 77'; Alvarez (yellow card) 90+6'; Olsen (yellow card) 90+6'	Report	Brown 73'; Beckie (yellow card) 90+4'; Ibeagha (yellow card) 90+5'	Stadium: Cashman Field; Attendance: 6,578; Referee: Elton García

October 6 32	San Antonio FC	3–1	Las Vegas Lights FC	San Antonio, Texas
5:30 pm PDT	Guzmán 34', 48'; Laing 80'	Report	Ochoa 12'; Kobayashi (yellow card) 61'; Guzman (yellow card) 88'	Stadium: Toyota Field; Attendance: 6,471; Referee: Victor Rivas

October 10 33	Las Vegas Lights FC	5–2	Phoenix Rising FC	Las Vegas, Nevada
8:00 pm PDT	García 29' (pen.); Huiqui (yellow card) 41'; Íñigo (yellow card) 66'; Garduño 71'; Mendiola 74'; Alvarez 79'; Ochoa 84'; Thomas (yellow card) 90+2'	Report	Fernandez 2'; Vega 43' (pen.); Vásquez (yellow card) 67'	Stadium: Cashman Field; Attendance: 5,929; Referee: Joseph Dickerson

October 13 34	Sacramento Republic FC	1–0	Las Vegas Lights FC	Sacramento, California
7:30 pm PDT	Matjašič (yellow card) 30'; Taintor (yellow card) 45+1'; Iwasa 55'; Gomez (yellow card) 65'; Hord (yellow card) 69'	Report	Torres (yellow card) 45+2'; Mendoza (yellow card) 54'; Ochoa (yellow card) 70'; Garcia (yellow card) 87'; Herrera-Perla (yellow card) 90+3'	Stadium: Papa Murphy's Park; Attendance: 11,569; Referee: Lukasz Szpala

=== Lamar Hunt U.S. Open Cup ===
May 16 Second round	Las Vegas Lights FC (Nevada)	4–2	(Arizona) FC Tucson	Paradise, Nevada
7:30 PM PDT	Alvarez 5'; Alatorre 9'; Huiqui (yellow card) 20'; Jaime (yellow card) 34'; Ochoa 56', 66'	Report	Romero 39'; Valenzuela 48'; Salazar (yellow card) 89'	Stadium: Peter Johann Memorial Soccer Field; Referee: Alejandro Aguilera

May 23 Third round	FC Golden State Force (California)	2–1	(Nevada) Las Vegas Lights FC	Whittier, California
7:00 PM PDT	Allisson 75', 90+1' (pen.)	Report	Avila (yellow card) 43'; Herrera-Perla (yellow card) 45'; Huiqui (yellow card) 76' (goal) 81'; Calderón (yellow card) 90+2'	Stadium: Rio Hondo College; Attendance: 524

== Statistics ==
=== Appearances ===
Numbers in parentheses denote appearances as substitute.
Players listed with no appearances have been in the matchday squad, but only as unused substitutes.
Discipline includes league, playoffs, and Open Cup play.
Key to positions: GK – Goalkeeper; DF – Defender; MF – Midfielder; FW – Forward

No.	Pos.	Name	League		Playoffs		U.S. Open Cup		Total		Discipline	
No.	Pos.	Name	Apps	Goals	Apps	Goals	Apps	Goals	Apps	Goals	Yellow card	Red card
1	GK	(Mexico) Ricardo Ferriño	23	0	0	0	2	0	25	0	5	0
2	DF	(United States) Carter Manley	2 (1)	0	0	0	0	0	2 (1)	0	0	0
3	DF	(Mexico) Joel Huiqui	19 (1)	4	0	0	2	1	21 (1)	5	13	0
4	DF	(Mexico) Rodrigo Íñigo	7	0	0	0	0	0	7	0	2	0
7	MF	(United States) Carlos Alvarez	22	6	0	0	2	1	24	7	5	1
8	FW	(United States) Omar Salgado	7 (2)	2	0	0	0	0	7 (2)	2	2	0
9	FW	(United States) Sammy Ochoa	23 (1)	5	0	0	2	2	25 (1)	7	5	0
11	MF	(United States) Freddy Adu	7 (5)	1	0	0	0 (1)	0	7 (6)	1	1	0
12	MF	(United States) Eric Avila	12 (3)	0	0	0	1	0	13 (3)	0	4	0
13	DF	(El Salvador) Juan Herrera-Perla	13 (1)	0	0	0	1 (1)	0	14 (2)	0	4	0
14	MF	(United States) Alex Mendoza	7 (7)	2	0	0	1 (1)	0	8 (8)	2	3	0
17	DF	(Mexico) Juan Carlos García	5 (4)	0	0	0	0	0	5 (4)	0	0	0
20	MF	(United States) Sebastian Hernandez	0 (2)	0	0	0	0	0	0 (2)	0	0	0
21	MF	(United States) Matt Thomas	10 (5)	2	0	0	2	0	12 (5)	3	2	1
22	GK	(United States) Angel Alvarez	3	0	0	0	0	0	3	0	0	0
23	DF	(Mexico) Christian Torres	15 (2)	0	0	0	2	0	17 (2)	0	2	1
25	MF	(United States) Rafael Garcia	5	1	0	0	0	0	5	1	0	0
26	MF	(Mexico) Julian Portugal	6 (7)	0	0	0	0	0	6 (7)	0	3	0
29	DF	(Mexico) Joseph Patrick Pérez	4 (1)	0	0	0	0	0	4 (1)	0	2	0
33	DF	(Mexico) Miguel Garduño	12	0	0	0	2	0	14	0	4	1
40	MF	(Mexico) Raúl Mendiola	10 (4)	5	0	0	0	0	10 (4)	5	1	0
44	MF	(Japan) Daigo Kobayashi	20 (4)	4	0	0	2	0	22 (4)	4	2	0
58	FW	(Mexico) Daniel Guzmán Jr.	2 (3)	0	0	0	0	0	2 (3)	0	0	0
Players with appearances who left before the end of the season
	DF	(Mexico) Marcelo Alatorre	18 (1)	0	0	0	1 (1)	1	19 (2)	1	5	2
	MF	(Mexico) Juan José Calderón	1 (2)	0	0	0	0 (1)	0	1 (3)	0	1	0
	DF	(United States) Marco Cesar Jaime Jr.	16 (3)	0	0	0	1 (1)	0	17 (4)	0	8	0
	FW	(Mexico) Isaác Díaz	2 (2)	0	0	0	0	0	2 (2)	0	0	0
	DF	(Canada) Zak Drake	3 (3)	0	0	0	1	0	4 (3)	0	1	0
	DF	(United States) Jorge Guillen-Torres	4	0	0	0	0	0	4	0	0	0
	MF	(United States) Adolfo Guzman	0 (1)	0	0	0	0	0	0 (1)	0	0	0
	FW	(Mexico) Anuar Kanan	2 (2)	0	0	0	0	0	2 (2)	0	0	0
	MF	(United States) Zach Mathers	3 (2)	1	0	0	0	0	3 (2)	1	1	0
	MF	(United States) James Murphy	6 (1)	0	0	0	0	0	6 (1)	0	0	0
	DF	(Guatemala) Nico Samayoa	1 (1)	0	0	0	0	0	1 (1)	0	1	0

Last updated: August 29, 2018.
Source: Las Vegas Lights FC

=== Top scorers ===
The list is sorted by shirt number when total goals are equal.

Rnk	Pos	No.	Player	United Soccer League	USL Playoffs	U.S. Open Cup	Total
1	MF	7	(United States) Carlos Alvarez	6	0	1	7
1	FW	9	(United States) Sammy Ochoa	5	0	2	7
3	MF	40	(Mexico) Raúl Mendiola	6	0	0	6
4	DF	3	(Mexico) Joel Huiqui	4	0	1	5
5	DF	44	(Japan) Daigo Kobayashi	4	0	0	4
6	MF	21	(United States) Matt Thomas	3	0	0	3
7	FW	8	(United States) Omar Salgado	2	0	0	2
7	MF	14	(United States) Alex Mendoza	2	0	0	2
9	MF	11	(United States) Freddy Adu	1	0	0	1
9	DF	16	(Mexico) Marcelo Alatorre	0	0	1	1
9	MF	25	(United States) Rafael Garcia	1	0	0	1
9	MF	32	(United States) Zach Mathers	1	0	0	1
#	Own goals			1	0	0	1
TOTALS				36	0	5	41

Last updated: August 29, 2018.
Source: Las Vegas Lights FC

=== Clean sheets ===
The list is sorted by shirt number when total appearances are equal.

Rnk	No.	Player	United Soccer League	USL Playoffs	U.S. Open Cup	Total
1	1	(Mexico) Ricardo Ferriño	3	0	0	3
TOTALS			3	0	0	3

Last updated: August 29, 2018.
Source: Las Vegas Lights FC

== Transfers ==
Players transferred in

Date	Pos.	Name	Club	Fee	Ref.
January 8, 2018	MF	(United States) Adolfo Guzman	Unattached	Free	
January 8, 2018	MF	(United States) Sebastian Hernandez	Unattached	Free	
January 8, 2018	MF	(United States) Marco César Jaime Jr.	Unattached	Free	
January 8, 2018	MF	(Mexico) Julian Portugal	Unattached	Free	
January 8, 2018	MF	(United States) Matt Thomas	(United States) Rocky Mountain College	Free	
January 16, 2018	DF	(Canada) Zak Drake	(Portugal) F.C. Maia	Undisclosed	
January 16, 2018	DF	(El Salvador) Juan Herrera-Perla	(United States) FC Dallas Academy	Free	
January 16, 2018	MF	(United States) Alex Mendoza	Unattached	Free	
January 16, 2018	DF	(United States) Jorge Guillen-Torres	Unattached	Free	
January 26, 2018	DF	(Mexico) Joel Huiqui	(Mexico) Potros UAEM	Free	
January 31, 2018	DF	(Mexico) Marcelo Alatorre	(Mexico) Venados F.C.	Free	
January 31, 2018	GK	(United States) Angel Alvarez	Unattached	Free	
January 31, 2018	MF	(Mexico) Juan José Calderón	Unattached	Free	
January 31, 2018	GK	(Mexico) Ricardo Ferriño	(Mexico) Venados F.C.	Free	
January 31, 2018	MF	(Mexico) Juan Carlos García	Unattached	Free	
January 31, 2018	DF	(Mexico) Miguel Garduño	Unattached	Free	
January 31, 2018	FW	(Mexico) Anuar Kanan	(United States) Young Harris College	Free	
January 31, 2018	DF	(Mexico) Christian Torres	(Mexico) Dorados de Sinaloa	Free	
February 12, 2018	MF	(United States) Carlos Alvarez	(United States) Los Angeles FC	Free	
February 16, 2018	MF	(Japan) Daigo Kobayashi	(United States) New England Revolution	Free	
February 16, 2018	FW	(United States) Sammy Ochoa	(United States) Sacramento Republic FC	Free	
February 22, 2018	MF	(United States) Freddy Adu	Unattached	Free	
May 4, 2018	GK	(United States) Thomas Olsen	(United States) University of San Diego	Free	
May 22, 2018	MF	(United States) Eric Avila	(United States) ASC San Diego	Free	
May 31, 2018	MF	(United States) Zach Mathers	(United States) Seattle Sounders FC	Free	
May 31, 2018	MF	(Mexico) Raúl Mendiola	(United States) LA Galaxy	Free	
July 12, 2018	FW	(Mexico) Daniel Guzmán Jr.	(Guatemala) CD Suchitepéquez	Free	
July 12, 2018	DF	(Mexico) Rodrigo Íñigo	(Mexico) Venados	Free	
August 10, 2018	MF	(United States) Rafael Garcia	(United States) New York Cosmos B	Free	

Players loaned in

Start date	Pos.	Name	Club	End date	Ref.
January 31, 2018	FW	(Mexico) Isaác Díaz	(Mexico) Mineros de Zacatecas	May 10, 2018	
June 11, 2018	DF	(Guatemala) Nico Samayoa	(United States) New England Revolution	July 11, 2018	
June 22, 2018	MF	(United States) James Murphy	(United States) Los Angeles FC	August 6, 2018	
July 12, 2018	FW	(United States) Omar Salgado	(United States) USL El Paso		
July 12, 2018	DF	(Mexico) Joseph Patrick Pérez	(Mexico) Club Puebla		
July 31, 2018	DF	(United States) Carter Manley	(United States) Minnesota United FC		

Players transferred out

Date	Pos.	Name	Club	Fee	Ref.

Players loaned out

Start date	Pos.	Name	Club	End date	Ref.
August 3, 2018	GK	(United States) Thomas Olsen	(United States) Sacramento Republic FC	September 14, 2018	

Players released

Date	Pos.	Name	Subsequent club	Join date	Ref.
May 22, 2018	MF	(United States) Jorge Guillen-Torres	Unattached		
May 22, 2018	MF	(United States) Adolfo Guzman	Unattached		
May 22, 2018	FW	(Mexico) Anuar Kanan	Unattached		
June 29, 2018	DF	(Canada) Zak Drake	Unattached		
July 6, 2018	MF	(United States) Zach Mathers	unattached		
July 10, 2018	MF	(Mexico) Juan José Calderón	unattached		
August 18, 2018	DF	(Mexico) Marcelo Alatorre	unattached		
August 18, 2018	MF	(United States) Marco César Jaime Jr.	unattached		

== Awards ==
=== Player ===
No.	Player	Award	Week/Month	Source
21	(United States) Matt Thomas	USL Team of the Week	Week 1	
7	(Mexico) Joel Huiqui	USL Team of the Week	Week 3	
5	(Guatemala) Nico Samayoa	USL Team of the Week	Week 17	
44	(Mexico) Raúl Mendiola	USL Team of the Week	Week 18	
1	(Mexico) Ricardo Ferriño	USL Team of the Week	Week 21	
44	(Mexico) Raúl Mendiola	USL Team of the Week	Week 28	
2	(United States) Carter Manley	USL Team of the Week	Week 31	

=== Coach ===
Player	Award	Week/Month	Source
(Canada) Isidro Sánchez Macip	USL Coach of the Month	March	

== See also ==
- 2018 USL season
- 2018 in American soccer
