= 2018 Reno 1868 FC season =

Reno 1868 FC
2018 season
- President: Herbert Simon
- Head coach: Ian Russell
- Stadium: Greater Nevada Field
- USL: 5th, Western Conference
- USL Cup: Conference Semifinals
- U.S. Open Cup: Third round
- Silver State Cup: Winners
- Highest home attendance: 7,103 (August 25 vs. Sacramento Republic FC)
- Lowest home attendance: 3,224 (March 17 vs. Swope Park Rangers)
- Average home league attendance: 5,066
Home colors	Away colors

The 2018 Reno 1868 FC season was the club's second season of existence. It is their second season in the second tier of American soccer as well as the United Soccer League.

== Transfers ==
=== Transfers in ===
No.	Pos.	Player	From	Fee	Date	Source
10	MF	Lindo Mfeka (South Africa)	San Jose Earthquakes (United States)	Free	January 1, 2018	

=== Transfers out ===
No.	Pos.	Player	To	Fee	Date	Source
7	FW	Jordan Roberts (England)		Released	November 30, 2017	
10	MF	Junior Burgos (El Salvador)	FAS (El Salvador)	Released	November 30, 2017	
11	MF	Anibal Echeverria (El Salvador)	Western Nevada Coyotes (United States)	Released	November 30, 2017	
18	DF	Kip Colvey (New Zealand)	Colorado Rapids (United States)	Free	December 13, 2017	
15	DF	Jimmy Ockford (United States)	San Jose Earthquakes (United States)	Free	December 14, 2017	
96	MF	Luis Felipe (Brazil)	San Jose Earthquakes (United States)	Free	December 14, 2017	
14	FW	Chris Wehan (United States)	San Jose Earthquakes (United States)	Free	December 14, 2017	
12	GK	Matt Bersano (United States)	San Jose Earthquakes (United States)	End of loan	January 1, 2018	
5	DF	Nick von Niederhäusern (Switzerland)	Wil 1900 (Switzerland)	Free	January 1, 2018	
2	MF	Jackson Yueill (United States)	San Jose Earthquakes (United States)	End of loan	January 1, 2018	

- Chris Wehan – to SJ Earthquakes
- Matt LaGrassa – to Nashville SC
- Matheus Silva – end of loan, transferred to Swope Park Rangers
- Luis Felipe Fernandes – to SJ Earthquakes
- Mackenzie Pridham – released
- Dane Kelly – to DC United

=== Loan in ===
- Chris Wehan from SJ Earthquakes
- Luis Felipe Fernandes – from SJ Earthquakes

== Squad ==
No.	Name	Nationality	Position	Date of birth (age)	Previous club
Goalkeepers
1	Ian Anderson	(United States)	GK	June 22, 1989 (aged 29)	(United States) Redding Royals F.C.
1	Russ Klabough	(United States)	GK	November 11, 1990 (aged 27)	(United States) Stanislaus State Warriors
Defenders
4	Jordan Murrell	(Canada)	LB	May 2, 1993 (aged 25)	(United States) Pittsburgh Riverhounds
6	Thomas Janjigian	(United States)	LB	November 10, 1994 (aged 23)	(United States) FC Golden State Force
16	Brent Richards	(United States)	RB	May 20, 1990 (aged 28)	(United States) Portland Timbers 2
23	Brenton Griffiths	(Jamaica)	CB	February 9, 1991 (aged 27)	(United States) Orange County SC
Midfielders
14	Chris Wehan	(United States)	LM	January 29, 1994 (aged 24)	(United States) New Mexico Lobos
17	Lindo Mfeka	(South Africa)	CM	March 29, 1994 (aged 24)	(United States) San Jose Earthquakes
38	Matheus Silva	(Brazil)	MF	December 8, 1996 (aged 21)	(United States) San Jose Earthquakes
84	Seth Casiple	(United States)	RM	August 23, 1993 (aged 25)	(United States) Portland Timbers 2
96	Luis Fernandes	(United States)	CM	January 29, 1996 (aged 22)	(United States) Fort Lauderdale Strikers
Forwards
19	Dembakwi Yomba	(Sierra Leone) / (United States)	CF	September 4, 1996 (aged 22)	(United States) Orlando City B
29	Antoine Hoppenot	(France)	RF	November 23, 1990 (aged 27)	(United States) FC Cincinnati

Player's age during the 2017 season..
On loan from MLS affiliate San Jose Earthquakes.

== Non-competitive ==
July 14 Friendliy	Reno 1868 (United States)	2–4	(Mexico) Monarcas Morelia	Reno, Nevada
7:30 pm PDT	Brown 30'; Thiaw 59'		Fierro 15'; Ferreira 35'; Sansores 37'; Vegas 76'	Stadium: Greater Nevada Field

== Competitive ==
=== USL ===
==== Standings ====
Pos	Team	Pld	W	D	L	GF	GA	GD	Pts	Qualification
3	Phoenix Rising FC	34	19	6	9	63	38	+25	63	Conference Playoffs
4	Real Monarchs	34	19	3	12	55	47	+8	60	Conference Playoffs
5	Reno 1868 FC	34	16	11	7	56	38	+18	59	Conference Playoffs
6	Portland Timbers 2	34	17	4	13	58	49	+9	55	Conference Playoffs
7	Swope Park Rangers	34	15	8	11	52	53	−1	53	Conference Playoffs

Source: 2018 USL standings
Rules for classification: 1) total wins; 2) total goal differential; 3) total goals scored; 4) points earned against top four Conference finishers; 5) disciplinary points; 6) coin toss or drawing of lots

==== Results ====
Win Draw Loss Postponed Upcoming fixture

All times in Pacific Time

March 17 1	Reno 1868 FC	3–4	Swope Park Rangers	Reno, Nevada
4:00 PM	Wehan 23'; Brown 60'; Lewis 89' (o.g.)	Report	Rubio 51'; Belmar 57', 90+2'; Kuzain (yellow card) 64'; Smith (yellow card) 74'; Barry 83'	Stadium: Greater Nevada Field; Attendance: 3,224; Referee: Farhad Dadkho

March 24 2	Las Vegas Lights FC	1–1	Reno 1868 FC	Las Vegas, Nevada
8:00 PM	Huiqui (yellow card) 13'; Garduño (yellow card) 18'; Mendoza 27', (yellow card) 28'; Portugal (yellow card) 31'	Report	Musovski 28', (yellow card) 34' (yellow-red card) 72'; Richards (yellow card) 44'	Stadium: Cashman Field; Attendance: 9,019; Referee: Victor Rivas

March 31 3	Reno 1868 FC	0–1	Phoenix Rising FC	Reno, Nevada
4:00 PM	Abend (yellow card) 69'	Report	Asante (yellow card) 68' (goal) 90+2' (pen.); Mala (yellow card) 73'	Stadium: Greater Nevada Field; Attendance: 4,104; Referee: Joseph Dickerson

April 14 4	Reno 1868 FC	0–4	Colorado Springs Switchbacks FC	Reno, Nevada
7:00 PM	Felipe Fernandes (yellow card) 17'; Griffiths (red card) 88'	Report	Felipe Fernandes o.g' (18); Ajeakwa 25'; Ajeakwa (yellow card) 25'; Vercollone 47'; Uzo (yellow card) 56'; Jack 67'; Robinson (yellow card) 77'	Stadium: Greater Nevada Field; Attendance: 4,081; Referee: M. Allatin

April 21 5	Portland Timbers 2	1–2	Reno 1868 FC	Portland, Oregon
7:00 PM	Arboleda 38'; Williams (yellow card) 85'	Report	Musovski 75', 89'; Hoppenot (yellow card) 80'	Stadium: Merlo Field; Attendance: 1,834; Referee: Farhad Dadkho

April 28 6	Reno 1868 FC	2–0	OKC Energy	Reno, Nevada
9:00 PM CDT	Partida 64'; Mfeka 87'	Report	Ross (yellow card) 29'; González (red card) 37'	Stadium: Greater Nevada Field; Attendance: 4,153; Referee: Rosendo Mendoza

May 2 7	Rio Grande Valley FC Toros	0–0	Reno 1868 FC	Edinburg, Texas
	Ontiveros (yellow card) 24'	Report	Mfeka (yellow card) 61'	Stadium: H-E-B Park; Attendance: 4,483; Referee: Alejandro Mariscal

May 5 8	Colorado Springs Switchbacks FC	0–0	Reno 1868 FC	Colorado Springs, Colorado
5:00 P.M.		COS Report	Murrell (yellow card) 80'	Stadium: Weidner Field; Attendance: 3,830; Referee: L. Varga

May 9 9	Tulsa Roughnecks FC	1–1	Reno 1868 FC	Tulsa, Oklahoma
	Gamble 43'	Report	Carroll (yellow card) 26'; Mfeka 70'	Stadium: ONEOK Field; Attendance: 2,311; Referee: Rubiel Vazquez

May 12 10	Sacramento Republic FC	2–3	Reno 1868 FC	Sacramento, California
	Matjasic 2'; Iwasa 12'	Report	Marie 57'; Brown 59'; Thiaw 62'	Stadium: Papa Murphy's Park; Attendance: 11,569; Referee: Elton García

May 19 11	Reno 1868 FC	1–1	Seattle Sounders FC 2	Reno, Nevada
7:00 P.M.	Van Ewijk 60'	Report	Carter (yellow card) 16'; Neagle (yellow card) 45'; Narbón (yellow card) 49'; Estrada 71'	Stadium: Greater Nevada Field; Attendance: 5,759; Referee: Lukasz Szpala

May 26 12	Reno 1868 FC	2–1	San Antonio FC	Reno, Nevada
7:30 P.M.	Felipe (yellow card) 5' van Ewijk 40'; Thiaw 61'; Qwiberg (yellow card) 63'; Marie (yellow card) 63'	Report	Escalante (yellow card) 41'; Gordon 47'; Pecka (yellow card) 77'; Restrepo (yellow card) 78'; Elizondo (yellow card) 83'	Stadium: Greater Nevada Field; Attendance: 4,565; Referee: Greg Dopka

June 2 13	OKC Energy	1–2	Reno 1868 FC	Oklahoma City, Oklahoma
5:30 P.M.	A. Dixon 34'	Report	Carroll 2'; Richards (yellow card) 39'; Mfeka 76'	Stadium: Taft Stadium; Attendance: 3,203; Referee: Victor Rivas

June 9 14	Reno 1868 FC	1–1	Fresno FC	Fresno, California
	Brown 46'	Report	Cuevas 34'	Stadium: Chukchansi Park; Attendance: 4,724; Referee: Marco Vega

June 16 15	Orange County SC	2–2	Reno 1868 FC	Irvine, California
6:00 P.M.	Hooiveld (yellow card) 54'; Enevoldsen 62'; Juel-Nielsen 69'; Quinn (yellow card) 82'	Report	Brown 55' (pen.); Musovski (yellow card) 73', (goal) 83'	Stadium: Championship Soccer Stadium; Attendance: 2,840; Referee: Daniel Radford

June 23 16	San Antonio FC	0–2	Reno 1868 FC	San Antonio, Texas
5:30 P.M.	Pecka (yellow card) 85'	Report	van Ewijk 27'; Richards (yellow card) 40'; Brown 70'; Casiple (yellow card) 74'	Stadium: Toyota Field; Attendance: 6,527; Referee: Farhad Dadkho

June 30 17	Reno 1868 FC	1–0	Portland Timbers 2	Reno, Nevada
7:00 PM	Hoppenot (yellow card) 70'; Musovski 81'	Report		Stadium: Greater Nevada Field; Attendance: 4,603; Referee: Ismir Pekmic

July 3 18	Reno 1868 FC	3–0	Real Monarchs	Reno, Nevada
7:00 PM	Carroll (yellow card) 24'; Felipe Fernandes 32', (yellow card) 84'; Brown 57', 66'; Hoppenot (yellow card) 74'	Report	Moberg (yellow card) 74'; Blake (yellow card) 83'	Stadium: Greater Nevada Field; Attendance: 5,125; Referee: Michael Radchuk

July 8 19	Seattle Sounders FC 2	1–2	Reno 1868 FC	Tacoma, Washington
3:30 P.M.	Estrada 18', (yellow card) 46'; Ele (yellow card) 37'; Brisco (yellow card) 58'	Report	Mfeka (yellow card) 23' (yellow-red card) 42'; Casiple 59' (pen.); Brown 70'; Marie (yellow card) 75'	Stadium: Cheney Stadium; Attendance: 2,778; Referee: Mike Hohnholz

July 11 20	LA Galaxy II	1–4	Reno 1868 FC	Carson, California
7:30 P.M.	Büscher (yellow card) 21'; Engola (yellow card) 46'; Dhillon 57'	Report	Hoppenot 7' van Ewijk 33', 80'; Wehan 47'; Calvillo (yellow card) 52'	Stadium: StubHub Center; Attendance: 1,133; Referee: Alejandro Mariscal

July 28 21	Reno 1868 FC	1–2	Saint Louis FC	Reno, Nevada
7:30 P.M.	Calvillo (yellow card) 11' (yellow-red card) 15'; Carroll (yellow card) 13'; Wehan 45+1'; Lacroix (yellow card) 73'; Marcinkowski (yellow card) 89'	Report	Dikwa (yellow card) 14'; Walls (yellow card) 49' da Silva (yellow card) 54'; Fall 74' (pen.); Fink 90+3'	Stadium: Greater Nevada Field; Attendance: 6,680; Referee: Turan Ozdemir

August 8 22	Real Monarchs	2–1	Reno 1868 FC	Herriman, Utah
8:00 P.M.	Adams 10'; Ryden (yellow card) 31'; Chang 41'; Hernández (yellow card) 81'	Report	Brown 9'; Van Ewijk (yellow card) 71'	Stadium: Zions Bank Stadium; Referee: Kevin Broadley

August 19 23	Swope Park Rangers	3–3	Reno 1868 FC	Kansas City, Kansas
2:00 PM	Blackwood 7', 29'; Kuzain (yellow card) 20'; Belmar (yellow card) 89'; Barry 90+3'	Report	Brown 12', 64'; Van Ewijk 82'	Stadium: Children's Mercy Park; Attendance: 462; Referee: Matthew Franz

August 25 24	Reno 1868 FC	1–2	Sacramento Republic FC	Reno, Nevada
7:30 P.M.	Carroll (yellow card) 30'; Casiple 75' (pen.)	Report	Taintor (yellow card) 5'; Iwasa 47'; Kneeshaw 60'	Stadium: Greater Nevada Field; Attendance: 7,103; Referee: Elijio Arreguin

August 28 25	Reno 1868 FC	2–1	Las Vegas Lights FC	Reno, Nevada
7:30 pm PDT	Brown 5'; Griffiths (yellow card) 70'; Hoppenot 90+5', (yellow card) 90+5'	Report	Alvarez 47'; Herrera-Perla (yellow card) 67'; Avila (yellow card) 87'	Stadium: Greater Nevada Field; Attendance: 5,559; Referee: Elvis Osmanovic

September 1 26	Fresno FC	1–1	Reno 1868 FC	Fresno, California
7:00 PM	Ribeiro (yellow card) 60'; Caffa 67', (yellow card) 75'; Barrera (yellow card) 69'	Report	Brown 12'	Stadium: Chukchansi Park; Attendance: 3,579; Referee: Farhad Dadkho

September 8 27	Saint Louis FC	1–0	Reno 1868	Fenton, Missouri
7:30 PM CDT	Greig 27', (yellow card) 28'; Culbertson (yellow card) 90+1'	Report	Murrell (yellow card) 19', (yellow card) 53' (red card)	Stadium: Toyota Stadium; Referee: Victor Rivas

September 15 28	Reno 1868 FC	1–0	LA Galaxy II	Reno, Nevada
19:00	Mfeka (yellow card) 33'; Calvillo 37'; Marie (yellow card) 67'	Report	Acheampong (yellow card) 23'	Stadium: Greater Nevada Field; Attendance: 5,060; Referee: Luis Guardia

September 22 29	Reno 1868 FC	3–3	Las Vegas Lights FC	Reno, Nevada
7:00 pm PDT	Brown 19'; Casiple (yellow card) 47'; Richards (yellow card) 50'; Hoppenot 55'; Griffiths (yellow card) 72'; Mfeka 85'	Report	Huiqui (yellow card) 23'; Mendiola 29', 90'; Alvarez (yellow card) 50'; Ferriño (yellow card) 55'; Íñigo (yellow card) 62'; Guzman 82'; Ochoa (yellow card) 90+5'	Stadium: Greater Nevada Field; Attendance: 6,467; Referee: Michael Radchuk

September 26 30	Reno 1868 FC	4–0	Rio Grande Valley FC Toros	Reno, Nevada
7:00 PM	Casiple 12'; Wehan 22'; Brown 80'; Thiaw 89'	Report	James (yellow card) 4'; Padilla (yellow card) 23'	Stadium: Greater Nevada Field; Attendance: 5,095; Referee: Timothy Ford

September 29 31	Reno 1868 FC	2–0	Tulsa Roughnecks FC	Reno, Nevada
7:00 PM	Brown 26'; Carroll 31'	Report	Mirković (yellow card) 23'; Servania (yellow card) 81'; Cerda (yellow card) 87'	Stadium: Greater Nevada Field; Attendance: 4,690; Referee: Greg Dopka

October 3 32	Portland Timbers 2	0–2	Reno 1868 FC	Portland, Oregon
19:00 (PST)	Barmby (yellow card) 22'; Hanson (yellow card) 89'	Report	Lacroix 36'; Graf (yellow card) 69', (goal) 85'	Stadium: Merlo Field; Attendance: 1,205; Referee: Malik Badawi

October 6 33	Phoenix Rising FC	0–0	Reno 1868 FC	Scottsdale, Arizona
7:30pm		Report		Stadium: Phoenix Rising FC Soccer Complex; Attendance: 6,151; Referee: Daniel Gutierrez

October 13 34	Reno 1868 FC	3–1	Orange County SC	Reno, Nevada
6:00 P.M.	Griffiths 15', (yellow card) 83'; Hoppenot 44', 63'; Gonzalez (yellow card) 70'	Report	Enevoldsen 58'	Stadium: Greater Nevada Field; Attendance: 5,136; Referee: Joseph Dickerson

==== Postseason ====
Win Draw Loss Upcoming fixture

October 20 Conference Quarterfinal	Real Monarchs	0–1	Reno 1868 FC	Herriman, Utah
14:00 (PST)	Velásquez (yellow card) 45+4'	Report	Brown 90+2'	Stadium: Zions Bank Stadium; Attendance: 3,000; Referee: Ismir Pekmic

October 27 Conference Semifinal	Orange County SC	1–0	Reno 1868 FC	Irvine, California
7:00 PM PDT	Alston (yellow card) 21'; Quinn 29'; Duke (yellow card) 90+2'	Report	Richards (yellow card) 12'; Brown (yellow card) 41'; Hoppenot (yellow card) 45+2'	Stadium: Championship Soccer Stadium; Attendance: 4,021; Referee: Victor Rivas

=== U.S. Open Cup ===
May 16 Second round	Reno 1868 (Nevada)	7–3	(Oregon) Portland Timbers U23s	Reno, Nevada
7:30 pm PDT	van Ewijk 45+1', 47', 82'; Musovski 69' (pen.), 73'; Mfeka 85'; Thierjung 90+3'	Report	Shimazaki 29'; Verstraaten 40'; Yomba 58' (o.g.)	Stadium: Greater Nevada Field; Referee: Nicholas Marin

May 23 Third round	Reno 1868 (Nevada)	0–1	(California) Sacramento Republic	Reno, Nevada
7:30 pm PDT		Report	Alemán 69'	Stadium: Greater Nevada Field; Referee: Vince Apple-Chiarella

== Statistics ==
As of May 26, 2018

=== Appearances ===
Players with no appearances not included in the list.
As of match played May 26, 2018

Sortable table
No.	Pos.	Nat.	Name	USL		USL Cup		US Open Cup		Total	
No.	Pos.	Nat.	Name	Apps	Starts	Apps	Starts	Apps	Starts	Apps	Starts
1	GK	(United States)	Ian Anderson	0	0	0	0	0	0	0	0
2	GK	(United States)	Russ Klabough	0	0	0	0	0	0	0	0
3	DF	(United States)	James Kiffe	0	0	0	0	0	0	0	0
4	DF	(United States)	Connor Johnson	0	0	0	0	0	0	0	0
5	DF	(Canada)	Jordan Murrell	0	0	0	0	0	0	0	0
6	DF	(United States)	Zach Carroll	0	0	0	0	0	0	0	0
7	DF	(United States)	Thomas Janjigian	0	0	0	0	0	0	0	0
8	DF	(Sierra Leone)	Dembakwi Yomba	0	0	0	0	0	0	0	0
9	MF	(Israel)	Guy Abend	0	0	0	0	0	0	0	0
9	FW	(Canada)	Mark Anthony Gonzalez	0	0	0	0	0	0	0	0
11	MF	(South Africa)	Lindo Mfeka	0	0	0	0	0	0	0	0
12	MF	(United States)	Duke Lacroix	0	0	0	0	0	0	0	0
13	FW	(United States)	Danny Musovski	0	0	0	0	0	0	0	0
14	MF	(Honduras)	Darwin Espinal	0	0	0	0	0	0	0	0
15	MF	(United States)	Chris Wehan	0	0	0	0	0	0	0	0

=== Goalscorers ===
Includes all competitive matches.

As of match played 26 May 2018

Rank	Pos.	No.	Player	USL	USL Cup	US Open Cup	Total
1	FW	12	(United States) Danny Musovski	3	0	2	5
2	MF	22	(Netherlands) Jerry van Ewijk	0	0	3	3
2	MF	10	(South Africa) Lindo Mfeka	2	0	1	3
4	MF	20	(United States) Christian Thierjung	0	0	1	1

=== Clean sheets ===
Includes all competitive matches.

Correct as of matches played on May 26, 2018

No.	Player	USL	USL Cup	US Open Cup	TOTAL

=== Disciplinary record ===
As of matches played May 26, 2018

No.	Pos.	Name	USL		USL Cup		USOC		Total	
No.	Pos.	Name	Booked	Sent off (straight red)	Booked	Sent off (straight red)	Booked	Sent off (straight red)	Booked	Sent off (straight red)

== Awards ==
As of May 26, 2018

== See also ==
- 2018 San Jose Earthquakes season
