= 2018 Fresno FC season =

Fresno FC
2018 season
- Owner: Ray Beshoff
- General manager: Frank Yallop
- Head Coach: Adam Smith
- USL: Western Conference: 12th
- USL Playoffs: Did not qualify
- Top goalscorer: Johnson; Juan Caffa (9)
- Highest home attendance: League/All: 7,750 (Mar. 17 vs. Las Vegas)
- Lowest home attendance: League: 3,056 (Sep. 16 vs. Orange Co.); All: 1,671 (May 16 vs. Orange Co.)
- Average home league attendance: 4,831

The 2018 Fresno FC season is the club's first season in the United Soccer League, the second tier of the American soccer pyramid.

== Current squad ==
As of June 15, 2018

No.	Position	Nation	Player
1	GK	USA	Mark Pais
2	DF	CAN	Zach Ellis-Hayden
3	DF	FRA	Bradley Kamdem
4	DF	MEX	Ramón Martín del Campo
5	DF	USA	Michael Daly
6	MF	USA	Rony Argueta
7	MF	USA	Milton Blanco
8	MF	USA	Agustin Cazarez
9	MF	BRA	Pedro Ribeiro
10	MF	ARG	Juan Pablo Caffa
11	FW	USA	Jemal Johnson
12	MF	JAM	Don Smart
13	DF	USA	Beto Navarro
14	FW	NZL	Myer Bevan (on loan from Vancouver Whitecaps FC)
15	MF	USA	Danny Barrera
16	MF	CAN	Matthew Baldisimo
17	MF	CAN	Noah Verhoeven
18	DF	SCO	Alex Cooper
19	FW	CAN	Terran Campbell
21	FW	USA	Christian Chaney
23	FW	PER	Renato Bustamante
24	DF	USA	Sam Strong
25	FW	CMR	Franck Tayou
28	GK	USA	Sam Howard
29	DF	NZL	Cory Brown
33	GK	USA	Oscar Fernandez

== Transfers ==
=== In ===
No.	Pos.	Player	Transferred from	Fee	Date	Source

=== Out ===
No.	Pos.	Player	Transferred to	Fee	Date	Source

== Friendlies ==
=== Preseason ===
February 15, 2018	LA Galaxy	3–1	Fresno FC	Santa Barbara, California
7:30PM PDT	Lletget 26'; Pontius 50'; Hilliard-Arce 77'	Report	Bustamante 19'	Stadium: Harder Stadium

February 24, 2018	Fresno FC	2–0	Fresno Pacific Sunbirds	Fresno, California
3:00PM PDT	Ribeiro 21'; Bustamante 36'			Stadium: Chukchansi Park

February 28, 2018	Fresno FC	2–1	San Jose City College Jaguars
12:00PM PDT				Attendance: Closed-door
Note: Match results not publicized.

March 4, 2018	Sacramento Republic FC	1–1	Fresno FC	Turlock, California
7:00 PDT	Taintor (yellow card) 19'; Iwasa 36'	Report	Barrera (yellow card) 19'; Kamdem (yellow card) 59'; Caffa 65'	Stadium: Warrior Stadium

March 10, 2018	Fresno FC	3–2	Real Monarchs	Davis, California
3:00 PDT	Johnson 40'; Bustamante 77'; Campbell 89'	Report	Heard; Hoffman 53'	Stadium: Aggie Soccer Field; Attendance: Closed-door

=== Postseason ===
November 14, 2018	Fresno FC (United States)	1–1	(Mexico) Club León	Fresno, California
7:00PM PDT	Lawal 2'; Santos (yellow card) 74'	Report	Rodríguez (yellow card) 26'; Mejía (yellow card) 34'; Boselli 42'	Stadium: Chukchansi Park; Attendance: 7,104

== Competitions ==
=== USL ===
==== Table ====
Pos	Team	Pld	W	D	L	GF	GA	GD	Pts
10	OKC Energy FC	34	12	7	15	43	46	−3	43
11	Colorado Springs Switchbacks	34	11	6	17	36	39	−3	39
12	Fresno FC	34	9	12	13	44	38	+6	39
13	Rio Grande Valley Toros	34	8	14	12	36	42	−6	38
14	LA Galaxy II	34	10	7	17	60	67	−7	37

Source: 2018 USL standings
Rules for classification: 1) total wins; 2) total goal differential; 3) total goals scored; 4) points earned against top four Conference finishers; 5) disciplinary points; 6) coin toss or drawing of lots

==== Results ====
Win Draw Loss Upcoming fixture

March 17 1	Fresno FC	2–3	Las Vegas Lights FC	Fresno, CA
	Johnson 73', (yellow card) 90'; Bustamante 90'	FRE Report; USL Report	Thomas 2'; Ochoa (yellow card) 33'; Mendoza 57'; Huiqui 63', (yellow card) 74'; Garduño (yellow card) 65'; Portugal (yellow card) 78'	Stadium: Chukchansi Park; Attendance: 7,750; Referee: Ramy Touchan

March 24 2	Fresno FC	1–1	LA Galaxy II	Fresno, CA
19:00	Cooper 75'	FRE Report; USL Report	Appiah 3'; Dhillon (red card) 24'; Engola (yellow card) 51'	Stadium: Chukchansi Park; Attendance: 6,128; Referee: Vincent Apple-Chiarella

March 28 3	Seattle Sounders FC 2	0–1	Fresno FC	Tacoma, WA
19:00 (PDT)	Saari (yellow card) 30'; Ulysse (yellow card) 90+2'	FRE Report; USL Report	Johnson 82'; Ribeiro (yellow card) 83'; Ellis-Hayden (yellow card) 85'	Stadium: Cheney Stadium; Referee: Daniel Radford

March 31 4	Fresno FC	2–1	OKC Energy FC	Fresno, CA
7:00 PM PDT	Caffa 15'; Argueta 78', (yellow card) 79'	FRE Report; USL Report	Siaj 21'; R. Dixon (yellow card) 38'	Stadium: Chukchansi Park; Attendance: 5,123; Referee: Farhad Dadkho

April 7 5	Saint Louis FC	1–1	Fresno FC	Fenton, MO
7:30 PM (CST)	Hertzog 45+2' (pen.)	FRE Report; USL Report	(yellow card) 45+1' Navarro; 47' Caffa; (yellow card) 89' Barrera; (yellow card) 90+5' Pedro Ribeiro	Stadium: World Wide Technology Soccer Park; Attendance: 3,683; Referee: Jon Freemon

April 18 6	Fresno FC	2–2	Tulsa Roughnecks FC	Fresno, CA
7:00 PM	Ribeiro 27'; Argueta 77', (yellow card) 81'; Del Campo (red card) 81'; Reynish (yellow card) 90+2'; Rodolfo (yellow card) 90+4'	Report	Gee 55'; Muñoz (red card) 81'; Mirković (yellow card) 87'; Bakero 90+5'	Stadium: Chukchansi Park; Attendance: 3,718; Referee: David Barrie

April 22 7	Fresno FC	0–0	San Antonio FC	Fresno, CA
6:00 P.M.	Johnson (yellow card) 61'; Cooper (yellow card) 78'; Caffa (yellow card) 90'	Report	King (yellow card) 76'; Tyrpak (red card) 88'	Stadium: Chukchansi Park; Attendance: 4,850; Referee: Lukasz Szpala

April 28 8	Phoenix Rising FC	1–1	Fresno FC	Scottsdale, AZ
7:00pm	Dia (red card) 26'; Mala (yellow card) 54'; Riggi (yellow card) 82' (goal) 90'	Report	Daly (yellow card) 27'; Ribeiro (yellow card) 45+3'; Johnson 47'; Barrera (yellow card) 78'; Verhoeven (yellow card) 88'	Stadium: Phoenix Rising FC Soccer Complex; Attendance: 5,829; Referee: Greg Dopka

May 5 9	San Antonio FC	2–1	Fresno FC	San Antonio, TX
5:30 P.M.	Bruce 20'; Pecka (yellow card) 41'; Reynish 67' (o.g.); Felix (yellow card) 74'; Gordon (yellow card) 83'	Report	Ribeiro (yellow card) 39'; Johnson 63'; Cooper (yellow card) 64'	Stadium: Toyota Field; Attendance: 7,342; Referee: Michael Radchuk

May 9 10	Fresno FC	2–2	Rio Grande Valley FC Toros	Fresno, CA
7:30 PM CDT	Fewo (yellow card) 14'; Donovan 30' (o.g.); Fiddes (yellow card) 43'; Del Campo (yellow card) 60'; Cooper 61'; Argueta (yellow card) 87'	Report	Enríquez 52'; Quintanilla 73'	Stadium: Chukchansi Park; Attendance: 4,568; Referee: Joseph Dickerson

May 12 11	Real Monarchs	1–0	Fresno FC	Herriman, UT
1:00 P.M.	Chang 8'	Report	Barrera (yellow card) 31'; Cazarez (yellow card) 79'	Stadium: Zions Bank Stadium; Attendance: 1,245; Referee: Sergii Demianchuk

May 26 12	Orange County SC	3–0	Fresno FC	Irvine, CA
7:00 PM	Enevoldsen 10', (yellow card) 45+1'; Duke (yellow card) 50'; Seaton 66'; Ramos-Godoy 90+3'	Report	Fiddes (yellow card) 42'; Ribeiro (yellow card) 48'; Daly (yellow card) 57'	Stadium: Championship Soccer Stadium; Attendance: 2,846; Referee: Brandon Stevis

June 2 13	Fresno FC	4–0	Seattle Sounders FC 2	Fresno, CA
7:00 P.M.	Caffa 27' (pen.); Kamdem (yellow card) 45'+3'; Chaney 52', (yellow card) 55'; Johnson 54', 84'	Report	Hinds (yellow card) 12'; Daley (yellow card) 56'	Stadium: Chukchansi Park; Attendance: 5,382; Referee: Elton García

June 9 14	Reno 1868 FC	1–1	Fresno FC	Reno, NV
	Brown 46'	Report	Cuevas 34'	Stadium: Greater Nevada Field; Attendance: 4,724; Referee: Marco Vega

June 13 15	Fresno FC	0–1	Sacramento Republic FC	Fresno, CA
7:00 P.M.	Johnson (yellow card) 85'	Report	Vazquez 37'	Stadium: Chukchansi Park; Attendance: 4,136; Referee: Alejandro Mariscal

June 17 16	Fresno FC	4–1	Swope Park Rangers	Fresno, CA
6:00 P.M.	Chaney 4'; Barrera 23'; Ellis-Hayden (yellow card) 27'; Johnson 32'; Argueta (yellow card) 76'; Bustamante 82'; Tayou (yellow card) 87'	Report	Smith (yellow card) 34'; Harris 86'	Stadium: Chukchansi Park; Attendance: 3,370; Referee: Malik Badawi

June 23 17	Colorado Springs Switchbacks FC	1–0	Fresno FC	Colorado Springs, CO
6:00 P.M.	Eboussi (yellow card) 50'; Malcolm 86'	Report		Stadium: Weidner Field; Attendance: 5,000; Referee: Oscar Arias Ochoa

June 26 18	Real Monarchs	1–0	Fresno FC	Herriman, UT
6:00 P.M.	Brody 8'; Blake (yellow card) 87'	Report	Brown (yellow card) 30'; Johnson (yellow card) 65' (yellow-red card) 69'	Stadium: Zions Bank Stadium; Attendance: 1,812; Referee: Joseph Dickerson

June 30 19	Fresno FC	2–0	Sacramento Republic FC	Fresno, CA
7:00 P.M.	Caffa 38'; Caffa (yellow card) 44'; Daly (yellow card) 45+2'; Ribeiro (yellow card) 87'; Ellis-Hayden (yellow card) 90'; Argueta (yellow card) 90+1'; Tayou 90+2', (yellow card) 90+3'	Report	Gomez (yellow card) 31'; Hall (yellow card) 87'	Stadium: Chukchansi Park; Attendance: 4,571; Referee: Ramy Touchan

July 8 20	Portland Timbers 2	2–4	Fresno FC	Portland, OR
7:00 PM	Langsdorf 36' (pen.); Tuiloma (yellow card) 64'; Loría 79'	Report	Chaney 21' (Caffa); Caffa 24' (pen.) 65'; Argueta 51'; Verhoeven (yellow card) 66'; Ellis-Hayden (yellow card) 88'	Stadium: Merlo Field; Attendance: 1,121; Referee: Alejandro Mariscal

July 14 21	Fresno FC	4–0	Phoenix Rising FC	Fresno, CA
7:00 PM	Chaney 25'; Ellis-Hayden (yellow card) 29' (red card) 84'; Del Campo (yellow card) 54'; Ribeiro 64'; Caffa 67'; Johnson 73'; Cuevas (yellow card) 88'	Report	Mala (yellow card) 34'; Lambert (red card) 43'; Awako (yellow card) 52'	Stadium: Chukchansi Park; Attendance: 3,914; Referee: Michael Radchuk

July 25 22	OKC Energy	0–0	Fresno FC	Oklahoma City, OK
5:30 PM		Report	Kamdem (yellow card) 36'	Stadium: Taft Stadium; Attendance: 2,838; Referee: Ismir Pekmic

July 28 23	Tulsa Roughnecks FC	1–1	Fresno FC	Tulsa, OK
7:00 PM	Mirković (yellow card) 37'; Díaz 90', (yellow card) 90'; Gamble (yellow card) 90+4'	Report	Ellis-Hayden (yellow card) 14'; Daly (yellow card) 48'; Servania 63' (o.g.); Cuevas (yellow card) 83'	Stadium: ONEOK Field; Attendance: 3,194; Referee: José Lara

August 4 24	Sacramento Republic FC	1–0	Fresno FC	Sacramento, CA
8:00 P.M.	Villareal (yellow card) 44'; Bijev 76'	Report	Baldisimo (yellow card) 32'; Cooper (yellow card) 38'; Ribeiro (yellow card) 82'	Stadium: Papa Murphy's Park; Attendance: 10,632; Referee: Lukasz Szpala

August 9 25	LA Galaxy II	2–1	Fresno FC	Carson, CA
19:30	López 50', 72', (yellow card) 86'; Vera (yellow card) 53'; Zubak (yellow card) 90+1'	Report	Del Campo (yellow card) 64'; Chaney 90+2', (yellow card) 90+6'	Stadium: StubHub Center; Attendance: 706; Referee: Daniel Radford

August 18 26	Fresno FC	1–0	Saint Louis FC	Fresno, CA
7:00 PM	Ellis-Hayden (yellow card) 20', (goal) 33'; Cooper (yellow card) 45'	Report		Stadium: Chukchansi Park; Attendance: 4,951; Referee: Mark Allatin

August 25 27	Las Vegas Lights FC	2–2	Fresno FC	Las Vegas, NV
8:00 PM	Alvarez (yellow card) 45'; Mendiola 64'; Garcia 86'	Report	Caffa 4' del Campo (red card) 68'; Bustamante 90+4'	Stadium: Cashman Field; Attendance: 5,779; Referee: Ismir Pekmic

September 1 28	Fresno FC	1–1	Reno 1868 FC	Fresno, CA
7:00 PM	Ribeiro (yellow card) 60'; Caffa 67', (yellow card) 75'; Barrera (yellow card) 69'	Report	Brown 12'	Stadium: Chukchansi Park; Attendance: 3,579; Referee: Farhad Dadkho

September 9 29	Swope Park Rangers	1–0	Fresno FC	Kansas City, KS
2:00 P.M.	Barry 14', (yellow card) 66'; Bilyeu (yellow card) 29'	Report	Reynish (yellow card) 35'; Cooper (yellow card) 53'; Ellis-Hayden (yellow card) 60'; Caffa (yellow card) 90+1'; Daly (yellow card) 90+3'	Stadium: Children's Mercy Park; Attendance: 961; Referee: Kevin Broadley

September 16 30	Fresno FC	0–1	Orange County SC	Fresno, CA
7:00 PM PDT		Report	Powder (yellow card) 44', (goal) 84'; Duke (yellow card) 49'; Enevoldsen (yellow card) 80'	Stadium: Chukchansi Park; Attendance: 3,056; Referee: Michael Radchuk

September 22 31	Fresno FC	2–2	Portland Timbers 2	Fresno, California
19:00 (PST)	Brown (yellow card) 38'; Baldisimo (yellow card) 54'; Ribeiro (yellow card) 60'; Ellis-Hayden 70'; Chaney 90+5' (Smart) (yellow card) 90+5'	Report	Barmby 8' (pen.) (yellow card) 84'; Loría 11' (pen.); Zambrano (yellow card) 62'	Stadium: Chukchansi Park; Attendance: 6,103; Referee: Luis Guardia

September 29 32	Rio Grande Valley FC	2–1	Fresno FC	Edinburg, Texas
7:30 P.M.	Enríquez 9'; Small 84'	Report	Cazarez 14'; Strong (yellow card) 26'; Johnson (yellow card) 43'	Stadium: H-E-B Park; Attendance: 4,489; Referee: Daniel Gutierrez

October 5 33	Fresno FC	3–0	Colorado Springs Switchbacks FC	Fresno, California
7:00 P.M.	Chaney 23'; Cooper 47'; Johnson (yellow card) 57', (goal) 71'	Report	Eboussi (yellow card) 25'	Stadium: Chukchansi Park; Attendance: 4,682; Referee: Lukasz Szpala

October 13 34	Fresno FC	0–1	Real Monarchs	Fresno, California
7:00 P.M.	Caffa (yellow card) 77'; Del Campo (yellow card) 82'	Report	Adams 37'; Okumu (yellow card) 86'	Stadium: Chukchansi Park; Attendance: 6,248; Referee: Michael Radchuk

=== U.S. Open Cup ===
May 16 Second round	Fresno FC	2–0	Orange County FC	Clovis, CA
7:00 P.M.	Campbell 95'; Bustamante 118'	FRE Report; Report		Stadium: Lamonica Stadium; Attendance: 1,671; Referee: Turan Ozdemir

May 23 Third round	Sporting Arizona FC	1–2 (a.e.t.)	Fresno FC	Mesa, AZ
6:30 P.M.	Flood 66'	FRE Report; Report	Barrera 75'; Bustamante 99'	Stadium: John D. Riggs Stadium; Attendance: 500; Referee: Anthony Bersano

June 6 Fourth round	Los Angeles FC	2–0	Fresno FC	Los Angeles, CA
19:00 P.M.	Rossi 53'; Blessing 56'	Report	Caffa (yellow card) 63'; Cazarez (yellow card) 80'	Stadium: Banc of California Stadium; Attendance: 7,500; Referee: Mark Allatin

== See also ==
- Fresno FC
- 2018 in American soccer
- 2018 USL season
