= Silver State Cup =

- Location: Nevada
- Teams: Las Vegas Lights FC; Reno 1868 FC
- First meeting: 2018
- Next meeting: 2020
- Stadiums: Cashman Field; Greater Nevada Field

Statistics
- Most wins: Reno 1868 FC (2 titles)

The Silver State Cup is a regional soccer competition between the two USL Championship clubs located in the state of Nevada, Las Vegas Lights FC and Reno 1868 FC. Only league matches count in the competition, with a win earning three points and a draw earning one point.

== Match Results ==
=== 2018 ===
March 24, 2018	Las Vegas Lights FC	1–1	Reno 1868 FC	Las Vegas, Nevada
8:00 PM	Huiqui (yellow card) 13'; Garduño (yellow card) 18'; Mendoza 27', (yellow card) 28'; Portugal (yellow card) 31'	Report	Musovski 28', (yellow card) 34' (yellow-red card) 72'; Richards (yellow card) 44'	Stadium: Cashman Field; Attendance: 9,019; Referee: Victor Rivas

August 28, 2018	Reno 1868 FC	2–1	Las Vegas Lights FC	Reno, Nevada
7:30 pm PDT	Brown 5'; Griffiths (yellow card) 70'; Hoppenot 90+5', (yellow card) 90+5'	Report	Alvarez 47'; Herrera-Perla (yellow card) 67'; Avila (yellow card) 87'	Stadium: Greater Nevada Field; Attendance: 5,559; Referee: Elvis Osmanovic

September 22, 2018	Reno 1868 FC	3–3	Las Vegas Lights FC	Reno, Nevada
7:00 pm PDT	Brown 19'; Casiple (yellow card) 47'; Richards (yellow card) 50'; Hoppenot 55'; Griffiths (yellow card) 72'; Mfeka 85'	Report	Huiqui (yellow card) 23'; Mendiola 29', 90'; Alvarez (yellow card) 50'; Ferriño (yellow card) 55'; Íñigo (yellow card) 62'; Guzman 82'; Ochoa (yellow card) 90+5'	Stadium: Greater Nevada Field; Attendance: 6,467; Referee: Michael Radchuk

Reno wins with five points (W–1, D–2, L–0) versus Las Vegas' two points (W–0, D–2, L–1)

=== 2019 ===
June 1, 2019	Reno 1868 FC	4–0	Las Vegas Lights FC	Reno, Nevada
7:30 PM	Partida (yellow card) 23'; Hertzog 41'; Brown 48'; Mendiola (yellow card) 64', (goal) 79'; Lacroix 86'	Report	Cruz (yellow card) 58'; Tabortetaka (yellow card) 76'; Hernández (yellow card) 90'	Stadium: Greater Nevada Field; Attendance: 4,801; Referee: Rosendo Mendoza

October 12, 2019	Las Vegas Lights FC	0–2	Reno 1868 FC	Las Vegas, Nevada
7:30 PM	Villareal (yellow card) 90'	Report	Torre 35' (o.g.); Haji 76'	Stadium: Cashman Field; Attendance: 10,117; Referee: Michael Radchuk

Reno wins with six points (W–2, D–0, L–0) versus Las Vegas' zero points (W–0, D–0, L–2)

=== 2020 ===
On December 20, 2019, the USL announced the 2020 season schedule, creating the following fixture list for the cup competition.

April 4, 2020	Reno 1868 FC	v	Las Vegas Lights FC	Reno, Nevada
6:30 PM				Stadium: Greater Nevada Field

September 26, 2020	Las Vegas Lights FC	v	Reno 1868 FC	Las Vegas, Nevada
7:30 PM				Stadium: Cashman Field
