= 2018 Saint Louis FC season =

Saint Louis FC
2018 season
- Owner: SLSG Pro LLC
- Head coach: Anthony Pulis
- United Soccer League: Western Conference: 6th (current)
- Top goalscorer: League: Cameron Lancaster LOU (21); All: Kyle Greig STL (13)
- Highest home attendance: 6,018 (October 13 vs. OKC Energy)
- Lowest home attendance: 3,127 (August 15 vs. Sacramento Republic FC)
- Average home league attendance: 4,271
| Home colors | Away colors |

The 2018 Saint Louis FC season was the club's fourth season of existence, and their fourth consecutive season in the United Soccer League, the second tier of American soccer. Saint Louis also competed in the U.S. Open Cup. The season covers the period from October 16, 2017, to the beginning of the 2019 USL season.

Saint Louis moved back to the Western Conference this season, after spending 2017 in the Eastern Conference. The team will also have a new head coach this season, with Anthony Pulis coming over from Orlando City B.

== Roster ==
As of May 18, 2018

| No. | Name | Nationality | Position(s) | Date of birth (age) | Signed in | Previous club |
Goalkeepers
| 1 | Tomas Gomez | (United States) | GK | May 20, 1993 (age 32) | 2018 | (United States) Rochester Rhinos |
| 24 | Jake Fenlason | (United States) | GK | February 2, 1993 (age 33) | 2018 | (United States) Orlando City B |
| 28 | Seth Stiebel | (United States) | GK | January 27, 1999 (age 27) | 2018 | (United States) Saint Louis FC U23 |
Defenders
| 2 | Jonathan Barden | (England) | RB, CM, RM | November 9, 1992 (age 33) | 2018 | (Canada) Ottawa Fury FC |
| 3 | Phanuel Kavita | (Democratic Republic of the Congo) | CB, RB | March 9, 1993 (age 32) | 2018 | Puerto Rico FC |
| 4 | Sam Fink | (United States) | CB | May 8, 1993 (age 32) | 2018 | (United States) OKC Energy |
| 5 | Kyle Culbertson | (United States) | LB | November 3, 1992 (age 33) | 2018 | Puerto Rico FC |
| 6 | Austin Ledbetter | (United States) | DF, CM | July 14, 1995 (age 30) | 2017 | (United States) FC Dallas |
| 15 | Sean Reynolds | (United States) | CB | April 11, 1990 (age 35) | 2018 | (United States) Louisville City |
| 18 | Jack Maher | (United States) | DF | October 28, 2000 (age 25) | 2017 | (United States) Saint Louis FC U23 |
| 21 | Aedan Stanley | (United States) | LB | December 13, 1999 (age 26) | 2016 | (United States) St. Louis Scott Gallagher |
Midfielders
| 7 | Joey Calistri | (United States) | AM, LM, RM, CM | November 20, 1993 (age 32) | 2018 | (United States) Chicago Fire |
| 8 | Lewis Hilton | (England) | CM | October 22, 1993 (age 32) | 2018 | (United States) Charlotte Independence |
| 13 | Kadeem Dacres | (United States) | AM, LM, RM | August 25, 1991 (age 34) | 2018 | (United States) FC Cincinnati |
| 17 | Wal Fall | (Germany) | CM | September 8, 1992 (age 33) | 2018 | (United States) Rochester Rhinos |
| 20 | Tony Walls | (United States) | MF, CB | January 16, 1990 (age 36) | 2017 | (United States) Rochester Rhinos |
| 77 | Austin Martz | (United States) | AM, RM | May 31, 1992 (age 33) | 2018 | (United States) Orlando City B |
Forwards
| 10 | Albert Dikwa | (Cameroon) | ST, RM | January 2, 1998 (age 28) | 2018 | (United States) Orlando City B |
| 11 | Corey Hertzog | (United States) | ST, AM | August 1, 1990 (age 35) | 2018 | (United States) Pittsburgh Riverhounds |
| 22 | Kyle Greig | (United States) | ST | February 22, 1990 (age 36) | 2018 | (Canada) Vancouver Whitecaps FC |
Out on loan
| – | Irvin Herrera | (El Salvador) | FW | August 30, 1991 (age 34) | 2016 | (El Salvador) Santa Tecla |

== Competitions ==
=== Preseason ===
Saint Louis revealed their preseason schedule on January 18. They announced six games over a span of about a month, with three coming against collegiate programs, two against an adult amateur club, and one against a fellow professional team. Saint Louis opened preseason with two games in Florida, followed by three games back in Missouri and the finale in Indiana.

| February 14 Friendly | Eastern Florida Titans | 2–8 | Saint Louis FC | Melbourne, FL |
| 6:00 PM CST | Goal | Report | Hertzog 7'; Walls 17'; Fall 25'; Dikwa 30'; Martz 57', 65', 75'; 89' (o.g.) | Stadium: Titan Soccer Complex |

| February 18 Friendly | FIU Panthers | 1–1 | Saint Louis FC | Melbourne, FL |
| 1:00 PM CST | 108' | Report | Volesky 20' | Stadium: Titan Soccer Complex |
Note: Match played with four periods of 30 minutes each

| February 24 Friendly | Saint Louis FC | 7–1 | SIU Edwardsville Cougars | Fenton, MO |
| 2:30 PM CST | Dikwa 4', 40'; Martz 57', 75'; Greig 83'; Trialist 122'; Volesky 147' | Report | Goal Booked | Stadium: Toyota Stadium |
Note: Match played with two periods of 75 minutes each

| March 3 Friendly | Saint Louis FC | 8–0 | FC Denver | Fenton, MO |
| 4:00 PM CST | Hertzog 31', 61', 64', 74'; Greig 45'; Goodwin 80'; Fink 88'; Martz 90' | Report | | Stadium: Toyota Stadium |

| March 4 Friendly | Saint Louis FC | 5–0 | FC Denver | Fenton, MO |
| 11:00 AM CST | 8' (o.g.); Volesky 17'; Calistri 22', 29', 60' | Report | | Stadium: Toyota Stadium |

| March 10 Friendly | Louisville City | 1–1 | Saint Louis FC | Evansville, IN |
| 4:00 PM CST | McCabe 72' | Report | 3' (o.g.) | Stadium: Arad McCutchan Stadium |

=== U.S. Open Cup ===
| May 16 Second Round | Duluth FC | 0–2 | Saint Louis FC | Duluth, MN |
| 7:00 PM CDT | Castro (yellow card) 75' | Report | Dacres 25'; Hertzog 35' | Stadium: Public Schools Stadium; Attendance: 584; Referee: Chris Ruska |

| May 23 Third Round | Louisville City | 1–0 | Saint Louis FC | Louisville, KY |
| 6:00 PM CDT | | | | Stadium: Lynn Stadium |

=== USL ===
==== Standings ====
| Pos | Team | Pld | W | D | L | GF | GA | GD | Pts | Qualification |
|---|---|---|---|---|---|---|---|---|---|---|
| 6 | Portland Timbers 2 | 34 | 17 | 4 | 13 | 58 | 49 | +9 | 55 | Conference Playoffs |
| 7 | Swope Park Rangers | 34 | 15 | 8 | 11 | 52 | 53 | −1 | 53 | Conference Playoffs |
| 8 | Saint Louis FC | 34 | 14 | 11 | 9 | 44 | 38 | +6 | 53 | Conference Playoffs |
| 9 | San Antonio FC | 34 | 14 | 8 | 12 | 45 | 48 | −3 | 50 | |
| 10 | OKC Energy FC | 34 | 12 | 7 | 15 | 43 | 46 | −3 | 43 | |

Source: 2018 USL standings
Rules for classification: 1) total wins; 2) total goal differential; 3) total goals scored; 4) points earned against top four Conference finishers; 5) disciplinary points; 6) coin toss or drawing of lots

==== Results summary ====
| Overall | | | | | | | | Home | | | | | | Away | | | | | |
| Pld | W | D | L | GF | GA | GD | Pts | W | D | L | GF | GA | GD | W | D | L | GF | GA | GD |
|---|---|---|---|---|---|---|---|---|---|---|---|---|---|---|---|---|---|---|---|
| 34 | 14 | 11 | 9 | 44 | 38 | +6 | 53 | 10 | 5 | 2 | 23 | 12 | +11 | 4 | 6 | 7 | 21 | 26 | −5 |

Source: USL standings

==== Results by round ====
| Round | 1 | 2 | 3 | 4 | 5 | 6 | 7 | 8 | 9 | 10 | 11 | 12 | 13 | 14 | 15 | 16 | 17 | 18 | 19 | 20 | 21 | 22 | 23 | 24 | 25 | 26 | 27 | 28 | 29 | 30 | 31 | 32 | 33 | 34 |
|---|---|---|---|---|---|---|---|---|---|---|---|---|---|---|---|---|---|---|---|---|---|---|---|---|---|---|---|---|---|---|---|---|---|---|
| Stadium | A | A | H | H | H | A | A | H | A | A | A | H | H | A | H | A | H | A | H | H | A | H | H | H | A | H | A | A | H | A | A | H | A | H |
| Result | D | L | W | D | W | W | D | D | L | D | L | L | W | W | L | D | D | L | W | D | W | W | W | W | L | W | D | L | W | D | W | W | L | D |

Source: Saint Louis schedule
A = Away; H = Home; W = Win; D = Draw; L = Loss

==== Match results ====
In August 2017, the USL announced that the 2018 season will span 34 games, the longest regular season the league has ever run. The expansion was spurred by the addition of six new clubs for the 2018 season: Atlanta United 2, Fresno FC, Indy Eleven, Las Vegas Lights, Nashville SC, and North Carolina FC.

On January 14, 2018, the league announced home openers for every club. Saint Louis opened the season on the road against Rio Grande Valley FC Toros, opening the 2018 USL season from Edinburg. The club had to wait until March 31 to open up Toyota Stadium, hosting Colorado Springs Switchbacks in their home opener.

The schedule for the remainder of the 2018 season was released on January 19. Saint Louis will play three times against Swope Park Rangers and Tulsa Roughnecks. They will face every other Western Conference team twice.

| March 16 1 | Rio Grande Valley FC Toros | 1–1 | Saint Louis FC | Edinburg, TX |
| 7:30 PM CDT | Donovan (yellow card) 52'; Aguilar (yellow card) 66', (goal) 77' | Report | Hilton (yellow card) 26'; Fall (yellow card) 56'; Walls 82' | Stadium: H-E-B Park; Attendance: 5,910; Referee: Christopher Scruggs |

| March 24 2 | San Antonio FC | 2–1 | Saint Louis FC | San Antonio, TX |
| 7:30 PM CDT | Lopez (yellow card) 4', (goal) 21'; Pecka (yellow card) 27'; Tyrpak 60'; Restrepo (yellow card) 76'; Guadarrama (yellow card) 83' | Report | Greig 2'; Hilton (yellow card) 53' | Stadium: Toyota Field; Attendance: 7,946; Referee: Daniel Radford |

| March 31 3 | Saint Louis FC | 1–0 | Colorado Springs Switchbacks | Fenton, MO |
| 4:00 PM CDT | Greig 5'; Barden (yellow card) 9'; Fink (yellow card) 39' | Report | Kim (yellow card) 11'; Ajeakwa (yellow card) 33' | Stadium: Toyota Stadium; Attendance: 4,034; Referee: Javier Santos |

| April 7 4 | Saint Louis FC | 1–1 | Fresno FC | Fenton, MO |
| 7:30 PM CDT | Hertzog 45+2' (pen.) | Report | Navarro (yellow card) 45+1'; Caffa 47'; Barrera (yellow card) 89'; Ribeiro (yellow card) 90+5' | Stadium: Toyota Stadium; Attendance: 3,683; Referee: Jon Freemon |

| April 14 5 | Saint Louis FC | 1–0 | LA Galaxy II | Fenton, MO |
| 7:30 CDT | Calistri 46' | Report | Büscher (yellow card) 83' | Stadium: Toyota Stadium; Attendance: 4,006; Referee: Don Tebeau |

| April 21 6 | OKC Energy | 0–1 | Saint Louis FC | Oklahoma City, OK |
| 7:00 PM CDT | Guzman (yellow card) 14'; Chavez (yellow card) 45+1', (yellow card) 85' (red card); Ross (yellow card) 81'; Hyland (yellow card) 90' | Report | Volesky 20'; Culbertson (yellow card) 90+4' | Stadium: Taft Stadium; Attendance: 2,679; Referee: Michael Radchuk |

| April 28 7 | Swope Park Rangers | 1–1 | Saint Louis FC | Kansas City, KS |
| 7:30 PM CDT | Barry 3'; Maher (yellow card) 26'; Kuzain (yellow card) 68'; Saravia (yellow card) 86' | Report | Hilton (yellow card) 42'; Calistri (yellow card) 76'; Reynolds (yellow card) 82'; Barden (yellow card) 85'; Greig 88' | Stadium: Children's Mercy Park; Attendance: 900; Referee: Lukasz Szpala |

| May 5 8 | Saint Louis FC | 0–0 | Portland Timbers 2 | Fenton, MO |
| 7:30 PM CDT | Fink (yellow card) 35'; Hertzog (yellow card) 85' | Report | Williamson (yellow card) 45+2'; Batista (yellow card) 61'; Mulligan (yellow card) 65'; Williams (yellow card) 89' | Stadium: Toyota Stadium; Attendance: 4,039; Referee: JJ Bilinski |

| May 9 9 | LA Galaxy II | 6–3 | Saint Louis FC | Carson, CA |
| 9:30 PM CDT | Zubak 14', 70', 90+4'; Alvarez 18', 47', 75'; Appiah (yellow card) 90' | Report | Dacres (yellow card) 32'; Dikwa 39'; Calistri (yellow card) 64'; Greig 67', 87', (yellow card) 78' | Stadium: StubHub Center; Attendance: 858; Referee: Daniel Radford |

| May 12 10 | Orange County SC | 1–1 | Saint Louis FC | Irvine, CA |
| 9:00 PM CDT | Juel-Nielsen (yellow card) 30'; Kavita 78' (o.g.); Enevoldsen (yellow card) 82' | Report | Hilton 82'; Barden (red card) 90+2' | Stadium: Championship Soccer Stadium; Attendance: 3,209; Referee: Adrian Gonzalez |

| May 26 11 | Colorado Springs Switchbacks | 3–0 | Saint Louis FC | Colorado Springs, CO |
| 7:00 PM CDT | Vercollone 32' (pen.), 90+3'; Robinson 61'; Ceus (yellow card) 87' | Report | Stanley (yellow card) 35' | Stadium: Weidner Field; Attendance: 4,417; Referee: Chris Greer |

| May 30 12 | Saint Louis FC | 1–3 | Phoenix Rising FC | Fenton, Missouri |
| 5:30pm | Barden (yellow card) 38'; Rudolph 74' | Report; Report | Cortez 6'; Asante 49'; Musa (yellow card) 58'; Johnson 68' | Stadium: Toyota Stadium; Attendance: 4,318; Referee: Kevin Broadley |

| June 2 13 | Saint Louis FC | 2–0 | Swope Park Rangers | Fenton, Missouri |
| 19:30 (CDT) | Hertzog 26' (pen.); Hilton (yellow card) 43'; Barden (yellow card) 64'; Calistri 77' | Report | Rebellón (yellow card) 42' (yellow-red card) 69'; Silva (yellow card) 45+2' | Stadium: Toyota Stadium; Attendance: 3,450; Referee: Michael Radchuk |

| June 9 14 | Tulsa Roughnecks | 3–0 | Saint Louis FC | Tulsa, OK |
| 7:30 PM CDT | Pírez (yellow card) 22'; Jusino (yellow card) 61' | Report | Greig 17'; Calistri 59', 68' | Stadium: ONEOK Field; Attendance: 2,543; Referee: Ismir Pekmic |

| June 16 15 | Saint Louis FC | 0–1 | Real Monarchs | Fenton, MO |
| 7:30 PM CDT | Kavita (yellow card) 59' | Report | Hoffman 15' (pen.); Horst (yellow card) 25'; Heard (yellow card) 42' | Stadium: Toyota Stadium; Attendance: 5,432; Referee: Daniel Gutierrez |

| June 23 16 | Sacramento Republic | 2–2 | Saint Louis FC | Sacramento, CA |
| 10:00 PM CDT | Iwasa 28', 47'; Vazquez (yellow card) 41'; Hall (yellow card) 84' | Report | Greig (yellow card) 50'; Dikwa 74'; Fall 90' | Stadium: Papa Murphy's Park; Attendance: 10,570; Referee: Elton García |

| June 30 17 | Saint Louis FC | 0–0 | Rio Grande Valley FC Toros | Fenton, MO |
| 7:30 PM CDT | Fink (yellow card) 40'; Reynolds (yellow card) 47'; Culbertson (yellow card) 73'; Hilton (yellow card) 90+4' | Report | Greene (yellow card) 45'; Padilla (yellow card) 85' | Stadium: Toyota Stadium; Attendance: 4,284; Referee: Lukasz Szpala |

| July 7 18 | Las Vegas Lights | 1–0 | Saint Louis FC | Las Vegas, NV |
| 10:00 PM CDT | Avila (yellow card) 20'; Alatorre (yellow card) 36'; Mendiola 49'; Samsyoa (yellow card) 63' | Report | Greig (yellow card) 84' | Stadium: Cashman Field; Attendance: 6,651; Referee: Victor Rivas |

| July 14 | Saint Louis FC | PPD | Tulsa Roughnecks | Fenton, MO |
| 7:30 PM CDT | | | | Stadium: Toyota Stadium |

| July 21 19 | Saint Louis FC | 2–2 | Orange County SC | Fenton, MO |
| 7:30 PM CDT | Greig 70' da Silva 79' | Report | Bjurman 30', (yellow card) 90+1'; Segbers (yellow card) 52'; Alston (yellow card) 55'; Ramos-Godoy 76' | Stadium: Toyota Stadium; Attendance: 3,697; Referee: Malik Badawi |

| July 28 20 | Reno 1868 | 2–1 | Saint Louis FC | Reno, NV |
| 9:30 PM CDT | Calvillo (yellow card) 11' (yellow-red card) 15'; Carroll (yellow card) 13'; Wehan 45+1'; Lacroix (yellow card) 73'; Marcinkowski (yellow card) 89' | Report | Dikwa (yellow card) 14'; Walls (yellow card) 49' da Silva (yellow card) 54'; Fall 74' (pen.); Fink 90+3' | Stadium: Greater Nevada Field; Attendance: 6,680; Referee: Turan Ozdemir |

| August 4 21 | Saint Louis FC | 2–0 | Seattle Sounders FC 2 | Fenton, MO |
| 7:30 PM CDT | Greig 3'; Ledbetter 34'; Da Silva (yellow card) 42' | Report | Ele (yellow card) 21'; Daley (yellow card) 51'; Neagle (yellow card) 70'; Alfaro (yellow card) 90+2' | Stadium: Toyota Stadium; Attendance: 4,134; Referee: Lorant Varga |

| August 11 22 | Saint Louis FC | 4–1 | Las Vegas Lights | Fenton, MO |
| 7:30 PM CDT | Kavita 4'; Dacres 14'; Greig 41'; Cox 88'; Fall (yellow card) 89'; Reynolds (yellow card) 90+3' | Report | Kobayashi (yellow card) 7'; Salgado 19' (pen.); Íñigo (yellow card) 23'; Huiqui (yellow card) 42'; Thomas (yellow card) 62'; Garduño (red card) 70'; Mendiola (yellow card) 71' | Stadium: Toyota Stadium; Attendance: 4,011; Referee: Greg Dopka |

| August 15 23 | Saint Louis FC | 2–1 | Sacramento Republic | Fenton, MO |
| 7:30 PM CDT | Hertzog 5'; Greig 7'; Kavita (yellow card) 62'; Reynolds (yellow card) 69'; Culbertson (yellow card) 90+2' | Report | Villarreal 67'; Taintor (yellow card) 90+1' | Stadium: Toyota Stadium; Attendance: 3,127; Referee: Marcos de Oliveira |

| August 18 24 | Fresno FC | 1–0 | Saint Louis FC | Fresno, CA |
| 9:00 PM CDT | Ellis-Hayden (yellow card) 20', (goal) 33'; Cooper (yellow card) 45' | Report | | Stadium: Chukchansi Park; Attendance: 4,951; Referee: Mark Allatin |

| August 25 25 | Saint Louis FC | 3–2 | Tulsa Roughnecks | Fenton, MO |
| 7:30 PM (CDT | Fall 4', 56' (pen.); Hilton 14' | Report | Ferreira 29', 90+3'; Mirković (yellow card) 67' | Stadium: Toyota Stadium; Attendance: 4,150; Referee: Jon Freemon |

| August 29 26 | Seattle Sounders FC 2 | 1–1 | Saint Louis FC | Tacoma, WA |
| 9:00 PM CDT | Wingo (yellow card) 35'; Burke-Gilroy 37' | Result | Greig 27'; Fall (yellow card) 86' | Stadium: Cheney Stadium; Referee: Daniel Radford |

| September 1 27 | Portland Timbers 2 | 1–0 | Saint Louis FC | Portland, OR |
| 9:00 PM CDT | Ornstil (yellow card) 44'; Diz Pe (yellow card) 68'; Zambrano (yellow card) 78'; Arboleda 90+3' (yellow card) 90+4' | Report | Calistri (yellow card) 41'; Fall (yellow card) 69' | Stadium: Providence Park; Attendance: 1,441; Referee: Michael Radchuk |

| September 8 28 | Saint Louis FC | 1–0 | Reno 1868 | Fenton, MO |
| 7:30 PM CDT | Greig 27', (yellow card) 28'; Culbertson (yellow card) 90+1' | Report | Murrell (yellow card) 19', (yellow card) 53' (red card) | Stadium: Toyota Stadium; Attendance: 4,027; Referee: Victor Rivas |

| September 12 29 | Real Monarchs | 1–1 | Saint Louis FC | Herriman, UT |
| 9:00 PM CDT | Plewa (yellow card) 6'; Hernández 48' | Report | Fall 9'; Calistri (yellow card) 32'; Hilton (yellow card) 81' | Stadium: Zions Bank Stadium; Attendance: 1,180; Referee: Joseph Dickerson |

| September 15 30 | Swope Park Rangers | 3–4 | Saint Louis FC | Kansas City, KS |
| 7:30 PM CDT | Barry 22'; Rebellón (yellow card) 45+3'; Belmar (yellow card) 48'; Blackwood 84'; Vanacore-Decker 90+4' | Report | Cox 37', (yellow card) 41'; Walls 45+5'; Calistri 59', (yellow card) 80'; Greig 82'; Martz (yellow card) 88'; Culbertson (yellow card) 90+3' | Stadium: Children's Mercy Park; Attendance: 1,013; Referee: Rosendo Mendoza |

| September 22 31 | Saint Louis FC | 2–0 | San Antonio FC | Fenton, MO |
| 7:30 PM CDT | Fink (yellow card) 64'; Hilton 79'; Dikwa (yellow card) 90', (goal) 90+3' | Report | King (yellow card) 52'; Cochrane (yellow card) 63'; Elizondo (yellow card) 67'; Hernandez (red card) 87' | Stadium: Toyota Stadium; Attendance: 4,781; Referee: Mark Allatin |

| September 29 32 | Phoenix Rising | 2–0 | Saint Louis FC | Scottsdale, AZ |
| 8:00 PM CDT | Forbes 82'; Cortez 90+2' | Report | | Stadium: Phoenix Rising FC Soccer Complex; Attendance: 6,377; Referee: Farhad Dadkho |

| October 10 33 | Saint Louis FC | 1–0 | Tulsa Roughnecks | Fenton, MO |
| 7:00 PM CDT | Hertzog 14'; Kavita (yellow card) 90+2' | Report | Jusino (yellow card) 73' | Stadium: Toyota Stadium; Attendance: 5,424; Referee: Elton García |

| October 13 34 | Saint Louis FC | 0–0 | OKC Energy | Fenton, MO |
| 7:30 PM CDT | Dikwa (yellow card) 90+3' | Report | Barril (yellow card) 44'; Rasmussen (yellow card) 48' | Stadium: Toyota Stadium; Attendance: 6,018; Referee: Malik Badawi |

==== Postseason ====
| October 20 Conference Quarterfinal | Orange County SC | 4–0 | Saint Louis FC | Irvine, CA |
| 9:00 PM CDT | Seaton 11', 29', 64', (yellow card) 21'; Quinn (yellow card) 47'; Bjurman 66' | Report | Walls (red card) 21'; Hertzog (yellow card) 88' | Stadium: Championship Soccer Stadium; Attendance: 3,360; Referee: Ramy Touchan |

== See also ==
- Saint Louis FC
- 2018 in American soccer
- 2018 USL season
