= Daniel Guzmán =

Daniel Guzmán may refer to:

- Daniel Guzmán (footballer) (born 1965), Mexican footballer and manager
- Daniel Guzmán (actor) (born 1972) Spanish actor and filmmaker
- Daniel Guzmán Jr. (born 1992), Mexican footballer
