= Marco Cesar Jaime Jr. =

Professional footballer (born 1995)

Marco César Jaime Jr.
Personal information
- Full name: Marco César Jaime Jr.
- Date of birth: 20 January 1995 (age 31)
- Place of birth: Las Vegas, Nevada, United States
- Height: 6 ft 0 in (1.83 m)
- Positions: Centre-back; right-back

Youth career
- 2012–2016: Toluca

Senior career*
Years	Team	Apps	(Gls)
2016–2017	Toluca	0	(0)
2017	→ Gavilanes (loan)	16	(1)
2018	Las Vegas Lights	19	(0)
2019–2020	Coras Nayarit	28	(1)

International career
2014	Mexico U20		
- * Club domestic league appearances and goals as of 14 August 2020

Marco César Jaime Jr. (born 20 January 1995) is a former professional football player who played as a defender. Born in the United States, he has previously represented the Mexico national under-20 team.

== Career ==
Jaime Jr. began his career with Toluca, before signing with USL Championship club Las Vegas Lights ahead of their inaugural 2018 season.

== Career statistics ==
As of 14 August 2020

Club	Season	League			Cup (Note: Includes Copa MX and U.S. Open Cup)		Continental		Other		Total	
Club	Season	Division	Apps	Goals	Apps	Goals	Apps	Goals	Apps	Goals	Apps	Goals
Toluca	2016–17	Liga MX	–		1	0	–		–		1	0
Gavilanes (loan)	2017	Liga Premier	16	1	–		–		–		16	1
Las Vegas Lights	2018	USL Championship	19	0	2	0	–		–		21	0
Coras Nayarit	2019–20	Liga Premier	28	1	–		–		–		28	1
Career total			63	2	3	0	0	0	0	0	66	2
