= Zak Drake =

Canadian soccer player (born 1991)

Personal information
- Full name: Zachary Ian Samuel Drake
- Date of birth: September 2, 1991 (age 35)
- Place of birth: Ottawa, Ontario, Canada
- Height: 1.82 m (6 ft 0 in)
- Position: Full-back

Team information
- Current team: Unionville Milliken SC

Youth career
- Nepean City SC
- 2008: Nacional AC (SP)
- 2008–2010: Ottawa Fury

College career
| Years | Team | Apps | (Gls) |
| 2010 | Holy Cross Saints | 17 | (2) |
| 2011–2014 | Bethel Pilots | 45 | (7) |

Senior career*
| Years | Team | Apps | (Gls) |
| 2010–2012 | Ottawa Fury SC | 2 | (0) |
| 2014–2015 | FCA Darmstadt | | |
| 2015–2016 | Viktoria 07 Kelsterbach | 6 | (0) |
| 2015–2016 | Viktoria 07 Kelsterbach II | 2 | (0) |
| 2016 | Olympia Warriors | 9 | (2) |
| 2016 | Northcote City | 7 | (0) |
| 2017 | Viktoria 07 Kelsterbach | 7 | (0) |
| 2017 | FC Maia | | |
| 2018 | Las Vegas Lights | 6 | (0) |
| 2018 | Vaughan Azzurri | 4 | (3) |
| 2019–2021 | Oakville Blue Devils FC | 16 | (0) |
| 2022 | Electric City FC | 18 | (0) |
| 2023–2025 | Alliance United FC | 27 | (0) |
| 2024– | Canadian Crusaders (indoor) | 11 | (7) |
| 2026– | Unionville Milliken SC | 8 | (0) |
- * Club domestic league appearances and goals as of May 31, 2026

Zachary Ian Samuel Drake (born September 2, 1991) is a Canadian soccer player who plays as a full-back for Ontario Premier League club Unionville Milliken SC and Major League Indoor Soccer side Canadian Crusaders.

== Early life ==
Born in Ottawa, Drake played youth soccer with Nepean City SC. In 2008, having impressed on an earlier trip, he went on an extended training months-long training stint with the U17 team of Brazilian club Nacional AC (SP). Afterwards, he joined the Ottawa Fury Academy.

In 2010, he received a scholarship to play at Holy Cross College. After that season, he had a brief training stint with Brazilian club Cruzeiro. In 2011, he transferred to Bethel College. In 2013, he was an NAIA Scholar-Athlete recipient.

== Career ==
In 2010, he began playing with Ottawa Fury SC in the Premier Development League.

In 2014, he joined German club FCA Darmstadt.

In 2015, he joined German club Viktoria 07 Kelsterbach, making six league appearances and 11 total appearances.

In 2016, he joined Australian club Olympia FC Warriors in the NPL Tasmania. He scored his first goal on April 9 against Clarence United, which earned Goal of the Week, Team of the Week, and Player of the Week honours.

In June 2016, he joined another Australian club, Northcote City FC of the NPL Victoria.

Afterwards, he returned to Viktoria 07 Kelsterbach, playing in seven league games.

In 2017, he joined Portuguese club FC Maia.

In January 2018, he joined USL club Las Vegas Lights. He debuted in the season opener, before eventually leaving the club in June.

In the latter part of 2018, he returned to Canada, signing with League1 Ontario club Vaughan Azzurri, scoring two goals in his debut against Ottawa South United. He appeared in four regular season matches, scoring three goals, and also appeared in four playoff matches, winning the League1 Ontario Championship.

In 2019, he joined Oakville Blue Devils FC, playing in 14 regular season matches and four playoff matches, winning the regular season title with the Blue Devils. He returned to the club in 2021 (the 2020 season was cancelled due to the COVID-19 pandemic), playing in two regular season matches and two playoff matches, helping them reach the championship final, where they were defeated, finishing as finalists.

Ahead of the 2022 season, he played in a pre-season friendly with Alliance United FC against York United FC. On March 31, 2022, he signed with Electric City FC.

In 2023, he joined Alliance United FC in League1 Ontario.

In the winter of 2024, he signed with the Canadian Crusaders of Major League Indoor Soccer.
