= Juan José Calderón =

Mexican footballer (born 1991)

Juan Calderón
Personal information
- Full name: Juan José Calderón Enríquez
- Date of birth: February 17, 1991 (age 35)
- Place of birth: Tlajomulco de Zúñiga, Mexico
- Height: 1.64 m (5 ft 4 1/2 in)
- Position: Attacking midfielder

Youth career
- Deportivo Toluca

Senior career*
Years	Team	Apps	(Gls)
2011–2012	Deportivo Toluca	3	(0)
2012–2013	→ León (loan)	3	(0)
2013	→ Pachuca (loan)	0	(0)
2014–2015	→ Linces de Tlaxcala (loan)	15	(2)
2015–2016	Tlaxcala	41	(14)
2016–2017	Venados	21	(2)
2018	Las Vegas Lights	3	(0)
2020	Club Veracruzano de Fútbol Tiburón	0	(0)
- * Club domestic league appearances and goals as of 15:02, 7 April 2018 (UTC)

Juan José Calderón Enríquez (born February 17, 1991), known as Juan Calderón, is a former Mexican professional footballer.
