= Dembakwi Yomba =

Association footballer (born 1996)

Personal information
- Date of birth: September 4, 1996 (age 30)
- Place of birth: Freetown, Sierra Leone
- Height: 1.70 m (5 ft 7 in)
- Position: Forward

Youth career
- 2014–2015: Atlético Madrid

Senior career*
Years	Team	Apps	(Gls)
2015	Atlético Madrid C	0	(0)
2016	Orlando City B	0	(0)
2017–2018	Reno 1868	4	(1)
2017–2018	→ San Jose Earthquakes (loan)	0	(0)
2019	Oakland Roots	4	(0)
2020	Laçi	2	(0)
2022	Sporting Kansas City II	3	(0)

International career
2013	United States U18	8	(0)
2014	United States U20	4	(2)
- * Club domestic league appearances and goals as of 01:04, 28 August 2022 (UTC)

Dembakwi "Boxi" Yomba (born September 4, 1996) is a professional soccer player. Born in Sierra Leone, he has represented the United States at youth level.

== Career ==
Yomba signed with Spanish club Atlético Madrid in 2014, before returning to the United States to join United Soccer League club Orlando City B on January 13, 2016. He failed to make a first-team appearance during his time at Orlando, and was released by the club at the end of the 2016 season.

On March 14, 2017, Yomba signed with United Soccer League club Reno 1868. He scored his first goal for the team against OSA FC on May 17 during the second round of the 2017 U.S. Open Cup. Yomba was one of five Reno players called up by the team's Major League Soccer affiliate, the San Jose Earthquakes, for its July 14 friendly against Eintracht Frankfurt, and he substituted in for Chris Wondolowski in the 33rd minute of the 4–1 victory before being substituted out again in the 63rd minute for Valeri Qazaishvili.

Yomba and Reno mutually parted ways on June 23, 2018.

Yomba joined Oakland Roots on July 5, 2019.

In January 2020, Yomba moved to Albanian Kategoria Superiore side Laçi. He left the club again at the end of the season.

On February 28, 2022, Yomba signed with MLS Next Pro side Sporting Kansas City II.
