= Angel Alvarez (soccer) =

American soccer player (born 1997)

Personal information
- Full name: Angel Octavio Alvarez
- Date of birth: November 16, 1997 (age 28)
- Place of birth: Las Vegas, Nevada, United States
- Height: 5 ft 10 in (1.78 m)
- Position: Goalkeeper

Team information
- Current team: Las Vegas Lights
- Number: 58

Youth career
- 2012–2014: UNAM

College career
Years	Team	Apps	(Gls)
2016	Lakeland Lakers	12	(1)
2017	Laramie County Golden Eagles	12	(0)

Senior career*
Years	Team	Apps	(Gls)
2018–2020	Las Vegas Lights	3	(0)
- * Club domestic league appearances and goals as of May 6, 2021

Angel Octavio Alvarez (born November 15, 1997) is an American soccer player.

== Career ==
=== College ===
Alvarez played two years of college soccer, spending one year at Lakeland Community College before transferring to the Laramie County Community College in 2017.

=== Professional ===
In March 2018, Alvarez signed with USL side Las Vegas Lights FC ahead of their inaugural 2018 season.
