= Juan Carlos García (Mexican footballer) =

Mexican footballer and manager (born 1985)

Personal information
- Full name: Juan Carlos García Álvarez
- Date of birth: 13 March 1985 (age 41)
- Place of birth: Mexico City, Mexico
- Height: 1.86 m (6 ft 1 in)
- Position: Defender

Team information
- Current team: Las Vegas Lights (assistant)

Youth career
- Puebla

Senior career*
Years	Team	Apps	(Gls)
2008–2011	Puebla	11	(0)
2011–2012	Tecos	8	(1)
2012–2013	Mérida	11	(0)
2017	Venados	0	(0)
2018	Las Vegas Lights	13	(2)

Managerial career
- 2020: Las Vegas Legends
- 2023–: Las Vegas Lights (assistant)
- * Club domestic league appearances and goals as of January 26, 2023

Juan Carlos García Álvarez (born March 13, 1985, in Mexico City) is a Mexican football manager and former player. He is currently the manager of Las Vegas Legends.
