= Isaác Díaz =

Mexican footballer (born 1993)

Isaac Díaz
Personal information
- Full name: Isaac Gabriel Díaz Arce
- Date of birth: March 6, 1993 (age 33)
- Place of birth: Guadalajara, Jalisco, Mexico
- Height: 1.73 m (5 ft 8 in)
- Position: Forward

Youth career
- Tecos

Senior career*
Years	Team	Apps	(Gls)
2012–2013	Tecos	9	(1)
2014	Pachuca	0	(0)
2014–2017	Mineros de Zacatecas	5	(0)
2015–2017	→ Loros UdeC (loan)	56	(10)
2018	Las Vegas Lights	4	(0)
2018	Tulsa Roughnecks	14	(1)
2018–2019	La Piedad	5	(2)
2020	Furia Roja	0	(0)
- * Club domestic league appearances and goals as of 17:47, 17 October 2018 (UTC)

Isaac Gabriel Díaz Arce (born March 6, 1993) is a Mexican professional footballer who plays as a forward.
