= Marcelo Alatorre =

Mexican footballer (born 1985)

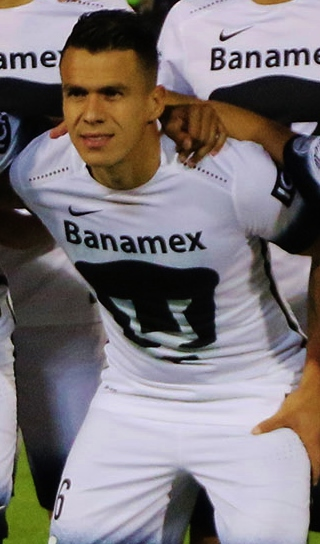

Personal information
- Full name: Marcelo Guadalupe Alatorre Maldonado
- Date of birth: 18 January 1985 (age 41)
- Place of birth: Guadalajara, Jalisco, Mexico
- Height: 1.72 m (5 ft 8 in)
- Position: Defender

Senior career*
Years	Team	Apps	(Gls)
2005–2013	Tecos UAG	123	(0)
2013–2015	UdeG	47	(2)
2015–2016	Pumas UNAM	34	(0)
2017	Veracruz	7	(0)
2017	Venados	11	(0)
2018	Las Vegas Lights	18	(0)
2020	San José	0	(0)
- * Club domestic league appearances and goals as of 12 July 2018

Marcelo Guadalupe Alatorre Maldonado (Note: In this Spanish name, the first or paternal surname is Alatorre and the second or maternal family name is Maldonado.) (born 18 January 1985) is a former Mexican footballer, who last played as defender.
