= Omar Salgado =

American soccer player

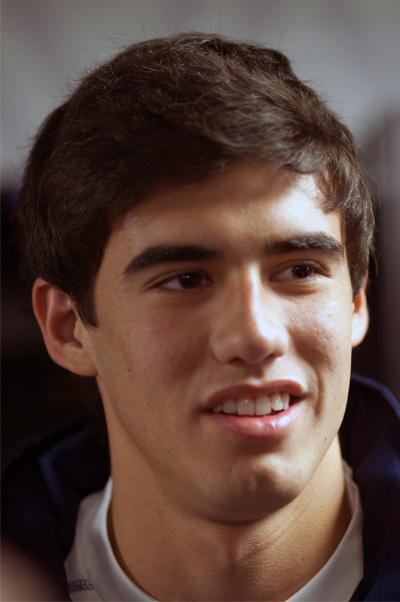
- Salgado in 2011

Personal information
- Full name: Omar Salgado
- Date of birth: September 10, 1993 (age 33)
- Place of birth: El Paso, Texas, United States
- Height: 6 ft 4 in (1.93 m)
- Position: Forward

Youth career
- 2008–2010: Guadalajara

Senior career*
Years	Team	Apps	(Gls)
2011–2014	Vancouver Whitecaps FC	26	(1)
2014	→ Charleston Battery (loan)	5	(2)
2015–2018	Tigres UANL	0	(0)
2015	→ Tampa Bay Rowdies (loan)	1	(0)
2016	→ Jaguares de Córdoba (loan)	5	(0)
2018–2020	El Paso Locomotive	46	(5)
2018	→ Las Vegas Lights (loan)	14	(3)

International career^{‡}
	Mexico U17	5	(7)
	Mexico U20	4	(2)
2011	United States U18	3	(1)
2010–2011	United States U20	14	(1)
2011	United States U23	2	(1)
- * Club domestic league appearances and goals as of October 5, 2020 ‡ National team caps and goals as of August 16, 2014

Omar Salgado (born September 10, 1993) is an American soccer player.

== Career ==
=== Club ===
Salgado began his career at the youth ranks of top Mexican club Guadalajara. Before that, he played for the El Paso Texas Fire Soccer club and attended Cathedral High School He courted controversy when he left the Mexican club side to pursue a career with the United States U-20 national team. He had previously represented Mexico at U-20 and U-17 level.

Salgado signed with Major League Soccer shortly after leaving Chivas and was made eligible for the 2011 MLS SuperDraft. In the meantime, he trained with the Vancouver Whitecaps, Portland Timbers and Everton. He was chosen first overall in the 2011 MLS SuperDraft by Vancouver, and made his professional debut on April 10, 2011, in a game against Houston Dynamo. He scored his first professional goal in his full debut for the Whitecaps on April 30, 2011, against the Columbus Crew.

In September 2011, Salgado received a Spanish passport (by way of a Spanish grandfather), clearing the way for a potential move to Europe.

In June 2012, Salgado fractured his foot while on international duty with the United States U-20 national team in a game against Uruguay. Salgado fractured his foot again in 2013, missing the entire 2013 MLS Season. In the early part of the 2014 season Salgado had a successful loan period with USL club Charleston Battery before being recalled to the Whitecaps first team.

On December 8, 2014, Vancouver traded Salgado to New York City FC on the condition that Vancouver and New York both share the fee of a future transfer of Salgado to an international club, avoiding the 2014 MLS Expansion Draft in the process. Just three weeks later Salgado was purchased by Tigres UANL of Liga MX.

He was loaned to the Tampa Bay Rowdies for a spell in 2015.

In March, 2016 he signed with Colombian side Jaguares de Córdoba.

In June, 2018, he signed with El Paso Locomotive FC, a USL Championship expansion team and was subsequently loaned to Las Vegas Lights FC for the remainder of the 2018 season. He returned to El Paso for the 2019 season.

=== International ===
After previously representing Mexico at the Under-17 and Under-20 level Salgado joined the United States Under-20 national team in 2010. His first success with the United States came when he helped the Under-20 team capture the 2010 Milk Cup.

Salgado was called up again for the 2011 Milk Cup as part of the United States U-18 in July 2011.

Salgado trained with two different English Premier League teams in his early years as a professional. During the 2011–12 season, he had a training stint with Fulham FC. He had also trained with Everton FC during the 2010–11 season.

=== Personal life ===
Born and raised in El Paso, Texas, Salgado is a dual American and Mexican citizen. The striker was born to an American mother named Annalu and a Mexican father with Spanish heritage named Eduardo. He has two younger siblings named Natalia and Dante.

== Honors ==
United States U20

- Milk Cup U-20 Tournament: 2010
