= Matt Thomas (soccer) =

American soccer player (born 1995)

Personal information
- Full name: Matthew Thomas
- Date of birth: December 11, 1995 (age 30)
- Place of birth: Las Vegas, Nevada, United States
- Height: 6 ft 1 in (1.85 m)
- Position: Midfielder

Youth career
- Real Salt Lake AZ

College career
Years	Team	Apps	(Gls)
2014–2017	RMC Battlin' Bears	77	(16)

Senior career*
Years	Team	Apps	(Gls)
2018–2019	Las Vegas Lights	26	(3)
2019	Saint Louis FC	1	(0)
- * Club domestic league appearances and goals as of October 24, 2019

Matthew Thomas (born December 11, 1995) is an American soccer player who most recently played for Saint Louis FC in the USL Championship.

== Career ==
=== Youth and college ===
Thomas played four years of college soccer at Rocky Mountain College between 2014 and 2017, where he made 77 appearances, scoring 16 goals and tallying 10 assists.

=== Professional ===
Thomas signed with his hometown team, the United Soccer League side Las Vegas Lights, ahead of their inaugural 2018 season. In the Lights' first match on March 17 against fellow expansion team Fresno FC, Thomas scored the first league goal in club history, just two minutes into the match. The goal proved to be the difference in Las Vegas' 3–2 win.

On June 25, 2019, Thomas moved to USL side Saint Louis FC.
