= Juan Herrera-Perla =

Salvadoran footballer (born 1994)

Personal information
- Date of birth: October 31, 1994 (age 31)
- Place of birth: San Miguel, El Salvador
- Height: 5 ft 11 in (1.80 m)
- Position: Defender

Youth career
- 2009–2012: FC Dallas

College career
Years	Team	Apps	(Gls)
2014–2017	SAGU Lions	69	(8)

Senior career*
Years	Team	Apps	(Gls)
2018	Las Vegas Lights	19	(0)
- * Club domestic league appearances and goals as of October 16, 2018

Juan Herrera-Perla (born 31 October 1994) is a Salvadoran footballer.

== Career ==
=== College and amateur ===
Herrera-Perla played four years of college soccer at Southwestern Assemblies of God University between 2014 and 2017, where he made 69 appearances, scored 8 goals and tallied 2 assists.

=== Professional ===
On 6 February 2018, Herrera-Perla signed with United Soccer League side Las Vegas Lights FC ahead of their inaugural 2018 season.
