= Ricardo Ferriño =

Mexican footballer (born 1991)

Personal information
- Full name: Ricardo Ferriño Treviño
- Date of birth: August 6, 1991 (age 35)
- Place of birth: Torreón, Coahuila, Mexico
- Height: 1.79 m (5 ft 10 in)
- Position: Goalkeeper

Senior career*
Years	Team	Apps	(Gls)
2013	Real Saltillo		
2013–2014	Alacranes de Durango		
2016–2017	Murciélagos	0	(0)
2017	Venados	7	(0)
2018	Las Vegas Lights	27	(0)
- * Club domestic league appearances and goals as of 4 July 2019

Ricardo Ferriño Treviño (born 6 August 1991) is a former Mexican footballer, who played as goalkeeper for the Las Vegas Lights in their inaugural season in the USL. On November 30, 2018, Las Vegas Lights FC announced that they had declined the option in Ferriño's contract.

Ferriño grew up idolizing Mexican keeper Jorge Campos.
