= Daniel Guzmán Jr. =

Mexican footballer (born 1992)

Personal information
- Full name: Daniel Guzmán Miranda
- Date of birth: 28 June 1992 (age 34)
- Place of birth: Guadalajara, Mexico
- Height: 1.78 m (5 ft 10 in)
- Position: Forward

Senior career*
Years	Team	Apps	(Gls)
2008–2012	Santos Laguna	0	(0)
2011–2012	→ Veracruz (loan)	18	(2)
2012–2013	Leones Negros	4	(0)
2013	Ballenas Galeana	3	(0)
2014	Puebla	0	(0)
2015–2016	Leones Negros	6	(1)
2017	Oaxaca	1	(0)
2017–2018	Suchitepéquez	30	(10)
2018	Las Vegas Lights	12	(1)
2019	Deportivo Chiantla	22	(3)
2019–2020	Guastatoya	17	(4)
2020	Atlético Marte	12	(4)
2021	Nueva Concepción	9	(0)

International career
2009	Mexico U17	2	(0)
- * Club domestic league appearances and goals as of 13 December 2021

Daniel Guzmán Miranda (born 28 June 1992) is a former Mexican professional footballer who played as a forward.

== Club career ==
Guzmán Miranda signed as a youth with Mexican club Santos Laguna and has been on loan for the last five years. He has played with Veracruz FC, Club UDG and Ballenas Galeana, all in the Ascenso MX and will finally play Primera División (first division) after signing with Puebla for the 2014 season.

== Personal life ==
Guzmán Miranda is the son of former Mexican football player Daniel Guzmán who currently is the coach of Leones Negros who play in Ascenso MX.
