= Alex Mendoza (soccer) =

American soccer player

Personal information
- Full name: Alexander Brett Mendoza Knaus
- Date of birth: August 16, 1990 (age 36)
- Place of birth: Harrisburg, Pennsylvania, United States
- Height: 5 ft 7 in (1.70 m)
- Position: Midfielder

Youth career
- Harrisburg City Islanders
- 2009–2011: UNAM Pumas

Senior career*
Years	Team	Apps	(Gls)
2011–2012	Pumas Morelos	2	(0)
2012–2013	Athletic Club Morelos		
2013	Philadelphia Union	0	(0)
2017	Harrisburg Heat (indoor)	6	(0)
2018	Las Vegas Lights	18	(2)
2019–2021	Grand Rapids FC		
- * Club domestic league appearances and goals as of 29 March 2019

Alexander Brett Mendoza Knaus (born August 16, 1990) is an American soccer player.

== Career ==
Mendoza began his career with UNAM Pumas, appearing for their youth and reserve teams. He spent time with Athletic Club Morelos and had a short stint with MLS side Philadelphia Union ahead of their 2013 season.

Mendoza signed with United Soccer League side Las Vegas Lights ahead of their inaugural 2018 season.

On March 29, 2019, it was announced that Mendoza had signed with National Premier Soccer League side Grand Rapids FC for the 2019 NPSL season.
