= Carlos Alvarez (soccer, born 1990) =

American soccer player (born 1990)

Personal information
- Full name: Carlos Alvarez
- Date of birth: November 12, 1990 (age 35)
- Place of birth: Los Angeles, California, United States
- Height: 1.78 m (5 ft 10 in)
- Position: Midfielder

Team information
- Current team: San Diego Surf (youth coach)

Youth career
- 2006–2008: Pateadores
- 2008–2009: Chelsea

College career
Years	Team	Apps	(Gls)
2009–2012	Connecticut Huskies		

Senior career*
Years	Team	Apps	(Gls)
2013–2014	Chivas USA	40	(2)
2014–2015	Colorado Rapids	11	(0)
2015	→ Charlotte Independence (loan)	21	(2)
2016	San Antonio FC	30	(4)
2017	Orange County SC	19	(2)
2018	Las Vegas Lights	29	(7)
2019	Loudoun United	14	(1)
2020	San Diego Loyal	14	(1)
Total		178	(19)
- * Club domestic league appearances and goals

Carlos Alvarez (born November 12, 1990) is an American soccer coach and former professional player who played as a midfielder. He works as a youth coach for San Diego Surf SC.

== Youth and college career ==
Alvarez was born in Los Angeles, California on November 12, 1990. He attended Bishop Mora Salesian High School in Los Angeles, where he played soccer. He then continued to University of Connecticut, where he continued his soccer career. He majored in Spanish.

== Club career ==
=== Major League Soccer ===
Alvarez was selected as the second overall pick in the 2013 MLS SuperDraft by Chivas USA. On March 17, 2013, Alvarez debuted for Chivas USA in Major League Soccer against local-rivals, Los Angeles Galaxy, at the Home Depot Center, in which he came in as a half-time substitute for José Erick Correa, and scored the game-tying goal even though Chivas USA had only 10 men.

On July 1, 2014, Alvarez was traded to Colorado Rapids in exchange for Nathan Sturgis.

=== Lower divisions ===
On February 2, 2016, Alvarez was announced as the first-ever signing by San Antonio FC.

On March 23, 2017, Alvarez was announced as the first-ever signing by Los Angeles FC, but was waived by the club before their inaugural season in 2018.

Alvarez was signed by Loudoun United on July 17, 2019, for the remainder of the 2019 USL season, and scored his only goal for the club on August 9, 2019, in Loudoun's Segra Field opener.

On February 8, 2020, Alvarez joined San Diego Loyal.

== Coaching career ==
Following his retirement from professional football, Alvarez began his coaching career, joining San Diego Surf. Carlos has coached the 2014, 2015, and 2012 youth teams at the Surf under Billy Garton.

== Personal life ==
Born in the United States, Alvarez is of Mexican descent. Alvarez is married to Renae Cuéllar, also a soccer player, who plays for Tijuana and the Mexico women's national team. They have a son, Romeo, who was born in April 2017. Alvarez's brother Efraín is also a professional soccer player for Tijuana
