= Sammy Ochoa =

American soccer player (born 1986)

Personal information
- Full name: Samuel Ochoa Oregel
- Date of birth: September 4, 1986 (age 40)
- Place of birth: Morelia, Michoacán, Mexico
- Height: 1.82 m (6 ft 0 in)
- Position: Forward

Youth career
- 2005–2006: Estudiantes Tecos

Senior career*
Years	Team	Apps	(Gls)
2006–2011	Estudiantes Tecos	29	(2)
2011–2013	Seattle Sounders FC	17	(3)
2013	Lobos BUAP	0	(0)
2014	Wilmington Hammerheads	25	(6)
2015–2016	Tulsa Roughnecks	54	(20)
2017	Sacramento Republic	27	(8)
2018–2019	Las Vegas Lights	41	(10)

International career^{‡}
2005	United States U20	4	(0)
2008	United States U23	2	(1)
- * Club domestic league appearances and goals as of October 25, 2019 ‡ National team caps and goals as of October 10, 2011

Samuel Ochoa Oregel (born September 4, 1986) is an American former professional soccer player.

== Professional career ==
Ochoa began his professional career in the youth ranks of Estudiantes Tecos. He made his debut for Tecos first team during the 2006 season. However, he did not receive significant playing time with the first team.

After spending 5 seasons with Estudiantes Tecos, Ochoa signed with Major League Soccer on August 24, 2011, and was acquired via the MLS allocation process by Seattle Sounders FC on August 26. He made his MLS debut for the Sounders on September 24, 2011, coming on as a substitute for Nate Jaqua in a 3–1 road win over Vancouver Whitecaps FC. He scored his first goal for Seattle on 10/15/2011 v. San Jose Earthquakes in Kasey Keller's final regular season home match helping his club in a 2–1 victory.

== International career ==
Ochoa was part of the United States U-20 squad in the 2005 FIFA World Youth Championship and played in four matches. He also scored one goal against Turkey in a 3–2 loss.

== Career statistics ==
Club performance			League		Cup		League Cup		Continental		Total	
Season	Club	League	Apps	Goals	Apps	Goals	Apps	Goals	Apps	Goals	Apps	Goals
Mexico			League		Cup		League Cup		North America		Total	
2006–2007	Estudiantes Tecos	Mexican Primera División	5	0	0	0	0	0	0	0	5	0
2007–2008	Estudiantes Tecos	Mexican Primera División	1	0	0	0	0	0	0	0	1	0
2008–2009	Estudiantes Tecos	Mexican Primera División	0	0	0	0	0	0	0	0	0	0
2009–2010	Estudiantes Tecos	Mexican Primera División	9	0	1	0	0	0	0	0	10	0
2010–2011	Estudiantes Tecos	Mexican Primera División	14	2	0	0	0	0	0	0	14	2
USA			League		Open Cup		League Cup		North America		Total	
2011	Seattle Sounders FC	Major League Soccer	4	2	0	0	2	0	3	0	9	2
2012	Seattle Sounders FC	Major League Soccer	9	1	4	3	1	0	4	4	18	8
2013	Seattle Sounders FC	Major League Soccer	4	0	1	0	0	0	3	0	8	0
Total	Mexico		29	2	1	0	0	0	0	0	30	2
Total	USA		17	3	5	3	3	0	10	4	35	10
Career total			46	5	6	3	3	0	10	4	65	12

== Personal life ==
Ochoa holds an American passport, and he is also brother of Jesús Ochoa, another footballer, and is related to Lights FC in stadium DJ, DJ Ocho.
