= Julian Portugal =

Mexican footballer (born 1992)

Personal information
- Date of birth: August 26, 1992 (age 34)
- Place of birth: Mexico City, Mexico
- Height: 1.73 m (5 ft 8 in)
- Position: Midfielder

College career
Years	Team	Apps	(Gls)
2011–2014	UNLV Rebels	77	(7)

Senior career*
Years	Team	Apps	(Gls)
2014	Las Vegas Mobsters	10	(1)
2015	Tulsa Roughnecks	9	(0)
2018	Las Vegas Lights	13	(0)

Managerial career
- 2016–2017: Southern Nevada Coyotes (assistant)
- 2020: Las Vegas Lights (assistant)
- 2022–: Faith Lutheran Crusaders (girls' assistant)
- 2023–: Las Vegas Lights (assistant)
- * Club domestic league appearances and goals as of January 26, 2023

Julian Portugal (born August 26, 1992) is a professional Mexican footballer who plays as a midfielder.

== Career ==
=== Early career ===
Portugal played college soccer at the University of Nevada-Las Vegas between 2011 and 2014. He earned first-team all-Western Athletic Conference (WAC) in his final season after recording a goal and six assists in 22 games.

Portugal also appeared for USL PDL club Las Vegas Mobsters in 2014.

=== Professional ===
Portugal signed with United Soccer League club Tulsa Roughnecks in March 2015. He made eight appearances that season, but was not retained for 2016.

On 2018 January 8, Portugal became one of the first five players signed by USL expansion club Las Vegas Lights FC.

=== Coaching ===
Portugal returned to Las Vegas Lights in January 2023 to serve as the club's performance coach.

== Personal life ==
Portugal grew up in Mexico before moving with his family to the U.S. state of Nevada.
