= Rodrigo Íñigo =

Mexican footballer (born 1985)

Rodrigo Iñigo
Personal information
- Full name: Rodrigo Iñigo del Hoyo
- Date of birth: 29 August 1985 (age 41)
- Place of birth: Mexico City, Mexico
- Height: 1.85 m (6 ft 1 in)
- Position: Defender

Senior career*
Years	Team	Apps	(Gls)
2006–2014	Club América	?	(3)
2010	→ Querétaro (loan)	15	(0)
2012–2013	→ Lobos BUAP (loan)	24	(0)
2013	→ Puebla (loan)	1	(0)
2014	→ Estudiantes Tecos (loan)	10	(0)
2015	Mineros de Zacatecas	11	(1)
2015	Cimarrones de Sonora	10	(0)
2016–2017	Venados	23	(2)
2018	Las Vegas Lights	11	(0)
2019	San Roque	12	(1)
2019–2020	El Álamo	5	(0)

Managerial career
- 2021–2022: Tondela (assistant)
- 2022: Johor Darul Ta'zim (assistant)
- 2025: Querétaro Reserves and Academy
- 2025: Querétaro (assistant)
- 2026: Wuhan Three Towns (assistant)
- * Club domestic league appearances and goals

Rodrigo Iñigo del Hoyo (born August 29, 1985) is a Mexican former professional footballer who last played for CD El Álamo.

== Career ==
He made his debut February 10, 2007 against Veracruz. A game which resulted in a 4–2 victory for América. After 3 years at América, Iñigo moved to Querétaro F.C. before moving the back to América the following year. Following his release for América, he joined Championship side Cardiff City on a two-week trial. Shortly after, he went on to return to play in Mexico, and currently is playing in Mineros de Zacatecas.
