= Raúl Mendiola =

Mexican footballer (born 1994)

Personal information
- Date of birth: 18 May 1994 (age 32)
- Place of birth: Ciudad Juárez, Mexico
- Height: 1.73 m (5 ft 8 in)
- Position: Attacking midfielder

Youth career
- 2011–2014: LA Galaxy

Senior career*
Years	Team	Apps	(Gls)
2014–2017	LA Galaxy	13	(0)
2014–2017	LA Galaxy II	69	(6)
2018	Las Vegas Lights	22	(10)
2019	Reno 1868	28	(4)
2020	San Diego Loyal	1	(0)
2020	Las Vegas Lights	10	(2)
2024	Central Valley Fuego	12	(0)
- * Club domestic league appearances and goals as of October 31, 2024

Raúl Mendiola (born May 18, 1994) is a Mexican professional footballer who plays as an attacking midfielder.

== Career ==
Born in Ciudad Juárez, Mexico, Mendiola joined the LA Galaxy Academy in 2011. While at the academy level Mendiola won back-to-back U-16 Development Academy Player of the Year awards after the 2009–10 and 2010–11 seasons, playing for California-based development academy club Arsenal FC.

On February 20, 2014, it was announced that Mendiola was signed as a homegrown player by the Galaxy. He then made his professional debut with the LA Galaxy II, the reserve side of the LA Galaxy, on March 22, 2014, in the side's first ever USL Pro match against the Orange County Blues. His first appearance with the LA Galaxy first team came on May 17, 2014, in a regular season MLS match against the Houston Dynamo.

On May 31, 2018, Mendiola joined United Soccer League side Las Vegas Lights.

Mendiola joined USL Championship side Reno 1868 on December 10, 2018.

On July 23, 2020, Las Vegas Lights Head Coach Frank Yallop announced that Mendiola would reunite with the team for the remainder of the 2020 season.

Mendiola signed with USL Championship side San Diego Loyal in January 2020. He returned to former side Las Vegas Lights on July 23, 2020.

After three years without a professional club, Mendiola returned to the professional ranks signing with USL League One side Central Valley Fuego on February 20, 2024.

== Career statistics ==
As of April 27, 2015

Club	Season	League			League Cup		U.S. Open Cup		CONCACAF		Total	
Club	Season	Division	Apps	Goals	Apps	Goals	Apps	Goals	Apps	Goals	Apps	Goals
LA Galaxy	2014	Major League Soccer	3	0	0	0	0	0	—	—	3	0
LA Galaxy	2015	Major League Soccer	0	0	0	0	3	0	—	—	0	0
LA Galaxy	2016	Major League Soccer	6	0	0	0	3	1	—	—	9	1
LA Galaxy	2017	Major League Soccer	4	0	0	0	2	0	—	—	6	0
Major League Soccer Total			13	0	0	0	8	1	0	0	18	1
LA Galaxy II	2014	USL Pro	20	2	0	0	—	—	—	—	20	2
LA Galaxy II	2015	USL Pro	23	4	—	—	—	—	—	—	23	4
LA Galaxy II	2016	USL Pro	17	2	—	—	—	—	—	—	17	2
LA Galaxy II	2017	USL Pro	13	1	—	—	—	—	—	—	13	1
Las Vegas Lights	2018	USL Pro	22	10	0	0	0	0	—	—	22	10
Reno 1868	2019	USL Championship	29	4	0	0	1	0	—	—	29	4
San Diego Loyal	2020	USL Championship	1	0	0	0	0	0	—	—	0	0
Las Vegas Lights	2020	USL Championship	0	0	0	0	0	0	0	0		
USL Championship Total			125	23	0	0	1	0	0	0	125	23
Career total			28	3	0	0	0	0	0	0	28	3

== Honors ==
LA Galaxy

- MLS Cup: 2014
