= Miguel Garduño =

Mexican footballer (born 1991)

Personal information
- Full name: Miguel Ángel Garduño Pérez
- Date of birth: April 26, 1991 (age 35)
- Place of birth: Mexico City, Mexico
- Height: 1.91 m (6 ft 3 in)
- Position: Defender

Senior career*
Years	Team	Apps	(Gls)
2012–2013	Mérida	6	(0)
2013–2014	Delfines de Coatzacoalcos	20	(0)
2014	Dorados de Sinaloa	1	(0)
2015–2018	Reynosa	14	(0)
2018	Las Vegas Lights	19	(2)
2019	El Farolito	4	(0)
2019	Loudoun United	2	(0)
- * Club domestic league appearances and goals as of 23 October 2019

Miguel Ángel Garduño Pérez (born April 26, 1991), known as Miguel Garduño, is a professional Mexican association football player who last played for Loudoun United FC in the USL Championship.

== Career ==
Miguel joined Loudoun United on September 24, 2019.
