= 2017 USL Cup playoffs =

2017 USL Cup
Tournament details
- Country: United States; Canada
- Teams: 16

Final positions
- Champions: Louisville City FC
- Runners-up: Swope Park Rangers

Tournament statistics
- Matches played: 15
- Goals scored: 32 (2.13 per match)
- Top goal scorer(s): Stefano Bonomo; Brian Ownby (3 goals each)

The 2017 USL Cup playoffs is a postseason tournament following the 2017 United Soccer League regular season, the third since the league rebranded for the 2015 season, and the first as a USSF Division II league. Including USL Pro history, it is the sixth postseason tournament. The tournament will begin on the weekend of October 20 and end on the weekend of November 10.

Sixteen teams (top 8 per conference) will compete in the single elimination tournament. Teams will be seeded one through eight in each conference. The conference semifinal winners will play against each other in the Conference Championship, which will serve as the overall semifinals for the playoff. The Eastern and Western Conference Championship winners will play for the USL Cup. The winner of the playoffs will be crowned league champion.

== USL Conference standings ==
The top 8 teams from each conference advance to the USL playoffs.

Eastern Conference

Pos	Team	Pld	Pts
1	Louisville City FC (C)	32	62
2	Charleston Battery	32	54
3	Tampa Bay Rowdies	32	53
4	Rochester Rhinos	32	53
5	Charlotte Independence	32	48
6	FC Cincinnati	32	46
7	New York Red Bulls II	32	44
8	Bethlehem Steel FC	32	44
9	Orlando City B	32	42
10	Ottawa Fury	32	38
11	Harrisburg City Islanders	32	37
12	Saint Louis FC	32	36
13	Pittsburgh Riverhounds	32	36
14	Richmond Kickers	32	32
15	Toronto FC II	32	25

Source: 2017 USL standings
(C) Champions

Western Conference

Pos	Team	Pld	Pts
1	Real Monarchs (X)	32	67
2	San Antonio FC	32	62
3	Reno 1868 FC	32	59
4	Swope Park Rangers	32	58
5	Phoenix Rising FC	32	58
6	OKC Energy FC	32	49
7	Tulsa Roughnecks	32	46
8	Sacramento Republic	32	46
9	Colorado Springs Switchbacks	32	44
10	Orange County SC	32	43
11	Rio Grande Valley Toros	32	35
12	Seattle Sounders 2	32	31
13	LA Galaxy II	32	29
14	Vancouver Whitecaps 2	32	24
15	Portland Timbers 2	32	15

Source: 2017 USL standings
(X) Regular Season League Champion

== Bracket ==
Conference Quarterfinals
October 20 – Louisville Slugger Field
#1 Louisville City FC	4
#8 Bethlehem Steel FC	0
October 21 – Capelli Sport Stadium
#4 Rochester Rhinos (a.e.t.)	2
#5 Charlotte Independence	1
October 21 – Al Lang Stadium
#3 Tampa Bay Rowdies	3
#6 FC Cincinnati	0
October 21 – MUSC Health Stadium
#2 Charleston Battery	0
#7 New York Red Bulls II	4
October 20 – Rio Tinto Stadium
#1 Real Monarchs	1 (1)
#8 Sacramento Republic FC (p)	1 (3)
October 21 – Swope Soccer Village
#4 Swope Park Rangers (p)	1 (4)
#5 Phoenix Rising FC	1 (2)
October 21 – Greater Nevada Field
#3 Reno 1868 FC	0
#6 OKC Energy FC	1
October 21 – Toyota Field
#2 San Antonio FC	2
#7 Tulsa Roughnecks	1

Conference Semifinals
October 28 – Louisville Slugger Field
#1 Louisville City FC	1
#4 Rochester Rhinos	0
October 28 – Al Lang Stadium
#3 Tampa Bay Rowdies	1
#7 New York Red Bulls II (a.e.t.)	2
October 28 – Children's Mercy Park
#8 Sacramento Republic FC	0
#4 Swope Park Rangers	1
October 28 – Toyota Field
#6 OKC Energy FC (p)	1 (4)
#2 San Antonio FC	1 (1)

Conference Finals
November 4 – Louisville Slugger Field
#1 Louisville City FC (p)	1 (4)
#7 New York Red Bulls II	1 (3)
November 4 – Children's Mercy Park
#4 Swope Park Rangers (p)	0 (7)
#6 OKC Energy FC	0 (6)

USL Championship
November 13 – Louisville Slugger Field (ESPNU)
#1 Louisville City FC	1
#4 Swope Park Rangers	0

== Schedule ==
=== Conference Quarterfinals ===
October 20, 2017 East	Louisville City FC	4–0	Bethlehem Steel FC	Louisville, Kentucky
7:30 pm EDT	Morad 14', 31'; Spencer 70'; Ownby 79'	Report	Real (yellow card) 57'; Burke (yellow card) 63'; Conneh (yellow card) 75'; Jones (yellow card) 87'	Stadium: Louisville Slugger Field; Attendance: 6,378; Referee: Marcos de Oliveira

October 21, 2017 East	Rochester Rhinos	2–1 (a.e.t.)	Charlotte Independence	Rochester, New York
6:05 pm EDT	Dover (yellow card) 11'; Graf 53'; François (yellow card) 61'; Farrell (yellow card) 83'; Defregger 113'	Report	A. Martínez (yellow card) 53' (yellow-red card) 120'; E. Martínez 69'; Davidson (yellow card) 85'	Stadium: Capelli Sport Stadium; Attendance: 1,647; Referee: Bardhyl Pashaj

October 21, 2017 East	Tampa Bay Rowdies	3–0	FC Cincinnati	St. Petersburg, Florida
7:30 pm EDT	Schäfer 8', 25'; Hristov (yellow card) 61' (goal) 67'; Cole (yellow card) 84'	Report	McLaughlin (yellow card) 52'; Walker (yellow card) 63'; Berry (yellow card) 90'	Stadium: Al Lang Stadium; Attendance: 6,104; Referee: Malik Badawi

October 21, 2017 East	Charleston Battery	0–4	New York Red Bulls II	Charleston, South Carolina
7:00 pm EDT	Anunga (yellow card) 57'; Griffith (yellow card) 85'	Report	Bonomo 39'; Kutler 51'; Valot 71'; Flemmings (yellow card) 82'; Mines 84'	Stadium: MUSC Health Stadium; Attendance: 3,410; Referee: Kevin Broadley

October 20, 2017 West	Real Monarchs	1–1 (a.e.t.) (1–3 p)	Sacramento Republic FC	Sandy, Utah
8:00 pm MDT	Besler (yellow card) 38'; Lachowecki (yellow card) 82'; Hoffman 86' (pen.)	Report	Kiffe (yellow card) 20'; Espino 49'	Stadium: Rio Tinto Stadium; Attendance: 2,234; Referee: Ramy Touchan
	Penalties
	Cruz (penalty missed); Velásquez (penalty missed); Haber (penalty scored); Hoffman (penalty missed)		(penalty scored) Partain; (penalty scored) Kiffe; (penalty scored) Hall

October 22, 2017 West	Swope Park Rangers	1–1 (a.e.t.) (4–2 p)	Phoenix Rising FC	Kansas City, Missouri
3:00 pm CDT	Didic 109'	Report	Drogba 99'	Stadium: Children's Mercy Victory Field; Attendance: 912; Referee: Guido Gonzales Jr.
	Penalties
	Selbol (penalty scored); Duke (penalty scored); Belmar (penalty scored); Moloto (penalty scored)		(penalty missed) Lambert; (penalty scored) Dia; (penalty scored) Awako; (penalty missed) Mala
Note: Match was postponed due to lightning and heavy rain after the first half, Second half was played the following day.

October 21, 2017 West	Reno 1868 FC	0–1	OKC Energy FC	Reno, Nevada
5:45 pm PDT	Wehan (yellow card) 32'	Report	Wojcik 41', (yellow card) 90+1'	Stadium: Greater Nevada Field; Attendance: 4,342; Referee: Victor Rivas

October 21, 2017 West	San Antonio FC	2–1	Tulsa Roughnecks	San Antonio, Texas
7:30 pm CDT	McCarthy (yellow card) 55'; Elizondo 61'; Guzmán 90+4' (pen.)	Report	Gee 23'; Ayala (yellow card) 53'; Levin (yellow card) 90+2'; Rivas (yellow card) 90+2'	Stadium: Toyota Field; Attendance: 7,019; Referee: Tim Ford

=== Conference Semifinals ===
October 28, 2017 East	Louisville City FC	1–0	Rochester Rhinos	Louisville, Kentucky
7:30 pm EDT	Jimenez (yellow card) 52'; Ownby 77'; Ranjitsingh (yellow card) 90+1'	Report	Felix (yellow card) 55'	Stadium: Louisville Slugger Field; Attendance: 7,117; Referee: Victor Rivas

October 28, 2017 East	Tampa Bay Rowdies	1–2 (a.e.t.)	New York Red Bulls II	St. Petersburg, Florida
7:30 pm EDT	Hristov 26'; Portillos (yellow card) 35'; Guenzatti (yellow card) 39'; Cole (yellow card) 42'; Pickens (yellow card) 57'; Vingaard (yellow card) 62'; Restrepo (yellow card) 66'; Paterson (yellow card) 116'	Report	Bonomo 58' (pen.), 93'; Flemmings (yellow card) 86'; Ndam (yellow card) 96'	Stadium: Al Lang Stadium; Attendance: 5,119; Referee: Joe Dickerson

October 28, 2017 West	Swope Park Rangers	1–0	Sacramento Republic FC	Kansas City, Kansas
4:00 pm CDT	Maher (yellow card) 39'; Belmar 46'	Report	Kiffe (yellow card) 41'; Ochoa (yellow card) 67'	Stadium: Children's Mercy Park; Attendance: 1,248; Referee: Ramy Touchan
Note: Match was moved to Papa Murphy's Park due to challenges at Children's Mercy Victory Field. Then it was switched again to Children's Mercy Park.

October 28, 2017 West	San Antonio FC	1–1 (a.e.t.) (1–4 p)	OKC Energy FC	San Antonio, Texas
7:30 pm CDT	Elizondo 7' (yellow card) 97'; Gordon (yellow card) 51'; Castillo (yellow card) 112'	Report	R. Dixon (yellow card) 72'; Wojcik 85'	Stadium: Toyota Field; Attendance: 7,032; Referee: Guido Gonzales Jr.
	Penalties
	Guzmán (penalty missed); Castillo (penalty scored); Reed (penalty missed)		(penalty scored) Angulo; (penalty scored) Brown; (penalty scored) Hyland; (penalty scored) Wallace

=== Conference Finals ===
November 4, 2017 East	Louisville City FC	1–1 (a.e.t.) (4–3 p)	New York Red Bulls II	Louisville, Kentucky
7:30 pm EDT	Ownby 12'; Craig (yellow card) 96'	Report	Flemmings 57'	Stadium: Louisville Slugger Field; Attendance: 10,047; Referee: Sorin Stoica
	Penalties
	Smith (penalty scored); DelPiccolo (penalty missed); Totsch (penalty scored); Jimenez (penalty scored); Ballard (penalty scored)		(penalty scored) Bonomo; (penalty scored) Martínez; (penalty scored) Valot; (penalty missed) Mines; (penalty missed) Kutler

November 4, 2017 West	Swope Park Rangers	0–0 (a.e.t.) (7–6 p)	OKC Energy FC	Kansas City, Kansas
7:30 pm CDT	Didic (yellow card) 53'	Report	Barril (yellow card) 79'; Daly (yellow card) 90+3'; Wojcik (yellow card) 113'	Stadium: Children's Mercy Park; Attendance: 3,012; Referee: Robert Sibiga
	Penalties
	Selbol (penalty scored); Duke (penalty missed); Belmar (penalty scored); Moloto (penalty missed); Hernandez (penalty missed); Barnathan (penalty scored); Storm (penalty scored); Musa (penalty scored); Didic (penalty missed); Maher (penalty scored); Zendejas (penalty scored)		(penalty missed) Angulo; (penalty scored) Brown; (penalty missed) Hyland; (penalty missed) Wallace; (penalty scored) M. González; (penalty scored) D. Gonzalez; (penalty scored) Daly; (penalty scored) Wojcik; (penalty missed) Bond; (penalty scored) Fink; (penalty missed) Cochran

=== USL Championship ===
November 13, 2017 Final	Louisville City FC	1–0	Swope Park Rangers	Louisville, Kentucky
9:00 PM EST	Lancaster 88'; Kaye (yellow card) 90+3'; McCabe (red card) 90+8'	Report; Report	Musa (yellow card) 17'; Didic (yellow card) 24'	Stadium: Louisville Slugger Field; Attendance: 14,456; Referee: Jose Carlos Rivero
Note: Niall McCabe was sent off from the bench

Championship Game MVP: Paolo DelPiccolo (LOU)

== Top goalscorers ==
Rank	Player	Club	Goals
1	(California) Stefano Bonomo	New York Red Bulls II	3
1	(Virginia) Brian Ownby	Louisville City FC	3
3	(Costa Rica) César Elizondo	San Antonio FC	2
3	(Bulgaria) Georgi Hristov	Tampa Bay Rowdies	2
3	(California) Tarek Morad	Louisville City FC	2
3	(Germany) Marcel Schäfer	Tampa Bay Rowdies	2
3	(Poland) Wojciech Wojcik	Oklahoma City Energy	2
8	(Virginia) Kharlton Belmar	Swope Park Rangers	1
8	(New Hampshire) Stefan Defregger	Rochester Rhinos	1
8	(Canada) Amer Didic	Swope Park Rangers	1
8	(Ivory Coast) Didier Drogba	Phoenix Rising FC	1
8	(Mexico) Luis Espino	Sacramento Republic FC	1
8	(Jamaica) Junior Flemmings	New York Red Bulls II	1
8	(Canada) Paris Gee	Tulsa Roughnecks FC	1
8	(Texas) Jochen Graf	Rochester Rhinos	1
8	(Mexico) Éver Guzmán	San Antonio FC	1
8	(Alabama) Chandler Hoffman	Real Monarchs	1
8	(New York (state)) Ethan Kutler	New York Red Bulls II	1
8	(England) Cameron Lancaster	Louisville City FC	1
8	(Uruguay) Enzo Martínez	Charlotte Independence	1
8	(Connecticut) Ben Mines	New York Red Bulls II	1
8	(Bavaria) (Ohio) Luke Spencer	Louisville City FC	1
8	(France) Florian Valot	New York Red Bulls II	1
