= 2017 Swope Park Rangers season =

Swope Park Rangers
2017 season
- General manager: Kurt Austin
- Head coach: Nikola Popovic
- Stadium: Swope Soccer Village
- USL: Conference: 4th
- USL Playoffs: Championship final
- Top goalscorer: Kharlton Belmar (15)
- Highest home attendance: 3,012 (11/4 vs. OKC)
- Lowest home attendance: 572 (3/29 vs. POR)
- Average home league attendance: 1,015
- Biggest win: SPR 4–0 RGV (7/18)
- Biggest defeat: SPR 1–4 RNO (7/30); OKC 4–1 SPR (10/8)
Home colors	Away colors

The 2017 Swope Park Rangers season was the club's 2nd year of play, along with their second season in the Western Conference of the United Soccer League, the second tier of the United States Soccer Pyramid. For the 2nd straight year the Swope Park Rangers finished fourth in the Western Conference and were runners-up in the USL Championship; they lost 1–0 to Louisville City FC in the final.

== USL Regular season ==
=== Standings ===
Pos	Team	Pld	W	D	L	GF	GA	GD	Pts	Qualification
2	San Antonio FC	32	17	11	4	45	24	+21	62	Conference Playoffs
3	Reno 1868 FC	32	17	8	7	75	39	+36	59	Conference Playoffs
4	Swope Park Rangers	32	17	7	8	55	37	+18	58	Conference Playoffs
5	Phoenix Rising FC	32	17	7	8	50	37	+13	58	Conference Playoffs
6	OKC Energy FC	32	14	7	11	46	41	+5	49	Conference Playoffs

Source: 2017 USL standings
Rules for classification: 1) total wins; 2) total goal differential; 3) total goals scored; 4) points earned against top four Conference finishers; 5) disciplinary points; 6) coin toss or drawing of lots

=== Matches ===
Win Draw Loss Upcoming fixture

March 25, 2017 USL 1	Swope Park Rangers	3–1	OKC Energy FC	Kansas City, Missouri
19:30 (CDT)	Kharlton Belmar 42'; Felipe Hernandez (yellow card) 47+'; Latif Blessing 62'; Dániel Sallói 71'	Report	Codi Laurendi (yellow card) 15'; Coady Andrews 24'; Philip Rasussen (yellow card) 47'; Jose Barril (yellow card) 90+1' (yellow-red card) 90+4'	Stadium: Children's Mercy Victory Field; Attendance: 1,060; Referee: Jon Freemon

March 29, 2017 USL 2	Swope Park Rangers	1–0	Portland Timbers 2	Kansas City, Missouri
19:30 (CDT)	Kharlton Belmar 15' (yellow card) 54'; Lebo Moloto (yellow card) 29'; Nansel Selbol (yellow card) 58'; Adrian Zendejas (yellow card) 90+3'	Report	Shaquille Jimenez (yellow card) 22'; Rennico Clarke (yellow card) 73'	Stadium: Children's Mercy Victory Field; Attendance: 572; Referee: Nima Saghafi

April 15, 2017 USL 3	Swope Park Rangers	1–0	Sacramento Republic FC	Kansas City, Missouri
19:00 (CDT)	Kevin Oliveira (yellow card) 52'; Amer Didic (yellow card) 57'; Mark Anthony Gonzalez 70'	Report		Stadium: Children's Mercy Victory Field; Attendance: 1,002; Referee: Dule Djurasevic

April 23, 2017 USL 4	Phoenix Rising FC	4–3	Swope Park Rangers	Phoenix, Arizona
19:00 (CDT)	Alessando Riggi 22'; Luke Rooney 25'; Chris Cortez 27'; Peter Ramage 47'; Kody Wakasa (red card); Shaun Wright-Phillips (yellow card) 90+5'	Report	David Greczek (yellow card) 24'; Kevin Oliveira 79' (pen.), 90'; Christian Duke 90+3'	Stadium: Phoenix Rising Soccer Complex; Attendance: 7,162; Referee: Luis Guardia

April 29, 2017 USL 5	Real Monarchs SLC	2–1	Swope Park Rangers	Sandy, Utah
17:00 (CDT)	Chandler Hoffman 19'; Sebastian Velasquez (yellow card) 23'; James Moberg 36'; Ricardo Velazco (yellow card) 84'	Report	James Musa (yellow card) 7'; Amer Didic (yellow card) 14'; Kevin Oliveira (yellow card) 45+1'; Kharlton Belmar 48' (yellow card) 49'; Christian Duke (yellow card) 82'	Stadium: Rio Tinto Stadium; Referee: Edvin Jurisevic

May 5, 2017 USL 6	Swope Park Rangers	3–1	Vancouver Whitecaps FC 2	Kansas City, Missouri
19:30 (CDT)	Nansel Selbol 8'; Lebo Moloto 28'; Kharlton Belmar 38'; Colton Storm (yellow card) 57'; Robert Mirosavic (yellow card) 80'; James Musa (yellow card) 86'	Report	David Norman (yellow card) 37'; Ben McKendry 86' (pen.) (yellow card) 90+3'	Stadium: Children's Mercy Victory Field; Attendance: 1,110; Referee: Calin Radosav

May 13, 2017 USL 7	Rio Grande Valley FC	1–0	Swope Park Rangers	Edinburg, Texas
19:30 (CDT)	Todd Wharton 18'; Eric Bird (yellow card) 84'; Kai Greene (yellow card) 90+1'	Report	James Musa (yellow card) 84'; Liam Doyle (yellow card) 90'	Stadium: H-E-B Park; Referee: Marco Vega

May 26, 2017 USL 8	Swope Park Rangers	0–1	San Antonio FC	Kansas City, Missouri
19:30 (CDT)	Billy Forbes (yellow card) 61'; Mark O'Ojong 53' (yellow card) 79'; Kris Tyrpak (yellow card) 90+3'	Report	James Musa (yellow card) 24'	Stadium: Children's Mercy Victory Field; Attendance: 921; Referee: Jose Lara

June 3, 2017 USL 9	San Antonio FC	0–0	Swope Park Rangers	San Antonio, Texas
19:30 (CDT)	Greg Cochrane (yellow card) 82'	Report	Liam Doyle (yellow card) 26'; James Musa (yellow card) 70'	Stadium: Toyota Field; Referee: Henrik Karlsson

June 11, 2017 USL 10	Swope Park Rangers	3–1	Tulsa Roughnecks FC	Kansas City, Missouri
16:00 (CDT)	Kharlton Belmar (yellow card) 21'; Cameron Iwasa 56'; Mark Anthony Gonzalez 90+1' (pen.), 90+3'	Report	Francisco Ugarte (yellow card) 11'; Oumar Ballo 75' (og.); Pavel Kondrakhin (yellow card) 87'	Stadium: Children's Mercy Victory Field; Attendance: 789; Referee: Jon Freemon

June 18, 2017 USL 11	Swope Park Rangers	2–2	Phoenix Rising FC	Kansas City, Missouri
16:00 (CDT)	Liam Doyle (yellow card) 9'; Kevin Oliveira 26' (pen.); Nansel Selbol 62' (pen.); Christian Duke (yellow card) 72'	Report	J. J. Greer (yellow card) 25'; Didier Drogba 57', 89' (pen.) (yellow card) 86'	Stadium: Children's Mercy Victory Field; Attendance: 1,405; Referee: Katja Koroleva

June 21, 2017 USL 12	Swope Park Rangers	2–1	Colorado Springs Switchbacks FC	Kansas City, Missouri
19:30 (CDT)	Liam Doyle 67'; Christian Duke 75'; James Musa (yellow card) 78'; Kharlton Belmar (yellow card) 90+1'	Report	Eddy Prugh 23'; Moise Pouaty (yellow card) 90'	Stadium: Children's Mercy Victory Field; Attendance: 914; Referee: Ismir Pekmic

June 27, 2017 USL 13	Tulsa Roughnecks FC	1–2	Swope Park Rangers	Tulsa, Oklahoma
19:30 (CDT)	Francisco Ugarte (yellow card) 34'; Jorge Luis Corrales (yellow card) 58'; Collin Fernandez 69'	Report	Lebo Moloto (yellow card) 16'; Diego Rubio 27'; Mark Anthony Gonzalez 63'; Adrian Zendejas (yellow card) 90+2'	Stadium: ONEOK Field; Referee: Luis Guardia

June 30, 2017 USL 14	LA Galaxy II	0–1	Swope Park Rangers	Carson, California
21:30 (CDT)	Alejandro Covarrubias (yellow card) 43'; Tyler Turner (yellow card) 59'; Ryo Fujii (yellow card) 77'	Report	Cameron Iwasa (yellow card) 45'; Nansel Selbol 63'; Mark Anthony Gonzalez (yellow card) 85'; Tyler Pasher (yellow card) 87'	Stadium: StubHub Center; Referee: Kevin Stott

July 8, 2017 USL 15	Swope Park Rangers	4–0	Rio Grande Valley FC	Kansas City, Missouri
19:30 (CDT)	Nansel Selbol (yellow card) 33'; Lebo Moloto 39'; Mark Anthony Gonzalez 45+3'; Colton Storm 49'; Cameron Iwasa 84'; Parker Maher (yellow card) 89'	Report	Todd Wharton (yellow card) 58'; Ruben Luna (yellow card) 82'	Stadium: Children's Mercy Victory Field; Attendance: 1,546

July 12, 2017 USL 16	Vancouver Whitecaps FC 2	0–1	Swope Park Rangers	Langley, Canada
14:00 (CDT)	Deklan Wynne (yellow card) 64'; Ben McKendry (yellow card) 73'	Report	Kharlton Belmar 65'; Liam Doyle (yellow card) 84'	Stadium: McLeod Athletic Park

July 16, 2017 USL 17	Portland Timbers 2	0–1	Swope Park Rangers	Portland, Oregon
16:00 (CDT)	Kyle Bjornethun (yellow card) 35'	Report	Kharlton Belmar 61'	Stadium: Providence Park

July 20, 2017 USL 18	Seattle Sounders FC 2	0–2	Swope Park Rangers	Tukwila, Washington
21:30 (CDT)	Charles Renken (yellow card) 36'	Report	James Musa (yellow card) 31'; Lebo Moloto 47'; Colton Storm (yellow card) 61'; Nansel Selbol 83'	Stadium: Starfire Sports Complex; Attendance: 951; Referee: Katja Koroleva

July 30, 2017 USL 19	Swope Park Rangers	1–4	Reno 1868 FC	Kansas City, Missouri
16:00 (CDT)	Felipe Hernandez 60'; Christian Duke (yellow card) 68'	Report	Antoine Hoppenot 1'; Luis Felipe Fernandes 45'; Matt Bersano (yellow card) 45+1'; Lindo Mfeka (yellow card) 64'; Jordan Murrell (yellow card) 66'; Dane Kelly 76' (yellow card) 34'; Seth Casiple 90'	Stadium: Children's Mercy Victory Field; Attendance: 989; Referee: Alejandro Mariscal

August 5, 2017 USL 20	Saint Louis FC	0–0	Swope Park Rangers	Fenton, Missouri
19:30 (CDT)	Ivan Mirkovic (yellow card) 27'; Matthew Sheldon (yellow card) 57'; Konrad Plewa (yellow card) 90+4'	Report	Amer Didic (yellow card) 56'; Darrin MacLeod (yellow card) 63'	Stadium: Toyota Stadium; Attendance: 4,433; Referee: Ismir Pekmic

August 12, 2017 USL 21	Swope Park Rangers	1–1	Orange County SC	Kansas City, Missouri
19:30 (CDT)	Kharlton Belmar 4'; Lebo Moloto (yellow card) 36'	Report	Zach Kobayashi 51' (yellow card) 86'; Richard Chaplow (yellow card) 71'	Stadium: Children's Mercy Victory Field; Attendance: 1,012

August 18, 2017 USL 22	Swope Park Rangers	2–2	Real Monarchs SLC	Kansas City, Missouri
19:30 (CDT)	Nansel Selbol 60'; Lebo Moloto (yellow card) 67'; Kharlton Belmar 82'	Report	Daniel Haber 8'; Kyle Curinga 26' (yellow card) 88'	Stadium: Children's Mercy Victory Field; Attendance: 936; Referee: Malik Badawi

August 23, 2017 USL 23	Sacramento Republic FC	2–2	Swope Park Rangers	Sacramento, California
22:00 (CDT)	James Kiffe (yellow card) 34'; Wilson Kneeshaw 36'; Tyler Blackwood 88'	Report	Soony Saad 4'; Lebo Moloto (yellow card) 45'; Kharlton Belmar 68'	Stadium: Papa Murphy's Park

August 26, 2017 USL 24	Reno 1868 FC	1–0	Swope Park Rangers	Reno, Nevada
21:30 (CDT)	Antoine Hoppenot 10' (pen.); Jimmy Ockford (yellow card) 58'; Brenton Griffiths (red card) 87'; Luis Felipe Fernandes (yellow card) 90+4'	Team Report; Soccerway Rpt	Adrian Zendejas (yellow card) 18'; Amer Didic (yellow card) 68'; Oumar Ballo (yellow card) 86'; Wan Kuzain (yellow card) 90+2'; Soony Saad (red card) 90+4'	Stadium: Greater Nevada Field; Referee: Robi Hullner

September 9, 2017 USL 25	Swope Park Rangers	2–0	OKC Energy FC	Kansas City, Missouri
19:30 (CDT)	Lebo Moloto 19' (pen.), 49' (yellow card) 73'; Colton Storm (yellow card) 63'; Kharlton Belmar (yellow card) 90+1'	Report	Michael Daly (yellow card) 26'	Stadium: Children's Mercy Victory Field; Attendance: 1,073; Referee: Bardhyl Pashaj

September 9, 2017 USL 26	Orange County SC	2–1	Swope Park Rangers	Irvine, California
21:00 (CDT)	Jerry van Ewijk 43' (pen.); Irvin Parra 65'; Gustavo Villalobos (yellow card) 89'	Report	Liam Doyle (yellow card) 34'; Kharlton Belmar 46'; Nansel Selbol (yellow card) 84'	Stadium: Championship Soccer Stadium; Attendance: 1,114; Referee: Farhad Dakho

September 17, 2017 USL 27	Swope Park Rangers	5–2	San Antonio FC	Kansas City, Missouri
16:00 (CDT)	Nansel Selbol 11' (pen.), 62'; Felipe Hernandez 45+1'; Kharlton Belmar 65'; Mark Anthony Gonzalez (yellow card) 72'; Max Rugova 80'	Report	Ben Newnam (yellow card) 13'; Omar Gordon 20'; Pecka (yellow card) 45'; Billy Forbes 85'	Stadium: Children's Mercy Victory Field; Attendance: 1,114; Referee: Farhad Dakho

September 23, 2017 USL 28	Colorado Springs Switchbacks FC	1–3	Swope Park Rangers	Colorado Springs, Colorado
19:00 (CDT)	Josh Phillips (yellow card) 12'; Shawn Chin (yellow card) 15'; Pascal Eboussi 90+2'; Rony Argueta (yellow card) 90+5'	Report	Oumar Ballo 20' (yellow card) 1'; Kharlton Belmar 20'; Nansel Selbol 22'	Stadium: Weidner Field

September 27, 2017 USL 29	Swope Park Rangers	3–0	LA Galaxy II	Kansas City, Missouri
19:30 (CDT)	Kharlton Belmar 37'; Lebo Moloto 53'; Amer Didic 58'; Nansel Selbol (yellow card) 69'	Report	Andre Ulrich Zanga (yellow card) 55'; Jonathan Hernandez (yellow card) 67'; Jorge Hernandez (yellow card) 73'; Adrian Vera (yellow card) 83'	Stadium: Children's Mercy Victory Field; Attendance: 857; Referee: Gustavo Solorio

September 30, 2017 USL 30	Rio Grande Valley FC	2–2	Swope Park Rangers	Edinburg, Texas
19:30 (CDT)	Joseph Holland 7'; Kyle Murphy 64' (yellow card) 12'	Report	own goal 75' (o.g.); Christian Duke (yellow card) 87'; Kharlton Belmar 90+1'	Stadium: H-E-B Park; Referee: Mark Allatin

October 8, 2017 USL 31	OKC Energy FC	4–1	Swope Park Rangers	Oklahoma City, Oklahoma
17:00 (CDT)	Miguel Gonzalez 26'; José Angulo 44', 90+4'; Wojciech Wojcik (yellow card) 53'; Juan Guzman 64'; Sam Fink (yellow card) 85'	Report	Parker Maher (yellow card) 79'; Liam Doyle 88'	Stadium: Taft Stadium

October 11, 2017 USL 32	Swope Park Rangers	2–1	Seattle Sounders FC 2	Kansas City, Missouri
19:30 (CDT)	Lebo Moloto 48'; Nansel Selbol 54'; Colton Storm (yellow card) 66'; Dakota Barnathan (yellow card) 80'	Report	Zach Mathers 28' (yellow card) 79'; David Olsen (yellow card) 88'	Stadium: Children's Mercy Victory Field; Attendance: 937; Referee: Tim Wagner

=== USL Playoffs ===
October 22, 2017 Conference Quarter	Swope Park Rangers	1–1 (a.e.t.) (4–2 p)	Phoenix Rising FC	Kansas City, Missouri
15:00 CDT	Didic 109'	Report	Drogba 99'	Stadium: Children's Mercy Victory Field; Attendance: 912; Referee: Guido Gonzales Jr.
	Penalties
	Selbol (penalty scored); Duke (penalty scored); Belmar (penalty scored); Moloto (penalty scored)		(penalty missed) Lambert; (penalty scored) Dia; (penalty scored) Awako; (penalty missed) Mala
Note: Match was postponed due to lightning and heavy rain after the first half, Second half was played the following day.

October 28, 2017 Conference Semi	Swope Park Rangers	1–0	Sacramento Republic FC	Kansas City, Kansas
4:00 pm CDT	Maher (yellow card) 39'; Belmar 46'	Report	Kiffe (yellow card) 41'; Ochoa (yellow card) 67'	Stadium: Children's Mercy Park; Attendance: 1,248; Referee: Ramy Touchan
Note: Match was moved to Papa Murphy's Park due to challenges at Children's Mercy Victory Field. Then it was switched again to Children's Mercy Park.

November 4, 2017 Conference Finals	Swope Park Rangers	0–0 (a.e.t.) (7–6 p)	OKC Energy FC	Kansas City, Kansas
7:30 pm CDT	Didic (yellow card) 53'	Report	Barril (yellow card) 79'; Daly (yellow card) 90+3'; Wojcik (yellow card) 113'	Stadium: Children's Mercy Park; Attendance: 3,012; Referee: Robert Sibiga
	Penalties
	Selbol (penalty scored); Duke (penalty missed); Belmar (penalty scored); Moloto (penalty missed); Hernandez (penalty missed); Barnathan (penalty scored); Storm (penalty scored); Musa (penalty scored); Didic (penalty missed); Maher (penalty scored); Zendejas (penalty scored)		(penalty missed) Angulo; (penalty scored) Brown; (penalty missed) Hyland; (penalty missed) Wallace; (penalty scored) M. González; (penalty scored) D. Gonzalez; (penalty scored) Daly; (penalty scored) Wojcik; (penalty missed) Bond; (penalty scored) Fink; (penalty missed) Cochran

November 13, 2017 Final	Louisville City FC	1–0	Swope Park Rangers	Louisville, Kentucky
9:00 PM EST	Lancaster 88'; Kaye (yellow card) 90+3'; McCabe (red card) 90+8'	Report; Report	Musa (yellow card) 17'; Didic (yellow card) 24'	Stadium: Louisville Slugger Field; Attendance: 14,456; Referee: Jose Carlos Rivero
Note: Niall McCabe was sent off from the bench
