= 2018 Swope Park Rangers season =

Swope Park Rangers
2018 season
- Manager: Peter Vermes
- Head coach: Paulo Nagamura
- Stadium: Children's Mercy Park/Shawnee Mission District Stadium
- USL: 7th, Western Conference
- USL Playoffs: Semifinal
- Top goalscorer: Hadji Barry (19)
- Highest home attendance: 1,134 (March 24th vs. Seattle - W 4-2)
- Lowest home attendance: 458 (August 29th vs Tulsa - W 2-1)
- Average home league attendance: 881 (Total: 14,978)
Home colors	Away colors

The 2018 Swope Park Rangers season was the club's third year of play and their third season in the Western Conference of the United Soccer League, the second tier of the United States Soccer Pyramid. The Rangers moved from the Swope Soccer village to Shawnee Mission District Stadium in Overland Park, Kansas for the team's season opener, before playing the rest of the 2018 schedule at Children's Mercy Park.

== Previous season ==
The 2017 Swope Park Rangers season finished the year with a record of 17-7-8 and 4th in the Western Conference qualifying for the 2017 USL Playoffs.

In the first round, the Rangers defeated #5 seed Phoenix Rising on penalty kicks 4-2 after a draw in regulation (1-1). In the conference semi-finals, the Rangers would keep rolling with another win facing the #8 seed Sacramento Republic FC 1-0. The Rangers opponent in the conference Finals was the OKC Energy FC; they tied at the end of regulation and would win in penalty kicks 7-6. For the second year in a row, Swope Park Rangers made it to the USL Championship game; and for the second year in a row would lose the Cup, but to Louisville City FC 1-0.

== Roster ==
As of October 9, 2018

No.	Name	Nation	Position	Date of birth (age)	Signed in	Previous Club
Goalkeepers
70	Darrin MacLeod	(Canada)	GK	March 4, 1994 (age 32)	2017	(Canada) TFC Academy
79	Christian Herrera	(Mexico)	GK	April 20, 1997 (age 28)	2018	(United States) Real Monarchs
Defenders
72	Justin Bilyeu	(United States)	DF	February 3, 1994 (age 32)	2018	(United States) Rio Grande Valley FC Toros
88	Matt Lewis	(United States)	DF	August 1, 1996 (age 29)	2018	(United States) Fordham University
Defenders/Midfielders
33	Bryam Rebellón	(Colombia)	DF/MF	January 22, 1992 (age 34)	2018	(United States) Jacksonville Armada
44	Parker Maher	(United States)	DF/MF	July 12, 1993 (age 32)	2017	(United States) Saint Louis FC
58	Dakota Barnathan	(United States)	DF/MF	November 9, 1994 (age 31)	2017	(United States) Portland Timbers U23s
97	Matheus Silva	(Brazil)	DF/MF	December 8, 1996 (age 29)	2018	(United States) San Jose Earthquakes
Midfielders
40	Thierry Catherine	(Martinique)	MF	August 2, 1997 (age 28)	2018	(Martinique) Golden Lion FC
48	Kaveh Rad	(United States)	MF	June 13, 2001 (age 24)	2016	(United States) North Carolina FC Academy
49	Will Little	(United States)	MF	April 9, 1998 (age 27)	2014	(United States) FC Alliance
66	Jahon Rad	(United States)	MF	June 13, 2001 (age 24)	2016	(United States) North Carolina FC Academy
67	Ryan Fessler	(United States)	MF	March 8, 2001 (age 24)	2016	(United States) Sporting Academy
71	Chase Minter	(United States)	MF	August 19, 1992 (age 33)	2018	(United States) Real Monarchs
77	Camilo Benitez	(Ecuador)	MF	August 16, 1999 (age 26)	2014	(United States) Sporting Academy
80	Sean Karani	(United States)	MF	December 14, 2000 (age 25)	2015	(United States) Sporting Academy
85	Felipe Hernandez	(United States)	MF	June 8, 1998 (age 27)	2014	(United States) Sporting Academy
86	Roman Knox	(United States)	MF	November 25, 1999 (age 26)	2011	(United States) Sporting Academy
93	Rodrigo Saravia	(Guatemala)	MF	February 22, 1993 (age 33)	2018	(United States) FC Miami City
95	Rassambek Akhmatov	(Russia)	MF	May 31, 1996 (age 29)	2018	(United States) North Carolina FC Academy
98	Sebastian Cruz	(United States)	MF	July 31, 2000 (age 25)	2018	(United States) Sporting Academy
99	Massimo McGuire	(United States)	MF	August 30, 2000 (age 25)	2012	(United States) Sporting Academy
Forwards
36	Tyler Blackwood	(England)	FW	July 24, 1991 (age 34)	2018	(United States) Sacramento Republic FC
45	Jose Barragan	(Venezuela)	FW	May 13, 2000 (age 25)	2018	(Mexico) C.F. Pachuca
91	Ethan Vanacore-Decker	(United States)	FW	October 6, 1994 (age 31)	2018	(United States) North County United
92	Hadji Barry	(Guinea)	FW	December 8, 1992 (age 33)	2018	(United States) Orlando City SC
96	Wilson Harris	(United States)	FW	November 28, 1999 (age 26)	2017	(United States) Sporting Academy

Signed to first team contract with MLS affiliate Sporting Kansas City.
Sporting Kansas City Academy player.

== Competitions ==
=== Preseason ===
February 10, 2018	Swope Park Rangers	2–0	Rockhurst Hawks	Kansas City, Missouri
15:30 (CDT)	Barry 12', 38'	Report		Stadium: Swope Soccer Village
Note: Two 30-minute halves.

February 17, 2018	Swope Park Rangers	2–2	Tulsa Roughnecks FC	Kansas City, Missouri
14:00 (CDT)	Silva 39'; Saravia (yellow card) 50'; Barry 61' (pen.)	Report	Trialist (yellow card) 30'; Rivas 62' (pen.); Trialist 87'	Stadium: Swope Soccer Village

February 24, 2018	Swope Park Rangers	1–1	Creighton Bluejays	Kansas City, Missouri
15:30 (CDT)	Barnathan 39'	Report	57'; (yellow card) 64'	Stadium: Swope Soccer Village

February 28, 2018	Indy Eleven	2–0	Swope Park Rangers	Westfield, Indiana
14:00 (CDT)	Starikov 5' (pen.), 44'; Ferreira (yellow card) 89'	Report	Cruz (yellow card) 57'	Stadium: Grand Park

March 3, 2018	Indiana Hoosiers	2–2	Swope Park Rangers	Westfield, Indiana
20:00 (CDT)	4'; 80'		Blackwood 51', 75'	Stadium: Grand Park

March 10, 2018	Swope Park Rangers	6–1	UMKC Kangaroos	Kansas City, Missouri
14:00 (CDT)	Little 14', 92'; Busio 44'; Benitez 47'; Barry 50', 106'; Silva (yellow card) 71'	Report	Player X (yellow card) 22'; Didic 31' (o.g.); Player Y (yellow card) 110'	Stadium: Swope Soccer Village
Note: Two 45 minutes periods and one 30 minute period.

=== USL Regular season ===
==== Standings ====
Pos	Team	Pld	W	D	L	GF	GA	GD	Pts	Qualification
5	Reno 1868 FC	34	16	11	7	56	38	+18	59	Conference Playoffs
6	Portland Timbers 2	34	17	4	13	58	49	+9	55	Conference Playoffs
7	Swope Park Rangers	34	15	8	11	52	53	−1	53	Conference Playoffs
8	Saint Louis FC	34	14	11	9	44	38	+6	53	Conference Playoffs
9	San Antonio FC	34	14	8	12	45	48	−3	50	

Source: 2018 USL standings
Rules for classification: 1) total wins; 2) total goal differential; 3) total goals scored; 4) points earned against top four Conference finishers; 5) disciplinary points; 6) coin toss or drawing of lots

==== Matches ====
Win Draw Loss Upcoming fixture

March 17, 2018 USL 1	Reno 1868 FC	3–4	Swope Park Rangers	Reno, Nevada
18:00 (CDT)	Wehan 23'; Brown 60'; Lewis 89' (o.g.)	Report	Rubio 51'; Belmar 57', 90+2'; Kuzain (yellow card) 64'; Smith (yellow card) 74'; Barry 83'	Stadium: Greater Nevada Field; Attendance: 3,224; Referee: Farhad Dadkho

March 24, 2018 USL 2	Swope Park Rangers	4–2	Seattle Sounders FC 2	Overland Park, Kansas
19:30 (CDT)	Kuzain (yellow card) 17'; Belmar 21', 61'; Saravia 35'; Storm 52'; Benitez (yellow card) 64'	Preview	Estrada 19', 56'; Bwana (yellow card) 33'; Roldan (yellow card) 64'	Stadium: Shawnee Mission District Stadium; Attendance: 1,134; Referee: Jon Freemon

March 31, 2018 USL 3	Las Vegas Lights FC	2–1	Swope Park Rangers	Las Vegas, Nevada
22:00 (CDT)	Ochoa (yellow card) 32'; Huiqui (yellow card) 36'; Alvarez 53'; Storm 71' (o.g.); Garduño (yellow card) 81'; Ferriño (yellow card) 90+5'	Preview	Saravia 18' (yellow card) 76'	Stadium: Cashman Field; Attendance: 7,888; Referee: Robi Hullner

April 4, 2018 USL 4	Swope Park Rangers	1–0	Colorado Springs Switchbacks FC	Kansas City, Kansas
19:30 (CDT)	Blackwood 7'; Barry (yellow card) 58'	Report	Malcolm (yellow card) 68'	Stadium: Children's Mercy Park; Attendance: 737; Referee: Guido Gonzalez Jr.

April 7, 2018 USL 5	San Antonio FC	1–1	Swope Park Rangers	San Antonio, Texas
19:30 (CDT)	King (yellow card) 32'; Pecka 33'	Report	Belmar 29'; Didic (yellow card) 32'; Barry (yellow card) 32'; Storm (yellow card) 34'; Hernandez (yellow card) 85'; Silva (yellow card) 88'	Stadium: Toyota Field; Attendance: 6,612; Referee: Ismir Pekmic

April 14, 2018 USL -	Swope Park Rangers	v	OKC Energy FC	Overland Park, Kansas
19:30 (CDT)		Report		Stadium: Shawnee Mission District Stadium
Note: Game has been moved to September 2nd.

April 21, 2018 USL 6	Phoenix Rising FC	2–2	Swope Park Rangers	Tempe, Arizona
20:00 (CDT)	Lambert (yellow card) 8' (red card); Dubose (yellow card) 45'; Musa (yellow card) 52'; Forbes 66'; Asante 90'	Report	Hernandez (yellow card) 25'; Didic (yellow card) 28'; Belmar 70', 88' (yellow card) 89'; Kuzain (yellow card) 77'	Stadium: Phoenix Rising FC Soccer Complex; Attendance: 6,300; Referee: Victor Rivas

April 28, 2018 USL 7	Swope Park Rangers	1–1	Saint Louis FC	Kansas City, Kansas
19:30 (CDT)	Barry 3'; Maher (yellow card) 26'; Kuzain (yellow card) 68'; Saravia (yellow card) 86'	Report	Hilton (yellow card) 42'; Calistri (yellow card) 76'; Reynolds (yellow card) 82'; Barden (yellow card) 85'; Greig 88'	Stadium: Children's Mercy Park; Attendance: 900; Referee: Lukasz Szpala

May 5, 2018 USL 8	OKC Energy FC	0–1	Swope Park Rangers	Oklahoma City, Oklahoma
19:00 (CDT)	Dixon (yellow card) 13'; Ibeagha (yellow card) 70'; Angulo (yellow card) 79'; Van Oekel (yellow card) 86'	Report	Didic (yellow card) 82'; Barry 86'; Belmar (yellow card) 90+2'	Stadium: Taft Stadium; Attendance: 4,508; Referee: José Lara

May 9, 2018 USL 9	Real Monarchs SLC	4–1	Swope Park Rangers	Herriman, Utah
20:00 (CDT)	Mare (yellow card) 15' (goal) 55'; Ryden 24', 44'; Evans (o.g.)	Report	Belmar 8'	Stadium: Zions Bank Stadium; Attendance: 1,089; Referee: Elijio Arreguin

May 19, 2018 USL 10	Rio Grande Valley FC	0–0	Swope Park Rangers	Edinburg, Texas
19:30 (CDT)		Report	Rebellón (yellow card) 18'; Hernandez (yellow card) 86'	Stadium: H-E-B Park; Attendance: 4,102; Referee: Rosendo Mendoza

May 26, 2018 USL 11	Swope Park Rangers	1–0	Phoenix Rising FC	Kansas City, Kansas
19:30 (CDT)	Barry 4'; Didic (yellow card) 49'; Zendejas (yellow card) 78'	Report	Dia (yellow card) 30'; Johnson (yellow card) 57'	Stadium: Children's Mercy Park; Attendance: 916; Referee: Farhad Dadkho

June 2, 2018 USL 12	Saint Louis FC	2–0	Swope Park Rangers	Fenton, Missouri
19:30 (CDT)	Hertzog 26' (pen.); Hilton (yellow card) 43'; Barden (yellow card) 64'; Calistri 77'	Report	Rebellón (yellow card) 42' (yellow-red card) 69'; Silva (yellow card) 45+2'	Stadium: Toyota Stadium; Attendance: 3,450; Referee: Michael Radchuk

June 9, 2018 USL 13	Colorado Springs Switchbacks FC	0–1	Swope Park Rangers	Colorado Springs, Colorado
19:00 (CDT)		Report	Barry 40'	Stadium: Weidner Field; Attendance: 4,086; Referee: Miguel Urbina-Barrios

June 13, 2018 USL 14	Swope Park Rangers	3–2	Real Monarchs SLC	Kansas City, Kansas
19:30 (CDT)	Storm 22'; Minter (yellow card) 29'; Silva (yellow card) 44' (goal) 57'; Blackwood 79'	Report	Hoffman 19' (pen.), 83'; Ruíz (yellow card) 45'	Stadium: Children's Mercy Park; Attendance: 985; Referee: Jon Freemon

June 17, 2018 USL 15	Fresno FC	4–1	Swope Park Rangers	Fresno, California
20:00 (CDT)	Chaney 4'; Barrera 23'; Ellis-Hayden (yellow card) 27'; Johnson 32'; Argueta (yellow card) 76'; Bustamante 82'; Tayou (yellow card) 87'	Report	Smith (yellow card) 34'; Harris 86'	Stadium: Chukchansi Park; Attendance: 3,370; Referee: Malik Badawi

June 24, 2018 USL 16	Swope Park Rangers	3–2	Las Vegas Lights FC	Kansas City, Kansas
16:00 (CDT)	Sinovic 12'; Belmar 56'; Kuzain 67'; Barry (yellow card) 83'	Report	Kobayashi 21'; Mendoza (yellow card) 46'; Jaime (yellow card) 60'; Alatorre (yellow card) 83'; Mendiola (yellow card) 83'; Ochoa 87'	Stadium: Children's Mercy Park; Attendance: 923; Referee: Sergii Demianchuk

July 5, 2018 USL 17	Seattle Sounders FC 2	0–2	Swope Park Rangers	Tacoma, Washington
21:00 (CDT)	Saari (yellow card) 64'	Report	Hernandez 10'; Silva (yellow card) 21' (yellow-red card); Storm (yellow card) 33'; Lewis (yellow card) 53'; Barry 65' (pen.); Dick (yellow card) 90+1'	Stadium: Cheney Stadium; Attendance: 2,367; Referee: Joseph Dickerson

July 10, 2018 USL 18	Swope Park Rangers	1–3	Sacramento Republic FC	Kansas City, Kansas
19:30 (CDT)	Barry 70'	Report	Iwasa 45', 54'; Eissele (yellow card) 67' (goal) 88'; Klienta (yellow card) 73'	Stadium: Children's Mercy Park; Attendance: 941; Referee: Rubiel Vazquez
Note: game was rescheduled from July 27th.

July 14, 2018 USL 19	Portland Timbers 2	2–1	Swope Park Rangers	Portland, Oregon
21:00 (CDT)	Langsdorf 23'; Loría 45+2'; Williamson (yellow card) 60'	Report	Harris 59'; Silva (yellow card) 66'	Stadium: Providence Park; Attendance: 1,034; Referee: Robi Hullner

July 18, 2018 USL 20	Swope Park Rangers	0–4	Orange County SC	Kansas City, Kansas
19:30 (CDT)	Hernandez (yellow card) 58'	Report	Seaton 13'; Enevoldsen 71'; Ramos-Godoy 79'; Quinn 82' (pen.)	Stadium: Children's Mercy Park; Attendance: 1,011; Referee: Luis Guardia

July 22, 2018 USL 21	Swope Park Rangers	0–0	Rio Grande Valley FC	Kansas City, Kansas
16:00 (CDT)		Report		Stadium: Children's Mercy Park; Attendance: 933; Referee: Ramy Touchan

August 1, 2018 USL 22	LA Galaxy II	1–1	Swope Park Rangers	Carson, California
21:30 (CDT)	López 60'; Vera (yellow card) 64'; Hilliard-Arce (yellow card) 77'	Report	Barry 51', (yellow card) 73' (yellow-red card) 86'; Smith (yellow card) 54'; Rebellón (yellow card) 81'	Stadium: StubHub Center Track & Field Stadium; Attendance: 801; Referee: Mark Allatin

August 4, 2018 USL 23	Orange County SC	2–1	Swope Park Rangers	Irvine, California
21:00 (CDT)	Jones 16', 43'	Report	Hernandez 19'; Minter (yellow card) 25'; Smith (yellow card) 57'	Stadium: Championship Soccer Stadium; Attendance: 3,204; Referee: Samantha Martinez

August 11, 2018 USL 24	Swope Park Rangers	0–2	Portland Timbers 2	Kansas City, Kansas
19:30 (CDT)	Smith (yellow card) 55'	Report	Ebobisse 7'; Barmby 55' (pen)	Stadium: Children's Mercy Park; Attendance: 964; Referee: Daniel Gutierrez

August 19, 2018 USL 25	Swope Park Rangers	3–3	Reno 1868 FC	Kansas City, Kansas
16:00 (CDT)	Blackwood 7', 29'; Kuzain (yellow card) 20'; Belmar (yellow card) 89'; Barry 90+3'	Report	Brown 12', 64'; Van Ewijk 82'	Stadium: Children's Mercy Park; Attendance: 462; Referee: Matthew Franz

August 25, 2018 USL 26	San Antonio FC	1–2	Swope Park Rangers	San Antonio, Texas
19:30 (CDT)	King (yellow card) 24', (goal) 54'	Report	Barry 6'; Didic 25'; Storm (yellow card) 65'; Rebellón (yellow card) 79'	Stadium: Toyota Field; Attendance: 6,896; Referee: Timothy Ford

August 29, 2018 USL 27	Swope Park Rangers	2–1	Tulsa Roughnecks FC	Kansas City, Kansas
19:30 (CDT)	Kuzain 27'; Maher (yellow card) 32'; Barry (yellow card) 45+1', (goal) 79'; Lindsey (yellow card) 60'; Smith (yellow card) 75'; Vanacore-Decker (yellow card) 90'	Report	Gamble 15'; Vukovic (yellow card) 52'; Morton (yellow card) 65'; Tavares (yellow card) 70'	Stadium: Children's Mercy Park; Attendance: 458; Referee: Jonathan Bilinski

September 2, 2018 USL 28	Swope Park Rangers	1–0	OKC Energy FC	Kansas City, Kansas
16:00 (CDT)	Barry 26'	Report	Barril (yellow card) 61'; R. Dixon (yellow card) 84'	Stadium: Children's Mercy Park; Attendance: 993; Referee: Sergii Demianchuk
Note: Game was moved from April 14th.

September 9, 2018 USL 29	Swope Park Rangers	1–0	Fresno FC	Kansas City, Kansas
16:00 (CDT)	Barry 14', (yellow card) 66'; Bilyeu (yellow card) 29'	Report	Reynish (yellow card) 35'; Cooper (yellow card) 53'; Ellis-Hayden (yellow card) 60'; Caffa (yellow card) 90+1'; Daly (yellow card) 90+3'	Stadium: Children's Mercy Park; Attendance: 961; Referee: Kevin Broadley

September 15, 2018 USL 30	Swope Park Rangers	3–4	Saint Louis FC	Kansas City, Kansas
19:30 (CDT)	Barry 22'; Rebellón (yellow card) 45+3'; Belmar (yellow card) 48'; Blackwood 84'; Vanacore-Decker 90+4'	Report	Cox 37', (yellow card) 41'; Walls 45+5'; Calistri 59', (yellow card) 80'; Greig 82'; Martz (yellow card) 88'; Culbertson (yellow card) 90+3'	Stadium: Children's Mercy Park; Attendance: 1,013; Referee: Rosendo Mendoza

September 19, 2018 USL 31	Swope Park Rangers	2–0	San Antonio FC	Kansas City, Kansas
19:30 (CDT)	Barry 51'; Bilyeu (yellow card) 63'; Blackwood 75'	Report	Hedrick (yellow card) 27'; Lopez (yellow card) 49'	Stadium: Children's Mercy Park; Attendance: 573; Referee: Ismir Pekmic

September 22, 2018 USL 32	Tulsa Roughnecks FC	1–1	Swope Park Rangers	Tulsa, Oklahoma
19:00 (CDT)	Rivas 68'; Morton (yellow card) 86'	Report	Barry 44'; Silva (yellow card) 67'; Minter (yellow card) 90+2'	Stadium: ONEOK Field; Attendance: 3,422; Referee: Elvis Osmanovic

October 3, 2018 USL 33	Sacramento Republic FC	3–1	Swope Park Rangers	Sacramento, California
21:30 (CDT)	Bijev 17'; Iwasa 57'; Hall (yellow card) 60'; Matjašič 76'	Report	Blackwood 31'	Stadium: Papa Murphy's Park; Attendance: 9.757; Referee: Daniel Radford

October 14, 2018 USL 34	Swope Park Rangers	5–1	LA Galaxy II	Kansas City, Kansas
16:00 (CDT)	Storm (yellow card) 9'; Kuzain 28'; Belmar 34'; Barry 65' (pen.); Hernandez 76'; Harris 84'	Report	Hilliard-Arce (yellow card) 27'; Hernandez 85'	Stadium: Children's Mercy Park; Attendance: 1,074; Referee: Kevin Broadley

==== Postseason ====
October 20 Quarterfinal	Sacramento Republic FC	1–2	Swope Park Rangers	Sacramento, California
9:30 P.M.	Bijev 16'; Matjašič (yellow card) 38'; Hord (yellow card) 68'	Report	Kuzain 27'; Barry 31'; Akhmatov (yellow card) 58'	Stadium: Papa Murphy's Park; Attendance: 11,569; Referee: Joseph Dickerso

October 26 Semifinal	Phoenix Rising FC	4–2	Swope Park Rangers	Tempe, Arizona
8:30 P.M.	Johnson 22'; Drogba (yellow card) 29' (goal) 90+4'; Cortez 36'; Lambert 48'	Report	Blackwood 26'; Barry 33'; Akhmatov (yellow card) 49'	Stadium: Phoenix Rising FC Soccer Complex; Attendance: 7,707; Referee: Guido Gonzales Jr.

== Player statistics ==
=== Top scorers ===
Rank	Position	Name	USL Season	USL Playoffs	Total
1	FW	(Guinea) Hadji Barry	17	2	19
2	FW	(United States) Kharlton Belmar	10	0	10
3	FW	(England) Tyler Blackwood	7	1	8
4	MF	(Malaysia) Wan Kuzain	3	1	4
5	FW	(United States) Wilson Harris	3	0	3
5	MF	(Colombia) Felipe Hernandez	3	0	3
7	MF	(Guatemala) Rodrigo Saravia	2	0	2
7	DF	(United States) Colton Storm	2	0	2
9	DF	(Canada) Amer Didic	1	0	1
9	FW	(Chile) Diego Rubio	1	0	1
9	FW	(United States) Ethan Vanacore-Decker	1	0	1
9	MF	(Brazil) Matheus Silva	1	0	1
9	DF	(United States) Seth Sinovic	1	0	1
