= 2017 USL season =

7th season of the USL

United Soccer League
- Season: 2017
- Champions: Louisville City FC (1st Title)
- Regular Season Title: Real Monarchs SLC (1st Title)
- Matches: 480
- Goals: 1,313 (2.74 per match)
- Best player: (Jamaica) Dane Kelly Reno 1868 FC
- Top goalscorer: (Jamaica) Dane Kelly Reno 1868 FC (18 Goals)
- Best goalkeeper: (United States) Diego Restrepo San Antonio FC
- Biggest home win: RNO 9–0 LAG (July 3) (USL Record)
- Biggest away win: POR 0–4 SAN (April 28); PHX 0–4 RNO (May 6); BST 0–4 CLT (July 29); OCO 0–4 COS (August 8); VAN 0–4 PHX (September 24); CHS 0–4 NYR (October 21 – postseason)
- Highest scoring: ORL 5–6 NYR (October 7) (Ties USL Record)
- Longest winning run: 9 games Real Monarchs SLC (April 22 – June 19) (USL Record)
- Longest unbeaten run: 14 games San Antonio FC (March 26 – June 17)
- Longest losing run: 6 games Portland Timbers 2 (May 24 – June 24)
- Highest attendance: 30,417; CIN 4–2 NYR (September 16) (USL record)
- Lowest attendance: 143; TOR 0–1 ROC (September 2)
- Total attendance: 2,065,006
- Average attendance: 4,302
- All statistics correct as of October 15, 2017.

The 2017 USL season was the seventh season of the United Soccer League. The league was granted provisional Division II status by the USSF. It was organized by the United Soccer Leagues.

New York Red Bulls II were the defending champions of both the USL Cup and Regular Season.

== Changes from 2016 ==
Expansion

- Reno 1868 FC

Joined from NASL

- Ottawa Fury FC
- Tampa Bay Rowdies

Rebrand

- Arizona United SC to Phoenix Rising FC

Folded

- FC Montreal

== Rule changes ==
Teams are now permitted only three substitutions a match. Previously, teams were allowed five substitutions a match.

== Teams ==
Team	Location	Stadium	Capacity	Manager	MLS Affiliate/Partnership
Bethlehem Steel FC	Bethlehem, Pennsylvania	Goodman Stadium	16,000	(United States) Brendan Burke	Philadelphia Union
Charleston Battery	Charleston, South Carolina	MUSC Health Stadium	5,100	(United States) Michael Anhaeuser	Atlanta United FC
Charlotte Independence	Matthews, North Carolina	Sportsplex at Matthews	2,300	(United States) Mike Jeffries	Colorado Rapids
Colorado Springs Switchbacks FC	Colorado Springs, Colorado	Switchbacks Training Stadium	5,000	(United States) Steve Trittschuh	
FC Cincinnati	Cincinnati, Ohio	Nippert Stadium	35,061	(South Africa) Alan Koch	
Harrisburg City Islanders	Harrisburg, Pennsylvania	FNB Field	6,187	(United States) Bill Becher	
LA Galaxy II	Carson, California	StubHub Center Track and Field Stadium	2,000	(United States) Mike Muñoz	LA Galaxy
Louisville City FC	Louisville, Kentucky	Louisville Slugger Field	13,131	(Republic of Ireland) James O'Connor	
New York Red Bulls II	Montclair, New Jersey	MSU Soccer Park at Pittser Field	3,000	(United States) John Wolyniec	New York Red Bulls
OKC Energy FC	Oklahoma City, Oklahoma	Taft Stadium	7,500	(Denmark) Jimmy Nielsen	FC Dallas
Orange County SC	Irvine, California	Championship Soccer Stadium	5,000	(United States) Logan Pause	Los Angeles FC
Orlando City B	Orlando, Florida	Orlando City Stadium	3,500 †	(Wales) Anthony Pulis	Orlando City SC
Ottawa Fury FC	Ottawa, Ontario	TD Place Stadium	24,000	(Canada) Julian de Guzman (Interim)	Montreal Impact
Phoenix Rising FC	Scottsdale, Arizona	Phoenix Rising FC Soccer Complex	6,200	(France) Patrice Carteron	
Pittsburgh Riverhounds	Pittsburgh, Pennsylvania	Highmark Stadium	3,500	(United States) Dave Brandt	Columbus Crew SC
Portland Timbers 2	Portland, Oregon	Providence Park	21,144	(United States) Andrew Gregor	Portland Timbers
Real Monarchs SLC	Sandy, Utah	Rio Tinto Stadium	20,213	(England) Mark Briggs	Real Salt Lake
Reno 1868 FC	Reno, Nevada	Greater Nevada Field	9,013	(United States) Ian Russell	San Jose Earthquakes
Richmond Kickers	Richmond, Virginia	City Stadium	22,000	(England) Leigh Cowlishaw	D.C. United
Rio Grande Valley FC Toros	Edinburg, Texas	H-E-B Park	9,400	(United States) Junior Gonzalez	Houston Dynamo
Rochester Rhinos	Rochester, New York	Capelli Sport Stadium	13,768	(United States) Bob Lilley	New England Revolution
Sacramento Republic FC	Sacramento, California	Papa Murphy's Park	11,569	(England) Paul Buckle	
Saint Louis FC	Fenton, Missouri	Toyota Stadium	5,500	(Serbia) Predrag Radosavljevic	
San Antonio FC	San Antonio, Texas	Toyota Field	8,296	(England) Darren Powell	New York City FC
Seattle Sounders FC 2	Tukwila, Washington	Starfire Sports Complex	4,500	(Saint Vincent and the Grenadines) Ezra Hendrickson	Seattle Sounders FC
Swope Park Rangers	Kansas City, Missouri	Swope Soccer Village	3,557	(Serbia) Nikola Popovic	Sporting Kansas City
Tampa Bay Rowdies	St. Petersburg, Florida	Al Lang Stadium	7,227	(Scotland) Stuart Campbell	
Toronto FC II	Vaughan, Ontario	Ontario Soccer Centre	2,000	(Canada) Jason Bent	Toronto FC
Tulsa Roughnecks FC	Tulsa, Oklahoma	ONEOK Field	7,833	(United States) David Vaudreuil	Chicago Fire
Vancouver Whitecaps FC 2	Vancouver, British Columbia	Thunderbird Stadium	3,500	(Canada) Rich Fagan	Vancouver Whitecaps FC

† Capacity for venue is 25,500; Team moved from Melbourne, Florida to Orlando in April 2017 to allow direct player transfers with MLS parent club Orlando City SC.

Affiliate
Partnership

=== Other venues ===
- The Charlotte Independence played its first few home games at Eagle Field on the campus of Winthrop University in Rock Hill, South Carolina as the Sportsplex at Matthews was being built.

== Competition format ==
The season started on March 25 and ended October 15. The top eight finishers in each conference qualified for the playoffs.

=== Managerial changes ===
Team	Outgoing manager	Manner of departure	Date of vacancy	Incoming manager	Date of appointment
Real Monarchs	(United States) Mike Petke	Promoted	March 29, 2017	(England) Mark Briggs	March 30, 2017
Phoenix Rising FC	(Canada) Frank Yallop	Resigned	April 24, 2017	(United States) Rick Schantz (Interim)	April 24, 2017
Phoenix Rising FC	(United States) Rick Schantz (Interim)	End of interim period	May 22, 2017	(France) Patrice Carteron	May 22, 2017
Ottawa Fury	(Scotland) Paul Dalglish	Resigned	August 15, 2017	(Canada) Julian de Guzman (Interim)	August 15, 2017

== League table ==
Eastern Conference

Pos	Team	Pld	W	D	L	GF	GA	GD	Pts	Qualification
1	Louisville City FC (C)	32	18	8	6	58	31	+27	62	Conference Playoffs
2	Charleston Battery	32	15	9	8	53	33	+20	54	Conference Playoffs
3	Tampa Bay Rowdies	32	14	11	7	50	35	+15	53	Conference Playoffs
4	Rochester Rhinos	32	14	11	7	36	28	+8	53	Conference Playoffs
5	Charlotte Independence	32	13	9	10	52	40	+12	48	Conference Playoffs
6	FC Cincinnati	32	12	10	10	46	48	−2	46	Conference Playoffs
7	New York Red Bulls II	32	13	5	14	57	60	−3	44	Conference Playoffs
8	Bethlehem Steel FC	32	12	8	12	46	45	+1	44	Conference Playoffs
9	Orlando City B	32	10	12	10	37	36	+1	42	
10	Ottawa Fury	32	8	14	10	42	41	+1	38	
11	Harrisburg City Islanders	32	10	7	15	28	47	−19	37	
12	Saint Louis FC	32	9	9	14	35	48	−13	36	
13	Pittsburgh Riverhounds	32	8	12	12	33	42	−9	36	
14	Richmond Kickers	32	8	8	16	24	36	−12	32	
15	Toronto FC II	32	6	7	19	27	54	−27	25	

Source: 2017 USL standings
Rules for classification: 1) total wins; 2) total goal differential; 3) total goals scored; 4) points earned against top four Conference finishers; 5) disciplinary points; 6) coin toss or drawing of lots
(C) Champions

Western Conference

Pos	Team	Pld	W	D	L	GF	GA	GD	Pts	Qualification
1	Real Monarchs (X)	32	20	7	5	59	31	+28	67	Conference Playoffs
2	San Antonio FC	32	17	11	4	45	24	+21	62	Conference Playoffs
3	Reno 1868 FC	32	17	8	7	75	39	+36	59	Conference Playoffs
4	Swope Park Rangers	32	17	7	8	55	37	+18	58	Conference Playoffs
5	Phoenix Rising FC	32	17	7	8	50	37	+13	58	Conference Playoffs
6	OKC Energy FC	32	14	7	11	46	41	+5	49	Conference Playoffs
7	Tulsa Roughnecks	32	14	4	14	46	49	−3	46	Conference Playoffs
8	Sacramento Republic	32	13	7	12	45	43	+2	46	Conference Playoffs
9	Colorado Springs Switchbacks	32	12	8	12	55	51	+4	44	
10	Orange County SC	32	11	10	11	43	47	−4	43	
11	Rio Grande Valley Toros	32	9	8	15	37	50	−13	35	
12	Seattle Sounders 2	32	9	4	19	42	61	−19	31	
13	LA Galaxy II	32	8	5	19	32	64	−32	29	
14	Vancouver Whitecaps 2	32	5	9	18	32	52	−20	24	
15	Portland Timbers 2	32	3	6	23	27	63	−36	15	

Source: 2017 USL standings
Rules for classification: 1) total wins; 2) total goal differential; 3) total goals scored; 4) points earned against top four Conference finishers; 5) disciplinary points; 6) coin toss or drawing of lots
(X) Regular Season League Champion

== Results table ==
Home • Away • Win • Loss • Draw
Club	Match																															
Club	1	2	3	4	5	6	7	8	9	10	11	12	13	14	15	16	17	18	19	20	21	22	23	24	25	26	27	28	29	30	31	32
Bethlehem Steel FC (BST)	ROC	CIN	HAR	ORL	CIN	CHS	TOR	CIN	CHS	HAR	OTT	STL	NYR	HAR	RIC	NYR	PGH	RIC	CLT	OTT	TOR	CLT	LOU	PGH	ORL	LOU	PGH	TBR	TBR	TOR	ROC	STL
Bethlehem Steel FC (BST)	2–3	2–0	2–3	0–2	1–0	0–1	1–0	1–2	0–1	3–1	1–1	2–1	2–0	1–0	1–1	2–0	1–1	2–3	0–4	2–1	3–1	0–1	1–3	2–3	1–1	2–2	3–2	2–2	1–1	4–2	0–1	1–1
Charleston Battery (CHS)	CIN	CLT	PGH	ROC	TBR	OTT	BST	STL	HAR	BST	NYR	LOU	RIC	CIN	TOR	TBR	LOU	STL	TBR	PGH	ORL	TOR	NYR	ROC	RIC	LOU	RIC	CLT	ORL	OTT	HAR	CLT
Charleston Battery (CHS)	2–1	2–0	1–2	5–0	3–2	2–2	1–0	1–0	2–2	1–0	1–2	4–4	1–0	2–2	6–1	2–0	1–1	0–1	0–2	2–2	0–0	0–1	1–1	1–0	1–3	0–1	1–0	3–0	1–2	1–1	4–0	1–0
Charlotte Independence (CLT)	CHS	ORL	PGH	STL	ROC	NYR	ORL	TBR	LOU	CIN	HAR	RIC	ROC	PGH	STL	NYR	HAR	RIC	BST	LOU	TOR	OTT	BST	ORL	TOR	RIC	OTT	CHS	TBR	CIN	LOU	CHS
Charlotte Independence (CLT)	0–2	1–1	1–1	2–1	0–4	5–1	3–1	2–2	0–1	1–1	2–0	2–0	2–1	3–1	5–1	3–2	1–1	0–0	4–0	3–1	2–2	1–3	1–0	1–1	2–3	3–0	1–1	0–3	0–1	0–1	1–2	0–1
Colorado Springs Switchbacks (COS)	TUL	OKC	SAN	RGV	SLC	RNO	SEA	TUL	POR	VAN	SLC	RNO	OKC	LAG	SPR	SAN	RGV	VAN	PHX	OKC	SEA	POR	OCO	SLC	LAG	SAC	PHX	SEA	SPR	OCO	SAC	TUL
Colorado Springs Switchbacks (COS)	1-4	1–1	1–1	1–3	2–1	2–2	2–3	3–0	0–0	1–3	1–4	3–3	1–0	2–1	1–2	1–0	0–1	2–2	1–2	3–4	2–1	4–1	4–0	0–2	1–2	2–2	1–2	1–1	1–3	2–1	1–0	4–2
FC Cincinnati (CIN)	CHS	PGH	BST	STL	TBR	LOU	BST	RIC	ORL	BST	TOR	ROC	CLT	CHS	STL	ORL	TBR	RIC	LOU	HAR	ROC	ORL	LOU	NYR	OTT	PGH	HAR	NYR	STL	CLT	OTT	TOR
FC Cincinnati (CIN)	1–2	1–0	0–2	4–0	1–1	1–1	0–1	1–1	0–2	2–1	1–0	0–1	1–1	2–2	2–0	1–1	0–2	2–0	3–2	3–0	2–3	2–2	0–5	0–4	3–1	1–1	1–1	4–2	2–2	1–0	0–4	4–3
Harrisburg City Islanders (HAR)	RIC	NYR	BST	ORL	PGH	NYR	RIC	CHS	PGH	BST	OTT	CLT	BST	LOU	TOR	ROC	NYR	RIC	CLT	CIN	ORL	TBR	ROC	PGH	LOU	TBR	STL	CIN	TOR	OTT	STL	CHS
Harrisburg City Islanders (HAR)	0–1	1–0	3–2	1–1	0–1	1–3	0–0	2–2	0–0	1–3	0–1	0–2	0–1	1–0	4–3	0–1	2–0	1–0	1–1	0–3	0–0	0–3	0–1	0–3	0–5	2–3	2–1	1–1	2–1	1–0	2–0	0–4
Los Angeles Galaxy II (LAG)	VAN	SAN	PHX	SEA	OCO	OCO	SLC	NYR	RGV	PHX	SEA	COS	RGV	SAC	SPR	RNO	POR	TUL	OKC	OCO	PHX	COS	VAN	RGV	RNO	SAN	SAC	TUL	SPR	OKC	POR	SLC
Los Angeles Galaxy II (LAG)	2–0	0–3	1–2	1–2	1–1	0–4	0–3	2–1	1–1	1–2	0–3	1–2	1–0	2–3	0–1	0–9	4–3	2–2	1–1	1–0	0–2	2–1	1–2	1–0	1–2	1–1	1–2	0–1	0–3	0–3	3–2	1–2
Louisville City FC (LOU)	STL	ORL	RIC	TBR	CIN	TOR	TBR	PGH	CHS	CLT	NYR	PGH	HAR	OTT	CHS	CIN	STL	NYR	CLT	CIN	BST	HAR	ORL	CHS	PGH	BST	ROC	OTT	TOR	ROC	CLT	RIC
Louisville City FC (LOU)	0–0	3–1	1–0	2–1	1–1	0–0	0–2	1–0	4–4	1–0	3–0	3–0	0–1	2–1	1–1	2–3	4–1	2–1	1–3	5–0	3–1	5–0	0–3	1–0	3–0	2–2	2–1	1–1	0–1	0–0	2–1	3–1
New York Red Bulls II (NYR)	PGH	RIC	HAR	STL	ORL	ROC	HAR	CLT	LAG	OTT	CHS	RIC	LOU	BST	OTT	STL	BST	HAR	CLT	TOR	LOU	ROC	CHS	CIN	OTT	TBR	TOR	CIN	PGH	TBR	ORL	ROC
New York Red Bulls II (NYR)	3–3	1–0	0–1	2–3	3–1	2–2	3–1	1–5	1–2	3–4	2–1	1–0	0–3	0–2	2–2	1–0	0–2	0–2	2–3	1–0	1–2	2–1	1–1	4–0	2–2	4–2	2–1	2–4	2–0	2–3	6–5	1–2
Oklahoma City Energy FC (OKC)	SPR	COS	RGV	SAC	RGV	PHX	OCO	POR	COS	PHX	SAN	POR	SEA	VAN	SLC	TUL	SAN	COS	LAG	RNO	SLC	TUL	SAN	OCO	SPR	VAN	TUL	RNO	SAC	LAG	SPR	SEA
Oklahoma City Energy FC (OKC)	1–3	1–1	0–1	1–0	0–3	1–2	1–0	2–1	0–1	3–2	0–0	3–1	2–3	2–2	1–3	1–2	1–1	4–3	1–1	1–0	2–0	1–2	0–0	2–1	0–2	0–0	2–0	0–3	3–1	3–0	4–1	3–1
Orange County SC (OCO)	RNO	SAC	POR	LAG	LAG	TUL	OKC	SLC	SEA	POR	PHX	SEA	RGV	RGV	VAN	LAG	SAN	COS	SPR	TUL	PHX	OKC	RNO	PHX	SPR	SAN	VAN	SLC	COS	SAC	RNO	VAN
Orange County SC (OCO)	2–0	0–4	2–1	1–1	4–0	0–4	0–1	0–1	4–3	3–3	1–1	2–1	1–1	4–0	1–0	0–1	1–1	0–4	1–1	0–0	1–1	1–2	1–3	0–0	2–1	0–1	2–1	0–0	1–2	3–1	1–4	4–3
Orlando City B (ORL)	TBR	LOU	TOR	CLT	NYR	HAR	BST	STL	CIN	CLT	PGH	ROC	TOR	OTT	ROC	CIN	PGH	TBR	CHS	HAR	CIN	RIC	OTT	CLT	LOU	BST	RIC	STL	CHS	RIC	NYR	TBR
Orlando City B (ORL)	0–1	1–3	3–1	1–1	1–3	1–1	2–0	0–0	2–0	1–3	2–1	1–1	0–1	0–1	1–0	1–1	0–0	1–1	0–0	0–0	2–2	1–0	3–0	1–1	3–0	1–1	0–2	0–2	2–1	1–0	5–6	0–2
Ottawa Fury FC (OTT)	STL	TBR	RIC	TOR	CHS	TBR	PGH	NYR	RIC	BST	HAR	ROC	ORL	NYR	LOU	TOR	ROC	TOR	BST	CLT	ORL	TBR	CIN	NYR	STL	ROC	CLT	LOU	HAR	CHS	CIN	PGH
Ottawa Fury FC (OTT)	2–3	0–1	1–0	1–1	2–2	0–0	0–1	4–3	5–3	1–1	1–0	0–1	1–0	2–2	1–2	0–1	1–1	2–0	1–2	3–1	0–3	1–1	1–3	2–2	2–2	1–1	1–1	1–1	0–1	1–1	4–0	1–1
Phoenix Rising FC (PHX)	TOR	SLC	LAG	SPR	RNO	OKC	SAN	LAG	OKC	VAN	SPR	SLC	RNO	OCO	COS	TUL	SAN	LAG	RGV	OCO	SAC	SEA	OCO	COS	SLC	SEA	VAN	POR	SAC	TUL	RGV	POR
Phoenix Rising FC (PHX)	0–1	0–2	2–1	4–3	0–4	2–1	0–1	2–1	2–3	2–1	2–2	1–1	0–0	1–1	2–1	0–3	0–1	2–0	1–1	1–1	3–1	2–0	0–0	2–1	2–0	1–0	4–0	2–0	0–2	4–3	2–0	4–1
Pittsburgh Riverhounds (PGH)	NYR	CIN	CHS	STL	CLT	RIC	HAR	TOR	OTT	LOU	HAR	ORL	TOR	LOU	TBR	CLT	ORL	BST	ROC	CHS	TBR	RIC	HAR	STL	BST	CIN	LOU	ROC	BST	NYR	ROC	OTT
Pittsburgh Riverhounds (PGH)	3–3	0–1	2–1	1–2	1–1	1–2	1–0	1–0	1–0	0–1	0–0	1–2	1–1	0–3	2–0	1–3	0–0	1–1	0–0	2–2	0–2	1–1	3–0	2–1	3–2	1–1	0–3	1–1	2–3	0–2	0–2	1–1
Portland Timbers 2 (POR)	SLC	SPR	SEA	OCO	VAN	SAC	SAN	SEA	COS	OKC	TUL	VAN	SLC	OKC	RNO	OCO	LAG	SPR	RNO	RGV	COS	SAC	SEA	RGV	TUL	SLC	RNO	PHX	VAN	LAG	SAN	PHX
Portland Timbers 2 (POR)	1–2	0–1	1–2	1–2	0–1	2–0	0–4	0–2	0–0	1–2	1–3	0–1	0–2	1–3	0–2	3–3	3–4	0–1	1–1	2–1	1–4	0–1	1–2	1–1	1–1	0–0	1–6	0–2	1–0	2–3	1–2	1–4
Real Monarchs SLC (SLC)	POR	PHX	RNO	COS	SEA	SPR	LAG	SAC	COS	VAN	OCO	POR	RNO	PHX	TUL	OKC	SEA	SAN	RGV	TUL	OKC	COS	SPR	RGV	SAN	POR	PHX	OCO	SAC	RNO	VAN	LAG
Real Monarchs SLC (SLC)	2–1	2–0	5–3	1–2	3–1	2–1	3–0	2–0	4–1	2–1	1–0	2–0	2–1	1–1	0–2	3–1	4–1	2–2	2–1	0–0	0–2	2–0	2–2	2–1	1–2	0–0	0–2	0–0	2–0	3–0	1–1	2–1
Reno 1868 FC (RNO)	OCO	VAN	SLC	SAN	COS	PHX	SEA	TUL	COS	RGV	SAC	SLC	POR	PHX	LAG	VAN	POR	SPR	OKC	TUL	SAN	SAC	SPR	OCO	LAG	SEA	RGV	OKC	POR	SLC	OCO	SAC
Reno 1868 FC (RNO)	0–2	1–1	3–5	0–4	2–2	4–0	6–0	4–0	3–3	3–2	2–0	1–2	2–0	0–0	9–0	1–1	1–1	4–1	0–1	3–2	2–0	2–1	1–0	3–1	2–1	1–1	0–1	3–0	6–1	0–3	4–1	2–2
Richmond Kickers (RIC)	HAR	NYR	LOU	OTT	PGH	TBR	CIN	HAR	ROC	TOR	OTT	NYR	CHS	TBR	CLT	BST	CIN	HAR	BST	CLT	STL	PGH	ORL	TOR	CHS	CLT	ORL	CHS	ROC	ORL	STL	LOU
Richmond Kickers (RIC)	1–0	0–1	0–1	0–1	2–1	0–1	1–1	0–0	1–1	0–0	3–5	0–1	0–1	1–1	0–2	1–1	0–2	0–1	3–2	0–0	0–1	1–1	0–1	2–1	3–1	0–3	2–0	0–1	1–0	0–1	1–0	1–3
Rio Grande Valley Toros (RGV)	SAN	TUL	OKC	COS	TUL	OKC	SPR	LAG	SAC	RNO	SEA	LAG	SAC	COS	SPR	OCO	OCO	SLC	POR	VAN	SEA	PHX	VAN	SLC	POR	LAG	SAN	RNO	SAC	SPR	PHX	SAN
Rio Grande Valley Toros (RGV)	0–1	0–1	1–0	3–1	0–1	3–0	1–0	1–1	0–0	2–3	3–1	0–1	2–6	1–0	0–4	1–1	0–4	1–2	1–2	3–3	4–3	1–1	1–1	1–2	1–1	0–1	1–2	1–0	1–0	2–2	0–2	1–3
Rochester Rhinos (ROC)	BST	TOR	CHS	NYR	CLT	RIC	TBR	CIN	ORL	TBR	OTT	ORL	CLT	STL	HAR	OTT	PGH	TOR	CIN	NYR	HAR	CHS	STL	TOR	OTT	PGH	LOU	RIC	LOU	PGH	BST	NYR
Rochester Rhinos (ROC)	3–2	0–0	0–5	2–2	4–0	1–1	1–0	1–0	1–1	1–1	1–0	0–1	1–2	0–0	1–0	1–1	0–0	2–0	3–2	1–2	1–0	0–1	2–1	1–0	1–1	1–1	1–2	0–1	0–0	2–0	1–0	2–1
Sacramento Republic FC (SAC)	SEA	OCO	TUL	OKC	SPR	POR	VAN	SAN	SLC	TUL	SEA	RGV	RNO	VAN	RGV	LAG	SAN	SEA	VAN	POR	RNO	SPR	PHX	COS	RGV	LAG	OKC	SLC	PHX	OCO	COS	RNO
Sacramento Republic FC (SAC)	2–1	4–0	2–1	0–1	0–1	0–2	0–0	0–1	0–2	3–2	2–2	0–0	0–2	2–1	6–2	3–2	1–1	2–0	1–0	1–0	1–2	2–2	1–3	2–2	2–1	2–1	1–3	0–2	2–0	1–3	0–1	2–2
Saint Louis FC (STL)	LOU	OTT	NYR	PGH	CIN	CLT	ORL	CHS	TBR	TOR	BST	CIN	NYR	ROC	CLT	CHS	LOU	RIC	SPR	TUL	TBR	PGH	TUL	ROC	TOR	OTT	HAR	ORL	CIN	HAR	RIC	BST
Saint Louis FC (STL)	0–0	3–2	3–2	2–1	0–4	1–2	0–0	0–1	1–1	2–0	1–2	0–2	0–1	0–0	1–5	1–0	1–4	1–0	0–0	1–2	4–3	1–2	2–1	1–2	1–1	2–2	1–2	2–0	2–2	0–2	0–1	1–1
San Antonio FC (SAN)	RGV	LAG	COS	RNO	VAN	SEA	POR	SAC	SEA	PHX	SPR	SPR	OKC	TUL	COS	SAC	OKC	SLC	PHX	OCO	RNO	OKC	VAN	SLC	LAG	OCO	SPR	RGV	TUL	TBR	POR	RGV
San Antonio FC (SAN)	1–0	3–0	1–1	4–0	2–1	3–2	4–0	1–0	0–0	1–0	1–0	0–0	0–0	3–1	0–1	1–1	1–1	2–2	1–0	1–1	0–2	0–0	1–0	2–1	1–1	1–0	2–5	0–1	2–0	1–1	2–1	3–1
Seattle Sounders 2 (SEA)	SAC	POR	VAN	LAG	SLC	SAN	COS	POR	SAN	RNO	SAC	LAG	RGV	OKC	OCO	VAN	SLC	OCO	SPR	SAC	COS	RGV	VAN	POR	TUL	PHX	RNO	COS	PHX	TUL	SPR	OKC
Seattle Sounders 2 (SEA)	1–2	2–1	0–3	2–1	1–3	2–3	3–2	2–0	0–0	0–6	2–2	3–0	1–3	3–2	3–4	2–0	1–4	1–2	0–2	0–2	1–2	3–4	3–0	2–1	0–1	0–2	1–1	1–1	0–1	0–1	1–2	1–3
Swope Park Rangers KC (SPR)	OKC	POR	SAC	PHX	SLC	VAN	RGV	SAN	SAN	TUL	PHX	COS	TUL	LAG	RGV	VAN	POR	SEA	SPR	STL	OCO	SLC	SAC	RNO	OKC	OCO	SAN	COS	LAG	RGV	OKC	SEA
Swope Park Rangers KC (SPR)	3–1	1–0	1–0	3–4	1–2	3–1	0–1	0–1	0–0	3–1	2–2	2–1	2–1	1–0	4–0	1–0	1–0	2–0	1–4	0–0	1–1	2–2	2–2	0–1	2–0	1–2	5–2	3–1	3–0	2–2	1–4	2–1
Tampa Bay Rowdies (TBR)	ORL	TOR	OTT	LOU	CIN	CHS	RIC	OTT	LOU	TOR	ROC	STL	CLT	ROC	RIC	PIT	CHS	CIN	ORL	CHS	PGH	HAR	STL	OTT	NYR	HAR	CLT	BST	BST	NYR	SAN	ORL
Tampa Bay Rowdies (TBR)	1–0	4–0	1–0	1–2	1–1	2–3	1–0	0–0	2–0	3–1	0–1	1–1	2–2	1–1	1–1	0–2	0–2	2–0	1–1	2–0	2–0	3–0	3–4	1–1	2–4	3–2	1–0	2–2	1–1	3–2	1–1	2–0
Toronto FC II (TOR)	PHX	TBR	ORL	ROC	OTT	LOU	PGH	BST	TBR	RIC	CIN	STL	PGH	ORL	CHS	HAR	OTT	NYR	ROC	OTT	CHS	CLT	BST	RIC	CLT	STL	ROC	NYR	HAR	LOU	BST	CIN
Toronto FC II (TOR)	1–0	0–4	1–3	0–0	1–1	0–0	0–1	0–1	1–3	0–0	0–1	0–2	1–1	1–0	1–6	3–4	1–0	0–1	0–2	0–2	1–0	2–2	1–3	1–2	3–2	1–1	0–1	1–2	1–2	1–0	2–4	3–4
Tulsa Roughnecks FC (TUL)	COS	RGV	SAC	RGV	COS	VAN	OCO	SAC	RNO	POR	SPR	SAN	SPR	SLC	OKC	LAG	PHX	SLC	RNO	STL	OKC	OCO	STL	SEA	POR	VAN	OKC	LAG	SAN	PHX	SEA	COS
Tulsa Roughnecks FC (TUL)	4-1	1–0	1–2	1–0	0–3	3–1	4–0	2–3	0–4	3–1	1–3	1–3	1–2	2–0	2–1	2–2	3–0	0–0	2–3	2–1	2–1	0–0	1–2	1–0	1–1	3–1	0–2	1–0	0–2	3–4	1–0	2–4
Vancouver Whitecaps FC 2 (VAN)	LAG	RNO	SEA	POR	SAN	SAC	SPR	TUL	COS	SLC	POR	PHX	SAC	OKC	SEA	COS	SPR	RNO	OCO	RGV	SAC	SEA	RGV	SAN	LAG	TUL	OKC	OCO	PHX	POR	SLC	OCO
Vancouver Whitecaps FC 2 (VAN)	0–2	1–1	3–0	1–0	1–2	0–0	1–3	1–3	3–1	1–2	1–0	1–2	1–2	2–2	0–2	2–2	0–1	1–1	0–1	3–3	0–1	0–3	1–1	0–1	2–1	1–3	0–0	1–2	0–4	0–1	1–1	3–4

== Playoffs ==
Conference Quarterfinals
October 20 – Louisville Slugger Field
#1 Louisville City FC	4
#8 Bethlehem Steel FC	0
October 21 – Capelli Sport Stadium
#4 Rochester Rhinos (a.e.t.)	2
#5 Charlotte Independence	1
October 21 – Al Lang Stadium
#3 Tampa Bay Rowdies	3
#6 FC Cincinnati	0
October 21 – MUSC Health Stadium
#2 Charleston Battery	0
#7 New York Red Bulls II	4
October 20 – Rio Tinto Stadium
#1 Real Monarchs	1 (1)
#8 Sacramento Republic FC (p)	1 (3)
October 21 – Swope Soccer Village
#4 Swope Park Rangers (p)	1 (4)
#5 Phoenix Rising FC	1 (2)
October 21 – Greater Nevada Field
#3 Reno 1868 FC	0
#6 OKC Energy FC	1
October 21 – Toyota Field
#2 San Antonio FC	2
#7 Tulsa Roughnecks	1

Conference Semifinals
October 28 – Louisville Slugger Field
#1 Louisville City FC	1
#4 Rochester Rhinos	0
October 28 – Al Lang Stadium
#3 Tampa Bay Rowdies	1
#7 New York Red Bulls II (a.e.t.)	2
October 28 – Children's Mercy Park
#8 Sacramento Republic FC	0
#4 Swope Park Rangers	1
October 28 – Toyota Field
#6 OKC Energy FC (p)	1 (4)
#2 San Antonio FC	1 (1)

Conference Finals
November 4 – Louisville Slugger Field
#1 Louisville City FC (p)	1 (4)
#7 New York Red Bulls II	1 (3)
November 4 – Children's Mercy Park
#4 Swope Park Rangers (p)	0 (7)
#6 OKC Energy FC	0 (6)

USL Championship
November 13 – Louisville Slugger Field (ESPNU)
#1 Louisville City FC	1
#4 Swope Park Rangers	0

=== Eastern Conference ===
October 20, 2017 QF	Louisville City FC	4–0	Bethlehem Steel FC	Louisville, Kentucky
7:30 pm EDT	Morad 14', 31'; Spencer 70'; Ownby 79'	Report	Real (yellow card) 57'; Burke (yellow card) 63'; Conneh (yellow card) 75'; Jones (yellow card) 87'	Stadium: Louisville Slugger Field; Attendance: 6,378; Referee: Marcos de Oliveira

October 21, 2017 QF	Rochester Rhinos	2–1 (a.e.t.)	Charlotte Independence	Rochester, New York
6:05 pm EDT	Dover (yellow card) 11'; Graf 53'; François (yellow card) 61'; Farrell (yellow card) 83'; Defregger 113'	Report	A. Martínez (yellow card) 53' (yellow-red card) 120'; E. Martínez 69'; Davidson (yellow card) 85'	Stadium: Capelli Sport Stadium; Attendance: 1,647; Referee: Bardhyl Pashaj

October 21, 2017 QF	Charleston Battery	0–4	New York Red Bulls II	Charleston, South Carolina
7:00 pm EDT	Anunga (yellow card) 57'; Griffith (yellow card) 85'	Report	Bonomo 39'; Kutler 51'; Valot 71'; Flemmings (yellow card) 82'; Mines 84'	Stadium: MUSC Health Stadium; Attendance: 3,410; Referee: Kevin Broadley

October 21, 2017 QF	Tampa Bay Rowdies	3–0	FC Cincinnati	St. Petersburg, Florida
7:30 pm EDT	Schäfer 8', 25'; Hristov (yellow card) 61' (goal) 67'; Cole (yellow card) 84'	Report	McLaughlin (yellow card) 52'; Walker (yellow card) 63'; Berry (yellow card) 90'	Stadium: Al Lang Stadium; Attendance: 6,104; Referee: Malik Badawi

October 28, 2017 SF	Louisville City FC	1–0	Rochester Rhinos	Louisville, Kentucky
7:30 pm EDT	Jimenez (yellow card) 52'; Ownby 77'; Ranjitsingh (yellow card) 90+1'	Report	Felix (yellow card) 55'	Stadium: Louisville Slugger Field; Attendance: 7,117; Referee: Victor Rivas

October 28, 2017 SF	Tampa Bay Rowdies	1–2 (a.e.t.)	New York Red Bulls II	St. Petersburg, Florida
7:30 pm EDT	Hristov 26'; Portillos (yellow card) 35'; Guenzatti (yellow card) 39'; Cole (yellow card) 42'; Pickens (yellow card) 57'; Vingaard (yellow card) 62'; Restrepo (yellow card) 66'; Paterson (yellow card) 116'	Report	Bonomo 58' (pen.), 93'; Flemmings (yellow card) 86'; Ndam (yellow card) 96'	Stadium: Al Lang Stadium; Attendance: 5,119; Referee: Joseph Dickerson

November 4, 2017 F	Louisville City FC	1–1 (a.e.t.) (4–3 p)	New York Red Bulls II	Louisville, Kentucky
7:30 pm EDT	Ownby 12'; Craig (yellow card) 96'	Report	Flemmings 57'	Stadium: Louisville Slugger Field; Attendance: 10,047; Referee: Sorin Stoica
	Penalties
	Smith (penalty scored); DelPiccolo (penalty missed); Totsch (penalty scored); Jimenez (penalty scored); Ballard (penalty scored)		(penalty scored) Bonomo; (penalty scored) Martínez; (penalty scored) Valot; (penalty missed) Mines; (penalty missed) Kutler

=== Western Conference ===
October 20, 2017 QF	Real Monarchs SLC	1–1 (a.e.t.) (1–3 p)	Sacramento Republic FC	Sandy, Utah
7:00 pm MDT	Besler (yellow card) 38'; Lachowecki (yellow card) 82'; Hoffman 86' (pen.)	Report	Kiffe (yellow card) 20'; Espino 49'	Stadium: Rio Tinto Stadium; Attendance: 2,234; Referee: Ramy Touchan
	Penalties
	Cruz (penalty missed); Velásquez (penalty missed); Haber (penalty scored); Hoffman (penalty missed)		(penalty scored) Partain; (penalty scored) Kiffe; (penalty scored) Hall

October 21, 2017 QF	Reno 1868 FC	0–1	OKC Energy FC	Reno, Nevada
5:45 pm PDT	Wehan (yellow card) 32'	Report	Wojcik 41' (yellow card) 90+1'	Stadium: Greater Nevada Field; Attendance: 4,342; Referee: Victor Rivas

October 21, 2017 QF	San Antonio FC	2–1	Tulsa Roughnecks	San Antonio, Texas
7:30 pm CDT	McCarthy (yellow card) 55'; Elizondo 61'; Guzmán 90+4' (pen.)	Report	Gee 23'; Ayala (yellow card) 53'; Levin (yellow card) 90+2'; Rivas (yellow card) 90+2'	Stadium: Toyota Field; Attendance: 7,019; Referee: Timothy Ford

October 21, 2017 QF	Swope Park Rangers	1–1 (a.e.t.) (4–2 p)	Phoenix Rising FC	Kansas City, Missouri
7:30 pm CDT	Didic 109'	Report	Drogba 99'	Stadium: Children's Mercy Victory Field; Attendance: 912; Referee: Guido Gonzales Jr.
	Penalties
	Selbol (penalty scored); Duke (penalty scored); Belmar (penalty scored); Moloto (penalty scored)		(penalty missed) Lambert; (penalty scored) Dia; (penalty scored) Awako; (penalty missed) Mala
Note: Match was postponed due to lightning and heavy rain after the first half, Second half was played the following day.

October 28, 2017 SF	Swope Park Rangers	1–0	Sacramento Republic FC	Kansas City, Kansas
4:00 pm CDT	Maher (yellow card) 39'; Belmar 46'	Report	Kiffe (yellow card) 41'; Ochoa (yellow card) 67'	Stadium: Children's Mercy Park; Attendance: 1,248; Referee: Ramy Touchan
Note: Match was moved to Papa Murphy's Park due to challenges at Children's Mercy Victory Field. Then it was switched again to Children's Mercy Park.

October 28, 2017 SF	San Antonio FC	1–1 (a.e.t.) (1–4 p)	OKC Energy FC	San Antonio, Texas
8:30 pm CDT	Elizondo 7' (yellow card) 97'; Gordon (yellow card) 51'; Castillo (yellow card) 112'	Report	R. Dixon (yellow card) 72'; Wojcik 85'	Stadium: Toyota Field; Attendance: 7,032; Referee: Guido Gonzales Jr.
	Penalties
	Guzmán (penalty missed); Castillo (penalty scored); Reed (penalty missed)		(penalty scored) Angulo; (penalty scored) Brown; (penalty scored) Hyland; (penalty scored) Wallace

November 4, 2017 F	Swope Park Rangers	0–0 (a.e.t.) (7–6 p)	OKC Energy FC	Kansas City, Kansas
7:30 pm CDT	Didic (yellow card) 53'	Report	Barril (yellow card) 79'; Daly (yellow card) 90+3'; Wojcik (yellow card) 113'	Stadium: Children's Mercy Park; Attendance: 3,012; Referee: Robert Sibiga
	Penalties
	Selbol (penalty scored); Duke (penalty missed); Belmar (penalty scored); Moloto (penalty missed); Hernandez (penalty missed); Barnathan (penalty scored); Storm (penalty scored); Musa (penalty scored); Didic (penalty missed); Maher (penalty scored); Zendejas (penalty scored)		(penalty missed) Angulo; (penalty scored) Brown; (penalty missed) Hyland; (penalty missed) Wallace; (penalty scored) González; (penalty scored) Gonzalez; (penalty scored) Daly; (penalty scored) Wojcik; (penalty missed) Bond; (penalty scored) Fink; (penalty missed) Cochran

=== USL Championship ===
November 13, 2017	Louisville City FC	1–0	Swope Park Rangers	Louisville, Kentucky
8:00 pm EDT	Lancaster 88'; Kaye (yellow card) 90+3'; McCabe (red card) 90+8'	Report; Report	Musa (yellow card) 17'; Didic (yellow card) 24'	Stadium: Louisville Slugger Field; Attendance: 14,456; Referee: Jose Carlos Rivero
Note: Niall McCabe was sent off from the bench

Championship Game MVP: (United States) Paolo DelPiccolo (LOU)

== Attendance ==
=== Average home attendances ===
Ranked from highest to lowest average attendance.

Team	GP	Total	High	Low	Average
FC Cincinnati	16	339,164	30,417	15,227	21,198
Sacramento Republic FC	16	185,104	11,569	11,569	11,569
Louisville City FC	16	137,801	13,812	6,698	8,613
San Antonio FC	16	114,433	8,131	6,037	7,152
Rio Grande Valley FC	16	113,076	8,866	5,481	7,067
Phoenix Rising FC	16	98,028	7,162	4,536	6,127
Tampa Bay Rowdies	16	94,306	7,786	4,326	5,894
Reno 1868 FC	16	88,950	7,092	4,418	5,559
Ottawa Fury FC	16	86,839	7,780	3,024	5,427
Richmond Kickers	16	74,636	8,021	1,567	4,665
Saint Louis FC	16	73,139	5,725	4,001	4,571
Oklahoma City Energy FC	16	68,685	6,059	2,650	4,293
Tulsa Roughnecks FC	16	61,619	5,647	3,015	3,851
Colorado Springs Switchbacks FC	16	54,222	4,437	1,482	3,389
Charleston Battery	16	50,670	6,563	2,015	3,167
Bethlehem Steel FC	16	48,837	3,210	2,881	3,052
Pittsburgh Riverhounds	16	42,975	4,006	950	2,686
Real Monarchs	16	41,235	8,402	1,771	2,577
Orange County SC	16	41,195	4,963	1,539	2,575
Portland Timbers 2	16	40,386	7,277	1,226	2,524
Harrisburg City Islanders	16	38,863	3,367	1,806	2,429
Rochester Rhinos	16	32,498	3,459	963	2,031
Charlotte Independence	16	25,843	2,648	801	1,615
LA Galaxy II	16	19,436	3,000	432	1,215
Orlando City B	16	18,867	2,741	791	1,179
Toronto FC II	16	17,420	3,582	143	1,089
Seattle Sounders FC 2	16	16,530	1,307	951	1,033
Swope Park Rangers	16	16,237	1,114	572	1,015
Vancouver Whitecaps FC 2	16	13,899	1,788	403	869
New York Red Bulls II	16	10,113	1,482	271	632
Total	480	2,065,006	30,417	143	4,302

Updated to games of October 15, 2017
Sources: USL

== Statistical leaders ==
=== Top scorers ===
Rank	Player	Nation	Club	Goals
1	Dane Kelly	JAM	Reno 1868 FC	18
2	Chandler Hoffman	USA	Real Monarchs SLC	16
2	Enzo Martinez	URU	Charlotte Independence	16
4	José Angulo	COL	Oklahoma City Energy	15
4	Romario Williams	JAM	Charleston Battery	15
6	Kharlton Belmar	GRN	Swope Park Rangers	14
6	Corey Hertzog	USA	Pittsburgh Riverhounds	14
8	Georgi Hristov	BUL	Tampa Bay Rowdies	13
8	Jason Johnson	JAM	Phoenix Rising FC	13
10	Djiby Fall	SEN	FC Cincinnati	12
10	Kevaughn Frater	JAM	Colorado Springs Switchbacks	12
10	Jorge Herrera	COL	Charlotte Independence	12
10	Antoine Hoppenot	FRA	Reno 1868 FC	12

=== Top assists ===
Rank	Player	Nation	Club	Assists
1	Chris Wehan	USA	Reno 1868 FC	12
2	Vincent Bezecourt	FRA	New York Red Bulls II	11
2	Marcel Schäfer	GER	Tampa Bay Rowdies	11
4	Maikel Chang	CUB	Charleston Battery	10
4	Irvin Parra	USA	Orange County SC	10
6	Charlie Adams	ENG	Real Monarchs SLC	8
6	Justin Bilyeu	USA	Rio Grande Valley	8
6	Juan Pablo Caffa	ARG	Tulsa Roughnecks FC	8
6	Billy Forbes	TCA	San Antonio FC	8
6	Adam Najem	AFG	Bethlehem Steel FC	8
6	Josh Suggs	USA	Colorado Springs Switchbacks	8

=== Shutouts ===
Rank	Player	Nation	Club	Shutouts
1	Diego Restrepo	USA	San Antonio FC	12
2	Tomas Gomez	USA	Rochester Rhinos	11
3	Odisnel Cooper	CUB	Charleston Battery	10
4	Matt Bersano	USA	Reno 1868 FC	9
4	Fabián Cerda	CHI	Tulsa Roughnecks	9
4	Earl Edwards Jr.	USA	Orlando City B	9
4	Matt Pickens	USA	Tampa Bay Rowdies	9
8	Josh Cohen	USA	Phoenix Rising FC	8
8	Greg Ranjitsingh	TRI	Louisville City FC	8
8	Adrian Zendejas	USA	Swope Park Rangers	8

=== Hat-tricks ===
Player	Nation	Club	Against	Result	Date
Djiby Fall	SEN	FC Cincinnati	Saint Louis FC	4–0	April 15
Dane Kelly	JAM	Reno 1868 FC	Phoenix Rising FC	4–0	May 6
Dane Kelly	JAM	Reno 1868 FC	Seattle Sounders FC 2	6–0	May 20
Trevin Caesar	TRI	Sacramento Republic	Rio Grande Valley FC	6–2	June 21
Jorge Herrera	COL	Charlotte Independence	Saint Louis FC	5–1	July 8
Enzo Martínez	URU	Charlotte Independence	Louisville City FC	3–1	August 5
Lindo Mfeka	RSA	Reno 1868 FC	Oklahoma City Energy	3–0	September 20
José Angulo	COL	Oklahoma City Energy	LA Galaxy II	3–0	October 1
Stefano Bonomo	USA	New York Red Bulls II	Orlando City B	6–5	October 7

Scored four goals.

== League awards ==
=== Individual awards ===
- Most Valuable Player: (Jamaica) Dane Kelly (RNO)
- Rookie of the Year: (United States) Chris Wehan (RNO)
- Defender of the Year: (United States) Sebastien Ibeagha (SAN)
- Goalkeeper of the Year: (United States) Diego Restrepo (SAN)
- Coach of the Year: (England) Mark Briggs (SLC)

=== All-League Teams ===
First Team

F: (United States) Chandler Hoffman (SLC), (Jamaica) Dane Kelly (RNO), (Uruguay) Enzo Martinez (CLT)
M: (Germany) Marcel Schäfer (TBR), (Colombia) Sebastian Velasquez (SLC), (United States) Chris Wehan (RNO)
D: (England) Paco Craig (LOU), (Australia) Harrison Delbridge (CIN), (United States) Sebastien Ibeagha (SAN), (United States) Forrest Lasso (CHS)
G: (United States) Diego Restrepo (SAN)

Second Team

F: (Argentina) Juan Pablo Caffa (TUL), (United States) Corey Hertzog (PIT), (Jamaica) Romario Williams (CHS)
M: (France) Vincent Bezecourt (NYRB), (Turks and Caicos Islands) Billy Forbes (SAN), (United States) Justin Portillo (CHS)
D: (United States) Ryan Felix (ROC), (United States) James Kiffe (SAC), (United States) Taylor Mueller (CHS), (United States) Jimmy Ockford (RNO)
G: (United States) Earl Edwards Jr. (ORL)

Month	USL Player of the Month			
Month	Player	Club	Position	Reason
April	(Turks and Caicos Islands) Billy Forbes	San Antonio FC	Midfielder	6G 3A
May	(Jamaica) Dane Kelly	Reno 1868 FC	Forward	8G 2 Hat Tricks
June	(Jamaica) Romario Williams	Charleston Battery	Forward	5G
July	(Colombia) Jorge Herrera	Charlotte Independence	Forward	8G 2A
August	(United States) Earl Edwards Jr.	Orlando City B	Goalkeeper	3 Shutouts
September	(United States) Josh Cohen	Phoenix Rising FC	Goalkeeper	6 Shutouts in 8 games
October	(Colombia) José Angulo	Oklahoma City Energy	Forward	6G 3A

Week	USL Player of the Week			
Week	Player	Club	Position	Reason
1	(United States) Corey Hertzog	Pittsburgh Riverhounds	Forward	2G
2	(United States) Christian Volesky	Saint Louis FC	Forward	1G 1A
3	(Liberia) Seku Conneh	Bethlehem Steel FC	Forward	2G
4	(Senegal) Djiby Fall	FC Cincinnati	Forward	4G vs. St. Louis
5	(Uruguay) Enzo Martínez	Charlotte Independence	Forward	2G
6	(Costa Rica) César Elizondo	San Antonio FC	Forward	2G 1A
7	(Jamaica) Dane Kelly	Reno 1868 FC	Forward	Hat Trick vs. Phoenix
8	(United States) Ian Svantesson	Tulsa Roughnecks FC	Forward	4G
9	(Jamaica) Dane Kelly	Reno 1868 FC	Forward	Hat Trick vs. Seattle
10	(France) Antoine Hoppenot	Reno 1868 FC	Midfielder	3G
11	(United States) Irvin Parra	Seattle Sounders FC 2	Midfielder	2G 1A
12	(Jamaica) Kevaughn Frater	Colorado Springs Switchbacks	Forward	2G GWG
13	(England) Cameron Lancaster	Louisville City FC	Forward	2G
14	(Trinidad and Tobago) Trevin Caesar	Sacramento Republic FC	Forward	4G Hat Trick vs. Rio Grande Valley
15	(Brazil) Pedro Ribeiro	Harrisburg City Islanders	Forward	2G 1A
16	(Colombia) Jorge Herrera	Charlotte Independence	Forward	5G Hat Trick vs. St. Louis
17	(Jamaica) Jason Johnson	Phoenix Rising FC	Forward	2G vs. Colorado Springs
18	(Mexico) Miguel González	Oklahoma City Energy	Midfielder	2G 1A
19	(United States) Kendall McIntosh	Portland Timbers 2	Goalkeeper	2 PK Saves
20	(Uruguay) Enzo Martínez	Charlotte Independence	Forward	Hat Trick vs. Louisville
21	(United States) Luke Spencer	Louisville City FC	Forward	1G 2A
22	(Guinea) Hadji Barry	Orlando City B	Forward	3G
23	(Scotland) Kevin Kerr	Pittsburgh Riverhounds	Midfielder	1G 2A
24	(Uruguay) Enzo Martínez	Charlotte Independence	Forward	2G
25	(Lesotho) Sunny Jane	Richmond Kickers	Midfielder	1G 1A
26	(United States) Kenney Walker	FC Cincinnati	Midfielder	1G 2A
27	(South Africa) Lindo Mfeka	Reno 1868 FC	Midfielder	4G Hat Trick vs. Oklahoma City
28	(Colombia) José Angulo	Oklahoma City Energy	Forward	Hat Trick vs. LA Galaxy II
29	(United States) Stefano Bonomo	New York Red Bulls II	Forward	4G Hat Trick vs. Orlando
30	(Mexico) Éver Guzmán	San Antonio FC	Forward	3G 1A
