= Roman Knox =

American soccer player

Personal information
- Date of birth: November 25, 1999 (age 26)
- Place of birth: Kansas City, Missouri, United States
- Height: 1.77 m (5 ft 10 in)
- Position: Attacking midfielder

Team information
- Current team: SMU Mustangs
- Number: 8

Youth career
- 2011–2018: Sporting Kansas City

College career
Years	Team	Apps	(Gls)
2018–2019	North Carolina Tar Heels	1	(0)
2020–2022	SMU Mustangs	28	(2)

Senior career*
Years	Team	Apps	(Gls)
2018	Swope Park Rangers	7	(0)
- * Club domestic league appearances and goals as of April 1, 2023

Roman Knox (born November 25, 1999) is an American soccer player who plays for the SMU Mustangs.

== Career ==
Knox played with United Soccer League side Swope Park Rangers during their 2018 season from Sporting Kansas City's academy. He made his first professional appearance on June 2, 2018, as a 67th-minute substitute during a 2–0 loss to Saint Louis FC.

Knox has declared he will join the University of North Carolina at Chapel Hill later in 2018 to play college soccer.

In 2021, Knox transferred from North Carolina to Southern Methodist University.
