= Luis Espino =

Mexican footballer (born 1997)

Personal information
- Full name: Luis Fernando Espino Vazquez
- Date of birth: 4 January 1997 (age 29)
- Place of birth: Torreón, Coahuila, Mexico
- Height: 5 ft 4 in (1.63 m)
- Position: Midfielder

Youth career
- CESIFUT Academy

Senior career*
Years	Team	Apps	(Gls)
2015–2016	Tuzos UAZ	12	(2)
2017	Club Atlas Premier	9	(0)
2017–2018	Sacramento Republic	28	(3)
- * Club domestic league appearances and goals as of 17 October 2018

Luis Fernando Espino Vazquez (Note: In this Spanish name, the first or paternal surname is Espino and the second or maternal family name is Vazquez.) (born 4 January 1997) is a Mexican footballer who plays as a midfielder.

== Career ==
After time in Mexico with Universidad Autónoma de Zacatecas and Club Atlas Premier, Espino moved to United Soccer League side Sacramento Republic on 14 September 2017.
