= Universidad Autónoma de Zacatecas FC =

U.A.Z.F.C
- Full name: Universidad Autónoma de Zacatecas FC
- Nickname: Tuzos UAZ
- Founded: August 17, 2006
- Ground: Estadio Universitario Unidad Deportiva NorteZacatecas, Zacatecas
- Capacity: 5,000
- Chairman: (Mexico) Alfredo Femat Bañuelos
- Manager: (Mexico) Jorge Enrique Medina
- League: Segunda División de México
Home colours	Away colours

Universidad Autónoma de Zacatecas FC is a Mexican football club. They reside in Zacatecas, Zacatecas. The club currently places in the Segunda División de México and would not be eligible for promotion, since the club does not count with a stadium with a capacity of 15,000. The clubs represents the Autonomous University of Zacatecas.

== Current roster ==
- Updated on August 29, 2011.

Note: Flags indicate national team as defined under FIFA eligibility rules; some limited exceptions apply. Players may hold more than one non-FIFA nationality.

No.	Pos.	Nation	Player
1	GK	MEX	Manuel de Jesús Villareal
2	DF	MEX	David Alejandro Vega
3	DF	MEX	Aldo Manuel Rosales
5	MF	MEX	Francisco Javier Ruiz
6	MF	MEX	Escamilla Herrera José Ramiro
7	MF	MEX	Maldonado Ríos Ricardo
8	MF	MEX	Robles César Vazquez
9	DF	MEX	Rubén Darío Ruiz
10	MF	MEX	Michel Angelo Esparza
11	FW	MEX	Irwin Alexis Castanon
12	FW	MEX	Juan Francisco Silva

No.	Pos.	Nation	Player
12	DF	MEX	Juan Francisco Silva
14	FW	MEX	Antonio de Jesús
15	MF	MEX	Edgar Humberto Frausto
16	MF	MEX	Gerardo Solis Aguilar
17	MF	MEX	Francisco Javier Garcia
18	FW	MEX	Alfonso Rivera
19	FW	MEX	Jorge Alberto Ramirez
21	GK	MEX	Mario Alberto
23	MF	MEX	Walther Leonardo
26	FW	MEX	Erick Mauricio Saucedo
34	MF	MEX	Edson Gerardo Del Rio
