= Adrian Zendejas =

American soccer player (born 1995)

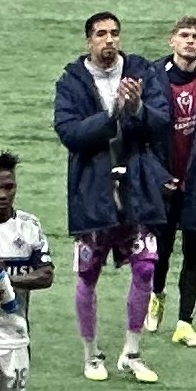
- Zendejas in 2026

Personal information
- Full name: Adrián Zendejas Rodríguez
- Date of birth: August 30, 1995 (age 31)
- Place of birth: Chula Vista, California, United States
- Height: 1.95 m (6 ft 5 in)
- Position: Goalkeeper

Team information
- Current team: Vancouver Whitecaps FC
- Number: 30

Youth career
- 2008–2011: Nomads SC
- 2012–2013: San Diego Surf
- 2014–2016: Tijuana

Senior career*
Years	Team	Apps	(Gls)
2016	Swope Park Rangers	5	(0)
2017–2019	Sporting Kansas City	1	(0)
2017–2019	→ Swope Park Rangers (loan)	42	(0)
2020	Nashville SC	0	(0)
2020–2021	Minnesota United	0	(0)
2021	→ El Paso Locomotive (loan)	3	(0)
2022–2023	Charlotte FC	0	(0)
2022	→ Charlotte Independence (loan)	23	(0)
2023	→ Miami FC (loan)	22	(0)
2024	Skövde AIK	27	(0)
2025–	Vancouver Whitecaps FC	0	(0)
2025–	Whitecaps FC 2	0	(0)
- * Club domestic league appearances and goals as of 14 February 2025

Adrián Zendejas Rodríguez (born August 30, 1995) is an American professional soccer player who plays as a goalkeeper for the Vancouver Whitecaps FC.

== Career ==
=== Youth ===
Zendejas grew up playing with Nomads SC and San Diego Surf of the U.S. Soccer Development Academy, and for Hilltop High School, before joining the under-20s of Liga MX side Tijuana.

=== Professional ===
On June 30, 2016, Zendejas signed with United Soccer League side Swope Park Rangers. He went 8-0-0 in his first eight starts. In helping Rangers to the USL Cup Final, he had a 0.36 goals against average and 0.87 save percentage, both ranking best in the USL among all goalkeepers with at least eight appearances.

In December 2016, Zendejas signed a Major League Soccer contract with Sporting Kansas City. He began the 2017 MLS season as backup to Tim Melia, before re-joining Rangers on loan from Sporting KC. In 25 USL appearances, he had 10 shutouts and a goals-against-average of 0.91, again regarded as one of USL's top goalkeepers. In the USL Cup Playoffs against OKC Energy, after making two saves in regulation, one save in extra time, and four saves in the penalty shootout, Zendejas himself scored the game-winning penalty kick that sent Swope Park to the USL Cup Final again.

In 2018, Zendejas split time between starting on loan at Swope Park in USL and backing up Tim Melia in MLS. On June 6, Zendejas made his Sporting KC debut in the fourth round of the U.S. Open Cup, shutting out Real Salt Lake over 90 minutes in a 2–0 victory. On June 18, he went 90 minutes again for Sporting KC in the Open Cup, in the Round of 16 against FC Dallas, notching five saves in a 3–2 victory.

On November 19, 2019, Zendejas was traded to Nashville SC in exchange for $125,000 of Targeted Allocation Money and $50,000 of General Allocation Money.

On September 18, 2020, Zendejas was traded again, this time to Minnesota United in exchange for a fourth round 2021 MLS SuperDraft pick and up to $100,000 in General Allocation Money if he meets certain performance-based metrics for Minnesota.

On May 21, 2021, Minnesota loaned Zendejas to El Paso Locomotive of the USL Championship.

On January 16, 2022, Zendejas joined Charlotte FC as a free agent ahead of their inaugural season in MLS.

On January 17, 2023, Zendejas was loaned to USL Championship side Miami FC. He was released by Charlotte following their 2023 season.

In March 2024, Zendejas joined Swedish Superettan club Skövde AIK on a contract until the end of the 2024 season with the option for an extension.

On the 14th of February 2025, Zendejas signed with the Vancouver Whitecaps in the MLS. He signed on a contract for the 2025 season, with a club option for 2026.

=== International ===
Zendejas is eligible to play for the United States due to his birth and upbringing in Chula Vista, California, and for Mexico through parentage. He has expressed an interest in representing the United States.

== Career statistics ==
=== Club ===
As of match played August 25, 2019

Appearances and goals by club, season and competition
Club	Season	League			National cup		Continental		Other		Total	
Club	Season	Division	Apps	Goals	Apps	Goals	Apps	Goals	Apps	Goals	Apps	Goals
Swope Park Rangers	2016	USL	5	0	—		—		4 (Note: Appearances in USL Championship Playoffs)	0	9	0
Sporting Kansas City	2017	MLS	0	0	1	0	—		—		1	0
Sporting Kansas City	2018	MLS	0	0	2	0	—		—		2	0
Sporting Kansas City	2019	MLS	1	0	1	0	1 (Note: Appearances in CONCACAF Champions League)	0	—		3	0
Sporting Kansas City	Total		1	0	4	0	1	0	0	0	6	0
Swope Park Rangers (loan)	2017	USL	22	0	—		—		3	0	25	0
Swope Park Rangers (loan)	2018	USL	12	0	—		—		—		12	0
Swope Park Rangers (loan)	2019	USLC	8	0	—		—		—		9	0
Swope Park Rangers (loan)	Total		47	0	0	0	0	0	7	0	45	0
Nashville SC	2020	MLS	0	0	—		—		—		0	0
Minnesota United	2020	MLS	0	0	—		—		—		0	0
Career total			48	0	4	0	1	0	7	0	60	0
