= Amer Didić =

Canadian soccer player (born 1994)

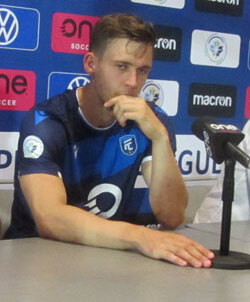
- Didić in 2019

Personal information
- Date of birth: December 28, 1994 (age 31)
- Place of birth: Zenica, Bosnia and Herzegovina
- Height: 1.93 m (6 ft 4 in)
- Position: Centre-back

Team information
- Current team: Cavalry FC

Youth career
- Sherwood Park SA
- FC Edmonton

College career
Years	Team	Apps	(Gls)
2012–2015	Baker Wildcats	80	(28)

Senior career*
Years	Team	Apps	(Gls)
2016–2017	Swope Park Rangers	34	(1)
2016	→ Sporting Kansas City (loan)	0	(0)
2017–2018	Sporting Kansas City	0	(0)
2017–2018	→ Swope Park Rangers (loan)	40	(2)
2019	San Antonio FC	2	(0)
2019–2021	FC Edmonton	46	(3)
2022–2023	Pacific FC	50	(6)
2024–2025	Atlético Ottawa	31	(4)
2026–	Cavalry FC	26	(4)

International career^{‡}
2015	Canada Universiade	3	(0)
2017	Canada U23	2	(0)
2020	Canada	2	(1)
- * Club domestic league appearances and goals as of October 25, 2026 ‡ National team caps and goals as of January 15, 2020

Amer Didić (born December 28, 1994) is a professional soccer player who plays as a centre-back for Cavalry FC in the Canadian Premier League.

== Club career ==
=== Early career ===
Born in Zenica, Bosnia and Herzegovina, and raised in Edmonton, Alberta, Canada, Didić began playing soccer with Sherwood Park District SA and later spent time in the FC Edmonton Academy system before playing four years of college soccer at Baker University, where he was a two-time NAIA All-American. As a senior in 2015, he was named a NSCAA and NAIA All-American, as well as being named the Heart of America Athletic Conference Most Valuable Player.

=== Swope Park Rangers ===
Didić was signed by United Soccer League side Swope Park Rangers on March 2, 2016. In August 2016, Sporting Kansas City announced that they had signed Didić on a short-term loan, to play in the 2016-17 CONCACAF Champions League against Central FC. Didić made his first team debut on August 16, 2016 in the competition. After receiving rave reviews in his first season with Swope Park Rangers, Didić was named to the 2016 USL All-League First Team.

=== Sporting Kansas City ===
In May 2017, after six games with Swope Park in 2017, Didić was signed by Sporting Kansas City for the remainder of the 2017 season, with options for 2018, 2019 and 2020. This made him the first Baker Wildcats soccer player to sign with an MLS club. He remained on loan with Swope Park for the remainder of the season. Upon conclusion of the 2017 season, Sporting KC announced they would exercise Didic's option for the 2018 season. Didić made his first appearance for Sporting KC since the 2016 season when he started in a 2–0 victory over Real Salt Lake at Rio Tinto Stadium in the U.S. Open Cup Round of 32 on June 6, 2018. After three seasons with Sporting KC, Didić was released at the end of the 2018 season.

=== San Antonio FC ===
In December 2018, Didić signed with United Soccer League club San Antonio FC for the 2019 season. After starting the first two matches of the season on March 9 and 16, Didić was relegated to the bench for the following two games before being left out of the matchday 18 in April. On April 15, 2019, Didić and San Antonio agreed to mutually terminate his contract so that he could pursue other opportunities.

=== FC Edmonton ===
Right after his departure from San Antonio, Didić signed with his hometown club, Canadian Premier League side FC Edmonton. That season, he made nineteen league appearances and one appearance in the Canadian Championship. While out of contract during the off-season, Didić went on a preseason trial with Major League Soccer side Vancouver Whitecaps FC. On February 24, 2020, he concluded his trial with Vancouver and returned home. On March 2, 2020, Didić officially re-signed with Edmonton for the 2020 season.

=== Pacific FC ===
On February 9, 2022, Didić signed with CPL reigning champions Pacific FC on a free transfer. He left the club at the end of the 2023 season, having made a total amount of 63 appearances in all competitions for them.

=== Atlético Ottawa ===
On April 4, 2024, Atlético Ottawa announced the signing of the Canadian international, ahead of the 2024 Canadian Premier League season. Didić joined on a free transfer and signed a one-year contract with an option to extend for another season. On April 13, 2024, he made his debut in the season opener against York United FC. On 3 May 2025, Didić suffered a serious injury during a match against Pacific FC. Shortly after, it was announced he had undergone a successful surgery for a right leg fracture, and would be unavailable for multiple months.

=== Cavalry FC ===
In January 2026, he signed with Cavalry FC in the Canadian Premier League on a two year contract, with an option for 2028.

== International career ==
Didić represented the Canadian Interuniversity Sport team at the Universiade in South Korea in 2015.

In March 2017, Didić received his first Canadian youth national team call-up for an under-23 tournament in Qatar. In September of that year, he also received his first senior team call-up for a friendly against Jamaica, but did not appear in the match.

He was recalled to the national team in October 2019 for a CONCACAF Nations League match against the United States.

On January 10, 2020, he made his debut and scored his first goal against Barbados.

== Personal life ==
When he was a toddler, Didić and his family emigrated to Canada in the wake of the Bosnian War, eventually settling in Edmonton, Alberta.

== Career statistics ==
=== Club ===
As of November 21, 2026

Appearances and goals by club, season and competition
Club	Season	League			Playoffs		National Cup		Continental		Total	
Club	Season	Division	Apps	Goals	Apps	Goals	Apps	Goals	Apps	Goals	Apps	Goals
Swope Park Rangers	2016	USL	28	1	4	0	–		–		32	1
Swope Park Rangers	2017	USL	21	1	4	1	–		–		25	2
Swope Park Rangers	2018	USL	25	1	2	0	–		–		27	1
Swope Park Rangers	Total		74	3	10	1	0	0	0	0	84	4
Sporting Kansas City	2016	Major League Soccer	0	0	0	0	0	0	3	0	3	0
Sporting Kansas City	2017	Major League Soccer	0	0	0	0	0	0	–		0	0
Sporting Kansas City	2018	Major League Soccer	0	0	0	0	1	0	–		1	0
Sporting Kansas City	Total		0	0	0	0	1	0	3	0	4	0
San Antonio FC	2019	USL Championship	2	0	–		0	0	–		2	0
FC Edmonton	2019	Canadian Premier League	19	0	–		1	0	–		20	0
FC Edmonton	2020	Canadian Premier League	3	0	–		–		–		3	0
FC Edmonton	2021	Canadian Premier League	24	3	–		1	0	–		25	3
FC Edmonton	Total		46	3	0	0	2	0	0	0	48	3
Pacific FC	2022	Canadian Premier League	26	2	2	0	1	2	4	0	33	4
Pacific FC	2023	Canadian Premier League	24	4	3	0	3	0	–		30	4
Pacific FC	Total		50	6	5	0	4	0	4	0	63	8
Atlético Ottawa	2024	Canadian Premier League	27	4	2	0	3	0	–		32	4
Atlético Ottawa	2025	Canadian Premier League	4	0	0	0	1	0	–		5	0
Atlético Ottawa	Total		31	4	2	0	4	0	0	0	37	4
Cavalry FC	2026	CPL	26	4	3	0	3	0	0	0	32	4
Career total			229	20	20	1	14	2	7	0	270	23

=== International ===
As of January 16, 2020

Appearances and goals by national team and year
National team	Year	Apps	Goals
Canada	2020	2	1
Total		2	1

As of match played 10 January 2020
Scores and results list Canada's goal tally first, score column indicates score after each Didić goal.

List of international goals scored by Amer Didić
No.	Date	Venue	Cap	Opponent	Score	Result	Competition
1	10 January 2020	Championship Soccer Stadium, Irvine, United States	1	Barbados	3–0	4–1	Friendly

== Honours ==
=== Club ===
Atlético Ottawa

- Canadian Premier League: 2025

=== Individual ===
- NAIA All-American: 2014, 2015
- HAAC Most Valuable Player: 2015
- NSCAA All-American: 2015
- USL All-League First Team: 2016
