= James Musa =

New Zealand footballer (born 1992)

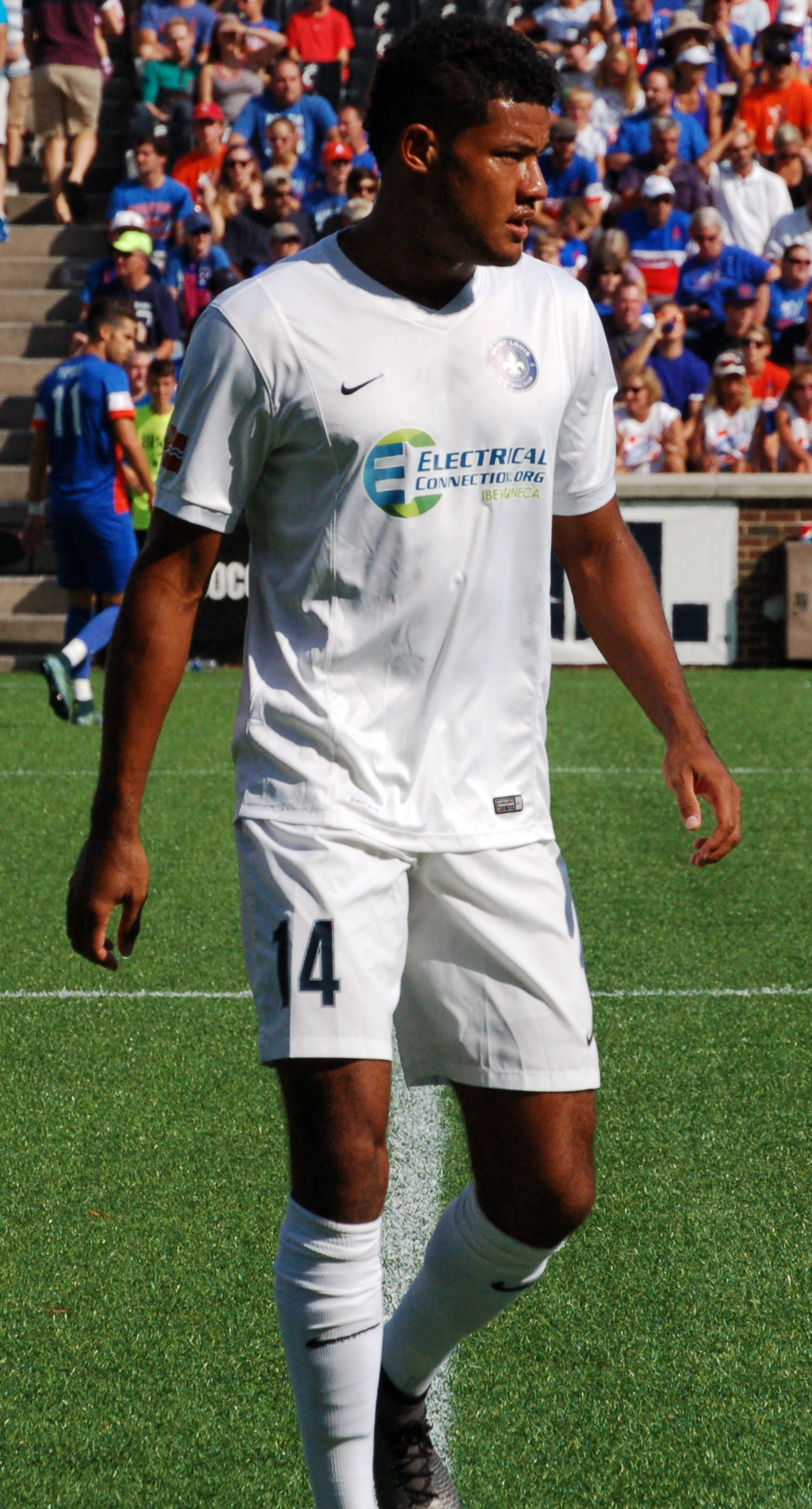
- Musa with Saint Louis in 2016

Personal information
- Full name: James Mzamo Musa
- Date of birth: 1 April 1992 (age 34)
- Place of birth: Plymouth, England
- Height: 1.83 m (6 ft 0 in)
- Positions: Defensive midfielder; centre back

Team information
- Current team: Fort Wayne FC
- Number: 41

Youth career
- 2010: Wellington Phoenix
- 2012–2013: Fulham

Senior career*
Years	Team	Apps	(Gls)
2010–2011	Wellington Phoenix	3	(0)
2011–2012	Team Wellington	17	(1)
2012–2013	Fulham	0	(0)
2013	→ Hereford United (loan)	15	(0)
2013–2014	Team Wellington	15	(0)
2014	South Melbourne	28	(1)
2014–2015	Team Wellington	7	(0)
2015	Saint Louis FC	25	(2)
2015–2016	Team Wellington	6	(3)
2016	Saint Louis FC	28	(3)
2017	Swope Park Rangers	21	(0)
2017	Sporting Kansas City	1	(0)
2017	→ Swope Park Rangers (loan)	3	(0)
2018–2019	Phoenix Rising	55	(2)
2020	Minnesota United FC	6	(0)
2021–2022	Phoenix Rising	51	(3)
2023–2024	Colorado Springs Switchbacks	20	(0)
2024–2025	Indy Eleven	43	(3)
2026–	Fort Wayne FC	23	(1)

International career^{‡}
2011–2012	New Zealand U20	10	(3)
2012	New Zealand U23	10	(2)
2014–	New Zealand	3	(0)
- * Club domestic league appearances and goals as of 28 October 2026 ‡ National team caps and goals as of 8 October 2024

James Mzamo Musa (born 1 April 1992) is a professional footballer who plays as a defender for USL League One club Fort Wayne FC. Born in England, Musa represents New Zealand at the international level.

== Early life ==
Born in Plymouth, England, of South African Xhosa, Zimbabwean Shona and Afrikaner descent, Musa and his family moved to New Zealand in 1999. Musa described New Zealand as "a good place to grow up", he still visits family in Zimbabwe.

== Club career ==
=== Wellington Phoenix (2010 – 2011) ===
Scouted by the Phoenix as one of the club's mandatory Under-21 players, Musa, a schoolboy at Wanganui High School, signed a professional contract with the Wellington outfit in June 2010 prior to the start of the 2010-11 A-League season.

Musa made his first team début on 27 November 2010 at home against Melbourne Victory, a game he started at left back in place of the suspended Ben Sigmund. It made him the 50th player to take the field for the Phoenix and also their 3rd youngest debutant behind Kosta Barbarouses and Marco Rojas. Following the 2010/11 A-League season, Musa was released from the Phoenix.

=== Waitakere City (2011) ===
Musa signed for Waitakere City in the Northern League, New Zealand in June 2011 to help prepare himself before the 2011 FIFA U-20 World Cup

Following a successful 2011 FIFA U-20 World Cup for the New Zealand U-20 team, he was linked with Bradford City in England. Despite early reports that Musa had signed a two-year deal with the Bantams, the deal fell through when the manager, Peter Jackson offered his resignation to the club.

In 2012 Musa again played for Waitakere City where he was able to get competitive games before the 2012 Summer Olympics in London.

=== Team Wellington (2011 – 2012) ===
On 20 October 2011 Musa signed for Team Wellington to play in the ASB Premiership. He scored his first goal for the club in a 3–2 last gasp win against Waikato FC on 5 February 2012.

Musa helped Team Wellington to a 4th-place finish in the league where they went on to beat league winners Auckland City FC in a two leg semi-final 1–0 at home and 4–1 away to secure a place in the ASB Premiership Grand Final against Waitakere United where they succumbed to a 4–1 loss at Trusts Stadium, Auckland.

=== Fulham (2012 – 2013) ===
Following a substitute appearance for the New Zealand U-23 team at the London 2012 Olympic Games against Egypt at Old Trafford, Musa was approached by English Premier League club Fulham for a trial.

After a successful trial, Musa put pen to paper and signed for Fulham on 31 August 2012. He joined on a one-year deal with an additional year option. A week after joining Fulham, Musa was quickly able to adapt at Fulham

==== Loan to Hereford United (2013) ====
It was confirmed on 4 January 2013 that James would go on a one-month loan to Conference National club Hereford United to gain first-team experience. On 30 January 2013, his loan was extended by a further month, and this was later extended again until 4 April 2013. On 26 March 2013, Musa returned to Fulham due to illness.

Musa was one of twelve players released by Fulham at the end of the 2012–2013 Premier League season. After being released by the club, Musa was linked with Scottish Premiership side Hearts.

=== Team Wellington and South Melbourne (2013 – 2015) ===
After leaving Fulham, Musa returned to New Zealand, where he joined Team Wellington for the second time.

Musa signed for South Melbourne of the National Premier Leagues Victoria in Australia on 7 March 2014, and joined them following his sides 1–0 loss to Auckland City FC in the ASB Premiership grand final on 16 March 2014. The 1–0 loss to Auckland City FC was Musa's second successive defeat in the ASB Premiership grand final having previously lost to Waitakere United in 2012.

=== Saint Louis FC (2015) ===
On 25 February 2015 Musa signed with USL expansion club Saint Louis FC. Head coach Dale Schilly is quoted as saying "At 22 years old, James brings loads of experience to Saint Louis FC...His experiences with Fulham and the New Zealand National Team have helped shape him into a top player. He has demonstrated very good defending instincts, is good in the air, and possesses sound open-field defending and tracking."

=== Return to Team Wellington (2015 – 2016) ===
In November 2015, he returned to ASB Premiership to play for Team Wellington during the USL offseason.

=== Return to Saint Louis FC (2016) ===
Musa returned to Saint Louis for the 2016 USL season.

On 9 November 2016, Saint Louis FC announced that Musa wouldn't be returning to the club for the 2017 season.

=== Swope Park Rangers (2017) ===
On 30 November 2016, Swope Park Rangers, the reserve team for Sporting Kansas City, announced their signing of Musa along with his teammate from Saint Louis FC Parker Maher.

=== Sporting Kansas City (2017) ===
In August 2017, Musa signed a first-team contract with Sporting Kansas City for the remainder of the 2017 season with options for 2018, 2019, and 2020. On 12 August 2017 Musa made his first team debut against Seattle Sounders FC.

=== Phoenix Rising FC (2018 – 2019) ===
On 1 March 2018, Musa signed with Phoenix Rising FC who play in the United Soccer League.

=== Minnesota United (2020) ===
On 17 January 2020, Musa made the move back to MLS, joining Minnesota United FC. Minnesota opted to decline their contract option on Musa following the 2020 season.

=== Return to Phoenix Rising FC (2021 – 2022) ===
On 5 March 2021, Musa re-signed with Phoenix Rising FC.

=== Colorado Springs Switchbacks (2023 – 2024) ===
Musa signed with Colorado Springs Switchbacks on 18 November 2022. Musa made a total of 20 league appearances over the 2023 and 2024 USL Championship seasons for Colorado Springs. The team announced his departure on 28 June 2024.

=== Indy Eleven (2024 – 2025) ===
On 28 June 2024, USL Championship club Indy Eleven announced they had signed Musa in a transfer from Colorado Springs Switchbacks. He made his debut for the Indianapolis-based club on 5 July, in a 3–3 draw at Rhode Island FC. Musa scored his first goal for the club on 8 October in a 1–0 victory at Loudoun United FC. He ended the season with nine total appearances for the club, including the club's playoff loss to Rhode Island FC and historic run to the semifinals in the Open Cup. On 20 November 2024, Indy Eleven announced that Musa would remain with the club for the 2025 season.

Musa scored his second goal for Indy Eleven, and his first of the 2025 season, on 16 August 2025 in a 3–2 loss at Loudoun United.

=== Fort Wayne FC (2026 – present) ===
On January 31, 2026 USL League One club Fort Wayne FC for their Inaugural season.

== International career ==
Musa was selected for the New Zealand U-20 team to compete in the 2011 OFC U-20 Championship in April 2011 and the Suwon Cup in Korea. During the OFC U-20 championship he played in all four matches, scoring a hat-trick during the group stage and helping the Junior All Whites win the tournament and secure qualification to the 2011 FIFA U-20 World Cup at which he played all three games against Cameroon, Uruguay and Portugal.

In February 2012, Musa was selected in New Zealand's 20 man squad to play two friendly matches against Saudi Arabia, coached by former FC Barcelona Manager Frank Rijkaard in Melbourne, Australia in preparation for the 2012 OFC Men's Pre-Olympic Football Tournament to be held in Taupo, New Zealand.

On 25 March 2012 the New Zealand U-23 men's team secured qualification for the 2012 Summer Olympics in London with a 1–0 win over Fiji with a coolly finished penalty from Greg Draper. Musa played a big role in defence during the qualifying campaign with the New Zealand U-23 team going through unbeaten. He also scored 2 goals during the tournament.

On 21 June 2012, Musa was named as one of the 6 defenders in Neil Emblen's 18-man squad for the 2012 Summer Olympics in London, with Ryan Nelsen named as captain and as one of the three overage players.

Musa made one appearance for the New Zealand U-23 team at the 2012 Summer Olympics in London. He came on at left back in the 1–1 draw against Egypt in place of the injured Ian Hogg in the 63rd minute at Old Trafford.

Musa was called into the All Whites squad for a 30 May friendly in Auckland against South Africa by interim coach Neil Emblen. Musa made his international debut on 30 May 2014 against South Africa, coming on as a substitute. The match ended in a nil-all draw.
