= Nansel Selbol =

Nigerian footballer

Personal information
- Date of birth: May 31, 1997 (age 29)
- Place of birth: Jos, Nigeria
- Height: 1.62 m (5 ft 4 in)
- Position: Winger

Team information
- Current team: Bijelo Brdo
- Number: 18

Youth career
- C.O.D. United FC
- Plateau United
- Pawas Soccer Academy
- 2015: Sporting Kansas City

Senior career*
Years	Team	Apps	(Gls)
2016–2017	Swope Park Rangers	49	(10)
2018	Orange County SC	8	(1)
2020–	BBijelo Brdo	24	(0)

International career
2013	Nigeria U17	5	(1)
- * Club domestic league appearances and goals as of 21:25, 6 February 2022 (UTC)

Nansel Selbol (born 31 May 1997) is a Nigerian footballer who plays for BSK Bijelo Brdo.

== Career ==
After spending time in Nigeria with locals sides Pawas Soccer Academy, Plateau United and C.O.D. United FC, Selbol was given the chance to join the academy team of Sporting Kansas City. After a successful season with the academy, scoring 10 goals in 10 games, Selbol joined Kansas City's United Soccer League affiliate Swope Park Rangers on 6 January 2016. He scored his first goal for the Swope Park Rangers with the game-winner against Tulsa Roughnecks FC on April 2, 2016.

In May 2020, Selbol joined Druga HNL side BSK Bijelo Brdo.
