= Christian Duke =

American soccer player (born 1991)

Personal information
- Date of birth: June 5, 1991 (age 35)
- Place of birth: Overland Park, Kansas, United States
- Height: 1.75 m (5 ft 9 in)
- Position: Midfielder

Youth career
- 2007–2009: Kansas City Wizards

College career
Years	Team	Apps	(Gls)
2009–2012	San Diego Toreros	60	(0)

Senior career*
Years	Team	Apps	(Gls)
2013–2014	Sporting Kansas City	0	(0)
2013	→ Orlando City (loan)	21	(1)
2014	→ Oklahoma City Energy (loan)	13	(0)
2015	Oklahoma City Energy	19	(0)
2016–2017	Swope Park Rangers	62	(4)
2018–2019	Orange County SC	44	(1)
2020–2021	Sporting Kansas City II	40	(1)
- * Club domestic league appearances and goals as of February 25, 2022

Christian Duke (born June 5, 1991) is an American former professional soccer player.

== Career ==
=== College ===
Duke spent his entire college career at the University of San Diego. After making only two appearances in 2009, Duke made 17 appearances in his sophomore year in 2010 and tallied two assists on his way to being named All-WCC honorable mention. In 2011, he made 18 appearances and tallied four assists. In his senior year in 2012, Duke made 23 appearances and was named All-West Coast Conference Second Team despite finishing the year without a goal or an assist.

=== Professional ===
On January 22, 2013, Duke was drafted 14th overall in the 2013 MLS Supplemental Draft by Sporting Kansas City. A month later, Duke signed his first professional contract with the club.

Shortly after signing with Kansas City, Duke was loaned out to USL Pro affiliate club Orlando City for the 2013 season along with teammates Dom Dwyer, Jon Kempin and Yann Songo'o. On March 17, 2014, he was assigned on loan to Oklahoma City Energy FC, before being recalled to the Sporting roster on June 4, 2014.

After two seasons with Orange County SC, Duke returned to Kansas City on January 6, 2020, when he joined the now renamed Sporting Kansas City II.

Following the 2021 season, Kansas City opted to decline their contract option on Duke.

On February 23, 2022, Duke signed a one-year contract with the Kansas City Comets of the Major Arena Soccer League.

=== Coaching ===
Duke continues to coach in the greater Kansas City area with the private coaching service, CoachUp.
