= Kharlton Belmar =

Grenadian footballer (born 1992)

Personal information
- Date of birth: December 1, 1992 (age 33)
- Place of birth: Virginia Beach, Virginia, United States
- Height: 1.80 m (5 ft 11 in)
- Position: Forward

Youth career
- 2008–2011: Virginia Rush

College career
Years	Team	Apps	(Gls)
2011–2014	VCU Rams	76	(18)

Senior career*
Years	Team	Apps	(Gls)
2012	Mississippi Brilla	12	(2)
2013	RVA FC	1	(1)
2014	Portland Timbers U23s	14	(8)
2015–2016	Portland Timbers 2	53	(14)
2015	→ New York Cosmos (loan)	1	(0)
2017	Swope Park Rangers	24	(10)
2017–2018	Sporting Kansas City	5	(0)
2017–2018	→ Swope Park Rangers (loan)	24	(14)
2019	Nashville SC	33	(3)
2020–2021	Sacramento Republic	40	(2)
2022	Colorado Springs Switchbacks	27	(0)
2023	Richmond Kickers	21	(2)
2024	Charlotte Independence	15	(1)
Total		270	(57)

International career
2021–2023	Grenada	13	(0)
- * Club domestic league appearances and goals

Kharlton Belmar (born December 1, 1992) is a former professional footballer who played as a forward. Born in the United States, he played for the Grenada national team.

== Career ==
=== College and amateur ===
Belmar spent his entire college career at Virginia Commonwealth University. He made a total of 76 appearances for the Rams and tallied 18 goals and five assists.

He also played in the Premier Development League for Mississippi Brilla and Portland Timbers U23s.

=== Professional ===
==== Portland Timbers 2 ====
On January 15, 2015, Belmar was selected in the second round (34th overall) of the 2015 MLS SuperDraft by the Portland Timbers. However, he was cut from camp and he ended up signing with USL affiliate club Portland Timbers 2. On March 29, he made his professional debut for the club and scored twice in a 3–1 victory over Real Monarchs SLC.

On October 1, 2015, Belmar was signed by the Cosmos on a short-term loan deal from Timbers 2.

==== Sporting Kansas City/Swope Park Rangers ====
Belmar moved to USL side Swope Park Rangers on December 19, 2016. On September 15, 2017, Belmar earned a move to Swope Park's Major League Soccer parent club Sporting Kansas City. He made his debut as a late substitute against the Houston Dynamo on October 11, 2017.

==== Nashville SC ====
After his option was declined by Sporting Kansas City at the end of their 2018 season, Belmar signed with USL Championship side Nashville SC ahead of their 2019 season.

==== Sacramento Republic ====
On December 12, 2019, Belmar moved to USL Championship side Sacramento Republic ahead of their 2020 season. Belmar was released by Sacramento following the 2021 season.

==== Colorado Springs Switchbacks ====
Belmar joined Colorado Springs Switchbacks FC on December 28, 2021.

=== Richmond Kickers ===
On February 9, 2023, Belmar signed with USL League One side Richmond Kickers.

=== Charlotte Independence ===
Belmar moved to USL League One's Charlotte Independence on March 13, 2024.

== International career ==
Belmar was born in the United States and is of Grenadian descent. He was called up to represent the Grenada national team on 16 March 2021. On 25 March, he made his international debut for Grenada in a World Cup qualifier against El Salvador.
