= Colton Storm =

American professional soccer player (born 1994)

Personal information
- Date of birth: July 6, 1994 (age 32)
- Place of birth: Harrisburg, Pennsylvania, United States
- Height: 1.78 m (5 ft 10 in)
- Position: Defender

Youth career
- 2011–2012: Philadelphia Union

College career
| Years | Team | Apps | (Gls) |
| 2013–2016 | North Carolina Tar Heels | 69 | (2) |

Senior career*
| Years | Team | Apps | (Gls) |
| 2014–2015 | Reading United | 9 | (2) |
| 2016 | Portland Timbers U23s | 1 | (0) |
| 2017–2018 | Sporting Kansas City | 0 | (0) |
| 2017–2018 | → Swope Park Rangers (loan) | 53 | (3) |
| 2019 | North Carolina FC | 2 | (0) |
- * Club domestic league appearances and goals as of January 21, 2022

Colton Storm (born July 5, 1994) is an American former professional soccer player who played as a defender, primarily as a right-back.

== Career ==
=== College & Youth ===
Storm played four years of college soccer at UNC-Chapel Hill between 2013 and 2016. While at college, Storm also appeared for USL PDL sides Reading United AC and Portland Timbers U23s.

=== Professional ===
On January 13, 2017, Storm was drafted in the first-round (14th overall) during the 2017 MLS SuperDraft by Sporting Kansas City. He signed with the club on February 25, 2017.

Storm made his professional debut with Kansas City's United Soccer League affiliate Swope Park Rangers, on March 25, 2017, against Oklahoma City Energy.

On August 14, 2019, Storm was signed by North Carolina FC for the remainder of the 2019 USL Championship season.

== Personal ==
On April 1, 2017, Colton Storm was pranked by his fellow Sporting Kansas City teammates Dom Dwyer and Soony Saad. Storm believed he was speaking to a girl named Joanna, and introduced himself as another man named Mark from Cabo. Storm was actually in contact with Dwyer who was responding through Joanna's social media account. Storm showed up at a local Kansas City café and was met by Sporting Kansas City's manager Peter Vermes. Vermes told Storm that he knew that Storm was pretending to be "Mark from Cabo" and told him Joanna was not coming. Storm then saw his teammates Dwyer and Saad and realized that he had been catfished.
