= Parker Maher =

American soccer player

Personal information
- Date of birth: July 12, 1993 (age 33)
- Place of birth: Fort Smith, Arkansas, United States
- Height: 1.80 m (5 ft 11 in)
- Positions: Defender; midfielder

Youth career
- 2011–2014: Missouri State Bears

Senior career*
Years	Team	Apps	(Gls)
2015–2016	Saint Louis FC	50	(1)
2017–2018	Swope Park Rangers	50	(0)
- * Club domestic league appearances and goals as of 10:15, 18 October 2018 (UTC)

Parker Maher (born July 12, 1993) is an American soccer player.

== Career ==
=== College ===
Maher played his entire college soccer career at Missouri State University between 2011 and 2014. While at MSU, Maher earned All-MVC Second Team honors and was named MVC All-Tournament team and All-North/Central Region Academic First Team member.

=== Professional ===
Maher signed with USL club Saint Louis FC on February 13, 2015. He scored his first professional goal against the Charlotte Independence on July 4, 2015, and was named to the USL's Team of the Week for his performance.

Maher parted ways with Saint Louis FC on November 9, 2016. He later signed with Swope Park Rangers on November 30, 2016. Maher was released by Swope Park on December 3, 2018.
