= 2019 Las Vegas Lights FC season =

Las Vegas Lights FC
2019 season
- General manager: Brett Lashbrook
- Head coach: Eric Wynalda
- Stadium: Cashman Field
- USL: Conference: 13th Overall: 25th
- USL Cup Playoffs: Did not qualify
- U.S. Open Cup: Second Round
- Silver State Cup: Runner-Up
- Top goalscorer: League: Irvin Parra (10); All: Irvin Parra (10)
- Highest home attendance: League/All: 10,117 (October 12 vs. Reno
- Lowest home attendance: League: 6,123 (May 11 vs. Col. Springs); All: 2,536 (May 14 vs. Cal FC)
- Average home league attendance: 7,711
- Biggest win: 5–0 (April 13 vs. Tacoma)
- Biggest defeat: 0–4 (May 18 vs. Phoenix)
Home colors	Away colors

The 2019 Las Vegas Lights FC season was the club's second season, and their second season in the United Soccer League Championship, the second division of American soccer.

== Background ==
Lights FC finished its inaugural season third-bottom of the Western Conference table, with the fifth worst record in the United Soccer League. Lights FC were able to score 50 goals during the 2018 season, however the defensive record was poor – conceding 74 goals during the game, third most in the league. Lights FC were led by Raúl Mendiola and Sammy Ochoa, whom each scored 10 goals for Lights FC over all competitions. Despite a poor winning record, Lights FC proved to be highly successful off of the field, recording the fifth highest average attendance in the league and the second highest in the Western Conference.

Following the completion of the Light's 2018 campaign, CEO/Owner/General Manager informed manager Isidro Sánchez Macip that he would not be retained for the 2019 season, following his father, Chelís who had resigned less than a month prior. Three days after announcing Sánchez' sacking, Lights FC introduced former United States national team player Eric Wynalda as Head Coach and Technical Director. Prior to accepting Lights FC's offer, Wynalda had been an analyst and color commentator for Fox Sports 1 and had previous coaching stints with L.A. Wolves FC, Atlanta Silverbacks, and Cal FC whom he led to a U.S. Open Cup upset of Major League Soccer side Portland Timbers in 2012.

With the Las Vegas's minor league baseball franchise moving to a new ballpark in Summerlin, Light FC became the primary tenant at Cashman Field.

== Summary ==
=== Preseason ===
On December 12, 2018, Lights FC announced two preseason friendlies against MLS sides at Cashman Field in preparations for the 2019 season. The matches were to be on February 2 against Toronto FC and February 12 against Colorado Rapids. A final preseason friendly was added to the schedule for March 2 against USL side Orange County SC for March 2.

Lights FC would begin their preseason with a dominating 5–1 victory over Toronto FC, being led by a brace from former Toronto FC draft pick Edwin Rivas and additional goals from Alex Harlley, Irvin Parra, and Bryan Arguez. In the second preseason friendly, Lights FC and Colorado traded goals through the first and second half, leading to a 2–2 draw between the two clubs. Lights FC would get goals from Cristhian Hernández and Christian Torres, while the Rapids would receive goals from Dillon Serna and Nicolás Mezquida. In Lights FC's final preseason friendly, Irvin Parra netted a brace for the club in a 2–1 victory over Orange County.

== Club ==
As of February 23, 2019

No.	Position	Nation	Player
1	GK	USA	Thomas Olsen
3	DF	USA	Kevin Garcia-Lopez
4	DF	USA	Gabe Robinson
5	DF	USA	Javan Torre
6	DF	USA	Mobi Fehr
7	MF	USA	Pablo Cruz
8	FW	USA	Edwin Rivas
9	FW	USA	Sammy Ochoa
11	MF	USA	Irvin Parra
13	MF	USA	Jesus Gonzalez
15	DF	USA	Bryan de la Fuente
16	MF	ARG	Lucas Scaglia
18	MF	VEN	Víctor Rojas
19	FW	CMR	Tabort Etaka Preston (on loan from MFK Vyškov)
22	GK	USA	Angel Alvarez
23	DF	MEX	Christian Torres
24	FW	USA	Jose Villarreal
25	DF	COD	Panzani Sousa
29	FW	COL	Santiago Echavarría
32	DF	MEX	Jonathan Levin
88	FW	HON	Junior Sandoval
—	MF	NED	Vinnie Vermeer (on loan from Nashville SC)

== Competitions ==
=== Exhibitions ===
All times in Pacific Time

February 2 Preseason	Las Vegas Lights FC	5–1	Toronto FC	Las Vegas, Nevada
	Hernández (yellow card) 29'; Harlley 38'; Parra 42'; Rivas 67', 90+1'; Arguez 86'	Report	Telfer 64'	Stadium: Cashman Field; Attendance: 5,232

February 16 Preseason	Las Vegas Lights FC	0–3	Colorado Rapids	Las Vegas, Nevada
		Report	Gashi 23', 25'; Hundley 24'	Stadium: Cashman Field; Attendance: Closed

February 16 Preseason	Las Vegas Lights FC	2–2	Colorado Rapids	Las Vegas, Nevada
	Hernández 44'; Torres 63'	Report	Serna 45+1'; Mezquida 60'	Stadium: Cashman Field; Attendance: 5,619

March 2 Preseason	Las Vegas Lights FC	2–1	Orange County SC	Las Vegas, Nevada
	Parra 11', 72'	Report	13'	Stadium: Cashman Field

=== USL Championship ===
==== Standings ====
Pos	Team	Pld	W	D	L	GF	GA	GD	Pts
11	San Antonio FC	34	12	9	13	62	57	+5	45
12	Rio Grande Valley Toros	34	11	8	15	50	58	−8	41
13	Las Vegas Lights FC	34	11	8	15	46	56	−10	41
14	Portland Timbers 2	34	10	8	16	65	71	−6	38
15	OKC Energy FC	34	9	11	14	45	58	−13	38

Source: USL Championship Standings
Rules for classification: 1) total wins; 2) total goal differential; 3) total goals scored; 4) points earned against top four Conference finishers; 5) disciplinary points; 6) coin toss or drawing of lots

Round	1	2	3	4	5	6	7	8	9	10	11	12	13	14	15	16	17	18	19	20	21	22	23	24	25	26	27	28	29	30	31	32	33	34
Stadium	H	A	A	H	A	H	A	A	H	H	A	H	A	H	H	A	H	H	A	H	A	A	A	H	A	A	H	H	H	A	A	H	H	A
Result	D	L	L	W	L	W	L	D	W	W																								

Updated to match(es) played on April 20, 2019. Source: Match reports
A = Away; H = Home; W = Win; D = Draw; L = Loss

==== Match results ====
On December 19, 2018, the USL announced their 2019 season schedule.

Win Draw Loss Postponed Upcoming fixture

All times in Pacific Time

March 9 1	Las Vegas Lights FC	0–0	Austin Bold FC	Las Vegas, Nevada
7:30 PM	Parra (yellow card) 45+1'; Thomas (yellow card) 87'	Report	Guadarrama (yellow card) 25'; Lima (yellow card) 90+2'	Stadium: Cashman Field; Attendance: 8,017; Referee: Timothy Ford

March 16 2	OKC Energy	2–1	Las Vegas Lights FC	Oklahoma City, Oklahoma
5:30 PM	Brown 13'; Harris (yellow card) 49'; Ross (yellow card) 69'; Gordon 78'	Report	Scaglia (yellow card) 26'; Torre 58'	Stadium: Taft Stadium; Attendance: 5,544; Referee: Sergii Demianchuk

March 23 3	Portland Timbers 2	3–1	Las Vegas Lights FC	Portland, Oregon
7:00 PM	Langsdorf 10'; Asprilla 44' (pen.), 74'	Report	Hernández (yellow card) 22'; Torres (yellow card) 45+1'; Rivas (yellow card) 59'; Robinson 70'	Stadium: Providence Park; Attendance: 2,124; Referee: Farhad Dadkho

March 30 4	Las Vegas Lights FC	1–0	Real Monarchs	Las Vegas, Nevada
7:30 PM	Parra (yellow card) 45+3'; Scaglia (yellow card) 45+3'; Harlley 49'; Torre (yellow card) 90+1'	Report	Blake (yellow card) 37'; Martínez (yellow card) 56'; Powder (yellow card) 58'; Moberg (yellow card) 74'; Etoundi (yellow card) 90+1'	Stadium: Cashman Field; Attendance: 9,102; Referee: Ismir Pekmic

April 6 5	San Antonio FC	2–1	Las Vegas Lights FC	San Antonio, Texas
7:30 p.m. CDT	Jamieson 16'; Barmby (yellow card) 45'; Guzmán (yellow card) 70', (goal) 83'; Cardone (yellow card) 89'	Report	Torres (yellow card) 44'; Torre (yellow card) 45+1'; Rivas (yellow card) 75'; Parra 90+7' (pen.)	Stadium: Toyota Field; Attendance: 6,067; Referee: Alan Kelly

April 13 6	Las Vegas Lights FC	5–0	Tacoma Defiance	Las Vegas, Nevada
7:30 pm (PDT)	Tabortetaka 11', 50'; Parra 23' (pen.), 32', 60', (yellow card) 61'	Report	Daley (yellow card) 28' (yellow-red card) 63'; Campbell (yellow card) 56'	Stadium: Cashman Field; Attendance: 7,805; Referee: Elijio Arreguin

April 20 7	Rio Grande Valley FC Toros	5–2	Las Vegas Lights FC	Edinburg, Texas
5:30 PM	Cabrera 15' (pen.); Martinez 19'; Robinson 46' (o.g.); Foster (yellow card) 74', (goal) 79'; Small 85'; Adams (yellow card) 90'	Report	Sandoval (yellow card) 35'; Etaka (yellow card) 63'; Torres 65'; Cruz (yellow card) 86'; Ochoa 90+1'	Stadium: H-E-B Park; Attendance: 3,483; Referee: Matt Franz

April 29 8	LA Galaxy II	0–0	Las Vegas Lights FC	Carson, California
19:30	Cuello (yellow card) 26'; Romney (yellow card) 39'; Tchilao (yellow card) 48' (yellow-red card) 79'	Report	Scaglia (yellow card) 45+2'; Robinson (yellow card) 52'	Stadium: Dignity Health Sports Park; Attendance: 771; Referee: Victor Rivas

May 4 9	Las Vegas Lights FC	4–2	Sacramento Republic FC	Las Vegas, Nevada
7:30 PM	Parra 67'; Robinson 71'; Echavarria 75'; Sandoval 90'	Report	Partain 51'; Blackwood 90+4'	Stadium: Cashman Field; Attendance: 7,487; Referee: Malik Badawi

May 11 10	Las Vegas Lights FC	3–0	Colorado Springs Switchbacks	Las Vegas, Nevada
8:30 PM	Parra 34', 76' (pen.); Fehr (yellow card) 41'; Ochoa 45+1'; Sandoval (yellow card) 65'; Hernandez (yellow card) 90+1'	Report	Hitzeman (yellow card) 87'	Stadium: Cashman Field; Attendance: 7,023; Referee: Alejandro Aguilera

May 18 11	Phoenix Rising FC	4–0	Las Vegas Lights FC	Scottsdale, Arizona
7:30pm	Lambert 40'; Asante 51'; Bjornethun (yellow card) 73'; Jahn 77'; Flemmings 90+2'	Report; Report	Fehr (yellow card) 31' (red card) 82'; Hernández (yellow card) 79'; Ochoa (yellow card) 80'	Stadium: Casino Arizona Field; Attendance: 6,474; Referee: Mark Allatin

May 25 12	Las Vegas Lights FC	0–0	Colorado Springs Switchbacks	Las Vegas, Nevada
8:30 PM	Garcia-Lopez (yellow card) 10'; Sandoval (yellow card) 55'; Hernández (yellow card) 85'	Report	Mompremier (yellow card) 67'	Stadium: Cashman Field; Attendance: 6,123; Referee: Kevin Stott

June 1 13	Reno 1868 FC	4–0	Las Vegas Lights FC	Reno, Nevada
7:30 PM	Partida (yellow card) 23'; Hertzog 41'; Brown 48'; Mendiola (yellow card) 64', (goal) 79'; Lacroix 86'	Report	Cruz (yellow card) 58'; Tabortetaka (yellow card) 76'; Hernández (yellow card) 90'	Stadium: Greater Nevada Field; Attendance: 4,801; Referee: Rosendo Mendoza

June 8 14	Las Vegas Lights FC	1–1	Orange County SC	Las Vegas, Nevada
7:30 PM	Parra 39'; Torre (yellow card) 43'; Villareal (yellow card) 76'	Report	Amico (red card) 45+1'; Seaton (yellow card) 45+4'; Leonardo 70'	Stadium: Cashman Field; Attendance: 6,801; Referee: Dejan Susak

June 15 15	Las Vegas Lights FC	5–1	New Mexico United	Las Vegas, Nevada
7:30 PM	Torre 32', (yellow card) 33'; Hernández 40'; Garcia-Lopez (yellow card) 45'; Tabortetaka 47'; Robinson (yellow card) 69'; Estrada 90'; Sandoval 90+4'	Report	Tetteh (yellow card) 39'; Estrada 88'	Stadium: Cashman Field; Attendance: 7,882; Referee: Farhad Dadkho

June 22 16	El Paso Locomotive FC	0–1	Las Vegas Lights FC	El Paso, Texas
7:30 PM	Kiesewetter (yellow card) 66'; Beckie (yellow card) 90+3'	Report	Torres (yellow card) 27'; Tabortetaka 42'; Robinson (yellow card) 70'; Sandoval (yellow card) 71'; J. Gonzalez (yellow card) 81'; Olsen (yellow card) 86'; Fehr (yellow card) 90+5'	Stadium: Southwest University Park; Referee: Michael Radchuk

June 29 17	Las Vegas Lights FC	0–1	OKC Energy FC	Las Vegas, Nevada
7:30 PM	Garcia-Lopez (yellow card) 14'; Robinson (yellow card) 35'	Report	J. Brown (yellow card) 66'; Jones (yellow card) 69'; Bosetti (yellow card) 83'; D.Brown 89'	Stadium: Cashman Field; Attendance: 9,418; Referee: Victor Rivas

July 4 18	Las Vegas Lights FC	2–2	LA Galaxy II	Las Vegas, Nevada
19:30	Gonzalez 18'; Fehr (yellow card) 58'; Parra 85' (pen.), (yellow card) 87'	Report	Harvey 30'; López 47'; Tchilao (yellow card) 83'	Stadium: Cashman Field; Attendance: 8,404; Referee: Elton García

July 24 19	Tacoma Defiance	4–1	Las Vegas Lights FC	Tacoma, Washington
7:00 pm (PDT)	Dhillon 31'; Ocampo-Chavez 47', 66'; Burke-Gilroy (yellow card) 73'; Hopeau 85'	Report	Sandoval (yellow card) 4'; Torre 36', (red card) 75'; Parra (yellow card) 45+2'; Olsen (yellow card) 69'; Gonzalez (red card) 70'; Ochoa (red card) 86'; Preston (yellow card) 90+4'	Stadium: Cheney Stadium; Attendance: 2,208; Referee: Lukasz Szpala

July 27 20	Las Vegas Lights FC	2–1	Rio Grande Valley FC Toros	Las Vegas, Nevada
9:30 PM	Robinson 10'; Parra 31'; Tabortetaka (yellow card) 41'; Rojas (yellow card) 88'	Report	Small 26'; Bird (yellow card) 38'	Stadium: Cashman Field; Attendance: 8,818; Referee: Elijio Arreguin

August 3 21	Fresno FC	2–1	Las Vegas Lights	Fresno, California
8:30 PM	Chavez 41', 56'	Report	Levin (red card) 45+3'; Cruz 80'	Stadium: Chukchansi Park; Attendance: 3,413; Referee: Turan Ozdemir

August 7 22	Sacramento Republic FC	0–0	Las Vegas Lights FC	Sacramento, California
8:00 PM	Alemán (yellow card) 32'; Mahoney (yellow card) 46'; Barahona (yellow card) 87'	Report	Torres (yellow card) 26'; Parra (yellow card) 31'; Tabortetaka (yellow card) 70'	Stadium: Papa Murphy's Park; Attendance: 10,431; Referee: Mark Allatin

August 17 23	Orange County SC	3–0	Las Vegas Lights FC	Irvine, California
7:00 PM	Amico (yellow card) 12'; Duke (yellow card) 46'; Forrester (yellow card) 56' van Ewijk 68'; Quinn 76'; Seaton 86'	Report	Sandoval (yellow card) 49' (yellow-red card) 89'	Stadium: Championship Soccer Stadium; Attendance: 3,287; Referee: Elvis Osmanovic

August 24 24	Las Vegas Lights FC	1–0	Portland Timbers 2	Las Vegas, Nevada
9:30 PM	Villareal 45'	Report	Williamson (yellow card) 52'; Smith (yellow card) 83'; Langsdorf (yellow card) 90+5'	Stadium: Cashman Field; Attendance: 7,686; Referee: Rosendo Mendoza

August 28 25	Tulsa Roughnecks	1–1	Las Vegas Lights FC	Tulsa, Oklahoma
6:00 PM	Mompremier (yellow card) 33'; Uzo 70'	Report	Gonzalez (yellow card) 34'; Martínez (yellow card) 39'; Torre 62'; Sousa (yellow card) 67'	Stadium: ONEOK Field; Attendance: 1,503; Referee: Thomas Snyder

September 4 26	Real Monarchs	2–2	Las Vegas Lights FC	Herriman, Utah
8:00 PM	Blake 44' (pen.), 90+6'; Holt (yellow card) 52'; Martínez (yellow card) 90+6'	Report	Torres 9'; Sousa (yellow card) 15'; Robinson (yellow card) 31'; Tabortetaka 81'	Stadium: Zions Bank Stadium; Attendance: 1,471; Referee: Guido Gonzales Jr.

September 7 27	Las Vegas Lights FC	0–3	El Paso Locomotive FC	Las Vegas, Nevada
7:30 PM	Torres (yellow card) 20'; Sandoval (yellow card) 29' (yellow-red card) 85'; Torre (yellow card) 39'	Report	Kiffe (yellow card) 46'; Velásquez 52' (pen.), (yellow card) 68'; Gómez 81', 90'	Stadium: Cashman Field; Attendance: 6,308; Referee: Farhad Dadkho

September 11 28	Las Vegas Lights	0–1	Phoenix Rising FC	Las Vegas, Nevada
7:30pm	Tabortetaka (yellow card) 65'; Villarreal (yellow card) 88'	Report	Calistri (yellow card) 49'; Jahn 62'	Stadium: Cashman Field; Attendance: 5,101; Referee: David Barrie

September 14 29	Las Vegas Lights FC	3–1	Fresno FC	Las Vegas, Nevada
7:30 PM	Martínez 21'; Sousa (yellow card) 54'; Tabortetaka 58'; Parra 71' (pen.)	Report	Daly (yellow card) 9'; Cooper 17', (yellow card) 78' del Campo (yellow card) 52'	Stadium: Cashman Field; Attendance: 7,228; Referee: Malik Badawi

September 22 30	Austin Bold FC	4–1	Las Vegas Lights FC	Austin, Texas
4:00 PM	Kléber 21', 31', 90+1'; Lima 51'; Báez (yellow card) 61'	Report	Sousa 23', (yellow card) 28'; Sandoval (yellow card) 45+1'	Stadium: Austin Bold Stadium; Attendance: 3,004; Referee: Luis Guardia

September 28 31	Colorado Springs Switchbacks	1–3	Las Vegas Lights FC	Colorado Springs, Colorado
7:00 PM	Malcolm (yellow card) 25'; Rwatubyaye 90+2'	Report	de la Fuente (yellow card) 42'; Parra 55', (yellow card) 75', (goal) 84'; Tabortetaka 81'	Stadium: Weidner Field; Attendance: 4,279; Referee: Mark Allatin

October 5 32	Las Vegas Lights FC	4–2	San Antonio FC	Las Vegas, Nevada
7:30 PM	Parra 8', (yellow card) 19', (goal) 45+5'; Etaka 22'; Fehr (yellow card) 34'; Garcia-Lopez (yellow card) 78'; Martínez 90+8'	Report	Gómez 10'; López 70' (pen.), (red card) 90+6'; Ackon (yellow card) 90'	Stadium: Cashman Field; Attendance: 7,765; Referee: Greg Dopka

October 12 33	Las Vegas Lights FC	0–2	Reno 1868 FC	Las Vegas, Nevada
7:30 PM	Villareal (yellow card) 90'	Report	Torre 35' (o.g.); Haji 76'	Stadium: Cashman Field; Attendance: 10,117; Referee: Michael Radchuk

October 19 34	New Mexico United	2–0	Las Vegas Lights FC	Albuquerque, New Mexico
7:00 PM	Wehan 37'; Tetteh (yellow card) 75'; Hamilton (yellow card) 77'; Sandoval 87'	Report	Torre (yellow card) 58'; Torres (yellow card) 81'	Stadium: Isotopes Park; Attendance: 13,788; Referee: Rosendo Mendoza

=== U.S. Open Cup ===
As a member of the USL Championship, Las Vegas Lights entered the tournament in the Second Round.

May 14 Second Round	Las Vegas Lights FC (Nevada)	2–0	(California) Cal FC	Las Vegas, Nevada
7:30 pm	Ochoa 13', (yellow card) 60'; Torres (yellow card) 41'; Rojas 50'; Sandoval (yellow card) 62'; Cruz (yellow card) 68'; Levin (red card) 90+2'	Report	Barrera (yellow card) 82'; Vásquez (yellow card) 87' (red card) 90+2'	Stadium: Cashman Field; Attendance: 2,536; Referee: Alejandro Aguilera

May 29 Third Round	Las Vegas Lights FC (Nevada)	3–5	(California) Orange County FC (NPSL)	Las Vegas, Nevada
7:30 pm PDT	Echavarría 23' (pen.); Sandoval (yellow card) 32', (goal) 85'; Rivas 47'; Torres (red card) 74'	Report	Shelton 6', (yellow card) 74'; Fehr 16' (o.g.); Holland (yellow card) 23'; Collins 35'; Lombardi (yellow card) 84'; Frischknecht 89'; Flores 90+1'	Stadium: Cashman Field; Attendance: 2,378; Referee: Samantha Martinez

== Statistics ==
=== Appearances ===
Numbers in parentheses denote appearances as substitute.
Players listed with no appearances have been in the matchday squad, but only as unused substitutes.
Discipline includes league, playoffs, and Open Cup play.
Key to positions: GK – Goalkeeper; DF – Defender; MF – Midfielder; FW – Forward

No.	Pos.	Name	League		Playoffs		U.S. Open Cup		Total		Discipline	
No.	Pos.	Name	Apps	Goals	Apps	Goals	Apps	Goals	Apps	Goals	Yellow card	Red card
1	GK	(United States) Thomas Olsen	1	0	0	0	0	0	1	0	0	0
2	DF	(United States) Miguel Palafox	0	0	0	0	0	0	0	0	0	0
3	DF	(United States) Kevin Garcia-Lopez	1	0	0	0	0	0	1	0	0	0
4	DF	(United States) Gabe Robinson	1	0	0	0	0	0	1	0	0	0
5	DF	(United States) Javan Torre	1	0	0	0	0	0	1	0	0	0
7	MF	(United States) Pablo Cruz	1	0	0	0	0	0	1	0	0	0
8	FW	(United States) Edwin Rivas	0	0	0	0	0	0	0	0	0	0
9	FW	(United States) Sammy Ochoa	0	0	0	0	0	0	0	0	0	0
10	MF	(Mexico) Cristhian Hernández	1	0	0	0	0	0	1	0	0	0
11	MF	(United States) Irvin Parra	1	0	0	0	0	0	1	0	1	0
14	MF	(Togo) Alex Harlley	1	0	0	0	0	0	1	0	0	0
15	DF	(United States) Bryan de la Fuente	0	0	0	0	0	0	0	0	0	0
16	MF	(Argentina) Lucas Scaglia	1	0	0	0	0	0	1	0	0	0
17	MF	(United States) Bryan Arguez	0	0	0	0	0	0	0	0	0	0
19	FW	(Cameroon) Tabort Etaka Preston	0 (1)	0	0	0	0	0	0 (1)	0	0	0
20	FW	(Cameroon) Bin Adolf Enow	0	0	0	0	0	0	0	0	0	0
21	MF	(United States) Matt Thomas	0 (1)	0	0	0	0	0	0 (1)	0	1	0
22	GK	(United States) Angel Alvarez	0	0	0	0	0	0	0	0	0	0
23	DF	(Mexico) Christian Torres	1	0	0	0	0	0	1	0	0	0
25	MF	(Democratic Republic of the Congo) Panzani Sousa	0 (1)	0	0	0	0	0	0 (1)	0	0	0
28	MF	(United States) Eric Gonzalez	1	0	0	0	0	0	1	0	0	0

Last updated: March 10, 2019.
Source: Las Vegas Lights FC

=== Clean sheets ===
The list is sorted by shirt number when total appearances are equal.

Rnk	No.	Player	United Soccer League	USL Playoffs	U.S. Open Cup	Total
1	1	(United States) Thomas Olsen	1	0	0	1
TOTALS			1	0	0	1

Last updated: March 10, 2019.
Source: Las Vegas Lights FC
