= 2019 USL Championship season =

9th season of the USL Championship

USL Championship
- Season: 2019
- Champions: Real Monarchs SLC
- Regular season title: Phoenix Rising FC
- Matches: 612
- Goals: 1,904 (3.11 per match)
- Best player: (Ghana) Solomon Asante, Phoenix Rising FC
- Top goalscorer: (Ghana) Solomon Asante, Phoenix Rising FC (22 Goals)
- Best goalkeeper: (United States) Matt Pickens, Nashville SC
- Biggest home win: NYR 8–1 ATL (July 13); PGH 7–0 BHM (October 26) - USL Playoff Record
- Biggest away win: ATL 0–5 PIT (June 15); CHS 0–5 TBR (August 3)
- Highest scoring: LOU 8–3 SPR (October 12)
- Longest winning run: 20 games Phoenix Rising FC (May 10 – September 21) (USLC Record, North American Record)
- Longest unbeaten run: 20 games Phoenix Rising FC (May 10 – September 21)
- Longest winless run: 17 games Tulsa Roughnecks (April 27 – August 28)
- Longest losing run: 8 games Hartford Athletic (March 9 – April 27)
- Highest attendance: 20,251; IND 1–0 HFD (March 30)
- Lowest attendance: 214; SPR 3–2 LOU (May 6)
- Total attendance: 2,740,323
- Average attendance: 4,478
- All statistics correct as of November 17, 2019.

The 2019 USL Championship season was the ninth season of the USL Championship and third under Division II sanctioning. This was the first season in which the league operated under the name "USL Championship," having used the moniker "United Soccer League" through 2018. The season began on March 8, 2019, and concluded on October 20, 2019, with each team playing 34 matches. 36 teams competed in the 2019 USL Championship season, split into 2 conferences of 18 teams each. Louisville City FC were the two-time defending champions.

The 2019 season was the last for the current version of Nashville SC. The club's identity transferred to a Major League Soccer team that started to play in 2020. Additionally, this season was the last for Ottawa Fury FC. On November 8, the club announced that it had suspended operations; Fury FC had received sanctioning from its country's governing body, Canada Soccer, but was denied by U.S. Soccer and the continental governing body of CONCACAF.

== Changes from 2018 ==
Expansion clubs

- Austin Bold FC
- Birmingham Legion FC
- El Paso Locomotive FC
- Hartford Athletic
- Loudoun United FC
- Memphis 901 FC
- New Mexico United

Departing clubs

- FC Cincinnati (moved to MLS)
- Penn FC (folded)
- Richmond Kickers (moved to USL League One)
- Toronto FC II (moved to USL League One)

Rebranded clubs

- Seattle Sounders FC 2 rebranded as Tacoma Defiance and moved to Tacoma, Washington

== Teams ==
Locations of teams for the 2019 USL Championship season
Western Conference Eastern Conference

The following teams are playing in the 2019 USL Championship season:

Team	Location/State	Stadium	Capacity	Head coach
Atlanta United 2	Kennesaw, Georgia	Fifth Third Bank Stadium	8,318	(Scotland) Stephen Glass
Austin Bold FC	Austin, Texas	Bold Stadium	5,000	(Brazil) Marcelo Serrano
Bethlehem Steel FC	Chester, Pennsylvania	Talen Energy Stadium	16,000	(United States) Brendan Burke
Birmingham Legion FC	Birmingham, Alabama	BBVA Field	5,000	(United States) Tom Soehn
Charleston Battery	Charleston, South Carolina	MUSC Health Stadium	5,100	(United States) Michael Anhaeuser
Charlotte Independence	Matthews, North Carolina	Sportsplex at Matthews	5,000	(United States) Michael Jeffries
Colorado Springs Switchbacks FC	Colorado Springs, Colorado	Weidner Field	5,000	(South Africa) Alan Koch
El Paso Locomotive FC	El Paso, Texas	Southwest University Park	9,500	(England) Mark Lowry
Fresno FC	Fresno, California	Chukchansi Park	12,500	(England) Adam Smith
Hartford Athletic	Hartford, Connecticut	Dillon Stadium	5,500	(Denmark) Jimmy Nielsen
Indy Eleven	Indianapolis, Indiana	Lucas Oil Stadium	62,421	(Scotland) Martin Rennie
LA Galaxy II	Carson, California	Dignity Health Track Stadium	5,000	(United States) Junior Gonzalez
Las Vegas Lights FC	Las Vegas, Nevada	Cashman Field	9,334	(United States) Eric Wynalda
Loudoun United FC	Leesburg, Virginia	Segra Field	5,000	(United States) Ryan Martin
Louisville City FC	Louisville, Kentucky	Louisville Slugger Field	8,000	(United States) John Hackworth
Memphis 901 FC	Memphis, Tennessee	AutoZone Park	10,000	(United States) Tim Mulqueen
Nashville SC	Nashville, Tennessee	First Tennessee Park	10,000	(England) Gary Smith
New Mexico United	Albuquerque, New Mexico	Isotopes Park	13,500	(United States) Troy Lesesne
New York Red Bulls II	Montclair, New Jersey	MSU Soccer Park at Pittser Field	5,000	(United States) John Wolyniec
North Carolina FC	Cary, North Carolina	WakeMed Soccer Park	10,000	(United States) David Sarachan
OKC Energy FC	Oklahoma City, Oklahoma	Taft Stadium	7,500	(England) Steve Cooke
Orange County SC	Irvine, California	Champion Stadium	5,000	(United States) Braeden Cloutier
Ottawa Fury FC	Ottawa, Ontario	TD Place Stadium	24,000	(Serbia) Nikola Popović
Phoenix Rising FC	Tempe, Arizona	Casino Arizona Field	6,200	(United States) Rick Schantz
Pittsburgh Riverhounds SC	Pittsburgh, Pennsylvania	Highmark Stadium	5,000	(United States) Bob Lilley
Portland Timbers 2	Portland, Oregon	Providence Park	25,218	(New Zealand) Cameron Knowles
Real Monarchs	Herriman, Utah	Zions Bank Stadium	5,000	(Colombia) Jámison Olave
Reno 1868 FC	Reno, Nevada	Greater Nevada Field	9,013	(United States) Ian Russell
Rio Grande Valley FC Toros	Edinburg, Texas	H-E-B Park	9,400	(United States) Gerson Echeverry
Sacramento Republic FC	Sacramento, California	Papa Murphy's Park	11,569	(New Zealand) Simon Elliott
Saint Louis FC	Fenton, Missouri	Toyota Stadium	5,500	(Wales) Anthony Pulis
San Antonio FC	San Antonio, Texas	Toyota Field	8,296	(England) Darren Powell
Swope Park Rangers	Kansas City, Kansas	Children's Mercy Park	18,467	(Brazil) Paulo Nagamura
Tacoma Defiance	Tacoma, Washington	Cheney Stadium	6,500	(Scotland) Chris Little
Tampa Bay Rowdies	St. Petersburg, Florida	Al Lang Stadium	7,227	(Scotland) Neill Collins
Tulsa Roughnecks FC	Tulsa, Oklahoma	ONEOK Field	7,833	(United States) Michael Nsien

MLS-affiliated
MLS-owned

== Competition format ==
The season began the weekend of March 8–10 and will conclude the weekend of October 18–20. The 2019 USL Cup Playoffs are expected to begin October 25–27, and conclude with the final match November 14–18.

This is the first season where the USL teams will only play teams within their own conference for regular-season and playoff games until the USL Cup final. Thus, each team will play a balanced home-and-away schedule against each of the other teams in its conference, resulting in a 34-game schedule.

=== Managerial changes ===
Team	Outgoing manager	Manner of departure	Date of vacancy	Incoming manager	Date of appointment
Las Vegas Lights FC	(Mexico) (Canada) Isidro Sánchez	Contract not renewed	October 14, 2018	(United States) Eric Wynalda	October 17, 2018
North Carolina FC	(Northern Ireland) Colin Clarke	Contract not renewed	October 17, 2018	(United States) David Sarachan	December 17, 2018
Phoenix Rising FC	(United States) Rick Schantz	End of interim period	November 14, 2018	(United States) Rick Schantz	November 14, 2018
Charlotte Independence	(United States) Michael Jefferies	Promoted to general manager	December 7, 2018	(Republic of Ireland) Jim McGuinness	December 7, 2018
Tulsa Roughnecks	(United States) Michael Nsien	End of interim period	December 7, 2018	(United States) Michael Nsien	December 7, 2018
Real Monarchs	(Colombia) Jámison Olave	End of interim period	January 21, 2019	(United States) Martín Vásquez	January 21, 2019
Tacoma Defiance	(Australia) (Malta) John Hutchinson	Left organization	January 23, 2019	(Scotland) Chris Little	January 23, 2019
Atlanta United 2	(United States) Scott Donnelly	Left organization	January 10, 2019	(Scotland) Stephen Glass	January 30, 2019
Loudoun United FC	(United States) Richie Williams	Left organization	May 30, 2019	(United States) Ryan Martin	May 30, 2019
Charlotte Independence	(Republic of Ireland) Jim McGuinness	Sacked	June 12, 2019	(United States) Michael Jeffries	June 12, 2019
Real Monarchs	(United States) Martín Vásquez	Left organization	July 1, 2019	(Colombia) Jámison Olave (Interim)	July 1, 2019
Colorado Springs Switchbacks	(United States) Steve Trittschuh	Sacked	July 1, 2019	(Jamaica) Wolde Harris (Interim)	July 1, 2019
LA Galaxy II	(United States) Mike Muñoz	Sacked	July 19, 2019	(United States) Junior Gonzalez (Interim)	July 19, 2019
Colorado Springs Switchbacks	(Jamaica) Wolde Harris	End of interim period	September 23, 2019	(South Africa) Alan Koch	September 23, 2019

== League table ==
Eastern Conference

Pos	Team	Pld	W	D	L	GF	GA	GD	Pts	Qualification
1	Pittsburgh Riverhounds SC	34	19	11	4	58	30	+28	68	Conference Quarterfinals
2	Nashville SC	34	20	7	7	59	26	+33	67	Conference Quarterfinals
3	Indy Eleven	34	19	6	9	48	29	+19	63	Conference Quarterfinals
4	Louisville City FC	34	17	9	8	58	41	+17	60	Conference Quarterfinals
5	Tampa Bay Rowdies	34	16	10	8	61	33	+28	58	Conference Quarterfinals
6	New York Red Bulls II	34	17	6	11	74	51	+23	57	Conference Quarterfinals
7	North Carolina FC	34	16	8	10	57	37	+20	56	Play-In Round
8	Ottawa Fury FC	34	14	10	10	50	43	+7	52	Play-In Round
9	Charleston Battery	34	11	13	10	44	44	0	46	Play-In Round
10	Birmingham Legion FC	34	12	7	15	35	51	−16	43	Play-In Round
11	Saint Louis FC	34	11	9	14	40	41	−1	42	
12	Loudoun United FC	34	11	6	17	59	65	−6	39	
13	Charlotte Independence	34	9	11	14	42	53	−11	38	
14	Atlanta United 2	34	9	8	17	45	77	−32	35	
15	Memphis 901 FC	34	9	7	18	37	52	−15	34	
16	Bethlehem Steel FC	34	8	7	19	49	78	−29	31	
17	Hartford Athletic	34	8	5	21	49	80	−31	29	
18	Swope Park Rangers	34	6	8	20	46	80	−34	26	

Source: USL Championship Standings
Rules for classification: 1) total wins; 2) total goal differential; 3) total goals scored; 4) points earned against top four Conference finishers; 5) disciplinary points; 6) coin toss or drawing of lots

Western Conference

Pos	Team	Pld	W	D	L	GF	GA	GD	Pts	Qualification
1	Phoenix Rising FC (X)	34	24	6	4	89	36	+53	78	Conference Quarterfinals
2	Reno 1868 FC	34	18	6	10	72	51	+21	60	Conference Quarterfinals
3	Fresno FC	34	16	9	9	58	44	+14	57	Conference Quarterfinals
4	Real Monarchs (C)	34	16	8	10	71	53	+18	56	Conference Quarterfinals
5	Orange County SC	34	15	9	10	54	43	+11	54	Conference Quarterfinals
6	El Paso Locomotive FC	34	13	11	10	42	36	+6	50	Conference Quarterfinals
7	Sacramento Republic	34	14	6	14	50	43	+7	48	Play-In Round
8	Austin Bold FC	34	13	9	12	53	52	+1	48	Play-In Round
9	LA Galaxy II	34	12	12	10	59	62	−3	48	Play-In Round
10	New Mexico United	34	11	13	10	59	57	+2	46	Play-In Round
11	San Antonio FC	34	12	9	13	62	57	+5	45	
12	Rio Grande Valley Toros	34	11	8	15	50	58	−8	41	
13	Las Vegas Lights FC	34	11	8	15	46	56	−10	41	
14	Portland Timbers 2	34	10	8	16	65	71	−6	38	
15	OKC Energy FC	34	9	11	14	45	58	−13	38	
16	Tulsa Roughnecks	34	8	10	16	45	69	−24	34	
17	Tacoma Defiance	34	8	7	19	42	82	−40	31	
18	Colorado Springs Switchbacks	34	7	6	21	31	65	−34	27	

Source: USL Championship Standings
Rules for classification: 1) total wins; 2) total goal differential; 3) total goals scored; 4) points earned against top four Conference finishers; 5) disciplinary points; 6) coin toss or drawing of lots
(C) Champions; (X) Regular Season League Champion

== Results table ==
Color Key: Home • Away • Win • Loss • Draw
Club	Match																																	
Club	1	2	3	4	5	6	7	8	9	10	11	12	13	14	15	16	17	18	19	20	21	22	23	24	25	26	27	28	29	30	31	32	33	34
Atlanta United 2 (ATL)	HFD	LOU	CLT	STL	MEM	NCA	TBR	OTT	NSH	BST	SPR	CHS	NYR	PGH	IND	LDN	NYR	BHM	CLT	NCA	LDN	LOU	SPR	HFD	MEM	BHM	OTT	TBR	CHS	IND	STL	PGH	BST	NSH
Atlanta United 2 (ATL)	2–0	0–1	3–3	0–2	1–0	2–1	1–4	0–2	0–2	1–1	1–1	1–1	1–3	0–5	0–1	1–2	1–8	0–4	2–2	2–4	4–2	1–5	2–1	2–3	1–2	0–5	3–2	1–1	3–1	2–1	1–1	1–1	5–2	0–3
Austin Bold FC (AUS)	LVL	RNO	SAN	SAC	PHX	ELP	SLC	LAG	OKC	OCO	FRS	NMU	TUL	POR	TAC	RGV	COS	SAN	OCO	PHX	FRS	NMU	LAG	TUL	OKC	RGV	COS	SAC	RNO	LVL	POR	ELP	SLC	TAC
Austin Bold FC (AUS)	0–0	1–2	1–0	0–1	1–0	0–0	3–2	0–1	2–1	2–2	0–1	1–3	3–2	2–2	1–1	1–0	5–0	0–3	3–2	0–6	1–0	2–2	1–3	5–1	2–4	3–0	1–1	1–2	1–2	4–1	2–1	1–1	2–2	1–3
Bethlehem Steel FC (BST)	BHM	NCA	MEM	PGH	SPR	CHS	CLT	IND	LDN	ATL	OTT	LOU	NYR	NSH	STL	TBR	HFD	PGH	NYR	LOU	STL	HFD	NSH	BHM	SPR	NCA	IND	LDN	TBR	MEM	CLT	ATL	OTT	CHS
Bethlehem Steel FC (BST)	2–0	0–1	0–1	2–2	4–3	3–1	1–2	0–3	3–3	1–1	0–3	2–2	0–4	1–4	3–1	1–2	3–0	0–1	3–4	1–0	0–3	0–3	0–0	2–3	2–0	3–3	1–2	5–2	1–6	0–5	1–2	2–5	1–1	1–5
Birmingham Legion FC (BHM)	BST	OTT	LOU	STL	SPR	LDN	NYR	MEM	LOU	NCA	NSH	TBR	CHS	CLT	HFD	IND	PGH	NCA	ATL	CLT	OTT	TBR	MEM	BST	LDN	ATL	STL	NSH	IND	SPR	CHS	HFD	NYR	PGH
Birmingham Legion FC (BHM)	0–2	0–1	3–2	3–2	0–0	1–0	0–5	2–2	0–3	0–0	0–1	0–2	1–3	1–4	2–2	0–3	1–4	1–0	4–0	1–0	0–0	1–0	1–0	3–2	1–1	5–0	0–2	0–1	1–0	1–3	0–0	0–4	2–1	0–1
Charleston Battery (CHS)	OTT	HFD	NCA	CLT	BST	NSH	MEM	PGH	STL	IND	ATL	LOU	BHM	TBR	SPR	OTT	NYR	HFD	TBR	STL	LDN	LOU	NSH	CLT	IND	SPR	PGH	ATL	NCA	NYR	BHM	LDN	MEM	BST
Charleston Battery (CHS)	1–1	2–1	1–1	2–0	1–3	3–1	1–0	2–2	0–0	0–1	1–1	1–4	3–1	1–1	1–1	2–3	1–1	3–2	0–5	1–1	2–1	1–2	1–2	0–0	1–0	0–0	0–1	1–3	2–1	1–1	0–0	1–2	2–0	5–1
Charlotte Independence (CLT)	IND	ATL	STL	CHS	NYR	BET	NCA	TBR	HFD	LDN	NSH	PGH	OTT	SPR	BHM	LOU	MEM	NCA	PGH	STL	ATL	BHM	LOU	LDN	NSH	IND	CHS	TBR	NYR	SPR	HFD	BST	MEM	OTT
Charlotte Independence (CLT)	2–3	3–3	0–1	0–2	1–2	2–1	0–3	1–1	1–1	1–3	1–1	0–0	1–4	0–0	4–1	1–1	1–0	1–1	1–0	2–1	2–2	0–1	0–1	3–3	1–3	1–3	0–0	1–3	0–2	0–3	4–0	2–1	2–1	3–1
Colorado Springs Switchbacks (COS)	LAG	SAC	SAN	PHX	OCO	RNO	POR	TUL	ELP	LVL	NMU	OKC	FRS	TAC	RGV	SLC	AUS	OCO	TUL	OKC	RNO	SLC	POR	RGV	SAC	FRS	PHX	AUS	NMU	ELP	LVL	LAG	TAC	SAN
Colorado Springs Switchbacks (COS)	4–1	0–1	1–0	2–2	0–2	0–2	2–2	0–2	0–2	0–3	1–3	0–1	1–0	3–0	0–3	1–2	0–5	1–2	1–0	1–0	0–4	0–1	2–2	3–3	0–4	1–2	0–3	1–1	1–3	0–2	1–3	2–0	0–2	2–2
El Paso Locomotive (ELP)	OKC	SLC	RGV	OCO	PHX	AUS	RNO	COS	NMU	SAC	POR	TAC	LAG	TUL	LVL	SAN	FRS	OKC	SAN	SLC	NMU	PHX	TAC	RGV	TUL	LVL	OCO	COS	SAC	FRS	RNO	AUS	POR	LAG
El Paso Locomotive (ELP)	1–3	0–0	2–2	2–0	0–2	0–0	1–0	2–0	2–2	3–1	1–1	2–1	3–0	2–0	0–1	0–0	0–3	1–1	1–3	0–0	0–3	1–2	2–0	0–1	2–2	3–0	0–2	2–0	2–1	2–1	0–0	1–1	4–1	0–2
Fresno FC (FRS)	NMU	RGV	RNO	PHX	TUL	OCO	SLC	SAC	LAG	AUS	TAC	COS	OKC	POR	SAN	ELP	SAC	NMU	POR	AUS	LVL	OKC	SLC	COS	TUL	RNO	LVL	RGV	PHX	SAN	ELP	TAC	LAG	OCO
Fresno FC (FRS)	1–1	2–0	1–1	0–0	3–1	2–2	4–2	0–1	3–0	1–0	3–3	0–1	1–1	2–2	3–2	3–0	1–0	2–1	2–1	0–1	2–1	2–1	1–1	2–1	1–2	3–2	1–3	5–0	2–1	1–2	1–2	1–4	2–2	0–2
Hartford Athletic (HFD)	ATL	CHS	LOU	IND	TBR	PGH	NYR	NCA	CLT	MEM	LDN	OTT	NCA	STL	NSH	BHM	BST	MEM	IND	SPR	CHS	PGH	BST	NSH	NYR	ATL	STL	LDN	LOU	OTT	CLT	SPR	BHM	TBR
Hartford Athletic (HFD)	0–2	1–2	1–2	0–1	0–4	1–3	0–4	1–4	1–1	1–2	2–1	1–1	1–1	2–1	2–3	2–2	0–3	1–4	2–1	3–4	2–3	2–4	3–0	0–4	1–5	3–2	2–3	5–1	0–1	1–4	0–4	2–2	4–0	2–1
Indy Eleven (IND)	STL	CLT	HFD	SPR	BST	NYR	TBR	NCA	CHS	NSH	PGH	MEM	LDN	ATL	BHM	LOU	HFD	LDN	NSH	NCA	STL	CLT	LOU	NYR	CHS	OTT	BST	BHM	ATL	PGH	OTT	MEM	TBR	SPR
Indy Eleven (IND)	1–2	3–2	1–0	2–1	3–0	1–2	0–0	0–0	1–0	0–0	2–1	3–0	2–1	1–0	3–0	1–1	1–2	2–0	0–2	2–1	2–1	3–1	1–1	1–0	0–1	2–0	2–1	0–1	1–2	0–3	0–1	3–0	1–1	2–1
Las Vegas Lights (LVL)	AUS	OKC	POR	SLC	SAN	TAC	RGV	LAG	SAC	COS	PHX	TUL	RNO	OCO	NMU	ELP	OKC	LAG	TAC	RGV	FRS	SAC	OCO	POR	TUL	SLC	ELP	PHX	FRS	AUS	COS	SAN	RNO	NMU
Las Vegas Lights (LVL)	0–0	1–2	1–3	1–0	1–2	5–0	2–5	0–0	4–2	3–0	0–4	0–0	0–4	1–1	5–1	1–0	0–1	2–2	1–4	2–1	1–2	0–0	0–3	1–0	1–1	2–2	0–3	0–1	3–1	1–4	3–1	4–2	0–2	0–2
LA Galaxy II (LAG)	COS	TAC	SLC	POR	TUL	SAN	RGV	LVL	AUS	FRE	RGV	OCO	TAC	OKC	ELP	RNO	NMU	OCO	LVL	RNO	TUL	POR	PHX	AUS	NMU	SAC	SLC	PHX	SAN	OKC	SAC	COS	FRE	ELP
LA Galaxy II (LAG)	1–4	3–0	0–5	3–2	4–2	0–2	4–4	0–0	1–0	0–3	2–2	2–2	2–2	0–0	0–3	2–4	1–1	2–1	2–2	1–2	3–1	2–1	2–3	3–1	2–2	1–0	3–1	1–4	1–1	5–1	2–2	0–2	2–2	2–0
Loudoun United FC (LDN)	NSH	MEM	TBR	OTT	NYR	BHM	BST	CLT	HFD	SPR	LOU	IND	ATL	STL	NCA	IND	LOU	ATL	CLT	CHS	OTT	PGH	BHM	NCA	HFD	MEM	BST	SPR	NSH	PGH	TBR	STL	CHS	NYR
Loudoun United FC (LDN)	0–2	1–1	0–0	0–2	3–1	0–1	3–3	3–1	1–2	3–2	1–2	1–2	2–1	2–2	0–3	0–2	3–0	2–4	3–3	1–2	1–3	0–1	1–1	4–0	1–5	1–2	2–5	4–1	0–2	1–2	2–0	4–3	2–1	7–3
Louisville City FC (LOU)	NCA	ATL	HFD	BHM	PGH	TBR	OTT	MEM	SPR	BHM	STL	BST	CHS	LDN	NYR	CLT	IND	NSH	OTT	BST	LDN	CLT	ATL	CHS	NCA	IND	PGH	HFD	NYR	TBR	STL	NSH	SPR	MEM
Louisville City FC (LOU)	1–4	1–0	2–1	2–3	0–1	1–1	1–0	2–1	2–3	3–0	0–0	2–2	4–1	2–1	0–1	1–1	1–1	2–1	1–1	0–1	0–3	1–0	5–1	2–1	1–0	1–1	0–0	1–0	5–3	2–2	1–0	1–2	8–3	2–1
Memphis 901 FC (MEM)	TBR	LDN	BST	NYR	NCA	ATL	NSH	CHS	LOU	BHM	HFD	SPR	IND	OTT	CLT	HFD	NSH	NYR	OTT	PGH	STL	NCA	BHM	TBR	ATL	SPR	LDN	STL	PGH	BST	IND	CLT	CHS	LOU
Memphis 901 FC (MEM)	0–1	1–1	1–0	2–3	1–1	0–1	0–2	0–1	1–2	2–2	2–1	2–2	0–3	0–0	0–1	4–1	0–2	2–2	2–0	0–4	0–0	1–2	0–1	0–5	2–1	4–2	2–1	1–0	0–1	5–0	0–3	1–2	0–2	1–2
Nashville SC (NSH)	LDN	STL	NYR	OTT	MEM	CHS	PGH	ATL	TBR	SPR	CLT	BHM	IND	BST	HFD	OTT	NCA	LOU	MEM	IND	SPR	HFD	BST	CLT	NYR	CHS	TBR	STL	BHM	PGH	LDN	LOU	NCA	ATL
Nashville SC (NSH)	2–0	0–1	1–1	3–0	2–0	1–3	2–2	2–0	0–1	5–1	1–1	1–0	0–0	4–1	3–2	3–3	0–1	1–2	2–0	2–0	2–0	4–0	0–0	3–1	1–2	2–1	2–1	0–1	1–0	0–0	2–0	2–1	2–0	3–0
New Mexico United (NMU)	FRE	PHX	TUL	OCO	TAC	RGV	SLC	RNO	POR	SAN	ELP	COS	AUS	OKC	SAC	LVL	LAG	SLC	FRE	SAC	ELP	AUS	POR	LAG	SAN	OCO	OKC	COS	RNO	PHX	RGV	TUL	TAC	LVL
New Mexico United (NMU)	1–1	3–3	2–1	2–2	2–1	0–0	5–1	1–2	3–3	3–0	2–2	3–1	3–1	1–1	0–3	1–5	1–1	0–1	1–2	2–1	3–0	2–2	2–3	2–2	0–5	0–2	3–1	3–1	1–3	2–2	1–1	1–2	1–1	2–0
New York Red Bulls II (NYR)	SPR	NSH	MEM	CLT	HFD	LDN	IND	BHM	OTT	TBR	NCA	BST	ATL	LOU	PGH	CHS	OTT	BST	ATL	MEM	TBR	STL	HFD	PGH	NSH	SPR	IND	CLT	STL	LOU	CHS	NCA	BHM	LDN
New York Red Bulls II (NYR)	3–1	1–1	3–2	2–1	4–0	1–3	2–1	5–0	1–1	0–2	1–2	4–0	3–1	1–0	0–3	1–1	1–1	4–3	8–1	2–2	2–0	2–0	5–1	1–2	2–1	5–1	0–1	2–0	0–2	3–5	1–1	0–2	1–2	3–7
North Carolina FC (NCA)	LOU	BST	CHS	MEM	ATL	CLT	HFD	IND	OTT	BHM	NYR	HFD	TBR	SPR	STL	NSH	CLT	BHM	LDN	PGH	ATL	IND	MEM	PGH	TBR	LOU	LDN	BST	SPR	CHS	OTT	NYR	NSH	STL
North Carolina FC (NCA)	4–1	1–0	1–1	1–1	1–2	3–0	4–1	0–0	1–2	0–0	2–1	1–1	3–1	2–0	2–2	1–0	1–1	0–1	3–0	0–1	4–2	1–2	2–1	5–0	4–2	0–1	0–4	3–3	0–1	1–2	3–1	2–0	0–2	1–0
Oklahoma City Energy (OKC)	ELP	LVL	SAC	RNO	POR	RGV	OCO	TUL	TAC	AUS	SLC	COS	LAG	NMU	FRS	SAN	PHX	LVL	ELP	RNO	COS	TAC	TUL	FRS	POR	AUS	SLC	NMU	SAN	SAC	LAG	OCO	RGV	PHX
Oklahoma City Energy (OKC)	3–1	2–1	1–4	3–3	2–3	1–2	1–0	1–1	2–1	1–2	1–1	1–0	0–0	1–1	1–1	1–1	1–4	1–0	1–1	2–3	0–1	2–0	1–1	1–2	4–2	4–2	2–2	1–3	1–3	0–0	1–5	0–2	0–2	1–3
Orange County SC (OCO)	RNO	TUL	NMU	ELP	COS	TAC	OKC	FRS	PHX	SAN	AUS	LAG	RGV	LVL	PHX	POR	LAG	COS	AUS	SAN	RNO	SAC	TAC	LVL	SLC	NMU	POR	ELP	TUL	RGV	OKC	SLC	SAC	FRS
Orange County SC (OCO)	2–2	3–5	2–2	0–2	2–0	4–0	0–1	2–2	2–1	0–0	2–2	2–2	2–1	1–1	0–3	0–2	1–2	2–1	2–3	0–0	4–1	0–0	1–2	3–0	3–1	2–0	2–1	2–0	1–0	0–2	2–0	0–2	3–2	2–0
Ottawa Fury FC (OTT)	CHS	BHM	NSH	LDN	LOU	ATL	NYR	NCA	BST	HFD	CLT	PGH	MEM	NSH	CHS	TBR	NYR	LOU	SPR	MEM	BHM	LDN	STL	PGH	STL	ATL	IND	TBR	HFD	NCA	IND	SPR	BST	CLT
Ottawa Fury FC (OTT)	1–1	1–0	0–3	2–0	0–1	2–0	1–1	2–1	3–0	1–1	4–1	2–2	0–0	3–3	3–2	1–2	1–1	1–1	4–0	0–2	0–0	3–1	2–1	0–4	0–1	2–3	0–2	1–0	4–1	1–3	1–0	2–1	1–1	1–3
Phoenix Rising FC (PHX)	SAN	NMU	COS	FRS	ELP	AUS	TAC	SAC	OCO	RGV	LVL	SLC	TUL	OCO	RNO	OKC	POR	RGV	AUS	TUL	LAG	ELP	RNO	SAC	TAC	COS	SAN	LVL	LAG	FRS	NMU	POR	SLC	OKC
Phoenix Rising FC (PHX)	3–3	3–3	2–2	0–0	2–0	0–1	4–0	0–0	1–2	3–1	4–0	4–2	5–0	3–0	3–0	4–1	4–2	1–0	6–0	1–0	3–2	2–1	4–2	2–1	4–2	3–0	1–0	1–0	4–1	1–2	2–2	5–3	1–2	3–1
Pittsburgh Riverhounds (PGH)	TBR	SPR	BST	LOU	HFD	STL	NSH	CHS	CLT	IND	OTT	ATL	NYR	BHM	BST	CLT	TBR	NCA	HFD	MEM	SPR	NYR	NCA	LDN	OTT	LOU	CHS	NSH	MEM	IND	LDN	ATL	STL	BHM
Pittsburgh Riverhounds (PGH)	0–2	2–2	2–2	1–0	3–1	0–0	2–2	2–2	0–0	1–2	2–2	5–0	3–0	4–1	1–0	0–1	1–1	1–0	4–2	4–0	3–2	2–1	0–5	1–0	4–0	0–0	1–0	0–0	1–0	3–0	2–1	1–1	1–0	1–0
Portland Timbers 2 (POR)	TUL	SAN	LVL	LAG	OKC	SAC	COS	NMU	RGV	TAC	ELP	SLC	AUS	FRE	OCO	RNO	PHX	TUL	SAC	FRE	LAG	COS	NMU	OKC	LVL	RNO	OCO	SLC	TAC	AUS	PHX	SAN	ELP	RGV
Portland Timbers 2 (POR)	1–1	3–1	3–1	2–3	3–2	1–0	2–2	3–3	1–2	4–1	1–1	2–1	2–2	2–2	2–0	1–2	2–4	1–1	0–1	1–2	1–2	2–2	3–2	2–4	0–1	3–1	1–2	1–5	6–3	1–2	3–5	3–4	1–4	1–2
Real Monarchs (SLC)	SAC	ELP	LAG	LVL	RNO	NMU	SAN	AUS	FRS	OKC	PHX	POR	RGV	COS	TUL	NMU	TAC	ELP	SAN	COS	TUL	FRS	OCO	OKC	LVL	LAG	POR	TAC	RGV	RNO	OCO	PHX	AUS	SAC
Real Monarchs (SLC)	1–1	0–0	5–0	0–1	3–1	1–5	3–2	2–3	2–4	1–1	2–4	1–2	5–3	2–1	3–1	1–0	5–0	0–0	1–3	1–0	4–1	1–1	1–3	2–2	2–2	1–3	5–1	4–1	1–3	2–1	2–0	2–1	2–2	3–0
Reno 1868 FC (RNO)	OCO	AUS	FRS	OKC	SLC	COS	NMU	ELP	TUL	SAC	TAC	LVL	SAN	LAG	PHX	POR	SAC	RGV	OKC	LAG	OCO	COS	RGV	SAN	PHX	POR	FRS	TAC	AUS	NMU	SLC	ELP	LVL	TUL
Reno 1868 FC (RNO)	2–2	2–1	1–1	3–3	1–3	2–0	2–1	0–1	2–2	4–1	1–1	4–0	2–3	4–2	0–3	2–1	2–0	4–0	3–2	2–1	1–4	4–0	2–1	1–4	2–4	1–3	2–3	5–0	2–1	3–1	1–2	0–0	2–0	3–0
Rio Grande Valley Toros (RGV)	TAC	FRS	ELP	TUL	NMU	OKC	LVL	LAG	POR	PHX	LAG	SAN	OCO	SLC	COS	AUS	RNO	TAC	PHX	SAC	LVL	RNO	COS	SAN	ELP	AUS	TUL	SAC	FRS	SLC	OCO	NMU	OKC	POR
Rio Grande Valley Toros (RGV)	0–1	0–2	2–2	1–2	0–0	2–1	5–2	4–4	2–1	1–3	2–2	3–1	1–2	3–5	3–0	0–1	0–4	0–0	0–1	2–1	1–2	1–2	3–3	2–2	1–0	0–3	0–1	1–2	0–5	3–1	2–0	1–1	2–0	2–1
Sacramento Republic (SAC)	SLC	COS	OKC	TAC	AUS	POR	PHX	LVL	FRS	RNO	ELP	SAN	NMU	TUL	RNO	FRS	POR	RGV	NMU	OCO	SAN	LVL	COS	PHX	LAG	TAC	AUS	RGV	OKC	ELP	LAG	TUL	OCO	SLC
Sacramento Republic (SAC)	1–1	1–0	4–1	1–2	1–0	0–1	0–0	2–4	1–0	1–4	1–3	2–1	3–0	6–0	0–2	0–1	1–0	1–2	1–2	0–0	3–2	0–0	4–0	1–2	0–1	3–0	2–1	2–1	0–0	1–2	2–2	3–2	2–3	0–3
San Antonio FC (SAN)	PHX	POR	COS	AUS	LVL	LAG	SLC	TAC	NMU	OCO	TUL	RGV	SAC	RNO	OKC	FRS	ELP	AUS	ELP	OCO	SLC	SAC	RNO	RGV	NMU	TAC	PHX	OKC	LAG	TUL	FRS	LVL	POR	COS
San Antonio FC (SAN)	3–3	1–3	0–1	0–1	2–1	2–0	2–3	3–0	0–3	0–0	1–1	1–3	1–2	3–2	1–1	2–3	0–0	3–0	3–1	0–0	3–1	2–3	4–1	2–2	5–0	1–5	0–1	3–1	1–1	3–4	2–1	2–4	4–3	2–2
Saint Louis FC (STL)	IND	NSH	TBR	CLT	ATL	BHM	PGH	SPR	CHS	LOU	HFD	BST	NCA	SPR	LDN	CLT	TBR	BST	NYR	MEM	CHS	IND	OTT	HFD	OTT	NSH	BHM	NYR	MEM	ATL	LOU	LDN	PGH	NCA
Saint Louis FC (STL)	2–1	1–0	1–1	1–0	2–0	2–3	0–0	3–1	0–0	0–0	1–2	1–3	2–2	1–2	2–2	1–2	1–4	3–0	0–2	0–0	1–1	1–2	1–2	3–2	1–0	1–0	2–0	2–0	0–1	1–1	0–1	3–4	0–1	0–1
Swope Park Rangers (SPR)	NYR	PGH	BST	IND	BHM	STL	LOU	NSH	ATL	MEM	TBR	LDN	CLT	NCA	CHS	STL	TBR	HFD	OTT	NSH	PGH	ATL	NYR	BST	MEM	CHS	NCA	CLT	LDN	BHM	HFD	OTT	LOU	IND
Swope Park Rangers (SPR)	1–3	2–2	3–4	1–3	0–0	1–3	3–2	1–5	1–1	2–2	0–1	2–3	0–0	0–2	1–1	2–1	1–3	4–3	0–4	0–2	2–3	1–2	1–5	0–2	2–4	0–0	1–0	3–0	1–4	3–1	2–2	1–2	3–8	1–2
Tacoma Defiance (TAC)	RGV	LAG	TUL	NMU	SAC	OCO	LVL	PHX	SAN	OKC	POR	RNO	FRS	LAG	ELP	COS	AUS	RGV	SLC	LVL	OKC	OCO	ELP	PHX	SAN	SAC	RNO	SLC	POR	TUL	FRS	COS	NMU	AUS
Tacoma Defiance (TAC)	1–0	0–3	0–4	1–2	2–1	0–4	0–5	0–4	0–3	1–2	1–4	1–1	3–3	2–2	1–2	0–3	1–1	0–0	0–5	4–1	0–2	2–1	0–2	2–4	5–1	0–3	0–5	1–4	3–6	1–1	4–1	2–0	1–1	3–1
Tampa Bay Rowdies (TBR)	MEM	PGH	STL	LDN	HFD	LOU	ATL	CLT	IND	NSH	NYR	SPR	BHM	NCA	CHS	BST	OTT	SPR	PGH	STL	NYR	CHS	BHM	NCA	MEM	NSH	CLT	ATL	OTT	BST	LOU	LDN	IND	HFD
Tampa Bay Rowdies (TBR)	1–0	2–0	1–1	0–0	4–0	1–1	4–1	1–1	0–0	1–0	2–0	1–0	2–0	1–3	1–1	2–1	2–1	3–1	1–1	4–1	0–2	5–0	0–1	2–4	5–0	1–2	3–1	1–1	0–1	6–1	2–2	0–2	1–1	1–2
Tulsa Roughnecks (TUL)	POR	OCO	NMU	TAC	RGV	LAG	FRS	COS	OKC	RNO	SAN	LVL	AUS	PHX	ELP	SAC	SLC	POR	COS	LAG	PHX	OKC	SLC	AUS	LVL	FRS	ELP	RGV	OCO	SAN	TAC	SAC	NMU	RNO
Tulsa Roughnecks (TUL)	1–1	5–3	1–2	4–0	2–1	2–4	1–3	2–0	1–1	2–2	1–1	0–0	2–3	0–5	0–2	0–6	1–3	1–1	0–1	1–3	0–1	1–1	1–4	1–5	1–1	2–1	2–2	1–0	0–1	4–3	1–1	2–3	2–1	0–3

== Playoffs ==
=== Format ===
The top 10 teams from each conference will qualify for the playoffs. Each conference will have a "play-in round" where the 7 seed will host the 10 seed and the 8 host 9. The lowest remaining seed will then play the 1 seed and the other play-in survivor will play the 2 seed to form an 8 team playoff bracket. Each of the 8 team playoff brackets will consist of teams within their respective conference and the matches will be hosted by the higher seed. The USL Cup will be the season's only match that involves teams from different conferences; it will be hosted by the conference champion with the better regular-season record.

=== Bracket ===
Eastern Conference Play-In; October 23
7	North Carolina FC	2
10	Birmingham Legion FC	3

Eastern Conference Play-In; October 23
8	Ottawa Fury FC	1(4)
9	Charleston Battery (pen.)	1(5)

Western Conference Play-In; October 23
7	Sacramento Republic	2
10	New Mexico United	1

Western Conference Play-In; October 23
8	Austin Bold FC	2
9	LA Galaxy II	0

Conference Quarterfinals; October 26	Conference Semifinals; November 2–3
1	Pittsburgh Riverhounds SC	7
10	Birmingham Legion FC	0
1	Pittsburgh Riverhounds SC	1
4	Louisville City FC (a.e.t.)	2
4	Louisville City FC	2
5	Tampa Bay Rowdies	1
Eastern Conference
3	Indy Eleven	1
6	New York Red Bulls II	0
3	Indy Eleven	1
2	Nashville SC	0
2	Nashville SC	3
9	Charleston Battery	1
1	Phoenix Rising FC	0(8)
8	Austin Bold FC	0(7)
1	Phoenix Rising FC	1
4	Real Monarchs SLC	2
4	Real Monarchs SLC	6
5	Orange County SC	2
Western Conference
3	Fresno FC	2
6	El Paso Locomotive FC	3
6	El Paso Locomotive FC	3
7	Sacramento Republic	0
2	Reno 1868 FC	1
7	Sacramento Republic	3

Conference Final; November 9
4	Louisville City FC (a.e.t.)	3
3	Indy Eleven	1
4	Real Monarchs SLC (a.e.t.)	2
6	El Paso Locomotive FC	1

USL Championship Final; November 17
4	Louisville City FC	1
4	Real Monarchs SLC	3

=== Eastern Conference ===
October 23, 2019 P-I	North Carolina FC	2–3	Birmingham Legion FC	Cary, North Carolina
7:00 PM EST	Albadawi 19', (yellow card) 40'; Fortune 59', (yellow card) 61'	Report	Hollinger-Janzen 35'; Herivaux 66'; Williams 90+3'	Stadium: Sahlen's Stadium at WakeMed Soccer Park; Attendance: 3,675; Referee: Tim Ford

October 23, 2019 P-I	Ottawa Fury FC	1–1 (a.e.t.) (4–5 p)	Charleston Battery	Ottawa, Ontario
8:00 PM EST	Samb 40'; Fall (yellow card) 117'	Report	Higashi 27'; Marini (yellow card) 116'; Lewis (yellow card) 117'	Stadium: TD Place Stadium; Attendance: 2,427; Referee: David Barrie
	Penalties
	Fall (penalty scored); Haworth (penalty scored); Barry (penalty scored); Samb (penalty missed); Thiago (penalty scored)		(penalty scored) Lewis; (penalty scored) Bosua; (penalty scored) Marini; (penalty scored) Svantesson; (penalty scored) van Schaik

October 26, 2019 QF	Pittsburgh Riverhounds	7–0	Birmingham Legion FC	Pittsburgh, Pennsylvania
7:00 PM EST	Brett 13', 27', 34' (pen.), 71'; Fisher 17' (o.g.); Dover 45+1'; Mertz 62' (pen.); Adewole (yellow card) 77'	Report	Culbertson (yellow card) 31'; Lopez (yellow card) 41'; Herivaux (red card) 61'	Stadium: Highmark Stadium; Attendance: 5,672; Referee: Mark Allatin

October 26, 2019 QF	Nashville SC	3–1	Charleston Battery	Nashville, Tennessee
6:00 PM EDT	Moloto 10'; King (yellow card) 38'; Ríos 43'; Ockford (yellow card) 77'; Davis (yellow card) 85'; Jones 88'	Report	Lewis 35' (pen.)	Stadium: First Tennessee Park; Attendance: 6,253; Referee: Greg Dopka

October 26, 2019 QF	Indy Eleven	1–0	New York Red Bulls II	Indianapolis, Indiana
7:30 PM EDT	Ouimette 27'	Report		Stadium: Carroll Stadium; Attendance: 5,175; Referee: Michael Radchuk

October 26, 2019 QF	Louisville City FC	2–1	Tampa Bay Rowdies	Louisville, Kentucky
7:00 PM EST	Rasmussen 23', 24'; Ownby (yellow card) 56'	Report	Ekra (yellow card) 40'; Diakité (yellow card) 70'; Guenzatti 80'	Stadium: Louisville Slugger Field; Attendance: 4,636; Referee: Farhad Dadkho

November 2, 2019 SF	Pittsburgh Riverhounds SC	1–2 (a.e.t.)	Louisville City FC	Pittsburgh, Pennsylvania
7:00 PM EDT	Vancaeyezeele 11'; Greenspan (yellow card) 48'	Report	Spencer 51', (yellow card) 85'; McMahon (yellow card) 54'; Craig (yellow card) 70'; DelPiccolo 118'	Stadium: Highmark Stadium; Attendance: 6,073; Referee: Michael Radchuk

November 2, 2019 SF	Nashville SC	0–1	Indy Eleven	Nashville, Tennessee
8:00 PM EST	Washington (yellow card) 24'; LaGrassa (yellow card) 81'; Ockford (yellow card) 90+2'	Report	Ayoze (yellow card) 22'; Ouimette (yellow card) 24'; Pasher 59'	Stadium: First Tennessee Park; Attendance: 4,174; Referee: Elton García

November 9, 2019 F	Indy Eleven	1–3 (a.e.t.)	Louisville City FC	Indianapolis, Indiana
8:00 PM EST	Barrett (yellow card) 45+1'; Pasher 67'; Ouimette (yellow card) 90+2'; Hackshaw (yellow card) 102'; Watson (yellow card) 119'	Report	Williams (yellow card) 85'; Thiam (yellow card) 90'; Hoppenot 90+4'; Rasmussen 94'; Ownby (yellow card) 106'; Spencer 113' (pen.)	Stadium: Carroll Stadium; Attendance: 7,171; Referee: Guido Gonzales, Jr.

=== Western Conference ===
October 23, 2019 P-I	Austin Bold FC	2–0	LA Galaxy II	Austin, Texas
9:30 PM EDT	Twumasi 9', (yellow card) 76'; Lima (yellow card) 32'; Soto (yellow card) 49'; McFarlane 54'; Braafheid (yellow card) 60'	Report	Harvey (yellow card) 35'; Hernández (yellow card) 76'; Kamara (yellow card) 77'	Stadium: Bold Stadium; Attendance: 2,656; Referee: Guido Gonzales Jr

October 23, 2019 P-I	Sacramento Republic FC	2–1	New Mexico United	Sacramento, California
10:00 PM EDT	Enevoldsen (yellow card) 44', (goal) 82'; Alemán 45+3'; Villarreal (yellow card) 67'; Werner (yellow card) 90+3'	Report	Sandoval 1'; Padilla (yellow card) 44'; Wehan (yellow card) 64'; Guzmán (yellow card) 69'; Schmidt (yellow card) 90'	Stadium: Papa Murphy's Park; Attendance: 9,907; Referee: Elton Garcia

October 26, 2019 QF	Phoenix Rising FC	0–0 (a.e.t.) (8–7 p)	Austin Bold FC	Scottsdale, Arizona
10:30 PM EDT	Lambert (yellow card) 70'; Jahn (yellow card) 86'	Report	Soto (yellow card) 14'; McFarlane (yellow card) 35'; Guadarrama (yellow card) 68' de Villardi (yellow card) 95'	Stadium: Casino Arizona Field; Attendance: 6,642; Referee: Elvis Osmanovic
	Penalties
	Flemmings (penalty scored); Bakero (penalty scored); Calistri (penalty scored); Lambert (penalty missed); Spencer (penalty scored); Farrell (penalty scored); Johnson (penalty scored); Dia (penalty scored); Cochran (penalty scored)		(penalty scored) Tyrpak; (penalty missed) de Villardi; (penalty scored) McFarlane; (penalty scored) Soto; (penalty scored) Braafheid; (penalty scored) Okugo; (penalty scored) Atuahene; (penalty scored) Twumasi; (penalty missed) Taylor

October 26, 2019 QF	Reno 1868 FC	1–3	Sacramento Republic FC	Reno, Nevada
6:30 PM MDT	Hertzog 5'	Report	Werner 8'; Iwasa 70'; Taintor (yellow card) 73'; Enevoldsen 75'; Skundrich (yellow card) 84'	Stadium: Greater Nevada Field; Attendance: 3,275; Referee: Malik Badawi

October 26, 2019 QF	Fresno FC	2–3	El Paso Locomotive FC	Fresno, California
10:30 PM EDT	Chaney 49'; Strong (yellow card) 51' (red card) 86'; Cooper 55'	Report	Gómez 19'; Kiffe 77'; Velásquez 83' (pen.)	Stadium: Chukchansi Park; Attendance: 5,352; Referee: Lukasz Szpala

October 26, 2019 QF	Real Monarchs SLC	6–2	Orange County SC	Herriman, Utah
12:00 PM MDT	Chang 13'; Martínez 28'; Mulholland (yellow card) 34'; Blake 59', 90'; Schmitt 77'; Holt 81'	Report	Orozco 35', (yellow card) 80'; Forrester (yellow card) 40' (red card) 49'; Hume (yellow card) 67'; Seaton 90+1'	Stadium: Zions Bank Stadium; Attendance: 2,749; Referee: Ismir Pekmic

November 1, 2019 SF	Phoenix Rising FC	1–2	Real Monarchs SLC	Scottsdale, Arizona
10:30 PM EST	Flemmings 25'; Asante (yellow card) 47'	Report	Blake 33', (yellow card) 61'; Chang 43'; Powder (yellow card) 84'	Stadium: Casino Arizona Field; Attendance: 7,548; Referee: Jon Freemon

November 2, 2019 SF	El Paso Locomotive FC	3–0	Sacramento Republic FC	El Paso, Texas
9:30 PM EST	Beckie (yellow card) 25'; Gómez 40'; Ryan (yellow card) 70'; Contreras 83' (pen.); Yuma (yellow card) 86'; Velásquez 88'	Report	Alemán (yellow card) 51'; Enevoldsen (yellow card) 70'; Barahona (yellow card) 87'	Stadium: Southwest University Park; Attendance: 7,460; Referee: Farhad Dadkho

November 9, 2019 F	Real Monarchs SLC	2–1 (a.e.t.)	El Paso Locomotive FC	Herriman, Utah
3:00 PM EST	Schmitt (yellow card) 21'; Ryden 48'; Portillo (yellow card) 88'; Mulholland (yellow card) 90+4'; Holt (yellow card) 116', (goal) 120'	Report	Fox 45+1'; Kiffe (yellow card) 47' (red card) 51'; Gómez (yellow card) 71'	Stadium: Zions Bank Stadium; Attendance: 4,521; Referee: Rosendo Mendoza

=== USL Championship Final ===
November 17, 2019 Final	Louisville City FC	1–3	Real Monarchs SLC	Louisville, Kentucky
7:30 PM EST	Rasmussen 6'; Williams (yellow card) 89'	Report	Holt 25', (yellow card) 69'; Plewa 45'; Schmitt (yellow card) 59'; Powder 66'	Stadium: Lynn Stadium; Attendance: 7,025; Referee: Tim Ford

Championship Game MVP: (Poland) Konrad Plewa (SLC)

== Attendance ==
=== Average home attendances ===
Ranked from highest to lowest average attendance.

Team	GP	Total	High	Low	Average
New Mexico United	17	215,775	15,247	8,330	12,693
Indy Eleven	17	182,481	20,251	8,035	10,734
Sacramento Republic FC	17	177,409	11,569	9,324	10,436
Louisville City FC	17	153,705	12,188	6,811	9,041
Las Vegas Lights FC	17	131,085	10,117	5,101	7,711
Nashville SC	17	118,985	13,047	5,356	6,999
San Antonio FC	17	115,009	8,406	5,704	6,765
Phoenix Rising FC	17	114,789	7,606	6,372	6,752
Memphis 901 FC	17	112,598	8,062	4,142	6,623
El Paso Locomotive FC	17	111,930	8,324	5,015	6,584
Tampa Bay Rowdies	17	93,445	7,851	4,022	5,497
Hartford Athletic	17	85,424	11,346	2,746	5,025
Ottawa Fury FC	17	77,431	6,807	3,094	4,555
Birmingham Legion FC	17	77,365	5,807	3,824	4,551
Saint Louis FC	17	77,038	5,963	3,524	4,532
OKC Energy FC	17	75,514	6,549	3,096	4,442
Reno 1868 FC	17	73,325	5,112	2,919	4,313
North Carolina FC	17	70,008	6,172	2,833	4,118
Fresno FC	17	69,988	7,863	2,343	4,117
Colorado Springs Switchbacks FC	17	68,091	5,606	2,702	4,005
Rio Grande Valley FC	17	64,806	4,967	2,408	3,812
Pittsburgh Riverhounds SC	17	63,400	8,391	2,150	3,729
Orange County SC	17	54,258	5,122	1,558	3,192
Tacoma Defiance	17	44,804	5,185	1,396	2,636
Charleston Battery	17	41,211	3,915	1,359	2,424
Austin Bold FC	17	40,714	5,803	1,201	2,395
Tulsa Roughnecks FC	17	34,523	3,260	1,215	2,031
Real Monarchs	17	33,713	2,936	1,036	1,983
Portland Timbers 2	17	32,289	3,513	1,116	1,899
Atlanta United 2	17	29,824	3,109	1,015	1,754
Charlotte Independence	17	29,745	3,544	1,217	1,750
Loudoun United FC	17	23,483	5,015	550	1,381
LA Galaxy II	17	14,970	1,984	535	881
New York Red Bulls II	17	14,476	1,522	467	852
Swope Park Rangers	17	8,585	1,565	214	505
Bethlehem Steel FC	17	8,127	1,537	219	478
Total	612	2,740,323	20,251	214	4,478

Updated to games of October 20, 2019.
Sources: USL Championship Soccer Stadium Digest

== Statistical leaders ==
=== Top scorers ===
Rank	Player	Nation	Club	Goals
1	Solomon Asante	GHA	Phoenix Rising FC	22
2	Daniel Ríos	MEX	Nashville SC	20
3	Sebastián Guenzatti	URU	Tampa Bay Rowdies	18
3	Corey Hertzog	USA	Reno 1868 FC	18
5	Adam Jahn	USA	Phoenix Rising FC	17
6	Cameron Iwasa	USA	Sacramento Republic	16
6	Douglas Martínez	HON	Real Monarchs	16
8	Deshorn Brown	JAM	OKC Energy FC	15
8	Junior Flemmings	JAM	Phoenix Rising FC	15
8	Irvin Parra	USA	Las Vegas Lights FC	15
8	Jared Stroud	USA	New York Red Bulls II	15

=== Top assists ===
Rank	Player	Nation	Club	Assists
1	Solomon Asante	GHA	Phoenix Rising FC	17
2	Rodrigo da Costa	BRA	Tulsa Roughnecks FC	13
3	Sean McFarlane	JAM	Austin Bold FC	12
4	Leo Fernandes	BRA	Tampa Bay Rowdies	10
4	Lebo Moloto	RSA	Nashville SC	10
6	Kenardo Forbes	JAM	Pittsburgh Riverhounds SC	9
6	Enzo Martinez	URU	Charlotte Independence	9
6	Jared Stroud	USA	New York Red Bulls II	9
6	Eryk Williamson	USA	Portland Timbers 2	9
10	Malik Johnson	CAN	Tampa Bay Rowdies	8
10	Isidro Martinez	USA	Rio Grande Valley FC	8
10	Raúl Mendiola	MEX	Reno 1868 FC	8
10	Walter Restrepo	COL	San Antonio FC	8

=== Shutouts ===
Rank	Player	Nation	Club	Shutouts
1	Matt Pickens	USA	Nashville SC	14
2	Zac Lubin	USA	Phoenix Rising FC	13
2	Kyle Morton	USA	Pittsburgh Riverhounds SC	13
4	Logan Ketterer	USA	El Paso Locomotive FC	12
5	Matt Van Oekel	USA	Birmingham Legion FC	11
6	John McCarthy	USA	Tampa Bay Rowdies	10
7	Evan Newton	USA	Indy Eleven	9
7	Thomas Olsen	USA	Las Vegas Lights	9
9	Callum Irving	CAN	Ottawa Fury FC	8
9	Joe Kuzminsky	USA	Charleston Battery	8
9	Diego Restrepo	USA	Austin Bold FC	8
9	Alex Tabakis	GRE	North Carolina FC	8

=== Hat-tricks ===
Player	Nation	Club	Against	Result	Date
Shane Malcolm	GUM	Colorado Springs Switchbacks	LA Galaxy II	4–1	March 9
Romario Williams	JAM	Atlanta United 2	Charlotte Independence	3–3	March 23
Cameron Iwasa	USA	Sacramento Republic	OKC Energy FC	4–1	March 24
Santi Moar	ESP	New Mexico United	Real Monarchs	5–1	April 13
Irvin Parra	USA	Las Vegas Lights	Tacoma Defiance	5–0	April 13
Michael Salazar	BLZ	Rio Grande Valley FC	LA Galaxy II	4–4	April 24
Kevaughn Frater	JAM	New Mexico United	Portland Timbers 2	3–3	April 26
Kevaughn Frater	JAM	New Mexico United	Colorado Springs Switchbacks	3–1	May 18
Kris Tyrpak	USA	Austin Bold FC	Tulsa Roughnecks	3–2	June 1
Elliot Collier	NZL	Memphis 901 FC	Hartford Athletic	4–1	July 6
Douglas Martínez	HON	Real Monarchs	Tacoma Defiance	5–0	July 12
Chris Lema	USA	New York Red Bulls II	Atlanta United 2	8–1	July 13
Bienvenue Kanakimana	BDI	Atlanta United 2	Loudoun United	4–2	August 2
Danny Musovski	MKD	Reno 1868 FC	Tacoma Defiance	5–0	September 10
Douglas Martínez	HON	Real Monarchs	Portland Timbers 2	5–1	September 14
Devon Sandoval	USA	New Mexico United	Colorado Springs Switchbacks	3–1	September 14
Hadji Barry	GUI	Ottawa Fury FC	Hartford Athletic	4–1	September 22
Kléber	BRA	Austin Bold FC	Las Vegas Lights FC	4–1	September 22
Gordon Wild	GER	Loudoun United	Swope Park Rangers	4–1	September 25
Éver Guzmán	MEX	San Antonio FC	Portland Timbers 2	4–3	October 11

Scored four goals.

== League awards ==
=== Individual awards ===
Award	Winner	Team	Reason	Ref.
Golden Boot	(Ghana) Solomon Asante	Phoenix Rising FC	22 Goals	
Golden Glove	(United States) Matt Pickens	Nashville SC	0.64 Goals against average; 14 Shutouts	
Assists Champion	(Ghana) Solomon Asante	Phoenix Rising FC	17 Assists - USL Championship Record	
Coach of the Year	(United States) Rick Schantz	Phoenix Rising FC	20 straight victories, USLC / North American Record	
Goalkeeper of the Year	(United States) Matt Pickens	Nashville SC	14 Shutouts; 79.8 Save percentage	
Defender of the Year	(United States) Joe Greenspan	Pittsburgh Riverhounds SC	69.4 percent of duels and 75 percent of aerial duels	
Young Player of the Year	(Argentina) Cristian Parano	San Antonio FC	7 Goals; 6 Assists; 53 Key Passes	
Most Valuable Player	(Ghana) Solomon Asante	Phoenix Rising FC	39 Goals & Assists, USLC Record	
Goal of the Year	(Nigeria) Tobenna Uzo	Tulsa Roughnecks FC	Bicycle Kick vs New Mexico United	
Save of the Year	(United States) Joe Kuzminsky	Charleston Battery	vs Nashville SC	

=== All-League Teams ===
First team
Goalkeeper	Defenders	Midfielders	Forwards
(United States) Matt Pickens (NSH)	(Trinidad and Tobago) Neveal Hackshaw (IND) (United States) Joe Greenspan (PGH) (United States) Forrest Lasso (NSH) (United States) Oscar Jimenez (LOU)	(United States) Jared Stroud (NYR) (Denmark) Magnus Rasmussen (LOU) (Jamaica) Kenardo Forbes (PGH)	(Mexico) Daniel Rios (NSH) (United States) Adam Jahn (PHX) (Ghana) Solomon Asante (PHX)

Second team
Goalkeeper	Defenders	Midfielders	Forwards
(United States) Zac Lubin (PHX)	(French Guiana) Thomas Vancaeyezeele (PGH) (Senegal) Papé Diakité (TBR) (England) Paco Craig (LOU) (United States) A.J. Cochran (PHX)	(Spain) Santi Moar (NMU) (United States) Chris Lema (NYR) (Brazil) Rodrigo da Costa (TUL)	(Uruguay) Sebastián Guenzatti (TBR) (United States) Corey Hertzog (RNO) (Jamaica) Neco Brett (PGH)

=== Monthly awards ===
Month	Player of the Month			Goal of the Month			Save of the Month		Coach of the Month		References
Month	Player	Club	Position	Player	Club	Position	Player	Club	Coach	Club	References
March	(Spain) Santi Moar	New Mexico United	Forward	(Spain) Santi Moar	New Mexico United	Forward	(United States) Carl Woszczynski	Phoenix Rising FC	(Nigeria) Michael Nsien	Tulsa Roughnecks FC	
April	(Jamaica) Kevaughn Frater	New Mexico United	Forward	(Jamaica) Kevaughn Frater	New Mexico United	Forward	(Greece) Alex Tambakis	North Carolina FC	(Scotland) Neill Collins	Tampa Bay Rowdies	
May	(United States) Jerome Kiesewetter	El Paso Locomotive FC	Forward	(United States) Connor Presley	Loudoun United FC	Midfielder	(Greece) Alex Tambakis	North Carolina FC	(United States) Troy Lesesne	New Mexico United	
June	(Ghana) Solomon Asante	Phoenix Rising FC	Forward	(United States) Chandler Hoffman	Birmingham Legion FC	Forward	(Greece) Alex Tambakis	North Carolina FC	(United States) Rick Schantz	Phoenix Rising FC	
July	(United States) Corey Hertzog	Reno 1868 FC	Forward	(United States) Arun Basuljevic	Fresno FC	Midfielder	(United States) Joe Kuzminsky	Charleston Battery	(United States) Tom Soehn	Birmingham Legion FC	
August	(Ghana) Solomon Asante	Phoenix Rising FC	Forward	(Brazil) Rodrigo da Costa	Tulsa Roughnecks FC	Midfielder	(United States) Cody Mizell	New Mexico United	(United States) Rick Schantz	Phoenix Rising FC	
September	(United States) Devon Sandoval	New Mexico United	Forward	(Republic of Ireland) Niall McCabe	Louisville City FC	Midfielder	(Greece) Alex Tambakis	North Carolina FC	(United States) Bob Lilley	Pittsburgh Riverhounds	
October	(United States) Kyle Murphy	Loudoun United FC	Forward	(Nigeria) Tobenna Uzo	Tulsa Roughnecks FC	Forward	(Greece) Alex Tambakis	North Carolina FC	(Colombia) Jámison Olave	Real Monarchs	

=== Weekly awards ===
Player of the Week
Week	Player	Club	Position	Reason
1	(Guam) Shane Malcolm	Colorado Springs Switchbacks	Forward	Hat Trick vs LA Galaxy II
2	(Jamaica) Brian Brown	Reno 1868 FC	Forward	2G vs Austin
3	(United States) Cameron Iwasa	Sacramento Republic FC	Forward	Hat Trick vs OKC Energy
4	(United States) Abraham Rodriguez	Colorado Springs Switchbacks	Goalkeeper	11 Saves vs Phoenix
5	(Netherlands) Kai Koreniuk	LA Galaxy II	Midfielder	2G 1A
6	(Spain) Santi Moar	New Mexico United	Midfielder	Hat Trick vs Real Monarchs
7	(Jamaica) Dane Kelly	Indy Eleven	Forward	3G 1A
8	(Jamaica) Kevaughn Frater	New Mexico United	Forward	Hat Trick vs Portland
9	(United States) Evan Newton	Indy Eleven	Goalkeeper	2 Shutouts
10	(United States) Adam Jahn	Phoenix Rising FC	Forward	2G vs Rio Grande
11	(Jamaica) Kevaughn Frater	New Mexico United	Forward	Hat Trick vs Colorado Springs
12	(United States) Matt Pickens	Nashville SC	Goalkeeper	2 Shutouts; 6 Saves
13	(United States) Kris Tyrpak	Austin Bold FC	Forward	Hat Trick vs Tulsa
14	(Trinidad and Tobago) Dre Fortune	North Carolina FC	Midfielder	2G vs Tampa Bay
15	(Cape Verde) Steevan Dos Santos	Pittsburgh Riverhounds	Forward	1G 1A vs Atlanta
16	(Ghana) Solomon Asante	Phoenix Rising FC	Forward	3G 1A
17	(United States) Christian Sorto	Loudoun United FC	Forward	2G in Pro Debut
18	(New Zealand) Elliot Collier	Memphis 901 FC	Forward	Hat Trick vs Hartford
19	(Honduras) Douglas Martinez	Real Monarchs	Forward	Hat Trick vs Tacoma
20	(El Salvador) Tomas Romero	Bethlehem Steel FC	Goalkeeper	11 Save Shutout
21	(United States) Steven Miller	North Carolina FC	Midfielder	2G 1A vs Atlanta
22	(Burundi) Bienvenue Kanakimana	Atlanta United 2	Forward	Hat Trick vs Loudoun United
23	(Argentina) Cristian Parano	San Antonio FC	Midfielder	2G vs Reno
24	(Trinidad and Tobago) Dre Fortune	North Carolina FC	Midfielder	2G 1A vs Pittsburgh
25	(Argentina) Cristian Parano	San Antonio FC	Midfielder	2G 2A vs New Mexico
26	(Jamaica) Neco Brett	Pittsburgh Riverhounds	Forward	2G 1A vs Ottawa
27	(Mexico) Josué Gómez	El Paso Locomotive FC	Midfielder	3 Goals
28	(United States) Danny Musovski	Reno 1868 FC	Forward	4 Goals vs Tacoma
29	(United States) Jaime Chavez	Fresno FC	Forward	3G 1A
30	(Jamaica) Kenardo Forbes	Pittsburgh Riverhounds	Midfielder	2G vs Indy
31	(United States) JT Marcinkowski	Reno 1868 FC	Goalkeeper	9 Save Shutout vs El Paso
32	(Mexico) Éver Guzmán	San Antonio FC	Forward	Hat Trick vs Portland
33	(Bermuda) Zeiko Lewis	Charleston Battery	Midfielder	1G 2A

Goal of the Week
Week	Player	Club	Opponent
1	(Honduras) Christian Altamirano	Tulsa Roughnecks	Portland Timbers 2
2	(Spain) Santi Moar	New Mexico United	Phoenix Rising FC
3	(Colombia) Dairon Asprilla	Portland Timbers 2	Las Vegas Lights
4	(United States) Tommy McCabe	North Carolina FC	Charleston Battery
5	(Bermuda) Zeiko Lewis	Charleston Battery	Charlotte Independence
6	(Colombia) José Angulo	Hartford Athletic	Pittsburgh Riverhounds
7	(United States) Sonny Guadarrama	Austin Bold FC	Phoenix Rising FC
8	(Jamaica) Kevaughn Frater	New Mexico United	Portland Timbers 2
9	(Honduras) Junior Sandoval	Las Vegas Lights FC	Sacramento Republic FC
10	(United States) Mitchell Taintor	Sacramento Republic FC	Reno 1868 FC
11	(United States) Justin Dhillon	Tacoma Defiance	Reno 1868 FC
12	(United States) Shandon Hopeau	Tacoma Defiance	Fresno FC
13	(United States) Robert Coronado	Rio Grande Valley FC	Orange County SC
14	(United States) Adam Jahn	Phoenix Rising FC	Tulsa Roughnecks FC
15	(United States) Andrew Lubahn	Loudoun United FC	Indy Eleven
16	(United States) Chandler Hoffman	Birmingham Legion FC	Hartford Athletic
17	(United States) Paolo DelPiccolo	Louisville City FC	Indy Eleven
18	(New Zealand) Elliot Collier	Memphis 901 FC	Hartford Athletic
19	(United States) Adam Jahn	Phoenix Rising FC	Rio Grande Valley FC
20	(United States) Arun Basuljevic	Fresno FC	Portland Timbers 2
21	(England) Daniel Bruce	New Mexico United	Sacramento Republic FC
22	(United States) Chris Wehan	New Mexico United	El Paso Locomotive FC
23	(Denmark) Sebastian Dalgaard	Hartford Athletic	New York Red Bulls II
24	(Mexico) Edson Partida	El Paso Locomotive FC	Tacoma Defiance
25	(Saudi Arabia) Faris Abdi	Austin Bold FC	OKC Energy FC
26	(Brazil) Rodrigo da Costa	Tulsa Roughnecks	Fresno FC
27	(United States) Devon Sandoval	New Mexico United	OKC Energy FC
28	(United States) Devon Sandoval	New Mexico United	Colorado Springs Switchbacks
29	(Republic of Ireland) Niall McCabe	Louisville City FC	New York Red Bulls II
30	(United States) Devon Sandoval	New Mexico United	Phoenix Rising FC
31	(United States) Wilson Harris	Swope Park Rangers	Bethlehem Steel FC
32	(Nigeria) Tobenna Uzo	Tulsa Roughnecks	New Mexico United
33	(Poland) Wojciech Wojcik	Hartford Athletic	Tampa Bay Rowdies

Save of the Week
Week	Goalkeeper	Club	Opponent
1	(United States) Carl Woszczynski	Phoenix Rising FC	San Antonio FC
2	(United States) David Ochoa	Real Monarchs SLC	El Paso Locomotive FC
3	(United States) Aaron Cervantes	Orange County SC	New Mexico United
4	(United States) Carl Woszczynski	Phoenix Rising FC	Colorado Springs Switchbacks
5	(Greece) Alex Tambakis	North Carolina FC	Memphis 901 FC
6	(United States) Dylan Castanheira	Atlanta United 2	Memphis 901 FC
7	(England) Curtis Anderson	Charlotte Independence	North Carolina FC
8	(United States) Cody Mizell	New Mexico United	Portland Timbers 2
9	(United States) Cody Mizell	New Mexico United	San Antonio FC
10	(United States) Matt Cardone	San Antonio FC	Orange County SC
11	(United States) Cody Mizell	New Mexico United	Colorado Springs Switchbacks
12	(Greece) Alex Tambakis	North Carolina FC	New York Red Bulls II
13	(United States) Joe Kuzminsky	Charleston Battery	Louisville City FC
14	(Canada) Callum Irving	Ottawa Fury FC	Pittsburgh Riverhounds
15	(United States) Eric Dick	Swope Park Rangers	North Carolina FC
16	(Greece) Alex Tambakis	North Carolina FC	Saint Louis FC
17	(United States) C.J. Cochran	Fresno FC	El Paso Locomotive FC
18	(United States) Diego Restrepo	Austin Bold FC	San Antonio FC
19	(United States) Aaron Cervantes	Orange County SC	Austin Bold FC
20	(United States) Joe Kuzminsky	Charleston Battery	Hartford Athletic
21	(United States) Diego Restrepo	Austin Bold FC	Fresno FC
22	(United States) Chris Hubbard	Louisville City FC	Charlotte Independence
23	(United States) Eric Lopez	LA Galaxy II	Austin Bold FC
24	(United States) Cody Mizell	New Mexico United	LA Galaxy II
25	(United States) Aaron Cervantes	Orange County SC	Real Monarchs
26	(United States) Ben Willis	Rio Grande Valley FC	Austin Bold FC
27	(United States) Diego Restrepo	Austin Bold FC	Colorado Springs Switchbacks
28	(United States) Kendall McIntosh	Portland Timbers 2	Real Monarchs
29	(United States) C. J. Cochran	Fresno FC	Phoenix Rising FC
30	(Greece) Alex Tambakis	North Carolina FC	Ottawa Fury FC
31	(Greece) Alex Tambakis	North Carolina FC	New York Red Bulls II
32	(United States) Andrew Putna	Real Monarchs	Phoenix Rising FC
33	(United States) Trey Muse	Tacoma Defiance	New Mexico United

Team of the Week
Week	Goalkeeper	Defenders	Midfielders	Forwards	Bench
**1**	(United States) Moore (ATL)	(Democratic Republic of the Congo) Kavita (STL) (Senegal) Diakité (TBR) (Scotland) Cooper (FRS)	(United States) Zandi (BST) (United States) McCabe (NCA) (Guam) **Malcolm** (COL) (Turks and Caicos Islands) Forbes (SAN)	(United States) Barlow (NYR) (Jamaica) Brown (OKC) (United States) Sandoval (NMU)	(United States) Burt (COL) (United States) Epps (NYR) (Jamaica) Flemmings (PHX) (United States) Hopeau (TAC) (United States) LaGrassa (NSH) (Netherlands) Lomis (NCA) (United States) Ochoa (SLC)
**2**	(United States) Ochoa (SLC)	(Brazil) Lobo (TUL) (Puerto Rico) Barry (TBR) (Canada) Gee (STL)	(Spain) Moar (NMU) (United States) Basuljevic (FRS) (Ghana) Asante (PHX) (United States) Walker (IND)	(Costa Rica) Loria (POR) (Jamaica) **Brown** (RNO) (Sierra Leone) Williams (LAG)	(New Zealand) Collier (MEM) (Brazil) Coronel (BST) (Jamaica) Gordon (OKC) (Bermuda) Lewis (CHS) (Netherlands) Lomis (NCA) (Canada) Meilleur-Giguère (OTT) (United States) Yow (LDN)
**3**	(United States) Cochran (FRS)	(United States) Tribbett (NSH) (Brazil) Lobo (TUL) (United States) Charpie (MEM)	(Cuba) Chang (SLC) (Spain) Moar (NMU) (Denmark) Rasmussen (LOU) (Colombia) Asprilla (POR) (Scotland) Ross (ELP)	(United States) **Iwasa** (SAC) (Jamaica) Williams (ATL)	(Venezuela) Casseres (NYR) (Brazil) da Costa (TUL) (Jamaica) Forbes (PIT) (El Salvador) Hernandez (RGV) (Uruguay) Martinez (CLT) (United States) Rawls (COL) (Honduras) Romero (COL)
**4**	(United States) **Rodriguez** (COL)	(United States) Hilliard-Arce (LAG) (Spain) Ayoze (IND) (United States) Robinson (LVL)	(United States) Williamson (POR) (Mexico) Baez (AUS) (Argentina) Cuello (LAG) (United States) Bastidas (TUL)	(Mexico) Partida (ELP) (Canada) Wright (BHM) (Jamaica) Gordon (OKC)	(United States) Avila (BHM) (Spain) Bakero (PHX) (United States) Calixtro (POR) (England) Hilton (STL) (United States) McCabe (NCA) (United States) Olsen (LVL) (United States) Stroud (NYR)
**5**	(Greece) Tambakis (NCA)	(United States) Fink (STL) (United States) Ofeimu (BST) (Trinidad and Tobago) Archer (CHS)	(Brazil) Fernandes (TBR) (United States) Jones (OCO) (Netherlands) **Koreniuk** (LAG) (United States) Villarreal (SAC)	(Mexico) Ríos (NSH) (Uruguay) Guenzatti (TBR) (Honduras) Martinez (SLC)	(United States) Fenlason (STL) (Argentina) Gómez (SAN) (United States) Greenspan (PIT) (Brazil) Lobo (TUL) (Cameroon) Mbekeli (SPR) (United States) Najem (TBR) (United States) Zubak (LAG)
**6**	(United States) McCarthy (TBR)	(United States) Decas (ATL) (United States) Cochran (PHX) (Ghana) Yaro (SAN)	(Brazil) Johnson (FRS) (Spain) **Moar** (NMU) (Scotland) Kerr (PIT) (United States) Wehan (NMU)	(United States) Parra (LVL) (United States) Williams (BHM) (Poland) Przybylko (BST)	(United States) Barlow (NYR) (United States) Castanheira (ATL) (United States) Culbertson (BHM) (Cameroon) Etaka (LVL) (Ghana) Mensah (NSH) (Cape Verde) Oliveira (OTT) (Brazil) Vinicius (OCO)
**7**	(United States) Restrepo (AUS)	(United States) Ward (LDN) (United States) Lacroix (RNO) (United States) Gutman (CLT)	(United States) Speas (NCA) (Jamaica) Foster (RGV) (United States) van Schaik (CHS) (Jamaica) Flemmings (PHX)	(United States) Langsdorf (POR) (Jamaica) **Kelly** (IND) (Argentina) Gómez (SAN)	(United States) Argueta (COL) (Cuba) Chang (SLC) (England) Craig (LOU) (United States) Fink (STL) (Jamaica) Johnson (PHX) (Puerto Rico) Laurendi (OKC) (Canada) Pasher (IND)
**8**	(England) Anderson (CLT)	(Canada) James (PIT) (Mexico) Guillén (NCA) (Haiti) Jérôme (ELP)	(United States) Cicerone (STL) (Brazil) Fernandes (TBR) (United States) Williamson (POR) (Brazil) da Costa (TUL) (England) Barmby (SAN)	(Jamaica) **Frater** (NMU) (Belize) Salazar (RGV)	(France) Bezecourt (NYR) (Canada) Haworth (OTT) (United States) Kuzminsky (CHS) (Brazil) Lima (AUS) (United States) Miller (NCA) (United States) Tinari (TBR) (United States) Tribbett (NSH)
**9**	(United States) **Newton** (IND)	(United States) Shultz (LAG) (Jamaica) Scarlett (NYR) (United States) Tribbett (NSH)	(Colombia) Cabrera Jr. (RGV) (United States) Johnson (BHM) (Jamaica) Forbes (PIT) (United States) Wehan (NMU)	(United States) Kiesewetter (ELP) (United States) Parra (LVL) (United States) Chaney (FRS)	(Jamaica) Brown (OKC) (United States) Hertzog (RNO) (Denmark) Jørgensen (NYR) (United States) Lee (HAR) (United States) Murphy (LDN) (Democratic Republic of the Congo) Ngalina (BST) (United States) Vom Steeg (LAG)
**10**	(United States) Kuzminsky (CHB)	(Canada) Haworth (OTT) (Senegal) Diakité (TBR) (Ghana) Ackon (SAN)	(Colombia) Asprilla (POR) (Denmark) Rasmussen (LOU) (Brazil) Jackson (FRS) (Trinidad and Tobago) Muckette (MEM)	(United States) Kiesewetter (ELP) (United States) **Jahn** (PHX) (United States) Hertzog (RNO)	(United States) Hamilton (NMU) (United States) Hernandez (SPR) (United States) Parra (LVL) (United States) Pilato (LDN) (Mexico) Rios (NSH) (El Salvador) Romero (BST) (Russia) Saramutin (AUS)
**11**	(United States) Stajduhar (TUL)	(United States) Bahner (STL) (Brazil) Ayoze (IND) (United States) Okugo (AUS)	(United States) Tinari (TBR) (United States) Casiple (RNO) (Haiti) Francois (OTT) (Ghana) Asante (PHX)	(United States) Kiesewetter (ELP) (Jamaica) **Frater** (NMU) (Colombia) Angulo (HAR)	(Jamaica) Foster (RGV) (Jamaica) Lambert (PHX) (United States) Muse (TAC) (Canada) Pasher (IND) (Panama) Tejada (TBR) (Netherlands) van Ewijk (OCO) (England) Wyke (ATL)
**12**	(United States) **Pickens** (NSH)	(Trinidad and Tobago) Hackshaw (IND) (Mexico) Torres (LVL) (New Zealand) Brotherton (NCA) (Trinidad and Tobago) Jones (OKC)	(Spain) Moar (NMU) (Jamaica) Willis (BST) (Spain) Aguinaga (PHX) (Brazil) Fernandes (TBR)	(Belize) Salazar (RGV) (Nigeria) Lawal (FRS)	(France) Bosetti (OKC) (Mexico) Casillas (FRS) (Denmark) Dalgaard (HAR) (United States) Hopeau (TAC) (Bermuda) Lewis (CHS) (United States) Moore (ATL) (United States) Tribbett (NSH)
**13**	(United States) McCarthy (TBR)	(United States) Amico (OCO) (The Gambia) Jome (COS) (Colombia) Rebellón (ELP)	(Canada) Pasher (IND) (United States) Werner (SAC) (Republic of Ireland) McCabe (LOU) (United States) Zajec (NYR)	(United States) **Tyrpak** (AUS) (Jamaica) Brown (RNO) (Senegal) Samb (OTT)	(United States) Dhillon (TAC) (Haiti) François (OTT) (United States) Iloski (LAG) (United States) Lacroix (RNO) (Puerto Rico) Laurendi (OKC) (United States) Swartz (HAR) (United States) Tinari (TBR)
**14**	(United States) Miller (CLT)	(Japan) Kimura (NSH) (The Gambia) Jome (COS) (United States) Kiffe (ELP)	(Denmark) Dalgaard (HAR) (Trinidad and Tobago) **Fortune** (NCA) (United States) Gallegos (SAN) (United States) Lema (NYR)	(Jamaica) Flemmings (PHX) (United States) Iwasa (SAC) (Honduras) Martinez (SLC)	(Ghana) Asante (PHX) (Jamaica) Brown (OKC) (Cuba) Chang (SLC) (Canada) Irving (OTT) (United States) Kiesewetter (ELP) (United States) Walker (IND) (United States) Yow (LDN)
**15**	(United States) Louro (NYR)	(United States) Torre (LVL) (United States) van Schaik (CHS) (United States) Maund (CLT)	(England) Gleadle (RNO) (United States) Johnson (FRS) (United States) Zandi (BST) (Canada) Pasher (IND)	(United States) Salgado (ELP) (Panama) Small (RGV) (Cape Verde) **Dos Santos** (PIT)	(Ghana) Asante (PHX) (England) Barmby (SAN) (Jamaica) Forbes (PIT) (Trinidad and Tobago) Fortune (NCA) (United States) Hubbard (LOU) (England) Lancaster (NSH) (Honduras) Sandoval (LVL)
**16**	(United States) Olsen (LVL)	(England) Richards (TBR) (Costa Rica) Miller (POR) (Trinidad and Tobago) Powder (SLC)	(Germany) Fall (OTT) (United States) Johnson (FRS) (United States) Miller (NCA) (Jamaica) Forbes (PIT)	(United States) Bonomo (SAC) (Ghana) **Asante** (PHX) (United States) Iwasa (SAC)	(Cape Verde) Dos Santos (PIT) (United States) Jahn (PHX) (United States) Lopez (BHM) (United States) Lubin (PHX) (Ghana) Mensah (NSH) (Canada) Pasher (IND) (Jamaica) Taylor (AUS)
**17**	(El Salvador) Romero (BST)	(Canada) Haworth (OTT) (United States) Dia (PHX) (United States) Soto (AUS)	(United States) Speas (NCA) (United States) Mertz (PIT) (Canada) Pasher (IND) (United States) Casiple (RNO)	(United States) **Sorto** (LDN) (Ghana) Asante (PHX) (Cuba) Lopez (LAG)	(Jamaica) Brown (OKC) (Scotland) Kerr (PIT) (Nigeria) Lawal (FRS) (Brazil) Lima (AUS) (United States) Marcinkowski (RNO) (Honduras) Martinez (SLC) (Uruguay) Martínez (CLT)
**18**	(United States) Miller (CLT)	(England) Craig (LOU) (United States) Smith (POR) (Ghana) Kontor (OCO)	(United States) Martin (FRS) (Jamaica) Forbes (PIT) (England) Gleadle (RNO) (Turks and Caicos Islands) Forbes (SAN) (United States) Cicerone (STL)	(Uruguay) Guenzatti (TBR) (New Zealand) **Collier** (MEM)	(United States) Carroll (RNO) (Malawi) Chester (NCA) (Brazil) da Costa (TUL) (United States) Jimenez (LOU) (United States) Ketterer (ELP) (Honduras) Martinez (SLC) (Uruguay) Martinez (CLT)
**19**	(United States) Cochran (FRS)	(United States) Burt (COS) (El Salvador) Barahona (SAC) (Jamaica) McFarlane (AUS)	(United States) Stroud (NYR) (United States) Barrera (HAR) (United States) Lema (NYR) (Uruguay) Martínez (CLT)	(United States) Jahn (PHX) (Honduras) **Martinez** (SLC) (Canada) Wright (BHM)	(Colombia) Angulo (HAR) (United States) Barlow (NYR) (Cuba) Chang (SLC) (United States) Epps (NYR) (Germany) Fall (OTT) (United States) Hubbard (LOU) (United States) Rayyan (BST)
**20**	(El Salvador) **Romero** (BST)	(Canada) Haworth (OTT) (Canada) Laurent (BHM) (The Gambia) Jome (COS)	(Mexico) Mendiola (RNO) (United States) Rowe (SPR) (Malawi) Chester (NCA) (Jamaica) Flemmings (PHX)	(Cuba) Lopez (SAN) (Ghana) Asante (PHX) (Uruguay) Guenzatti (TBR)	(New Zealand) Adams (RGV) (United States) Allen (MEM) (United States) Basuljevic (FRS) (United States) Cardone (SAN) (Denmark) Enevoldsen (IND) (Bermuda) Lewis (CHS) (United States) Winn (NSH)
**21**	(United States) Restrepo (AUS)	(United States) Hyland (OKC) (United States) Lacroix (RNO) (United States) Lopez (BHM)	(United States) Jones (OCO) (United States) **Miller** (NCA) (United States) Bustamante (LDN) (United States) Hernandez (LAG) (United States) Winn (NSH)	(United States) Ocampo-Chavez (TAC) (Denmark) Jørgensen (NYR)	(United States) Greig (STL) (Burundi) Kanakimana (ATL) (Cuba) Lopez (SAN) (United States) Lubin (PHX) (South Africa) Mfeka (RNO) (United States) Velarde (PIT) (United States) Wehan (NMU)
**22**	(Denmark) Due (HAR)	(United States) Jasso (SLC) (United States) Okugo (AUS) (United States) Janjigian (RNO)	(South Africa) Moloto (NSH) (Jamaica) Forbes (PIT) (United States) Elney (NYR) (United States) Wehan (NMU)	(Burundi) **Kanakimana** (ATL) (Zimbabwe) Mkosana (TBR) (United States) Bonomo (SAC)	(United States) Calistri (PHX) (United States) Chavez (FRS) (Dominican Republic) Diaz (SAC) (United States) Dixon (HAR) (Jamaica) Frater (NMU) (Canada) Johnson (TBR) (Lesotho) Matsoso (LOU)
**23**	(United States) Morton (BST)	(United States) Lasso (NSH) (Mexico) del Campo (FRS) (United States) Robinson (LVL)	(United States) Stroud (NYR) (Scotland) Blake (SLC) (Republic of Ireland) McCabe (LOU) (Argentina) **Parano** (SAN) (United States) Mertz (PIT)	(Ghana) Opoku (BRM) (United States) Langsdorf (POR)	(Ghana) Asante (PHX) (United States) Hopeau (TAC) (Mexico) Rios (NSH) (United States) Ryden (SLC) (United States) Speas (NCA) (United States) Van Oekel (BRM) (Panama) Walker (LAG)
**24**	(United States) Ochoa (SLC)	(Canada) Beckie (ELP) (United States) Washington (NSH) (Sierra Leone) Dumbuya (PHX)	(England) Forrester (OCO) (United States) Johnson (BRM) (Haiti) François (OTT) (Trinidad and Tobago) **Fortune** (NCA)	(Brazil) Kléber (AUS) (Denmark) Enevoldsen (SAC) (United States) Eissele (OKC)	(Ghana) Asante (PHX) (Republic of Ireland) Barrett (IND) (United States) Davis (LOU) (Cameroon) Ewolo (NCA) (United States) Greenspan (PIT) (Mexico) Ríos (NSH) (United States) Shuttleworth (SAC)
**25**	(United States) Olsen (LVL)	(United States) Duncan (NYR) (United States) Tribbett (NSH) (Mexico) del Campo (FRS) (Canada) Haworth (OTT)	(Argentina) **Parano** (SAN) (Ghana) Poku (TBR) (United States) Conner (IND) (United States) Stroud (NYR) (United States) Miller (NCA)	(Poland) Wojcik (HAR)	(United States) Bird (RGV) (United States) Garcia (OKC) (United States) Jimenez (LOU) (Canada) Johnson (TBR) (Ghana) Kasim (BRM) (United States) Morton (PIT) (United States) Quinn (OCO)
**26**	(Denmark) Due (OCO)	(United States) Bourgeois (NSH) (United States) Ontiveros (LAG) (Netherlands) Braafheid (AUS)	(United States) Anguiano (POR) (Brazil) Marlon (TUL) (United States) Bustamante (LDN) (Afghanistan) Najem (MEM)	(United States) Jahn (PHX) (Jamaica) **Brett** (PIT) (United States) Dhillon (TAC)	(Ghana) Asante (PHX) (Cape Verde) Dos Santos (PIT) (United States) Greig (STL) (United States) Hopeau (TAC) (Brazil) Lima (AUS) (United States) Morton (BST) (Canada) Pasher (IND)
**27**	(United States) Kuzminsky (CHB)	(United States) Reynolds (STL) (United States) Hilliard-Arce (LAG) (United States) Lopez (BHM)	(Mexico) **Gómez** (ELP) (Brazil) Marlon (TUL) (England) Williams (HAR) (United States) Avila (BHM)	(Denmark) Enevoldsen (SAC) (United States) Dixon (HAR) (United States) Sandoval (NMU)	(United States) Allen (MEM) (United States) Carleton (ATL) (United States) Cicerone (STL) (United States) Jones (OCO) (Ghana) Kasim (BRM) (United States) Lubin (PHX) (Panama) Tejada (TBR)
**28**	(United States) Hubbard (LOU)	(United States) Richards (RNO) (United States) Ledbetter (PHX) (United States) Lindsey (SPR)	(Spain) Ayoze (IND) (United States) Stroud (NYR) (Jamaica) Forbes (PIT) (Argentina) Parano (SAN)	(United States) **Musovski** (RNO) (Honduras) Martinez (SLC) (United States) Sandoval (NMU)	(England) Blackwood (STL) (United States) Dick (SPR) (Jamaica) Flemmings (PHX) (Poland) Formella (SAC) (United States) Quinn (OCO) (United States) Padilla (NMU) (United States) Taboretaka (LVL)
**29**	(United States) Cochran (FRS)	(Colombia) Rebellón (ELP) (United States) Orozco (OCO) (United States) Davis (NSH)	(Lesotho) Matsoso (LOU) (United States) Hernández (SPR) (Colombia) Asprilla (POR) (Canada) Johnson (TBR)	(Brazil) Kléber (AUS) (Guinea) Barry (OTT) (United States) **Chavez** (FRS)	(United States) Bird (RGV) (Cuba) Chang (SLC) (Brazil) Fernando (ATL) (United States) Hertzog (RNO) (Ghana) Kasim (BRM) (United States) Lindley (MEM) (United States) Morton (PIT)
**30**	(United States) Morton (PIT)	(United States) Perez (NCA) (Trinidad and Tobago) Powder (SLC) (Colombia) Rebellón (ELP)	(Colombia) Restrepo (SAN) (Jamaica) **Forbes** (PIT) (Uruguay) Martinez (CLT) (United States) Calistri (PHX) (Honduras) Altamirano (TUL)	(Germany) Wild (LDN) (United States) Parra (LVL)	(Jamaica) Brett (PIT) (Belgium) Corti (RGV) (Canada) Johnson (TBR) (United States) Lindley (MEM) (Mexico) Ríos (NSH) (United States) Rodriguez (RGV) (United States) Zubak (LAG)
**31**	(United States) **Marcinkowski** (RNO)	(England) Obasi (OTT) (Belgium) N’Toko (ELP) (The Gambia) Mansally (CLT)	(England) Forrester (OCO) (Germany) Wild (LDN) (Spain) Aguinaga (PHX) (United States) Parra (LVL)	(Denmark) Enevoldsen (SAC) (United States) Spencer (PHX) (United States) Dhillon (TAC)	(United States) Campbell (ATL) (Bosnia and Herzegovina) Kristo (NCA) (United States) Ocampo-Chavez (TAC) (Canada) Ouimette (IND) (Denmark) Rasmussen (LOU) (United States) Rawls (COL) (Colombia) Velásquez (ELP)
**32**	(United States) Putna (SLC)	(United States) Lasso (NSH) (England) Obasi (OTT) (United States) Campbell (ATL)	(Denmark) Rasmussen (LOU) (Colombia) Bedoya (HAR) (Lesotho) Matsoso (LOU) (South Africa) Moloto (NSH) (Colombia) Restrepo (SAN)	(Mexico) **Guzmán** (SAN) (Senegal) Ndour (LDN)	(Cuba) Chang (SLC) (United States) Cropper (HAR) (England) Hilton (STL) (United States) Iwasa (SAC) (United States) Jackson (CLT) (Republic of Ireland) McCabe (LOU) (United States) Partida (RNO)
**33**	(United States) Muse (TAC)	(United States) Ryden (SLC) (United States) Greenspan (PIT) (United States) Lacroix (RNO)	(Nigeria) Akinyode (NSH) (Mexico) Gómez (ELP) (Bermuda) **Lewis** (CHS) (Uruguay) Martinez (CLT) (Netherlands) Koreniuk (LAG)	(United States) Murphy (LDN) (United States) Jahn (PHX)	(South Africa) Bosua (CHS) (England) Forrester (OCO) (Trinidad and Tobago) Fortune (NCA) (United States) Hertzog (RNO) (Republic of Ireland) McCabe (LOU) (United States) Vom Steeg (LAG) (England) Williams (HAR)
**Bold** denotes Player of the Week
