= Jose Villarreal (soccer) =

American soccer player

Personal information
- Full name: Jose Villarreal
- Date of birth: September 10, 1993 (age 33)
- Place of birth: Inglewood, California, United States
- Height: 1.73 m (5 ft 8 in)
- Position: Winger

Youth career
- 2007–2009: South Bay Force
- 2009–2011: Pateadores
- 2011–2012: LA Galaxy

Senior career*
Years	Team	Apps	(Gls)
2012–2017	LA Galaxy	68	(5)
2014	→ Cruz Azul (loan)	0	(0)
2014–2017	→ LA Galaxy II	33	(7)
2018	Orlando City	3	(0)
2019	Las Vegas Lights	16	(1)
2020	Global		
2022	Los Angeles Force	3	(0)
2022	Central Valley Fuego	11	(0)

International career
2011	United States U18	3	(0)
2011–2013	United States U20	11	(8)
2011–2015	United States U23	2	(0)
Medal record
Representing United States
Runner-up	CONCACAF U-20 Championship	2013
- * Club domestic league appearances and goals as of October 16, 2022

Jose Villarreal (born September 10, 1993) is an American soccer player who plays as a forward. He has previously played for LA Galaxy and Orlando City in MLS, Cruz Azul in Liga MX and Las Vegas Lights in the USL Championship.

== Club career ==
=== Youth career ===
Villarreal won the U.S. Soccer Development Academy U-17/18 championship with Pateadores during the 2010–2011 Development Academy season. Pateadores won the championship after defeating FC Dallas 2–1 with Villarreal scoring both goals.

=== LA Galaxy ===
On December 22, 2011, Villarreal signed with LA Galaxy as a Homegrown Player. Aged 17, he made his debut for LA Galaxy on July 15, 2012, against Portland Timbers, coming on in the 90th minute, replacing Robbie Keane. Villarreal scored for LA Galaxy on July 18, with a late long-range goal, to tie the game at 2–2 in only his second MLS match.

On March 30, 2013, Villarreal scored a stoppage-time goal against Toronto FC to earn a 2–2 draw for LA Galaxy. Villarreal's goal was named the No. 1 play of the day on SportsCenter.

On December 20, 2013, Villarreal moved to Mexican club Cruz Azul on loan from the LA Galaxy for a year with an option to buy after the loan for the Mexican side. However, Villarreal never made a first team roster for Cruz Azul and he terminated his loan early following the collapse of Cruz Azul Hidalgo, the club's reserve team that competed in Ascenso MX with whom he played once.

On March 6, 2015, he scored the first goal of the MLS season in a 2–0 home win over the Chicago Fire.

On July 1, 2015, Villarreal scored the winner in the opening 10 minutes in the Fifth Round of the U.S. Open Cup against San Jose Earthquakes.

=== Orlando City ===
On December 27, 2017, Villarreal was traded by LA Galaxy to Orlando City SC in exchange for a third-round selection in the 2019 MLS SuperDraft. Villarreal made his Orlando City debut on June 2, 2018, against New York City FC. On November 27, 2018, Villarreal had his contract option declined by the club having only made 3 substitute appearances for the Lions in MLS.

=== Las Vegas Lights ===
On May 29, 2019, Villarreal signed for the Las Vegas Lights FC for the remainder of the 2019 USL Championship season. He made his Lights FC debut in the 69th minute of a U.S. Open Cup match against Orange County FC.

=== Global F.C. ===
In January 2020, Villarreal signed for Philippines Football League club Global F.C.

=== Los Angeles Force ===
In 2022, Villarreal played for NISA club Los Angeles Force, making three appearances.

=== Central Valley Fuego ===
On June 30, 2022, Villarreal signed with USL League One side Central Valley Fuego.

== International career ==
Villarreal has been capped for the United States at under-18, under-20 and under-23 level.

He competed at the 2013 CONCACAF U-20 Championship where he scored 3 goals and was named to the All-Tournament Team. The team lost the final 3–1 after extra time to hosts and defending champions Mexico. He then represented the United States at the 2013 FIFA U-20 World Cup.

== Personal life ==
Villarreal was born in Inglewood, California to immigrant Mexican parents. His younger brother Jaime (born 1995) is also a professional soccer player.

== Career statistics ==
=== Club ===
As of September 29, 2019

Club	Season	League			Playoffs		US Open Cup		Continental		Total	
Club	Season	Division	Apps	Goals	Apps	Goals	Apps	Goals	Apps	Goals	Apps	Goals
LA Galaxy	2012	MLS	10	1	1	0	0	0	3	1	14	2
LA Galaxy	2013	MLS	22	2	1	0	1	1	7	1	31	4
LA Galaxy	2014	MLS	5	0	0	0	0	0	0	0	5	0
LA Galaxy	2015	MLS	16	2	0	0	2	1	2	0	20	3
LA Galaxy	2016	MLS	3	0	0	0	1	1	0	0	4	1
LA Galaxy	2017	MLS	12	0	0	0	2	1	–		14	1
LA Galaxy	Total		68	5	2	0	6	4	12	2	88	11
LA Galaxy II (loan)	2015	USL	3	0	–		–		–		3	0
LA Galaxy II (loan)	2016	USL	24	7	1	0	–		–		25	7
LA Galaxy II (loan)	2017	USL	6	0	–		–		–		6	0
LA Galaxy II (loan)	Total		33	7	1	0	–		–		34	7
Orlando City	2018	MLS	3	0	–		2	0	–		5	0
Las Vegas Lights	2019	USL Championship	15	1	0	0	1	0	–		16	1
Career Total			119	13	3	0	9	4	12	2	143	19

== Honors ==
LA Galaxy

- MLS Cup: 2012, 2014
