= Zac Lubin =

American soccer player

Personal information
- Full name: Zachary Lubin
- Date of birth: August 19, 1989 (age 37)
- Place of birth: Bozeman, Montana, United States
- Height: 1.96 m (6 ft 5 in)
- Position: Goalkeeper

College career
| Years | Team | Apps | (Gls) |
| 2007–2010 | Saint Martin's Saints | | |

Senior career*
| Years | Team | Apps | (Gls) |
| 2011–2012 | Kitsap Pumas | 18 | (0) |
| 2013 | Seattle Sounders FC U-23 | 9 | (0) |
| 2014 | IFK Luleå | 20 | (0) |
| 2015 | Tulsa Roughnecks | 15 | (0) |
| 2016 | Swope Park Rangers | 10 | (0) |
| 2017 | Ljungskile SK | 18 | (0) |
| 2018–2021 | Phoenix Rising | 47 | (0) |
| 2018 | → Seattle Sounders FC (loan) | 0 | (0) |
| 2022 | Northern Colorado Hailstorm | 0 | (0) |

Managerial career
- 2022: Northern Colorado Hailstorm (goalkeeping)
- * Club domestic league appearances and goals

Zac Lubin (born August 19, 1989) is an American former professional soccer player.

== Career ==
=== College and amateur ===
Lubin spent his entire college career at Saint Martin's University. He made a total of 67 appearances for the Saints and finished with a 2.17 Goals Against Average.

He also played in the Premier Development League for Kitsap Pumas and Seattle Sounders FC U-23.

=== Professional ===
In 2014, Lubin joined Swedish club IFK Luleå where he made 20 appearances. On March 20, he signed with USL club Tulsa Roughnecks FC. He made his debut for the club a week later in a 1–1 draw against Oklahoma City Energy FC.

Lubin signed with Swope Park Rangers on December 16, 2015.

On February 6, 2018, Lubin signed with the Phoenix Rising FC of the United Soccer League.

On June 30, 2018, Lubin was loaned to the Seattle Sounders FC of the MLS for their match against the Portland Timbers. Two of Seattle's three goalkeepers were injured, therefore prompting the emergency loan of Lubin.

=== Coaching ===
On July 21, 2022, Lubin joined Éamon Zayed's staff at USL League One's Northern Colorado Hailstorm FC as the goalkeeping coach.

== Honors ==
=== Individual ===
- USL Championship All-League Second Team: 2019
