= Edwin Rivas =

American soccer player (born 1992)

Personal information
- Full name: Edwin Orlando Rivas Tambito
- Date of birth: January 8, 1992 (age 34)
- Place of birth: Los Angeles, California, United States
- Height: 1.80 m (5 ft 11 in)
- Positions: Forward; full-back

Team information
- Current team: Los Angeles Force
- Number: 92

Youth career
- 2008–2010: Real So Cal

College career
Years	Team	Apps	(Gls)
2010–2014	Cal State Northridge Matadors		

Senior career*
Years	Team	Apps	(Gls)
2013	Ventura County Fusion	7	(0)
2014	Los Angeles Misioneros	5	(0)
2015	Toronto FC II	18	(1)
2017	L.A. Wolves		
2018	California United FC II		
2019	Las Vegas Lights	18	(1)
2020–2021	Xelajú	17	(1)
2021	Municipal	6	(0)
2021	Santa Lucía	6	(0)
2022–	Los Angeles Force	35	(6)
- * Club domestic league appearances and goals as of January 9, 2024

Edwin Rivas (born January 8, 1992) is a Guatemalan-American soccer player who currently plays for Los Angeles Force in the National Independent Soccer Association.

== Career ==
=== College and amateur ===
Rivas spent his entire college career at California State University, Northridge. He made a total of 78 appearances for the Matadors and tallied 17 goals and 10 assists.

He also played in the Premier Development League for Ventura County Fusion and Los Angeles Misioneros.

=== Professional ===
On January 15, 2015, Rivas was selected in the second round (37th overall) of the 2015 MLS SuperDraft by Toronto FC. Two months later, he signed a professional contract with USL affiliate club Toronto FC II. He made his professional debut on April 19 in a 1–1 draw against Whitecaps FC 2. Rivas was let go at the end of the 2015 season as his contract was not renewed .

Rivas joined USL Championship side Las Vegas Lights on January 9, 2019.
