= Joe Kuzminsky =

American soccer player

Personal information
- Date of birth: January 26, 1994 (age 32)
- Place of birth: Denver, Colorado, United States
- Height: 6 ft 4 in (1.93 m)
- Position: Goalkeeper

Youth career
- Colorado Rapids

College career
Years	Team	Apps	(Gls)
2012–2016	UAB Blazers	50	(0)

Senior career*
Years	Team	Apps	(Gls)
2014	Real Colorado Foxes	0	(0)
2017–2022	Charleston Battery	99	(1)
2020	→ Maccabi Haifa (loan)	0	(0)
2023	Colorado Springs Switchbacks	8	(0)
- * Club domestic league appearances and goals as of October 16, 2023

Joe Kuzminsky (born January 26, 1994) is an American former professional soccer player who played as a goalkeeper.

== Career ==
Kuzminsky played five years of college soccer at the University of Alabama at Birmingham between 2012 and 2016, including a red-shirted year in 2012.

Kuzminsky also played with USL PDL side Real Colorado Foxes in 2014.

Kuzminsky signed with USL Championship club Charleston Battery on March 21, 2017.

In January 2020, Kuzminsky was sent on a season-long loan to Maccabi Haifa of the Israeli Premier League.

Kuzminsky entered the 2022 season as the longest-tenured player on the Battery, his sixth year with the team. He played his 100th overall game for the club on April 23, 2022, against Louisville City FC, a 1–1 draw at home. Kuzminsky also scored the fire goal of his career during the 2022 season, finding the back of the net in stoppage time against Loudoun United FC in a successful last-ditch effort to earn a 1–1 draw at the death. Following the 2022 season, Kuzminsky was released by Charleston.

On December 9, 2022, it was announced that Kuzminsky would join USL Championship side Colorado Springs Switchbacks for their 2023 season.
