= Miguel Palafox =

American soccer player (born 1994)

Personal information
- Full name: Miguel Agustín Palafox Prudencio
- Date of birth: December 29, 1994 (age 31)
- Place of birth: Los Angeles, California, United States
- Height: 6 ft 1 in (1.85 m)
- Position: Defender

Youth career
- 2013–2014: Alianza De Fútbol Hispano

Senior career*
Years	Team	Apps	(Gls)
2014–2015	León	1	(0)
2015	Santa Tecla	4	(0)
2016	New York Cosmos B	6	(2)
2018	Estudiantes Tecos	0	(0)
2019	Las Vegas Lights	2	(0)
- * Club domestic league appearances and goals as of May 8, 2019

Miguel Agustín Palafox Prudencio (born December 29, 1994) is an American soccer player.

== Early life ==
Palafox was born in Los Angeles, California. He is an American of Mexican and Salvadoran descent.

== Career ==
=== Club Leon ===
After a high school career at Taft in Los Angeles, Palafox trialed with several Liga MX clubs via Alianza de Futbol Hispano, an organization that gears to develop Hispanic soccer at the amateur level. Through Alianza de Futbol Hispano, Palafox was able to secure a contract with Club León of Liga MX in April 2014.

Palafox made his professional league debut with León on April 12, 2014, as a starter against Toluca. León won both the Apertura and Clausura in the 2013–14 Liga MX season.

=== Santa Tecla ===
On June 20, 2015, it was announced that Palafox signed to Santa Tecla of the Salvadoran Primera División.

=== New York Cosmos B ===
On May 6, 2016, it was announced that Palafox signed to New York Cosmos B of the National Premier Soccer League.

=== Las Vegas Lights ===
After attending an open tryout, Palafox joined USL Championship side Las Vegas Lights ahead of their 2019 season.
