= Tabort Etaka Preston =

Cameroonian footballer (born 1998)

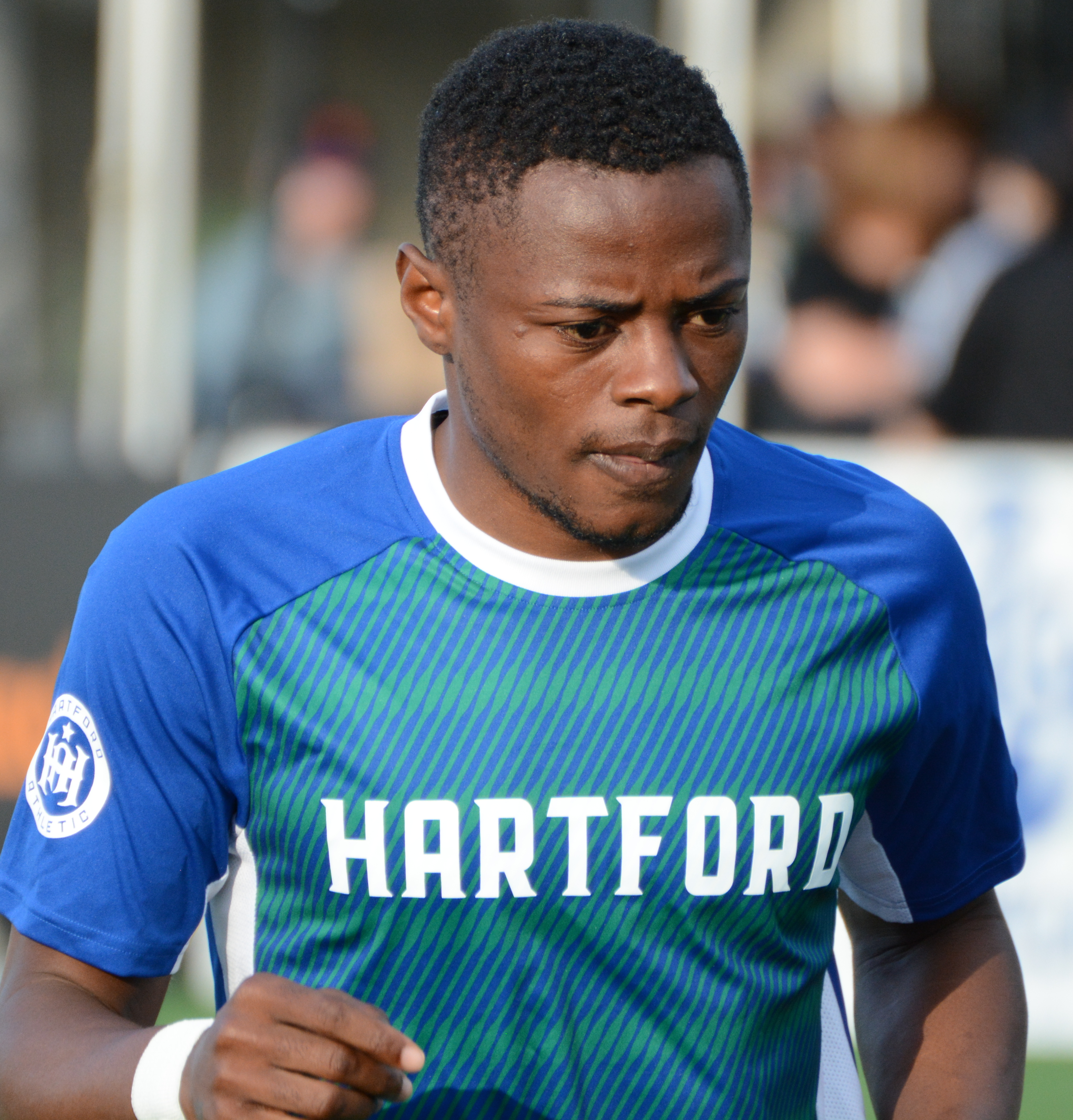
- Preston with Hartford Athletic in 2021

Personal information
- Date of birth: 10 June 1998 (age 28)
- Place of birth: Bamenda, Cameroon
- Height: 1.76 m (5 ft 9 in)
- Position: Forward

Team information
- Current team: Detroit City
- Number: 18

Senior career*
Years	Team	Apps	(Gls)
- Rainbow FC
2017	Charlotte Independence	0	(0)
2018	KS Kastrioti	3	(0)
2019	MFK Vyškov	0	(0)
2019	→ Las Vegas Lights (loan)	31	(8)
2020	San Antonio FC	2	(0)
2021	Hartford Athletic	26	(5)
2022	New Mexico United	26	(3)
2023	Las Vegas Lights	21	(5)
2023–2025	Birmingham Legion	72	(5)
2026–	Detroit City	9	(0)

International career^{‡}
2017	Cameroon U20	2	(0)
- * Club domestic league appearances and goals as of 16:32, 4 November 2026 (UTC) ‡ National team caps and goals as of 21:01, 3 January 2019 (UTC)

Tabort Etaka Preston (sometimes referred to as Preston Tabortetaka) (born 10 June 1998) is a Cameroonian football player who plays as a forwardfor Detroit City FC in the USL Championship.

== Club career ==
=== Rainbow FC ===
Preston began his career in his native Cameroon playing for Rainbow FC.

=== Charlotte Independence ===
He was transferred to Charlotte Independence of the USL Championship in January 2018, but did not make an official appearance for the team before being moved to Albanian club KS Kastrioti.

=== KS Kastiroti ===
In 2018, Preston made three appearances with Albanian club KS Kastrioti.

=== MFK Vyskov ===
In 2019, he moved to Czech club MFK Vyskov.

=== Las Vegas Lights ===
For the 2019 season, Preston played for Las Vegas Lights. In 31 league appearances with Las Vegas, Preston scored eight goals and recorded three assists in 2,249 minutes played.

=== San Antonio FC ===
Preston signed with San Antonio FC for the 2020 USL season, but after two appearances he and club mutually agreed to part ways.

=== Hartford Athletic ===
Preston signed with Hartford Athletic for the 2021 season.

=== New Mexico United ===
Preston signed a contract for the 2022 season with USL Championship side New Mexico United on 29 December 2021.

=== Return to Las Vegas ===
In February 2023, it was announced that Preston had re-joined former side Las Vegas Lights for their 2023 season.

=== Detroit City FC ===
On 23 February 2026, Detroit City FC announced they had signed Preston to a contract for the 2026 season.

== International career ==
Preston has represented Cameroon at the U-20 level where he made three appearances at the African U-20 Cup of Nations in 2017.
