= Erik Holt =

American soccer player

Personal information
- Full name: Erik Lee Holt
- Date of birth: September 6, 1996 (age 30)
- Place of birth: San Diego, California, United States
- Height: 6 ft 1 in (1.85 m)
- Position: Defender

Youth career
- 2015: Real Salt Lake AZ

College career
Years	Team	Apps	(Gls)
2015–2018	UCLA Bruins	71	(1)

Senior career*
Years	Team	Apps	(Gls)
2016	San Diego Zest	8	(2)
2017–2018	FC Golden State Force	1	(0)
2019–2024	Real Salt Lake	42	(1)
2019–2024	Real Monarchs	43	(4)

International career
2010	United States U14		
- * Club domestic league appearances and goals as of November 30, 2024

Erik Lee Holt (born September 6, 1996) is an American soccer player who most recently played as a defender for Real Salt Lake in Major League Soccer.

== Career ==
=== College and amateur ===
Holt played four years of college soccer at the University of California, Los Angeles between 2015 and 2018, scoring 1 goal and tallying 5 assists in 71 appearances.

Holt also played with USL Premier Development League sides San Diego Zest and FC Golden State Force.

=== Professional ===
On January 3, 2019, Holt signed as a Homegrown Player for Real Salt Lake of Major League Soccer. Holt made his MLS debut on March 23, 2019, for Real Salt Lake against Los Angeles FC.

He scored his first MLS goal on June 18, 2021, against Vancouver Whitecaps FC.

== Honors ==
Real Monarchs

- USL Cup 2019
