= Thomas Olsen (soccer) =

American soccer player

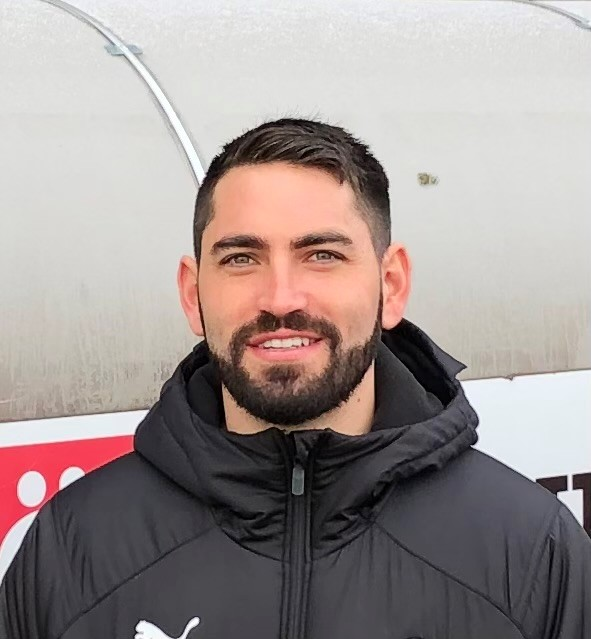
- Thomas K Olsen at FFJaro 2021

Personal information
- Full name: Thomas Knute Olsen
- Date of birth: February 14, 1995 (age 31)
- Place of birth: Las Vegas, Nevada, United States
- Height: 6 ft 3 in (1.91 m)
- Position: Goalkeeper

Youth career
- Las Vegas Premier
- –2013: Bishop Gorman Gaels
- –2013: Las Vegas Soccer Academy

College career
Years	Team	Apps	(Gls)
2014–2017	San Diego Toreros	71	(0)

Senior career*
Years	Team	Apps	(Gls)
2015–2016	FC Tucson	11	(0)
2018–2020	Las Vegas Lights	41	(0)
2018	→ Sacramento Republic (loan)	0	(0)
2021	FF Jaro	17	(0)
2022	Northern Colorado Hailstorm	13	(0)

International career
2015	United States U20	1	(0)
- * Club domestic league appearances and goals as of October 9, 2022

Thomas Olsen (born February 14, 1995) is an American former professional soccer player.

== Career ==
=== Youth ===
Born and raised in Las Vegas, Nevada, Olsen came from a large soccer family and began playing at age four. He switched from striker to defender, and became a goalkeeper by age nine, traveling first with Las Vegas Premier SC and later Las Vegas Sports Academy (LVSA), and winning a number of tournaments and state club titles.

A starter throughout his high school and club career, Olsen completed the double in his senior year of high school by winning both the state high school (Bishop Gorman) championship and state club championship (LVSA) crowns in 2013.

=== College ===
Olsen passed on other options and elected to play his college soccer the University of San Diego where he became the starting keeper in 2014, after redshirting the 2013 season, and remained the starter for four years, between 2014 and 2017. During that time he appeared in 71 season games (70 starts), logging 203 saves (3rd all time), and 18 shutouts. He was WCC Freshman Player of the Year in 2014, two-time WCC Player of the Week, and was selected for All-Conference honors in 2014, 2015, and 2017.

While at college, Olsen also appeared in successive summers for USL PDL side FC Tucson, first after returning from the U-20 World Cup in 2015. and again in 2016. With Olsen in goal, FC Tucson advanced to the Western Conference Championship in 2015 and 2016.

=== Professional ===
On January 21, 2018, Olsen was selected in the third round (50th overall) of the 2018 MLS SuperDraft by Colorado Rapids. However, he was released by the club just prior to the regular season.

After a very brief 1-0 stint with ASC San Diego, on May 4, 2018, Olsen joined USL side Las Vegas Lights in its inaugural season. On August 3, 2018, Olsen was sent on a short-term loan to USL side Sacramento Republic.

Olsen then returned to the Lights and made his professional debut on September 29, 2018, starting against OKC Energy, and he also started the remaining three games of the season. In those four games Olsen chalked up 18 saves, including seven against conference leading Phoenix and six against his former club, Sacramento.

In 2019, Olsen continued as the starting goalkeeper for the Lights, appearing in all 31 matches. Dubbed “The Mayor of Cashman [Field]” by the local press, he accumulated nine clean sheets and 93 saves during the season, as well as one assist and two penalty saves. Olsen was named by the USL Championship as the Las Vegas Lights Mid-Season MVP, and nominated on multiple occasions for USL Championship Save of the Week.

For the COVID-truncated 2020 season, the Lights found themselves starting late in group play, which forced the team during one stretch to play eight games in a 24-day period and required frequent personnel changes. Olsen appeared in six games, notching 19 saves and one PK save, and garnering a USL Man of the Match honor.

On April 20, 2021, Olsen signed with Finnish Ykkönen side FF Jaro. Despite being sidelined for 10 games due to an on field collision, Olsen made a successful return to shepherd FF Jaro through the playoffs and notched 7 clean sheets in just 17 games, including a 1–0 victory of over league winners VPS in the final game of the season.

Olsen signed with USL League One expansion club Northern Colorado Hailstorm on January 20, 2022. Following the 2022 season, Northern Colorado declined his contract option.

=== International career ===
In the spring of 2015, Olsen was selected for training in England with the U.S. Under-20 side and for the U-20 International Friendlies. He made one appearance against the Tottenham Hotspurs under-21's. Then Olsen was named to the U.S. Under-20 side for the 2015 FIFA U-20 World Cup in New Zealand, as a backup to Zack Steffen.

== Personal life ==
Olsen comes from a large extended family, including two sisters and one brother, and 32 first cousins. These include four cousins who played Division 1 college soccer and one, Mike Zaher, who played professionally.
