= Christian Torres (footballer, born 1996) =

Mexican footballer

Personal information
- Full name: Christian David Torres Roldán
- Date of birth: October 23, 1996 (age 30)
- Place of birth: Tulancingo, Hidalgo, Mexico
- Height: 1.81 m (5 ft 11 in)
- Position: Defender

Youth career
- 2012–2016: Tijuana

Senior career*
Years	Team	Apps	(Gls)
2016–2017	Dorados de Sinaloa	13	(0)
2018–2019	Las Vegas Lights	52	(2)
- * Club domestic league appearances and goals as of October 25, 2019

Christian David Torres Roldán (born October 23, 1996, in Tulancingo, Hidalgo) is a Mexican professional footballer. He made his professional debut with Tijuana during a Copa MX victory over Necaxa on 21 January 2015.
