= Irvin Parra =

American soccer player

Personal information
- Full name: Irvin Raúl Parra
- Date of birth: August 18, 1993 (age 33)
- Place of birth: Inglewood, California, United States
- Height: 6 ft 1 in (1.85 m)
- Position: Forward

Youth career
- 2010–2011: Pateadores

Senior career*
Years	Team	Apps	(Gls)
2012	FC 08 Homburg	3	(0)
2012–2014	SVN Zweibrücken	30	(22)
2014–2016	1. FC Kaiserslautern II	27	(23)
2016–2017	Seattle Sounders FC 2	26	(10)
2017	Orange County SC	16	(12)
2018	Cal FC	0	(0)
2019	Las Vegas Lights	31	(18)
2020	San Diego Loyal	5	(3)
2021	Charlotte Independence	31	(13)
2022–2024	Northern Colorado Hailstorm	44	(12)
- * Club domestic league appearances and goals as of November 21, 2024

Irvin Raúl Parra (born August 18, 1993) is an American professional soccer player who currently plays as a forward.

== Career ==
=== FC 08 Homburg ===
Parra signed his first professional contract with FC 08 Homburg and played in their 2011–12 season. During Parra's time with Homburg he appeared in three matches. On August 31, 2012, it was reported that Parra was banned for disciplinary reasons from the team.

=== SVN Zweibrücken ===
With SVN Zweibrücken, Parra made 30 appearances with twenty-two goals in his one season with the team.

=== 1. FC Kaiserslautern II ===
On May 29, 2014, it was announced that Parra had signed with Kaiserslautern II. On June 29, 2016, reports came out that Parra was no longer training with the team and on July 1 Parra was considered a free agent. Over his two seasons with Kaiserslautern II, Parra appeared in 27 matches and scored twenty-three goals.

=== Seattle Sounders FC 2 ===
Parra signed with the Seattle Sounders FC 2 on August 4, midway through the 2016 season, after becoming a free agent at the conclusion of 1. FC Kaiserslautern II's 2015–2016 season. On August 20, Parra appeared in his first match which resulted in a 1–0 defeat against San Antonio FC. On September 2, Parra scored his first goal in a 2–1 victory against Vancouver Whitecaps FC 2.

=== Las Vegas Lights ===
On January 9, 2019, Parra signed for USL Championship side Las Vegas Lights.

=== San Diego Loyal ===
On December 20, 2019, it was announced that Parra would join San Diego Loyal SC ahead of their inaugural USL Championship season in 2020.

=== Charlotte Independence ===
On April 19, 2021, Parra joined Charlotte Independence ahead of the 2021 USL Championship season.

=== Northern Colorado Hailstorm ===
On January 13, 2022, Parra joined USL League One expansion side Northern Colorado Hailstorm FC.
