= Gabe Robinson =

American soccer player (born 1995)

Personal information
- Date of birth: February 5, 1995 (age 31)
- Place of birth: Valencia, California, United States
- Height: 1.88 m (6 ft 2 in)
- Position: Defender

Team information
- Current team: Albion San Diego

Youth career
- –2012: Hart Indians

College career
Years	Team	Apps	(Gls)
2013–2016	Cal State Northridge Matadors	62	(3)

Senior career*
Years	Team	Apps	(Gls)
2017	L.A. Wolves		
2019–2021	Las Vegas Lights	35	(3)
2020	→ Colorado Springs Switchbacks (loan)	3	(0)
2021	Municipal	0	(0)
2021–2022	Grindavík	6	(1)
2022	Los Angeles Force	0	(0)
2023–	Albion San Diego	2	(0)
- * Club domestic league appearances and goals as of January 10, 2024

Gabriel Robinson (born February 5, 1995) is an American soccer player who plays as a defender for Albion San Diego.
