= 2023 El Paso Locomotive FC season =

El Paso Locomotive FC
2023 season
- Head coach: Brian Clarhaut
- Stadium: Southwest University Park, El Paso, TX
- USL: Western Conference: 7th
- USL Cup Playoffs: First Round
- 2023 U.S. Open Cup: 2nd Round
- Copa Tejas Division II: 3rd
- Copa Tejas Shield: 3rd
- Top goalscorer: Luis Solignac (9)
- Highest home attendance: 8,411
- Lowest home attendance: 5,014
- Average home league attendance: 6,711
- Biggest win: LOU 0–3 ELP (3/25) (USLC)
- Biggest defeat: PHX 5–0 ELP (8/12) (USLC); OMA 2–0 ELP (4/5) (USOC)
Away colors
- All statistics correct as of 16:57, October 16, 2023 (UTC).

The 2023 El Paso Locomotive FC season was the fifth season for El Paso Locomotive FC in the USL Championship, the second tier of professional soccer in the United States and Canada.

== Staff ==
Position	Name
Head coach	(United States) Brian Clarhaut
Assistant coach	(United States) Marina Schachowskoj
Assistant coach	(United States) Gianluca Masucci
Assistant coach	(United States) Jon Burklo
Goalkeeping coach	(Colombia) Juan Carlos "JC" Garzon
Coordinator, equipment and player operations	(United States) Saul Soto

== Roster ==
As of September 5, 2023

No.	Pos.	Player	Nation
1	GK	USA	Benny Díaz (on loan from Tijuana)
2	DF	ESP	Marc Navarro
4	DF	SWE	Erik McCue
5	DF	MEX	Éder Borelli
6	MF	SLV	Eric Calvillo
7	FW	MEX	Aarón Gómez
8	MF	USA	Luis Moreno
9	FW	ARG	Luis Solignac
10	FW	UKR	Denys Kostyshyn
11	MF	USA	Christopher Garcia
13	GK	USA	Javier Garcia
14	DF	USA	Ander Egiluz
15	GK	USA	Noah Dollenmayer
16	DF	USA	Miles Lyons
17	FW	USA	Ricardo Zacarías
19	MF	USA	Arun Basuljevic
20	MF	USA	Chapa Herrera
21	FW	ENG	Emmanuel Sonupe
22	MF	AUS	Liam Rose
23	DF	ESP	José Carrillo
24	DF	ESP	Yuma
27	MF	SWE	Petar Petrović
31	DF	USA	Nick Hinds
46	DF	HUN	Márton Demkó
57	DF	USA	Joseluis Villagomez
72	DF	USA	Finnley O'Brien
77	MF	USA	Diego Abarca
79	GK	USA	Rommel Tarin
80	MF	USA	Alejandro Estrada
88	MF	USA	Joel Maldonado
99	GK	USA	Santiago Vargas
—	DF	FRO	Petur Knudsen

== Transfers ==
=== In ===
Date	No.	Pos.	Player	From	Fee	Source
October 28, 2022	77	MF	(United States) Diego Abarca	(United States) El Paso Locomotive Academy	Free	
October 28, 2022	88	MF	(United States) Joel Maldonado	(United States) El Paso Locomotive Academy	Free	
November 3, 2022	2	DF	(Spain) Marc Navarro	Free agent	Free	
November 9, 2022	4	DF	(United States) Erik McCue	(Faroe Islands) AB Argir	Undisclosed	
December 5, 2022	10	MF	(Ukraine) Denys Kostyshyn	(Ukraine) FC Oleksandriya	Free	
January 5, 2023	11	FW	(United States) Christopher Garcia	(United States) Real Salt Lake	Free	
January 6, 2023	13	GK	(United States) Javier Garcia	(United States) Rio Grande Valley FC Toros	Free	
January 11, 2023	27	MF	(Sweden) Petar Petrović	(Sweden) Trelleborg	Free	
January 27, 2023	3	DF	(Hungary) Bence Pávkovics	(Hungary) Debreceni	Free	
February 27, 2023	8	MF	(United States) Luis Moreno	(United States) Houston Dynamo Academy	Free	
June 26, 2023	23	DF	(Spain) José Carrillo	(Republic of Ireland) Finn Harps F.C.	Free	
August 18, 2023		FW	(Faroe Islands) Petur Knudsen	(Denmark) Lyngby Boldklub	Free	
August 31, 2023	19	MF	(United States) Arun Basuljevic	Free agent	Free	

=== Loans in ===
No.	Pos.	Player	Loaned from	Start	End	Source
1	GK	(United States) Benny Díaz	(Mexico) Club Tijuana	January 18, 2023	November 30, 2023	
15	DF	(United States) Noah Dollenmayer	(United States) LAFC 2	August 24, 2023	November 30, 2023	

=== USL Academy players ===
No.	Pos.	Player
46	DF	Márton Demkó
57	DF	Joseluis Villagomez
72	DF	Finnley O'Brien
79	GK	Rommel Tarin
80	MF	Alejandro Estrada
99	GK	Santiago Vargas

=== Out ===
Date	No.	Pos.	Player	To	Fee	Source
October 10, 2022	13	DF	(United States) Matt Bahner	Retirement	N/A	
October 14, 2022	6	MF	(Republic of Ireland) Richie Ryan	Retirement	N/A	
October 18, 2022	12	MF	(Grenada) Shavon John-Brown	Free agent	Free	
October 18, 2022	23	MF	(Haiti) Christiano François	(United States) Rio Grande Valley FC Toros	Free	
October 18, 2022	27	GK	(Germany) Philipp Beigl	Free agent	Free	
October 19, 2022	4	DF	(England) Andrew Fox	(United States) Orange County SC	Free	
October 20, 2022	10	MF	(United States) Dylan Mares	(United States) Louisville City FC	Free	
January 19, 2023	33	MF	(Colombia) Martín Payares	Mutual Agreement	Free	
July 3, 2023	19	MF	(Ukraine) Artem Kholod	Mutual Agreement	Free	
August 9, 2023	23	DF	(Hungary) Bence Pávkovics	(Hungary) Vasas SC	Undisclosed	

== Non-competitive fixtures ==
=== Preseason ===
January 28, 2023	El Paso Locomotive FC	v	El Paso Locomotive FC U-20	El Paso, TX
		Report		Stadium: Southwest University Park

February 4, 2023	Austin FC	5–0	El Paso Locomotive FC	Austin, TX
	Driussi 15'; Wolff 33'; Rodríguez 70'; Finlay 72'; Urruti 110'	Report		Stadium: St. David's Performance Center
Note: Played as two 45-minute halves and a 30-minute extra period

February 11, 2023	El Paso Locomotive FC	5–0	Barcelona Residency Academy	El Paso, TX
	Gómez, Petrović, trailist	Report		Stadium: Southwest University Park

February 14, 2023	Real Salt Lake	5-0	El Paso Locomotive FC	Tucson, Arizona
		Report		Stadium: Kino Sports Complex

February 19, 2023	New Mexico United	3–1	El Paso Locomotive FC	Albuquerque, New Mexico
4:00 pm CT	Waggoner 9'; Bruce 33', 41'	Report	Sonupe 4'; Yuma (red card) 24'	Stadium: Isotopes Park

February 25, 2023	El Paso Locomotive FC	2–0	San Antonio FC	El Paso, TX
	Gómez 84', 86'	Report		Stadium: Southwest University Park

March 4, 2023	El Paso Locomotive FC	v	UDA Soccer	El Paso, TX
				Stadium: Southwest University Park

== Competitive fixtures ==
=== USL Championship ===
==== Standings — Western Conference ====
Pos	Team	Pld	W	L	T	GF	GA	GD	Pts	Qualification
1	Sacramento Republic FC	34	18	6	10	51	26	+25	64	Playoffs
2	Orange County SC	34	17	11	6	46	39	+7	57	Playoffs
3	San Diego Loyal SC	34	16	9	9	61	43	+18	57	Playoffs
4	San Antonio FC	34	14	6	14	63	38	+25	56	Playoffs
5	Colorado Springs Switchbacks FC	34	16	13	5	49	42	+7	53	Playoffs
6	Phoenix Rising FC (C)	34	12	10	12	54	41	+13	48	Playoffs
7	El Paso Locomotive FC	34	13	13	8	41	51	−10	47	Playoffs
8	New Mexico United	34	13	14	7	51	49	+2	46	Playoffs
9	Rio Grande Valley FC Toros	34	10	11	13	43	48	−5	43	
10	Oakland Roots SC	34	11	14	9	45	48	−3	42	
11	Monterey Bay FC	34	11	15	8	42	53	−11	41	
12	Las Vegas Lights FC	34	3	21	10	36	66	−30	19	

Source: USL Championship Standings
Rules for classification: 1) head-to-head points; 2) head-to-head goal differential; 3) points-per game within conference; 4) total wins; 5) total goal differential; 6) total goals scored; 7) points earned against top four Conference finishers; 8) disciplinary points; 9) coin toss or drawing of lots
(C) Champions

==== Match results ====
March 11, 2023 1	El Paso Locomotive FC	0–1	Sacramento Republic FC	El Paso, Texas
8:30 pm MST	Yuma (yellow card) 21'	Report	Wiedt (yellow card) 17'; Cicerone 42'; Lopez (yellow card) 75'	Stadium: Southwest University Park; Attendance: 7,136; Referee: Elton Garcia

March 15, 2023 2	El Paso Locomotive FC	1–2	Colorado Springs Switchbacks FC	El Paso, Texas
8:00 pm MDT	Zacarías 48'; Pávkovics (yellow card) 56'; Herrera (yellow card) 82'	Report	Henríquez 2'; Williams (yellow card) 64'; Skundrich (yellow card) 90+2'; Lacroix 90+2'	Stadium: Southwest University Park; Attendance: 5,516; Referee: Matthew Thompson

March 18, 2023 3	El Paso Locomotive FC	1–3	Detroit City FC	El Paso, Texas
8:30 pm MDT	Kostyshyn 17'; Calvillo (yellow card) 52'; Borelli (yellow card) 79'	Report	Yuma 9' (o.g.); Matthews (yellow card) 57' (goal) 60'; Rodriguez 78'	Stadium: Southwest University Park; Attendance: 5,014; Referee: Greg Dopka

March 25, 2023 4	Louisville City FC	0–3	El Paso Locomotive FC	Louisville, Kentucky
2:00 pm CDT	Moguel (yellow card) 41'; Gibson (yellow card) 90+1'	Report	Rose (yellow card) 23'; Navarro 39'; Zacarías 45'; Solicnac (yellow card) 52'; Petrović 57'	Stadium: Lynn Family Stadium; Attendance: 10,881; Referee: Elvis Osmanovic

March 31, 2023 5	FC Tulsa	2–2	El Paso Locomotive FC	Tulsa, Oklahoma
8:00 pm CDT	Fernandez (yellow card) 6' da Costa 33'; Suárez (yellow card) 41'; Bourgeois (yellow card) 67'; Dyer 90+1'	Report	Solignac 38', 68', (yellow card) 60'; Kostyshyn (yellow card) 49'; Zacarías (yellow card) 88'; Hinds (yellow card) 90+3'	Stadium: Oneok Field; Attendance: 4,003; Referee: Brandon Stevis

April 8, 2023 6	El Paso Locomotive FC	1–0	Orange County SC	El Paso, Texas
8:30 pm MDT	Lyons (yellow card) 4'; Pávkovics (yellow card) 6'; Solignac 19'; Zacarías (yellow card) 44'; Kostyshyn (yellow card) 74'	Report	Fox (yellow card) 58'	Stadium: Southwest University Park; Attendance: 6,013; Referee: Cristian Campo Hernandez

April 22, 2023 7	El Paso Locomotive FC	2–0	Pittsburgh Riverhounds SC	El Paso, Texas
8:30 pm MDT	Petrović 39'; Solignac 69', (yellow card) 90'; Kostyshyn (yellow card) 80'; Calvillo (yellow card) 86'; Herrera (yellow card) 90+4'	Report	Biasi (yellow card) 11'; Harmon (yellow card) 63'; Farrell (yellow card) 66'; Ordoñez (yellow card) 90+2'	Stadium: Southwest University Park; Referee: Malik Badawi

April 29, 2023 8	San Diego Loyal SC	1–2	El Paso Locomotive FC	San Diego, California
9:00 pm PDT	Corona (yellow card) 7'; Guido (yellow card) 45'; Perez (yellow card) 60'; Moshobane 61'	Report	Calvillo (yellow card) 9'; Zacarías 13'; Clarhaut (yellow card) 23'; Pávkovics (yellow card) 56'; Kostyshyn 65'; Borelli (yellow card) 82'; Lyons (yellow card) 88'; Herrera (yellow card) 90+6'	Stadium: Torero Stadium; Referee: Katja Koroleva

May 5, 2023 9	Colorado Springs Switchbacks FC	2–3	El Paso Locomotive FC	Colorado Springs, Colorado
8:00 pm MDT	Ockford 61'; Musa (yellow card) 63'; Henríquez (yellow card) 70'; Williams (yellow card) 76', (goal) 88' (pen.)	Report	Solignac 10'; Petrović 13'; Lyons (yellow card) 36'; Calvillo (yellow card) 60'; Sonupe 74'	Stadium: Weidner Field; Attendance: 8,023; Referee: Elvis Osmanovic

May 13, 2023 10	El Paso Locomotive FC	1–0	Loudoun United FC	El Paso, Texas
8:30 pm MDT	Rose (yellow card) 29'; Gómez (yellow card) 64'; Garcia 89'; Pávkovics (yellow card) 90+1'; Borelli (yellow card) 90+5'	Report	Chica (yellow card) 42'; Zanne (yellow card) 85'; Koanda (yellow card) 90+5'	Stadium: Southwest University Park; Attendance: 6,723; Referee: Melvin Rivas

May 20, 2023 11	Birmingham Legion FC	1–2	El Paso Locomotive FC	Birmingham, Alabama
6:30 pm CDT	Agudelo 17'; Asiedu (yellow card) 55'	Report	Solignac 19'; Rose 58'	Stadium: Protective Stadium; Referee: Matthew Thompson

June 3, 2023 12	New Mexico United	0–1	El Paso Locomotive FC	Albuquerque, New Mexico
8:00 pm MDT	Bruce (yellow card) 83'	Report	Kostyshyn 71'; McCue (yellow card) 73'; Herrera (yellow card) 89'; Pávkovics (yellow card) 90+6'	Stadium: Isotopes Park; Attendance: 11,247; Referee: Matthew Corrigan

June 10, 2023 13 Copa Tejas	San Antonio FC	2–2	El Paso Locomotive FC	San Antonio, Texas
8:30 pm CDT	Taintor 4', (yellow card) 45+3'; Abu (yellow card) 7'; Hernandez (yellow card) 56'; Adeniran 60'; Marcina (yellow card) 67'	Report	Gómez 11'; Navarro (yellow card) 15'; McCue (yellow card) 36'; Solignac (yellow card) 45+2', (goal) 78'	Stadium: Toyota Field; Attendance: 4,706; Referee: Alexis Da Silva

June 14, 2023 14	El Paso Locomotive FC	2–1	Las Vegas Lights FC	El Paso, Texas
8:00 pm MDT	Solignac 24' (pen.); McCue 32'; Rose (yellow card) 67'; Pávkovics (yellow card) 74'	Report	Etaka 3'; Lage (yellow card) 28'; Sánchez (yellow card) 29'; Carleton (yellow card) 31'; Bagley (yellow card) 47'	Stadium: Southwest University Park; Attendance: 6,155; Referee: Elijio Arreguin

June 17, 2023 15	El Paso Locomotive FC	1–1	Tampa Bay Rowdies	El Paso, Texas
8:30 pm MDT	Borelli (yellow card) 19'; Kostyshyn 63'; Gómez (yellow card) 75'	Report	LaCava 52'	Stadium: Southwest University Park; Attendance: 8,121; Referee: Gerald Flores

July 1, 2023 16	El Paso Locomotive FC	0–1	New Mexico United	El Paso, Texas
8:30 pm MDT	McCue (yellow card) 16'; Pávkovics (yellow card) 86'	Report	Portillo (yellow card) 39'; Bruce (yellow card) 51'; Moreno (yellow card) 70'; Moar 89', (yellow card) 89'	Stadium: Southwest University Park; Attendance: 8,411; Referee: Elton García

July 8, 2023 17	Monterey Bay FC	0–0	El Paso Locomotive FC	Monterey Bay, California
9:00 pm PDT	Rebollar (yellow card) 42'; Murphy (yellow card) 54'; Fehr (yellow card) 57'	Report	Calvillo (yellow card) 35'; Díaz (yellow card) 69'; Borelli (yellow card) 88'	Stadium: Cardinale Stadium; Attendance: 3,711; Referee: Brandon Stevis

July 12, 2023 18 Copa Tejas	El Paso Locomotive FC	1–1	San Antonio FC	El Paso, Texas
8:00 pm MDT	Calvillo (yellow card) 22'; Solignac (yellow card) 66'; Zacarías (yellow card) 77'; Rose (yellow card) 80'; Gómez 88'; Navarro (yellow card) 90+6'	Report	Cabrera 38', (yellow card) 41'; Benítez (yellow card) 71'	Stadium: Southwest University Park; Attendance: 5,785; Referee: Abdou Ndiaye

July 15, 2023 19 Copa Tejas	El Paso Locomotive FC	1–1	Rio Grande Valley FC Toros	El Paso, Texas
8:30 pm MDT	Calvillo (yellow card) 22'; Solignac (yellow card) 66'; Zacarías (yellow card) 77'; Rose (yellow card) 80'; Gómez 88'; Navarro (yellow card) 90+6'	Report	Cabrera 38', (yellow card) 41'; Benítez (yellow card) 71'	Stadium: Southwest University Park; Attendance: 5,589; Referee: Abdou Ndiaye

July 22, 2023 20	El Paso Locomotive FC	1–3	Oakland Roots SC	El Paso, Texas
8:30 pm MDT	Petrović (yellow card) 29', (goal) 48'; Zacarías (yellow card) 51'; Borelli (yellow card) 72'	Report	Tamacas (yellow card) 52'; Mfeka 65'; Rodriguez 69'; Matsoso (yellow card) 74'; Peláez 85'	Stadium: Southwest University Park; Attendance: 6,795; Referee: Eric Tattersall

July 29, 2023 21 Copa Tejas	Rio Grande Valley FC Toros	5–2	El Paso Locomotive FC	Edinburg, Texas
7:00 pm CDT	Davila 7', 20'; Calvillo 34' (o.g.); Cabrera 59'; Kinzner (yellow card) 70'; Torres 74' (pen.); López (yellow card) 86'	Report	Solignac 3' (pen.); Gómez 16', (yellow card) 51'; Zacarías (yellow card) 24'; Calvillo (yellow card) 40'	Stadium: H-E-B Park; Attendance: 4,730; Referee: Alejo Calume

August 5, 2023 22	Miami FC	4–0	El Paso Locomotive FC	Westchester, Florida
6:00 pm EDT	Rivas 13', 46+3' (pen.); Ofeimu (yellow card) 62'; Hinds 90+1' (o.g.) de Freitas 90+4'	Report	Gómez (yellow card) 45+1'; Clarhaut (yellow card) 45+3' (yellow-red card) 45+3'; Navarro (yellow card) 48'	Stadium: Riccardo Silva Stadium; Attendance: 1,133; Referee: Calin Radosav

August 12, 2023 23	Phoenix Rising FC	5–0	El Paso Locomotive FC	Phoenix, Arizona
9:30 pm MST	Munjoma 22', (yellow card) 61'; Zambrano (yellow card) 30'; Armenakas (yellow card) 43'; Trejo 44', 70'; Formella 85' (pen.); Torres 88'; Uzochukwu (yellow card) 89'	Report	Díaz (yellow card) 58'; McCue (yellow card) 60'	Stadium: Phoenix Rising Stadium; Referee: Alexis Da Silva

August 19, 2023 24	El Paso Locomotive FC	2–3	Indy Eleven	El Paso, Texas
8:30 pm MDT	Calvillo 21'; Zacarías (yellow card) 32'; Calvillo (yellow card) 45+3'; Navarro 55'; Díaz (yellow card) 58'	Report	Chapman-Page (yellow card) 45+3', (goal) 64'; Blake (yellow card) 47'; Guenzatti 53'; Martínez 71'	Stadium: Southwest University Park; Attendance: 6,684; Referee: Gerald Flores

August 26, 2023 25	Hartford Athletic	0–2	El Paso Locomotive FC	Hartford, Connecticut
6:00 pm EDT	Torres (yellow card) 10'; Hodge (yellow card) 54'; Namazi (yellow card) 87'; Logue (yellow card) 90+3'	Report	Gòmez 14'; Dollenmeyer (yellow card) 19'; Rose (yellow card) 48'; Petrović 69'; Lyons (yellow card) 84'	Stadium: Trinity Health Stadium; Attendance: 5,193; Referee: Joe Surgan

September 2, 2023 26	El Paso Locomotive FC	1–2	Monterey Bay FC	El Paso, Texas
8:30 pm MDT	Petrović 30'	Report	Dixon 44'; Okoli 75'	Stadium: Southwest University Park; Attendance: 7,144; Referee: Natalie Simon

September 9, 2023 27	Orange County SC	0–0	El Paso Locomotive FC	Irvine, California
9:00 pm PDT		Report		Stadium: Championship Soccer Stadium; Attendance: 5,500; Referee: Ramy Touchan

September 13, 2023 28	Las Vegas Lights FC	0–1	El Paso Locomotive FC	Las Vegas, Nevada
9:30 pm PDT		Report	Lyons 12'	Stadium: Cashman Field; Referee: Kevin Broadley

September 16, 2023 29	Sacramento Republic FC	1–0	El Paso Locomotive FC	Sacramento, California
9:00 pm PDT	Felipe 90+4'	Report		Stadium: Heart Health Park; Attendance: 11,569; Referee: Brandon Stevis

September 23, 2023 30	El Paso Locomotive FC	1–1	Phoenix Rising FC	El Paso, Texas
8:30 pm MDT	Gómez 56'	Report	Formella 90+1'	Stadium: Southwest University Park; Attendance: 6,708; Referee: Nabil Bensalah

September 30, 2023 31	El Paso Locomotive FC	3–2	Charleston Battery	El Paso, Texas
8:30 pm MDT	Petrović 33'; Sonupe 75'; Calvillo 84'	Report	Williams 38'; Ycaza 71'	Stadium: Southwest University Park; Attendance: 6,736; Referee: Joshua Encarnación

October 4, 2023 32	El Paso Locomotive FC	0–0	San Diego Loyal SC	El Paso, Texas
8:00 pm MDT		Report		Stadium: Southwest University Park; Attendance: 6,792; Referee: Gerald Flores

October 8, 2023 33	Memphis 901 FC	4–0	El Paso Locomotive FC	Memphis, Tennessee
7:00 pm CDT	Ward 31'; Turci 45+3'; Fernando 58'; Kissiedou 60'	Report		Stadium: AutoZone Park; Attendance: 3,537; Referee: Calin Radosav

October 14, 2023 34	Oakland Roots SC	1–2	El Paso Locomotive FC	Oakland, California
9:00 pm PDT	Peláez 47'	Report	Sonupe 7'; Dollenmayer 14'	Stadium: Laney Football Stadium; Attendance: 6,135; Referee: Abdou Ndiaye

=== USL Championship Playoffs ===
October 21, 2023 First Round	Orange County SC	1–0	El Paso Locomotive FC	Irvine, California
7:30 pm PDT	M. Iloski 45+1'	Report		Stadium: Championship Soccer Stadium; Attendance: 5,500; Referee: Natalie Simon

=== U.S. Open Cup ===
April 5, 2023 Second Round	Union Omaha (Nebraska)	2–0	(Texas) El Paso Locomotive	Omaha, Nebraska
7:00 pm CDT	Gallardo (yellow card) 11'; Palacios 58'; Dos Santos 75'; Mueller (yellow card) 87'	Report	Gómez (yellow card) 22'; Herrera (yellow card) 49'; Zacarías (yellow card) 72'; Borelli (yellow card) 84'	Stadium: Morrison Stadium; Attendance: 548; Referee: Velimir Stefanovic

== Awards and honors ==
=== USL Championship Team of the Matchday ===
Matchday	Player	Opponent	Position	Ref
3	(Spain) Marc Navarro	Louisville City FC	DF	
4	(Ukraine) Denys Kostyshyn	FC Tulsa	FW	
7	(Mexico) Éder Borelli	Pittsburgh Riverhounds SC	DF	
9	(Mexico) Éder Borelli (2)	Colorado Springs Switchbacks FC	DF	
9	(Sweden) Petar Petrović	Colorado Springs Switchbacks FC	MF	
10	(Mexico) Benny Díaz	Loudoun United	GK	
13	(Mexico) Éder Borelli (3)	New Mexico United	DF	
13	(Ukraine) Denys Kostyshyn (2)	New Mexico United	FW	
15	(Sweden) Erik McCue	Tampa Bay Rowdies	DF	
18	(Sweden) Erik McCue (2)	Monterey Bay FC	DF	
30	(Sweden) Eric Calvillo	Charleston Battery	MF	
32	(Mexico) Benny Díaz (2)	Oakland Roots SC	GK	

=== Goal of the Matchday ===
Matchday	Player	Opponent	Position	Ref
7	(Sweden) Petar Petrović	Pittsburgh Riverhounds SC	MF	
