= 2022 El Paso Locomotive FC season =

El Paso Locomotive FC
2022 season
- Head coach: John Hutchinson
- Stadium: Southwest University Park, El Paso, TX
- USL: 8th Place, Western Conference
- USL Cup Playoffs: DNQ
- 2022 U.S. Open Cup: Second round
- Copa Tejas Division II: Third place
- Copa Tejas Shield: Sixth Place
- Highest home attendance: 8,124 (3/19 v. NMU)
- Lowest home attendance: 5,077 (3/23 v. LV)
- Average home league attendance: 6,517
- Biggest win: ELP 5–0 MB (4/9)
- Biggest defeat: OAK 4-0 ELP (7/16)
Home colours	Away colours	Third colours

The 2022 El Paso Locomotive FC season was the fourth season for El Paso Locomotive FC in the USL Championship (USLC), the second-tier professional soccer league in the United States and Canada. El Paso Locomotive FC also participates in the U.S. Open Cup and competes with all other professional teams in Texas for the Copa Tejas.

== Kits ==
Home	Away	Third	Fourth	Fifth

== Roster ==
As of final match on October 12, 2022

No.	Position	Player	Nation
1	GK	USA	Evan Newton
4	DF	ENG	Andrew Fox
5	DF	MEX	Éder Borelli
6	MF	IRL	Richie Ryan
7	FW	MEX	Aarón Gómez
8	MF	ESA	Eric Calvillo
9	FW	ARG	Luis Solignac
10	MF	USA	Dylan Mares
12	FW	GRN	Shavon John-Brown
13	DF	USA	Matt Bahner
14	MF	ESP	Ander Egiluz
16	DF	USA	Miles Lyons
17	FW	USA	Ricardo Zacarías
18	FW	USA	Christopher Garcia (on loan from Real Salt Lake)
20	MF	USA	Chapa Herrera
21	MF	ENG	Emmanuel Sonupe
22	MF	AUS	Liam Rose
23	MF	HAI	Christiano François
24	MF	ESP	Yuma
25	GK	USA	Marco Canales
27	GK	GER	Philipp Beigl
31	DF	JAM	Nick Hinds
33	MF	COL	Martín Payares
50	MF	USA	Diego García
53	FW	USA	Noe Coutino
54	MF	USA	Venancio Calderon
57	DF	USA	Jaime Villagomez
73	DF	USA	Raul Vazquez
77	DF	USA	Diego Abarca
79	GK	USA	Rommel Tarin
88	MF	USA	Joel Maldonado
92	DF	USA	Oscar Sosa
99	FW	USA	Bryan Salas

== Transfers ==
=== In ===
Date	No.	Pos.	Player	From	Fee	Source
December 16, 2021	21	MF	(England) Emmanuel Sonupe	(England) Dartford	Undisclosed	
December 21, 2021	33	DF	(Colombia) Martín Payares	(Colombia) Patriotas Boyacá	Undisclosed	
January 10, 2022	27	GK	(Germany) Philipp Beigl	(United States) New Mexico United	Free	
January 11, 2022	8	MF	(El Salvador) Eric Calvillo	(United States) San Jose Earthquakes	Free	
January 18, 2022	31	DF	(Jamaica) Nick Hinds	(United States) Nashville	Free	
January 21, 2022	2	DF	(England) Harry Brockbank	(England) Bolton Wanderers	Undisclosed	
February 8, 2022	23	MF	(Haiti) Christiano François	(United States) Miami	Free	
February 15, 2022	14	DF	(Spain) Ander Egiluz	Free agent	Free	
March 1, 2022	12	DF	(Grenada) Shavon John-Brown	Free agent	Free	
May 16, 2022	22	MF	(Australia) Liam Rose	(Australia) Macarthur	Free	
July 14, 2022	16	DF	(United States) Miles Lyons	(United States) Barcelona Academy	Free	
August 4, 2022	25	GK	(United States) Marco Canales	(Mexico) Juárez U20	Undisclosed	
August 8, 2022	19	DF	(Ukraine) Artem Kholod	(Ukraine) Shakhtar Donetsk	Undisclosed	

=== Out ===
Date	No.	Pos.	Player	To	Fee	Source
December 1, 2021	25	MF	(Colombia) Bryam Rebellón	(United States) Indy Eleven	Free	
December 1, 2021	19	MF	(Spain) José Aguinaga	(Spain) Torrijos	Free	
December 3, 2021	4	DF	(Haiti) Mechack Jérôme	(United States) Indy Eleven	Free	
December 18, 2021	1	GK	(United States) Logan Ketterer	(Canada) Montréal	Free	
December 18, 2021	8	MF	(Scotland) Nick Ross	(United States) Sacramento Republic	Free	
December 18, 2021	9	FW	(Brazil) Leandro Carrijó	Free agent	Free	
January 7, 2022	27	DF	(England) Macauley King	(United States) Colorado Switchbacks	Undisclosed	
January 7, 2022	20	DF	(Northern Ireland) Niall Logue	(United States) Memphis 901	Undisclosed	
May 20, 2022	2	DF	(England) Harry Brockbank	(Republic of Ireland) St Pat's Athletic	Free	
June 2, 2022	15	MF	(United States) Diego Luna	(United States) Real Salt Lake	$250,000	

=== Loans in ===
Date	No.	Pos.	Player	From	Source
January 25, 2022	1	GK	(United States) Evan Newton	(Canada) Vancouver Whitecaps FC	
July 15, 2022	28	FW	(Dominican Republic) Edison Azcona	(United States) Inter Miami CF	
September 1, 2022	18	FW	(United States) Christopher Garcia	(United States) Real Salt Lake	

== Competitions ==
=== USL Championship ===
==== Standings — Western Conference ====
Pos	Team	Pld	W	L	T	GF	GA	GD	Pts	Qualification
1	San Antonio FC (C, X)	34	24	5	5	54	26	+28	77	Qualification for the Conference Semifinals
2	San Diego Loyal SC	34	18	10	6	68	55	+13	60	Playoffs
3	Colorado Springs Switchbacks	34	17	13	4	59	53	+6	55	Playoffs
4	Sacramento Republic	34	15	11	8	48	34	+14	53	Playoffs
5	New Mexico United	34	13	9	12	49	40	+9	51	Playoffs
6	Rio Grande Valley Toros	34	14	13	7	51	40	+11	49	Playoffs
7	Oakland Roots SC	34	11	10	13	51	46	+5	46	Playoffs
8	El Paso Locomotive FC	34	13	14	7	56	52	+4	46	
9	Las Vegas Lights FC	34	12	13	9	40	50	−10	45	
10	Phoenix Rising FC	34	12	16	6	50	58	−8	42	
11	LA Galaxy II	34	11	16	7	53	63	−10	40	
12	Monterey Bay FC	34	12	18	4	42	59	−17	40	
13	Orange County SC	34	7	14	13	49	59	−10	34	

Source: USL Championship Standings
Rules for classification: 1) head-to-head points; 2) head-to-head goal differential; 3) points-per game within conference; 4) total wins; 5) total goal differential; 6) total goals scored; 7) points earned against top four Conference finishers; 8) disciplinary points; 9) coin toss or drawing of lots
(C) Champions; (X) Regular Season League Champion

==== Match results ====
March 12, 2022 1	Sacramento Republic FC	3–1	El Paso Locomotive FC	Sacramento, CA
7:00 PM PDT	Casey (yellow card) 8'; López 45+5' (pen.); Ross (yellow card) 58'; Martínez 84'; Keko (yellow card) 88' (goal) 90+1'	Report	Ryan (penalty missed) 9', (yellow card) 45+4'; Sonupe 27'; Payares (yellow card) 31'; Newton (yellow card) 45+3'; Luna (yellow card) 45+4'	Stadium: Heart Health Park; Attendance: 11,569; Referee: Elton García

March 19, 2022 2	El Paso Locomotive FC	1–2	New Mexico United	El Paso, TX
7:00 PM CDT	Mares 22' (yellow card) 30'; Fox (yellow card) 29'; Brockbank (yellow card) 44'; Zacarías (yellow card) 51'; Hinds (yellow card) 90+4'	Report	Brett 32'; Portillo (yellow card) 44'; Souahy (yellow card) 51'; Etaka 66'; Seymore (yellow card) 77'; Wehan (yellow card) 81'	Stadium: Southwest University Park; Attendance: 8,124; Referee: Malik Badawi

March 23, 2022 3	El Paso Locomotive FC	4–5	Las Vegas Lights FC	El Paso, TX
8:00 PM CDT	François (yellow card) 27'; Hinds 59'; Zacarías 65'; Brockbank (yellow card) 68' (goal) 70'; Solignac (yellow card) 75'; Borelli (yellow card) 88'; Mares 90+1'	Report	Jennings (yellow card) 17' (goal) 53', 56'; Almaguer (yellow card) 22'; Keinan (yellow card) 31'; Trejo 55', 60'; Gaines 73'; Daroma (red card) 88'; Lara (yellow card) 90+6'	Stadium: Southwest University Park; Attendance: 5,077; Referee: Brandon Stevis

April 3, 2022 4	San Diego Loyal SC	3–2	El Paso Locomotive FC	San Diego, CA
4:00 PM CDT	Vassell 21'; Moshobane 40'; K. Adams (yellow card) 47'; Amang 66'; C. Martin (yellow card) 69'; Blake (yellow card) 79'; Hackworth (yellow card) 90+4'	Report	Luna (yellow card) 19'; Brockbank 26' (yellow card) 56'; Sonupe (yellow card) 31'; Yuma (yellow card) 84'; Gómez 87'; Borelli (yellow card) 90+5'	Stadium: Torero Stadium; Attendance: 3,800; Referee: Matthew Thompson

April 9, 2022 5	El Paso Locomotive FC	5–0	Monterey Bay FC	El Paso, TX
8:30 PM CDT	Fox 19' (yellow card) 54'; Herrera (yellow card) 21'; Gómez 35' (pen.) 47'; Luna 51'; Yuma (yellow card) 64'; Mares 75'	Report	Crawford (yellow card) 9' (yellow-red card) 45+1'; Strong (yellow card) 41'; Conneh (yellow card) 90'	Stadium: Southwest University Park; Attendance: 7,148; Referee: Jervis Atagana

April 16, 2022 6 Copa Tejas	San Antonio FC	1–0	El Paso Locomotive FC	San Antonio, TX
7:30 PM CDT	Collier 11'; Giro (yellow card) 38'; Garcia (yellow card) 41'; Maloney (yellow card) 69'; Taintor (yellow card) 90+5'	Report	Brockbank (yellow card) 18'; Borelli (yellow card) 64'; Luna (yellow card) 90+7'	Stadium: Toyota Field; Attendance: 5,167; Referee: Luis Guardia

April 23, 2022 7	El Paso Locomotive FC	1–1	Oakland Roots SC	El Paso, TX
8:30 PM CDT	Solignac 31'; Mares (yellow card) 82'; Borelli (yellow card) 88'	Report	Formella 13'; Nane (yellow card) 38'; Enríquez (yellow card) 69'	Stadium: Southwest University Park; Attendance: 5,727; Referee: Mark Allatin

April 30, 2022 8	Loudoun United FC	1–3	El Paso Locomotive FC	Leesburg, VA
5:00 PM CDT	Guediri 28' (pen.); Houssou (yellow card) 39'; Hope-Gund (yellow card) 44'; Downs (yellow card) 49'; Rice (yellow card) 67'; Liadi (red card) 87'	Report	Bahner (yellow card) 27'; Brockbank (yellow card) 40'; Herrera (yellow card) 65'; Solignac 68' (pen.), 90+5'; Luna 81', (yellow card) 83'; Borelli (yellow card) 90+1'	Stadium: Segra Field; Referee: Matthew Franz

May 4, 2022 9	El Paso Locomotive FC	3–1	FC Tulsa	El Paso, TX
8:00 PM CDT	Mares 11'; Solignac 64', 89'; Borelli (yellow card) 84'	Report	Williams 8' (yellow card) 55'; Moloto (red card) 33' da Costa (yellow card) 33'; Čuić (yellow card) 74'; Silva (yellow card) 85'	Stadium: Southwest University Park; Attendance: 5,381; Referee: Elton García

May 7, 2022 10	El Paso Locomotive FC	4–0	LA Galaxy II	El Paso, TX
8:30 PM CDT	Calvillo 16' (yellow card) 90+1'; Ryan (yellow card) 19'; Doyle 32' (o.g.); Bahner (yellow card) 60'; Solignac 73'	Report	Williams (yellow card) 10'; Judd (yellow card) 48'; Doyle (yellow card) 72'	Stadium: Southwest University Park; Attendance: 6,378; Referee: Matthew Thompson

May 14, 2022 11	Pittsburgh Riverhounds SC	1–0	El Paso Locomotive FC	Pittsburgh, PA
6:00 PM CDT	Ordoñez (yellow card) 27'; Dossantos (yellow card) 43'; Cicerone 46'; Dikwa (yellow card) 89'	Report		Stadium: Highmark Stadium; Attendance: 3,749; Referee: Kevin Fikar

May 18, 2022 12	El Paso Locomotive FC	1–0	Sacramento Republic FC	El Paso, TX
8:00 PM CDT	Solignac (yellow card) 45+2'; Fox 75'; Luna (yellow card) 77'; Yuma (yellow card) 82'; Mares (yellow card) 85'	Report	López (yellow card) 31'; Felipe (yellow card) 72'; Martínez (red card) 81'	Stadium: Southwest University Park; Attendance: 5,521; Referee: Matthew Corrigan

May 21, 2022 13	Orange County SC	2–2	El Paso Locomotive FC	Irvine, CA
9:00 PM CDT	Gorskie (yellow card) 25'; Iloski 30'; Pedersen (yellow card) 43'; Torres 78'	Report	Hinds (yellow card) 16'; Solignac 52'; Yuma (yellow card) 55'; Luna 70'; Gómez (yellow card) 87'	Stadium: Championship Soccer Stadium; Attendance: 4,477; Referee: Natalie Simon

May 27, 2022 14	Las Vegas Lights FC	0–1	El Paso Locomotive FC	Las Vegas, NV
9:00 PM CDT	Traore (yellow card) 38'; Björshol (yellow card) 59'; Keinan (yellow card) 90+5'	Report	Yuma (yellow card) 17'; Solignac (yellow card) 37' (yellow-red card) 44'; Mares 62'; Ryan (yellow card) 71'	Stadium: Cashman Field

June 4, 2022 15	El Paso Locomotive FC	1–1	Hartford Athletic	El Paso, TX
8:30 PM CDT	Eigluz (yellow card) 28'; Borelli (yellow card) 40'; Abarca 56'	Report	Barrera (yellow card) 31'; Prpa (yellow card) 34'; Vassell 68'; Boudadi (yellow card) 76'	Stadium: Southwest University Park; Attendance: 6,715; Referee: Joshua Encarnación

June 11, 2022 16	Phoenix Rising FC	0–1	El Paso Locomotive FC	Tempe, AZ
9:30 PM CDT	Hurst (yellow card) 4'; Seijas (yellow card) 45'; Farrell (yellow card) 62'; King (yellow card) 66'; Madrid (red card) 69'	Report	Zacarías (yellow card) 36'; Fox (yellow card) 43'; Gómez 71' (pen.) (yellow card) 85'; Garcia (yellow card) 88'	Stadium: Phoenix Rising Soccer Complex; Referee: Elijio Arreguin

June 18, 2022 17	Detroit City FC	1–1	El Paso Locomotive FC	Hamtramck, MI
11:00 AM CDT	Amoo-Mensah (yellow card) 18'; Faz 23'; Diop (yellow card) 29'	Report	Calvillo 32'; Yuma (yellow card) 67'	Stadium: Keyworth Stadium; Attendance: 7,267; Referee: Matthew Conger

June 25, 2022 18	El Paso Locomotive FC	5–0	New York Red Bulls II	El Paso, TX
8:30 PM CDT	François 4'; Calvillo 12' 36'; Hinds 19'; John-Brown (yellow card) 41'; Gómez 74'; Yuma (yellow card) 87'	Report	De Leon (yellow card) 38'; Worth (yellow card) 44'; Rafanello (yellow card) 60'; Marcucci (yellow card) 87'	Stadium: Southwest University Park; Attendance: 6,754; Referee: Luis Guardia

June 29, 2022 19 Copa Tejas	Rio Grande Valley FC Toros	0–0	El Paso Locomotive FC	Edinburg, TX
7:30 PM CDT	Hernández (yellow card) 83'	Report	Sonupe (yellow card) 32'; Yuma (yellow card) 61' (yellow-red card) 83'; Velásquez (yellow card) 90'	Stadium: H-E-B Park; Attendance: 2,519; Referee: Gerald Flores

July 2, 2022 20	Atlanta United 2	2–2	El Paso Locomotive FC	Kennesaw, GA
6:30 PM CDT	Trager 11', 17'; Conway (yellow card) 44'; Mertz (yellow card) 68'; Chukwuma (yellow card) 89'	Report	Solignac 4'; Gómez (yellow card) 34'; Fox (yellow card) 35'; Zacarías (yellow card) 40' (yellow-red card) 90+4'; Calvillo 90+1'	Stadium: Fifth Third Bank Stadium; Attendance: 534; Referee: José Carlos Rivero

July 9, 2022 21	El Paso Locomotive FC	1–0	Colorado Springs Switchbacks FC	El Paso, TX
8:30 PM CDT	Gómez 18'; Ryan (yellow card) 44'; Payares (yellow card) 45+3'; Bahner (yellow card) 52'; Solignac (yellow card) 75' (yellow-red card) 87'; François (yellow card) 79'; Egiluz (yellow card) 85'	Report	Erdmann (yellow card) 28'; Mahoney (red card) 76'; Caldwell (yellow card) 77'	Stadium: Southwest University Park; Attendance: 7,009; Referee: Adam Kilpatrick

July 16, 2022 22	Oakland Roots SC	4–0	El Paso Locomotive FC	Oakland, CA
9:00 PM CDT	Karlsson 21', 32' (pen.); Formella 34'; Hernández 40'; Dennis (yellow card) 86'	Report	Fox 69'; Azcona (yellow card) 90+1'	Stadium: Laney Football Stadium; Attendance: 4,221; Referee: Lorenzo Hernandez

July 23, 2022 23 Copa Tejas	El Paso Locomotive FC	0–1	San Antonio FC	El Paso, TX
8:30 PM CDT	Yuma (yellow card) 43'; Gómez (yellow card) 83'; Azcona (yellow card) 88'	Report	Abdul-Salaam (yellow card) 11'; Patiño 47'; Abu (yellow card) 74'; Gomez (yellow card) 81'	Stadium: Southwest University Park; Attendance: 6,333; Referee: Ricardo Fierro

July 30, 2022 24	El Paso Locomotive FC	0–1	Louisville City FC	El Paso, TX
8:30 PM CDT	Gómez (yellow card) 25'	Report	Asensei 52'; Mushagalusa (yellow card) 77'	Stadium: Southwest University Park; Attendance: 6,461; Referee: Elijio Arreguin

August 6, 2022 25	Monterey Bay FC	1–0	El Paso Locomotive FC	Monterey Bay, CA
9:00 PM CDT	Rebollar (yellow card) 60', (goal) 88'; Murphy (yellow card) 60'	Report	Azconar (yellow card) 38'; Solignac (penalty missed) 45+1'; François (yellow card) 73'; Egiluz (yellow card) 76'; Fox (yellow card) 79'; Gómez (yellow card) 85'	Stadium: Cardinale Stadium; Attendance: 3,328; Referee: Elton García

August 12, 2022 26	Colorado Springs Switchbacks FC	4–4	El Paso Locomotive FC	Colorado Springs, CO
8:00 PM CDT	Barry 4', 6'; Amoh 9'; Erdmann (yellow card) 45+2'; Lindley (yellow card) 52'; Wheeler 90+4', (yellow card) 90+6'	Report	Yuma (yellow card) 13'; Calvillo (yellow card) 24'; Mares 53', 65'; Solignac 57', 67', (yellow card) 80'; Zacarías (yellow card) 58'; Bahner (yellow card) 63'; Eguluz (yellow card) 90+2'; Borelli (yellow card) 90+5'	Stadium: Weidner Field; Attendance: 7,445; Referee: Brandon Stevis

August 20, 2022 27	El Paso Locomotive FC	1–3	San Diego Loyal SC	El Paso, TX
8:30 PM CDT	Borelli (yellow card) 20'; Zacarías (yellow card) 24'; Egiluz (yellow card) 25'; Gómez (yellow card) 51'; Mares 70'; Rose (yellow card) 79'	Report	Vassell 17'; Amang 43'; Vegas (yellow card) 70'; Conway 76'; Stoneman (yellow card) 88'; Guido (yellow card) 90+3'	Stadium: Southwest University Park; Attendance: 6,673; Referee: Sergii Demianchuk

August 27, 2022 28	El Paso Locomotive FC	3–1	Phoenix Rising FC	El Paso, TX
8:30 PM CDT	Bahner (yellow card) 10'; Fox (yellow card) 21'; Solignac 28', 64'; Mares 45+1'; Zacarías (yellow card) 82'	Report	Njie (yellow card) 24'; Flood 65'; Farrell (yellow card) 76'; Calistri (yellow card) 90+1'	Stadium: Southwest University Park; Attendance: 6,870; Referee: John Griggs

September 2, 2022 29	New Mexico United	1–2	El Paso Locomotive FC	Albuquerque, NM
8:30 PM CDT	Frater 22', (yellow card) 32'; Tettah (yellow card) 45'; Ryden (yellow card) 45+4'	Report	Bahner (yellow card) 9'; Solignac 18', 71'; Yuma (yellow card) 87'; Gómez (yellow card) 88'	Stadium: Isotopes Park; Attendance: 10,721; Referee: Ricardo Fierro

September 7, 2022 30 Copa Tejas	El Paso Locomotive FC	0–2	Rio Grande Valley FC Toros	El Paso, TX
8:00 PM CDT	Hinds (yellow card) 13'; Borelli	Report	López 72'; Pinzon 80'; Torres (yellow card) 86'	Stadium: Southwest University Park; Attendance: 7,589; Referee: Mark Allatin

September 18, 2022 31	LA Galaxy II	2–3	El Paso Locomotive FC	Carson, CA
7:00 PM CDT	Dunbar 58' (pen.); Cabral 70'	Report	Mares 5'; Solignac 21'; Calvillo 60' (yellow card) 79'; Zacarías (yellow card) 63'; Gómez (yellow card) 72'; Egiluz (yellow card) 84'; Mares (yellow card) 84'	Stadium: Dignity Health Sports Park; Referee: Malik Badawi

October 5, 2022 32	El Paso Locomotive FC	1–4	Colorado Springs Switchbacks FC	El Paso, TX
8:00 PM CDT	Ryan (yellow card) 23'; Solignac 27', (yellow card) 62'; Bahner (yellow card) 30'; Yuma (yellow card) 37'; Fox (yellow card) 58'; Rose (yellow card) 73'; C. Garcia (yellow card) 83'	Report	Ngalina 22', 59' (pen.), 69'; King (yellow card) 26'; Lindley (yellow card) 45'; Zandi 54'	Stadium: Southwest University Park; Referee: Gerald Flores

October 8, 2022 33	El Paso Locomotive FC	2–1	Orange County SC	El Paso, TX
8:30 PM CDT	Ryan (yellow card) 22'; Solignac 37'; Bahner (yellow card) 38'; Fox 54'; Hinds (yellow card) 90+4'	Report	Rocha (yellow card) 20'; Scott (yellow card) 53'; Jamison 83'	Stadium: Southwest University Park; Referee: Calin Radosav

October 12, 2022 34	Tampa Bay Rowdies	3–1	El Paso Locomotive FC	Tampa Bay, FL
8:30 PM CDT	Fernandes 16', 90+1'; Scarlett (yellow card) 29'; Guenzatti 43'	Report	Egiluz 72'; Ryan (yellow card) 83'; Rose (yellow card) 85'; Maldonado (yellow card) 89'	Stadium: Al Lang Stadium; Attendance: 3,454; Referee: Sergii Demianchuk

==== USL Championship Playoffs ====
For the first time in their history, Locomotive did not qualify for playoffs.

=== U.S. Open Cup ===
April 5, 2022 Second Round	Central Valley Fuego FC (USL1)	4–1	El Paso Locomotive FC (USLC)	Clovis, CA
9:30 PM CDT	Bijev 4', 44'; Smith 15'; Chaney (yellow card) 44' (goal) 62'; Boyal (yellow card) 90+1'	Report	Borelli (yellow card) 24'; John-Brown (yellow card) 26' (yellow-red card) 58'; Gómez (yellow card) 37'; Zacarías (yellow card) 38'; Brockbank (yellow card) 56'; Cavillo (yellow card) 68'; Ryan (yellow card) 68'	Stadium: Lamonica Stadium

=== Statistics ===
Numbers after plus-sign(+) denote appearances as a substitute.

==== Appearances and goals ====
No.	Pos	Nat	Player	Total		USL Championship		Playoffs		U.S. Open Cup	
No.	Pos	Nat	Player	Apps	Goals	Apps	Goals	Apps	Goals	Apps	Goals
1	GK	(United States) USA	Evan Newton	34	0	34+0	0	0+0	0	0+0	0
2	DF	(England) ENG	Harry Brockbank	12	2	9+2	2	0+0	0	0+1	0
4	DF	(England) ENG	Andrew Fox	31	3	30+1	3	0+0	0	0+0	0
5	DF	(Mexico) MEX	Éder Borelli	32	0	24+7	0	0+0	0	1+0	0
6	MF	(Republic of Ireland) IRL	Richie Ryan	33	0	26+6	0	0+0	0	0+1	0
7	FW	(Mexico) MEX	Aarón Gómez	32	6	24+7	6	0+0	0	1+0	0
8	MF	(El Salvador) ESA	Eric Calvillo	32	7	25+6	6	0+0	0	1+0	1
9	FW	(Argentina) ARG	Luis Solignac	27	17	25+1	17	0+0	0	1+0	0
10	MF	(United States) USA	Dylan Mares	29	10	27+2	10	0+0	0	0+0	0
11	MF	(Colombia) COL	Sebastian Velasquez	10	0	5+5	0	0+0	0	0+0	0
12	FW	(Grenada) GRN	Shavon John-Brown	12	0	5+6	0	0+0	0	1+0	0
13	DF	(United States) USA	Matt Bahner	31	0	26+5	0	0+0	0	0+0	0
14	MF	(Spain) ESP	Ander Egiluz	20	1	8+11	1	0+0	0	1+0	0
15	MF	(United States) USA	Diego Luna	11	4	10+0	4	0+0	0	0+1	0
16	DF	(United States) USA	Miles Lyons	2	0	0+2	0	0+0	0	0+0	0
17	FW	(United States) USA	Ricardo Zacarías	28	0	14+14	0	0+0	0	0+0	0
18	FW	(United States) USA	Christopher Garcia	6	0	2+4	0	0+0	0	0+0	0
19	DF	(Ukraine) UKR	Artem Kholod	3	0	0+3	0	0+0	0	0+0	0
20	MF	(United States) USA	Chapa Herrera	7	0	4+2	0	0+0	0	1+0	0
21	MF	(England) ENG	Emmanuel Sonupe	18	1	9+8	1	0+0	0	0+1	0
22	MF	(Australia) AUS	Liam Rose	12	0	8+4	0	0+0	0	0+0	0
23	MF	(Haiti) HAI	Christiano François	27	1	17+9	1	0+0	0	1+0	0
24	MF	(Spain) ESP	Yuma	29	0	26+2	0	0+0	0	0+1	0
27	GK	(United States) USA	Marco Canales	0	0	0+0	0	0+0	0	0+0	0
27	GK	(Germany) GER	Philipp Beigl	1	0	0+0	0	0+0	0	1+0	0
28	MF	(Dominican Republic) DOM	Edison Azcona	5	0	1+4	0	0+0	0	0+0	0
31	DF	(Jamaica) JAM	Nick Hinds	27	2	12+15	2	0+0	0	0+0	0
33	MF	(Colombia) COL	Martín Payares	6	0	1+4	0	0+0	0	1+0	0
50	MF	(United States) USA	Diego Garcia	1	0	0+1	0	0+0	0	0+0	0
53	FW	(United States) USA	Noe Coutino	7	0	1+6	0	0+0	0	0+0	0
54	MF	(United States) USA	Venancio Calderon	2	0	1+1	0	0+0	0	0+0	0
57	DF	(United States) USA	Jaime Villagomez	0	0	0+0	0	0+0	0	0+0	0
73	DF	(United States) USA	Raul Vazquez	0	0	0+0	0	0+0	0	0+0	0
77	DF	(United States) USA	Diego Abarca	8	1	3+5	1	0+0	0	0+0	0
79	GK	(United States) USA	Rommel Tarin	0	0	0+0	0	0+0	0	0+0	0
88	MF	(United States) USA	Joel Maldonado	5	0	0+5	0	0+0	0	0+0	0
92	DF	(United States) USA	Oscar Sosa	0	0	0+0	0	0+0	0	0+0	0
99	FW	(United States) USA	Bryan Salas	0	0	0+0	0	0+0	0	0+0	0

- Last updated: October 12, 2022
- Source: https://www.uslchampionship.com/el-paso-locomotive-fc-player-stats

=== Top scorers ===
Rank	Position	Number	Name	USL Championship	USL Playoffs	U.S. Open Cup	Total
1	FW	9	(Argentina) Luis Solignac	16	0	1	17
2	MF	10	(United States) Dylan Mares	10	0	0	10
3	MF	8	(El Salvador) Eric Calvillo	6	0	1	7
3	FW	7	(Mexico) Aarón Gómez	6	0	0	6
5	MF	15	(United States) Diego Luna	4	0	0	4
6	DF	4	(England) Andrew Fox	3	0	0	3
7	DF	2	(England) Harry Brockbank	2	0	0	2
7	DF	31	(Jamaica) Nick Hinds	2	0	0	2
9	DF	17	(Spain) Ander Egiluz	1	0	0	1
9	FW	17	(United States) Ricardo Zacarías	1	0	0	1
9	MF	21	(England) Emmanuel Sonupe	1	0	0	1
9	MF	23	(Haiti) Christiano François	1	0	0	1
9	MF	77	(United States) Diego Abarca	1	0	0	1
Total				54	0	1	55

- Last updated: October 12, 2022
- Source: https://www.uslchampionship.com/el-paso-locomotive-fc-player-stats

=== Top assists ===
Rank	Position	Number	Name	USL Championship	USL Playoffs	U.S. Open Cup	Total
1	FW	7	(Mexico) Aarón Gómez	7	0	0	7
1	MF	17	(United States) Ricardo Zacarías	7	0	0	7
1	DF	5	(Mexico) Éder Borelli	6	0	1	7
4	DF	10	(United States) Dylan Mares	5	0	0	5
4	FW	9	(Argentina) Luis Solignac	5	0	0	5
6	MF	6	(Republic of Ireland) Richie Ryan	2	0	0	2
6	MF	15	(United States) Diego Luna	2	0	0	2
6	MF	21	(England) Emmanuel Sonupe	2	0	0	2
9	MF	8	(El Salvador) Eric Calvillo	1	0	0	1
9	MF	4	(England) Andrew Fox	1	0	0	1
9	MF	15	(Colombia) Sebastian Velasquez	1	0	0	1
9	MF	15	(Haiti) Christiano François	1	0	0	1
9	MF	22	(Australia) Liam Rose	1	0	0	1
9	FW	53	(United States) Noe Coutino	1	0	0	1
Total				42	0	1	43

- Last updated: October 12, 2022
- Source: https://www.uslchampionship.com/el-paso-locomotive-fc-player-stats

=== Disciplinary record ===
No.	Pos.	Player	USL Championship			USL Playoffs			U.S. Open Cup			Total		
No.	Pos.	Player	Booked	(yellow card) (yellow-red card)	Sent off (straight red)	Booked	(yellow card) (yellow-red card)	Sent off (straight red)	Booked	(yellow card) (yellow-red card)	Sent off (straight red)	Booked	(yellow card) (yellow-red card)	Sent off (straight red)
1	GK	(United States) Evan Newton	1	0	0	0	0	0	0	0	0	1	0	0
2	DF	(England) Harry Brockbank	5	0	0	0	0	0	1	0	0	6	0	0
4	DF	(England) Andrew Fox	8	0	0	0	0	0	0	0	0	8	0	0
5	DF	(Mexico) Éder Borelli	10	0	0	0	0	0	1	0	0	11	0	0
6	MF	(Republic of Ireland) Richie Ryan	7	0	0	0	0	0	1	0	0	8	0	0
7	FW	(Mexico) Aarón Gómez	9	0	0	0	0	0	1	0	0	10	0	0
8	MF	(El Salvador) Eric Calvillo	3	0	0	0	0	0	1	0	0	3	0	0
9	FW	(Argentina) Luis Solignac	4	2	0	0	0	0	0	0	0	4	2	0
10	MF	(United States) Dylan Mares	4	0	0	0	0	0	0	0	0	4	0	0
11	MF	(Colombia) Sebastian Velasquez	1	0	0	0	0	0	0	0	0	1	0	0
12	FW	(Grenada) Shavon John-Brown	1	0	0	0	0	0	0	1	0	1	1	0
13	DF	(United States) Matt Bahner	8	0	0	0	0	0	0	0	0	8	0	0
14	DF	(Spain) Ander Egiluz	6	0	0	0	0	0	0	0	0	6	0	0
15	MF	(United States) Diego Luna	5	0	0	0	0	0	0	0	0	5	0	0
17	FW	(United States) Ricardo Zacarías	7	0	0	0	0	0	1	0	0	8	0	0
18	FW	(United States) Christopher Garcia	1	0	0	0	0	0	1	0	0	1	0	0
20	MF	(United States) Chapa Herrera	2	0	0	0	0	0	0	0	0	2	0	0
21	MF	(England) Emmanuel Sonupe	2	0	0	0	0	0	0	0	0	2	0	0
22	MF	(Australia) Liam Rose	3	0	0	0	0	0	0	0	0	3	0	0
23	MF	(Haiti) Christiano François	3	0	0	0	0	0	0	0	0	3	0	0
24	MF	(Spain) Yuma	11	1	0	0	0	0	0	0	0	11	1	0
28	MF	(Dominican Republic) Edison Azcona	3	0	0	0	0	0	0	0	0	3	0	0
31	DF	(Haiti) Nick Hinds	4	0	0	0	0	0	0	0	0	4	0	0
33	MF	(Colombia) Martín Payares	2	0	0	0	0	0	0	0	0	2	0	0
50	MF	(United States) Diego Garcia	1	0	0	0	0	0	0	0	0	1	0	0
88	MF	(United States) Joel Maldanado	1	0	0	0	0	0	0	0	0	1	0	0
Total			108	3	0	0	0	0	6	1	0	114	4	0

- Last updated: October 12, 2022
- Source: https://www.uslchampionship.com/el-paso-locomotive-fc-player-stats
