= 2021 El Paso Locomotive FC season =

El Paso Locomotive FC
2021 season
- Head coach: Mark Lowry
- Stadium: Southwest University Park, El Paso, TX
- USL: 2nd Western Conference
- USL Cup Playoffs: Conference Quarterfinals
- 2021 U.S. Open Cup: Cancelled
- Copa Tejas: 1st - Division II Cup; 1st - Shield
- Biggest win: OKC Energy FC 4-0 (Oct. 24)
- Biggest defeat: LA Galaxy II 0-5 (Oct. 17)

The 2021 El Paso Locomotive FC season was the third season for El Paso Locomotive FC in the USL Championship (USLC), the second-tier professional soccer league in the United States and Canada. El Paso Locomotive FC also planned to participate in the U.S. Open Cup and competed with all other professional teams in Texas in the Copa Tejas.

== Club ==
=== Roster ===
As of November 5, 2021

No.	Position	Player	Nation
1	GK	USA	Logan Ketterer
3	DF	ENG	Andrew Fox
4	DF	HAI	Mechack Jérôme
5	DF	MEX	Éder Borelli
6	MF	IRL	Richie Ryan
7	FW	MEX	Aarón Gómez
8	MF	SCO	Nick Ross
9	FW	BRA	Leandro Carrijó
10	MF	USA	Dylan Mares
12	GK	USA	Benjamin Beaury
13	DF	USA	Matt Bahner
14	DF	USA	Matthew Lewis
15	MF	USA	Diego Luna
16	FW	ARG	Luis Solignac
17	FW	USA	Ricardo Zacarías
19	MF	ESP	José Aguinaga
22	MF	USA	Cole Turner
23	DF	ENG	Macauley King
24	MF	ESP	Yuma
25	DF	COL	Bryam Rebellón
28	GK	MEX	Marco Canales
30	GK	USA	Javier Beker
38	MF	USA	Louis Herrera
40	MF	USA	Brooklyn Raines
47	GK	ENG	Harrison Shaw
50	MF	USA	Diego Garcia
55	MF	COL	Sebastian Velasquez
57	DF	USA	Jaime Villagomez
88	MF	USA	Joel Maldanado
91	MF	USA	Edwin Villareal
95	GK	USA	Adrian Zendejas

== Competitions ==
=== USL Championship ===
==== Standings — Western Conference ====
Pos	Div	Team	Pld	W	D	L	GF	GA	GD	Pts	Qualification
1	PC	Phoenix Rising FC	32	20	7	5	68	35	+33	67	Playoffs
2	MT	El Paso Locomotive FC	32	18	10	4	56	34	+22	64	Playoffs
3	PC	Orange County SC	32	15	7	10	44	37	+7	52	Playoffs
4	MT	San Antonio FC	32	14	10	8	50	38	+12	52	Playoffs
5	MT	Colorado Springs Switchbacks FC	32	13	10	9	60	50	+10	49	Playoffs
6	PC	San Diego Loyal SC	32	14	6	12	51	43	+8	48	Playoffs
7	MT	Rio Grande Valley FC Toros	32	13	8	11	49	42	+7	47	Playoffs
8	MT	New Mexico United	32	12	10	10	44	40	+4	46	
9	MT	Austin Bold FC	32	10	12	10	32	42	−10	42	
10	PC	Oakland Roots SC	32	11	8	13	36	43	−7	41	Playoffs
11	PC	LA Galaxy II	32	11	6	15	55	57	−2	39	
12	PC	Tacoma Defiance	32	10	9	13	37	41	−4	39	
13	PC	Sacramento Republic FC	32	8	12	12	36	42	−6	36	
14	MT	Real Monarchs	32	5	7	20	28	56	−28	22	
15	PC	Las Vegas Lights FC	32	6	3	23	41	77	−36	21	

Source: USL Championship
Rules for classification: 1) points; 2) head-to-head points; 3) head-to-head goal differential; 4) total points earned against in-division opponents; 5) total regular season wins against in-division opponents; 6) total goal differential against in-division opponents; 7) total goals scored against in-division opponents; 8) disciplinary points; 9) coin toss or drawing of lots.

==== Match results ====
May 8, 2021 1	El Paso Locomotive FC	1-1	New Mexico United	El Paso, TX
	Yuma (yellow card) 7'; Rebellón (yellow card) 26'; Mares (yellow card) 75'; Carrijó 90+5'	Report	Sandoval 57' (yellow card) 87'; Guzmán (yellow card) 66'; Suggs (yellow card) 90+2'	Stadium: Southwest University Park; Attendance: 5740; Referee: Ismir Pekmic

May 22, 2021 2 Copa Tejas	El Paso Locomotive FC	1–0	Rio Grande Valley FC Toros	El Paso, TX
	Solignac 1'; Ryan (yellow card) 45+2'; Mares (yellow card) 77'; Borelli (yellow card) 89'	Report	Amoh (yellow card) 70' (yellow-red card) 80'; Njie (yellow card) 90+5'	Stadium: Southwest University Park; Attendance: 6325; Referee: Lukasz Szpala

May 30, 2021 3	Sporting Kansas City II	0-0	El Paso Locomotive FC	Kansas City, KS
	Kaveh Rad (yellow card) 78'	Report	Borelli (yellow card) 67'; King (yellow card) 90+4'	Stadium: Children's Mercy Park; Referee: Elvis Osmanovic

June 3, 2021 4 Copa Tejas	Austin Bold FC	0-1	El Paso Locomotive FC	Austin, TX
	Ycaza (yellow card) 9'; Garcia (yellow card) 29'; Hinds (yellow card) 47'; Báez (yellow card) 71'; Okoli (yellow card) 87'	Report	Yuma (yellow card) 39'; Rebellón (yellow card) 51'; Luna 56'; Zendejas (yellow card) 81'; Solignac (yellow card) 90+2'	Stadium: Circuit of the Americas#Bold Stadium; Attendance: 791; Referee: Mark Allatin

June 9, 2021 5	El Paso Locomotive FC	2-0	Indy Eleven	El Paso, TX
	Ross 2'; Luna 49'; Rebellón (yellow card) 57'	Report	Koffie (yellow card) 6'; Smith (yellow card) 40'; Ouimette (yellow card) 44'	Stadium: Southwest University Park; Attendance: 5,189; Referee: Jon Freemon

June 12, 2021 6	El Paso Locomotive FC	1-1	Colorado Springs Switchbacks FC	El Paso, TX
	King 12'; Ross (yellow card) 33'; Herrera (yellow card) 58'; Borelli (yellow card) 72'; Ryan (yellow card) 84'	Report	Echeverria (yellow card) 39'; Barry 73' (pen.); Makangila (yellow card) 85'	Stadium: Southwest University Park; Attendance: 6,589; Referee: Elijio Arreguin

June 18, 2021 7	Real Monarchs SLC	1-2	El Paso Locomotive FC	Herriman, UT
	Brown (yellow card) 67'; Ibrahim Bancé (yellow card) 80'; Quintero (yellow card) 88'; Iloski 90+1'	Report	Gómez 1'; Yuma (yellow card) 59'; King 70'; Rebellón (red card) 79'	Stadium: Zions Bank Stadium; Attendance: 800; Referee: Matthew Corrigan

June 30, 2021 8 Copa Tejas	Rio Grande Valley FC Toros	3-2	El Paso Locomotive FC	Edinburg, TX
	Manley 5'; Kuzain 61' (yellow card) 90+3'; Vera (yellow card) 87'	Report	Aguinaga 31'; Luna (yellow card) 77'; Solignac 82'	Stadium: H-E-B Park; Attendance: 2,445; Referee: Brandon Stevis

July 3, 2021 9	El Paso Locomotive FC	2–1	New Mexico United	El Paso, TX
	Borelli (yellow card) 33'; Mares 56', 57'; Jérôme (yellow card) 76'	Report	Brown (yellow card) 33' (goal) 41'; Guzmán (yellow card) 48'	Stadium: Southwest University Park; Attendance: 8,138; Referee: Elvis Osmanovic

July 9, 2021 10	Real Monarchs SLC	1-3	El Paso Locomotive FC	Herriman, UT
	Briggs 19'	Report	Solignac 9'; Zacharías (yellow card) 16'; Luna 74' (yellow card) 76'; Jérôme (yellow card) 88'; Gómez 90+1'	Stadium: Zions Bank Stadium; Attendance: 763; Referee: Adam Kilpatrick

July 17, 2021 11	El Paso Locomotive FC	1-0	Las Vegas Lights FC	El Paso, TX
	Yuma (yellow card) 35'; Gómez 58' (yellow card) 89'; Beaury (yellow card) 90+1'	Report	Daroma (yellow card) 79'	Stadium: Southwest University Park; Attendance: 7,019; Referee: Jeremy Scheer

July 24, 2022 12	New Mexico United	0-0	El Paso Locomotive FC	Albuquerque, NM
	Guzman (yellow card) 26' (yellow-red card) 66'; Tirari (yellow card) 83'	Report	Zacarías (yellow card) 75'; Yuma (yellow card) 90+4'	Stadium: Isotopes Park; Attendance: 10,303; Referee: Greg Dopka

July 28, 2021 13 Copa Tejas	San Antonio FC	1-2	El Paso Locomotive FC	San Antonio, TX
	Lindley (yellow card) 23'; Sjöberg (yellow card) 27' (goal) 74'; Abu (yellow card) 42'	Report	Solignac 18' (pen.); Bahner (yellow card) 30'; Luna (yellow card) 37' (goal) 71'; Ryan (yellow card) 58'	Stadium: Toyota Field; Attendance: 5,273; Referee: Malik Badawi

July 31, 2021 14	El Paso Locomotive FC	3-1	Real Monarchs SLC	El Paso, TX
	Gómez 24'; Jérôme (yellow card) 36'; King (yellow card) 40'; Herrera (yellow card) 64'; Solignac 68', 81'	Report	Wehan 17'; Ramirez (yellow card) 29'; Quintero (yellow card) 68'; Coronel (yellow card) 84'	Stadium: Southwest University Park; Attendance: 6,459; Referee: Luis Guardia

August 4, 2021 15 Copa Tejas	El Paso Locomotive FC	2-0	San Antonio FC	El Paso, TX
	Luna 29'; King (yellow card) 37'; Aguinaga (yellow card) 44' (goal) 45+2'; Jérôme (yellow card) 68'; Rebellón (yellow card) 70' (yellow-red card) 77'	Report	Deplagne (yellow card) 12'; Maloney (yellow card) 56'	Stadium: Southwest University Park; Attendance: 4,688; Referee: Brad Jensen

August 7, 202 16 Copa Tejas	El Paso Locomotive FC	3-0	Austin Bold FC	El Paso, TX
	Fox 59'; Mares 72'; Carrijó 90+3'	Report	Garcia (yellow card) 86'	Stadium: Southwest University Park; Attendance: 5,348; Referee: Michael Radchuk

August 14, 2021 17	New Mexico United	1-1	El Paso Locomotive FC	Albuquerque, NM
	Moreno 33' (yellow card) 64'; Sandoval (yellow card) 75'; Tinari (yellow card) 77'; Bruce (yellow card) 77'	Report	Luna (red card) 77'; Carrijó (yellow card) 79'; Bahner 90+7'	Stadium: Isotopes Park; Attendance: 10,418; Referee: Lukasz Szpala

August 21, 2021 18 Copa Tejas	El Paso Locomotive FC	3-1	Rio Grande Valley FC Toros	El Paso, TX
	Rebellón (yellow card) 7'; Solignac 66'; Velasquez 89'; Mares 90+6'	Report	Murphy (yellow card) 24'; Amoh 38'; Pimentel (yellow card) 82'	Stadium: Southwest University Park; Attendance: 7,017; Referee: Matthew Thompson

August 28, 2021 19 Copa Tejas	San Antonio FC	2-1	El Paso Locomotive FC	San Antonio, TX
	Epps 32'; Victor Giro (yellow card) 41'; Dhillon 90+3' (yellow card) 90+3'	Report	Fox (yellow card) 24'; Velasquez 54'	Stadium: Toyota Field; Attendance: 4,892; Referee: Ricardo Fierro

September 3, 2021 20	Orange County SC	2-2	El Paso Locomotive FC	Irvine, CA
	McCabe (yellow card) 59'; Damus 61'; Okoli 67'	Report	Ross 20'; Luna (yellow card) 63'; Yuma (yellow card) 83'; Ryan (yellow card) 87'; Carrijó 89'; Bahner (yellow card) 90+4'	Stadium: Championship Soccer Stadium; Attendance: 3,215; Referee: Mark Allatin

September 15, 2021 22	Colorado Springs Switchbacks FC	0-0	El Paso Locomotive FC	Colorado Springs, CO
	Echeverria (yellow card) 29'; Beckford (yellow card) 74'	Report	Gómez (yellow card) 25'; Fox (yellow card) 57'	Stadium: Weidner Field; Attendance: 5,370; Referee: William Hoffman

September 22, 2021 23 Copa Tejas	Austin Bold FC	2-2	El Paso Locomotive FC	Austin, TX
	Stéfano Pihno 31'; Taylor (yellow card) 34'; Okugo (yellow card) 56'; Ciss (yellow card) 90+1'; Guadarrama 90+4'	Report	Ryan (yellow card) 57'; King (yellow card) 66'; Luna 70'; Gómez 83'	Stadium: Circuit of the Americas#Bold Stadium; Attendance: 1,022; Referee: Natalie Simon

September 29, 2021 24	El Paso Locomotive FC	1-0	Real Monarchs SLC	El Paso, TX
	Ibrahim Bancé 68' (o.g.); Velasquez (yellow card) 76'; Gómez (yellow card) 90+3'	Report	Saucedo (yellow card) 40'; Davis (yellow card) 59'	Stadium: Southwest University Park; Attendance: 6,275; Referee: Elton García

October 2, 2021 25	Colorado Springs Switchbacks FC	1-1	El Paso Locomotive FC	Colorado Springs, CO
	Mahoney (yellow card) 46'; Ockford (yellow card) 57'; Toure (yellow card) 72'; Bahner 90+1' (o.g.); Lewis (yellow card) 90+4'	Report	Herrera (yellow card) 43'; Carrijó 81'; Aguinaga (yellow card) 85'; Borelli (yellow card) 90+3'	Stadium: Weidner Field; Attendance: 7,268; Referee: Gerald Flores

October 6, 2021 26 Copa Tejas	El Paso Locomotive FC	3-3	San Antonio FC	El Paso, TX
	Yuma (yellow card) 42'; King 57'; Ross 73'; Luna 85'	Report	Dhillon 10'; Deplagne 27' (yellow card) 62'; Ford (yellow card) 45+1'; Nathan (yellow card) 82'; Ford 90+4'	Stadium: Southwest University Park; Attendance: 5,250; Referee: Sergii Demianchuk

October 9, 2021 27	FC Tulsa	1-2	El Paso Locomotive FC	Tulsa, OK
	Rodrigo da Costa 45+1'	Report	Gómez 7'; Solignac 14'	Stadium: ONEOK Field; Attendance: 4,156; Referee: Brandon Stevis

October 9, 2021 28	El Paso Locomotive FC	4-2	Colorado Springs Switchbacks FC	El Paso, TX
	Zacarías 21'; Herrera (yellow card) 33'; King 61'; Borelli (yellow card) 66'; Solignac 86'; Gómez (yellow card) 90'; Luna (yellow card) 90+7' (goal) 90+7'	Report	Barry 5' (yellow card) 26'; Argueta (yellow card) 28'; Beckford 35'; Edwards (yellow card) 51'; Hodge (yellow card) 60'; Ockford (yellow card) 90+5'	Stadium: Southwest University Park; Attendance: 5,055; Referee: Jeremy Scheer

October 17, 2021 29	LA Galaxy II	5-0	El Paso Locomotive FC	Carson, CA
	Vázquez (yellow card) 5'; C. Harvey 7'; Judd 17', 30'; Hernández 69'; Ferkranus (yellow card) 75'; Dunbar 90+3'	Report	Fox (yellow card) 22'; Carrijó (yellow card) 40'; Aguinaga (yellow card) 49'; Solignac (yellow card) 58'	Stadium: Dignity Health Sports Park; Referee: Brad Jensen

October 20, 2021 30 Copa Tejas	El Paso Locomotive FC	3-0	Austin Bold FC	El Paso, TX
	Gómez 23' (yellow card) 34'; Solignac 48'; Luna 90'	Report	Rissi (yellow card) 36'; Diouf (yellow card) 77'; Soto (yellow card) 90+2'	Stadium: Southwest University Park; Attendance: 5,007; Referee: Kevin Broadley

October 24, 2021 31	El Paso Locomotive FC	4-0	OKC Energy FC	El Paso, TX
	Gómez 40', 44'; King 42', 45+3' (yellow card) 45+4'; Bahner (yellow card) 57'	Report		Stadium: Southwest University Park; Attendance: 8,011; Referee: Benjamin Meyer

October 30, 2021 32	Rio Grande Valley FC Toros	4-1	El Paso Locomotive FC	Edinburg, TX
	López 7' (pen.); Ycaza (yellow card) 12' (goal) 80'; Azócar (yellow card) 45+2'; Edwards 45+4', 59' (yellow card) 45+4'; Vera (yellow card) 90+1'	Report	Borelli (yellow card) 45'; Herrera 52'	Stadium: H-E-B Park; Attendance: 4,440; Referee: John Griggs

==== USL Championship Playoffs ====
November 5, 2021 Conf. Quarterfinals	El Paso Locomotive FC	0-1	Oakland Roots SC	El Paso, TX
	Andrew Fox (footballer) (yellow card) 20'; Luna (yellow card) 78'	Report	Nane (yellow card) 26'; Bokila 76'; Morad (yellow card) 90+3'	Stadium: Southwest University Park; Attendance: 7,201; Referee: Ismir Pekmic

=== U.S. Open Cup ===
The 2021 U.S. Open Cup was cancelled due to COVID-19.
