= Egiluz =

Egiluz is a Spanish surname. Notable people with the surname include:

- Agurtzane Egiluz (born 1997), Spanish athlete who competes in wheelchair basketball
- Ander Egiluz (born 1998), Spanish professional soccer player
- Unai Egiluz (born 2002), Spanish footballer
