= Erik McCue =

Swedish footballer (born 2001)

Personal information
- Date of birth: 18 January 2001 (age 25)
- Place of birth: Gothenburg, Sweden
- Height: 1.91 m (6 ft 3 in)
- Position: Defender

Team information
- Current team: Örebro
- Number: 4

Youth career
- F.C. Bangkok
- 2015–2017: D.C. United
- 2017–2018: Houston Dynamo

Senior career*
Years	Team	Apps	(Gls)
2018	Brazos Valley Cavalry	0	(0)
2019–2021	Houston Dynamo	0	(0)
2019–2020	→ Rio Grande Valley FC (loan)	7	(0)
2021	→ Charleston Battery (loan)	15	(1)
2022	AB Argir	23	(1)
2023	El Paso Locomotive	29	(1)
2024–	Örebro	44	(2)
- * Club domestic league appearances and goals as of November 12, 2026

Erik McCue (born 18 January 2001) is a Swedish professional footballer who plays as a centre back for Örebro.

== Club career ==
=== Youth ===
McCue spent time in the youth setups for F.C. Bangkok and D.C. United before joining the Houston Dynamo academy in 2017. Upon joining the Dynamo academy, McCue quickly established himself in the program, helping lead the U-17 team to the U.S. Soccer Development Academy playoffs for the 2017–18 season and was named U-17 MVP by the coaching staff. He also received the Ricardo Clark Leadership Award for exhibiting "the strongest leadership qualities during the season, regardless of age group." McCue moved up to the U-19 team for the 2018–19 season and wore the captain's armband on multiple occasions. During the summer of 2018, McCue trained with the Dynamo's USL affiliate club Rio Grande Valley FC as well as with the Dynamo first team. He also spent time training with the Dynamo's PDL team, Brazos Valley Cavalry F.C., but did not feature in a game.

=== Houston Dynamo ===
On 30 October 2018 the Dynamo signed McCue to a Homegrown Player contract ahead of their 2019 season. McCue is the 10th Dynamo academy product to sign a first team contract. He suffered a foot injury that forced him to miss the start of the 2019 MLS season. McCue was sent on loan to the Dynamo's USL Championship affiliate Rio Grande Valley FC and made his professional debut on 29 March 2019 in a 2–1 loss to the Tulsa Roughnecks. On 10 July McCue was selected to partake in the 2019 MLS Homegrown Game. In his first season as a professional, he made 3 appearances, all with RGVFC, and spent time training with both the Dynamo first team and the Toros.

2020 saw McCue return to Rio Grande Valley on loan, making 4 appearances in a shortened season due to the COVID-19 pandemic.

==== Charleston Battery (loan) ====
On 24 February 2021 McCue joined USL Championship club Charleston Battery on a season-long loan. He made his Battery debut on May 14, coming on as a substitute in a 3–0 loss to Charlotte Independence. McCue scored his first career goal on May 23 in a 2–2 draw against New York Red Bulls II. He ended the season with 15 appearances, 1 goal, and 1 assist as Charleston finished 6th in the Atlantic Division, missing out on the playoffs.

Following the 2021 season, McCue's contract option was declined by Houston.

=== AB Argir ===
On 18 February 2022, McCue signed with Betrideildin side AB Argir. He made 23 league appearances for the club.

=== El Paso Locomotive ===
On 9 November 2022, it was announced that McCue had signed for USL Championship club El Paso Locomotive ahead of their 2023 season. McCue was named the fan's choice for Defensive Player of the Year, leading Locomotive in clearances and blocks. On 1 November 2023, it was announced that McCue would not be returning for the 2024 season.

=== Örebro ===
On 21 December 2023, McCue signed with Örebro in Swedish Superettan.

== Personal life ==
McCue was born in Gothenburg, Sweden and grew up in Onsala, Sweden. He also lived in Bangkok, Thailand, Chengdu, China, Washington, D.C., as well as Houston, Texas as a child.

McCue is eligible to play for both Sweden and the United States at the international level.

== Career statistics ==
As of 14 October 2023

Club	Season	League			National Cup (Note: Includes Faroe Islands Cup and U.S. Open Cup)		Playoffs		Continental		Total	
Club	Season	Division	Apps	Goals	Apps	Goals	Apps	Goals	Apps	Goals	Apps	Goals
RIo Grande Valley FC (loan)	2019	USL Championship	3	0	—		—		—		3	0
RIo Grande Valley FC (loan)	2020	USL Championship	4	0	—		—		—		4	0
RIo Grande Valley FC (loan)	RGVFC Total		7	0	0	0	0	0	0	0	7	0
Charleston Battery (loan)	2021	USL Championship	15	1	—		—		—		15	1
AB	2022	Faroe Islands Premier League	23	1	2	0	—		—		25	1
El Paso Locomotive FC	2023	USL Championship	28	1	1	0	—		—		29	1
Career Total			73	3	3	0	0	0	0	0	76	3
