= Diego Luna (soccer, born 2003) =

American soccer player (born 2003)

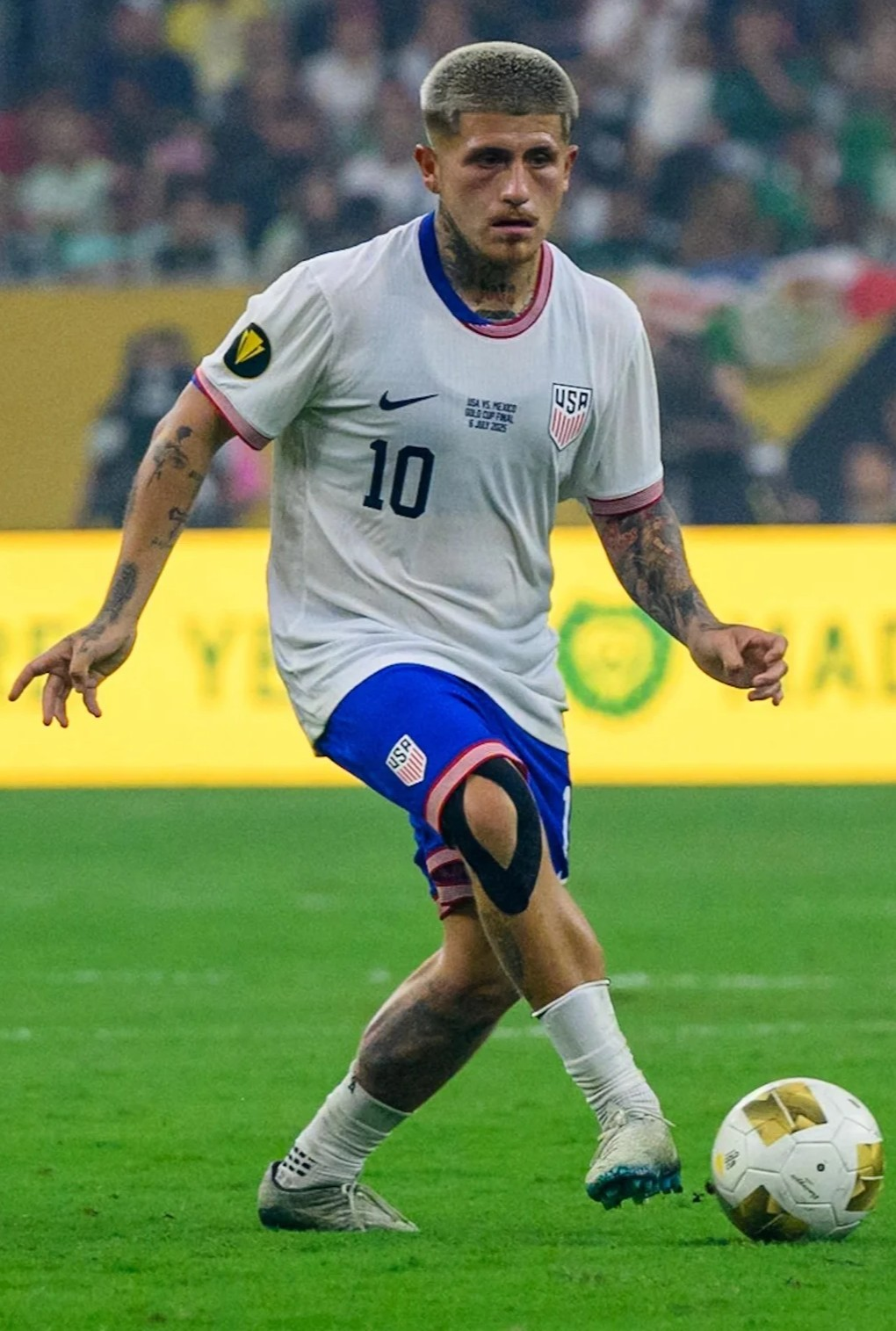
- Luna with the United States in 2025

Personal information
- Full name: Diego Angel Luna
- Date of birth: September 7, 2003 (age 23)
- Place of birth: Sunnyvale, California, US
- Height: 5 ft 8 in (1.73 m)
- Positions: Attacking midfielder; winger

Team information
- Current team: Real Salt Lake
- Number: 10

Youth career
- 2008–2015: Palo Alto SC
- 2015–2018: San Jose Earthquakes
- 2018–2021: Barça Residency Academy

Senior career*
Years	Team	Apps	(Gls)
2021–2022	El Paso Locomotive	41	(13)
2022	Real Monarchs	3	(2)
2022–	Real Salt Lake	112	(27)

International career^{‡}
2021–2023	United States U20	21	(5)
2024	United States U23	1	(0)
2024–	United States	18	(4)
Medal record
Representing United States
Men's football
CONCACAF Gold Cup
Runner-up	2025 Canada–United States
- * Club domestic league appearances and goals as of September 9, 2026 ‡ National team caps and goals as of November 18, 2025

Diego Angel Luna (born September 7, 2003) is an American professional soccer player who plays as an attacking midfielder or winger for Major League Soccer club Real Salt Lake and the United States national team.

== Early life ==
Luna was born in Sunnyvale, California, to Mexican parents from the state of Michoacan. Luna began playing organized soccer at age 5 with the Palo Alto Soccer Club.

== Club career ==
Luna joined the youth setup at Major League Soccer club San Jose Earthquakes in 2015. With the Earthquakes, Luna participated in various tournaments, including the Dallas Cup and Generation Adidas Cup. In 2018, Luna left the Earthquakes academy and joined the Barcelona Residency Academy, the Arizona-based academy for Spanish club Barcelona.

=== El Paso Locomotive ===
On April 5, 2021, Luna signed a professional contract with USL Championship club El Paso Locomotive. He made his debut for the club on May 8 in their season opening 1–1 draw against New Mexico United. He came on as a 78th-minute substitute for Richie Ryan. Following the match, as well as the second against Rio Grande Valley Toros, Locomotive head coach Mark Lowry said, "He has the mentality to go to the very top and we’re gonna help him do that."

Luna scored his first professional goal for El Paso on June 3, the winning goal in a 1–0 road victory over Austin Bold. He headed in a crossed ball from Macauley King in the 56th minute to give his side all three points.

=== Real Salt Lake ===
On June 2, 2022, Luna transferred to Real Salt Lake in a USL record deal of $250,000. He made his debut as an 88th-minute substitute against Vancouver Whitecaps. As of August 2026 he has scored a total of 27 goals for Real Salt Lake.

== International career ==
Luna has received call-ups to camps with the US under-14, under-17, and under-20 youth national teams. In 2022, he featured prominently with the US U20 team that won the CONCACAF U-20 Championship, securing berths for the 2023 FIFA U-20 World Cup and the 2024 Olympics in the process.

Luna earned his first selection to the senior national team in January 2024.

After declining to join as an alternate for the US Olympic team that was set to participate in the 2024 Summer Olympics in Paris, Luna confirmed on July 23, 2024, that he had not ruled out filing a one-time switch to FIFA switching his allegiance with Mexico's Mexican Football Federation.

On January 6, 2025, Luna was called up by Mauricio Pochettino for training camp and friendlies against Venezuela and Costa Rica. During the first half of the match against Costa Rica, Luna was elbowed in the face by a Costa Rican player and had his nose broken, but despite this Luna returned to the field to play through until halftime after having cotton shoved up his nostrils and changing to a fresh jersey after the previous had been bloodied. Luna provided an assist to Brian White's opening goal before going to the hospital for treatment after halftime, and in an interview following the end of the match which the United States won 3–0, Pochettino praised Luna's character and said that he had "big balls".

On June 5, Luna was selected by Pochettino to represent the United States in the 2025 CONCACAF Gold Cup, He scored his first international goal for the senior team on June 29 when he scored the first goal of a 2–2 draw against Costa Rica in the quarter-finals, helping the United States to the penalty shoot-out which they won 4–3. On July 2, USMNT defeated Guatemala 2–1, with Luna scoring in the 4th and 15th minutes to mark his first international brace. The USMNT would go on to lose 2–1 in the final against Mexico.

== Career statistics ==
=== Club ===
As of match played September 9, 2026

Appearances and goals by club, season and competition
Club	Season	League			National cup		Playoffs		Continental		Other		Total	
Club	Season	Division	Apps	Goals	Apps	Goals	Apps	Goals	Apps	Goals	Apps	Goals	Apps	Goals
El Paso Locomotive	2021	USL	31	9	—		1	0	—		—		32	9
El Paso Locomotive	2022	USL	10	4	1	0	—		—		—		11	4
El Paso Locomotive	Total		41	13	1	0	1	0	—		—		43	13
Real Monarchs	2022	MLS Next Pro	3	2	—		—		—		—		3	2
Real Salt Lake	2022	MLS	13	0	—		—		—		—		13	0
Real Salt Lake	2023	MLS	23	5	2	0	3	2	—		4 (Note: Appearances in Leagues Cup)	0	32	7
Real Salt Lake	2024	MLS	31	8	1	1	2	0	—		2	0	36	9
Real Salt Lake	2025	MLS	27	9	—		1	0	1 (Note: Appearance in CONCACAF Champions Cup)	0	3	1	32	10
Real Salt Lake	2026	MLS	18	5	—		0	0	—		4	0	22	5
Real Salt Lake	Total		112	27	3	1	6	2	1	0	13	1	135	31
Career total			156	42	4	1	7	2	1	0	13	1	181	46

=== International ===
As of match played November 18, 2025

Appearances and goals by national team and year
National team	Year	Apps	Goals
United States	2024	1	0
United States	2025	17	4
Total		18	4

Scores and results list United States goal tally first.

List of international goals scored by Diego Luna
No.	Date	Venue	Opponent	Score	Result	Competition
1	June 29, 2025	U.S. Bank Stadium, Minneapolis, United States	Costa Rica	1–1	2–2 (4–3 p)	2025 CONCACAF Gold Cup
2	July 2, 2025	Energizer Park, St. Louis, United States	Guatemala	1–0	2–1	2025 CONCACAF Gold Cup
3	July 2, 2025	Energizer Park, St. Louis, United States	Guatemala	2–0	2–1	2025 CONCACAF Gold Cup
4	November 18, 2025	Raymond James Stadium, Tampa, United States	Uruguay	4–0	5–1	Friendly

== Honors ==
United States U20

- CONCACAF U-20 Championship: 2022

Individual

- Revelations Cup Top Scorer: 2022 (shared)
- MLS Young Player of the Year: 2024
- MLS All-Star: 2024, 2025
- CONCACAF Gold Cup Best XI: 2025
