= Petar Petrović (footballer, born 1995) =

Swedish footballer

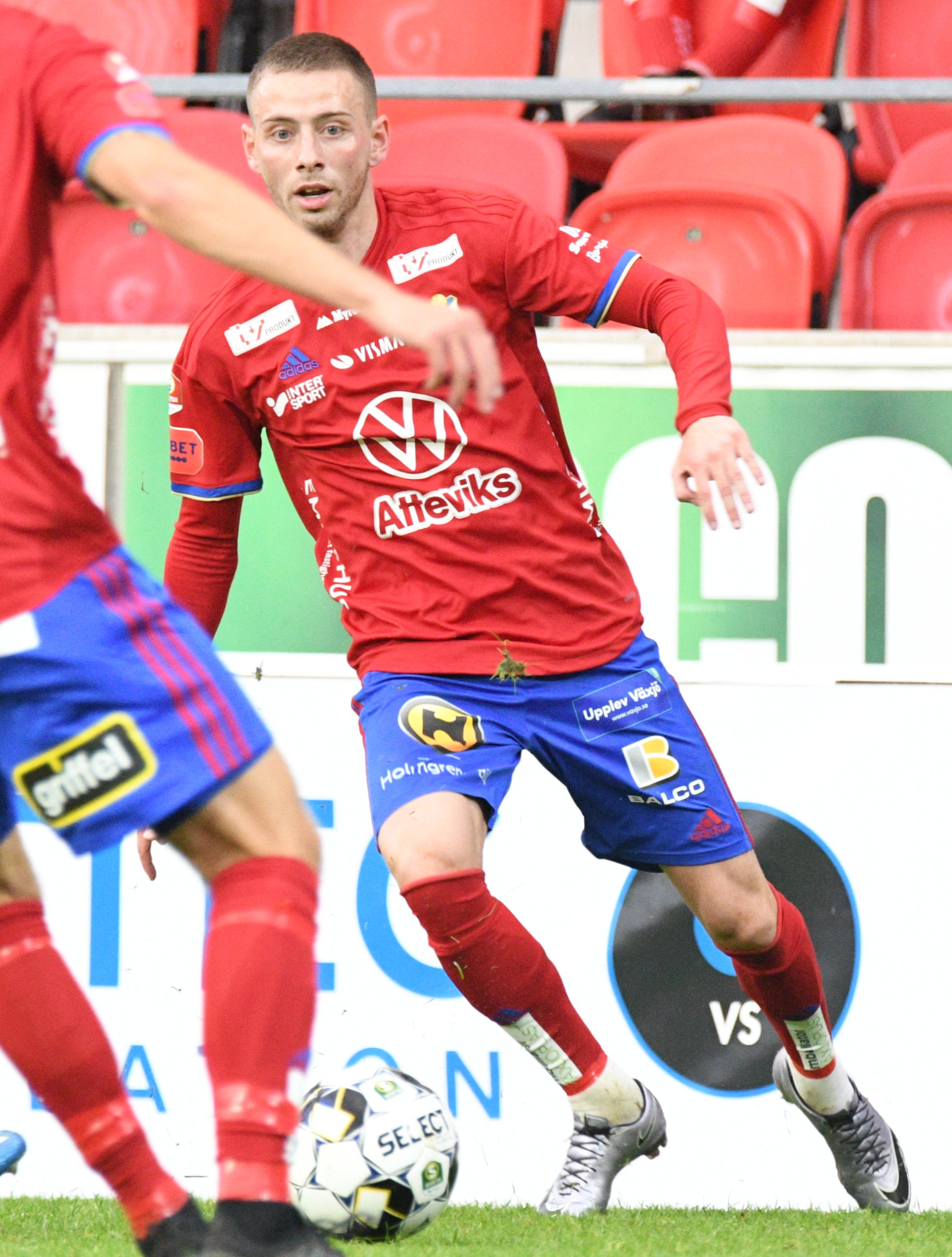

Personal information
- Full name: Petar Petrović
- Date of birth: 15 September 1995 (age 31)
- Place of birth: Malmö, Sweden
- Height: 1.79 m (5 ft 10 in)
- Position: Left midfielder

Team information
- Current team: AFC Malmö
- Number: 37

Youth career
- –2010: Arlövs BI
- 2010–2013: Malmö FF

Senior career*
Years	Team	Apps	(Gls)
2013–2015	Malmö FF	4	(0)
2014	→ Radnički Niš (loan)	11	(0)
2015	→ Värnamo (loan)	13	(0)
2016	Ängelholm	29	(1)
2017	Värnamo	26	(6)
2018	Brommapojkarna	13	(1)
2019	Radnički Niš	11	(2)
2019	Västerås SK	9	(0)
2020	Öster	25	(8)
2021–2022	Trelleborg	25	(8)
2023–2024	El Paso Locomotive	30	(7)
2024	Öster	5	(0)
2025	Bangkok	9	(2)
2025	Radnički Niš	2	(0)
2026–	AFC Malmö	18	(2)

International career
2011	Serbia U17	2	(1)
2012	Sweden U17	3	(0)
2013–2014	Sweden U19	4	(0)
- * Club domestic league appearances and goals as of 16 November 2026

Petar Petrović (born 15 September 1995) is a Swedish footballer who plays as a left midfielder for AFC Malmö.

== Early life ==
Petrović was born in Malmö, and is of Serb ethnic descent. His origin is from Niš.

== Career ==
=== Club career ===
On 30 November 2012 Petrović signed a first team contract on a youth basis with Malmö FF. Petrović made his Allsvenskan debut for Malmö FF in an away fixture against Syrianska FC at Södertälje Fotbollsarena on 20 June 2013. On 24 March 2014 Petrović signed a new four year first team contract with the club. On 24 July 2014 he was sent on loan to Serbian side Radnički Niš for the duration of the 2014 season. Petrović was again sent on a loan spell for the first half of the 2015 season, this time to Superettan side IFK Värnamo.

=== Radnički Niš ===
In winter 2018, he returns to FK Radnički Niš for the second time. The lunar item for his decision to come to Radnički was patriotism, because he originated from Niš.

=== Östers IF ===
On 2 December 2019, Östers IF confirmed the signing of Petrović on a deal for the 2020 season.

=== El Paso Locomotive ===
On 12 January 2023, Petrović signed with USL Championship side El Paso Locomotive. Petrović led Locomotive in goal contributions in 2023 with 7 goals and 4 assists, and on 1 November 2023, the club announced that he had signed a contract extension to keep him in El Paso through the 2024 season.

== Career statistics ==
As of 12 July 2024.

Club	Season	League			Cup (Note: Includes Svenska Cupen) (Note: Includes Serbian Cup) (Note: Includes U.S. Open Cup)		Continental		Other		Total	
Club	Season	Division	Apps	Goals	Apps	Goals	Apps	Goals	Apps	Goals	Apps	Goals
Malmö FF	2013	Allsvenskan	4	0	0	0	2 (Note: Appearances in Europa League qualifying)	0	—		6	0
Malmö FF	2014	Allsvenskan	0	0	1	0	0	0	—		1	0
Malmö FF	Total		4	0	1	0	2	0	0	0	7	0
Radnički Niš (loan)	2014–15	Serbian SuperLiga	11	0	1	0	—		—		12	0
Värnamo (loan)	2015	Superettan	13	0	0	0	—		—		13	0
Ängelholm	2016	Superettan	29	1	1	1	—		—		30	2
Värnamo	2017	Superettan	26	6	2	0	—		—		28	2
Brommapojkarna	2018	Allsvenskan	13	1	1	1	—		2 (Note: Appearances in the Allsvenskan/Superettan play-offs)	0	16	2
Radnički Niš	2018–19	Serbian SuperLiga	11	2	3	0	—		—		14	2
Västerås SK	2019	Superettan	9	0	1	0	—		0	0	10	0
Öster	2020	Superettan	25	8	0	0	—		0	0	25	0
Trelleborg	2021	Superettan	22	8	2	1	—		0	0	24	9
Trelleborg	2022	Superettan	3	0	0	0	—		0	0	3	0
Trelleborg	Total		25	8	2	1	0	0	0	0	27	9
El Paso Locomotive	2023	USL Championship	24	7	1	0	—		0	0	25	7
El Paso Locomotive	2024	USL Championship	5	0	0	0	—		0	0	5	0
El Paso Locomotive	Total		29	7	1	0	0	0	0	0	30	7
Career total			195	33	13	3	2	0	2	0	212	36
