= Dylan Mares =

American soccer player (born 1992)

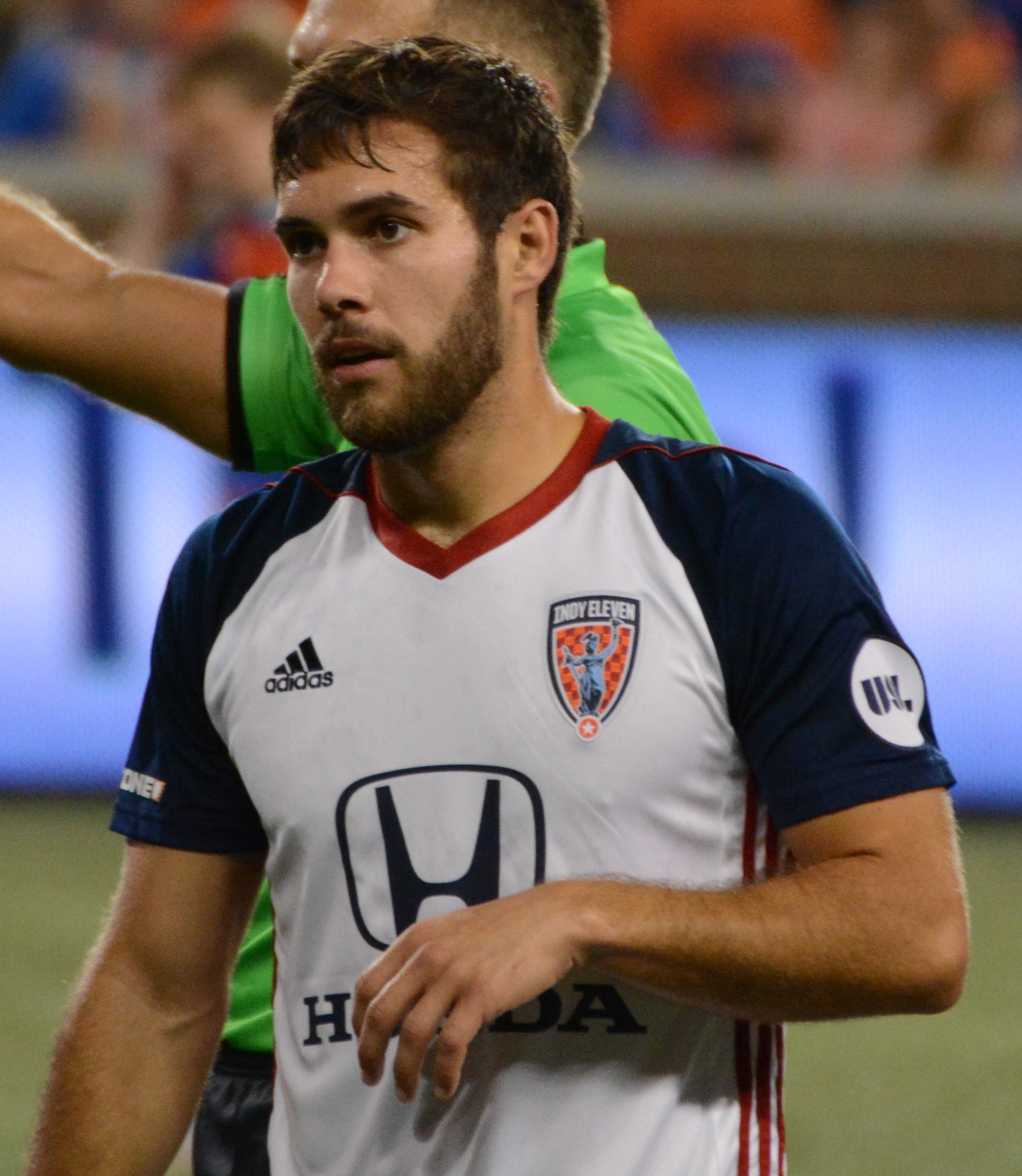
- Mares with Indy Eleven in 2018

Personal information
- Full name: Dylan A. Mares
- Date of birth: February 11, 1992 (age 34)
- Place of birth: Three Rivers, Michigan, United States
- Height: 1.75 m (5 ft 9 in)
- Position: Attacking midfielder

Youth career
- 2008–2010: Indiana Fire

College career
Years	Team	Apps	(Gls)
2010–2012	Louisville Cardinals	41	(15)
2013	Indiana Hoosiers	22	(3)

Senior career*
Years	Team	Apps	(Gls)
2012	Chicago Fire U-23	3	(0)
2014–2016	Indy Eleven	73	(10)
2017	Miami FC	29	(8)
2018	Miami FC 2	11	(2)
2018	Indy Eleven	11	(2)
2019	Miami FC	16	(11)
2020–2022	El Paso Locomotive	73	(18)
2023–2024	Louisville City	42	(6)
- * Club domestic league appearances and goals as of November 7, 2024

Dylan Mares (born February 11, 1992) is an American professional soccer player who plays as an attacking midfielder.

== Career ==
=== Early career ===
From Zionsville, Indiana, played youth soccer with the Indiana Fire Academy from 2008 to 2010. Mares and A. J. Corrado led Zionsville Community High School to a 2009 IHSAA state championship in soccer. He then started his collegiate career at the University of Louisville where he played college soccer for the Louisville Cardinals from 2010 to 2012. Despite missing the entire 2011 season due to a knee injury, Mares still managed to rank up 15 goals in his two seasons for the Cardinals. He then transferred to Indiana University to play for the Indiana Hoosiers. He played in 22 matches in his lone season for the Hoosiers, scoring three goals. After his first season Mares decided to join the selection pool for the 2014 MLS SuperDraft. However, Mares was not selected in any of the four rounds. Mares then joined the pre-season camp of MLS side Real Salt Lake but did not earn a contract with the side.

=== Indy Eleven ===
In March 2014 it was reported that Mares had started to trial with the Indy Eleven, a new expansion franchise in the North American Soccer League. Before the season began it was confirmed that Mares had signed for the Indy Eleven. He then made his professional debut during Indy Eleven's very first match in their history against the Carolina Railhawks on April 12, 2014, at the Michael Carroll Stadium. Mares came on as an 84th-minute substitute for Corby Moore as Indy Eleven drew the match 1–1.

=== The Miami FC ===
On January 16, 2017, Mares signed with NASL side Miami FC.

=== El Paso Locomotive ===
Mares signed with El Paso Locomotive FC on March 2, 2020. He played 77 games for the club, scoring 19 goals and assisting another 17, before departing the club following the 2022 season.

=== Louisville City ===
On December 27, 2022, it was announced that Mares would join Louisville City for their 2023 USL Championship season. His contract with Louisville expired following the 2024 season.

== Career statistics ==
=== Club ===
As of match played March 1, 2024

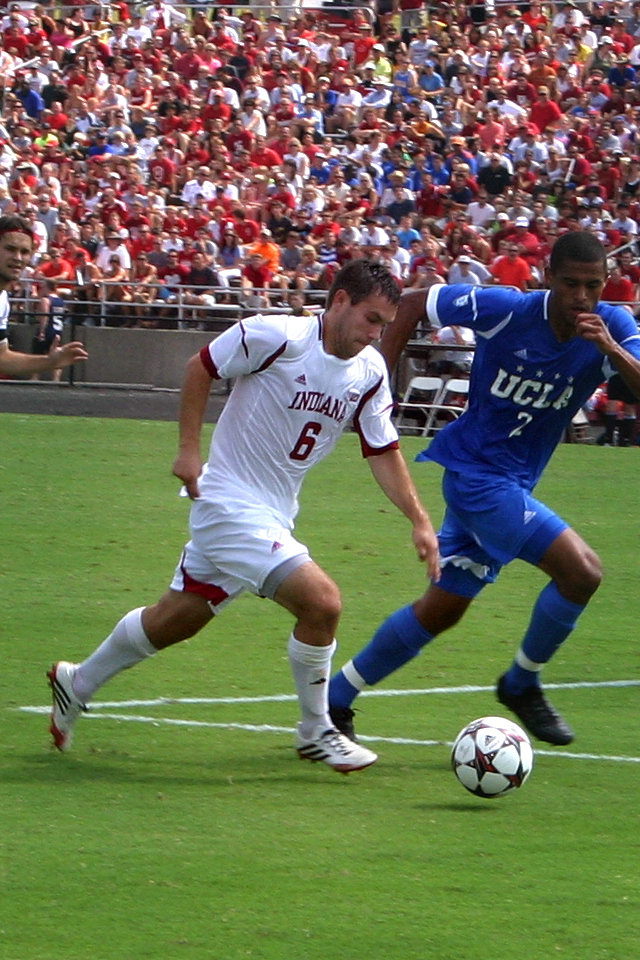
Mares playing for the Indiana Hoosiers in 2013

Appearances and goals by club, season and competition
Club	Season	League			Playoffs		Cup		Continental		Total	
Club	Season	Division	Apps	Goals	Apps	Goals	Apps	Goals	Apps	Goals	Apps	Goals
Indy Eleven	2014	NASL	24	0	–		2	1	–		26	1
Indy Eleven	2015	NASL	21	5	–		1	0	–		22	5
Indy Eleven	2016	NASL	28	5	2	0	2	0	–		32	5
Indy Eleven	Total		73	10	2	0	5	0	–		82	11
Miami FC	2017	NASL	29	8	1	0	5	0	–		35	8
Miami FC	Toal		29	8	1	0	5	0	–		35	8
Miami FC 2	2018	NPSL	11	2	5	2	3	2	–		19	6
Miami FC 2	Total		11	2	5	2	3	2	–		19	6
Indy Eleven	2018	USL	11	2	1	0	0	0	–		12	2
Indy Eleven	Total		11	2	1	0	0	0	–		12	2
Miami FC	2019	NPSL	10	6	5	2	1	0	–		16	8
Miami FC	2019	NISA	6	5	1	0	–		–		7	5
Miami FC	Total		16	11	6	2	1	0	–		23	13
El Paso Locomotive FC	2020	USL	16	4	3	1	–		–		19	5
El Paso Locomotive FC	2021	USL	27	4	1	0	–		–		28	4
El Paso Locomotive FC	2022	USL	29	10	1	0	–		–		30	10
El Paso Locomotive FC	Total		72	18	4	1	–		–		77	19
Louisville City FC	2023	USL	25	5	2	0	2	0	–		27	5
Career total			237	56	21	5	16	3	0	0	275	64
