= Martín Payares =

Colombian footballer (born 1995)

Personal information
- Full name: Martín Enrique Payares Campo
- Date of birth: 27 March 1995 (age 31)
- Place of birth: Majagual, Colombia
- Height: 1.83 m (6 ft 0 in)
- Position: Defender

Team information
- Current team: Deportes Quindío
- Number: 22

Youth career
- –2014: Cortuluá

Senior career*
Years	Team	Apps	(Gls)
2014–2016	Cortuluá	28	(2)
2016–2018	Orsomarso	62	(5)
2018	Deportivo Pasto	9	(0)
2019–2020	Santa Fe	0	(0)
2019–2020	→ Patriotas (loan)	27	(1)
2020–2021	Atlético Bucaramanga	12	(0)
2022	El Paso Locomotive	6	(0)
2023	Tigres	16	(0)
2023–2024	Internacional Bogotá	51	(2)
2025	Unión Magdalena	19	(1)
2025	Nacional Potosí	6	(0)
2026–	Deportes Quindío		
- * Club domestic league appearances and goals as of 16 August 2026

Martín Enrique Payares Campo (born 27 March 1995) is a Colombian football player who plays as defender for Deportes Quindío in the Categoría Primera B.

== Career ==
Payares played with various clubs in his native Colombia between 2014 and 2021, including Cortuluá, Orsomarso, Deportivo Pasto, Santa Fe, Patriotas and Atlético Bucaramanga.

On 21 December 2021, it was announced that Payares had joined USL Championship side El Paso Locomotive for their 2022 season.

He later returned to Colombian football with Tigres and Internacional Bogotá, before joining Unión Magdalena for the 2025 season. On 4 July 2025, Payares moved abroad again, signing with Bolivian club Nacional Potosí of the FBF División Profesional.

On 1 January 2026, Payares returned to Colombia as a free agent, joining Categoría Primera B club Deportes Quindío.
