= Nick Hinds =

American professional soccer player (born 1997)

Personal information
- Full name: Nicholas Hinds
- Date of birth: October 15, 1997 (age 29)
- Place of birth: Mandeville, Jamaica
- Height: 1.78 m (5 ft 10 in)
- Position: Left-back

Youth career
- 2002–2014: Plantation FC
- 2014–2015: Kendall SC
- 2015–2016: Seattle Sounders FC

College career
Years	Team	Apps	(Gls)
2016–2017	Akron Zips	44	(11)

Senior career*
Years	Team	Apps	(Gls)
2015–2016	Seattle Sounders FC 2	8	(0)
2018–2020	Tacoma Defiance	60	(1)
2021	Nashville SC	1	(0)
2021	→ Austin Bold (loan)	25	(1)
2022–2024	El Paso Locomotive	78	(2)

International career^{‡}
2015	United States U20	2	(0)
- * Club domestic league appearances and goals as of November 2, 2024 ‡ National team caps and goals as of September 15, 2015

Nicholas Hinds (born October 15, 1997) is an American professional soccer player who plays as a left-back.

== Career ==
=== Youth ===
Hinds began his youth career with Plantation FC and Kendell SC before joining the Seattle Sounders FC Academy in 2015. On October 22, 2014, Hinds verbally committed to the University of North Carolina.

=== Club ===
On August 28, 2015, he made his professional debut for USL club Seattle Sounders FC 2 in a 2–1 defeat to Real Monarchs.

Despite appearing for S2, Hinds was still able to maintain his college eligibility. On February 3, 2016, it was announced that he signed a letter of intent to play college soccer at the University of Akron.

=== Nashville SC ===
On February 22, 2021, Hinds signed with Major League Soccer club Nashville SC, after the team acquired his homegrown player rights from the Seattle Sounders FC.

On May 6, 2021, Hinds was loaned to USL Championship side Austin Bold, alongside Nashville SC teammate Elliot Panicco.

Following the 2021 season, Hinds' contract option was declined by Nashville and he became a free agent.

On January 18, 2022, Hinds signed with USL Championship side El Paso Locomotive.

=== International ===
Born in Jamaica, but raised in Florida, Hinds is eligible to play internationally for Jamaica or the United States at the senior international level.
