= Miles Lyons =

American soccer player (born 2002)

Personal information
- Date of birth: October 8, 2002 (age 24)
- Place of birth: Tucson, Arizona, United States
- Height: 1.73 m (5 ft 8 in)
- Position: Defender

Team information
- Current team: Charlotte Independence
- Number: 16

Youth career
- 2018–2021: Barça Residency Academy
- 2021: FC Tucson
- 2021–2022: Barça Residency Academy

Senior career*
Years	Team	Apps	(Gls)
2022–2024	El Paso Locomotive	61	(2)
2025	Monterey Bay FC	18	(0)
2026–	Charlotte Independence	23	(2)
- * Club domestic league appearances and goals as of October 31, 2026

Miles Lyons (born October 8, 2002) is an American professional soccer player who plays as a defender for Charlotte Independence in USL League One.

== Club career ==
=== Youth ===
Lyons, born in Tucson, Arizona, began playing with the Barça Residency Academy in 2018 after previously playing with local Tucson teams and ODP programs. In 2021, he spent time with USL League One side FC Tucson. In 2022, Lyons committed to playing college soccer at the University of Portland before switching to California State University, Fullerton.

=== El Paso Locomotive ===
On July 14, 2022, Lyons opted to not play college soccer, instead signing a professional contract with USL Championship side El Paso Locomotive. He made his professional debut on July 18, 2022, appearing as an 84th–minute substitute during a 4–0 loss to Oakland Roots.

=== Monterey Bay FC ===
Lyons signed Monterey Bay FC of the USL Championship on January 30, 2025. Lyons departed Monterey Bay after his contract option was not activated following the 2025 season.

=== Charlotte Independence ===
Lyons was announced as a signing for USL League One club Charlotte Independence on February 25, 2026.
