= Andrew Fox (footballer) =

English footballer

Personal information
- Full name: Andrew Thomas Philip Fox
- Date of birth: 15 January 1993 (age 33)
- Place of birth: Huntingdon, England
- Height: 1.80 m (5 ft 11 in)
- Position: Left back

College career
Years	Team	Apps	(Gls)
2011–2015	St. Edward's Hilltoppers	63	(36)

Senior career*
Years	Team	Apps	(Gls)
2015	Midland/Odessa Sockers	9	(3)
2015–2016	Peterborough United	18	(1)
2015	→ Kidderminster Harriers (loan)	6	(0)
2016–2017	Stevenage	9	(0)
2017	AFC Eskilstuna	13	(0)
2018–2019	Grimsby Town	22	(0)
2019–2022	El Paso Locomotive	86	(6)
2023–2024	Orange County SC	41	(0)
- * Club domestic league appearances and goals as of 4 September 2025

Andrew Thomas Philip Fox (born 15 January 1993) is an English professional footballer.

Fox played college soccer in the United States for St. Edward's University in Austin, Texas. After a short spell at Midland/Odessa Sockers, Fox moved back to England in July 2015, where he joined League One side Peterborough United on a free transfer. He joined National League side Kidderminster Harriers on loan in August 2015, less than one month later he returned to Peterborough. In June 2016, Fox signed for Stevenage in League Two. After being released, Fox spent a season in the Allsvenskan – Sweden's top tier with AFC Eskilstuna in August 2017. Having become a free agent, he signed for League Two side Grimsby Town until the end of season, having previously being on trial at the start of the season.

== College career ==
Fox studied at St. Edward's University in Austin, Texas, where he played for their soccer team and finished having scored 36 goals in 64 appearances.

== Club career ==
=== Midland/Odessa Sockers ===
Fox played for the Midland/Odessa Sockers for two months. In his nine matches with the Sockers, he tallied three goals and three assists in his role as a play-making midfielder. He then went back to England for a two-week trial with Peterborough in June 2015.

=== Peterborough United ===
On 20 June 2015, Fox was signed by League One side Peterborough United along with Irishman Kieran Sadlier and Ivorian Souleymane Coulibaly. His debut came on 24 October 2015 as a 67th minute substitution, on for Jermaine Anderson in a 4–0 win against Doncaster Rovers. He scored his first goal for the club on 16 April 2016 having only been on pitch two minutes in the 4–1 win at Colchester, a right footed shot from 8-yards to put them 2–0 up.

Fox was released by Peterborough at the end of the 2015–16 season after the expiry of his one-year contract.

==== Kidderminster Harriers (loan) ====
Fox joined Kidderminster on a month loan deal from Peterborough United on 18 August 2015. He started 6 games and returned to Peterborough a month later.

=== Stevenage ===
Fox joined League Two side Stevenage on a one-year deal in June 2016. After making 9 league appearances for Stevenage in the 2016–17 season he was released by the club on 12 May 2017.

=== AFC Eskilstuna ===
Fox joined Allsvenskan side AFC Eskilstuna for the remainder of the season in August 2017.

=== Grimsby Town ===
Fox had been a free agent after the season ended in Sweden, he joined EFL League Two side Grimsby Town on 9 March 2018 until the end of the season, he became Michael Jolley's first signing of his tenure. He had previously been on trial with the club under manager Russell Slade in July 2017. He was offered a new contract by Grimsby at the end of the 2017–18 season. Fox achieved infamy on 5 January 2019 when he became the first player in English football to receive a red card following a video assistant referee decision.

At the end of his contract, Fox moved to Texas, USA to be with his wife, having left the club at the end of January 2019.

=== El Paso Locomotive ===
On 4 February 2019, Fox joined USL Championship side El Paso Locomotive ahead of their inaugural season. He made 90 appearances for the club over four seasons before departing following the lackluster 2022 season.

=== Orange County SC ===
Fox signed a multi-year contract with Orange County SC on 14 December 2022.

== Career statistics ==
As of match played on 10 March 2018

Appearances and goals by club, season and competition
Club	Season	League			FA Cup		League Cup		Other		Total	
Club	Season	Division	Apps	Goals	Apps	Goals	Apps	Goals	Apps	Goals	Apps	Goals
Midland/Odessa Sockers	2015	National Premier Soccer League	9	3	0	0	0	0	0	0	9	3
Peterborough United	2015–16	League One	18	1	4	0	0	0	0	0	22	1
Kidderminster Harriers (loan)	2015–16	National League	6	0	—		—		0	0	6	0
Stevenage	2016–17	League Two	9	0	0	0	3	0	2 (Note: Appearances in EFL Trophy)	0	14	0
AFC Eskilstuna	2017	Allsvenskan	13	0	—		—		1 (Note: Appearances in Svenska Cupen)	0	14	0
Grimsby Town	2017–18	League Two	10	0	—		—		0	0	1	0
Career total			65	4	4	0	3	0	3	0	66	4
