= Yuma (footballer) =

Spanish footballer

Personal information
- Full name: Javier Monsálvez Carazo
- Date of birth: 8 October 1985 (age 41)
- Place of birth: Madrid, Spain
- Height: 1.77 m (5 ft 9 1/2 in)
- Position: Central midfielder

Youth career
- 1994–2004: Rayo Vallecano

Senior career*
Years	Team	Apps	(Gls)
2004–2005	Rayo Vallecano B		
2005–2011	Rayo Vallecano	62	(1)
2005–2006	→ Fuenlabrada (loan)	31	(0)
2011–2012	Salamanca	24	(0)
2012–2013	Ontinyent	27	(0)
2013–2015	Puerta Bonita	53	(0)
2016	Rayo OKC	18	(0)
2017	Puerto Rico	19	(0)
2018	Jacksonville Armada	11	(1)
2019–2024	El Paso Locomotive	108	(0)
Total		353	(2)
- * Club domestic league appearances and goals

Javier Monsálvez Carazo (born 8 October 1985), commonly known as Yuma, is a Spanish former professional footballer who played as a central midfielder.

== Club career ==
Born in Madrid, Yuma finished his development with local Rayo Vallecano, making his senior debut with the reserves in 2004–05, in Tercera División. In the same season he also appeared with the main squad in the Segunda División B and, in summer 2005, he was loaned to CF Fuenlabrada also in that level.

Yuma returned to Rayo in 2006, but struggled to appear regularly for the side, only contributing 20 starts over two seasons and being promoted in the second. He made his professional debut on 25 October that year, playing the entire 1–1 home draw against RCD Espanyol in the round of 32 of the Copa del Rey. His maiden Segunda División appearance came nearly two years later, in a 2–1 win over Deportivo Alavés also at the Campo de Fútbol de Vallecas.

After featuring sparingly in the following two seasons (being restricted due to injuries), Yuma left the Franjirrojos in June 2011. He signed with UD Salamanca shortly after, returning to the third division.

Yuma continued to compete in the third tier subsequently, representing Ontinyent CF and CD Puerta Bonita. On 24 March 2016, the 30-year-old moved abroad for the first time in his career after agreeing to a contract with North American Soccer League club Rayo OKC.

On 30 January 2017, Yuma signed for Puerto Rico FC in the same country and division. The competition was put on hiatus at the end of the campaign, and in February 2018 he joined Jacksonville Armada FC who had moved to the National Premier Soccer League.

In December 2018, Yuma was one of three players who moved with coach Mark Lowry to new USL Championship team El Paso Locomotive FC. Ahead of the 2021 campaign, he was named their captain.

Yuma was retained for the 2023 season, aged 37. Both he and teammate Éder Borelli retired at the end of the following campaign.
