= Luis Solignac =

Argentine footballer

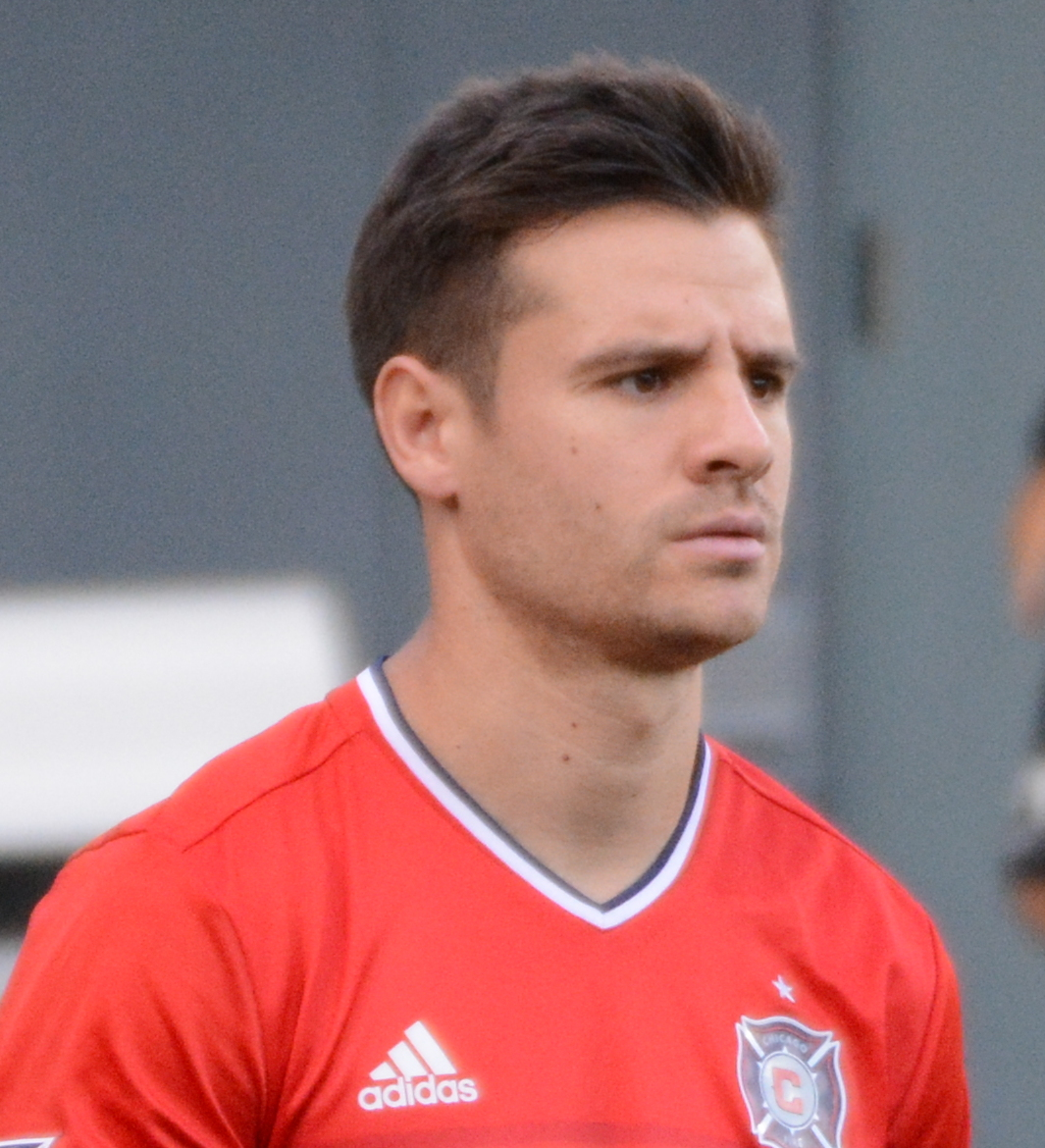
- Solignac with Chicago Fire in 2017

Personal information
- Full name: Luis Emilio Solignac
- Date of birth: 16 February 1991 (age 35)
- Place of birth: Buenos Aires, Argentina
- Height: 1.84 m (6 ft 0 in)
- Position: Forward

Youth career
- Platense

Senior career*
Years	Team	Apps	(Gls)
2008–2014	Platense	14	(4)
2009–2011	→ Braga (loan)	0	(0)
2012	→ Banfield (loan)	0	(0)
2013	→ Djurgården (loan)	14	(1)
2013–2014	→ IFK Mariehamn (loan)	41	(20)
2015	Nueva Chicago	10	(2)
2015–2016	Colorado Rapids	33	(3)
2016–2018	Chicago Fire	57	(9)
2020	San Antonio FC	16	(8)
2020	San Luis	2	(0)
2021–2023	El Paso Locomotive	80	(35)
2024	San Antonio FC	17	(6)
- * Club domestic league appearances and goals as of 21:05, 1 November 2024 (UTC)

Luis Emilio Solignac (born 16 February 1991) is an Argentine professional footballer who plays as a forward.

== Career ==
During the 2013 pre-season, he was signed on loan from Club Atlético Platense. Solignac made his Djurgårdens IF debut in Svenska Cupen on 3 March 2013, against Umeå FC. He scored his only league goal for Djurgården when he equalized to 2–2 home against Malmö FF on 12 May 2013.

=== IFK Mariehamn (loan) ===
He was loaned out to Finnish Veikkausliiga club IFK Mariehamn during 2013–2014, making 41 league appearances for the club and scoring 20 goals in total.

=== Colorado Rapids ===
Solignac signed for the Colorado Rapids of Major League Soccer (MLS) in May 2015.

=== Chicago Fire ===
Solignac was traded to a fellow MLS franchise Chicago Fire on 3 August 2016, in exchange for allocation money. He was immediately integrated into Chicago's starting lineup, playing his first full 90 minutes for the team just three days after his trade. He started in all but two of Chicago's remaining matches for the season. He only failed to see minutes in Chicago's final game of the season, due to a red card suspension he had received in the prior match after a trip off the ball.

In 2017, Solignac began the season with a career-high four goals and three assists through just the first 15 games, leading an MLSsoccer.com writer to credit him as a driving force behind Chicago's eight-game unbeaten streak. Solignac would remain a regular starter for the rest of the season.

Solignac started in the first two matches of Chicago's 2018 season, but suffered a quadriceps strain that forced him out of action for an estimated six to eight weeks. He made his return as a late substitute in a 30 May match against Philadelphia Union. He returned to his starting role for a few matches, but never to play a full 90 minutes, and he began to spend more matches on the bench than in previous years with Chicago. Solignac saw his first full 90 minutes of play time since the injury on 4 August in an away match against Real Salt Lake.

Solignac was released by Chicago at the end of their 2018 season.

=== San Antonio FC ===
On 31 January 2020, San Antonio FC announced that they had signed Solignac for the 2020 USL Championship season.

=== El Paso Locomotive FC ===
On 4 February 2021, El Paso Locomotive FC announced that they had signed Solignac for the 2021 USL Championship season. On 26 May 2021, Solignac set an El Paso Locomotive club record for fastest goal, scoring just 18 seconds into the match against Rio Grande Valley FC Toros. After a successful first season with the club, El Paso announced that they had re-signed Solignac for the 2022 season on 8 December 2021. On 16 August 2022, Solignac was named USL Championship player of the week for week 23 of the 2022 season, after scoring two goals and an assist against Colorado Springs Switchbacks FC.

== Career statistics ==
Appearances and goals by club, season and competition
Club	Season	League			Domestic cups (Note: Includes Svenska Cupen, Finnish Cup, Finnish League Cup, Copa Argentina, U.S. Open Cup and Copa Chile)		Continental		Total	
Club	Season	Division	Apps	Goals	Apps	Goals	Apps	Goals	Apps	Goals
Platense	2008-09	Primera B Nacional	12	2	0	0	—		12	2
Platense	2011–12	Primera B Metropolitana	2	2	—	—	—		2	2
Platense	Total		14	4	0	0	0	0	14	4
Djurgården (loan)	2013	Allsvenskan	14	1	5	1	—		19	2
IFK Mariehamn (loan)	2013	Veikkausliiga	9	6	1	0	—		10	6
IFK Mariehamn (loan)	2014	Veikkausliiga	32	14	8	5	—		40	19
IFK Mariehamn (loan)	Total		41	20	9	5	0	0	50	25
Nueva Chicago	2015	Primera División	10	2	0	0	—		10	2
Colorado Rapids	2015	MLS	15	0	1	0	—		16	0
Colorado Rapids	2016	MLS	18	3	2	0	—		20	3
Colorado Rapids	Total		33	3	3	0	0	0	36	3
Chicago Fire	2016	MLS	13	2	0	0	—		13	2
Chicago Fire	2017	MLS	34	7	2	1	—		26	8
Chicago Fire	2018	MLS	11	0	2	0	—		13	0
Chicago Fire	Total		58	9	4	1	0	0	62	10
San Antonio FC	2020	USL Championship	16	8	0	0	—		16	8
San Luis	2020	Primera B de Chile	2	0	0	0	—		2	0
El Paso Locomotive	2021	USL Championship	33	10	0	0	—		33	10
El Paso Locomotive	2022	USL Championship	26	16	1	0	—		27	16
El Paso Locomotive	2023	USL Championship	22	9	0	0	—		22	9
El Paso Locomotive	Total		81	35	1	0	0	0	82	35
San Antonio	2024	USL Championship	17	6	—		—		17	6
Career total			286	88	22	7	0	0	299	95
