= Ander Egiluz =

American soccer player

Personal information
- Full name: Ander Egiluz Alzola
- Date of birth: April 27, 1998 (age 28)
- Place of birth: Getxo, Spain
- Height: 1.82 m (6 ft 0 in)
- Positions: Defender; defensive midfielder

Youth career
- 2016–2017: Athletic Bilbao

Senior career*
Years	Team	Apps	(Gls)
2017–2019	Basconia	3	(0)
2018–2019	→ Leioa (loan)	25	(1)
2019–2020	Leioa	10	(0)
2020	Villarrobledo	8	(0)
2021	Haro Deportivo	14	(0)
2022–2023	El Paso Locomotive	21	(1)

International career
2016	United States U19	2	(0)
- * Club domestic league appearances and goals as of 19:27, August 27, 2023 (UTC)

Ander Egiluz Alzola (born April 27, 1998) is a professional soccer player who plays as a defensive midfielder and center back. Born in Spain, he has represented the United States at youth level.

== Club career ==
Egiluz joined the Athletic Bilbao academy in 2016, where he played through to the team's under-19 squad, before signing with Tercera División club CD Basconia in 2017. While with Basconia, Egiluz went on loan to SD Leioa in Spain's third division, Segunda División B, where he ultimately signed full time in 2019. After Leioa, Egiluz spent a short period with CP Villarrobledo where he made eight appearances before transferring to Haro Deportivo, playing in 13 matches.

On February 15, 2022, Egiluz moved to the United States, signing with USL Championship side El Paso Locomotive.

== International ==
Although born in the Basque Country in Spain, Egiluz chose to represent the United States at international level, for which he was eligible due to his mother being born in the state of Idaho. Egiluz made two appearances in the 2016 Slovakia Cup, which the team went on to win.
