= Aarón Gómez =

Mexican footballer (born 1994)

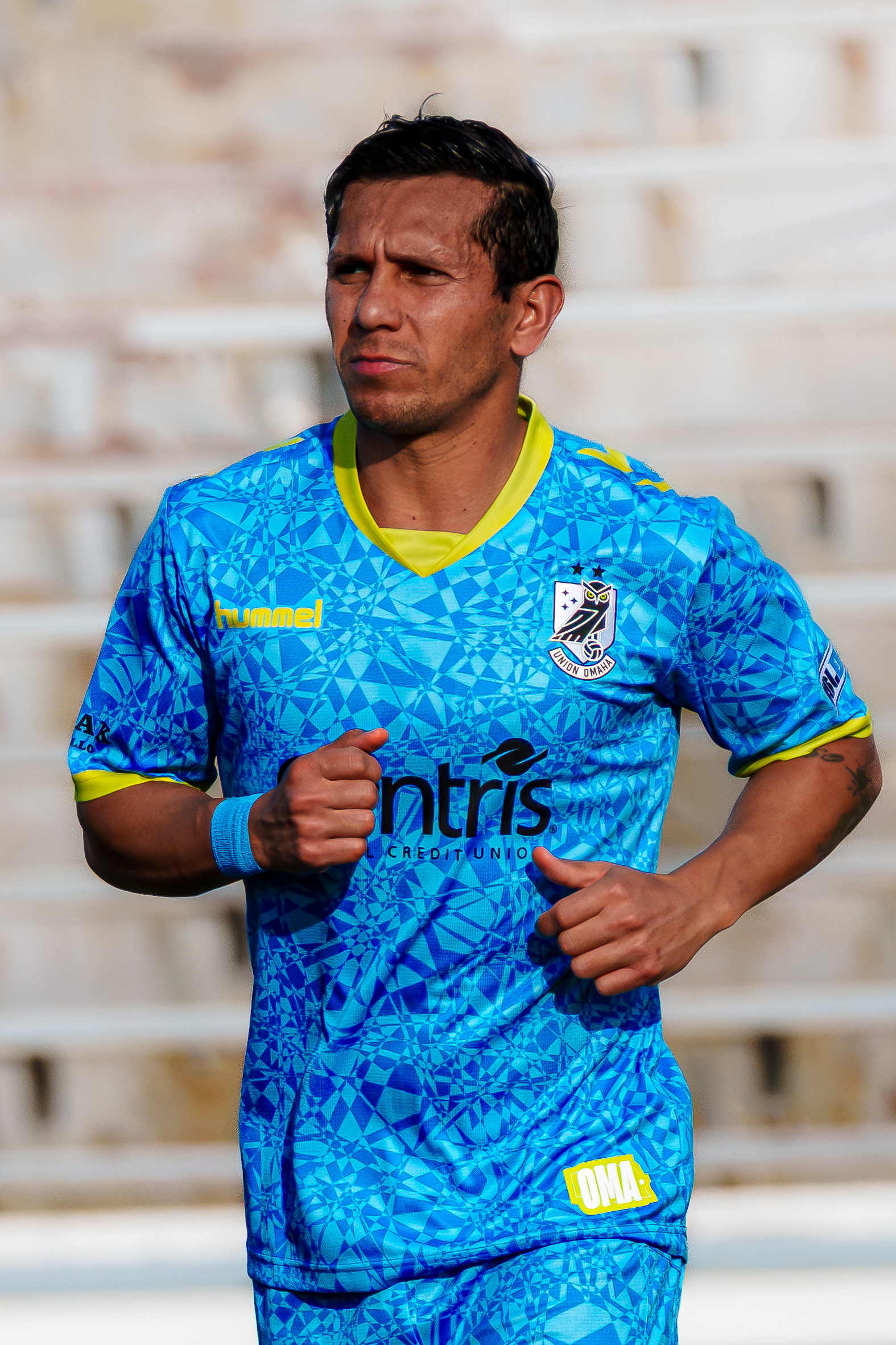
- Gomez with Union Omaha in 2026

Personal information
- Full name: Josué Aarón Gómez Gómez
- Date of birth: 24 August 1994 (age 32)
- Place of birth: Durango, Mexico
- Height: 1.75 m (5 ft 9 in)
- Position: Forward

Team information
- Current team: Union Omaha
- Number: 21

Youth career
- –2014: Titanes de Tulancingo
- 2014: Pachuca
- 2014–2015: UACJ
- 2015–2016: Potros UAEM

Senior career*
Years	Team	Apps	(Gls)
2016–2019	Juárez	38	(5)
2019–2023	El Paso Locomotive	132	(34)
2024–	Union Omaha	56	(10)
- * Club domestic league appearances and goals as of October 31, 2026

Josué Aarón Gómez Gómez (Note: In this Spanish name, the first or paternal surname is Gómez and the second or maternal family name is Gómez.) (born 24 August 1994) is a Mexican professional footballer who plays as a forward for Union Omaha in the USL League One.
