= Ricardo Zacarías =

American soccer player (born 1995)

Personal information
- Full name: Ricardo Zacarías Ortíz
- Date of birth: August 31, 1995 (age 31)
- Place of birth: Las Cruces, New Mexico, United States
- Height: 1.80 m (5 ft 11 in)
- Position: Forward

Senior career*
Years	Team	Apps	(Gls)
2015	Albuquerque Sol	12	(2)
2016–2018	Club América Premier	14	(2)
2018	Irapuato	8	(0)
2019	Coras de Nayarit	22	(2)
2020	La Piedad	7	(0)
2020	Chattanooga Red Wolves	14	(2)
2021–2024	El Paso Locomotive	88	(6)
- * Club domestic league appearances and goals as of 13:02, 3 November 2024 (UTC)

Ricardo Zacarías Ortíz (born August 31, 1995) is an American professional soccer player who plays as a forward.

== Career ==
Ricardo began his playing career at Yavapai and Trinidad State, eventually making an appearance in the NJCAA national tournament, placing third with Trinidad State in 2014.

Zacarías played a season in the USL PDL with his local side Albuquerque Sol in 2015.

Following a Sueno Alianza open tryout in Mexico in September 2015, where Zacarías competed with over 700 other players, Zacarías caught the attention of scouts in Liga MX. He was later invited back to attend another showcase in Miami, Florida. From this trial, he earned a contract with Liga MX powerhouse Club América.

Zacarías spent five years in Mexico, playing with Club América Premier, Irapuato, Coras de Nayarit and La Piedad.

On January 30, 2020, signed with USL League One side Chattanooga Red Wolves.

On May 19, 2021, Zacarías joined USL Championship side El Paso Locomotive.
