= Éder Borelli =

Mexican footballer (born 1990)

Personal information
- Full name: Éder Nicolás Borelli Cap
- Date of birth: 25 November 1990 (age 35)
- Place of birth: Monterrey, Nuevo León, Mexico
- Height: 1.68 m (5 ft 6 in)
- Position: Left-back

Senior career*
Years	Team	Apps	(Gls)
2010–2011	Querétaro	24	(1)
2011–2017	Tigres UANL	1	(0)
2013–2014	→ UAT (loan)	29	(2)
2014	→ Atlante (loan)	10	(0)
2015–2017	→ Juárez (loan)	53	(1)
2017–2020	Juárez	53	(2)
2020–2024	El Paso Locomotive	91	(2)

International career
2011	Mexico U20	1	(0)
2011	Mexico U23	2	(0)
- * Club domestic league appearances and goals as of 16:39, 25 October 2024 (UTC)

Éder Nicolás Borelli Cap (Note: In this Spanish name, the first or paternal surname is Borelli and the second or maternal family name is Cap.) (born 25 November 1990) is a Mexican former professional footballer who played as a left-back.

== Club career ==
Despite living many years in Argentina, he wanted to play in Mexico and it came true when he was signed by Liga MX club Querétaro.

After spending several seasons with Juárez, Borelli moved across the border to join USL Championship club El Paso Locomotive FC.

El Paso announced the retirement of Borelli and teammate Yuma on 17 October 2024, ahead of the pair's final match that weekend.

== Personal life ==
Borelli's father, Jorge, is an Argentina international former footballer of Italian descent who played for Tigres UANL when he has born. He is married to Gabriela Garza Lagüera with whom he has two children. His maternal grandfather Vladislao Cap was an Argentina international footballer of Polish descent.

== Honours ==
Tigres UANL

- Mexican Primera División: Apertura 2011
