= Macauley King =

English footballer

Personal information
- Date of birth: 4 October 1995 (age 31)
- Place of birth: Narborough, Leicestershire, England
- Height: 5 ft 11 in (1.80 m)
- Position: Defender

Team information
- Current team: Barwell

Youth career
- –2014: Leicester City

College career
| Years | Team | Apps | (Gls) |
| 2015–2018 | Young Harris Mountain Lions | 75 | (8) |

Senior career*
| Years | Team | Apps | (Gls) |
| 2014–2015 | Barwell | | |
| 2014 | → Heather St John's (loan) | | |
| 2015 | Mississippi Brilla | 12 | (0) |
| 2016 | Charlotte Eagles | 12 | (1) |
| 2017 | Seattle Sounders FC U-23 | 9 | (0) |
| 2019–2020 | Indy Eleven | 22 | (1) |
| 2020–2021 | El Paso Locomotive | 34 | (7) |
| 2022–2023 | Colorado Springs Switchbacks | 14 | (0) |
| 2023–2024 | Indy Eleven | 14 | (0) |
| 2024–2025 | Redditch United | 4 | (0) |
| 2025–2026 | Pershore Town | | |
| 2026– | Barwell | 0 | (0) |
- * Club domestic league appearances and goals as of 28 June 2026

Macauley King (born 4 October 1995) is an English footballer who plays as a defender for Northern Premier League Division One Midlands club Barwell.

== Career ==
While in college, he played in the Premier Development League with Mississippi Brilla, Charlotte Eagles, and Seattle Sounders FC U-23. On 7 January 2022, King moved to Colorado Springs Switchbacks. King rejoined Indy Eleven on 12 May 2023 in the midst of the 2023 USL Championship Season and departed the club following the 2024 season.

=== Barwell ===
On 28 June 2026, King re-joined Northern Premier League Division One Midlands side Barwell.
