= 2021 New Mexico United season =

New Mexico United
2021 season
- Head coach: Troy Lesesne
- Stadium: Rio Grande Credit Union Field at Isotopes Park; Albuquerque, New Mexico
- USL: 5th (Mountain Division)
- USL Cup Playoffs: DNQ
- Four Corners Cup: Cancelled
- Top goalscorer: Chris Wehan (10)
- Highest home attendance: 10,418 (8/14 v. ELP)
- Lowest home attendance: 5,593 (10/20 v. SAN)
- Average home league attendance: 7,863
- Biggest win: NM 3–1 ATX (May 15); COS 1–3 NM (May 21); NM 2–0 SAN (June 16); NM 3–1 COS (July 9); NM 4–2 SAN (October 20)
- Biggest defeat: SAN 3–0 NMU (July 21)
Home colours	Away colours	Third colours

The 2021 New Mexico United season was the third season for New Mexico United in the USL Championship, the second-tier professional soccer league in the United States. This article covers the period from November 1, 2020, the day after the cancellation of the 2020 USL playoff final, to the conclusion of the 2021 USL playoff final. The USL Championship 2021 season began on April 24, and New Mexico United played its first competitive match of the season on May 1.

== Season in review ==
=== Off-season and pre-season ===
The club concluded the 2020 season with a loss to El Paso Locomotive FC in the Western Conference semifinal. They ended the regular season in 2nd place in Group C.

Six players departed in November after the conclusion of play. Romeo Parkes returned to Sligo Rovers at the end of his loan. Chris Wehan and Saalih Muhammed transferred to Orange County SC and Oakland Roots SC, respectively. Ryan Williams and David Estrada announced their retirements from professional football, and Joris Ahlinvi was released at the end of his contract. December saw Ilija Ilić, Harry Swartz, and Sergio Rivas join from Indy Eleven, Hartford Athletic, and Reno 1868 FC, respectively.

In January 2021, the club announced the signings of Isidro Martinez from Rio Grande Valley FC Toros and semiprofessional defender Alex Touche. February saw two players depart the club, Ben Beaury and Sammy Sergi; and two new signings, Micheal Azira and Brian Brown.

In March, first-choice goalkeeper Cody Mizell announced he would be departing New Mexico United for a club in Major League Soccer, later revealed to be New York City FC. Later that month, on March 11 the club announced the signing of Alex Tambakis from North Carolina FC, where he had been first-choice for the prior three seasons.

=== May ===
New Mexico United began its competitive season away at Rio Grande Valley FC Toros on May 1, beginning the campaign with a 1–0 loss. One week later, Devon Sandoval scored the first goal of the season in an eventual 1–1 draw away at El Paso Locomotive FC. The club won its first competitive game of the season on May 15 against Austin Bold FC, in their first game at home since the end of the 2019 USL Championship season. Later that month, New Mexico United beat Colorado Springs Switchbacks FC 3–1, winning the first competitive match at the Switchbacks' new stadium. They ended the month with a 1–0 loss at home to Atlantic Division opponents Loudoun United FC, in which Austin Yearwood was sent off with a straight red card in the 23rd minute.

=== June ===
After an away win over Real Monarchs on June 4, the club played Austin Bold FC to a scoreless draw at home on June 12. The club announced contract extensions for both vice-captain Kalen Ryden and attacking midfielder Amando Moreno, both of whom signed deals through 2023. After beating San Antonio FC at home on June 16, the club ended the month with two away losses to Four Corners Cup teams in 5 days. Colorado Springs Switchbacks FC won 3–1 on June 25, and Real Monarchs won 3–2 on June 30.

=== July ===
New Mexico United lost their first game of the month 1–2 away at El Paso Locomotive FC on July 3. Despite leading in the first half, Dylan Mares scored two goals 105 seconds apart. This was the first time the club had lost 3 consecutive league matches. Returning home, on July 9 they beat Colorado Springs Switchbacks 3–1, with two goals after the end of regulation time. On July 12, they won a second consecutive match at home, beating Charleston Battery 2–1. Nine days later, they lost to San Antonio FC 3–0, making a streak of 7 matches in which the home side won. Returning home on July 24, the club played El Paso Locomotive FC to a scoreless draw. On July 28, the club announced the re-signing of Afghan international David Najem, who had left New Mexico United after making 13 appearances in the 2020 season.

=== August ===
On August 1, New Mexico United drew 0–0 away at Tacoma Defiance. Returning home on August 14, the club drew El Paso Locomotive FC 1–1. On August 17, the club announced the return of Chris Wehan, who had transferred to Orange County SC. Also on August 17, the Albuquerque City Council approved a ballot measure to finance construction of a soccer-specific stadium by gross tax receipt bonds. The measure will appear on the ballot of the 2021 Albuquerque mayoral election. The next day, the club announced the signing of trialist goalkeeper Will Palmquist, who had previously played for the University of Denver. On August 18, the club drew its fourth game in a row, playing Oakland Roots SC to a 1–1 result. The club finished the month with a draw away at Austin Bold FC and a 3–2 loss to Phoenix Rising FC.

=== September ===
New Mexico United began September with a 3–2 win at home over Colorado Springs Switchbacks FC on September 4. Near the end of that match, Switchbacks player Michee Ngalina was sent off after forcefully throwing a soccer ball toward a ball boy behind one of the goals. Ngalina was fined and suspended for 2 matches following the incident. After a loss away to Austin Bold FC, the club won its three remaining matches that month at home to Real Monarchs, away at San Antonio FC, and at home to Rio Grande Valley FC Toros.

=== October ===
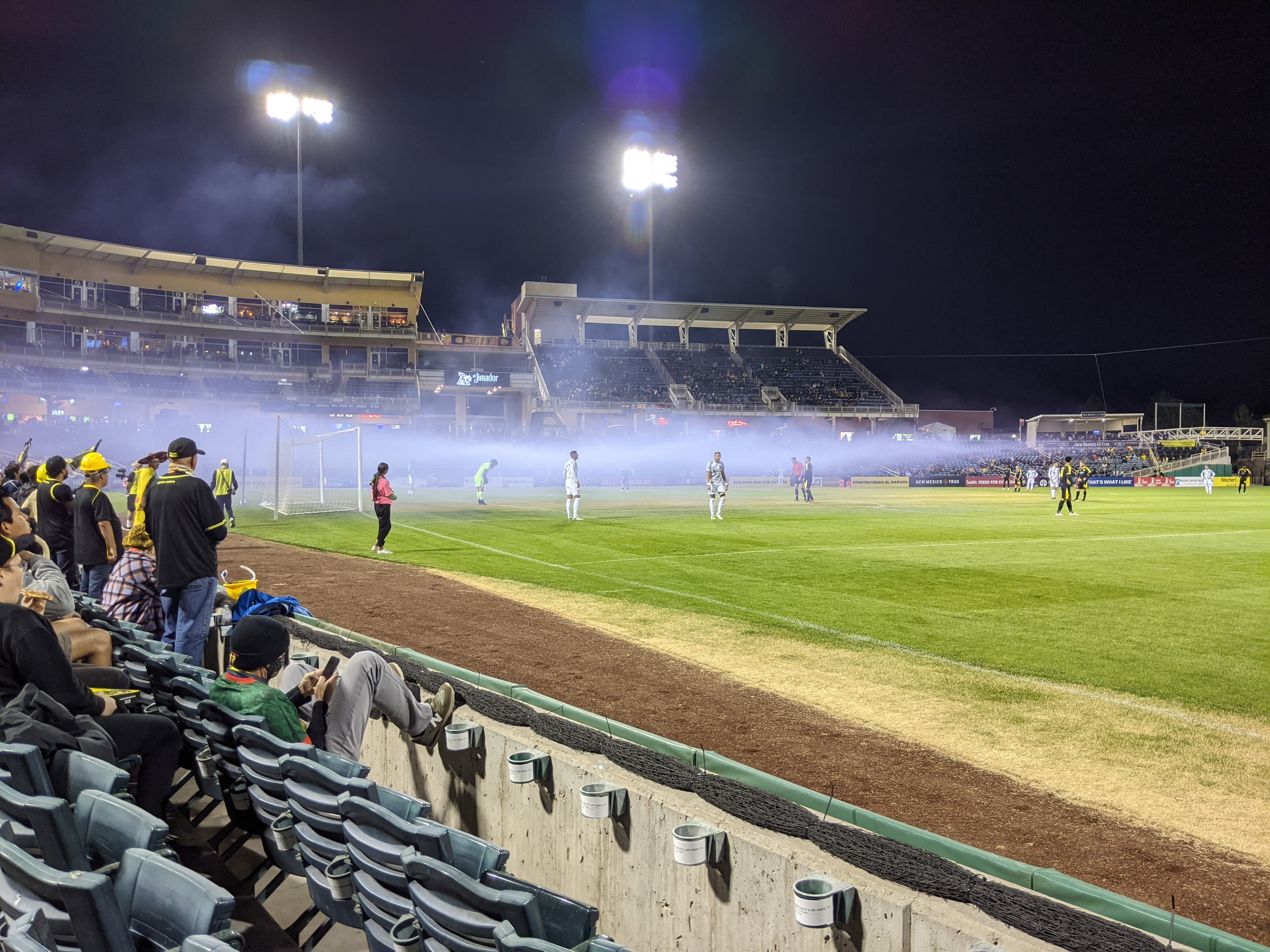
Smoke from a smoke bomb lingers in the San Antonio penalty area following the start of the October 20th, 2021 regular season match at Isotopes Park

The club lost the first of its 7 matches in October away at Louisville City FC, losing 3–1 as their captain Paolo DelPiccolo scored twice in the opening 15 minutes. They then drew 2–2 at home to Hartford Athletic on October 6, in their third and final match against Eastern Conference opposition in the regular season. Three days later, on October 9 they again drew at home, playing Rio Grande Valley FC Toros to a 1–1 draw. The club drew their third game in a row October 17 away to San Diego Loyal SC, which saw them move into 4th place. In the penultimate home match of the regular season, New Mexico United beat San Antonio FC 4–2. Chris Wehan scored a brace, just his third for the club and his first since July 31, 2019. Despite winning their final game of the season 3–1 at home to Real Monarchs, other results left the club 5th in the Mountain Division, and out of the USL Championship playoffs.

=== November ===
On November 5, after the conclusion of New Mexico United's season, the club announced the departure of head coach Troy Lesesne. Lesesne, who had coached the team since their inaugural 2019 season, chose not to renew his contract.

== Club roster ==
As of October 30, 2021

No.	Name	Nationality	Position(s)	Date of birth (age)	Season signed	Previous club	Apps. (Note: All competitive matches; includes substitute appearances)	Goals (Note: Goals in all competitions)
Goalkeepers
1	Alex Tambakis	(Greece)	GK	December 8, 1992 (age 33)	2021	(United States) North Carolina FC	31	0
12	Will Palmquist	(United States)	GK	December 3, 1997 (age 28)	2021	—	0	0
27	Philipp Beigl	(Germany)	GK	September 27, 1992 (age 33)	2020	(Germany) TSV Landsberg	1	0
Defenders
3	Austin Yearwood	(United States)	LB	August 12, 1994 (age 31)	2019	(United States) Richmond Kickers	68	1
4	Sam Hamilton	(United States)	DM/CB	July 26, 1995 (age 31)	2019	(United States) Colorado Rapids	49	2
5	Josh Suggs	(United States)	LB/CB	April 24, 1989 (age 37)	2019	(United States) Colorado Springs Switchbacks	74	4
6	David Najem	(Afghanistan)	RB/RM/LB	May 26, 1992 (age 34)	2020	(United States) Tampa Bay Rowdies	27	0
15	Rashid Tetteh	(Ghana)	CB	July 14, 1995 (age 31)	2019	(United States) High Point Panthers	64	0
16	Alex Touche	(England)	CB	June 2, 1999 (age 27)	2021	(United States) Lionsbridge FC	3	0
17	Justin Schmidt	(United States)	LB/CB	November 2, 1993 (age 32)	2019	(United States) Sacramento Republic	60	2
22	Kalen Ryden	(United States)	CB/LB	January 29, 1991 (age 35)	2020	(United States) Real Monarchs	46	2
Midfielders
7	Isidro Martinez	(United States)	DM/CM	March 15, 1997 (age 29)	2021	(United States) Rio Grande Valley FC Toros	30	1
8	Juan Pablo Guzmán	(Colombia)	DM/CM	August 31, 1988 (age 37)	2019	(United States) Oklahoma City Energy	73	0
11	Sergio Rivas	(Mexico)	AM	October 3, 1997 (age 28)	2021	(United States) Reno 1868	29	5
19	Saalih Muhammad	(United States)	DM/CM	August 25, 1995 (age 30)	2021	(United States) Oakland Roots SC (on loan)	43	2
20	Andrew Tinari	(United States)	CM	September 12, 1995 (age 30)	2020	(United States) Tampa Bay Rowdies	44	3
23	Micheal Azira	(Uganda)	M/DM	August 22, 1987 (age 38)	2021	(United States) Chicago Fire FC	28	1
25	Daniel Bruce	(England)	RW/RM	May 13, 1996 (age 30)	2019	(United States) UNC Charlotte 49ers	68	5
33	Harry Swartz	(United States)	RB/RM	March 19, 1996 (age 30)	2021	(United States) Hartford Athletic	12	0
41	Chris Wehan	(United States)	AM/CM/LM	January 29, 1994 (age 32)	2021	(United States) Orange County SC	66	28
Forwards
9	Devon Sandoval	(United States)	CF	June 16, 1991 (age 35)	2019	(United States) Atlanta United 2	79	25
10	Amando Moreno	(El Salvador)	LW/RW/AM	September 10, 1995 (age 30)	2020	(United States) Chicago Fire	36	11
14	Ilija Ilić	(Serbia)	CF	April 26, 1991 (age 35)	2021	(United States) Indy Eleven	22	3
45	Cristian Nava	(United States)	CF	September 2, 2003 (age 22)	2021	—	5	0

=== Transfers out ===
Pos.	No.	Player	To club	Exit date	Ref.
MF	14	(United States) Chris Wehan	(United States) Orange County SC	November 6, 2020	
MF	7	(United States) Ryan Williams	Retired	November 17, 2020	
MF	16	(United States) Saalih Muhammad	(United States) Oakland Roots SC	November 24, 2020	
FW	19	(Mexico) / (United States) David Estrada	Retired	November 26, 2020	
MF	26	(France) Joris Ahlinvi	Free agent	November 28, 2020	
GK	12	(United States) Ben Beaury	(United States) Oakland Roots SC	February 1, 2021	
FW	23	(United States) Sammy Sergi	(United States) Loudoun United	February 11, 2021	
GK	1	(United States) Cody Mizell	(United States) New York City FC	March 3, 2021	
DF	6	(Afghanistan) David Najem	Free agent	—	(Note: Did not appear in the club's 2021 roster.)

==== Loans out ====
Pos.	No.	Player	To club	Exit date	Until	Ref.
CF	99	(Jamaica) Brian Brown	(United States) Oakland Roots SC	August 27, 2021	End of season	

=== Transfers in ===
Pos.	No.	Player	From club	Date	Ref.
FW	14	(Serbia) Ilija Ilić	(United States) Indy Eleven	December 14, 2020	
MF	2	(United States) Harry Swartz	(United States) Hartford Athletic	December 18, 2020	
MF	11	(Mexico) Sergio Rivas	(United States) Reno 1868	December 24, 2020	
MF	7	(United States) Isidro Martinez	(United States) Rio Grande Valley FC Toros	January 4, 2021	
DF	16	(England) Alex Touche	(United States) Lionsbridge FC	January 12, 2021	
MF	23	(Uganda) Micheal Azira	(United States) Chicago Fire FC	February 1, 2021	
FW	99	(Jamaica) Brian Brown	(Albania) Partizani Tirana	February 8, 2021	
GK	1	(Greece) Alex Tambakis	(United States) North Carolina FC	March 11, 2021	
DF	6	(Afghanistan) David Najem	Unattached	July 28, 2021	
MF	41	(United States) Chris Wehan	(United States) Orange County SC	August 17, 2021	
GK	12	(United States) Will Palmquist	Unattached	August 18, 2021	

==== Loans in ====
Pos.	No.	Player	From club	Date	Until	Ref.
MF	19	(United States) Saalih Muhammad	(United States) Oakland Roots SC	August 27, 2021	End of season	

== Competitions ==
=== Exhibition ===
On March 1, United announced 6 preseason friendlies; three of which will be held in Albuquerque, and 3 of which will be held away.

March 20 Preseason	New Mexico United	1–2	El Paso Locomotive FC	Albuquerque, New Mexico
3:00 pm	Sandoval 37' (pen.); (yellow card) 40'; Semelsberger (yellow card) 48'	KRQE Report; ELP Report	Herrera (yellow card) 40'; Trialist 1 45+2'; Carrijó 61'; (yellow card) 65'	Stadium: Mesa del Sol - Training Facility

March 27 Preseason	Colorado Rapids	1–0	New Mexico United	Tucson, Arizona
TBA	Shinyashiki 23' (Abubakar); (yellow card) 43'; Namli (yellow card) 45'; Wilkerson (yellow card) 77'; Rosenberry (yellow card) 78'	Report	(yellow card) 31'; Guzmán (yellow card) 42'; Suggs (yellow card) 56'; (yellow card) 86'	Stadium: Kino North Stadium

April 3 Preseason	San Diego Loyal	1–2	New Mexico United	Chula Vista, California
12:00 pm	Stoneman 64' (Adams)	NMU Report; SD Report	Moreno 27' (yellow card); Sandoval 86'	Stadium: Chula Vista Elite Athlete Training Center; Attendance: closed door match

April 10 Preseason	New Mexico United	4–2	Colorado Springs Switchbacks FC	Albuquerque, New Mexico
12:00 pm	Martinez 21', 84'; Moreno 44'; Swartz 45+3'	Report	17'; 50'; Argueta (yellow card) 79'	Stadium: Mesa del Sol - Training Facility; Attendance: 300

April 17 Preseason	New Mexico United	3–1	FC Tucson	Albuquerque, New Mexico
11:00 am	Suggs 29'; Schmidt 48'; Moreno 72'	Report	31'	Stadium: Mesa del Sol - Training Facility

April 24 Preseason	Phoenix Rising FC	0–4	New Mexico United	Chandler, Arizona
1:pm MDT			Swartz 7'; Martinez 62'; Brown 78'	Stadium: Wild Horse Pass Stadium

=== USL Championship ===
On January 21, the USL Board of Governors announced the format for the 2021 season, which would divide the Eastern and Western Conferences into two smaller divisions. Teams will play 32 regular season matches, playing a quadruple round-robin schedule against teams in their division, and playing other opponents to reach 32 games played. On March 2, the final division alignment was released, placing New Mexico United into the Mountain Division, alongside Austin Bold FC, Colorado Springs Switchbacks FC, El Paso Locomotive FC, Real Monarchs, RGV FC Toros, and San Antonio FC. As the only division with 7 teams instead of 8, the Mountain Division will play 24 regular season matches against division opponents, and 8 against regional or cross-conference opponents.

==== Group table ====
Mountain Division

Pos	Team	Pld	W	L	T	GF	GA	GD	Pts	Qualification
1	El Paso Locomotive FC	32	18	4	10	56	34	+22	64	Advance to USL Championship Playoffs
2	San Antonio FC	32	14	8	10	50	38	+12	52	Advance to USL Championship Playoffs
3	Colorado Springs Switchbacks FC	32	13	8	11	61	48	+13	50	Advance to USL Championship Playoffs
4	Rio Grande Valley FC Toros	32	13	11	8	49	42	+7	47	Advance to USL Championship Playoffs
5	New Mexico United	32	12	10	10	44	40	+4	46	
6	Austin Bold FC	32	10	10	12	32	42	−10	42	
7	Real Monarchs	32	5	20	7	28	56	−28	22	

Source: USL

==== Results summary ====
Overall								Home						Away					
Pld	W	D	L	GF	GA	GD	Pts	W	D	L	GF	GA	GD	W	D	L	GF	GA	GD
32	12	10	10	44	40	+4	46	9	6	1	29	15	+14	3	4	9	15	25	−10

Last updated: October 17, 2021.

==== Results by matchday ====
Position in the Mountain Division
Round	1	2	3	4	5	6	7	8	9	10	11	12	13	14	15	16	17	18	19	20	21	22	23	24	25	26	27	28	29	30	31	32
Stadium	A	A	H	A	H	A	H	H	A	A	A	H	H	A	H	A	H	H	A	A	H	A	H	H	A	A	H	H	A	H	A	H
Result	L	D	W	W	L	W	D	W	L	L	L	W	W	L	D	D	D	D	D	L	W	L	W	W	W	L	D	D	D	W	L	W
Position	6	5	3	2	3	3	3	2	4	4	5	3	3	3	3	4	6	6	6	6	5	6	6	6	4	5	5	5	4	4	4	5

A = Away; H = Home; W = Win; D = Draw; L = Loss

==== Matches ====
Home team is listed first, left to right.

Win Draw Loss Postponed

Kickoff times are in MDT (UTC-06) unless shown otherwise

May 1 1	Rio Grande Valley FC Toros	1–0	New Mexico United	Edinburg, Texas
6:30 p.m. MDT	Riley (yellow card) 27'; Robinson (yellow card) 29'; Amoh (yellow card) 44', (goal) 65'	Report	Guzmán (yellow card) 7'; Ryden (yellow card) 17'	Stadium: H-E-B Park; Attendance: 2,567; Referee: Elton Garcia (United States)

May 8 2	El Paso Locomotive FC	1–1	New Mexico United	El Paso, Texas
7:30 p.m. MDT	Yuma (yellow card) 7'; Rebellón (yellow card) 26'; Mares (yellow card) 75'; Carrijo 90+5'	Report	Sandoval 57', (yellow card) 87'; Guzmán (yellow card) 66'; Suggs (yellow card) 90+2'	Stadium: Southwest University Park; Attendance: 5,740; Referee: Ismir Pekmic (United States)

May 15 3 Home Opener	New Mexico United	3–1	Austin Bold FC	Albuquerque, New Mexico
7:30 p.m. MDT	Rivas 18'; Yearwood (yellow card) 56'; Brown 61'; Moreno 66', (yellow card) 84'; Azira (yellow card) 90'; Bruce (yellow card) 90+2'	Report	Fauroux (yellow card) 28'; Hinds 46'; Rissi (yellow card) 73'	Stadium: Isotopes Park; Attendance: 8,647; Referee: Michael Radchuk (USA)

May 21 4	Colorado Springs Switchbacks	1–3	New Mexico United	Colorado Springs, Colorado
7:00 p.m. MDT	Barry 1'; Ngalina (yellow card) 45+1'; Ockford (yellow card) 90+5'	Report	Rivas 8'; Swartz (yellow card) 16'; Tinari (yellow card) 45+1' (yellow-red card) 54'; Moreno 48', (yellow card) 58'; Martinez (yellow card) 62'; Bruce 90+7'	Stadium: Weidner Field; Attendance: 5,600; Referee: Elijio Arreguin (United States)

May 29 5	New Mexico United	0–1	Loudoun United FC	Albuquerque, New Mexico
7:30 p.m. MDT	Yearwood (red card) 23'	Report	Bolívar 40'; Mehl (yellow card) 57'; Samaké (yellow card) 60'	Stadium: Isotopes Park; Attendance: 8,801; Referee: Chris Ruska

June 4 6	Real Monarchs	0–1	New Mexico United	Sandy, Utah
8:00 p.m. MDT	Flores (yellow card) 22'; Bance (yellow card) 82'	Report	Tinari (yellow card) 65'; Martinez 82'	Stadium: Rio Tinto Stadium; Attendance: 1,088; Referee: Lukasz Szpala (United States)

June 12 7 Pride Night	New Mexico United	0–0	Austin Bold FC	Albuquerque, New Mexico
7:30 p.m. MDT		Report	Gordon (yellow card) 17'; Diouf (yellow card) 52'	Stadium: Isotopes Park; Attendance: 9,288; Referee: Sergii Demianchuk (United States)

June 16 8	New Mexico United	2–0	San Antonio FC	Albuquerque, New Mexico
7:30 p.m. MDT	Suggs 33'; Yearwood 52'	Report	Doyle (yellow card) 68'; Nathan (yellow card) 77'; Gleadle (yellow card) 82'; Varela (yellow card) 90'	Stadium: Isotopes Park; Attendance: 6,260; Referee: Elton García

June 25 9	Colorado Springs Switchbacks	3–1	New Mexico United	Colorado Springs, Colorado
7:00 p.m. MDT	Mahoney (yellow card) 49'; Beckford 59'; Barry 69', 82', (yellow card) 83'; Ockford (yellow card) 88'; Mayaka (yellow card) 90+1'	Report	Suggs 19'; Martinez (yellow card) 90+2'	Stadium: Weidner Field; Attendance: 6,481; Referee: Mathew Corrigan (United States)

June 30 10	Real Monarchs	3–2	New Mexico United	Herriman, Utah
8:00 p.m. MDT	Portillo 38'; Briggs 54'; Powder 65'	Report	Bruce 15'; Tinari 25'	Stadium: Zions Bank Stadium; Attendance: 965; Referee: Calin Radosav (United States)

July 3 11	El Paso Locomotive FC	2–1	New Mexico United	El Paso, Texas
7:30 p.m. MDT	Borelli (yellow card) 33'; Mares 56', 57'; Jérôme (yellow card) 76'	Report	Brown (yellow card) 33', (goal) 41'; Guzmán (yellow card) 48'	Stadium: Southwest University Park; Attendance: 8,138; Referee: Elvis Osmanovic

July 9 12	New Mexico United	3–1	Colorado Springs Switchbacks	Albuquerque, New Mexico
7:30 p.m. MDT	Rivas 16', (yellow card) 20'; Suggs (yellow card) 50'; Sandoval (yellow card) 52'; Azira (yellow card) 75', (goal) 90+1'; Yearwood (yellow card) 79'; Ilić 90+4'	Report	Makangila (yellow card) 16'; Ockford (yellow card) 19'; Barry 33'; Ngalina (yellow card) 50'; Anderson (red card) 53'; Mayaka (yellow card) 68'	Stadium: Isotopes Park; Attendance: 9728; Referee: Matthew Thompson (United States)

July 12 13 Monday Night Futbol	New Mexico United	2–1	Charleston Battery	Albuquerque, New Mexico
7:30 p.m. MDT	Ryden 15', (yellow card) 48'; Guzmán (yellow card) 43'; Sandoval 52'; Ilić (yellow card) 82'; Suggs (yellow card) 86'; Rivas (yellow card) 90'; Azira (yellow card) 90+3'	Report	Repetto 38'; Kelly-Rosales (yellow card) 43'; Méndez (yellow card) 58'; Piggott (yellow card) 76'; Fahling (red card) 90+4'	Stadium: Isotopes Park; Attendance: 7,576; Referee: Jon Freemon (United States)

July 21 14	San Antonio FC	3–0	New Mexico United	San Antonio, Texas
7:30 p.m. MDT	Fogaça 35', 63'; Cuello (yellow card) 68'; Doyle (yellow card) 73'; Gallegos 90+3'	Report		Stadium: Toyota Field; Attendance: 5,601; Referee: Natalie Simon (United States)

July 24 15	New Mexico United	0–0	El Paso Locomotive FC	Albuquerque, New Mexico
7:30 p.m. MDT	Guzmán (yellow card) 26' (yellow-red card) 66'; Tinari (yellow card) 83'	Report	Zacarías (yellow card) 75'; Yuma (yellow card) 90+4'	Stadium: Isotopes Park; Attendance: 10,303; Referee: Greg Dopka

August 1 16	Tacoma Defiance	0–0	New Mexico United	Tacoma, Washington
2:30 p.m. MDT	Mendoza (yellow card) 7'	Report	Moreno (yellow card) 5'; Yearwood (yellow card) 41'; Beigl (yellow card) 68'	Stadium: Cheney Stadium; Referee: Matthew Franz

August 14 17 Meow Wolf Night	New Mexico United	1–1	El Paso Locomotive FC	Albuquerque, New Mexico
7:30 p.m. MDT	Moreno 33', (yellow card) 64'; Sandoval (yellow card) 75'; Tinari (yellow card) 77'; Bruce (yellow card) 78'	Report	Luna (red card) 77'; Carrijo (yellow card) 79'; Bahner 90+7'	Stadium: Isotopes Park; Attendance: 10,418; Referee: Lukasz Szpala

August 18 18	New Mexico United	1–1	Oakland Roots SC	Albuquerque, New Mexico
7:30 p.m. MDT	Sandoval 6'; Moreno (yellow card) 83'	Report	Fall 34'	Stadium: Isotopes Park; Attendance: 6,047; Referee: Elton Garcia (United States)

August 23 19	Austin Bold FC	1–1	New Mexico United	Austin, Texas
7:00 p.m. MDT	Avila 55'	Report	Tinari (yellow card) 17'; Wehan 37'; Schmidt (yellow card) 90+2'	Stadium: Bold Stadium; Attendance: 608; Referee: Brandon Stevis

August 28 20	Phoenix Rising FC	3–2	New Mexico United	Chandler, Arizona
8:30 p.m. MDT	King (yellow card) 19'; Calistri 59', 66'; Moar 90'	Report	Rivas 11'; Guzmán (yellow card) 34'; Tetteh (yellow card) 43'; Suggs (yellow card) 54'; Musa 80' (o.g.)	Stadium: Wild Horse Pass Stadium

September 4 21 Blackout Night	New Mexico United	3–2	Colorado Springs Switchbacks	Albuquerque, New Mexico
7:30 p.m. MDT	Wehan 3', (yellow card) 90+2'; Tetteh (yellow card) 34'; Suggs 42'; Sandoval 47' (pen.), (yellow card) 58'	Report	Tetteh 23' (o.g.); Hodge 63'; Ockford (yellow card) 68'; Toure 88'; Ngalina (red card) 90+3'	Stadium: Isotopes Park; Attendance: 7,077; Referee: Joshua Encarnación

September 10 22	Austin Bold FC	1–0	New Mexico United	Austin, Texas
7:00 p.m. MDT	Gordon (yellow card) 26'; Garcia (yellow card) 54'; Avila (yellow card) 58'; Ciss (yellow card) 71'; Báez 78' (pen.); Sarkodie (yellow card) 90+3'	Report	Guzmán (yellow card) 71'; Azira (yellow card) 77'; Yearwood (yellow card) 90+1'	Stadium: Bold Stadium; Attendance: 926; Referee: Kevin Broadley

September 18 23	New Mexico United	2–1	Real Monarchs	Albuquerque, New Mexico
7:30 p.m. MDT	Moreno (yellow card) 2', (goal) 48'; Bruce (yellow card) 24'; Wehan 80'; Muhammad (yellow card) 90+6'	Report	Conteh (yellow card) 25'; Wehan 50'; Subah (yellow card) 58'	Stadium: Isotopes Park

September 25 24	San Antonio FC	0–1	New Mexico United	San Antonio, Texas
6:30 p.m. MDT	Sjöberg (yellow card) 38'	Report	Tetteh (yellow card) 29'; Tinari (yellow card) 72'; Ryden (yellow card) 74'; Wehan 84'; Martinez (yellow card) 85'	Stadium: Toyota Field; Attendance: 5,503; Referee: Elton García

September 29 25	New Mexico United	2–0	Rio Grande Valley FC Toros	Albuquerque, New Mexico
7:00 p.m. MDT	Muhammad 18', (yellow card) 89'; Suggs (yellow card) 85'; Sandoval (yellow card) 90'; Wehan 90+6'	Report	Diz (yellow card) 54'	Stadium: Isotopes Park; Attendance: 5,377; Referee: Adam Kilpatrick

October 3 26	Louisville City FC	3–1	New Mexico United	Louisville, Kentucky
1:00 p.m. MDT	DelPiccolo 8', 14'; McLaughlin 75'; McCabe (yellow card) 77'; Ownby (yellow card) 84'	Report	Tetteh (yellow card) 24'; Moreno 45+2', (yellow card) 54'; Suggs (yellow card) 74'; Azira (yellow card) 88'	Stadium: Lynn Family Stadium; Attendance: 10,349; Referee: Mark Allatin

October 6 27	New Mexico United	2–2	Hartford Athletic	Albuquerque, New Mexico
7:00 p.m. MDT	Rivas 26'; Wehan (yellow card) 35'; Sandoval (yellow card) 45+3', (goal) 55'; Muhammad (yellow card) 53'	Report	Barrera 45+5' (pen.); Obregón Jr. 48'; Boudadi (yellow card) 84'	Stadium: Isotopes Park; Attendance: 6,444; Referee: Brad Jensen

October 9 28 Homecoming Night	New Mexico United	1–1	Rio Grande Valley FC	Albuquerque, New Mexico
5:00 p.m. MDT	Ryden (yellow card) 19'; Wehan 24'; Bruce (yellow card) 52'; Rivas (yellow card) 57'	Report	Amoh 5', (yellow card) 90+4'; Pimentel (yellow card) 32'; López (yellow card) 90+3'	Stadium: Isotopes Park; Attendance: 6,934; Referee: Malik Badawi

October 17 29	San Diego Loyal SC	1–1	New Mexico United	San Diego, California
4:00 p.m. MDT	Martínez 61', (yellow card) 67'	Report	Tinari (yellow card) 21'; Guzmán (yellow card) 41'; Suggs (yellow card) 50'; Wehan (yellow card) 76'; Ilić 90+4'	Stadium: Torero Stadium; Attendance: 4,700; Referee: Sergii Demianchuk

October 20 30	New Mexico United	4–2	San Antonio FC	Albuquerque, New Mexico
7:00 p.m. MDT	Ilić 12'; Tetteh (yellow card) 21'; Suggs (yellow card) 31'; Yearwood (yellow card) 33'; Ryden (yellow card) 38'; Wehan 66', 88'; Guzmán (yellow card) 72'; Tinari 78'; Tambakis (yellow card) 82'	Report	PC (yellow card) 9'; Fogaça (yellow card) 26', (goal) 32' (pen.); Gallegos (yellow card) 28'; Varela 35', (yellow card) 41'; Wright (yellow card) 47' (yellow-red card) 58'; Ford (yellow card) 86'; Deplagne (yellow card) 90+3'; Epps (yellow card) 90+6'	Stadium: Isotopes Park; Attendance: 5,593; Referee: Michael Radchuk

October 23 31	Rio Grande Valley FC	2–0	New Mexico United	Edinburg, Texas
6:30 p.m. MDT	López 47', (yellow card) 59'; Edwards 58'	Report	Tetteh (yellow card) 78'	Stadium: H-E-B Park; Attendance: 4,118; Referee: Brandon Stevis (United States)

October 30 32 Dia De Los Muertos	New Mexico United	3–1	Real Monarchs	Albuquerque, New Mexico
5:00 p.m. MDT	Wehan 17' 45+3' (pen.); Bruce 81'; Muhammad (yellow card) 89'	Report	Mata 40'; Subah (yellow card) 73'	Stadium: Isotopes Park; Attendance: 9,570; Referee: Elijio Arreguin (United States)

=== U.S. Open Cup ===
After cancelling the 2020 U.S. Open Cup due to the COVID-19 pandemic in the United States, on February 9 the United States Soccer Federation announced an abbreviated format for the 2021 edition, limiting the field of participants to 24 clubs. Originally, 8 spots were reserved for the USL Championship, with 24 of 31 teams eligible to compete. However, on March 29, the tournament was further abbreviated to include 16 teams. The 4 2020 USL Conference finalists were confirmed to participate, so New Mexico United will not play the 2021 U.S. Open Cup.

== Statistics ==
As of October 30, 2021

=== Outfield players ===
#	Pos.	Name	GP	GS	Min.	Goals	Assists	A yellow rectangle, denoting the yellow penalty card shown to a player being cautioned	A red rectangle, denoting the red penalty card shown to a player being sent off
3	DF	(United States) Austin Yearwood	31	28	2393	1	0	5	1
4	DF	(United States) Sam Hamilton	11	10	878	0	0	0	0
5	DF	(United States) Josh Suggs	31	24	2272	3	2	8	0
6	DF	(Afghanistan) David Najem	14	11	836	0	2	0	0
7	MF	(United States) Isidro Martinez	30	10	1217	1	3	3	0
8	MF	(Colombia) Juan Guzmán	25	23	1851	0	2	9	1
9	FW	(United States) Devon Sandoval	28	20	1773	5	1	6	0
10	FW	(El Salvador) Amando Moreno	19	16	1365	5	0	8	0
11	MF	(Mexico) Sergio Rivas	29	26	2214	5	3	3	0
14	FW	(Serbia) Ilija Ilić	22	7	782	2	0	1	0
15	DF	(Ghana) Rashid Tetteh	21	21	1803	0	0	6	0
16	DF	(England) Alex Touche	3	0	21	0	0	0	0
17	DF	(United States) Justin Schmidt	23	9	1051	0	1	1	0
19	MF	(United States) Saalih Muhammad (Note: Player joined club after the season started)	9	3	396	1	0	4	0
20	MF	(United States) Andrew Tinari	28	24	1824	1	7	7	1
22	DF	(United States) Kalen Ryden	29	28	2543	1	0	5	0
23	MF	(Uganda) Micheal Azira	28	11	1170	1	0	5	0
25	MF	(England) Daniel Bruce	30	19	1574	3	3	4	0
33	MF	(United States) Harry Swartz	12	9	835	0	2	1	0
41	MF	(United States) Chris Wehan	15	14	1210	10	1	3	0
45	FW	(United States) Cristian Nava	5	0	41	0	0	0	0
99	FW	(Jamaica) Brian Brown (Note: Player left club before the end of the season)	13	7	625	2	1	1	0

=== Goalkeepers ===
#	Name	GP	GS	Min.	SV	SV%	GA	GAA	SO	A yellow rectangle, denoting the yellow penalty card shown to a player being cautioned	A red rectangle, denoting the red penalty card shown to a player being sent off
1	(Greece) Alex Tambakis	31	31	2790	84	69.4%	37	1.194	7	1	0
12	(United States) Will Palmquist	0	0	0	0	—	0	—	0	0	0
27	(Germany) Philipp Beigl	1	1	90	2	40%	3	3.000	0	1	0
