= 2020 New Mexico United season =

New Mexico United
2020 season
- Head coach: Troy Lesesne
- Stadium: Rio Grande Credit Union Field at Isotopes Park; Albuquerque, New Mexico
- USL: Conference: 6th Group C: 2nd
- USL Cup Playoffs: Conf. Semifinals
- 2020 U.S. Open Cup: Cancelled
- Four Corners Cup: Cancelled
- Biggest win: OKC 0–3 NM (August 1)
- Biggest defeat: PHX 5–2 NM (August 8)
Home colours	Away colours

The 2020 New Mexico United season was the second season for New Mexico United in the USL Championship (USLC), the second-tier professional soccer league in the United States and Canada. This article covers the period from November 18, 2019, the day after the 2019 USLC Playoff Final, to the conclusion of the 2020 USLC Playoff Final, scheduled for November 12–16, 2020.

On March 12 the season was suspended for a minimum of 30 days due to concerns for player and fans health during the COVID-19 pandemic.

On June 4, the league announced a return to play on July 11, 2020 and on July 2 the club announced its updated schedule.

== Season in Review ==
=== Off-season and Pre-season ===
The club completed its inaugural season by leading the league in attendance while qualifying for the last playoff spot in the western conference, although they fell in the play-in round to the Sacramento Republic. Their run to the quarter-finals of the U.S. Open Cup saw them eliminate two established USLC clubs and two MLS clubs before falling to eventual runners-up Minnesota United FC. One week after their elimination from the playoffs in October, the club announced that they would be retaining a majority (thirteen) of the players from the inaugural season roster. Fullback Ethen Sampson and midfielders Ken Akamatsu, Tommy Madden, and Toni Soler left the club at the expiration of their contracts after the 2019 season. In November, the club announced that they had signed new contracts with two additional inaugural season players, midfielder Daniel Bruce and defender Manny Padilla. Santi Moar departed the club in December, moving to Four Corners Cup opponent Phoenix Rising FC.

The club announced their first signing of the off-season, Amando Moreno, on December 5, followed by 2019 USL Cup winner Kalen Ryden on December 17. January saw three additions to the squad in goalkeeper Philipp Beigl, forward Sammy Sergi, and defender David Najem. On January 29, New Mexico United drew USL League One opponent Greenville Triumph SC in the Second Round of the U.S. Open Cup, to be played April 7. The club announced the signing of midfielder Andrew Tinari on February 7, the day before a scheduled preseason friendly against Colorado Springs Switchbacks. However, inclement weather in Colorado Springs precluded the team from travelling to Albuquerque, and the match was canceled, replaced by a 60-minute intrasquad scrimmage. On February 12, 2019, top scorer Kevaughn Frater completed a move to Indian Super League club Bengaluru FC on a short-term contract. The next day, French midfielder Joris Ahlinvi became the final preseason addition to the squad, after not signing with FC Cincinnati as 53rd overall pick in the 2020 MLS SuperDraft.

The club played preseason exhibitions against USL Championship opponents El Paso Locomotive, OKC Energy FC, Phoenix Rising FC, and USL League One Phoenix affiliate FC Tucson, all behind closed doors.

Also during February, New Mexico state legislators approved a $4.1 million capital outlay to fund feasibility and design studies for a potential soccer-specific stadium in the city of Albuquerque.

=== March ===
New Mexico United began the 2020 competitive season away at fellow 2019 expansion team Austin Bold FC. New signings Najem, Ryden, Parkes, and Sergi all debuted in the eventual 1–0 loss. Before the next scheduled match against FC Tulsa, on March 12 the season was suspended for 30 days due to the COVID-19 pandemic in the United States. The next day, the U.S. Open Cup announced a temporary suspension of the competition. The club's Second Round entrance against Greenville Triumph was therefore postponed indefinitely. On March 18, the suspension was extended until May 10 to comply with CDC recommendations. As a result, games scheduled against FC Tulsa away on March 14, El Paso Locomotive FC at home on March 21, and Las Vegas Lights FC at home on March 25 were postponed.

=== April ===
All matches in April were postponed due to the suspension of play. Games scheduled against Colorado Springs Switchbacks away on April 4, LA Galaxy II at home on April 11, Sacramento Republic away on April 18, and Real Monarchs at home on April 25 were postponed. On April 30, the USL again extended the suspension, this time without setting a firm return date.

=== May ===
All matches in May were postponed due to the suspension of play. Games scheduled against San Antonio FC away on May 9, Rio Grande Valley FC Toros away on May 16, Orange County SC at home on May 23, Portland Timbers 2 away on May 27, and away at Las Vegas Lights FC on May 30 were postponed.

=== June ===
The first three matches in June were postponed due to the suspension of play, including games scheduled against OKC Energy at home on June 10, Phoenix Rising at home on June 13, and Reno 1868 away on June 20. On June 24, the USL released a revised competition format to play an abbreviated season, aiming to return in July. Teams would be drawn into eight regional groups of four or five teams, with the top two from each group advancing to the 2020 USL playoffs. The following day, the club was placed into Group C with Colorado Springs Switchbacks, El Paso Locomotive, and Real Monarchs.

=== July ===
On July 2, the revised schedule was finalized to include inter-group matches against OKC Energy, Phoenix Rising, and Rio Grande Valley FC Toros. Before the season restarted, on July 9 New Mexico Governor Michelle Lujan Grisham announced that the club would not play games or practice in New Mexico, as part of a wider moratorium on contact sports ordered in response to the coronavirus pandemic. On July 11, New Mexico United resumed play at Colorado Springs Switchbacks in their second competitive match of 2020. Chris Wehan and Saalih Muhammad scored to earn a 2–1 win, the latter of which would win the league's online fan poll goal of the week award. Wehan and Devon Sandoval scored in a 2–2 away draw at El Paso Locomotive on July 15, both scoring again in a 2–1 win in a repeat fixture ten days later. Sandoval won the club's second goal of the week in three for United's second in the latter match on July 24, which would end up being the winner. Cody Mizell won the fan-selected save of the week award in the same game, saving from a headed corner kick.

Two players left the club in July, one temporarily and one permanently. Goalkeeper Ben Beaury left on a season-long loan to Reno 1868 on July 6, leaving Philipp Beigl as second-choice behind Cody Mizell. On July 25, the club released defender Manny Padilla following an investigation into a sexual misconduct case during Padilla's collegiate soccer career.

=== August ===
The club began August with a 3–0 away win over inter-group opponents OKC Energy. Wehan scored in his fourth consecutive game since the resumption of play, along with Amando Moreno and Joris Ahlinvi, the first two new signings to score for the club. On August 8, the club played their second consecutive inter-group match away against Phoenix Rising. Romeo Parkes scored the opening goal in an eventual 5–2 loss, which included a Junior Flemmings hat-trick.

== Club ==
=== Roster ===
As of July 25, 2020

No.	Name	Nationality	Position(s)	Date of birth (age)	Season signed	Previous club	Apps. (Note: All competitive matches; includes substitute appearances)	Goals (Note: Goals in all competitions)
Goalkeepers
1	Cody Mizell	(United States)	GK	September 30, 1991 (age 34)	2019	(United States) Tampa Bay Rowdies	57	0
18	Philipp Beigl	(Germany)	GK	September 27, 1992 (age 33)	2020	(Germany) TSV Landsberg	0	0
Defenders
3	Austin Yearwood	(United States)	LB	August 12, 1994 (age 32)	2019	(United States) Richmond Kickers	37	0
5	Josh Suggs	(United States)	LB/CB	April 24, 1989 (age 37)	2019	(United States) Colorado Springs Switchbacks	44	1
6	David Najem	(Afghanistan)	RB/RM/LB	May 26, 1992 (age 34)	2020	(United States) Tampa Bay Rowdies	13	0
15	Rashid Tetteh	(Ghana)	CB	July 14, 1995 (age 31)	2019	(United States) High Point Panthers	43	0
17	Justin Schmidt	(United States)	LB/CB	November 2, 1993 (age 32)	2019	(United States) Sacramento Republic	38	2
22	Kalen Ryden	(United States)	CB/LB	January 29, 1991 (age 35)	2020	(United States) Real Monarchs	17	1
Midfielders
4	Sam Hamilton	(United States)	DM/CB	July 26, 1995 (age 31)	2019	(United States) Colorado Rapids	39	2
7	Ryan Williams	(United States)	CM/AM	October 11, 1996 (age 29)	2019	(United States) John Brown University Golden Eagles	31	2
8	Juan Pablo Guzmán	(Colombia)	DM/CM	August 31, 1988 (age 38)	2019	(United States) Oklahoma City Energy	49	0
10	Amando Moreno	(United States)	LW/RW/AM	September 10, 1995 (age 31)	2020	(United States) Chicago Fire	17	6
14	Chris Wehan	(United States)	LM/CM/AM/SS	January 29, 1994 (age 32)	2019	(United States) San Jose Earthquakes	51	18
16	Saalih Muhammad	(United States)	CM/AM	August 25, 1995 (age 31)	2019	(United States) Penn FC	42	1
20	Andrew Tinari	(United States)	CM/AM	September 12, 1995 (age 31)	2020	(United States) Tampa Bay Rowdies	16	1
25	Daniel Bruce	(England)	RW/RM	May 13, 1996 (age 30)	2019	(United States) UNC Charlotte 49ers	37	2
26	Joris Ahlinvi	(France)	CM/RW	July 13, 1995 (age 31)	2020	(United States) Indiana Hoosiers	6	1
Forwards
9	Devon Sandoval	(United States)	CF	June 16, 1991 (age 35)	2019	(United States) Atlanta United 2	52	20
19	David Estrada	(Mexico) / (United States)	CF/RW/RM	February 4, 1988 (age 38)	2019	(United States) Tacoma Defiance	49	3
23	Sammy Sergi	(United States)	CF	July 2, 1996 (age 30)	2020	(United States) Xavier Musketeers	6	0
27	Romeo Parkes	(Jamaica)	CF/LW/RW	November 11, 1990 (age 35)	2020	(Republic of Ireland) Sligo Rovers (loan)	16	2

== Transfers ==
=== Transfers out ===
Pos.	No.	Player	To club	Exit date	Ref.
MF	20	(United States) Josh Goss	Free agent	Preseason	
MF	26	(Japan) Ken Akamatsu	Free agent	December 1, 2019	
MF	23	(United States) Tommy Madden	Free agent	December 1, 2019	
MF	6	(Spain) Toni Soler	Free agent	December 1, 2019	
DF	2	(South Africa) Ethen Sampson	Free agent	December 1, 2019	
FW	11	(Spain) Santi Moar	(United States) Phoenix Rising FC	December 3, 2019	
FW	10	(Jamaica) Kevaughn Frater	(India) Bengaluru FC	February 12, 2020	
DF	24	(United States) Manny Padilla	Released from contract	July 25, 2020	

==== Loans out ====
Pos.	No.	Player	To club	Start Date	End Date	Ref.
GK	12	(United States) Ben Beaury	(United States) Reno 1868 FC	July 6, 2020	End of season	

=== Transfers in ===
Pos.	No.	Player	From club	Date	Ref.
FW	10	(United States) Amando Moreno	(United States) Chicago Fire FC	December 5, 2019	
DF	22	(United States) Kalen Ryden	(United States) Real Monarchs	December 19, 2019	
GK	18	(Germany) Philipp Beigl	Free agent	January 16, 2020	
FW	23	(United States) Sammy Sergi	(United States) Xavier Musketeers	January 16, 2020	
DF	6	(Afghanistan) David Najem	(United States) Tampa Bay Rowdies	January 31, 2020	
MF	20	(United States) Andrew Tinari	(United States) Tampa Bay Rowdies	February 7, 2020	
MF	26	(France) Joris Ahlinvi	Free agent	February 13, 2020	

==== Loans in ====
Pos.	No.	Player	From club	Start Date	End Date	Ref.
FW	27	(Jamaica) Romeo Parkes	(Republic of Ireland) Sligo Rovers	January 3, 2020	End of season	

== Competitions ==
=== Exhibition ===
February 8 Preseason	New Mexico United	v	Colorado Springs Switchbacks FC	Albuquerque, New Mexico
12:00 pm		Report		Stadium: UNM Soccer Complex
Note: Match canceled. Colorado Springs was unable to travel due to weather.

February 8 Preseason	Team Somos	0–0 (4–2 p)	Team Unidos	Albuquerque, New Mexico
12:00 pm		Report		Stadium: UNM Soccer Complex; Attendance: 2,147
	Penalties
	Suggs (penalty missed); Sandoval (penalty scored); Hamilton (penalty scored); Muhammad (penalty scored); Padilla (penalty scored)		Sergi (penalty scored); Moreno (penalty scored); Tinari (penalty missed); Williams (penalty missed)
Note: Intrasquad scrimmage to replace canceled match vs Colorado Springs Switchbacks FC. Played in two 30-minute halves.

February 15 Preseason	El Paso Locomotive FC	1–4	New Mexico United	El Paso, Texas
	Zola (2nd half)	Report	Parkes 5'; Makinde 35' (o.g.); Sergi (2nd half); Sergi 80'	Stadium: Westside Training Fields; Attendance: Closed-door

February 23 Preseason	OKC Energy	1–2	New Mexico United	Tucson, Arizona
	Chavez 40'	Report	Moreno 35'; Sergi 75'	Stadium: Kino Sports Complex

February 26 Preseason	Phoenix Rising FC	0–1	New Mexico United	Tucson, Arizona
		Report	Wehan 37'	Stadium: Kino North Stadium; Attendance: Closed to the public

February 28 Preseason	FC Tucson	2-0	New Mexico United	Tucson, Arizona
	trialist 70'; Adams 80'			Stadium: Kino North Stadium; Attendance: Closed to the public

=== USL Championship ===
==== Standings — Group C ====
Pos	Team	Pld	W	D	L	GF	GA	GD	Pts	PPG	Qualification
1	El Paso Locomotive FC	16	9	5	2	24	14	+10	32	2.00	Advance to USL Championship Playoffs
2	New Mexico United	15	8	3	4	23	17	+6	27	1.80	Advance to USL Championship Playoffs
3	Colorado Springs Switchbacks FC	16	2	7	7	19	28	−9	13	0.81	
4	Real Monarchs	16	3	2	11	14	25	−11	11	0.69	

Source: USL

==== Position by round ====
Round	1	2	3	4	5	6	7	8	9	10	11	12	13	14	15	16
Stadium	A	A	A	A	A	A	A	A	A	A	H	H	H	H	H	H
Result	L	W	D	W	W	L	W	W	W	D	L	W	L	-	D	W
Position	3	2	2	1	1	1	1	1	1	1	1	1	2	2	2	2

Updated to match(es) played on August 8, 2020. Source: Match reports
A = Away; H = Home; W = Win; D = Draw; L = Loss

==== Match results ====
On January 9, 2020, the USL announced the 2020 season schedule.

March 7 1	Austin Bold FC	1–0	New Mexico United	Austin, TX
6:30 PM MDT	Twumasi (yellow card) 37'; Lima 52' (pen.); Troncoso (yellow card) 77'; Báez (yellow card) 85'	Report	Najem (yellow card) 77'	Stadium: Bold Stadium; Attendance: 2,496; Referee: Malik Badawi

In the preparations for the resumption of league play following the shutdown prompted by the coronavirus pandemic, the remainder of United's schedule was announced on July 2.

July 11 2 Four Corners Cup	Colorado Springs Switchbacks	1–2	New Mexico United	Colorado Springs, CO
6:00 PM MDT	Daniels 45+2'	Report	Muhammad 25'; Wehan (yellow card) 56', (goal) 87'	Stadium: Weidner Field; Attendance: 1,000; Referee: Laura Rodriguez

July 15 3	El Paso Locomotive FC	2–2	New Mexico United	El Paso, TX
8:00 PM MDT	Rebellón (yellow card) 37'; Salgado (yellow card) 40', (goal) 43'; Fox 45+5'; Jérôme (yellow card) 84'; Mares (yellow card) 90+6'	Report	Wehan 11'; Tinari (yellow card) 49'; Parkes (yellow card) 53'; Sandoval 76' (pen.)	Stadium: Southwest University Park; Referee: Chris Ruska

July 24 4	El Paso Locomotive FC	1–2	New Mexico United	El Paso, TX
7:30 PM MDT	Beckie (yellow card) 69'; Gómez 86' (pen.), (yellow card) 87'; N'Toko (yellow card) 90+6'	Report	Wehan 35'; Sandoval 45+4'; Guzmán (yellow card) 76'; Mizell (yellow card) 87'	Stadium: Southwest University Park; Referee: Matthew Thompson

August 1 5	OKC Energy FC	0–3	New Mexico United	Oklahoma City, OK
6:00 PM MDT	Ibeagha (yellow card) 86'; Chavez (yellow card) 87'	Report	Moreno 31'; Wehan 45+3'; Mizell (yellow card) 82'; Ahlinvi 90+4'	Stadium: Taft Stadium; Attendance: 1,582; Referee: Matthew Corrigan

August 8 6 Four Corners Cup	Phoenix Rising FC	5–2	New Mexico United	Scottsdale, AZ
7:30 PM MST	Flemmings 17', 73', 86'; Dadashov 22'; Cochran 52'; Lambert (yellow card) 57'; Calistri (yellow card) 80'	Report	Parkes 5'; Guzmán (yellow card) 45+1'; Tinari 59'; Moreno (yellow card) 89'	Stadium: Casino Arizona Field; Referee: Lukasz Szpala

August 15 7 Four Corners Cup	Colorado Springs Switchbacks FC	0–1	New Mexico United	Colorado Springs, CO
3:00 PM MDT	Rubio (yellow card) 63'; Ferreira (yellow card) 90+4'	Report	Tinari (yellow card) 30'; Wehan 45'; Najem (yellow card) 66'; Ryden (yellow card) 90+1'	Stadium: Weidner Field; Attendance: 1,000; Referee: Malik Badawi

August 19 8 Four Corners Cup	Real Monarchs	0–2	New Mexico United	Sandy, UT
8:00 PM MDT	Powder (yellow card) 45+3'	Report	Ryden 38'; Muhammad (yellow card) 42'; Williams (yellow card) 42'; Moreno 68'	Stadium: Rio Tinto Stadium; Attendance: 465; Referee: Matthew Thompson

August 22 9 Four Corners Cup	Real Monarchs	1–2	New Mexico United	Sandy, UT
8:00 PM MDT	Sierakowski 53'	Report	Moreno 5', (yellow card) 45'; Tetteh (yellow card) 29'; Wehan 48'; Guzmán (yellow card) 55'; Ryden (yellow card) 87'	Stadium: Rio Tinto Stadium; Attendance: 570; Referee: Lukasz Szpala

August 29 10 Four Corners Cup	Colorado Springs Switchbacks	1–1	New Mexico United	Colorado Springs, CO
5:00 PM MDT	Lewis (yellow card) 54'; Daniels 59'	Report	Tinari (yellow card) 37'; Moreno 54' (pen.); Williams (yellow card) 65' (yellow-red card) 75'; Mizell (yellow card) 90+3'	Stadium: Weidner Field; Attendance: 1,000; Referee: Farhad Dadkho

September 5 11	El Paso Locomotive FC	3–2	New Mexico United	El Paso, TX
7:30 PM MDT	King 25', (yellow card) 40'; Yearwood 60' (o.g.); Fox (yellow card) 82'; Mares 88'; Beckie (yellow card) 90'	Report	Estrada 13', (yellow card) 44'; Sandoval 41', (yellow card) 52'; Muhammad (yellow card) 70'; Wehan (yellow card) 89'	Stadium: Southwest University Park; Attendance: 1,519; Referee: Malik Badawi

September 12 12 Four Corners Cup	Real Monarchs	0–2	New Mexico United	Herriman, Utah
12:00 PM MDT	Giménez (yellow card) 23'; Vázquez (yellow card) 54'; Moberg (yellow card) 66'	Report	Tinari (yellow card) 30'; Moreno 40', 65'; Guzmán (yellow card) 90+2'	Stadium: Zions Bank Stadium; Referee: Elvis Osmanovic

September 19 13 Four Corners Cup	New Mexico United	1–2	Colorado Springs Switchbacks FC	Albuquerque, NM
3:30 PM MDT	Sandoval 28'; Moreno (yellow card) 64'	Report	Volesky 45+1' (pen.), (yellow card) 45+2'; Ferreira 48'; Daniels (yellow card) 88'	Stadium: UNM Soccer Complex; Referee: Elton Garcia

September 23 14	New Mexico United	P–P	Rio Grande Valley FC Toros	Albuquerque, NM
TBA PM MDT				Stadium: UNM Soccer Complex
Note: Match postponed due to a positive COVID-19 test in the RGVFC organization.

September 26 15	New Mexico United	0–0	El Paso Locomotive FC	Albuquerque, NM
7:30 PM MDT	Borelli (yellow card) 28'; Rebellón (yellow card) 41'; Ryan (yellow card) 52'; Carrijó (yellow card) 68'	Report	Moreno (yellow card) 36'; Tetteh (yellow card) 88'	Stadium: UNM Soccer Complex; Attendance: 1,669; Referee: Ricardo Fierro

September 30 16 Four Corners Cup	Real Monarchs	0–1	New Mexico United	Herriman, Utah
7:30 PM MDT	Flores (yellow card) 17'; Moberg (yellow card) 23'; Ávila (yellow card) 29'; Jasso (yellow card) 62'	Report	Bruce (yellow card) 27'; Muhammad (yellow card) 38'; Ryden (yellow card) 46'; Ahlinvi 57'	Stadium: Zions Bank Stadium; Attendance: 396; Referee: Chris Ruska

==== USL Cup Playoffs ====
October 10 Conf. Quarterfinals	San Antonio FC	0–1	New Mexico United	San Antonio, Texas
7:00 PM MDT	Taintor (yellow card) 51'; PC (yellow card) 104'; Bailone (yellow card) 105+1'; Parano (yellow card) 115'	Report	Moreno (yellow card) 48'; Wehan 101', (yellow card) 105+2'; Mizell (yellow card) 103'; Suggs (yellow card) 104'; Tinari (yellow card) 105+3'; Guzmán (yellow card) 107'	Stadium: Toyota Field; Attendance: 2,175; Referee: Elijio Arreguin

October 17 Conf. Semifinals	El Paso Locomotive FC	1–1 (a.e.t.) (5–3 p)	New Mexico United	El Paso, Texas
7:30 PM MDT	Mares 30'; Borelli (yellow card) 50'; Gómez (yellow card) 52'; Diaz (yellow card) 112'	Report	Hamilton (yellow card) 38'; Moreno (yellow card) 53'; Parkes 90+5'	Stadium: Southwest University Park; Attendance: 1,659; Referee: Jon Freemon
	Penalties
	Borelli (penalty scored); Ross (penalty scored); Ryan (penalty scored); Robinson (penalty scored); Zola (penalty scored)		(penalty scored) Sandoval; (penalty scored) Wehan; (penalty scored) Ryden; (penalty missed) Parkes

=== Four Corners Cup ===
On June 24, the league announced the structure of its Return To Play format, separating the league into eight separate groups for regional competitions. Unfortunately, Phoenix was combined with the southern California clubs into Group B, while the other three cup competitors were combined with El Paso into Group C, making a full cup competition impossible for the year. Matches between Four Corners clubs are identified but no cup will be awarded in 2020.

== Statistics ==
As of October 18, 2020

=== Outfield players ===
#	Pos.	Name	GP	GS	Min.	Goals	Assists	A yellow rectangle, denoting the yellow penalty card shown to a player being cautioned	A red rectangle, denoting the red penalty card shown to a player being sent off
3	DF	(United States) Austin Yearwood	15	15	1409	0	0	0	0
4	DF	(United States) Sam Hamilton	14	10	1032	0	0	1	0
5	DF	(United States) Josh Suggs	14	12	1171	0	1	1	0
6	DF	(Afghanistan) David Najem	13	7	719	0	0	2	0
7	MF	(United States) Ryan Williams	14	2	326	0	0	1	1
8	MF	(Colombia) Juan Pablo Guzmán	15	14	1123	0	0	5	0
9	FW	(United States) Devon Sandoval	14	12	1113	4	1	1	0
10	FW	(United States) Amando Moreno	17	15	1236	6	4	6	0
14	MF	(United States) Chris Wehan	15	15	1319	7	5	3	0
15	DF	(Ghana) Rashid Tetteh	10	5	415	0	0	2	0
16	MF	(United States) Saalih Muhammad	14	9	825	1	1	3	0
17	DF	(United States) Justin Schmidt	1	1	90	0	0	0	0
19	FW	(United States) (Mexico) David Estrada	15	3	501	1	2	1	0
20	MF	(United States) Andrew Tinari	16	14	1194	1	0	5	0
22	DF	(United States) Kalen Ryden	17	17	1530	1	0	3	0
23	FW	(United States) Samson Sergi	6	0	71	0	0	0	0
25	MF	(England) Daniel Bruce	15	7	655	0	1	1	0
26	MF	(France) Joris Ahlinvi	6	2	186	2	0	0	0
27	FW	(Jamaica) Romeo Parkes	16	8	720	2	1	1	0
—	MF	(United States) Manny Padilla (Note: Player left the club before the conclusion of the 2020 season.)	2	2	180	0	0	0	0

=== Goalkeepers ===
#	Name	GP	GS	Min.	SV	GA	GAA	SO	A yellow rectangle, denoting the yellow penalty card shown to a player being cautioned	A red rectangle, denoting the red penalty card shown to a player being sent off
1	(United States) Cody Mizell	17	17	1530	32	18	1.059	7	4	0
18	(Germany) Philipp Beigl	0	0	0	0	0	—	0	0	0
