= 2019 New Mexico United season =

New Mexico United
2019 season
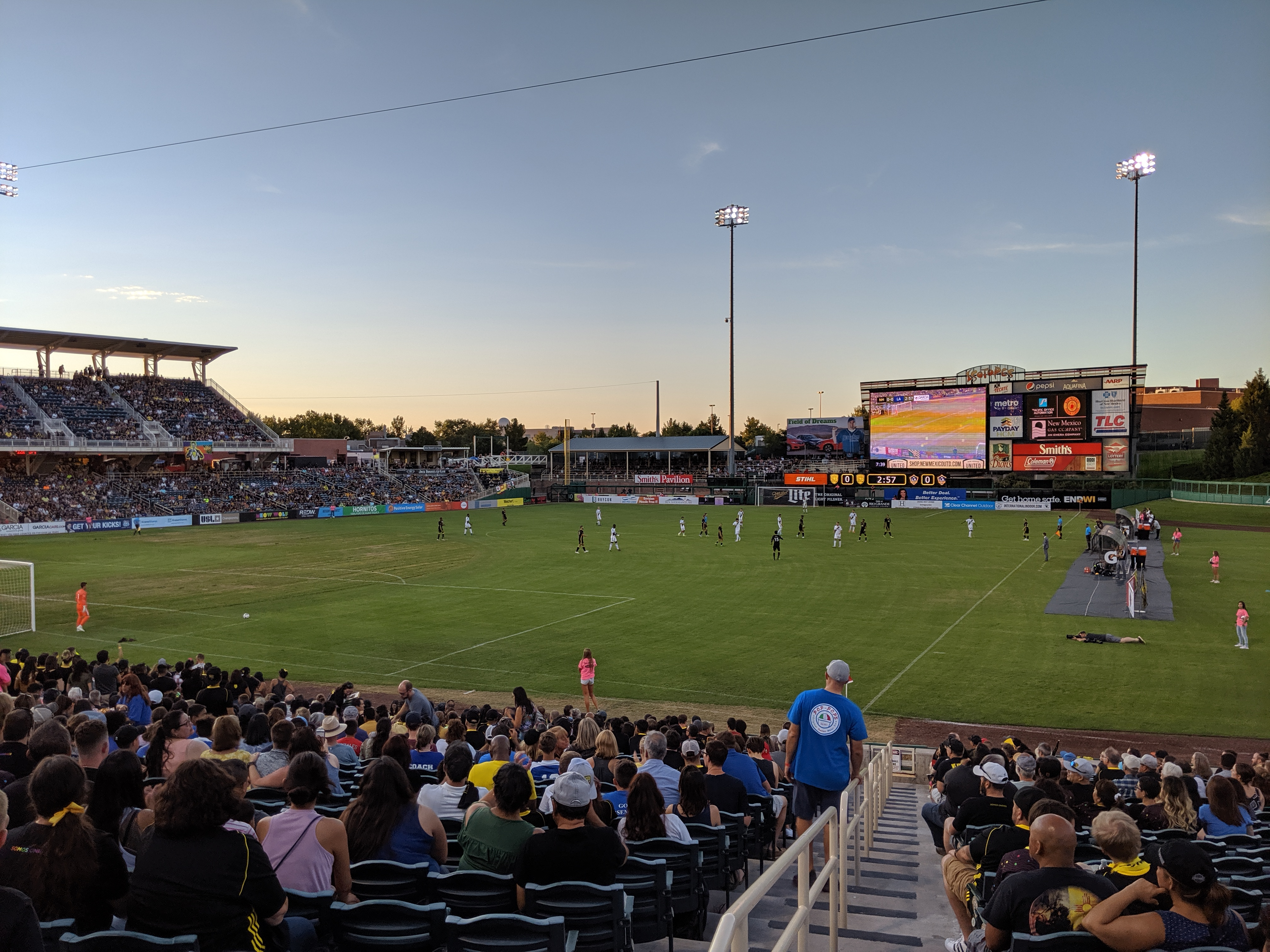
- Head coach: Troy Lesesne
- Stadium: Isotopes Park; Albuquerque, New Mexico
- USL: Conference: 10th
- USL Cup Playoffs: Play-In Round
- 2019 U.S. Open Cup: 2nd Round
- Four Corners Cup: 2nd
- Highest home attendance: League: 15,247 (August 17 vs. LA Galaxy II)
- Lowest home attendance: League: 8,330 (March 20 vs. Tulsa)
- Average home league attendance: League: 12,693
- Biggest win: 5–1 (April 13 vs. Real Monarchs)
- Biggest defeat: 1–6 (July 10 at Minnesota United FC, USOC QF); 0–5 (August 24 at San Antonio)
Home colours	Away colours

The 2019 New Mexico United season was the inaugural season for New Mexico United in the USL Championship, the second-tier professional soccer league in the United States and Canada.

== Club ==
=== Roster ===
No.	Position	Nation	Player
1	GK	USA	Cody Mizell
2	DF	RSA	Ethen Sampson
3	DF	USA	Austin Yearwood
4	MF	USA	Sam Hamilton
5	DF	USA	Josh Suggs
6	MF	ESP	Toni Soler
7	MF	USA	Ryan Williams
8	MF	COL	Juan Guzmán
9	FW	USA	Devon Sandoval
10	FW	JAM	Kevaughn Frater
11	FW	ESP	Santi Moar
12	GK	USA	Ben Beaury
14	MF	USA	Chris Wehan
15	DF	GHA	Rashid Tetteh
16	MF	USA	Saalih Muhammad
17	DF	USA	Justin Schmidt
19	FW	MEX	David Estrada
20	MF	USA	Josh Goss
23	MF	USA	Tommy Madden
24	DF	USA	Manny Padilla
25	MF	ENG	Daniel Bruce
26	MF	JPN	Kenny Akamatsu

== Competitions ==
=== Exhibition ===
February 9 Preseason	El Paso Locomotive FC	0–1	New Mexico United	El Paso, Texas
2:00 PM CST			(?)	Stadium: Westside Soccer Complex; Attendance: Closed-door

February 16 Preseason	New Mexico United	1–0	Denver Pioneers	Albuquerque, New Mexico
	Sandoval 82'	USL Report		Stadium: UNM Soccer Complex; Attendance: 1,215

February 24 Preseason	Sporting AZ FC	0–4	New Mexico United	Tucson, Arizona
		Report	Akamatsu; Frater, Sandoval	Stadium: Kino Sports Complex

February 27 Preseason	New Mexico United	3–1	OKC Energy FC	Tucson, Arizona
	Soler; Moar; Frater	Report	Eissele 60'	Stadium: Kino Sports Complex

March 1 Preseason	FC Tucson	–	New Mexico United	Tucson, Arizona
				Stadium: Kino Sports Complex
Note: Match result not publicized.

July 18 Midseason	New Mexico United (United States)	1–1	(Wales) Cardiff City	Albuquerque, New Mexico
7:45 pm	Akamatsu 3'	USL Report; CCFC Report	Bogle 63'	Stadium: UNM Soccer Complex; Attendance: 6,347

=== USL Championship ===
==== Standings ====
Pos	Team	Pld	W	D	L	GF	GA	GD	Pts	Qualification
8	Austin Bold FC	34	13	9	12	53	52	+1	48	Play-In Round
9	LA Galaxy II	34	12	12	10	59	62	−3	48	Play-In Round
10	New Mexico United	34	11	13	10	59	57	+2	46	Play-In Round
11	San Antonio FC	34	12	9	13	62	57	+5	45	
12	Rio Grande Valley Toros	34	11	8	15	50	58	−8	41	

Source: USL Championship Standings
Rules for classification: 1) total wins; 2) total goal differential; 3) total goals scored; 4) points earned against top four Conference finishers; 5) disciplinary points; 6) coin toss or drawing of lots

==== Match results ====
The 2019 USL Championship season schedule for the club was announced on December 19, 2018.

Win Draw Loss Upcoming fixture

Unless otherwise noted, all times in MST

March 9 1	New Mexico United	1–1	Fresno FC	Albuquerque, NM
7:30 PM	Sandoval 25', (yellow card) 61'	Report	Jackson 47'; Daly (yellow card) 75'	Stadium: Isotopes Park; Attendance: 12,896; Referee: Mark Allatin

March 16 2 Four Corners Cup	Phoenix Rising FC	3–3	New Mexico United	Tempe, AZ
8:30 PM	Pérez (yellow card) 11'; Asante 29' (pen.), (yellow card) 40', (goal) 48' (pen.); Jahn (yellow card) 35'; Johnson 71'	Report	Moar 16', (yellow card) 33', (goal) 55'; Estrada (yellow card) 24'; Mizell (yellow card) 28'; Frater 30', (yellow card) 72'; Williams (yellow card) 63'; Schmidt (yellow card) 81'	Stadium: Phoenix Rising FC Soccer Complex; Attendance: 6,607; Referee: Alejandro Mariscal

March 20 3	New Mexico United	2–1	Tulsa Roughnecks FC	Albuquerque, NM
7:00 PM	Sandoval 7'; Moar 20'; Padilla (yellow card) 33'; Mizell (yellow card) 84'; Muhammad (yellow card) 90+4'	Report	Hedrick (yellow card) 15'; Lobo 60'; Bastidas (yellow card) 83'	Stadium: Isotopes Park; Attendance: 8,330; Referee: Kevin Broadley

March 23 4	Orange County SC	2–2	New Mexico United	Irvine, CA
8:00 PM	Jones 59'; Crisostomo (yellow card) 63'; Leonardo 90+2'	Report	Moar 14'; Frater 33', (yellow card) 58'; Guzman (yellow card) 90+1'	Stadium: Championship Soccer Stadium; Attendance: 2,320; Referee: Gustavo Solorio

March 29 5	Tacoma Defiance	1–2	New Mexico United	Tacoma, WA
8:00 PM	Gonzalez 2'; Ndow (yellow card) 27'	Report	Frater (yellow card) 17', (goal) 77'; Moar (yellow card) 23'; Williams 37'	Stadium: Cheney Stadium; Attendance: 1,837; Referee: Dejan Susak

April 6 6	Rio Grande Valley FC Toros	0–0	New Mexico United	Edinburg, TX
7:30 PM	Cabezas (yellow card) 16'; Foster (yellow card) 40'; Salazar (yellow card) 54'; Samuels (yellow card) 71'	Report	Madden (yellow card) 89'	Stadium: H-E-B Park; Attendance: 3,496; Referee: Michael Radchuk

April 13 7 Four Corners Cup	New Mexico United	5–1	Real Monarchs	Albuquerque, NM
7:30 PM	Moar 24', 28', 40'; Frater 45+2'; Suggs (yellow card) 47'; Wehan 79'; Muhammad (yellow card) 90'	Report	Blake 16'; Heard (yellow card) 47'	Stadium: Isotopes Park; Attendance: 12,327; Referee: Ricardo Robledo-Grajeda

April 20 8	Reno 1868 FC	2–1	New Mexico United	Reno, NV
7:00 PM	Rivas 28', (yellow card) 53'; Lacroix 89'	Report	Suggs 39'; Padilla (yellow card) 48'; Moar (yellow card) 67'	Stadium: Greater Nevada Field; Attendance: 3,656; Referee: Victor Rivas

April 26 9	New Mexico United	3–3	Portland Timbers 2	Albuquerque, NM
8:30 PM	Suggs (yellow card) 34'; Frater (yellow card) 35', (goal) 50', 54' (pen.), 90+3'	Report	Ornstil (yellow card) 42'; Williamson 66', 77' (pen.); Sierakowski 68'; Wharton (yellow card) 69'; Leeker (yellow card) 85'	Stadium: Isotopes Park; Attendance: 12,921; Referee: Alejandro Aguilera, Jr.

May 5 10	New Mexico United	3–0	San Antonio FC	Albuquerque, NM
5:00 p.m. CDT	Sandoval 9'; Wehan 59', 63'; Guzman (yellow card) 90+4'	Report	Hernández (yellow card) 45+2'; Ackon (yellow card) 86'	Stadium: Isotopes Park; Attendance: 15,023; Referee: Thomas Snyder

May 12 11	El Paso Locomotive FC	2–2	New Mexico United	El Paso, TX
6:00 PM	Rezende (yellow card) 28'; Kiesewetter 36', 65'; Contreras (yellow card) 45+1'; Monsalvez (red card) 72'	Report	Hamilton 45+2'; Williams (yellow card) 69', (goal) 79'; Moar (red card) 72'; Suggs (yellow card) 73'	Stadium: Southwest University Park; Attendance: 5,276; Referee: Gustavo Solorio

May 18 12 Four Corners Cup	Colorado Springs Switchbacks FC	1–3	New Mexico United	Colorado Springs, CO
6:00 PM	Molano (yellow card) 24'; Reaves (yellow card) 38'; Seth 63'	Report	Frater 18', 36', 75', (yellow card) 88'; Guzman (yellow card) 90'	Stadium: Weidner Field; Attendance: 4,151; Referee: Farhad Dadkho

May 25 13	Austin Bold FC	1–3	New Mexico United	Austin, TX
6:30 PM	Isaac 55'; Garcia (red card) 72'; Okugo (yellow card) 84'	Report	Okugo 29' (o.g.), (yellow card) 84'; Moar (yellow card) 40', (goal) 62', 88'; Tetteh (yellow card) 75'; Williams (yellow card) 90+3'	Stadium: Bold Stadium; Attendance: 2,907; Referee: Matthew Franz

June 5 14	New Mexico United	1–1	OKC Energy FC	Albuquerque, NM
8:00 PM CDT	Sandoval 43'; Frater (yellow card) 62'	Report	Bosetti (yellow card) 49'; Brown 73'	Stadium: Isotopes Park; Attendance: 13,574; Referee: Ismir Pekmic

June 8 15	New Mexico United	0–3	Sacramento Republic FC	Albuquerque, NM
7:30 PM	Frater (yellow card) 35'; Padilla (yellow card) 60'; Guzman (yellow card) 61'	Report	Iwasa 32' (pen.), 90'; Mahoney 77'; Saari (yellow card) 85'	Stadium: Isotopes Park; Attendance: 14,780; Referee: Elvis Osmanovic

June 15 16	Las Vegas Lights FC	5–1	New Mexico United	Las Vegas, NV
8:30 PM	Torre 32', (yellow card) 33'; Hernández 40'; Garcia-Lopez (yellow card) 45'; Tabortetaka 47'; Robinson (yellow card) 69'; Rivas 90'; Sandoval 90+4'	Report	Tetteh (yellow card) 39'; Estrada 88'	Stadium: Cashman Field; Attendance: 7,882; Referee: Farhad Dadkho

June 22 17	LA Galaxy II	1–1	New Mexico United	Carson, CA
8:00 PM	Hilliard-Arce (yellow card) 20'; Fiddes (yellow card) 24'; DePuy 32'; López (yellow card) 45+2'	Report	Wehan (yellow card) 4'; Hamilton (yellow card) 35'; Frater 40'; Sampson (yellow card) 54'	Stadium: Dignity Health Sports Park; Attendance: 1,310; Referee: Mark Allatin

July 6 18	Real Monarchs	1–0	New Mexico United	Herriman, UT
8:00 P.M.	Plewa (yellow card) 23'; Chang 59' (pen.); Ávila (yellow card) 73'; Ryden (yellow card) 90+7'	Report	Wehan (yellow card) 26'; Suggs (yellow card) 66'; Frater (yellow card) 66'; Guzmán (red card) 90+4'	Stadium: Zions Bank Stadium; Attendance: 2,159; Referee: Dejan Susak

July 13 19	Fresno FC	2–1	New Mexico United	Fresno, CA
8:30 PM	Johnson 18' (pen.); Caffa (yellow card) 45'; Daly 48'	Report	Schmidt 40'	Stadium: Chukchansi Park; Attendance: 4,029; Referee: Matthew Thompson

July 24 20	Sacramento Republic FC	1–2	New Mexico United	Sacramento, CA
8:00 PM	Iwasa (yellow card) 53'; Taintor (yellow card) 66'; Werner 75'	Report	Wehan 10'; Moar (yellow card) 36'; Sandoval (yellow card) 44'; Bruce 89'	Stadium: Papa Murphy's Park; Attendance: 10,523; Referee: Elijio Arreguin

July 31 21	New Mexico United	3–0	El Paso Locomotive FC	Albuquerque, NM
7:00 PM	Frater 38' (pen.); Wehan 71', 75'; Madden (yellow card) 86'	Report	Herrera (yellow card) 41'; Ryan (yellow card) 49'; Beckie (yellow card) 56'	Stadium: Isotopes Park; Attendance: 13,521; Referee: Elton García

August 3 22	New Mexico United	2–2	Austin Bold FC	Albuquerque, NM
8:30 PM	Bruce 5'; Williams (yellow card) 38'; Frater 48'	Report	Okugo (yellow card) 11', (goal) 31', 67'; McFarlane (yellow card) 70'; Promise (yellow card) 72'; Faris (yellow card) 85'; Phillips (yellow card) 90+3'	Stadium: Isotopes Park; Attendance: 14,327; Referee: Michael Radchuk

August 11 23	Portland Timbers 2	3–2	New Mexico United	Portland, OR
6:00 PM	Langsdorf 3'; Williamson (yellow card) 43'; Sierakowski 58'; Wharton 74' (pen.)	Report	Padilla (yellow card) 14' (yellow-red card) 84'; Suggs (yellow card) 19'; Frater (yellow card) 66'; Moar 72'; Schmidt (yellow card) 77'; Bruce (yellow card) 90+3'	Stadium: Providence Park; Attendance: 2,316; Referee: Greg Dopka

August 17 24	New Mexico United	2–2	LA Galaxy II	Albuquerque, NM
19:30	Wehan 25'; Frater (yellow card) 55', (goal) 77' (pen.); Soler (yellow card) 73'; Sandoval (yellow card) 85'	Report	Kamara 9'; Saldana (yellow card) 25' (yellow-red card) 41'; José Hernández (yellow card) 51'; Vera (yellow card) 71'; Williams 74' (pen.)	Stadium: Isotopes Park; Attendance: 15,247; Referee: Lukasz Szpala

August 24 25	San Antonio FC	5–0	New Mexico United	San Antonio, TX
6:30 PM	Parano 28', 90'; Yaro (yellow card) 36'; Gómez 39'; Greene (yellow card) 42'; López 56'; Restrepo 66'	Report	Muhammad (red card) 21'; Guzmán (yellow card) 67'	Stadium: Toyota Field; Attendance: 6,057; Referee: Jon Freemon

September 1 26	New Mexico United	0–2	Orange County SC	Albuquerque, NM
19:30	Suggs (yellow card) 46'	Report	Orozco (yellow card) 35'; Forrester (yellow card) 43' van Ewijk 52'; Seaton 55'; Quinn (yellow card) 76'; Arellano (yellow card) 81'	Stadium: Isotopes Park; Attendance: 12,873; Referee: Luis Guardia

September 8 27	OKC Energy	1–3	New Mexico United	Oklahoma City, OK
5:00 PM	Williams (yellow card) 15'; Brown 57'; Harris (yellow card) 86'; R. Garcia (yellow card) 86'	Report	Sandoval 11', 16' (pen.); Tetteh (yellow card) 21'; Guzman (yellow card) 45'; Wehan 71'; Suggs (yellow card) 72'	Stadium: Taft Stadium; Attendance: 4,293; Referee: Mark Allatin

September 14 28	New Mexico United	3–1	Colorado Springs Switchbacks FC	Albuquerque, NM
7:30 PM	Sandoval 8', (yellow card) 47', (goal) 47', 66'; Moar (yellow card) 26'; Hamilton (yellow card) 36'	Report	Romero (yellow card) 32'; Reaves (yellow card) 51'; Burt 78'; Jome (yellow card) 87'	Stadium: Isotopes Park; Attendance: 12,122; Referee: Farhad Dadkho

September 20 29	New Mexico United	1–3	Reno 1868 FC	Albuquerque, NM
7:30 PM	Moar 7', (yellow card) 83'; Wehan (yellow card) 27'	Report	Hertzog 45', 55'; Richards 54'; Galindo (yellow card) 67'; Partida (yellow card) 75' (yellow-red card) 80'; Lacroix (yellow card) 88'	Stadium: Isotopes Park; Attendance: 10,518; Referee: Matthew Franz

September 28 30	New Mexico United	2–2	Phoenix Rising FC	Albuquerque, NM
7:30 PM	Sandoval 4'; Frater (yellow card) 41'; Hamilton (yellow card) 48'; Schmidt 53'; Padilla (yellow card) 58'; Guzmán (yellow card) 68'	Report	Jahn (yellow card) 13'; Calistri 74', 90'	Stadium: Isotopes Park; Attendance: 13,009; Referee: Michael Radchuk

October 5 31	New Mexico United	1–1	Rio Grande Valley FC Toros	Albuquerque, NM
8:30 PM	Hamilton 44'; Moar (yellow card) 55'; Muhammad (yellow card) 65'	Report	Junqua (yellow card) 26'; Small 40' (pen.); Rodriguez (yellow card) 45+3'	Stadium: Isotopes Park; Attendance: 11,196; Referee: Matthew Thompson

October 12 32	Tulsa Roughnecks FC	2–1	New Mexico United	Tulsa, OK
6:00 PM	Uzo 10'; Marlon (yellow card) 48' (yellow-red card) 73'; Boakye-Mensa (yellow card) 53'; Lobo (yellow card) 89'; Silva 90+6'	Report	Suggs (yellow card) 37'; Sandoval 68'; Moar (yellow card) 86'	Stadium: Oneok Field; Attendance: 1,353; Referee: Lukasz Szpala

October 16 33	New Mexico United	1–1	Tacoma Defiance	Albuquerque, NM
7:00 PM	Wehan 8'; Frater (yellow card) 63'	Report	Gonzalez 7'; Rubio (yellow card) 88'	Stadium: Isotopes Park; Attendance: 9,323; Referee: Yusri Rudolf

October 19 34	New Mexico United	2–0	Las Vegas Lights FC	Albuquerque, NM
7:00 PM	Wehan 37'; Tetteh (yellow card) 75'; Hamilton (yellow card) 77'; Sandoval 87'	Report	Torre (yellow card) 58'; Torres (yellow card) 81'	Stadium: Isotopes Park; Attendance: 13,788; Referee: Rosendo Mendoza

==== USL Cup Playoffs ====
23 October Play-In Round	Sacramento Republic FC	2–1	New Mexico United	Sacramento, CA
8:30 PM	Enevoldsen (yellow card) 44', (goal) 82'; Alemán 45+3'; Villarreal (yellow card) 67'; Werner (yellow card) 90+3'	Report	Sandoval 1'; Padilla (yellow card) 44'; Wehan (yellow card) 64'; Guzmán (yellow card) 69'; Schmidt (yellow card) 90'	Stadium: Papa Murphy's Park; Attendance: 9,907; Referee: Elton Garcia

=== U.S. Open Cup ===
As a member of the USL Championship, New Mexico United will enter the tournament in the Second Round, to be played May 14–15, 2019

May 15 Second round	Phoenix Rising FC (Arizona)	2–2 (a.e.t.) (3–4 p)	New Mexico United	Scottsdale, Arizona
7:30 PM MST	Flemmings 65' (pen.); Musa (yellow card) 80'; Jahn 101'	Report	Muhammad (yellow card) 28'; Frater (yellow card) 44'; Sandoval 79', 95'; Moar (yellow card) 90+3'	Stadium: Casino Arizona Field; Referee: Dejan Susak
	Penalties
	Jahn (penalty scored); Asante (penalty scored); Dia (penalty missed); Spencer (penalty scored); Cochran (penalty missed)		(penalty scored) Wehan; (penalty scored) Moar; (penalty scored) Sandoval; (penalty missed) Suggs; (penalty scored) Schmidt

May 29 Third round	Colorado Springs Switchbacks FC	1–2 (a.e.t.)	New Mexico United	Colorado Springs, Colorado
7:00 pm MDT	Burt 52'; Reaves (yellow card) 73'; Donsu (yellow card) 90+3'; Argueta (red card) 93'	Report	Frater (yellow card) 68', (goal) 95' (pen.); Wehan 87'	Stadium: Weidner Field; Attendance: 349; Referee: Karen Abt

June 12 Fourth round	Colorado Rapids	2–2 (a.e.t.) (2–4 p)	New Mexico United	Commerce City, Colorado
7:00 PM MDT	Sjöberg (yellow card) 24' (yellow-red card) 72'; Rubio 35'; Blomberg (yellow card) 43'; Rosenberry (yellow card) 44'; Mezquida 46'; Acosta (yellow card) 88'; Wilson (yellow card) 89'	Report	Sandoval 3'; Hamilton (yellow card) 34'; Sampson (yellow card) 38'; Wehan (yellow card) 45'; Frater 90+4'; Moar (yellow card) 92'; Guzman (yellow card) 103'	Stadium: Dick's Sporting Goods Park; Attendance: 2,619; Referee: Malik Badawi
	Penalties
	Acosta (penalty scored); Wilson (penalty missed); Rosenberry (penalty scored); Nicholson (penalty missed)		(penalty scored) Frater; (penalty scored) Moar; (penalty scored) Sandoval; (penalty scored) Wehan

June 19 Round of 16	FC Dallas (Texas)	1–2	New Mexico United	Dallas, Texas
6:00 PM	Servania 41'; Cerrillo (yellow card) 90+1'; Bressan (yellow card) 90+7'	Report	Frater 45', (yellow card) 59'; Hamilton 64'; Yearwood (yellow card) 68'; Mizell (yellow card) 90+2'; Padilla (yellow card) 90+3'	Stadium: Westcott Field; Attendance: 1,424; Referee: Jon Freemon

July 10 Quarter-final	Minnesota United FC	6–1	New Mexico United	Saint Paul, Minnesota
6:00 p.m. CDT	Rodríguez 10', 18', 45'; Quintero 16'; Greguš 23'; Ibarra 62'	Report	Moar 7'; Wehan (yellow card) 54'	Stadium: Allianz Field; Referee: Ramy Touchan
