= Ahlinvi =

Ahlinvi is a surname. Notable people with the surname include:

- Joris Ahlinvi (born 1995), French footballer
- Mattéo Ahlinvi (born 1999), French footballer
