= Sam Hamilton (soccer) =

American soccer player

Personal information
- Date of birth: July 26, 1995 (age 31)
- Place of birth: Denver, Colorado, United States
- Height: 6 ft 0 in (1.83 m)
- Positions: Defender; defensive midfielder

College career
Years	Team	Apps	(Gls)
2013–2016	Denver Pioneers	83	(3)

Senior career*
Years	Team	Apps	(Gls)
2017–2018	Colorado Rapids	3	(0)
2017	→ Colorado Springs Switchbacks (loan)	0	(0)
2017	→ Phoenix Rising (loan)	13	(1)
2018	→ Colorado Springs Switchbacks (loan)	18	(0)
2019–2023	New Mexico United	114	(3)
- * Club domestic league appearances and goals as of October 22, 2023

Sam Hamilton (born July 26, 1995) is an American former professional soccer player.

== Career ==
=== College ===
Hamilton played four years of college soccer at the University of Denver between 2013 and 2016, where he made 83 appearances, scored 3 goals and tallied 13 assists.

=== Club ===
On January 13, 2017, Hamilton was selected in the first round (15th overall) of the 2017 MLS SuperDraft by Colorado Rapids. He signed with the club on March 4, 2017.

Hamilton made three league appearances in MLS with Colorado Rapids, and spent the rest of his rookie season on loan with Phoenix Rising. He made 9 starts in 14 appearances with Phoenix, scoring his first professional goal against Charlotte Independence September 16, 2017.

On August 10, 2017, Hamilton was loaned to United Soccer League side Phoenix Rising FC.

On November 28, 2018, he signed with New Mexico United of the USL Championship, following his release by Colorado Rapids.

In New Mexico United's inaugural season, Hamilton made 16 starts in 20 league appearances at center back and central midfield, helping lead the team to its first-ever playoff appearance.

In U.S. Open Cup play, Hamilton contributed to two upset victories over MLS opposition. On June 12, he played a full 120 minutes against his former club Colorado Rapids in a shootout victory. In the following Round of 16 on June 19, Hamilton scored the game-winning goal in the 64th minute to upset MLS side FC Dallas and advance to the tournament's quarterfinals.

== Career statistics ==
As of match played April 23, 2022

Appearances by club, season, and competition
Club	Season	League			Domestic Cup		League Cup		Continental Cup		Total	
Club	Season	Division	Apps	Goals	Apps	Goals	Apps	Goals	Apps	Goals	Apps	Goals
Colorado Rapids	2017	MLS	3	0	2 (Note: Appearance(s) in the US Open Cup)	0	—		—		5	0
Colorado Rapids	2018	MLS	0	0	0	0	—		0 (Note: Club participated in the 2018 CONCACAF Champions League)	0	0	0
Colorado Rapids	Total		3	0	2	0	—		0	0	5	0
Phoenix Rising (loan)	2017	USL	13	1	0	0	1 (Note: Appearances in USL Cup playoffs)	0	—		14	1
Colorado Springs Switchbacks (loan)	2018	USL	18	0	0	0	—		—		18	0
New Mexico United	2019	USL Championship	19	2	4	1	1 (Note: Appearance(s) in USL Championship playoffs)	0	—		24	3
New Mexico United	2020	USL Championship	12	0	—		2	0	—		14	0
New Mexico United	2021	USL Championship	11	0	—		—		—		11	0
New Mexico United	2022	USL Championship	6	0	2	0	—		—		8	0
New Mexico United	Total		48	2	6	1	3	0	—		57	3
Career total			82	3	8	1	4	0	0	0	94	4
