= Rashid Tetteh =

Ghanaian footballer (born 1995)

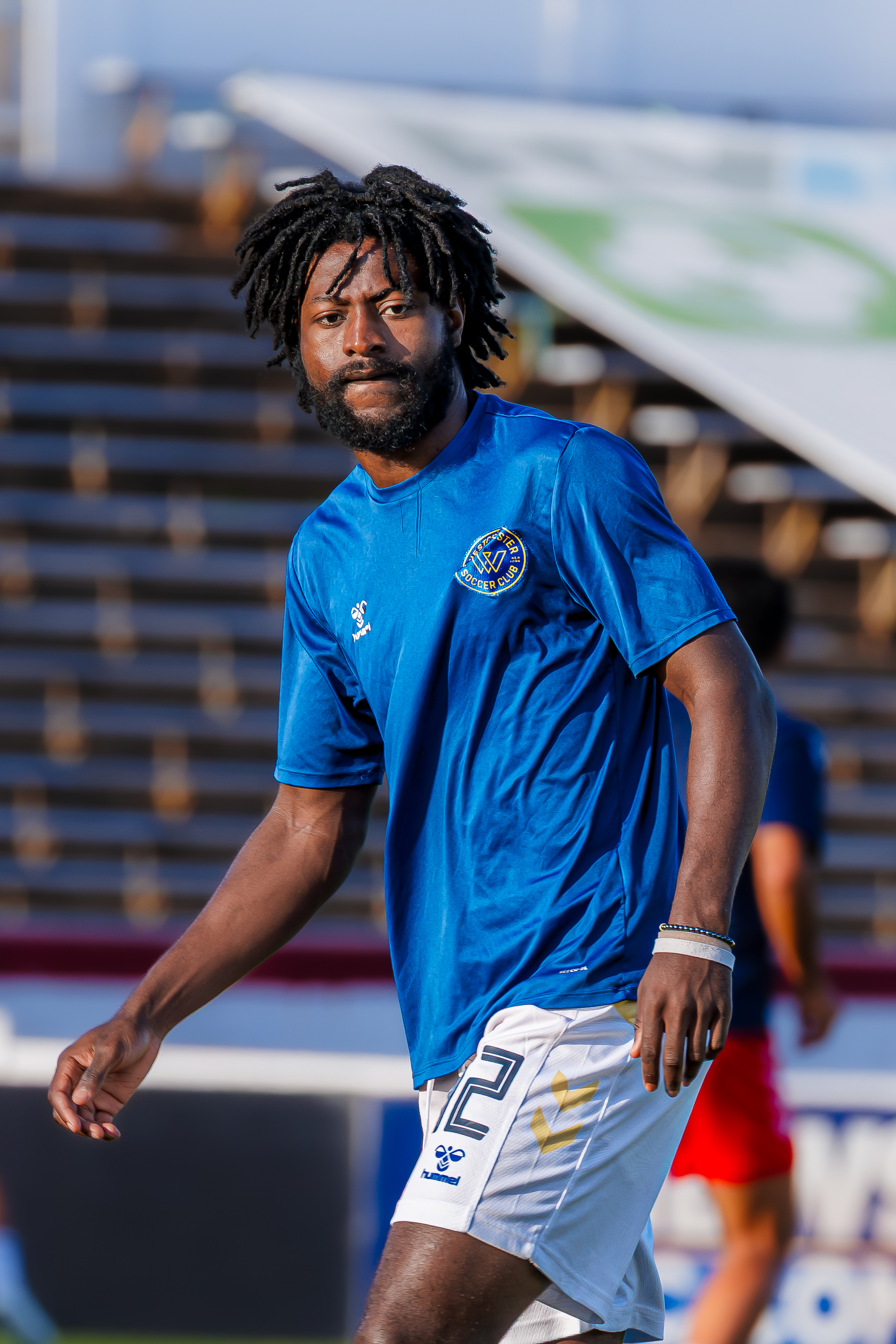
- Tetteh with Westchester SC

Personal information
- Date of birth: 14 July 1995 (age 31)
- Place of birth: Accra, Ghana
- Height: 1.83 m (6 ft 0 in)
- Position: Central defender

Team information
- Current team: Carolina Core FC
- Number: 77

College career
| Years | Team | Apps | (Gls) |
| 2015–2018 | High Point Panthers | 69 | (0) |

Senior career*
| Years | Team | Apps | (Gls) |
| 2016–2017 | Carolina Dynamo | 19 | (0) |
| 2018 | Des Moines Menace | 4 | (0) |
| 2019–2022 | New Mexico United | 83 | (0) |
| 2023–2024 | FC Tulsa | 49 | (0) |
| 2025–2026 | Westchester SC | 23 | (1) |
| 2026– | Carolina Core FC | 8 | (0) |
- * Club domestic league appearances and goals as of November 1, 2026

Rashid Tetteh (born 14 July 1995) is a Ghanaian footballer who plays as a central defender for Carlina Core in MLS Next Pro.

Tetteh joined USL League One expansion club Westchester SC in January 2025.

== Career statistics ==
As of match played April 23, 2022

| Club | Season | League | | | Cup | | League Cup | | Total | |
| Club | Season | Division | Apps | Goals | Apps | Goals | Apps | Goals | Apps | Goals |
|---|---|---|---|---|---|---|---|---|---|---|
| Carolina Dynamo | 2016 | USL PDL | 6 | 0 | 0 | 0 | 2 (Note: Appearance(s) in PDL playoffs) | 0 | 8 | 0 |
| Carolina Dynamo | 2017 | USL PDL | 13 | 0 | 1 (Note: Appearance(s) in the US Open Cup) | 0 | – | | 14 | 0 |
| Carolina Dynamo | Total | | 19 | 0 | 1 | 0 | 2 | 0 | 22 | 0 |
| Des Moines Menace | 2018 | USL PDL | 4 | 0 | – | | 1 | 0 | 5 | 0 |
| New Mexico United | 2019 | USL Championship | 29 | 0 | 3 | 0 | 1 (Note: Appearance(s) in USL Championship playoffs) | 0 | 33 | 0 |
| New Mexico United | 2020 | USL Championship | 10 | 0 | – | | 0 | 0 | 10 | 0 |
| New Mexico United | 2021 | USL Championship | 21 | 0 | – | | – | | 21 | 0 |
| New Mexico United | 2022 | USL Championship | 4 | 0 | 1 | 0 | – | | 5 | 0 |
| New Mexico United | Total | | 64 | 0 | 4 | 0 | 1 | 0 | 69 | 0 |
| Career total | | | 87 | 0 | 5 | 0 | 4 | 0 | 96 | 0 |
