= Saalih Muhammad =

American soccer player

Personal information
- Full name: Saalih Ghana Muhammad
- Date of birth: August 25, 1995 (age 31)
- Place of birth: Richmond, California, United States
- Height: 1.83 m (6 ft 0 in)
- Position: Defensive midfielder

Youth career
- 2011–2014: Dinamo Zagreb
- 2014: Portland Timbers

Senior career*
| Years | Team | Apps | (Gls) |
| 2015–2016 | HAŠK | 0 | (0) |
| 2016 | Croatia Đakovo | 0 | (0) |
| 2017 | San Francisco Deltas | 0 | (0) |
| 2018 | Penn FC | 14 | (0) |
| 2019–2020 | New Mexico United | 34 | (1) |
| 2021 | Oakland Roots | 6 | (0) |
| 2021 | → New Mexico United (loan) | 9 | (1) |
- * Club domestic league appearances and goals as of October 9, 2021

Saalih Ghana Muhammad (born August 25, 1995) is an American former soccer player who played as a defensive midfielder.

== Career ==
After time in the academy teams of Dinamo Zagreb and Portland Timbers, Muhammad returned to Croatia and spent time with the first-teams of HAŠK and Croatia Đakovo, appearing in cup competitions for both. Muhammad came back to the United States again when he signed for North American Soccer League side San Francisco Deltas on February 15, 2017. However, he missed the entirety of the 2017 season after tearing his Achilles tendon in March. On March 15, 2018, Muhammad signed for United Soccer League club Penn FC. On February 21, 2019, Muhammad joined USL side New Mexico United.

On November 24, 2020, Muhammad joined Oakland Roots ahead of their inaugural season in then USL Championship in 2021.

== Personal life ==
Born in the United States, Muhammad is of Ghanaian descent.

Muhammad began operating Oko Agriculture after retiring from football. Oko is an urban farm project operated in conjunction with the non-profit Rio Grande Community Farm.

Saalih is married to Elizabeth Muhammad of Albuquerque NM. They share a daughter, the beautiful Atallah Muhammad.

== Career statistics ==
As of match played November 8, 2021

| Club | Season | League | | | Cup | | League Cup | | Total | |
| Club | Season | Division | Apps | Goals | Apps | Goals | Apps | Goals | Apps | Goals |
|---|---|---|---|---|---|---|---|---|---|---|
| NK HAŠK | 2015/16 | Treća HNL | 0 | 0 | 1 (Note: Appearance(s) in Croatian Football Cup) | 0 | — | | 1 | 0 |
| San Francisco Deltas | 2017 | NASL | 0 | 0 | 0 | 0 | 0 | 0 | 0 | 0 |
| Penn FC | 2018 | USL | 14 | 0 | 2 | 0 | — | | 14 | 0 |
| New Mexico United | 2019 | USL Championship | 22 | 0 | 5 (Note: Appearance(s) in the US Open Cup) | 0 | 1 (Note: Appearance(s) in USL Championship playoffs) | 0 | 22 | 0 |
| New Mexico United | 2020 | USL Championship | 12 | 1 | — | | 2 | 0 | 14 | 1 |
| New Mexico United | Total | | 34 | 1 | 5 | 0 | 3 | 0 | 36 | 1 |
| Oakland Roots | 2021 | USL Championship | 6 | 0 | — | | — | | 6 | 0 |
| New Mexico United (loan) | 2021 | USL Championship | 9 | 1 | — | | — | | 9 | 1 |
| Career total | | | 63 | 2 | 8 | 0 | 3 | 0 | 74 | 2 |
