= Chris Wehan =

American soccer player (born 1994)

Personal information
- Full name: Christopher Wehan
- Date of birth: January 29, 1994 (age 32)
- Place of birth: Orange, California, United States
- Height: 1.74 m (5 ft 9 in)
- Positions: Attacking midfielder; winger

College career
Years	Team	Apps	(Gls)
2012–2016	New Mexico Lobos	80	(31)

Senior career*
Years	Team	Apps	(Gls)
2013	OC Blues Strikers	2	(0)
2014	Seattle Sounders FC U-23	8	(1)
2017	Reno 1868	29	(8)
2018	San Jose Earthquakes	6	(0)
2018	→ Reno 1868 (loan)	14	(4)
2019–2020	New Mexico United	42	(16)
2021	Orange County SC	16	(4)
2021–2024	New Mexico United	49	(19)
- * Club domestic league appearances and goals as of July 11, 2024

Christopher Wehan (born January 29, 1994) is an American former professional soccer player who played as an attacking midfielder.

== Career ==
=== Amateur and college ===
Wehan spent five years playing college soccer at the University of New Mexico between 2012 and 2016, including a redshirt year in 2012, where in total he scored 31 goals in 80 appearances.

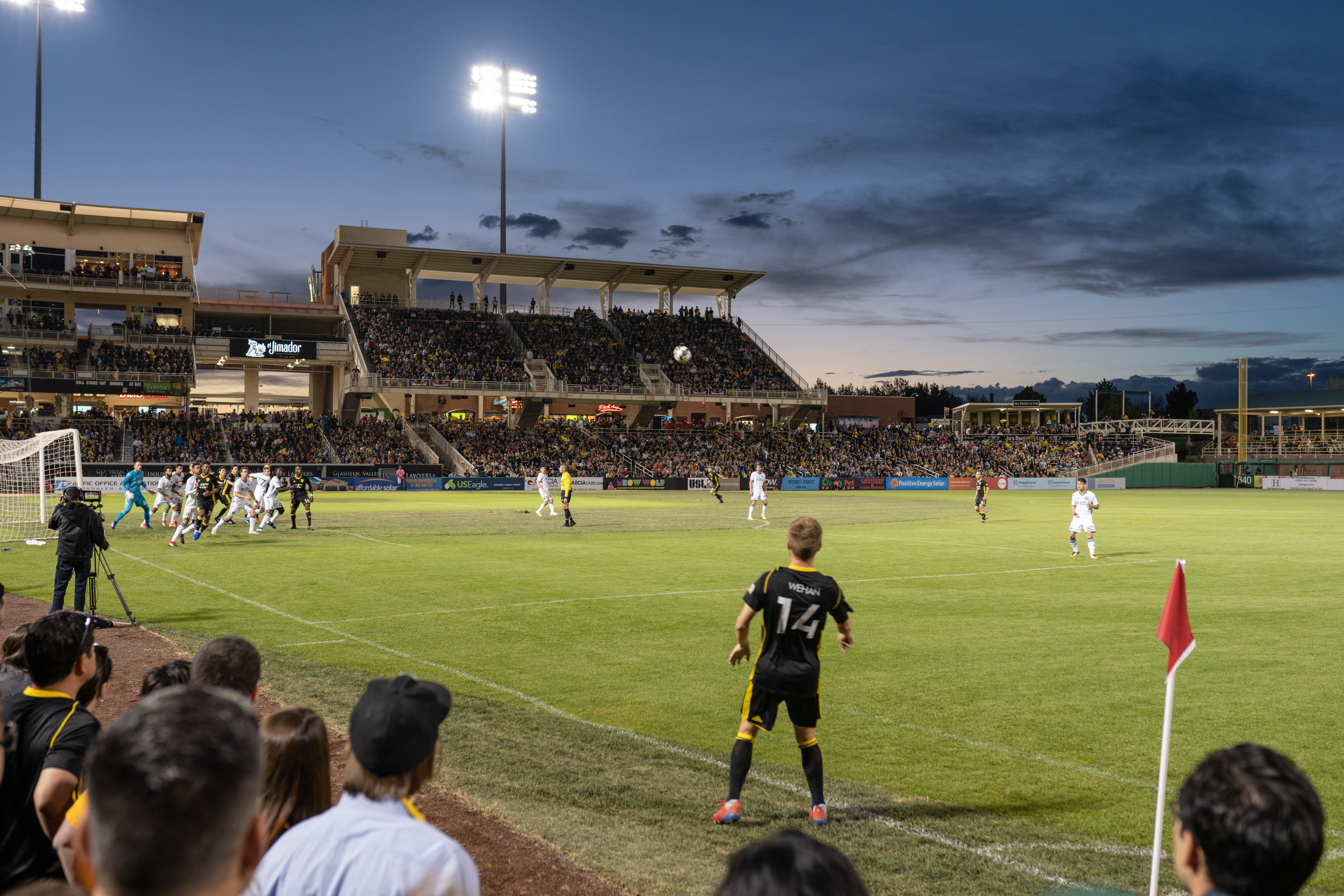
Chris Wehan sends in a corner kick vs. Portland Timbers 2 on April 26, 2019

Wehan also appeared for USL PDL sides OC Blues Strikers and Seattle Sounders FC U-23.

=== Professional ===
On March 8, 2017, Wehan signed with United Soccer League club Reno 1868 FC as part of their inaugural roster. He was integral to Reno's record breaking attack, notching twelve assists which tied Matthew Dallman's single season USL record. On November 21, 2017, Wehan was named the USL Rookie of the Year.

Reno's MLS affiliate San Jose Earthquakes signed Wehan on December 14, 2017, along with Reno teammates Jimmy Ockford and Luis Felipe Fernandes. He was then temporarily loaned back to Reno, playing his first game back in Reno's 3–4 loss to Swope Park Rangers on March 17, 2018, and tallying a goal.

Wehan was released by San Jose at the end of their 2018 season.

On February 14, 2019, Wehan signed with New Mexico United ahead of their inaugural season in the USL Championship.

On November 6, 2020, Wehan joined USL Championship side Orange County SC ahead of their 2021 season.

On August 17, 2021, Wehan transferred from Orange County SC back to New Mexico United. He signed an extension that will keep him with New Mexico United through 2023. Though the fee was undisclosed, it was believed to be the largest intra-USL transfer in league history.

Following the 2022 season, Wehan was named New Mexico United's Offensive Player of the Year.

On February 19, 2024, it was announced Wehan would leave New Mexico to focus on recovery from an injury setback.

On January 30, 2025, Wehan announced his retirement from professional soccer.

== Personal life ==
Chris's brother, Charlie, is also a professional soccer player.

== Career statistics ==
As of match played July 11, 2024

Appearances and goals by club, season and competition
Club	Season	League			National cup		League cup		Total	
Club	Season	Division	Apps	Goals	Apps	Goals	Apps	Goals	Apps	Goals
Seattle Sounders U-23	2014	USL PDL	8	1	—		—		8	1
Reno 1868	2017	USL Championship	29	8	1 (Note: Appearance(s) in the US Open Cup)	0	1 (Note: Appearance(s) in USL playoffs)	0	31	8
San Jose Earthquakes	2018	MLS	6	0	0	0	—		6	0
Reno 1868 (loan)	2018	USL	12	4	0	0	2	0	14	4
New Mexico United	2019	USL Championship	30	10	5	1	1	0	36	11
New Mexico United	2020	USL Championship	13	6	—		2	1	15	7
New Mexico United	Total		43	16	5	1	3	1	51	18
Orange County SC	2021	USL Championship	16	4	—		—		16	4
New Mexico United	2021	USL Championship	15	10	—		—		15	10
New Mexico United	2022	USL Championship	28	7	2	1	—		30	8
New Mexico United	2023	USL Championship	6	2	1	0			7	2
New Mexico United	Total		49	19	2	1	0	0	52	20
Career total			142	52	8	2	6	1	156	55
