= Justin Schmidt (soccer) =

American soccer player

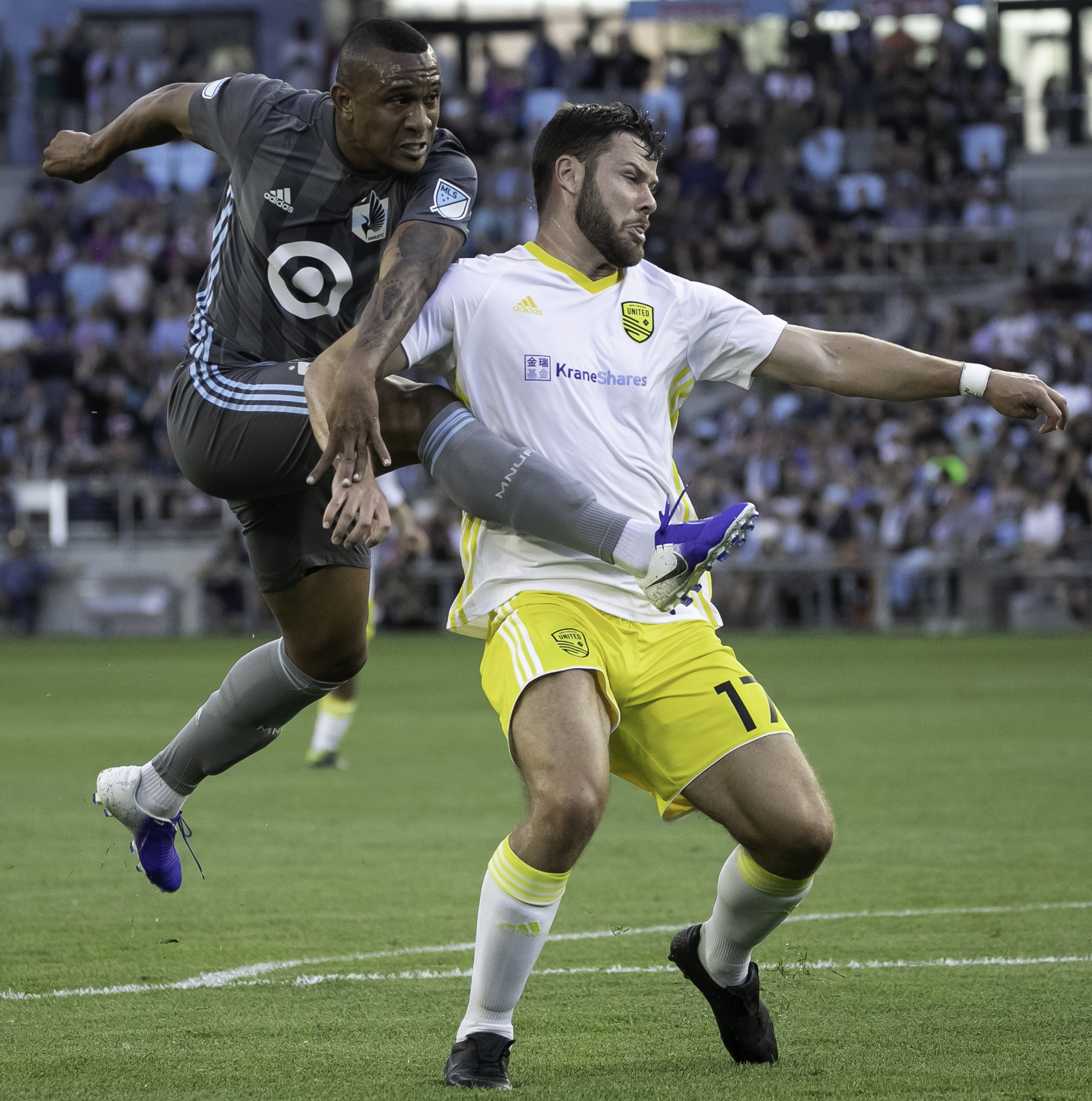

Personal information
- Date of birth: November 3, 1993 (age 32)
- Place of birth: Everett, Washington, U.S.
- Height: 6 ft 2 in (1.88 m)
- Position: Central defender

College career
Years	Team	Apps	(Gls)
2012–2016	Washington Huskies	69	(7)

Senior career*
Years	Team	Apps	(Gls)
2014–2015	Washington Crossfire	11	(0)
2017	Real Salt Lake	9	(0)
2017	→ Real Monarchs (loan)	5	(0)
2018	Sacramento Republic	21	(0)
2019–2021	New Mexico United	54	(2)
- * Club domestic league appearances and goals as of November 8, 2021

Justin Schmidt (born November 3, 1993) is an American former soccer player.

== Career ==
=== College and amateur ===
Schmidt played college soccer at the University of Washington between 2012 and 2016, and in the USL Premier Development League with Washington Crossfire.

=== Professional ===
Schmidt was drafted in the second round (35th overall) of the 2017 MLS SuperDraft by Real Salt Lake. Schmidt signed with the club on March 1, 2017. He made his full professional debut for Salt Lake on March 11, 2017, against Chicago Fire.

On February 4, 2018, Schmidt signed with USL side Sacramento Republic for the 2018 season.

Schmidt signed for New Mexico United ahead of their inaugural USL Championship season in 2019.

Following the 2021 season, Schmidt left New Mexico to join the United States Army.

== Career statistics ==
As of match played November 8, 2021

Appearances and goals by season, competition, and club
Club	Season	League			Domestic Cup		League Cup		Total	
Club	Season	Division	Apps	Goals	Apps	Goals	Apps	Goals	Apps	Goals
Washington Crossfire	2014	USL PDL	6	0	—		—		6	0
Washington Crossfire	2015	USL PDL	5	0	—		—		5	0
Washington Crossfire	Total		11	0	—		—		11	0
Real Salt Lake	2017	MLS	9	0	1 (Note: Appearance(s) in the US Open Cup)	0	—		10	0
Real Monarchs (loan)	2017	USL	5	0	—		0	0	5	0
Sacramento Republic	2018	USL	20	0	3	0	1 (Note: Appearance(s) in USL Cup playoffs)	0	24	0
New Mexico United	2019	USL Championship	30	2	5	0	1 (Note: Appearance(s) in USL Championship playoffs)	0	36	2
New Mexico United	2020	USL Championship	1	0	—		0	0	1	0
New Mexico United	2021	USL Championship	23	0	—		—		23	0
New Mexico United	Total		54	2	5	0	1	0	60	2
Career total			99	2	9	0	2	0	110	2
