= Austin Yearwood =

American soccer player (born 1994)

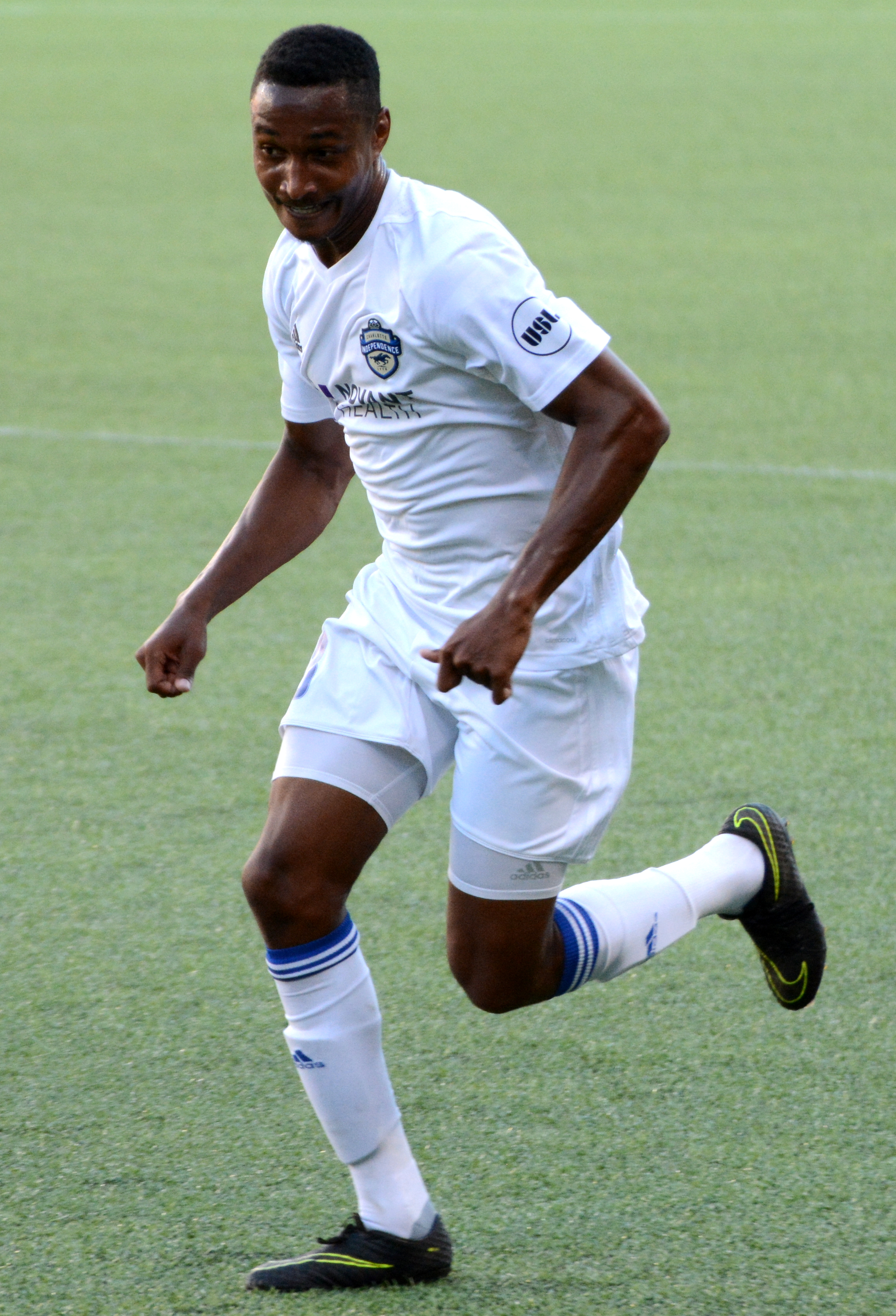
- Yearwood with Charlotte Independence in 2017

Personal information
- Date of birth: August 12, 1994 (age 32)
- Place of birth: Charlotte, North Carolina, United States
- Height: 6 ft 0 in (1.83 m)
- Position: Left back

College career
Years	Team	Apps	(Gls)
2012–2015	High Point Panthers	77	(1)

Senior career*
Years	Team	Apps	(Gls)
2013–2014	Carolina Dynamo	19	(1)
2015	Charlotte Eagles	14	(0)
2016–2017	Charlotte Independence	24	(0)
2018	Richmond Kickers	21	(0)
2019–2023	New Mexico United	99	(1)
- * Club domestic league appearances and goals as of October 21, 2023

Austin Yearwood (born August 12, 1994) is an American former professional soccer player. He operates as a left back or left wing-back.

== Career ==
=== College and amateur ===
Yearwood graduated from South Mecklenburg High School in Charlotte, North Carolina. While in high school he was a 2011 NCSCA All-State selection, three-time All-Region, and three-time All-Conference. Yearwood also played in the 2011 ESPNHS All-American game.

He played college soccer at High Point University from 2012 to 2015. While at college, Yearwood also appeared for USL PDL clubs Carolina Dynamo in 2013 and 2014, and Charlotte Eagles in 2015.

=== Professional ===
Yearwood signed with United Soccer League side Charlotte Independence on March 31, 2016.

Yearwood signed with Richmond Kickers on December 15, 2017.

On November 6, 2018, he signed for USL Championship expansion club New Mexico United. He scored his first professional goal on June 16, 2021, the team's second in a 2–0 win over San Antonio FC. Following the 2021 season, Yearwood was named New Mexico United's Defensive Player of the Year.

== Career statistics ==
As of match played July 30, 2024.

Club	Season	League			Domestic Cup		League Cup		Total	
Club	Season	Division	Apps	Goals	Apps	Goals	Apps	Goals	Apps	Goals
Charlotte Independence	2016	USL	3	0	0	0	0	0	3	0
Charlotte Independence	2017	USL	21	0	2 (Note: Appearance(s) in the US Open Cup)	0	1 (Note: Appearance(s) in USL Cup playoffs)	0	24	0
Charlotte Independence	Total		24	0	2	0	1	0	27	0
Richmond Kickers	2018	USL	21	0	3	0	—		24	0
New Mexico United	2019	USL Championship	16	0	5	0	1 (Note: Appearance(s) in USL Championship playoffs)	0	22	0
New Mexico United	2020	USL Championship	13	0	—		2	0	15	0
New Mexico United	2021	USL Championship	31	1	—		—		31	1
New Mexico United	2022	USL Championship	16	0	2	0	1	0	19	0
New Mexico United	2023	USL Championship	23	0	2	0	0	0	25	
New Mexico United	Total		99	1	9	0	4	0	73	1
Career total			144	1	14	0	5	0	122	1
