= Ben Beaury =

American soccer player

Personal information
- Full name: Benjamin Beaury
- Date of birth: May 13, 1996 (age 30)
- Place of birth: Cohoes, New York, U.S.
- Height: 5 ft 10 in (1.78 m)
- Position: Goalkeeper

College career
Years	Team	Apps	(Gls)
2014–2017	Le Moyne Dolphins	76	(0)

Senior career*
Years	Team	Apps	(Gls)
2016–2017	Reading United	11	(0)
2018	Charlotte Independence	0	(0)
2019–2020	New Mexico United	1	(0)
2020	→ Reno 1868 (loan)	10	(0)
2021	Oakland Roots	0	(0)
2021	El Paso Locomotive	2	(0)
Total		24	(0)
- * Club domestic league appearances and goals as of November 10, 2022

Ben Beaury (born May 13, 1996) is an American former professional soccer player who played as a goalkeeper.

== Career ==
=== College and amateur ===
Beaury played college soccer at Le Moyne College from 2014 to 2017, where he made 76 appearances.

While at college, Beaury appeared for USL PDL side Reading United AC in 2016 and 2017.

=== Professional ===
On May 31, 2018, Beaury signed with USL Championship side Charlotte Independence.

On December 19, 2018, Beaury was confirmed as a new signing for USL Championship side New Mexico United ahead of their inaugural season. He made his professional debut on September 28, 2019, starting in a 2–2 draw with Phoenix Rising.

Beaury was loaned to Reno 1868 FC ahead of the restart of the coronavirus-delayed 2020 USL Championship season. He became the team's starting keeper, marking his first significant playing time since college.

On February 1, 2021, Beaury was signed by Oakland Roots SC ahead of its first season in the USL Championship.

Beaury joined El Paso Locomotive FC on May 20, 2021, without having made an appearance for Oakland Roots. He then left at the end of the season, making 2 appearances for the club.

== Career statistics ==
As of match played October 17, 2020

=== Club ===
Appearances by club, season, and competition
Club	Season	League			Domestic Cup		League Cup		Total	
Club	Season	Division	Apps	Goals	Apps	Goals	Apps	Goals	Apps	Goals
Reading United	2016	USL PDL	1	0	0	0	0	0	1	0
Reading United	2017	USL PDL	2	0	2 (Note: Appearance(s) in US Open Cup)	0	0	0	4	0
Reading United	Total		3	0	2	0	0	0	5	0
Charlotte Independence	2018	USL	0	0	0	0	—		0	0
New Mexico United	2019	USL Championship	1	0	0	0	0	0	1	0
New Mexico United	2020	USL Championship	0	0	—		0	0	0	0
New Mexico United	Total		1	0	0	0	0	0	1	0
Reno 1868 (loan)	2020	USL Championship	10	0	—		2 (Note: Appearance(s) in USL Championship playoffs)	0	12	0
Career total			14	0	2	0	2	0	18	0
