= Manny Padilla =

American soccer player

Personal information
- Full name: Manuel Padilla
- Date of birth: February 5, 1996 (age 30)
- Place of birth: Palestine, Texas, United States
- Height: 1.78 m (5 ft 10 in)
- Position: Right back

Youth career
- –2014: LA Galaxy

College career
Years	Team	Apps	(Gls)
2014–2017	San Francisco Dons	69	(0)

Senior career*
Years	Team	Apps	(Gls)
2016	FC Golden State Force	10	(0)
2017	San Francisco City FC	11	(2)
2018	Rio Grande Valley FC	19	(0)
2019–2020	New Mexico United	27	(0)
- * Club domestic league appearances and goals as of October 25, 2019

Manuel Padilla (born February 5, 1996) is an American soccer player who most recently played for New Mexico United in the USL Championship.

== Career ==
=== Youth and college ===
Padilla played four years of college soccer at the University of San Francisco between 2014 and 2017. While attending USF, Padilla was involved in a sexual misconduct case involving a fellow student.

Padilla also played for Premier Development League side FC Golden State Force in 2016, and San Francisco City FC in 2017.

=== Professional ===
On January 21, 2018, Padilla was selected 89th overall in the 2018 MLS SuperDraft by Houston Dynamo. On March 16, 2018, Padilla signed with Houston's United Soccer League affiliate side Rio Grande Valley FC. He has also made his 1st team debut with Houston Dynamo in the US Open Cup.

Padilla joined USL Championship side New Mexico United on March 7, 2019, ahead of their inaugural season.

On July 14, 2020, New Mexico United suspended Padilla pending an internal investigation into his sexual misconduct case. Following this investigation, Padilla was released by the club on July 25, 2020.
