= Ethen Sampson =

South African soccer player

Personal information
- Date of birth: 28 December 1993 (age 32)
- Place of birth: Mitchell's Plain, South Africa
- Height: 5 ft 10 in (1.78 m)
- Position: Right back

Youth career
- 2009–2012: ASD Cape Town
- 2012–2013: Whitecaps FC Residency

Senior career*
Years	Team	Apps	(Gls)
2013–2014	Vancouver Whitecaps U23	7	(0)
2014–2015	Vancouver Whitecaps	3	(0)
2015	→ Whitecaps FC 2 (loan)	12	(1)
2017	Ubuntu Cape Town	12	(0)
2019	New Mexico United	12	(0)
2020–2022	Baroka	10	(1)
2022	Black Leopards	13	(0)

International career
2009–2010	South Africa U17		
2011–2013	South Africa U20		
- * Club domestic league appearances and goals as of 25 October 2019

Ethen Sampson (born 28 December 1993) is a South African soccer player. He is mainly deployed as a right back.

== Club career ==
Sampson signed with Major League Soccer club Vancouver Whitecaps FC on 6 March 2014 after spending the 2013 season with their USL PDL feeder team.

Sampson made his professional debut in a 0–0 draw against D.C. United on 6 September 2014.

Vancouver declined its contract option on Sampson following the 2015 MLS season.

== Career statistics ==
As of match played 9 December 2020

Club	Season	League			Domestic Cup		League Cup		Continental		Total	
Club	Season	Division	Apps	Goals	Apps	Goals	Apps	Goals	Apps	Goals	Apps	Goals
Vancouver Whitecaps U-23	2013	USL PDL	8	0	—		—		—		8	0
Vancouver Whitecaps	2014	MLS	2	0	0	0	1 (Note: Appearance(s) in MLS Cup playoffs)	0	—		3	0
Vancouver Whitecaps	2015	MLS	1	0	2 (Note: Appearance(s) in Canadian Championship)	0	0	0	1 (Note: Appearance(s) in CONCACAF Champions League)	0	4	0
Vancouver Whitecaps	Total		3	0	2	0	1	0	1	0	7	0
Whitecaps FC 2 (loan)	2015	USL	12	1	—		—		—		12	1
Ubuntu Cape Town	2017/18	National First Division	12	0	0	0	—		—		12	0
New Mexico United	2019	USL Championship	12	0	5 (Note: Appearance(s) in US Open Cup)	0	0	0	—		17	0
Baroka	2019/20	Premier Division	10	1	3 (Note: Appearance(s) in Nedbank Cup)	0	0	0	—		13	1
Black Leopards	2020/21	Premier Division	4	0	0	0	0	0	—		4	0
Career total			61	2	10	0	1	0	1	0	73	2
