= Daniel Bruce (footballer, born 1996) =

English footballer

Personal information
- Date of birth: 13 May 1996 (age 30)
- Place of birth: Warrington, England
- Height: 1.68 m (5 ft 6 in)
- Position: Midfielder

Youth career
- England School Boys

College career
Years	Team	Apps	(Gls)
2014–2018	Charlotte 49ers	63	(18)

Senior career*
Years	Team	Apps	(Gls)
2019–2025	New Mexico United	150	(15)

Managerial career
- 2026–: New Mexico United (assistant)
- * Club domestic league appearances and goals

Daniel Bruce (born 13 May 1996) is an English football coach and former professional footballer who played his entire career as a midfielder for New Mexico United in the USL Championship. He currently serves as an Assistant Coach for New Mexico United.

== College ==
Bruce played four years of college soccer at the University of North Carolina at Charlotte between 2015 and 2018, as well as spending 2014 as a redshirt.

== Professional ==
On 27 February 2019, Bruce signed for USL Championship side New Mexico United ahead of their inaugural season.

In July 2025, during his seventh season with the club, Bruce suffered a season-ending knee injury. On 22 October 2025, Bruce announced that he would be retiring from professional football at the end of the 2025 season.

At the time of his retirement Bruce was the all-time appearances leader for New Mexico United seeing action in 170 matches across all competitions.

== Coaching ==
In January 2026, New Mexico United named Bruce an Assistant Coach for the 2026 USL Championship season.

== Career statistics ==
=== Club ===
As of matches played 24 October 2025

Club	Season	League			Domestic Cup		Other		Total	
Club	Season	Division	Apps	Goals	Apps	Goals	Apps	Goals	Apps	Goals
New Mexico United	2019	USL Championship	16	2	4 (Note: Appearance(s) in US Open Cup)	0	1 (Note: Appearance(s) in USL Championship playoffs)	0	21	2
New Mexico United	2020	USL Championship	13	0	—		2	0	17	0
New Mexico United	2021	USL Championship	30	3	—		—		30	3
New Mexico United	2022	USL Championship	30	2	2	0	—		32	2
New Mexico United	2023	USL Championship	22	3	2	1	—		26	4
New Mexico United	2024	USL Championship	29	5	4	1	1	0	34	6
New Mexico United	2025	USL Championship	10	0	4 (Note: Appearance(s) in US Open Cup & USL Cup)	0	—		14	0
New Mexico United	Total		143	15	12	2	3	0	155	17
Career total			150	15	16	2	4	0	170	17
