= Kenny Akamatsu =

Japanese footballer

Ken Akamatsu
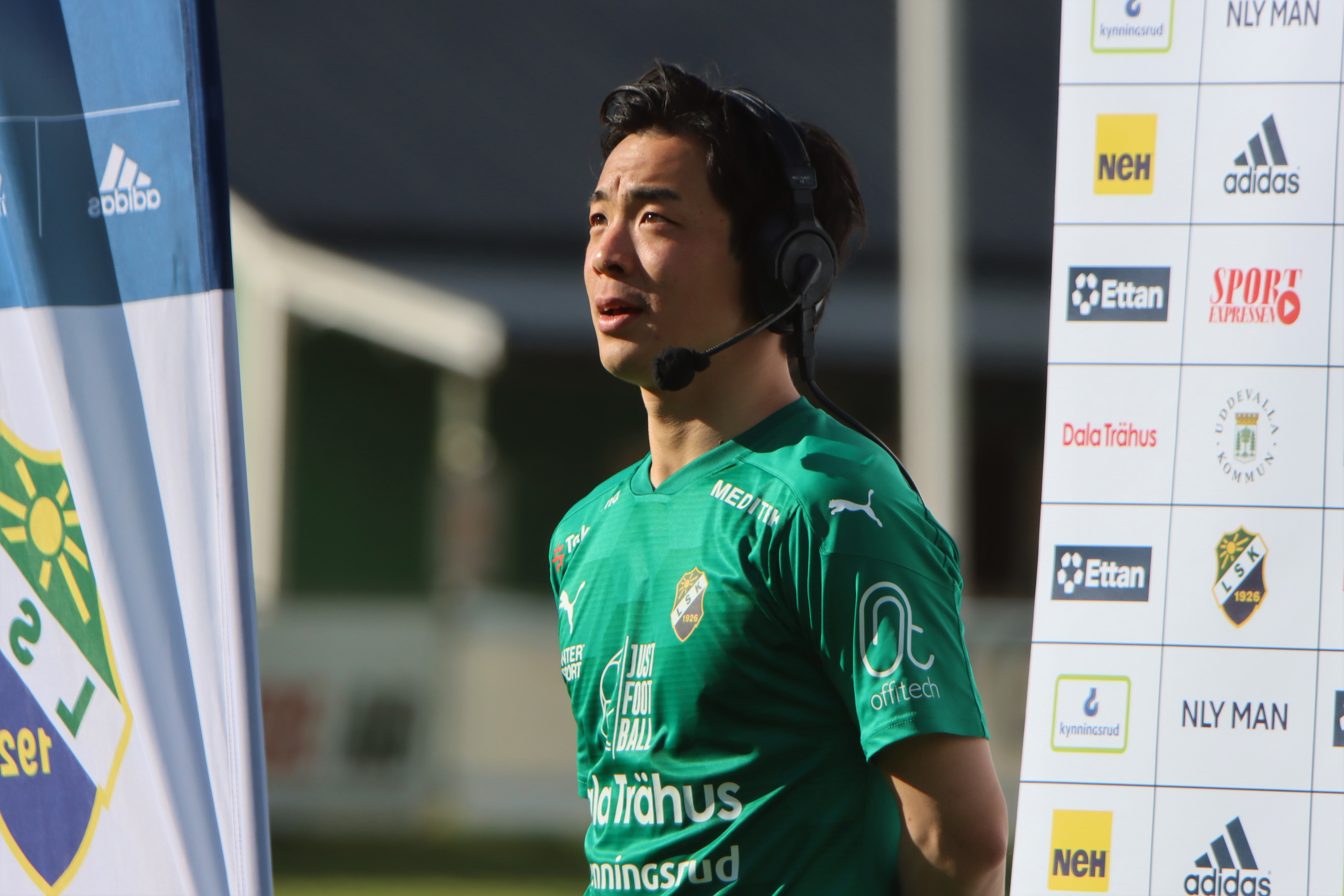

Personal information
- Date of birth: 27 April 1995 (age 31)
- Place of birth: Niigata, Japan
- Height: 1.73 m (5 ft 8 in)
- Position: Left winger

Team information
- Current team: Ljungskile SK

Youth career
- Mitsubishi Yowa

College career
Years	Team	Apps	(Gls)
2015–2018	Denver Pioneers	77	(7)

Senior career*
Years	Team	Apps	(Gls)
2018	Colorado Rapids U23	8	(1)
2019	New Mexico United	15	(0)
2021–	Ljungskile SK	30	(7)
- * Club domestic league appearances and goals as of 12 March 2021

Ken Akamatsu (born 27 April 1995) is a Japanese footballer who plays as a left sided winger.

On 2024, He has joined Peninsula Power FC in Australia.

== Career statistics ==
As of match played October 19, 2019

Appearances by club, season, and competition
Club	Season	League			Domestic Cup		League Cup		Total	
Club	Season	Division	Apps	Goals	Apps	Goals	Apps	Goals	Apps	Goals
Colorado Rapids U-23	2018	USL PDL	8	1	—		0	0	8	1
New Mexico United	2019	USL Championship	15	0	1 (Note: Appearance(s) in US Open Cup)	0	0	0	16	0
Ljungskile SK	2021	Ettan Fotboll	30	7					30	
Career total			23	8	1	0	0	0	54	8
