= Ryan Williams (men's soccer, born 1996) =

American association football player

Personal information
- Date of birth: October 11, 1996 (age 30)
- Place of birth: Mililani, Hawaii, United States
- Height: 1.75 m (5 ft 9 in)
- Position: Attacking midfielder

Youth career
- 2012–2015: Colorado Rush

College career
Years	Team	Apps	(Gls)
2015–2018	John Brown Golden Eagles	73	(27)

Senior career*
Years	Team	Apps	(Gls)
2014–2018	Charlotte Eagles	38	(6)
2019–2020	New Mexico United	27	(2)
- * Club domestic league appearances and goals as of October 5, 2020

Ryan Williams (born October 11, 1996) is a former American soccer player who plays as an attacking midfielder.

== Career ==
On January 9, 2019, USL Championship side New Mexico United announced they had signed Ryan Williams ahead of their inaugural 2019 season. Williams announced his retirement from playing professional soccer following New Mexico's 2020 season.

== Career statistics ==
As of match played October 17, 2020

Appearances by club, season, and competition
Club	Season	League			Domestic Cup		League Cup		Total	
Club	Season	Division	Apps	Goals	Apps	Goals	Apps	Goals	Apps	Goals
Charlotte Eagles	2014	USL PDL	8	1	0	0	—		8	1
Charlotte Eagles	2015	USL PDL	6	0	—		0	0	6	0
Charlotte Eagles	2016	USL PDL	10	0	0	0	1 (Note: Appearance in PDL Eastern Conference playoffs)	0	11	0
Charlotte Eagles	2017	USL PDL	13	4	1 (Note: Appearance(s) in the US Open Cup)	1	4 (Note: Includes 2 appearances in PDL Eastern Conference playoffs and 2 in PDL National Championship)	3	18	8
Charlotte Eagles	2018	USL PDL	1	1	—		—		1	1
Charlotte Eagles	Total		38	6	1	1	5	3	44	10
New Mexico United	2019	USL Championship	15	2	2	0	0	0	17	2
New Mexico United	2020	USL Championship	12	0	—		2 (Note: Appearance(s) in USL Championship playoffs)	0	14	0
New Mexico United	Total		27	2	2	0	2	0	31	2
Career total			65	8	3	1	7	3	75	12
