= Toni Soler =

Spanish footballer

Personal information
- Full name: Antonio Soler Mulet
- Date of birth: 23 March 1992 (age 34)
- Place of birth: L'Eliana, Valencia, Spain
- Height: 1.77 m (5 ft 10 in)
- Position: Defensive midfielder

Team information
- Current team: Deren F.C.
- Number: 77

Youth career
- Villarreal C.F.

College career
Years	Team	Apps	(Gls)
2015–2017	Adelphi Panthers	60	(10)
2018	Tampa Spartans	14	(0)

Senior career*
Years	Team	Apps	(Gls)
2011–2013	Villarreal	0	(0)
2011–2012	→ La Roda (loan)	12	(0)
2012	→ Alzira (loan)	4	(0)
2012–2013	→ Atlético Saguntino (loan)		
2013–2014	Jove Español	20	(0)
2014–2015	Atlético Saguntino	26	(0)
2017–2018	Tormenta 2	25	(2)
2019	New Mexico United	8	(0)
2020–2021	Club Valencia	6	(0)
2022	Pascoe Vale	11	(1)
2023	Western Pride	14	(3)
2023–	Deren		
- * Club domestic league appearances and goals

Antonio Soler Mulet (born 23 March 1992), commonly known as Toni Soler, is a Spanish professional footballer who plays as a defensive midfielder.

== Playing career ==
=== Youth and college ===
After playing with the Villarreal academy and the Spanish u16 and u17 National Team, and having various spells in the Second B and Third Division leagues in Spain, Soler moved to the United States in 2015 to play college soccer at Adelphi University where he would graduate three years later with a bachelor's degree in psychology. He then transferred to the University of Tampa in 2018 for one semester as a graduate student.

While at college, Soler also appeared for Premier Development League side South Georgia Tormenta.

== Club ==
=== New Mexico United ===
On 11 November 2018, Soler was signed by USL Championship expansion club New Mexico United ahead of its inaugural season. The club was able to qualify for the playoffs where they would end up losing to Sacramento Republic with a 1–0 defeat in the playoff quarter finals.

=== Club Valencia ===
After spending almost 5 years in the United States, Toni moved to the Maldives to play for Club Valencia for the 20/21 season, where he had an important role allowing the team to qualify for the AFC Cup. The team ended the season in second place and he was considered one of the best midfielders in the Dhivehi Premier League.

=== Pascoe Vale ===
In 2022, after finishing in the Maldives, he moved to Australia where he was playing in the NPL for Pascoe Vale FC. Due to some injuries he was only able to play for half of the season. His team was one game away from earning promotion.

=== Western Pride ===
In 2023, he moved to Western Pride in Queensland. He scored 3 goals in 14 games, with the club missing out on finals football on the final day of the regular season.

=== Deren FC ===
The year after, in 2023, Toni signed for Mongolian professional team Deren FC, which was the runner-up in the Mongolian Premier League the previous two seasons, in an attempt from the team to capture the league title. In his first 2 games, Toni would score 1 goal and would give 2 assists, having an immediate impact on the team.
