= Joris Ahlinvi =

French footballer (born 1995)

Personal information
- Full name: Joris Rudolph Elavagnon Ahlinvi
- Date of birth: 13 July 1995 (age 31)
- Place of birth: Bordeaux, France
- Height: 1.79 m (5 ft 10 in)
- Position: Winger

Youth career
- 2011–2014: Valenciennes

College career
Years	Team	Apps	(Gls)
2016–2018	FIU Panthers	47	(16)
2019	Indiana Hoosiers	10	(2)

Senior career*
Years	Team	Apps	(Gls)
2012–2014	Valenciennes II	7	(2)
2014–2015	Montpellier II	20	(3)
2015–2016	US Lège-Cap-Ferret	16	(6)
2017	Reading United	1	(0)
2020	New Mexico United	6	(2)
2021–2022	Virton	4	(0)
2022–2023	Bassin d'Arcachon		
2023–2024	US Lège-Cap-Ferret	12	(0)
- * Club domestic league appearances and goals as of 1 July 2024

Joris Ahlinvi (born 13 July 1995) is a French professional footballer who most recently played as a winger for Championnat National 3 club Lège-Cap-Ferret.

== Club career ==
=== Valenciennes, Montpellier & Lége-Cap-Ferret ===
Ahlinvi played with the Valenciennes academy and their second team in the CFA. Following Valenciennes relegation in Ligue 2, he chose to joined Montpellier in June 2014. He later joined CFA 2 side US Lège-Cap-Ferret, where he scored 6 goals in 16 appearances.

=== College in the United States ===
In 2016, Ahlinvi made the move to the United States to play college soccer at Florida International University, where he played for 3 seasons, scoring 16 goals and tallying 9 assists in 47 appearances. During his time at FIU, Ahlinvi was named C-USA All-Tournament Team, C-USA All-Freshman Team, All-AAC Second Team, All C-USA First Team and USC All-Southeast Region First Team.

Ahlinvi transferred to Indiana University for his senior year in 2019. He scored 2 goals in 10 appearances for the Hoosiers and was named USC East Region First Team and All-AAC First Team.

=== Reading United ===
While at college, Ahlinvi made a single appearances for USL PDL side Reading United during their 2017 season.

=== 2020 MLS SuperDraft ===
On 13 January 2020, Ahlinvi was selected 53rd overall in the 2020 MLS SuperDraft by FC Cincinnati.

=== New Mexico United ===
On 13 February 2020, Ahlinvi signed for USL Championship side New Mexico United.

=== Virton ===
On 6 August 2021, Ahlinvi signed with Belgian Division 2 side Virton.

== International career ==
Born in France, Ahlinvi is Beninese by descent. He was named on the bench for the Benin national team during an international fixture against Equatorial Guinea on 14 June 2015.

== Personal life ==
Joris is the brother of professional footballer Mattéo Ahlinvi who plays for Farul Constanța in Romania.

== Career statistics ==
As of match played 17 October 2020

Appearances and goals by club, season and competition
Club	Season	League			National cup		League cup		Total	
Club	Season	Division	Apps	Goals	Apps	Goals	Apps	Goals	Apps	Goals
Valenciennes II	2012–13	Championnat de France Amateur	6	2	—		—		6	2
Valenciennes II	2013–14	Championnat de France Amateur 2	1	0	—		—		1	0
Valenciennes II	Total		7	2	—		—		7	2
Montpelier II	2014–15	Championnat de France Amateur	20	3	—		—		20	3
US Lège-Cap-Ferret	2015–16	Championnat de France Amateur 2	16	6	0	0	—		16	6
Reading United	2017	USL PDL	1	0	1 (Note: Appearance(s) in the US Open Cup)	0	0	0	2	0
New Mexico United	2020	USL Championship	4	2	—		2 (Note: Appearance(s) in USL Championship playoffs)	0	6	2
Career total			48	13	1	0	2	0	51	13
