= Troy Lesesne =

American soccer coach (born 1983)

Personal information
- Full name: Troy Lesesne
- Date of birth: October 27, 1983 (age 43)
- Place of birth: West Columbia, South Carolina, U.S.

College career
| Years | Team | Apps | (Gls) |
| 2001–2004 | College of Charleston Cougars | | |

Senior career*
| Years | Team | Apps | (Gls) |
| 2005 | Charleston Battery | 7 | (0) |
| 2005 | Wilmington Hammerheads | 4 | (0) |
| 2006 | Charleston Battery | 23 | (0) |

Managerial career
- 2005–2013: College of Charleston (assistant)
- 2014: Charleston Battery (assistant)
- 2015–2018: Charlotte Independence (assistant)
- 2018–2021: New Mexico United
- 2022–2023: New York Red Bulls (assistant)
- 2023: New York Red Bulls
- 2024–2025: D.C. United
- * Club domestic league appearances and goals

Troy Lesesne (/ləˈseɪn/ lə-SAYN; born October 27, 1983) is an American soccer coach.

== Career ==
Born in West Columbia, South Carolina, Lesesne played four years of college soccer at the College of Charleston, helping them to 47 wins and a 2004 National Collegiate Athletic Association 2nd Round Tournament appearance after winning the Southern Conference Championship. He graduated from the Department of Communication with a Bachelor of Arts in 2004 and a Masters of Arts in communication in 2010. He was named a United Soccer Coaches NSCAA Division I All American following his senior season.

=== Professional ===
In August 2005, Lesesne signed with the Charleston Battery where he made 38 appearances in two seasons and helped the team progress to the United Soccer League Championship semifinals in 2006.

== Coaching career ==
From 2005 to 2014 Lesesne spent ten years as an Assistant Coach for the College of Charleston where he helped the program compile an 82–76–14 record, along with a Southern Conference regular-season championship and a second-round National Collegiate Athletic Association Tournament appearance in 2010. During his tenure, he was named one of the top-20 assistant coaches in the nation by CollegeSoccerNews.com in 2011 and 2013 and was also selected to the inaugural United Soccer Coaches NCAA “Top 30 Under 30” coaches program in 2013.

In 2014, Lesesne ascended from the college game to the professional coaching ranks spending the season as assistant coach and liaison with the Charleston Battery as part of their Major League Soccer and United Soccer League affiliation, serving as technical staff working with players on loan from the Vancouver Whitecaps. The Battery finished the 2014 campaign fifth in the regular-season standings, earning the club a spot in the playoffs.

In 2015, Lesesne was named the first assistant for the new expansion United Soccer League Championship team, Charlotte Independence, where he spent four years coaching under Mike Jeffries. He assisted in the team qualifying for back-to-back playoffs in 2016 and 2017, along with advancing to round 16 in the Lamar Hunt U.S. Open Cup in the club's inaugural season, which was the furthest for any lower league team.

On August 13, 2018, Lesesne was announced as the first Head Coach and Technical Director of the new United Soccer League Championship expansion club, New Mexico United. During his tenure with New Mexico United, the club posted a 34W-29D-25L record with two playoff appearances in 2019 and 2020. In 2019, New Mexico United advanced to the Quarterfinals of the Lamar Hunt US Open Cup. In 2020 the club secured its first playoff win and Lesesne was named USL Co-Coach of the Year. Lesesne also played an integral role in helping New Mexico United establish the Diversity Fellowship Program and a fully-funded youth academy, which produced its first-ever homegrown signing in Cristian Nava in 2021. He declined the club's contract extension offer and announced his resignation on November 5, 2021.

On January 25, 2022, Lesesne joined New York Red Bulls as an assistant coach.

On May 8, 2023, he was named head coach for the remainder of the 2023 season after the Red Bulls and Gerhard Struber mutually parted ways. Lesesne took over with the Red Bulls in last place in the Eastern Conference (1W-6D-4L) and helped lead them to the MLS Playoffs and their first postseason win since 2018 with a 5–2 result vs. Charlotte FC. He also guided the club to the Round of 16 in Leagues Cup, winning their group, along with progressing to the Round of 16 in the U.S. Open Cup. On November 14, 2023, it was announced that the Red Bulls would not be renewing Lesesne's contract

On January 10, 2024, it was announced that Lesesne had signed a three-year contract with D.C. United to serve as the club's head coach. On Decision Day in 2024, D.C. United narrowly missed the MLS Playoffs on goal differential which would have been their first postseason appearance since 2019. In Leagues Cup, D.C. United won the group stage over Atlanta United and Santos Laguna and progressed to the Round of 32. Lesesne helped Christian Benteke to the 2024 MLS Golden Boot, which was the first time since 2011 that the club had a player win this award.

In 2025, Lesesne lead D.C. United to the Quarterfinal round of the U.S. Open Cup, the furthest the club had progressed in the competition since winning it in 2013. On July 9, 2025, D.C. United fired Lesesne with the club in 12th place in the Eastern Conference. After Lesesne's dismissal D.C. United finished the 2025 season in last place, winning only one of its final 13 matches with a 1W-4D-8L record.

Lesesne holds a USSF Pro License.

In the modern era, Lesesne joins James O'Connor, Marc Dos Santos, Gio Savarese, Paulo Nagamura, and Eric Quill as the only coaches not associated with a second team/affiliate to ascend from the United Soccer League Championship or NASL to become an MLS Head Coach.

== Managerial statistics ==
As of match played 9 July 2025

Managerial record by team and tenure
| Team | Nat | From | To | Record | | | | | | | | Ref |
| Team | Nat | From | To | G | W | D | L | GF | GA | GD | Win % | Ref |
|---|---|---|---|---|---|---|---|---|---|---|---|---|
| New Mexico United | (United States) | August 13, 2018 | November 15, 2021 | 89 | 34 | 29 | 26 | 138 | 129 | +9 | 38.20 | |
| New York Red Bulls | (United States) | May 8, 2023 | November 14, 2023 | 32 | 14 | 8 | 10 | 41 | 37 | +4 | 43.75 | |
| D.C. United | (United States) | January 10, 2024 | July 9, 2025 | 61 | 16 | 19 | 26 | 83 | 122 | −39 | 26.23 | |
| Total | | | | 182 | 64 | 56 | 62 | 262 | 288 | −26 | 35.16 | |
