= 2020 El Paso Locomotive FC season =

El Paso Locomotive FC
2020 season
- Head coach: Mark Lowry
- Stadium: Southwest University Park, El Paso
- USL: Conference: 4th Group C: 1st
- USL Cup Playoffs: Conf. Finals
- 2020 U.S. Open Cup: Cancelled
- Copa Tejas: Not held
- Average home league attendance: 1,458 (Overall); 3,188 (Pre-Covid); 1,423 (Post-Covid)
- Biggest win: SLC 0–4 ELP (Oct. 4)
- Biggest defeat: PHX 1–3 ELP (Aug. 1)

The 2020 El Paso Locomotive FC season was the second season for El Paso Locomotive FC in the USL Championship (USLC), the second-tier professional soccer league in the United States and Canada. This article covers the period from November 18, 2019, the day after the 2019 USLC Playoff Final, to the conclusion of the 2020 USLC Playoff Final, scheduled for November 12–16, 2020.

== Club ==
=== Roster ===
As of July 7, 2020

No.	Position	Player	Nation
1	GK	USA	Logan Ketterer
2	DF	CAN	Drew Beckie
3	DF	BEL	Chiró N'Toko
4	DF	HAI	Mechack Jérôme
5	DF	MEX	Éder Borelli
6	MF	IRL	Richie Ryan
7	MF	USA	Dylan Mares
8	MF	SCO	Nick Ross
9	FW	USA	Omar Salgado
10	FW	BRA	Leandro Carrijó
11	MF	JAM	Saeed Robinson
12	GK	ENG	Jermaine Fordah
14	FW	NED	Marios Lomis
19	DF	ENG	Andrew Fox
20	MF	USA	Chapa Herrera
21	MF	COD	Distel Zola
22	DF	ENG	Moses Makinde
23	MF	USA	Memo Diaz
24	MF	ESP	Yuma
25	DF	COL	Bryam Rebellón
26	FW	MEX	Aarón Gómez (on loan from Juárez)
71	MF	CMR	Fabrice Fokobo

== Competitions ==
=== Exhibitions ===
January 29 Preseason 1	El Paso Locomotive FC	7–0	Texas United	El Paso, TX
	Zola; Herrera, Unannounced Player; Rebellón; Trialist; Trialist	Report

February 5 Preseason 2	El Paso Locomotive FC	0–1	FC Cincinnati	Tucson, AZ
	Makinde (yellow card) 24'; Zola (yellow card) 71'	Report	Alashe 81'	Stadium: Kino Sports Complex

February 7 Preseason 3	El Paso Locomotive FC	6–2	San Antonio FC	El Paso, TX
	(1st half); Salgado (2nd half); Lomis (2nd half); Bosetti (2nd half); Beckie (2nd half) (2nd half)	Report	Di Renzo (1st half); Gallegos (1st half)

February 15 Preseason 4	El Paso Locomotive FC	1–4	New Mexico United	El Paso, TX
	Zola (2nd half)	Report	Parkes 5'; Makinde 35' (o.g.); Sergi (2nd half); Sergi 80'	Stadium: Westside Training Fields; Attendance: closed-door

February 19 Preseason 5	FC Juárez (Mexico)	0–2	(United States) El Paso Locomotive FC	Juarez, Mexico
		Report	Ross 10'; Robinson 32'

February 22 Preseason 6	El Paso Locomotive FC	0–1	North Texas SC	Texas
		Report	Fazio (2nd half)

February 26 Preseason 7	OKC Energy FC	0–3	El Paso Locomotive FC	Tucson, AZ
		Report	Lomis 20'; Bosetti (2nd half); Salgado (3rd period)
Note: 120-minute scrimmage.

=== USL Championship ===
==== Standings — Group C ====
Pos	Team	Pld	W	D	L	GF	GA	GD	Pts	PPG	Qualification
1	El Paso Locomotive FC	16	9	5	2	24	14	+10	32	2.00	Advance to USL Championship Playoffs
2	New Mexico United	15	8	3	4	23	17	+6	27	1.80	Advance to USL Championship Playoffs
3	Colorado Springs Switchbacks FC	16	2	7	7	19	28	−9	13	0.81	
4	Real Monarchs	16	3	2	11	14	25	−11	11	0.69	

Source: USL

==== Match results ====
On December 20, 2019, the USL announced the 2020 season schedule, creating the following fixture list for the early part of El Paso's season.

March 6 1	Orange County SC	0–0	El Paso Locomotive FC	Irvine, CA
8:00 PM (MST)		Report	Fox (yellow card) 53'; Rebellón (yellow card) 58'	Stadium: Championship Soccer Stadium; Attendance: 3,188; Referee: Michael Radchuk

In the preparations for the resumption of league play following the shutdown prompted by the COVID-19 pandemic, the remainder of El Paso's schedule was announced on July 2.

July 11 2	El Paso Locomotive FC	1–0	Rio Grande Valley FC Toros	El Paso, TX
7:30 PM	Beckie (yellow card) 30'; Monsalvez (yellow card) 38'; Mares (yellow card) 78', (goal) 83'	Report	Murphy (yellow card) 79'; Castellanos (yellow card) 85'; Legault (yellow card) 90+5'	Stadium: Southwest University Park; Referee: Ismir Pekmic

July 15 3	El Paso Locomotive FC	2–2	New Mexico United	El Paso, TX
8:00 PM MDT	Rebellón (yellow card) 37'; Salgado (yellow card) 40', (goal) 43'; Fox 45+5'; Jérôme (yellow card) 84'; Mares (yellow card) 90+6'	Report	Wehan 11'; Tinari (yellow card) 49'; Parkes (yellow card) 53'; Sandoval 76' (pen.)	Stadium: Southwest University Park; Referee: Chris Ruska

July 24 4	El Paso Locomotive FC	1–2	New Mexico United	El Paso, TX
7:30 PM MDT	Beckie (yellow card) 69'; Gómez 86' (pen.), (yellow card) 87'; N'Toko (yellow card) 90+6'	Report	Wehan 35'; Sandoval 45+4'; Guzmán (yellow card) 76'; Mizell (yellow card) 87'	Stadium: Southwest University Park; Referee: Matthew Thompson

August 1 5	Phoenix Rising FC	3–1	El Paso Locomotive FC	Scottsdale, AZ
7:30 PM MDT	Dadashov 19' (pen.); Asante 36'; Flemmings 45+6'; Lambert (yellow card) 67'; Dick (yellow card) 90+6'	Report	Gómez 15'; Yuma (yellow card) 21'; Beckie (yellow card) 40'	Stadium: Casino Arizona Field; Referee: Alan Martinez

August 8 6	El Paso Locomotive FC	4–2	Colorado Springs Switchbacks FC	El Paso, TX
7:30 PM MDT	Mares 15', (yellow card) 90+2'; Gómez 21'; Diaz (yellow card) 23'; Herrera 66', 68'	Report	Reaves (yellow card) 14'; Quintero (yellow card) 36'; Luna 82', 90+1'; Burt (yellow card) 87'	Stadium: Southwest University Park; Referee: Jonathan Bilinski

August 15 7	Real Monarchs	0–1	El Paso Locomotive FC	Herriman, UT
8:00 PM MDT	Brown (yellow card) 44'; Moberg (yellow card) 65'; Blake (yellow card) 76'; Powder (yellow card) 80'	Report	Herrera (yellow card) 34'; Ross 50'; Ketterer (yellow card) 89'	Stadium: Zions Bank Stadium; Referee: Brad Jensen

August 22 8	Colorado Springs Switchbacks FC	0–0	El Paso Locomotive FC	Colorado Springs, CO
6:00 PM MDT	Quintero (yellow card) 18'; Volesky (yellow card) 89'	Report	King (yellow card) 16'; Rebellón (yellow card) 51'; Ryan (yellow card) 82'	Stadium: Weidner Field; Attendance: 1,000; Referee: Laura Rodriguez

August 29 9	El Paso Locomotive FC	2–1	Real Monarchs	El Paso, TX
7:30 PM MDT	Rebellón (yellow card) 24', (goal) 86'; Zola (yellow card) 49'; Kallman 53'	Report	Blake (yellow card) 24'; Powder (yellow card) 34'; Coffee 81'	Stadium: Southwest University Park; Attendance: 801; Referee: Elton García

September 2 10	Colorado Springs Switchbacks FC	P–P	El Paso Locomotive FC	Colorado Springs, CO
5:00 PM MDT				Stadium: Weidner Field
Note: Match postponed due to the COVID exposure of a person in the Switchbacks' organization.

September 5 11	El Paso Locomotive FC	3–2	New Mexico United	El Paso, TX
7:30 PM (MDT)	King 25', (yellow card) 40'; Yearwood 60' (o.g.); Fox (yellow card) 82'; Mares 88'; Beckie (yellow card) 90'	Report	Estrada 13', (yellow card) 44'; Sandoval 41', (yellow card) 52'; Muhammad (yellow card) 70'; Wehan (yellow card) 89'	Stadium: Southwest University Park; Attendance: 1,519; Referee: Malik Badawi

September 12 12	El Paso Locomotive FC	2–1	San Antonio FC	El Paso, TX
7:30 PM MDT	Gómez 40' (pen.); Fox (yellow card) 43'; Salgado (yellow card) 84'; King (yellow card) 90+4'; Taintor 90+4' (o.g.)	Report	Montgomery (yellow card) 39'; Solignac 45' (pen.); Marcina (yellow card) 52'; PC (yellow card) 69'; Perruzza (yellow card) 83'; Taintor (yellow card) 90+3'	Stadium: Southwest University Park; Attendance: 1,519; Referee: Michael Radchuk

September 16 13	El Paso Locomotive FC	2–0	Colorado Springs Switchbacks FC	El Paso, TX
7:00 PM MDT	Robinson 53'; King (yellow card) 57'; Salgado 74'; Monsalvez (yellow card) 85'	Report	Daniels (yellow card) 26'	Stadium: Southwest University Park; Attendance: 1,519; Referee: Marco Vega

September 19 14	El Paso Locomotive FC	1–0	Real Monarchs	El Paso, TX
7:30 PM MDT	Borelli 45+3'; Ryan (yellow card) 79'	Report	Blake (yellow card) 47'; Moberg (yellow card) 78'; Ávila (yellow card) 87'; Brown (yellow card) 89'	Stadium: Southwest University Park; Attendance: 1,519; Referee: Ismir Pekmic

September 26 15	El Paso Locomotive FC	0–0	New Mexico United	El Paso, TX
7:30 PM (MDT)	Borelli (yellow card) 28'; Rebellón (yellow card) 41'; Ryan (yellow card) 52'; Carrijó (yellow card) 68'	Report	Moreno (yellow card) 36'; Tetteh (yellow card) 88'	Stadium: Southwest University Park; Attendance: 1,669; Referee: Ricardo Fierro

September 30 10	Colorado Springs Switchbacks FC	0–0	El Paso Locomotive FC	Colorado Springs, CO
7:00 PM MDT	Quintero (yellow card) 11'	Report	Robinson (yellow card) 57'	Stadium: Weidner Field; Referee: Elvis Osmanovic
Note: Reschedule of postponed match from September 2nd.

October 4 16	Real Monarchs	0–4	El Paso Locomotive FC	Herriman, UT
2:00 PM MDT	Davis (yellow card) 48'; Jasso (yellow card) 50'; Giménez (yellow card) 86'; Flores (yellow card) 90+3'	Report	Mares 8'; Gómez 68'; King (yellow card) 70'; Robinson 78', 87'; Diaz (yellow card) 83'	Stadium: Zions Bank Stadium; Attendance: 343; Referee: Brad Jensen

==== USL Championship Playoffs ====
October 10 Conf. Quarterfinals	El Paso Locomotive FC	2–2 (a.e.t.) (4–2 p)	FC Tulsa	El Paso, TX
7:30 p.m. MDT	Carrijó 19', 82'; Borelli (yellow card) 67'; Rebellón (yellow card) 96'	Report	Bird (yellow card) 24' da Costa 38'; Chapman-Page (yellow card) 61', (goal) 68', (red card) 101'	Stadium: Southwest University Park; Attendance: 1,659; Referee: Brandon Stevis
	Penalties
	Ross (penalty scored); Rebellón (penalty scored); Ryan (penalty scored); Robinson (penalty scored)		(penalty scored) Altamirano; (penalty missed) Moloto; (penalty missed) Martínez; (penalty scored) Bourgeois

October 17 Conf. Semifinals	El Paso Locomotive FC	1–1 (a.e.t.) (5–3 p)	New Mexico United	El Paso, TX
7:30 p.m. MDT	Mares 30'; Borelli (yellow card) 50'; Gómez (yellow card) 52'; Diaz (yellow card) 112'	Report	Hamilton (yellow card) 38'; Moreno (yellow card) 53'; Parkes 90+5'	Stadium: Southwest University Park; Attendance: 1,659; Referee: Jon Freemon
	Penalties
	Borelli (penalty scored); Ross (penalty scored); Ryan (penalty scored); Robinson (penalty scored); Zola (penalty scored)		(penalty scored) Sandoval; (penalty scored) Wehan; (penalty scored) Ryden; (penalty missed) Parkes

October 24 Conf. Final	Phoenix Rising FC	1–1 (a.e.t.) (4–2 p)	El Paso Locomotive FC	Scottsdale, AZ
7:30 PM MDT	Schweitzer 18'; Farrell (yellow card) 95'; Asante (yellow card) 109'; Lowe (yellow card) 113'	Report	Yuma (yellow card) 4'; King (yellow card) 54'; Rebellón 59', (yellow card) 94'; Herrera (yellow card) 105+2'; Diaz (yellow card) 106'; Ryan (yellow card) 108'; Carrijó (yellow card) 111'	Stadium: Casino Arizona Field; Referee: Elton García
	Penalties
	Bakero (penalty scored); Whelan (penalty scored); Farrell (penalty scored); Moar (penalty scored)		(penalty scored) Carrijó; (penalty missed) Ross; (penalty scored) Ryan; (penalty missed) Gómez

=== U.S. Open Cup ===
As a USL Championship club, El Paso will enter the competition in the Second Round, to be played April 7–9. It was announced on 29 January that their first opponent would be NISA side Detroit City FC.

8 April 2020 Round 2	Detroit City (Michigan)	P–P	(Texas) El Paso Locomotive FC	Hamtramck, Michigan
19:30 EST				Stadium: Keyworth Stadium
Note: Match postponed due to the COVID-19 pandemic
