= 2019 El Paso Locomotive FC season =

El Paso Locomotive FC
2019 season
- Head coach: Mark Lowry
- Stadium: Southwest University Park; El Paso
- USL: Conference: 6th
- USL Cup Playoffs: Conference Final
- 2019 U.S. Open Cup: 2nd Round
- Copa Tejas: 4th
- Highest home attendance: League/All: 8,324 (March 9 vs. OKC Energy)
- Lowest home attendance: League: 5,276 (May 12 vs. New Mexico United); All: 600 (May 15 vs. Forward Madison FC (USOC) )
- Average home league attendance: League: 6,585
- Biggest win: 3–0 (June 8 vs. LA Galaxy II) (September 7 at Las Vegas Lights FC); 4–1 (October 15 vs. Portland)
- Biggest defeat: 0–3 (thrice) (May 15 vs. Forward Madison FC (USOC) ) (June 29 at Fresno FC) (July 31 at New Mexico U.)

The 2019 El Paso Locomotive FC season was the inaugural season for El Paso Locomotive FC in the USL Championship, the second-tier professional soccer league in the United States and Canada.

== Club ==
=== Roster ===
As of August 15, 2019

No.	Position	Player	Nation
1	GK	USA	Logan Ketterer
2	DF	CAN	Drew Beckie
3	DF	BEL	Chiró N'Toko
4	DF	HAI	Mechack Jérôme
5	DF	USA	Daniel Navarro
6	MF	IRL	Richie Ryan
7	MF	COL	Sebastián Velásquez
8	MF	SCO	Nick Ross
9	FW	USA	Omar Salgado
10	MF	ARG	Sebastián Contreras
11	MF	MEX	Edson Partida (on loan from Toluca)
12	MF	USA	Joshua Castellanos
13	GK	ENG	Jermaine Fordah
15	DF	USA	James Kiffe
17	FW	USA	Jerome Kiesewetter
19	DF	ENG	Andrew Fox
20	MF	USA	Chapa Herrera
21	FW	FRA	Alexy Bosetti
22	DF	ENG	Moses Makinde
23	MF	USA	Memo Diaz
24	MF	ESP	Yuma
25	MF	COL	Bryam Rebellón
26	MF	MEX	Josué Gómez (on loan from Juárez)
30	GK	USA	Javier Beker

== Competitions ==
=== Preseason ===
January 26 Friendly	El Paso Locomotive FC	3–1	Texas United	El Paso, Texas
2:00 PM CST	N'Toko; Salgado,	Report	Goal	Stadium: Westside Soccer Complex

February 2 Friendly	El Paso Locomotive FC	2–0	Hooligans FC	El Paso, Texas
2:00 PM CST	Contreras (?)	USL Report		Stadium: Westside Soccer Complex

February 6 Friendly	El Paso Locomotive FC	2–0	Southwest FC Wolves	El Paso, Texas
7:00 PM CST				Stadium: Westside Soccer Complex

February 9 Friendly	El Paso Locomotive FC	0–1	New Mexico United	El Paso, Texas
2:00 PM CST			(?)	Stadium: Westside Soccer Complex

February 13 Friendly	(Mexico) FC Juárez	1–3	El Paso Locomotive FC	Juárez, Mexico
10:30 AM CST	Gomez 37'	Report	Kiffe 24'; Contreras 66'; Salgado 80'	Stadium: Estadio Olímpico Benito Juárez

February 16 Friendly	El Paso Locomotive FC	4–1	FC Grande	El Paso, Texas
	Salgado 1', Partida 5' (pen.); Herrera	Report	25' (pen.)	Stadium: Southwest University Park

February 23 Friendly	San Antonio FC	0–0	El Paso Locomotive FC	San Antonio, Texas
7:00 PM CST		Report		Stadium: Toyota Field
Note: Played in three periods of 45, 30, and 45 minutes.

March 2 Friendly	OKC Energy FC	2–1	El Paso Locomotive FC	Tucson, Arizona
10:00 AM CST	Brown; Cato	Report	Jérôme	Stadium: Kino North Stadium

=== USL Championship ===
==== Standings ====
Pos	Team	Pld	W	D	L	GF	GA	GD	Pts	Qualification
4	Real Monarchs (C)	34	16	8	10	71	53	+18	56	Conference Quarterfinals
5	Orange County SC	34	15	9	10	54	43	+11	54	Conference Quarterfinals
6	El Paso Locomotive FC	34	13	11	10	42	36	+6	50	Conference Quarterfinals
7	Sacramento Republic	34	14	6	14	50	43	+7	48	Play-In Round
8	Austin Bold FC	34	13	9	12	53	52	+1	48	Play-In Round

Source: USL Championship Standings
Rules for classification: 1) total wins; 2) total goal differential; 3) total goals scored; 4) points earned against top four Conference finishers; 5) disciplinary points; 6) coin toss or drawing of lots
(C) Champions

==== Match results ====
The 2019 USL Championship season schedule for the club was announced on December 19, 2018.

Win Draw Loss Upcoming fixture

Unless otherwise noted, all times in MST

March 9 1	El Paso Locomotive FC	1–3	OKC Energy	El Paso, TX
8:30 PM	Gebhard 16'; Kiffe (yellow card) 49'	Report	Brown 1', 54'; Harris (yellow card) 43'; Cato 81'	Stadium: Southwest University Park; Attendance: 8,324; Referee: Matthew Thompson

March 16 2	Real Monarchs	0–0	El Paso Locomotive FC	Herriman, UT
2:00 PM	Ryden (red card) 32'; Martínez (yellow card) 73'; Blake (yellow card) 90+2'	Report		Stadium: Zions Bank Stadium; Attendance: 1,320; Referee: Lukasz Szpala

March 23 3	El Paso Locomotive FC	2–2	Rio Grande Valley FC	El Paso, TX
8:30 PM	Ross 45+1'; Rebellón (yellow card) 59'; Contreras (yellow card) 72'; Gebhard 78'	Report	Dunwell (yellow card) 47'; Hernandez (yellow card) 66', (goal) 79'; Duvall (yellow card) 69'; Enríquez 90'	Stadium: Southwest University Park; Attendance: 7,458; Referee: Alejandro Aguilera

March 30 4	El Paso Locomotive FC	2–0	Orange County SC	El Paso, TX
9:30 PM	Kiffe (yellow card) 45+1'; Partida 64', 88'; Fox (yellow card) 90'	Report	Kontor (yellow card) 79'; Jones (yellow card) 89'; Leonardo (yellow card) 90+5'	Stadium: Southwest University Park; Attendance: 7,064; Referee: Elton Garcia

April 13 5	El Paso Locomotive FC	0–2	Phoenix Rising FC	El Paso, TX
7:30 PM		Report	Flemmings 7'; Lambert (yellow card) 69'; Spencer 77'; Fernandez (yellow card) 88'	Stadium: Southwest University Park; Attendance: 7,389; Referee: Mark Allatin

April 21 6	Austin Bold FC	0–0	El Paso Locomotive FC	Austin, TX
4:00 PM	Okugo (yellow card) 62'	Report	N'Toko (yellow card) 44'; Kiffe (yellow card) 79'	Stadium: Bold Stadium; Referee: Michael Radchuk

April 27 7	El Paso Locomotive FC	1–0	Reno 1868 FC	El Paso, TX
7:30 PM	Contreras 76' (pen.)	Report	Lacroix (yellow card) 52'; Seymore (yellow card) 69'	Stadium: Southwest University Park; Attendance: 7,389; Referee: Marco Vega

May 4 8	Colorado Springs Switchbacks FC	0–2	El Paso Locomotive FC	Colorado Springs, CO
6:00 PM	Schweitzer (yellow card) 65'	Report	Jérôme (yellow card) 24'; Ross (yellow card) 38'; Kiffe (yellow card) 45+3'; Kiesewetter 46', 56'; Ryan (yellow card) 59'; Rezende (yellow card) 64'	Stadium: Weidner Field; Attendance: 3,883; Referee: Lorant Varga

May 12 9	El Paso Locomotive FC	2–2	New Mexico United	El Paso, TX
6:00 PM	Rezende (yellow card) 28'; Kiesewetter 36', 65'; Contreras (yellow card) 45+1'; Monsalvez (red card) 72'	Report	Hamilton 45+2'; Williams (yellow card) 69', (goal) 79'; Moar (red card) 72'; Suggs (yellow card) 73'	Stadium: Southwest University Park; Attendance: 5,276; Referee: Gustavo Solorio

May 18 10	El Paso Locomotive FC	3–1	Sacramento Republic FC	El Paso, TX
7:30 PM	Rezende 10'; Kiesewetter 63', 73'; Herrera (yellow card) 88'; Salgado (yellow card) 90'	Report	Skundrich 35'	Stadium: Southwest University Park; Attendance: 5,667; Referee: Thomas Snyder

May 25 11	Portland Timbers 2	1–1	El Paso Locomotive FC	Portland, OR
8:00 PM	Asprilla 41', (yellow card) 65'; Hanson (yellow card) 45+2'	Report	N'Toko (yellow card) 31'; Salgado (yellow card) 40', (goal) 45+1'; Contreras (yellow card) 52'; Kiffe (yellow card) 75'; Jérôme (yellow card) 90+1'	Stadium: Providence Park; Attendance: 3,134; Referee: Elijio Arreguin

June 1 12	Tacoma Defiance	1–2	El Paso Locomotive FC	Tacoma, WA
9:00 pm (MDT)	Rogers (yellow card) 24'; Dhillon 42'; Daley (yellow card) 55'; Rydstrand (yellow card) 70'	Report	Kiesewetter 31'; Herrera (yellow card) 62'; Rezende 68'; Ross (yellow card) 75'	Stadium: Cheney Stadium; Attendance: 2,202; Referee: Joseph Salinas

June 8 13	El Paso Locomotive FC	3–0	LA Galaxy II	El Paso, TX
7:30 PM	Kiesewetter 43', 87'; Salgado 88'; Rezende (yellow card) 90+2'	Report	Zubak (yellow card) 40'; Iloski (red card) 55'	Stadium: Southwest University Park; Attendance: 7,611; Referee: Luis Guardia

June 15 14	Tulsa Roughnecks	0–2	El Paso Locomotive FC	Tulsa, OK
6:30 P.M.	Rogers (yellow card) 26'; Mompremier (yellow card) 87'	Report	Contreras 37'; Kiffe (yellow card) 43'; Kiesewetter 75' (pen.); Salgado (yellow card) 88'	Stadium: ONEOK Field; Attendance: 2,314; Referee: Jon Freemon

June 22 15	El Paso Locomotive FC	0–1	Las Vegas Lights FC	El Paso, TX
7:30 PM	Kiesewetter (yellow card) 66'; Beckie (yellow card) 90+3'	Report	Torres (yellow card) 27'; Tabortetaka 42'; Robinson (yellow card) 70'; Sandoval (yellow card) 71'; J. Gonzalez (yellow card) 81'; Olsen (yellow card) 86'; Fehr (yellow card) 90+5'	Stadium: Southwest University Park; Attendance: 8,117; Referee: Michael Radchuk

June 26 16	San Antonio FC	0–0	El Paso Locomotive FC	San Antonio, TX
6:30 PM	Ackon (yellow card) 45'; Barmby (yellow card) 58' (yellow-red card) 63'	Report	Beckie (yellow card) 16'; Ketterer (yellow card) 44'; Gebhard (yellow card) 87'; Gómez (yellow card) 90+3'	Stadium: Toyota Field; Attendance: 6,081; Referee: Rosendo Mendoza

June 29 17	Fresno FC	3–0	El Paso Locomotive FC	Fresno, CA
8:30 PM	Jackson 63'; Lawal 66', (yellow card) 68', (goal) 84'; Johnson (yellow card) 86'	Report	Navarro (yellow card) 28'; Fox (yellow card) 73'; Herrera (yellow card) 86'	Stadium: Chukchansi Park; Attendance: 3,452; Referee: Ismir Pekmic

July 6 18	OKC Energy	1–1	El Paso Locomotive FC	Oklahoma City, OK
7:00 PM	J. Brown (yellow card) 27'; R.García 29' (pen.), (yellow card) 53'; Harris (yellow card) 42'; Ibeagha (yellow card) 76'	Report	Beckie (yellow card) 28'; Williams 62' (o.g.)	Stadium: Taft Stadium; Attendance: 4,585; Referee: Thomas Snyder

July 17 19	El Paso Locomotive FC	1–3	San Antonio FC	El Paso, TX
7:00 PM	Fox (yellow card) 13', (goal) 28'; Salgado (yellow card) 90+2'	Report	López 8', 45+3'; Eboussi (yellow card) 34'; Jamieson 52'	Stadium: Southwest University Park; Attendance: 6,128; Referee: Mark Allatin

July 20 20	El Paso Locomotive FC	0–0	Real Monarchs	El Paso, TX
7:30 PM		Report	Okumu (yellow card) 21'; Palma (yellow card) 42'; Portillo (yellow card) 48'	Stadium: Southwest University Park; Attendance: 6,012; Referee: Calin Radosav

July 31 21	New Mexico United	3–0	El Paso Locomotive FC	Albuquerque, NM
7:00 PM	Frater 38' (pen.); Wehan 71', 75'; Madden (yellow card) 86'	Report	Herrera (yellow card) 41'; Ryan (yellow card) 49'; Beckie (yellow card) 56'	Stadium: Isotopes Park; Attendance: 13,521; Referee: Elton García

August 3 22	El Paso Locomotive FC	P–P	Portland Timbers 2	El Paso, TX
7:30 PM				Stadium: Southwest University Park; Referee: Dejan Susak
Note: Match postponed due to mass shooting event in El Paso.

August 10 23	Phoenix Rising FC	2–1	El Paso Locomotive FC	Scottsdale, AZ
8:30 PM	Aguinaga 21'; Jahn (yellow card) 40'; Asante 73' (pen.)	Report	Partida 26'; Kiffe (yellow card) 41' (red card) 45'; Contreras (yellow card) 42'; Velásquez (yellow card) 45'	Stadium: Phoenix Rising FC Soccer Complex; Attendance: 6,520; Referee: Guido Gonzales, Jr.

August 17 24	El Paso Locomotive FC	2–0	Tacoma Defiance	El Paso, TX
7:30 PM	Partida 32'; Makinde (yellow card) 48'; N'Toko (red card) 62'; Salgado 70'	Report	Berkolds (yellow card) 9'; Rubio (yellow card) 37'; Atencio (yellow card) 58'; Dhillon (yellow card) 61'	Stadium: Southwest University Park; Attendance: 6,222; Referee: Marco Vega

August 24 25	Rio Grande Valley FC Toros	1–0	El Paso Locomotive FC	Edinburg, TX
7:30 PM	Bird 46'	Report	Ryan (yellow card) 56' (yellow-red card) 90+1'	Stadium: H-E-B Park; Attendance: 4,275; Referee: Luis Guardia

September 4 26	El Paso Locomotive FC	2–2	Tulsa Roughnecks	El Paso, TX
7:00 PM	Herrera (yellow card) 24'; Rebellón (yellow card) 65'; Kiesewetter (yellow card) 73', (goal) 81'; Gómez 80'	Report	Marlon 41'; Altamirano 56'; Reyes (yellow card) 72'; Uzo (yellow card) 72'	Stadium: Southwest University Park; Attendance: 5,519; Referee: Matthew Thompson

September 7 27	Las Vegas Lights FC	0–3	El Paso Locomotive FC	Las Vegas, NV
8:30 PM	Torres (yellow card) 20'; Sandoval (yellow card) 29' (yellow-red card) 85'; Torre (yellow card) 39'	Report	Kiffe (yellow card) 46'; Velásquez 52' (pen.), (yellow card) 68'; Gómez 81', 90'	Stadium: Cashman Field; Referee: Farhad Dadkho

September 14 28	Orange County SC	2–0	El Paso Locomotive FC	Irvine, CA
8:00 PM	Seaton 36'; Jones 58'	Report	Ryan (yellow card) 45'; N'Toko (yellow card) 90'	Stadium: Championship Soccer Stadium; Attendance: 3,913; Referee: Greg Dopka

September 21 29	El Paso Locomotive FC	2–0	Colorado Springs Switchbacks FC	El Paso, TX
7:30 PM	Rebellón 22'; Bosetti 90'	Report	Burt (yellow card) 51'; Malcolm (yellow card) 76'	Stadium: Southwest University Park; Attendance: 6,401; Referee: Jonathan Bilinski

September 28 30	Sacramento Republic FC	1–2	El Paso Locomotive FC	Sacramento, CA
8:30 PM	Enevoldsen 14'; Skundrich (yellow card) 84'; Chantzopoulos (yellow card) 87'	Report	Fox (yellow card) 29'; Rebellón 48'; Monsalvez (yellow card) 57'; Gómez 90+1'	Stadium: Papa Murphy's Park; Attendance: 10,807; Referee: Rosendo Mendoza

October 2 31	El Paso Locomotive FC	2–1	Fresno FC	El Paso, TX
7:00 PM	N'Toko 53'; Salgado (yellow card) 88'; Kiesewetter 90+2'	Report	Kurimoto (yellow card) 42'; Ellis-Hayden (yellow card) 56'; Caffa 66'; Lawal (yellow card) 87'	Stadium: Southwest University Park; Attendance: 5,015; Referee: Elvis Osmanovic

October 5 32	Reno 1868 FC	0–0	El Paso Locomotive FC	Reno, NV
7:00 PM	Galindo (yellow card) 15'; Janjigian (yellow card) 89'	Report	Monsalvez (yellow card) 10'; Bosetti (yellow card) 54'; Diaz (yellow card) 84'	Stadium: Greater Nevada Field; Attendance: 5,402; Referee: Malik Badawi

October 10 33	El Paso Locomotive FC	1–1	Austin Bold FC	El Paso, TX
8:00 PM	Monsalvez (yellow card) 42'; Velásquez 76' (pen.)	Report	Mallace (yellow card) 35'; Okugo (yellow card) 45+3'; Kléber (yellow card) 53'; Lima (yellow card) 77', (goal) 81'; Taylor (yellow card) 82'; Soto (yellow card) 90+3'	Stadium: Southwest University Park; Attendance: 6,175; Referee: Pierre-Luc Lauziere

October 15 22	El Paso Locomotive FC	4–1	Portland Timbers 2	El Paso, TX
7:00 PM	Velásquez 4'; Monsalvez (yellow card) 12'; Ross 24'; Gómez 68', 79'	Report	Kobayashi 25'; Durán (yellow card) 78'; Diz (yellow card) 83'; Calixtro (yellow card) 88'	Stadium: Southwest University Park; Attendance: 6,175; Referee: Sergii Demianchuk
Note: Reschedule of postponed August 3 match.

October 19 34	LA Galaxy II	2–0	El Paso Locomotive FC	Carson, CA
8:00 PM	Zubak 15'; DePuy (yellow card) 34'; Iloski (yellow card) 36'; Kamara 52'; Harvey (yellow card) 64'	Report	Ryan (yellow card) 27'; Ketterer (yellow card) 53'; Salgado (yellow card) 54'; Bosetti (yellow card) 63'	Stadium: Dignity Health Sports Park; Attendance: 1,984; Referee: Greg Dopka

==== USL Cup Playoffs ====
October 26 Conference Quarterfinals	Fresno FC	2–3	El Paso Locomotive FC	Fresno, CA
8:30 PM	Chaney 49'; Strong (yellow card) 51' (red card) 86'; Cooper 55'	Report	Gómez 19'; Kiffe 77'; Velásquez 83' (pen.)	Stadium: Chukchansi Park; Attendance: 5,352; Referee: Lukasz Szpala

November 2 Conference Semifinals	El Paso Locomotive FC	3–0	Sacramento Republic FC	El Paso, TX
6:30 PM	Beckie (yellow card) 25'; Gómez 40'; Ryan (yellow card) 70'; Contreras 83' (pen.); Yuma (yellow card) 86'; Velásquez 88'	Report	Alemán (yellow card) 51'; Enevoldsen (yellow card) 70'; Barahona (yellow card) 87'	Stadium: Southwest University Park; Attendance: 7,460; Referee: Farhad Dadkho

November 9 Conference Finals	Real Monarchs	2–1 (a.e.t.)	El Paso Locomotive FC	Herriman, UT
2:00 PM	Schmitt (yellow card) 21'; Ryden 48'; Portillo (yellow card) 88'; Mulholland (yellow card) 90+4'; Holt (yellow card) 116', (goal) 120'	Report	Fox 45+1'; Kiffe (yellow card) 47' (yellow-red card) 51'; Gómez (yellow card) 71'	Stadium: Zions Bank Stadium; Attendance: 4,521; Referee: Rosendo Mendoza; Assistant referees: Tom Felice; Diego Blas; Fourth official: Elton Garcia

=== U.S. Open Cup ===
As a member of the USL Championship, El Paso entered the tournament in the Second Round.

May 15 Second Round	El Paso Locomotive FC	0–3	Forward Madison FC	El Paso, TX
7:00 PM		Report	Barriga Toyama 19'; Díaz 26'; Michaud 76'	Stadium: Southwest University Park; Referee: Marco Vega
