= 2020 Real Monarchs season =

Real Monarchs
2020 season
- Head coach: Jámison Olave
- Stadium: Zions Bank Stadium; Herriman, Utah
- USL: Group C: 4th Western Conf.: 14th
- USL Playoffs: Did not qualify
- Four Corners Cup: Cancelled
- Average home league attendance: 499
- Biggest win: SLC 4–1 COS (Sept. 9)
- Biggest defeat: SLC 0–4 ELP (Oct. 4)

The 2020 Real Monarchs season was the sixth season for Real Monarchs in the United Soccer League Championship, the second-tier professional soccer league in the United States and Canada.

== Roster ==
=== Players ===
As of February 7, 2020

No.	Position	Player	Nation
1	GK	USA	David Ochoa
2	DF	TTO	Alvin Jones
3	DF	CAN	Ashtone Morgan
19	MF	ENG	Luke Mulholland
20	DF	USA	Erik Holt
23	FW	USA	Milan Iloski
27	FW	MEX	Julián Vázquez
40	DF	USA	James Moberg
41	FW	USA	Joe Gallardo
42	DF	USA	Taylor Peay
44	FW	USA	Christopher Bermudez
46	FW	USA	Damian German
48	MF	SCO	Jack Blake
49	MF	PAN	Ricardo Ávila (on loan from Universitario)
52	FW	PUR	Devin Vega
53	DF	TTO	Noah Powder
54	MF	USA	Sam Brown
55	GK	USA	Jimmy Slayton
56	DF	USA	Michael Wetungu
57	FW	USA	Kyle Coffee
58	FW	CAN	Dayonn Harris
59	DF	ARG	Nicolás Giménez
60	MF	MEX	Arturo Rodríguez (on loan from North Texas SC)
62	MF	USA	Jordan Pena
63	DF	USA	Steve Jasso

Signed to first team contract with Real Salt Lake.
Real Salt Lake Academy player.

== Competitive ==
=== USL Championship ===
==== Standings — Group C ====
Pos	Team	Pld	W	D	L	GF	GA	GD	Pts	PPG	Qualification
1	El Paso Locomotive FC	16	9	5	2	24	14	+10	32	2.00	Advance to USL Championship Playoffs
2	New Mexico United	15	8	3	4	23	17	+6	27	1.80	Advance to USL Championship Playoffs
3	Colorado Springs Switchbacks FC	16	2	7	7	19	28	−9	13	0.81	
4	Real Monarchs	16	3	2	11	14	25	−11	11	0.69	

Source: USL

==== Match results ====
March 7 1	San Antonio FC	1–0	Real Monarchs	San Antonio, Texas
6:30 p.m. MST	Di Renzo (yellow card) 33'; Smith (yellow card) 38'; Montgomery 67'	Report	Holt (yellow card) 14'; Mulholland (yellow card) 23'; Powder (yellow card) 56' (yellow-red card) 90+3'; Morgan (yellow card) 66'	Stadium: Toyota Field; Attendance: 7,020; Referee: Chris Ruska

July 11 2	Real Monarchs	0–1	San Diego Loyal SC	Sandy, Utah
2:00 PM MDT	R. Sierakowski (yellow card) 57'	Report	Stoneman 17'; Avila (yellow card) 40'; Zizzo (yellow card) 63'; Martin (yellow card) 77'; Alvarez (yellow card) 90+7'	Stadium: Rio Tinto Stadium; Attendance: 816; Referee: Brad Jensen

July 18 3 Four Corners Cup	Real Monarchs	3–3	Colorado Springs Switchbacks FC	Sandy, Utah
2:00 PM MDT	Coffee 30'; Brody 40'; Farnsworth (yellow card) 49'; Peay 61'	Report	Cervós 45+3'; Lewis (yellow card) 51' (yellow-red card) 73'; Burt 89'; Rwatubyaye 90+5', (yellow card) 90+5'	Stadium: Rio Tinto Stadium; Attendance: 505; Referee: Michael Radchuk

August 1 4 Four Corners Cup	Colorado Springs Switchbacks FC	1–2	Real Monarchs	Colorado Springs, Colorado
6:00 PM MDT	Burt (yellow card) 2'; Lebese 57' (pen.); Diz Pe (yellow card) 90+2'	Report	Blake 35' (pen.); Davis (yellow card) 67'; Peay 90+3'; Sierakowski (yellow card) 90+5'	Stadium: Weidner Field; Attendance: 1,000; Referee: Malik Badawi

August 15 5	Real Monarchs	0–1	El Paso Locomotive FC	Herriman, Utah
8:00 PM MDT	Brown (yellow card) 44'; Moberg (yellow card) 65'; Blake (yellow card) 76'; Powder (yellow card) 80'	Report	Herrera (yellow card) 34'; Ross 50'; Ketterer (yellow card) 89'	Stadium: Zions Bank Stadium; Attendance: 522; Referee: Brad Jensen

August 19 6 Four Corners Cup	Real Monarchs	0–2	New Mexico United	Herriman, Utah
8:00 PM MDT	Powder (yellow card) 45+3'	Report	Ryden 38'; Muhammad (yellow card) 42'; Williams (yellow card) 42'; Moreno 68'	Stadium: Zions Bank Stadium; Attendance: 465; Referee: Matthew Thompson

August 22 7 Four Corners Cup	Real Monarchs	1–2	New Mexico United	Herriman, Utah
8:00 PM MDT	Sierakowski 53'	Report	Moreno 5', (yellow card) 45'; Tetteh (yellow card) 29'; Wehan 48'; Guzmán (yellow card) 55'; Ryden (yellow card) 87'	Stadium: Zions Bank Stadium; Attendance: 570; Referee: Lukasz Szpala

August 29 8	El Paso Locomotive FC	2–1	Real Monarchs	El Paso, Texas
7:30 PM MDT	Rebellón (yellow card) 24', (goal) 86'; Zola (yellow card) 49'; Kallman 53'	Report	Blake (yellow card) 24'; Powder (yellow card) 34'; Coffee 81'	Stadium: Southwest University Park; Attendance: 801; Referee: Elton García

September 4 9	Real Monarchs	1–0	Tacoma Defiance	Herriman, Utah
8:00 PM MDT	Arriaga 26'; Davis (yellow card) 90+6'	Report		Stadium: Zions Bank Stadium; Attendance: 431; Referee: Brandon Stevis

September 9 10 Four Corners Cup	Real Monarchs	4–1	Colorado Springs Switchbacks FC	Herriman, Utah
8:00 PM MDT	Vázquez 18'; Brown 26'; Davis 69'; Powder 76'	Report	Daniels 88', (yellow card) 34'	Stadium: Zions Bank Stadium; Referee: Brad Jensen

September 12 11 Four Corners Cup	Real Monarchs	0–2	New Mexico United	Herriman, Utah
12:00 PM MDT	Giménez (yellow card) 23'; Vázquez (yellow card) 54'; Moberg (yellow card) 66'	Report	Tinari (yellow card) 30'; Moreno 40', 65'; Guzmán (yellow card) 90+2'	Stadium: Zions Bank Stadium; Attendance: 368; Referee: Elvis Osmanovic

September 16 12	Real Monarchs	1–2	Portland Timbers 2	Herriman, Utah
8:00 PM MDT	Coffee 28'; Jasso (yellow card) 53'	Report	Epps 60', (yellow card) 86'; González Asensi 79'; Molloy (yellow card) 85'	Stadium: Zions Bank Stadium; Attendance: 419; Referee: Malik Badawi

September 19 13	El Paso Locomotive FC	1–0	Real Monarchs	El Paso, Texas
7:30 PM MDT	Borelli 45+3'; Ryan (yellow card) 79'	Report	Blake (yellow card) 47'; Moberg (yellow card) 78'; Ávila (yellow card) 87'; Brown (yellow card) 89'	Stadium: Southwest University Park; Attendance: 1,519; Referee: Ismir Pekmic

September 26 14 Four Corners Cup	Colorado Springs Switchbacks FC	1–1	Real Monarchs	Colorado Springs, Colorado
6:00 PM MDT	Volesky (yellow card) 11', (goal) 42' (pen.); Cervós (yellow card) 45'	Report	Davis 21'; Brown (yellow card) 47'	Stadium: Weidner Field; Attendance: 700; Referee: Adam Kilpatrick

September 30 15 Four Corners Cup	Real Monarchs	0–1	New Mexico United	Herriman, Utah
7:30 PM MDT	Flores (yellow card) 17'; Moberg (yellow card) 23'; Ávila (yellow card) 29'; Jasso (yellow card) 62'	Report	Bruce (yellow card) 27'; Muhammad (yellow card) 38'; Ryden (yellow card) 46'; Ahlinvi 57'	Stadium: Zions Bank Stadium; Attendance: 396; Referee: Chris Ruska

October 4 16	Real Monarchs	0–4	El Paso Locomotive FC	Herriman, Utah
2:00 PM MDT	Davis (yellow card) 48'; Jasso (yellow card) 50'; Giménez (yellow card) 86'; Flores (yellow card) 90+3'	Report	Mares 8'; Gómez 68'; King (yellow card) 70'; Robinson 78', 87'; Diaz (yellow card) 83'	Stadium: Zions Bank Stadium; Attendance: 343; Referee: Brad Jensen

=== U.S. Open Cup ===
Due to their ownership by a higher division professional club (Real Salt Lake), Real Monarchs is one of 15 teams expressly forbidden from entering the Cup competition.
