= 2022 Indy Eleven season =

Indy Eleven
2022 season
- Owner: List: Brian Bauer Don Gottwald Shane Hageman Jeffrey Laborsky Fred Merritt Ersal Ozdemir Quinn Ricker Chris Traylor
- Head coach: Mark Lowry
- USL Championship: Eastern Conference: 12th
- USLC Playoffs: DNQ
- U.S. Open Cup: Second Round
Home colors	Away colors

The 2022 Indy Eleven season was the club's ninth season of existence, their ninth consecutive season in the second tier of American soccer, and their fifth season in the USL Championship, the second tier of American soccer.

Heading into the 2022 season, the Eleven had undergone a notable coaching change, dismissing Martin Rennie, the longest tenured head coach of Indy Eleven at the time of his dismissal, and had been coaching the club since the Eleven left the second incarnation of the NASL for the USL in 2018. Rennie was replaced by new head coach Mark Lowry, who had previously coached the Jacksonville Armada and El Paso Locomotive.

== Roster ==
As of November 9, 2022

No.	Pos.	Nation	Player
0	GK	USA	Sean Lewis
1	GK	USA	Tim Trilk
2	DF	USA	Jesús Vázquez
3	DF	USA	A. J. Cochran
4	DF	HAI	Mechack Jérôme
5	DF	USA	Jared Timmer
6	MF	USA	Sam Brown
8	MF	USA	Raul Aguilera
9	FW	VEN	Manuel Arteaga
10	MF	NOR	Jonas Fjeldberg
13	FW	USA	Aris Briggs
14	FW	GHA	Solomon Asante
15	DF	TTO	Neveal Hackshaw
17	FW	PAN	Juan Tejada
18	MF	USA	Alann Torres
19	FW	SLE	Rodney Michael
20	DF	CAN	Karl Ouimette
22	DF	USA	Robby Dambrot
23	MF	USA	Justin Ingram
24	GK	USA	Hayden Vostal
25	MF	COL	Bryam Rebellón
26	GK	USA	Tor Saunders
29	FW	BRA	Stéfano Pinho
35	MF	USA	Diego Sanchez
37	DF	USA	Ecris Revolorio
39	FW	USA	Luca Iaccino
44	DF	GRN	Alexander McQueen

1. USL Academy Contract

== Competitions ==
=== USL Championship ===
==== Standings ====
Pos	Team	Pld	W	L	T	GF	GA	GD	Pts	Qualification
7	Detroit City FC	34	14	8	12	44	30	+14	54	Playoffs
8	FC Tulsa	34	12	16	6	48	58	−10	42	
9	Indy Eleven	34	12	17	5	41	55	−14	41	
10	Hartford Athletic	34	10	18	6	47	57	−10	36	
11	Loudoun United FC	34	8	22	4	36	74	−38	28	

Source: USL Championship Standings
Rules for classification: 1) head-to-head points; 2) head-to-head goal differential; 3) points-per game within conference; 4) total wins; 5) total goal differential; 6) total goals scored; 7) points earned against top four Conference finishers; 8) disciplinary points; 9) coin toss or drawing of lots

==== Match results ====
On January 12, 2022, the USL Championship released the regular season schedule for all 27 clubs.

March 12 1	Loudoun United	1–0	Indy Eleven	Leesburg, VA
5:45 EDT	Smith 43' (yellow card) 90+5'; Greene (yellow card) 62'; Hope-Gund (yellow card) 70'; Lillard (yellow card) 84'	Report	Hackshaw (yellow card) 20'; Briggs (yellow card) 87'; McQueen (red card) 90'	Stadium: Segra Field; Attendance: 1,031; Referee: John Matto

March 19 2	Tampa Bay Rowdies	2–0	Indy Eleven	St. Petersburg, FL
7:30 EDT	Tejada 1'; Scarlett (yellow card) 11'; Wyke (yellow card) 39'; Guillén (yellow card) 45+1'; LaCava 51'; Etou (yellow card) 76'	Report	Aguilera (yellow card) 18' (yellow-red card) 59'; Stéfano Pinho (yellow card) 53'	Stadium: Al Lang Stadium; Attendance: 5,192; Referee: Jeremy Scheer

March 26 3	Louisville City FC	1–1	Indy Eleven	Louisville, KY
7:30 PM EDT	Totsch 53'; Ownby (yellow card) 84'; Dia (yellow card) 89'	Report	Pinho 22'; Timmer (yellow card) 34'; Briggs (yellow card) 86'	Stadium: Lynn Family Stadium; Attendance: 8,551; Referee: Eric Tattersall; Assistant referees: Justin Howard; Mike Nickerson; Fourth official: Nabil Bensalah

April 2 4	Indy Eleven	1–1	LA Galaxy II	Indianapolis, IN
7:00 PM EDT	Fjeldberg (yellow card) 12'; Aguilera 61'; Ingram (yellow card) 74'	Report	Drack (yellow card) 11'; Salazar 35'; Judd (yellow card) 39'	Stadium: Michael A. Carroll Stadium; Attendance: 8,037; Referee: Nabil Bensalah

April 9 5	Rio Grande Valley FC Toros	1–2	Indy Eleven	Edinburg, Texas
8:30 PM EDT	Nodarse (yellow card) 26'; Ruiz (yellow card) 73'; López (yellow card) 76' (goal) 83'	Report	Rebellón (yellow card) 35'; Pinho (yellow card) 40' (goal) 69', 78'; McQueen (yellow card) 58'; Aguilera (yellow card) 90'	Stadium: H-E-B Park; Attendance: 3,357; Referee: Gerald Flores

April 16 6	Indy Eleven	2–1	Atlanta United 2	Indianapolis, IN
7:00 PM EDT	Law 12'; Cochran (yellow card) 14'; Brown (yellow card) 27'; Fjeldberg (yellow card) 29'; Briggs 90+2'	Report	Chukwuma (yellow card) 10'; Conway 68'; Howard (yellow card) 90+5'	Stadium: Michael A. Carroll Stadium; Attendance: 5,906; Referee: Calin Radosav

April 24 7	Indy Eleven	3–1	Orange County SC	Indianapolis, IN
5:30 PM EDT	Powder 54', (yellow card) 55'; Pinho 65'; Aguilera (yellow card) 89'; Briggs	Report	Kuningas 13'; Henry (yellow card) 45+3'	Stadium: Michael A. Carroll Stadium; Attendance: 5,736; Referee: Elijio Arreguin

April 30 8	Indy Eleven	1–0	Hartford Athletic	Indianapolis, IN
7:00 PM EDT	Aguilera (yellow card) 21'; Ayoze 40'; Cochran (yellow card) 74'; Fjeldberg (yellow card) 90+1'	Report	Johnson (yellow card) 38'; Boudadi (yellow card) 50'	Stadium: Michael A. Carroll Stadium; Attendance: 4,695; Referee: Greg Dopka

May 14 9	Memphis 901 FC	2–1	Indy Eleven	Memphis, TN
8:00 PM EDT	Carroll 34'; Paul (yellow card) 45'; Kissiedou 58'; Seagrist (yellow card) 68'	Report	Hackshaw (yellow card) 42'; Fjeldberg 66'; Ingram (yellow card) 74'; Law (yellow card) 80'	Stadium: Autozone Park; Attendance: 3,515; Referee: Matthew Thompson

May 21 10	Indy Eleven	2–0	New York Red Bulls II	Indianapolis, IN
7:00 PM EDT	Castillo 30' (o.g.); Fjeldberg 43'	Report		Stadium: Michael A. Carroll Stadium; Attendance: 6,217; Referee: Kevin Fikar

May 28 11	Indy Eleven	1–2	New Mexico United	Indianapolis, IN
4:00 PM EDT	Arteaga (yellow card) 35'; Stéfano Pinho 80'	Report	Portillo 38'; Jérôme 63' (o.g.); Kiesewetter (yellow card) 90+4'	Stadium: Michael A. Carroll Stadium; Attendance: 6,915; Referee: Elvis Osmanovic

June 4 12	Charleston Battery	3–4	Indy Eleven	Mt. Pleasant, SC
7:00 PM EDT	Williams 35', 90+2'; Johnson 89'	Report	Pinho 21'; Arteaga 25', 28', 37'	Stadium: Patriots Point Soccer Complex; Attendance: 1,849; Referee: Chris Ruska

June 8 13	Miami FC	1–1	Indy Eleven	Miami, FL
7:00 PM EDT	Sorto 15'; Walker (yellow card) 36'; Chapman-Page (yellow card) 40'; Valot (yellow card) 60'; Parkes (yellow card) 90+2'	Report	Arteaga (yellow card) 22'; Aguilera (yellow card) 38'; Pinho 55'	Stadium: Riccardo Silva Stadium; Attendance: 850; Referee: John Matto

June 18 14	Colorado Springs Switchbacks FC	4–3	Indy Eleven	Colorado Springs, CO
9:00 PM EDT	Ngalina 17', 69'; Barry 45+1' (pen.); Zandi 66'	Report	Arteaga (yellow card) 22'; Aguilera (yellow card) 38'; Pinho 55'	Stadium: Weidner Field; Attendance: 8,023; Referee: Elijio Arreguin

June 25 15	San Diego Loyal SC	5–0	Indy Eleven	San Diego, CA
10:00 PM EDT	Amang 29'; Vassell 42', 52'; Jérôme 60' (o.g.); Moshobane 85'	Report		Stadium: Weidner Field; Attendance: 5,078; Referee: Matthew Corrigan

July 2 16	Indy Eleven	0–1	Miami FC	Indianapolis, IN
7:30 PM EDT	Law (yellow card) 12'; Arteaga (yellow card) 28' (yellow-red card) 90+4'; Brown (yellow card) 46'	Report	Pérez (yellow card) 24', (goal) 58'; Chapman-Page (yellow card) 28'; Stanley (yellow card) 38'; Walker (yellow card) 41'	Stadium: Michael A. Carroll Stadium; Attendance: 8,008; Referee: Nabil Bensalah

July 6 17	Pittsburgh Riverhounds SC	1–0	Indy Eleven	Pittsburgh, PA
7:00 PM EDT	Dikwa Lega 79'	Report		Stadium: Highmark Stadium; Attendance: 2,155; Referee: Matthew Corrigan

July 9 18	Indy Eleven	0–1	Detroit City FC	Indianapolis, IN
7:00 PM EDT	Ingram (yellow card) 56'; Arteaga (yellow card) 68'; Aguilera (yellow card) 83'	Report	Rutz 5'; Bryant (yellow card) 42'; Dunwell (yellow card) 70'; Williams (yellow card) 90+3'	Stadium: Michael A. Carroll Stadium; Attendance: 9,462; Referee: Benjamin Meyer

July 15 19	New York Red Bulls II	1–0	Indy Eleven	Montclair, NJ
7:00 PM EDT	Rafanello 53'	Report		Stadium: MSU Soccer Park; Attendance: 424; Referee: Melvin Rivas

July 23 20	Indy Eleven	1–1	Memphis 901 FC	Indianapolis, IN
7:00 PM EDT	Asante 9'; Aguilera (yellow card) 24'; Brown (yellow card) 79'; Cochran (yellow card) 90'; Hackshaw (yellow card) 90+1'	Report	Smith (yellow card) 14'; Goodrum 23'; Fernando (yellow card) 43'	Stadium: Michael A. Carroll Stadium; Attendance: 9,020; Referee: Natalie Simon

July 30 21	Indy Eleven	1–3	Tampa Bay Rowdies	Indianapolis, IN
19:00 EDT	Aguilera 24', (yellow card) 34'; Tejada (yellow card) 54'; Ayoze (yellow card) 80'; Rebellón (yellow card) 82'; Rivera (yellow card) 90+1'	Report	Law (yellow card) 16'; Dos Santos (penalty scored) 32', (yellow card) 50'; Scarlett 45'; Fernandes (penalty scored) 90+6'	Stadium: Michael A. Carroll Stadium; Attendance: 10,074; Referee: Joshua Encarnación

August 6 22	Indy Eleven	0–2	Pittsburgh Riverhounds SC	Indianapolis, IN
7:00 EDT		Report	Cicerone 13', 52'; Ybarra (yellow card) 44' (yellow-red card) 54'	Stadium: Michael A. Carroll Stadium; Attendance: 9,839; Referee: Eric Tattersall

August 13 23	Hartford Athletic	2–1	Indy Eleven	Hartford, CN
7:00 PM EDT	Barrera 19', (yellow card) 53'; Martínez 26'	Report	Dambrot (yellow card) 33'; Hackshaw (yellow card) 43'; Ayoze 45+2' (pen.); Rivera (yellow card) 84'	Stadium: Trinity Health Stadium; Attendance: 4,924; Referee: Benjamin Meyer

August 20 24	FC Tulsa	1–0	Indy Eleven	Tulsa, Oklahoma
8:30 PM EDT	Machuca 90'	Report		Stadium: ONEOK Field; Attendance: 5,082; Referee: Elton García

August 27 25	Indy Eleven	1–0	San Antonio FC	Indianapolis, IN
7:00 PM EDT	Tejada (yellow card) 14'; Dambrot 40'; Brown (yellow card) 45+4'; Trilk (yellow card) 90+8'	Report	Khmiri (yellow card) 79'; Abu (yellow card) 86'	Stadium: Michael A. Carroll Stadium; Attendance: 10,081; Referee: Calin Radosav

August 31 26	Indy Eleven	2–1	Louisville City FC	Indianapolis, Indiana
7:00 PM EDT	Pinho (yellow card) 12', (goal) 28', 78' (pen.); Dambrot (yellow card) 45+6'; Hackshaw (yellow card) 68'; Ingram (yellow card) 85'	Report	Serrano 8'; Moguel (yellow card) 13'; Gonzalez (yellow card) 24'; Charpie (yellow card) 57'	Stadium: Carroll Stadium; Attendance: 8,275; Referee: Elvis Osmanovic; Assistant referees: Nicholas Balcer; Eric del Rosario; Fourth official: Youssef Elmessoussi

September 3 27	Detroit City FC	0–0	Indy Eleven	Hamtramck, MI
7:30 PM EDT	Williams (yellow card) 33'; Hoppenot (yellow card) 88'	Report	Michael (yellow card) 43'; Trilk (yellow card) 90+5'; Vázquez (yellow card) 90+7'	Stadium: Keyworth Stadium; Attendance: 6,078; Referee: Brandon Stevis

September 10 28	Indy Eleven	4–3	Birmingham Legion FC	Indianapolis, IN
7:00 PM EDT	Hackshaw 11', 16'; Tejada 31'; Pinho 78'	Report	Martínez 35'; Lopes 62', 71'	Stadium: Michael A. Carroll Stadium; Attendance: 10,104; Referee: Jeremy Scheer

September 17 29	Monterey Bay FC	5–0	Indy Eleven	Seaside, California
10:00 PM EDT	Boone (yellow card) 28', (goal) 31'; Dambrot 43' (o.g.); Murphy 49'; Gleadle 50'; Volesky 66'; Gorskie (yellow card) 21'	Report	Timmer (yellow card) 40'; Dambrot (yellow card) 55'; Tejada (yellow card) 62'; McQueen (yellow card) 79'	Stadium: Cardinale Stadium; Attendance: 3,804; Referee: Gerald Flores

September 25 30	Indy Eleven	1–0	Loudoun United FC	Indianapolis, IN
7:00 EDT	Rebellón (yellow card) 41'; Ayoze García (penalty scored) 68'; Arteaga (yellow card) 81'; Aguilera (yellow card) 87'	Report	Landry (yellow card) 37'; Smith (yellow card) 44'; Robinson (yellow card) 90+6'; Greene (yellow card) 90+7'	Stadium: Michael A. Carroll Stadium; Attendance: 8,575; Referee: Austin Saini

September 28 31	Atlanta United 2	0–1	Indy Eleven	Kennesaw, GA
7:30 PM EDT	Tiente (yellow card) 28'; Centeno (yellow card) 56'; Carleton (yellow card) 88'	Report	Dambrot 23'; Revolorio (yellow card) 40'	Stadium: Fifth Third Bank Stadium; Attendance: 693; Referee: Alyssa Nichols

October 1 32	Indy Eleven	2–4	FC Tulsa	Indianapolis, IN
7:00 PM EDT	García 24', 55' (pen.); Rebellón (yellow card) 45'; Rivera (yellow card) 76'; Brown (yellow card) 90+4'	Report	Sowinski (yellow card) 5', (goal) 17', 48', 62'; Bird (yellow card) 31'; Suárez 45+5' (pen.); C. Pearson (yellow card) 50'; Epps (yellow card) 76'; Powder (yellow card) 79'	Stadium: Michael A. Carroll Stadium; Attendance: 9,633; Referee: Danielle Chesky

October 8 33	Indy Eleven	4–1	Charleston Battery	Indianapolis, IN
7:00 PM EDT	Cochran 40'; Pinho 47', 64'; Asensio 71' (o.g.)	Report	Williams 18'	Stadium: Michael A. Carroll Stadium; Attendance: 10,272; Referee: Cristian Campo

October 12 34	Birmingham Legion FC	3–1	Indy Eleven	Birmingham, Alabama
6:00 PM EDT	Martínez 25'; Prosper 29'; Lopes 61' (pen.)	Report	Hackshaw (yellow card) 45+1' (yellow-red card); Pinho 83'	Stadium: Protective Stadium; Referee: John Griggs

==== USL Cup Playoffs ====
The top seven teams in each USL Championship conference qualified for the 2022 USL Championship playoffs. By placing ninth in the Eastern Conference, Indy Eleven missed qualifying for the playoffs by fourteen points.

=== U.S. Open Cup ===
As a member of the USL Championship, Indy Eleven entered the U.S. Open Cup in the Second Round, matched up at home against third-division MLS Next Pro club St. Louis City 2, the reserve club of first-division MLS club St. Louis City SC. At home, the Eleven lost against the third-division club 20.

April 5	Indy Eleven (USLC) (Indiana)	0–2	(Missouri) St. Louis City 2 (MLSNP)	Indianapolis, Indiana
7:30 pm EDT		Report	Armstrong 18'; Kuzain 72'	Stadium: Carroll Stadium; Referee: Carlos Rodriguez

== See also ==
- Indy Eleven
- 2022 in American soccer
- 2022 USL Championship season
