= 2023 Indy Eleven season =

Indy Eleven
2023 season
- Owner: List: Brian Bauer Don Gottwald Shane Hageman Jeffrey Laborsky Fred Merritt Ersal Ozdemir Quinn Ricker Chris Traylor
- Head coach: Mark Lowry
- Stadium: Carroll Stadium
- USL Championship: Eastern Conference: 6th
- USL Playoffs: Conference quarterfinals
- U.S. Open Cup: Third round
Home colors	Away colors

The 2023 Indy Eleven season was the club's tenth season of existence, their tenth consecutive season in the second tier of American soccer, and their sixth season in the USL Championship. The team also participated in the U.S. Open Cup, exiting in the Third Round after losing late against MLS' Columbus Crew.

Following the end of the season, head coach Mark Lowry left the club after having served two seasons with the club, and leading Indy Eleven to their first playoff appearance since 2019.

== Roster ==
As of October 26, 2023

Squad No.	Name	Nationality	Position(s)	Date of birth (age)
Goalkeepers
1	Tim Trilk	(United States)	GK	August 15, 1998 (age 28)
24	Hayden Vostal	(United States)	GK	October 18, 2005 (age 20)
28	Yannik Oettl	(Germany)	GK	April 25, 2002 (age 24)
46	Cayden Crawford	(United States)	GK	September 29, 2006 (age 19)
Defenders
2	Jesús Vázquez	(United States)	DF	March 22, 1995 (age 31)
4	Mechack Jerome	(Haiti)	DF	April 21, 1990 (age 36)
5	Callum Chapman-Page	(England)	DF	November 6, 1995 (age 30)
15	Adrian Diz Pe	(Cuba)	DF	March 4, 1994 (age 32)
22	Robert Dambrot	(United States)	DF	October 19, 1994 (age 31)
23	Younes Boudadi	(Morocco)	DF	January 23, 1996 (age 30)
44	Macauley King	(England)	DF	October 4, 1995 (age 30)
77	Gustavo Rissi	(Brazil)	DF	February 4, 1998 (age 28)
-	Ben Reveno	(United States)	DF	March 29, 1999 (age 27)
Midfielders
6	Cameron Lindley	(United States)	MF	July 18, 1997 (age 29)
7	Sebastián Velásquez	(Colombia)	MF	September 7, 2005 (age 21)
8	Jack Blake	(Scotland)	MF	September 22, 1994 (age 31)
10	Harrison Robledo	(United States)	MF	February 2, 2002 (age 24)
12	Diego Sanchez	(United States)	MF	December 12, 2004 (age 21)
14	Aodhan Quinn	(United States)	MF	March 22, 1992 (age 34)
25	Bryam Rebellón	(Colombia)	MF	January 22, 1992 (age 34)
32	Benjamin Chavarria III	(United States)	MF	September 7, 2005 (age 21)
-	Grayson Elmquist	(United States)	MF	February 9, 2005 (age 21)
Forwards
13	Sebastián Guenzatti	(Uruguay)	FW	July 8, 1991 (age 35)
20	Solomon Asante	(Ghana)	FW	March 6, 1990 (age 36)
29	Stefano Pinho	(Brazil)	FW	January 12, 1991 (age 35)
39	Luca Iaccino	(United States)	FW	March 20, 2003 (age 23)
42	Douglas Martínez	(Honduras)	FW	June 5, 1997 (age 29)
50	Roberto Molina	(El Salvador)	FW	January 28, 2001 (age 25)

== Non-competitive ==
=== Preseason ===
February 10 Preseason	Indy Eleven	1–3	Butler Bulldogs
		Report

February 14 Preseason	Indy Eleven	5–1	Indiana Wesleyan Wildcats
		Report

February 19 Preseason	Indy Eleven	5–1	Chicago Fire FC II
		Report

February 25 Preseason	Chicago Fire FC	3–0	Indy Eleven
		Report

March 3 Preseason	Indy Eleven	1–0	Forward Madison FC
		Report

== Competitive ==
=== USL Championship ===
==== Standings ====
On January 9, 2023, Indy Eleven released their full season schedule.

Pos	Team	Pld	W	L	T	GF	GA	GD	Pts	Qualification
1	Pittsburgh Riverhounds SC (S)	34	19	5	10	50	29	+21	67	Playoffs
2	Tampa Bay Rowdies	34	19	9	6	60	39	+21	63	Playoffs
3	Charleston Battery	34	17	9	8	47	43	+4	59	Playoffs
4	Memphis 901 FC	34	14	10	10	59	53	+6	52	Playoffs
5	Louisville City FC	34	14	12	8	41	44	−3	50	Playoffs
6	Indy Eleven	34	13	11	10	46	38	+8	49	Playoffs
7	Birmingham Legion FC	34	14	16	4	44	53	−9	46	Playoffs
8	Detroit City FC	34	11	15	8	30	39	−9	41	Playoffs
9	Miami FC	34	11	15	8	43	44	−1	41	
10	FC Tulsa	34	10	15	9	43	55	−12	39	
11	Loudoun United FC	34	7	23	4	36	61	−25	25	
12	Hartford Athletic	34	4	24	6	40	79	−39	18	

Source: USL Championship Standings
Rules for classification: 1) head-to-head points; 2) head-to-head goal differential; 3) points-per game within conference; 4) total wins; 5) total goal differential; 6) total goals scored; 7) points earned against top four Conference finishers; 8) disciplinary points; 9) coin toss or drawing of lots
(S) Players' Shield winner

==== Match results ====
March 11 1	Tampa Bay Rowdies	1–1	Indy Eleven	St. Petersburg, Florida
		Report		Stadium: Al Lang Stadium; Attendance: 6,893

March 25 2	Detroit City FC	0–1	Indy Eleven	Hamtramck, Michigan
4:00 PM EDT	Ballard (yellow card) 16'; Matthews (yellow card) 39' (yellow-red card) 74'; Williams (yellow card) 48'; Carroll (yellow card) 90+6'; Simonsen (yellow card) 90+9'	Report	Boudadi (yellow card) 14'; Asante (yellow card) 21'; Martínez (yellow card) 33'; Rebellón 62'	Stadium: Keyworth Stadium; Attendance: 6,182; Referee: Jervis Atagana

April 1 3	Indy Eleven	0–0	Las Vegas Lights FC	Indianapolis, Indiana
7:00 PM		Report		Stadium: Michael A. Carroll Stadium; Attendance: 9,091; Referee: Calin Radosav

April 8 4	Indy Eleven	0–3	Oakland Roots	Indianapolis, IN
7:00 PM		Report	Klimenta (yellow card) 23' (yellow-red card) 82'; Mfeka 43'; Formella 71'; Rito 78'	Stadium: Michael A. Carroll Stadium; Attendance: 9,334; Referee: Matthew Thompson

April 15 5	Orange County SC	1–0	Indy Eleven	Irvine, California
10:00 PM	Iloski 30'; Jamison (yellow card) 56'; Scott (yellow card) 73'	Report	Diz Pe (yellow card) 23'; Blake (yellow card) 36'	Stadium: Championship Soccer Stadium; Attendance: 3,977; Referee: Ricardo Fierro

April 22 6	Indy Eleven	2–3	Monterey Bay FC	Indianapolis, Indiana
7:00 PM EDT	Asante 23'; Guenzatti 40'; Blake (yellow card) 45+1'; Martínez (yellow card) 78'	Report	Robinson 17'; Volesky 58'; Yoseke 63'; Boone (yellow card) 85'	Stadium: Carroll Stadium; Attendance: 10,038; Referee: Greg Dopka

April 29 7	Indy Eleven	1–1	Pittsburgh Riverhounds SC	Indianapolis, Indiana
7:00 PM EDT		Report		Stadium: Carroll Stadium; Attendance: 10,009; Referee: Jeremy Scheer

May 6 8	Loudoun United	1–2	Indy Eleven	Leesburg, VA
		Report		Stadium: Segra Field; Attendance: 2,214

May 13 9	Sacramento Republic FC	3–1	Indy Eleven	Sacramento, California
		Report		Stadium: Heart Health Park; Attendance: 8,763

May 20 10	Indy Eleven	1–0	Colorado Springs Switchbacks FC	Indianapolis, Indiana
		Report		Stadium: Carroll Stadium; Attendance: 9,688

May 27 11	Indy Eleven	0–1	Louisville City FC	Indianapolis, Indiana
7:00 PM	Lindley (yellow card) 11'; Vázquez (yellow card) 29'; Jérôme (yellow card) 77'; Martínez (yellow card) 84'	Report	Harris 20'; Pouwels (yellow card) 90+3'	Stadium: Carroll Stadium; Attendance: 9,532; Referee: Elvis Osmanovic; Assistant referees: Art Arustamyan; Eric Del Rosario; Fourth official: Jackson Krauser

June 2 12	Charleston Battery	0–4	Indy Eleven	Mount Pleasant, South Carolina
		Report		Stadium: Patriots Point Soccer Complex

June 10 13	Indy Eleven	1–1	Hartford Athletic	Indianapolis, Indiana
7:00 PM EST	Diz Pe (red card) 6'; Lindley (yellow card) 50'; Martínez (yellow card) 64'; Blake 85'; Rissi (red card) 90+3'	Report	Hoppenot (yellow card) 6'; Edwards 11'; Hodge (yellow card) 45+1'; Hodge (yellow card) 49' (yellow-red card); Merrill (yellow card) 58'; Barrera (yellow card) 77'	Stadium: Michael A. Carroll Stadium; Attendance: 9073; Referee: Joshua Encarnación

June 17 14	Birmingham Legion	2–1	Indy Eleven	Birmingham, Alabama
6:30 p.m.	Gabriel Alves (yellow card) 21'; Nwegbo 55'; Crognale (yellow card) 62'; Asiedu (yellow card) 64'; Martínez 89'	Report	Boudadi (yellow card) 8'; Vázquez (yellow card) 24'; Guenzatti 56'	Stadium: Protective Stadium; Attendance: 5,453; Referee: Olvin Oliva

June 24 15	Hartford Athletic	0–2	Indy Eleven	Hartford, Connecticut
7:00 PM EST	Saydee (yellow card) 70'; Rito (yellow card) 87'; Amoh (yellow card) 90+5'	Report	Boudadi (yellow card) 4'; King (yellow card) 49'; Robledo (yellow card) 65'; Lindley 73'; Lindley (yellow card) 74'; Rissi (yellow card) 87'; Martínez 90+5'	Stadium: Trinity Health Stadium; Attendance: 4784; Referee: Amiel Aleman

July 1 16	Indy Eleven	2–2	San Diego Loyal SC	Indianapolis, Indiana
3:55 PM	Dambrot (yellow card) 7'; King (yellow card) 14'; Diz Pe (yellow card) 57'; Rissi (red card) 58'; Quinn 66' 82' (pen.); Lindley (yellow card) 90+12'	Report	Adams 32'; Perez (yellow card) 39'; Conway 54'; Damus (yellow card) 74'; Martin (yellow card) 89'	Stadium: Michael A. Carroll Stadium; Attendance: 9,082; Referee: Matthew Corrigan

July 8 17	Indy Eleven	0-1	FC Tulsa	Indianapolis, Indiana
7:00 p.m. EDT		Report	Dyer 5'	Stadium: IUPUI Carroll Stadium; Attendance: 9,153; Referee: Benjamin Meyer

July 12 18	Indy Eleven	1–1	Charleston Battery	Indianapolis, Indiana
		Report		Stadium: Carroll Stadium; Attendance: 9,059

July 22 19	Indy Eleven	0–0	Charleston Battery	Indianapolis, Indiana
		Report		Stadium: Carroll Stadium; Attendance: 11,117

July 26 20	Pittsburgh Riverhounds SC	1–3	Indy Eleven	Pittsburgh, Pennsylvania
7:00 PM		Report		Stadium: Highmark Stadium; Attendance: 4,218; Referee: Matthew Thompson

July 29 21	Louisville City FC	2–0	Indy Eleven	Louisville, Kentucky
8:00 PM	Wynder 28'; Lancaster 65'	Report	Dambrot (yellow card) 61'; Quinn (yellow card) 67'; Diz (yellow card) 86'; Boudadi (yellow card) 90+4'	Stadium: Lynn Family Stadium; Attendance: 13,248; Referee: Ricardo Fierro; Assistant referees: Matthew Rodman; Stephen Milhoan; Fourth official: Zach McWhorter

August 5 22	Indy Eleven	1–2	Memphis 901 FC	Indianapolis, IN
7:00 PM EDT		Report		Stadium: Michael A. Carroll Stadium; Attendance: 9,194; Referee: Eric Tattersall

August 9 23	Indy Eleven	4–0	Birmingham Legion	Indianapolis
6:00 p.m.	Guenzatti 24', 63'; Martínez (yellow card) 41', (goal) 65'; Molina 89'	Report	Martínez (yellow card) 48'; Nwegbo (yellow card) 49'; Brett (yellow card) 61'; Smith (yellow card) 90+1'	Stadium: Michael A. Carroll Stadium; Attendance: 7,194; Referee: Adam Kilpatrick

August 12 24	Miami FC	0–1	Indy Eleven	Miami, Florida
7:00 PM EDT	Akinyode (yellow card) 12'; Rivas (yellow card) 62'	Report	Boudadi (yellow card) 47'; Diz Pe 51'; Lindley (yellow card) 66'	Stadium: Riccardo Silva Stadium; Attendance: 1,509; Referee: Rubiel Vazquez

August 19 25	El Paso Locomotive FC	2–3	Indy Eleven	El Paso, Texas
10:30 pm EDT	Calvillo 21'; Zacarías (yellow card) 32'; Calvillo (yellow card) 45+3'; Navarro 55'; Díaz (yellow card) 58'	Report	Chapman-Page (yellow card) 45+3', (goal) 64'; Blake (yellow card) 47'; Guenzatti 53'; Martínez 71'	Stadium: Southwest University Park; Attendance: 6,684; Referee: Gerald Flores

August 23 26	Memphis 901 FC	0–0	Indy Eleven	Memphis, TN
8:00 PM EDT		Report		Stadium: AutoZone Park; Attendance: 2,567; Referee: Elvis Osmanovic

August 26 27	Indy Eleven	2–1	Loudoun United	Indianapolis, IN
8:00 PM EDT		Report		Stadium: Michael A. Carroll Stadium; Attendance: 10,137; Referee: Brandon Stevis

September 2 28	Indy Eleven	1–0	Miami FC	Indianapolis, Indiana
7:00 PM EDT	Boudadi (yellow card) 27'; Guenzatti 72'; Robledo (yellow card) 90+2'; Quinn (yellow card) 90+9'	Report	Segbers (yellow card) 20'; Salazar (yellow card) 34'; Akinyode (yellow card) 36'; Stanley (yellow card) 88'; Lewis Neal (yellow card) 89'; Craig (red card) 90+3'	Stadium: Carroll Stadium; Attendance: 10,175; Referee: Elijio Arreguin

September 15 29	New Mexico United	3–2	Indy Eleven	Albuquerque, New Mexico
7:00 PM	Rivas 44'; Hernandez 64'; Portillo 86' (pen.)	Report	Guenzatti 9'; Vázquez 90+4'	Stadium: Isotopes Park; Attendance: 8,527; Referee: Brad Jensen

September 20 30	Phoenix Rising FC	1–1	Indy Eleven	Phoenix, Arizona
7:30 PM MST	Uzochukwu (yellow card) 16'; Arteaga (yellow card) 40'; Fuenmayor (yellow card) 62'; Harvey 80'; Hernández (yellow card) 90+2'	PHX Report; IND Report	Pinho (yellow card) 31'; Blake (yellow card) 75'; Diz Pe 90+5'	Stadium: Phoenix Rising Soccer Stadium; Attendance: 4,674; Referee: Abdou Ndiaye

September 24 31	Indy Eleven	0–1	Rio Grande Valley FC	Indianapolis, Indiana
4:00 pm EDT		Report	López 18'	Stadium: Michael A. Carroll Stadium; Attendance: 10,316; Referee: Thomas Snyder

September 30 32	Indy Eleven	3–0	Detroit City FC	Indianapolis, Indiana
7:00 PM EDT	Martínez 45'; Velásquez (yellow card) 45+2' (goal) 69'; Molina 90+3' (yellow card) 90+7'	Report	Fisher (yellow card) 33'; Diop (yellow card) 74'	Stadium: Michael A. Carroll Stadium; Attendance: 12,351; Referee: Katja Koroleva

October 7 33	FC Tulsa	1–2	Indy Eleven	Tulsa, Oklahoma
8:30 p.m. EDT		Report		Stadium: ONEOK Field; Attendance: 6,444

October 14 34	San Antonio FC	3–3	Indy Eleven	San Antonio, Texas
8:30 PM CDT	Taintor (yellow card) 8', (goal) 87'; Marcina (yellow card) 43'; Patiño 45+4' (pen.); Oluwaseyi 58'; Batista (yellow card) 74'	Report	Blake 9'; Lindley (yellow card) 24'; Martínez (yellow card) 36'; Guenzatti 37'; Boudadi (yellow card) 45+2'; Asante (yellow card) 45+3' (yellow-red card) 61'; Diz Pe 53', (yellow card) 67'; King (yellow card) 90+8'	Stadium: Toyota Field; Attendance: 8,146; Referee: Elijio Arreguin

==== USL Championship Playoffs ====
Entering the 2023 USL Championship playoffs, Indy Eleven was scheduled away against the Charleston Battery after clinching their first playoff spot since 2019. In the Conference Quarterfinals, Indy Eleven were blown out by the eventual runner-ups 5–0.

===== Playoff results =====
October 22 Conference Quarter-final	Charleston Battery	5–0	Indy Eleven	Mount Pleasant, South Carolina
4:00 PM EDT	Ycaza 12' (yellow card) 90'; Williams (yellow card) 16' (goal) 37'; Rodríguez 40'; Barajas 47'; Markanich 63'	Report	Boudadi (yellow card) 57'; Vázquez (yellow card) 72'; Diz Pe (yellow card) 76'; Lindley (yellow card) 83'	Stadium: Patriots Point Soccer Complex; Attendance: 2,972; Referee: Jeremy Scheer

=== U.S. Open Cup ===
As members of the USL Championship, Indy Eleven entered the U.S. Open Cup in the Second Round, matched up at home against third-division National Independent Soccer Association club Michigan Stars FC. After scoring twice in added extra time to move on in the Open Cup, Indy Eleven was matched up against first-division club Columbus Crew of the MLS, to which they'd lose to 10 away in Columbus.

==== Match results ====
April 5 Second Round	Indy Eleven (USLC) (Indiana)	3–1 (a.e.t.)	(Michigan) Michigan Stars FC (NISA)	Indianapolis, Indiana
7:00 PM EDT	Robledo 59'; Diz 92'; Tejada 106'	Report	Popovic 47'	Stadium: Michael A. Carroll Stadium; Attendance: 1,807; Referee: Alex Beehler

April 26 Third Round	Columbus Crew (MLS) (Ohio)	1–0	(Indiana) Indy Eleven (USLC)	Columbus, Ohio
7:30 PM EDT	Farsi 83'	Report		Stadium: Lower.com Field; Attendance: 2,000; Referee: Nabil Bensalah

== See also ==
- Indy Eleven
- List of Indy Eleven seasons
- 2023 in American soccer
- 2023 USL Championship season
