= 2022 Atlanta United 2 season =

Atlanta United 2
2022 season
- Owner: Arthur Blank
- President: Darren Eales
- Head coach: Jack Collison
- Stadium: Fifth Third Bank Stadium
- USL Championship: TBD
- Highest home attendance: League/All: 749 (5/27 v. OC)
- Lowest home attendance: League/All: 339 (6/11 v. LDN)
- Average home league attendance: 558
- Biggest win: ATL 4–1 CHS (3/27)
- Biggest defeat: SA 5–0 ATL (7/16)
Home colors

The 2022 Atlanta United 2 season was the team's fifth year of existence as well as their fifth and final season in the USL Championship, the second tier of the American soccer pyramid.

== Players ==
As of October 22, 2022.
The squad of Atlanta United 2 will be composed of an unrestricted number of first-team players on loan to the reserve team, players signed to ATLUTD2, and Atlanta United Academy players. Academy players who appear in matches with ATLUTD2 will retain their college eligibility.

Contracted players
No.	Position	Nation	Player
4	MF	NGA	Emenike Nwogu
6	DF	NGA	Nelson Orji
8	MF	TRI	Ajani Fortune
10	MF	VEN	Darwin Matheus
11	MF	PER	David Mejía
12	DF	BRA	Raimar
21	FW	USA	Tristan Trager
23	GK	CHI	Vicente Reyes
29	MF	BRA	Nicolas Firmino
37	MF	USA	Jonantan Villal
39	DF	USA	Noah Cobb
55	MF	CMR	Toni Tiente

First team players who have been loaned to ATLUTD2
No.	Position	Player	Nation
2	DF	USA	Aiden McFadden
3	DF	USA	Alex DeJohn
25	GK	USA	Justin Garces
27	DF	USA	Bryce Washington
30	MF	SSD	Machop Chol
31	MF	USA	Erik Centeno
33	DF	USA	Mikey Ambrose
35	DF	USA	Efrain Morales
36	FW	USA	Jackson Conway

Academy call-ups
No.	Position	Player	Nat.
40	DF	USA	Mathieu Brick
41	MF	USA	Luke Brennan
43	DF	USA	Nigel Prince
44	MF	USA	Cristiano Bruletti
45	MF	USA	Pavel Romero
46	DF	USA	Grant Howard
48	MF	USA	Alan Carleton
49	GK	USA	Nash Skoglund
56	DF	TRI	Andrew de Gannes

== Competitions ==
=== League table ===
Pos	Team	Pld	W	L	T	GF	GA	GD	Pts	Qualification
1	Louisville City FC	34	22	6	6	65	28	+37	72	Qualification for the Conference Semifinals
2	Memphis 901 FC	34	21	8	5	67	33	+34	68	Playoffs
3	Tampa Bay Rowdies	34	20	7	7	73	33	+40	67	Playoffs
4	Birmingham Legion FC	34	17	10	7	56	37	+19	58	Playoffs
5	Pittsburgh Riverhounds SC	34	16	9	9	50	38	+12	57	Playoffs
6	Miami FC	34	15	9	10	47	32	+15	55	Playoffs
7	Detroit City FC	34	14	8	12	44	30	+14	54	Playoffs
8	FC Tulsa	34	12	16	6	48	58	−10	42	
9	Indy Eleven	34	12	17	5	41	55	−14	41	
10	Hartford Athletic	34	10	18	6	47	57	−10	36	
11	Loudoun United FC	34	8	22	4	36	74	−38	28	
12	Charleston Battery	34	6	21	7	41	77	−36	25	
13	Atlanta United 2	34	6	23	5	39	85	−46	23	
14	New York Red Bulls II	34	3	25	6	24	76	−52	15	

Source: USL Championship Standings
Rules for classification: 1) head-to-head points; 2) head-to-head goal differential; 3) points-per game within conference; 4) total wins; 5) total goal differential; 6) total goals scored; 7) points earned against top four Conference finishers; 8) disciplinary points; 9) coin toss or drawing of lots

==== Matches ====
March 12 1	Louisville City FC	1–0	Atlanta United 2	Louisville, Kentucky
7:30 PM EDT	Harris (yellow card) 57', (goal) 70'; Wynder (yellow card) 64'	Report	Brick (yellow card) 69'	Stadium: Lynn Family Stadium; Attendance: 8,318; Referee: Melvin Rias

March 16 2	Atlanta United 2	0–1	New York Red Bulls II	Kennesaw, Georgia
8:00 PM EDT	McFadden (red card) 19'	Report	Castillo (yellow card) 11'; Sserwadda (red card) 73'; Adebayo-Smith 66'	Stadium: Fifth Third Bank Stadium; Attendance: 435; Referee: Sergii Demianchuk

March 23 3	Atlanta United 2	0–3	Tampa Bay Rowdies	Kennesaw, Georgia
8:00 PM EDT	Brick (yellow card) 19'	Report	Dos Santos 20'; Dalgaard 31'; Antley (yellow card) 35'; LaCava 62'; Guillén (yellow card) 64'	Stadium: Fifth Third Bank Stadium; Attendance: 663; Referee: Chris Ruska

March 27 4	Atlanta United 2	4–1	Charleston Battery	Kennesaw, Georgia
7:30 PM EDT	Lambe (yellow card) 2'; Firmino (yellow card) 20'; Conway 56', 63', 78'; Matheus 90+4'	Report	Weber (yellow card) 4'; Apodaca 6'; Sheldon (yellow card) 33' (yellow-red card) 45+1'; Williams (yellow card) 49'; Kilwien (yellow card) 68'; Kwakwa (yellow card) 73'; Oduro (yellow card) 86'	Stadium: Fifth Third Bank Stadium; Attendance: 624; Referee: Kyle Johnston

April 2 5	Hartford Athletic	1–2	Atlanta United 2	Hartford, Connecticut
7:00 p.m. ET	Brewitt (yellow card) 45'; Cobb 70' (o.g.); Appollon (yellow card) 87'	Report	Lambe (yellow card) 23'; Firmino 45+1', 58'; McFadden (yellow card) 74'; Mertz (yellow card) 78'; Howard (yellow card) 88'	Stadium: Trinity Health Stadium; Attendance: 5,022; Referee: Christian Centeno

April 9 6	Atlanta United 2	0–4	Detroit City FC	Kennesaw, Georgia
7:30 PM EDT	Mertz (yellow card) 48'; Mejía (yellow card) 57'; Ambrose (yellow card) 76'; Matheus (red card) 79'; Prince (red card) 86'	Report	Carroll 23'; Hoppenot 33'; Botello Faz 42'; Bryant 78'	Stadium: Fifth Third Bank Stadium; Attendance: 574; Referee: Jordan Gray

April 16 7	Indy Eleven	2–1	Atlanta United 2	Indianapolis, Indiana
7:00 PM EDT	Law 12'; Cochran (yellow card) 14'; Brown (yellow card) 27'; Fjeldberg (yellow card) 29'; Briggs 90+2'	Report	Chukwuma (yellow card) 10'; Conway 68'; Howard (yellow card) 90+5'	Stadium: Michael A. Carroll Stadium; Attendance: 5,906; Referee: Calin Radosav

April 23 8	Pittsburgh Riverhounds SC	4–0	Atlanta United 2	Pittsburgh, Pennsylvania
7:00 PM EDT	Kelly 20', 56'; Griffin (yellow card) 25'; Argudo 29'; Cicerone 76'	Report	McFadden (yellow card) 37'	Stadium: Highmark Stadium; Attendance: 5,202; Referee: Kevin Fikar

May 4 9	Atlanta United 2	0–4	Louisville City	Kennesaw, Georgia
7:30 PM ET	Washington (yellow card) 81'; Morales (yellow card) 87'	Report	DelPiccolo 5'; McCabe (yellow card) 27', (goal) 52'; Totsch (yellow card) 36'; Gonzalez 60'; Matsoso 85'	Stadium: Fifth Third Bank Stadium; Attendance: 640; Referee: Kyle Johnston

May 21 10	Detroit City FC	3–1	Atlanta United 2	Hamtramck, Michigan
7:30 PM EDT	Botello Faz 13'; Hoppenot 32'; Rodriguez 49'; Diop (yellow card) 54'; Ouimette (yellow card) 67'; Bryant (yellow card) 90+4'	Report	Orji 44'; Morales (yellow card) 53' (yellow-red card) 64'; Mertz (yellow card) 54'; McFadden (yellow card) 57'	Stadium: Keyworth Stadium; Attendance: 5,483; Referee: Alex Billeter

May 27 11	Atlanta United 2	0–0	Orange County SC	Kennesaw, Georgia
7:30 PM ET	Firmino (yellow card) 2'; Lambe (yellow card) 26'; Brennan (yellow card) 81'	Report	Pedersen (yellow card) 80'; Shutler (yellow card) 84'	Stadium: Fifth Third Bank Stadium; Attendance: 749; Referee: Alyssa Nichols

June 1 12	Atlanta United 2	3–4	Rio Grande Valley FC Toros	Kennesaw, Georgia
7:30 PM EDT	Raimar 45+1' (pen.), (yellow card) 78'; Mertz 50', 65'; Morales (yellow card) 55'	Report	Ycaza 22'; Hernández 26'; Torres (yellow card) 64'; Coronado 77', 90+2'	Stadium: Fifth Third Bank Stadium; Attendance: 584; Referee: Izlen Peksenar

June 4 13	Memphis 901 FC	5–2	Atlanta United 2	Memphis, Tennessee
8:30 PM EDT	Goodrum (yellow card) 4', (goal) 26', 30'; Kissiedou 24'; Kelly (yellow card) 33'; Smith (yellow card) 45+1'; Molloy 70'; Turci 82'	Report	Sullins (yellow card) 3', (goal) 46'; Mertz 18'; Centeno (yellow card) 68'; Matheus (yellow card) 85'	Stadium: AutoZone Park; Attendance: 6,073; Referee: Thomas Snyder

June 11 14	Atlanta United 2	2–0	Loudoun United	Kennesaw, Georgia
7:30 PM EDT	Morales (yellow card) 20'; Raimar 32' (pen.), (yellow card) 60', (goal) 90+4'	Report	Smith (yellow card) 80'	Stadium: Fifth Third Bank Stadium; Attendance: 339; Referee: Adorae Monroy

June 18 15	Atlanta United 2	0–3	Hartford Athletic	Kennesaw, Georgia
7:30 p.m. EDT	Mejia (yellow card) 8'; Lambe (yellow card) 33'	Report	Hertzog (penalty missed) 32'; Lewis (yellow card) 35'; Prpa 42'; Obregón Jr. (yellow card) 52'; Gdula (yellow card) 65'; Johnson 75'; Brewitt 80'; McGlynn (yellow card) 90+3'	Stadium: Fifth Third Bank Stadium; Attendance: 532; Referee: Natalie Simon

June 25 16	Oakland Roots	3–1	Atlanta United 2	Oakland, California
7:00 PM PDT	Johnsen 49'; Karlsson 75' (pen.); Rodriguez 87'	Report	Howard (yellow card) 73'; Orji (yellow card) 66'; Centeno (yellow card) 54'; Trager 60'; Fortune (yellow card) 80'	Stadium: Laney College Football Stadium; Attendance: 3,622; Referee: Corbyn May

June 29 17	Charleston Battery	3–4	Atlanta United 2	Mount Pleasant, South Carolina
7:30 PM EDT	Williams 20'; Cichero 50', (yellow card) 57'; Harmon (yellow card) 74'; Pérez 90+7'	Report	Trager 1', 4'; Conway 35', 70'; Cobb (yellow card) 58'; Fortune (yellow card) 60'; Chukwuma (yellow card) 64'; Mertz (yellow card) 74'; Firmino (yellow card) 88'	Stadium: Patriots Point Soccer Complex; Attendance: 2,649; Referee: John Matto

July 2 18	Atlanta United 2	2–2	El Paso Locomotive FC	Kennesaw, Georgia
6:30 PM CDT	Trager 11', 17'; Conway (yellow card) 44'; Mertz (yellow card) 68'; Chukwuma (yellow card) 89'	Report	Solignac 4'; Gómez (yellow card) 34'; Fox (yellow card) 35'; Zacarías (yellow card) 40' (yellow-red card) 90+4'; Calvillo 90+1'	Stadium: Fifth Third Bank Stadium; Attendance: 534; Referee: José Carlos Rivero

July 6 19	Atlanta United 2	3–3	Birmingham Legion FC	Kennesaw, Georgia
7:30 PM EDT	Raimar (yellow card) 31'; Matheus (yellow card) 42'; Morales (yellow card) 48'; Brennan 65'; Trager 67'; Firmino 90+2'	Report	Martínez 9'; Marlon (yellow card) 45'; Lapa (penalty missed) 48', 49'; Herivaux 74'; Corcoran (yellow card) 88'	Stadium: Fifth Third Bank Stadium; Attendance: 551; Referee: DeShun Beard

July 9 20	FC Tulsa	2–1	Atlanta United 2	Tulsa, Oklahoma
8:30 PM EDT	Rodríguez (yellow card) 17' (yellow-red card) 51' da Costa 25'; Diz (yellow card) 72'; Brown 79'	Report	Brennan 37'; Chukwuma (yellow card) 45+2'; Cobb (yellow card) 59' (yellow-red card) 89'	Stadium: Oneok Field; Attendance: 4,053; Referee: Lorenzo Hernandez

July 16 21	San Antonio FC	5–0	Atlanta United 2	San Antonio, Texas
9:00 PM EDT	Adeniran 13', 51'; Patiño 16', 33' (pen.); Maloney (yellow card) 20'; PC (yellow card) 65'; Dhillon (penalty missed) 71', 88'	Report	Centeno (yellow card) 58'; Reyes (yellow card) 71'	Stadium: Toyota Field; Attendance: 5,716; Referee: Abdou Ndiaye

July 23 22	Tampa Bay Rowdies	3–1	Atlanta United 2	St. Petersburg, Florida
7:30 PM EDT	Dos Santos 25', 38', (yellow card) 45+2'; Wyke (yellow card) 47'; Fernandes 68' (pen.); Harris (yellow card) 85'	Report	Matheus 14'; Morales (yellow card) 15'; Raimar (yellow card) 30'	Stadium: Al Lang Stadium; Attendance: 4,890; Referee: Adam Kilpatrick

July 30 23	Atlanta United 2	1–1	Las Vegas Lights FC	Kennesaw, Georgia
7:30 PM EDT	Chukwuma 25', (red card) 90+1'; Washington (yellow card) 47'	Report	Crisostomo (yellow card) 14'; Jennings 80'	Stadium: Fifth Third Bank Stadium; Attendance: 530; Referee: Alejo Calume

August 6 24	Birmingham Legion FC	6–0	Atlanta United 2	Birmingham, Alabama
20:00 EDT	Martínez 2', (yellow card) 72', (goal) 74'; Kasim 37' (pen.); Marlon 39'; Agudelo 43'; Balarabe 87'	Report	Brennan (yellow card) 44'; Morales (yellow card) 53'; Chol (yellow card) 62'	Stadium: Protective Stadium; Referee: Jervis Atagana

August 9 25	New York Red Bulls II	2–1	Atlanta United 2	Montclair, New Jersey
7:00 PM EDT	Ryan (yellow card) 43'; Knapp (yellow card) 55' (yellow-red card) 65'; Sserwadda 82'; Mullings 90'	Report	Centeno (yellow card) 19'; Raimar 68'; Firmino (yellow card) 76'	Stadium: MSU Soccer Park at Pittser Field; Referee: DeShun Beard

August 13 26	Atlanta United 2	0–2	Miami FC	Kennesaw, Georgia
7:30 PM EDT	Cobb (red card) 31'; Morales (yellow card) 35'; Fortune (yellow card) 41'; Ambrose (yellow card) 75'	Report	Segbers 8', (yellow card) 48'; Chapman-Page (yellow card) 12'; Akinyode (yellow card) 77'; Valot 90+3'	Stadium: Fifth Third Bank Stadium; Attendance: 547; Referee: Gabriele Giusti

August 20 27	Loudoun United	3–1	Atlanta United 2	Leesburg, Virginia
7:15 PM EDT	Freeman 8' (pen.); Orji 68' (o.g.); Zamudio (yellow card) 90'; Garay 90+3'	Report	Conway 22'; Orji (yellow card) 52'; Raimar (yellow card) 75'	Stadium: Segra Field; Attendance: 1,932; Referee: Alex Billeter

August 27 28	Atlanta United 2	1–2	Pittsburgh Riverhounds SC	Kennesaw, Georgia
4:30 PM EDT	Fortune (yellow card) 9'; Washington (yellow card) 35'; Conway 66'; Raimar (yellow card) 90+3'	Report	Dikwa 44', 71'; Griffin (yellow card) 62'; M. Williams (yellow card) 88'; J. Williams (yellow card) 90+6'	Stadium: Fifth Third Bank Stadium; Attendance: 531; Referee: Katja Koroleva

September 3 29	Atlanta United 2	2–1	FC Tulsa	Kennesaw, Georgia
7:30pm EDT	Conway 64', 89'; Ambrose (yellow card) 83'	Report	Machuca (yellow card) 16'; Bird (yellow card) 52'; Suarez 69'	Stadium: Fifth Third Bank Stadium; Attendance: 504; Referee: Alejo Calume

September 7 30	Atlanta United 2	0–4	Memphis 901 FC	Kennesaw, Georgia
7:30pm EDT	Morales (yellow card) 34'	Report	Goodrum 36', 43', 51'; Allan (yellow card) 63'; Bwana 64'	Stadium: Fifth Third Bank Stadium; Attendance: 449; Referee: Ricardo Fierro

September 17 31	Miami FC	2–2	Atlanta United 2	Miami, Florida
7:00 PM EDT	Akinyode (yellow card) 44'; Chapman-Page 45+1'; Murphy 70'	Report	Matheus 57'; Firmino (yellow card) 67'; Pérez 81' (o.g.); Carleton (yellow card) 89'	Stadium: Riccardo Silva Stadium; Attendance: 1,317; Referee: Austin Saini

September 28 32	Atlanta United 2	0–1	Indy Eleven	Kennesaw, Georgia
7:30pm EDT	Tiente (yellow card) 28'; Centeno (yellow card) 56'; Carleton (yellow card) 88'	Report	Dambrot 23'; Revolorio (yellow card) 40'	Stadium: Fifth Third Bank Stadium; Attendance: 693; Referee: Alyssa Nichols

October 8 33	LA Galaxy II	1–3	Atlanta United 2	Carson, California
10:30 PM EDT	González (yellow card) 4'; Dunbar 8', (yellow card) 90+4'	Report	Fortune (yellow card) 25'; Trager 75', 87'; Villal 90+7'	Stadium: Dignity Health Sports Park; Referee: Adam Kilpatrick

October 15 34	Phoenix Rising FC	3–1	Atlanta United 2	Chandler, Arizona
10:30 PM EDT	King (yellow card) 37'; Williams (yellow card) 45+4'; Torres 53'; Moar 58'; Quinn 72', (yellow card) 84'; Antwi (yellow card) 85'; Lambert (yellow card) 86'	Report	Orji (yellow card) 21'; Matheus (yellow card) 35'; Conway (yellow card) 65' (goal) 80'	Stadium: Wild Horse Pass Stadium; Referee: Nabil Bensalah

== Statistics ==
=== Top Scorers ===
As of August 1, 2022

Place	Position	Name	USLC	Playoffs	Total
1	FW	(United States) Jackson Conway	6	0	6
1	FW	(United States) Tristan Trager	6	0	6
2	DF	(Brazil) Raimar	3	0	3
2	MF	(United States) Robbie Mertz	3	0	3
2	MF	(Brazil) Nicolas Firmino	3	0	3
3	FW	(Venezuela) Darwin Matheus	2	0	2
3	DF	(Nigeria) Nelson Orji	2	0	2
3	FW	(United States) Luke Brennan	2	0	2
4	FW	(United States) Andrew Sullins	1	0	1
Total			28	0	28
