= Nicolás Giménez =

Nicolás Giménez may refer to:

- Nicolás Giménez (footballer, born 1996), Emirati midfielder for Al Wasl
- Nicolás Giménez (footballer, born 1997), Argentine defender for Rosario Central
- Nicolás Giménez (footballer, born 2000), Venezuelan forward for Atlético Venezuela
