= Four Corners Cup =

American soccer competition

- Organizer(s): Various supporters' groups from participating teams
- Founded: 2019
- Region: Four Corners region, southwestern United States
- Teams: 4; Colorado Springs Switchbacks FC; New Mexico United; Phoenix Rising FC; Real Monarchs SLC
- Related competitions: USL Championship
- Most championships: Real Monarchs SLC (1 title)

The Four Corners Cup was a regional soccer competition among the USL Championship clubs located in states that intersect at the Four Corners: Colorado Springs Switchbacks FC, New Mexico United, Phoenix Rising FC and Real Monarchs SLC. The four clubs played each other home and away in a round robin format, with the champion determined by total points accumulated. The competition was canceled during the 2021 as Phoenix Rising were assigned to a separate division, preventing round-robin play. In 2022, the Real Monarchs moved the MLS Next Pro league, ending the competition.

== 2019 ==
Pos	Team	Pld	W	D	L	GF	GA	GD	Pts	SLC	NMU	PHX	COS
1	Real Monarchs SLC (C)	6	4	0	2	9	11	−2	12	—	1–0	2–4	1–0
2	New Mexico United	6	3	2	1	16	9	+7	11	5–1	—	2–2	3–1
3	Phoenix Rising FC	6	2	3	1	15	11	+4	9	1–2	3–3	—	2–2
4	Colorado Springs Switchbacks FC	6	0	1	5	5	14	−9	1	1–2	1–3	0–3	—

(C) Champions

== 2020 ==
2020 results summary
Team	Pld	W	D	L	GF	GA	GD	Pts
New Mexico United	9	6	1	2	14	10	+4	19
Real Monarchs SLC	8	2	2	4	11	13	-2	8
Colorado Springs Switchbacks FC	8	1	3	4	10	15	-5	6
Phoenix Rising FC	1	1	0	0	5	2	+3	3

On June 24, the league announced the structure of its Return To Play format, separating the league into eight separate groups for regional competitions. Because Phoenix was combined with the southern California clubs into Group B, while the other three cup competitors were combined with El Paso into Group C, a full cup competition was impossible for the year. The announcement of the full league Return To Play schedule created the following partial fixture list among the cup participants.

Kickoff times are in MDT (UTC-06) unless otherwise noted.

July 11 1	Colorado Springs Switchbacks FC	1–2	New Mexico United	Colorado Springs, Colorado
5:00 PM	Daniels 45+2'	Report	Muhammad 25'; Wehan (yellow card) 56', (goal) 87'	Stadium: Weidner Field; Attendance: 1,000; Referee: Laura Rodriguez

July 18 2	Real Monarchs SLC	3–3	Colorado Springs Switchbacks FC	Sandy, Utah
2:00 PM	Coffee 30'; Brody 40'; Farnsworth (yellow card) 49'; Peay 61'	Report	Cervós 45+3'; Lewis (yellow card) 51' (yellow-red card) 73'; Burt 89'; Rwatubyaye 90+5', (yellow card) 90+5'	Stadium: Rio Tinto Stadium; Referee: Michael Radchuk

August 1 3	Colorado Springs Switchbacks FC	1–2	Real Monarchs SLC	Colorado Springs, Colorado
6:00 PM	Burt (yellow card) 2'; Lebese 57' (pen.); Diz Pe (yellow card) 90+2'	Report	Blake 35' (pen.); Davis (yellow card) 67'; Peay 90+3'; Sierakowski (yellow card) 90+5'	Stadium: Weidner Field; Attendance: 1,000; Referee: Malik Badawi

August 8 4	Phoenix Rising FC	5–2	New Mexico United	Phoenix, Arizona
7:30 PM MST	Flemmings 17', 73', 86'; Dadashov 22'; Cochran 52'; Lambert (yellow card) 57'; Calistri (yellow card) 80'	Report	Parkes 5'; Guzmán (yellow card) 45+1'; Tinari 59'; Moreno (yellow card) 89'	Stadium: Casino Arizona Field; Attendance: 0 Referee: Lukasz Szpala (United States)

August 15 5	Colorado Springs Switchbacks FC	0–1	New Mexico United	Colorado Springs, Colorado
3:00 PM MDT	Rubio (yellow card) 63'; Ferreira (yellow card) 90+4'		Tinari (yellow card) 30'; Wehan 45'; Najem (yellow card) 66'; Ryden (yellow card) 90+1'	Stadium: Weidner Field; Attendance: 1,000; Referee: Malik Badawi

August 19 6	Real Monarchs SLC	0–2	New Mexico United	Herriman, Utah
8:00 PM MDT	Powder (yellow card) 45+3'	Report	Ryden 38'; Muhammad (yellow card) 42'; Williams (yellow card) 42'; Moreno 68'	Stadium: Zions Bank Stadium; Attendance: 465; Referee: Matthew Thompson

August 22 7	Real Monarchs SLC	1–2	New Mexico United	Herriman, Utah
8:00 PM	Sierakowski 53'	Report	Moreno 5', (yellow card) 45'; Tetteh (yellow card) 29'; Wehan 48'; Guzmán (yellow card) 55'; Ryden (yellow card) 87'	Stadium: Zions Bank Stadium; Attendance: 570; Referee: Lukasz Szpala

August 29 8	Colorado Springs Switchbacks FC	1–1	New Mexico United	Colorado Springs, Colorado
6:00 PM	Lewis (yellow card) 54'; Daniels 59'	Report	Tinari (yellow card) 37'; Moreno 54' (pen.); Williams (yellow card) 65' (yellow-red card) 75'; Mizell (yellow card) 90+3'	Stadium: Weidner Field; Attendance: 1,000; Referee: Farhad Dadkho

September 9 9	Real Monarchs SLC	4–1	Colorado Springs Switchbacks FC	Herriman, Utah
8:00 PM	Vázquez 18'; Brown 26'; Davis 69'; Powder 76'	Report	Daniels 88', (yellow card) 34'	Stadium: Zions Bank Stadium; Referee: Brad Jensen

September 12 10	Real Monarchs SLC	0–2	New Mexico United	Herriman, Utah
12:00 PM MDT	Giménez (yellow card) 23'; Vázquez (yellow card) 54'; Moberg (yellow card) 66'	Report	Tinari (yellow card) 30'; Moreno 40', 65'; Guzmán (yellow card) 90+2'	Stadium: Zions Bank Stadium; Attendance: 368; Referee: Elvis Osmanovic

September 19 11	New Mexico United	1–2	Colorado Springs Switchbacks FC	Albuquerque, New Mexico
3:30 PM	Sandoval 28'; Moreno (yellow card) 64'	Report	Volesky 45+1' (pen.), (yellow card) 45+2'; Ferreira 48'; Daniels (yellow card) 88'	Stadium: Rio Grande Credit Union Field at Isotopes Park; Referee: Elton Garcia

September 26 12	Colorado Springs Switchbacks FC	1–1	Real Monarchs SLC	Colorado Springs, Colorado
6:00 PM	Volesky (yellow card) 11', (goal) 42' (pen.); Cervós (yellow card) 45'	Report	Davis 21'; Brown (yellow card) 47'	Stadium: Weidner Field; Attendance: 700; Referee: Adam Kilpatrick

September 29 13	Real Monarchs SLC	0–1	New Mexico United	Albuquerque, New Mexico
7:30 PM	Flores (yellow card) 17'; Moberg (yellow card) 23'; Ávila (yellow card) 29'; Jasso (yellow card) 62'	Report	Bruce (yellow card) 27'; Muhammad (yellow card) 38'; Ryden (yellow card) 46'; Ahlinvi 57'	Stadium: Rio Grande Credit Union Field at Isotopes Park; Attendance: 396; Referee: Chris Ruska
