= Chapa Herrera =

American soccer player (born 1996)

Personal information
- Full name: Louis Herrera
- Date of birth: May 3, 1996 (age 30)
- Place of birth: El Paso, Texas, United States
- Position: Midfielder

Team information
- Current team: Greenville Triumph
- Number: 8

Senior career*
Years	Team	Apps	(Gls)
2016–2018	El Paso Coyotes (indoor)	25	(7)
2019–2023	El Paso Locomotive	95	(3)
2024–	Greenville Triumph	71	(3)
- * Club domestic league appearances and goals as of October 31, 2026

Louis "Chapa" Herrera (born May 3, 1996) is an American professional soccer player who plays as a midfielder for Greenville Triumph in USL League One.

== Career ==
Herrera was initially spotted in 2018 at a local soccer tournament by El Paso Locomotive coach Mark Lowry, who invited him to a private tryout. After impressing the club in said tryout, Herrera signed for the club ahead of their inaugural season. Herrera made his debut for the club on March 24, 2019, coming on as an 80th-minute substitute for Sebastián Contreras in a 2–2 draw with Rio Grande Valley. He scored his first goal for the club in July of that season in a 1–1 draw with OKC Energy FC. After making 28 league appearances for the club during his first season, Herrera was retained for the 2020 campaign. In February of that season, Herrera went on trial with MLS club Los Angeles FC. His contract was extended for a third season at the end of 2020.

On February 20, 2024, Herrera signed with USL League One side Greenville Triumph.
