= Nicolás Giménez (footballer, born 2000) =

Venezuelan footballer

Personal information
- Full name: Nicolás Jesús Giménez Alvarado
- Date of birth: 17 February 2000 (age 26)
- Place of birth: Venezuela
- Position: Forward

Team information
- Current team: Atlético Venezuela

Youth career
- Atlético Venezuela

Senior career*
Years	Team	Apps	(Gls)
2016–	Atlético Venezuela	0	(0)
- * Club domestic league appearances and goals as of 23:14, 21 May 2018 (UTC)

Nicolás Jesús Giménez Alvarado (born 17 February 2000) is a Venezuelan professional footballer who plays as a forward for Venezuelan Primera División side Atlético Venezuela.

== Career ==
Atlético Venezuela were Giménez's opening senior club. He made his first-team debut for the Venezuelan Primera División side in the Copa Venezuela on 6 July 2016, he scored his first goal in the process during a 4–1 victory over Arroceros de Calabozo of the Venezuelan Segunda División.

== Career statistics ==
As of 21 May 2018.

Club statistics
Club	Season	League			Cup (Note: Includes the Copa Venezuela)		League Cup		Continental (Note: Includes the Copa Sudamericana)		Other		Total	
Club	Season	Division	Apps	Goals	Apps	Goals	Apps	Goals	Apps	Goals	Apps	Goals	Apps	Goals
Atlético Venezuela	2016	Primera División	0	0	1	1	—		—		0	0	1	1
Atlético Venezuela	2017	Primera División	0	0	0	0	—		0	0	0	0	0	0
Atlético Venezuela	2018	Primera División	0	0	0	0	—		—		0	0	0	0
Career total			0	0	1	1	—		0	0	0	0	1	1
