= Sebastián Contreras (Argentine footballer) =

Argentine footballer

Personal information
- Date of birth: 5 April 1990 (age 36)
- Place of birth: Argentina
- Height: 1.77 m (5 ft 10 in)
- Position: Attacking midfielder

Youth career
- Central Norte

Senior career*
Years	Team	Apps	(Gls)
2012	Atlético Venezuela	15	(1)
2013–2014	UAI Urquiza	10	(0)
2015	Metropolitanos	13	(2)
2015–2016	Trujillanos	29	(1)
2016	Zamora	19	(1)
2017	UAI Urquiza	17	(0)
2018	Defensores Unidos	9	(0)
2019	El Paso Locomotive	34	(3)
2020	Union Omaha	15	(1)
2020–2022	Omaha Kings (indoor)	10	(5)
2022	Valley United	1	(0)
- * Club domestic league appearances and goals as of 21 May 2022

Sebastián Contreras (born 5 April 1990) is an Argentine professional footballer who plays as a midfielder. He is currently free agent.
