= Nelson Orji =

Nigerian footballer

Personal information
- Full name: Orji Nelson Chukwuma
- Date of birth: 5 April 2002 (age 24)
- Place of birth: Warri, Nigeria
- Height: 1.88 m (6 ft 2 in)
- Position: Defender

Team information
- Current team: Rasisalai United
- Number: 26

Youth career
- Super Star Football Academy
- –2021: FC Porto

Senior career*
Years	Team	Apps	(Gls)
2020–2021	FC Porto	0	(0)
2021	→ Zalaegerszegi (loan)	0	(0)
2022–2023	Atlanta United 2	36	(3)
2024–2025	Brežice 1919	0	(0)
2025–2026	Muangthong United	13	(0)
2026–	Rasisalai United	5	(0)
- * Club domestic league appearances and goals as of 00:09, 15 January 2026 (UTC)

Orji Nelson Chukwuma (born 5 April 2002) is a Nigerian footballer who plays as a defender for Thai League 1 club Rasisalai United.

== Club career ==
Orji joined the FC Porto under-19 team after playing for the Super Star Football Academy in Nigeria. In early 2021, Orji was sent on loan to Hungarian Nemzeti Bajnokság I side Zalaegerszegi. His only appearance for the side was in the Magyar Kupa.

On 2 March 2022, Orji signed with USL Championship club Atlanta United 2. He debuted for Atlanta on 9 April 2022, appearing as a 64th–minute substitute during a 4–0 loss to Detroit City FC.
