= Moses Makinde =

English footballer

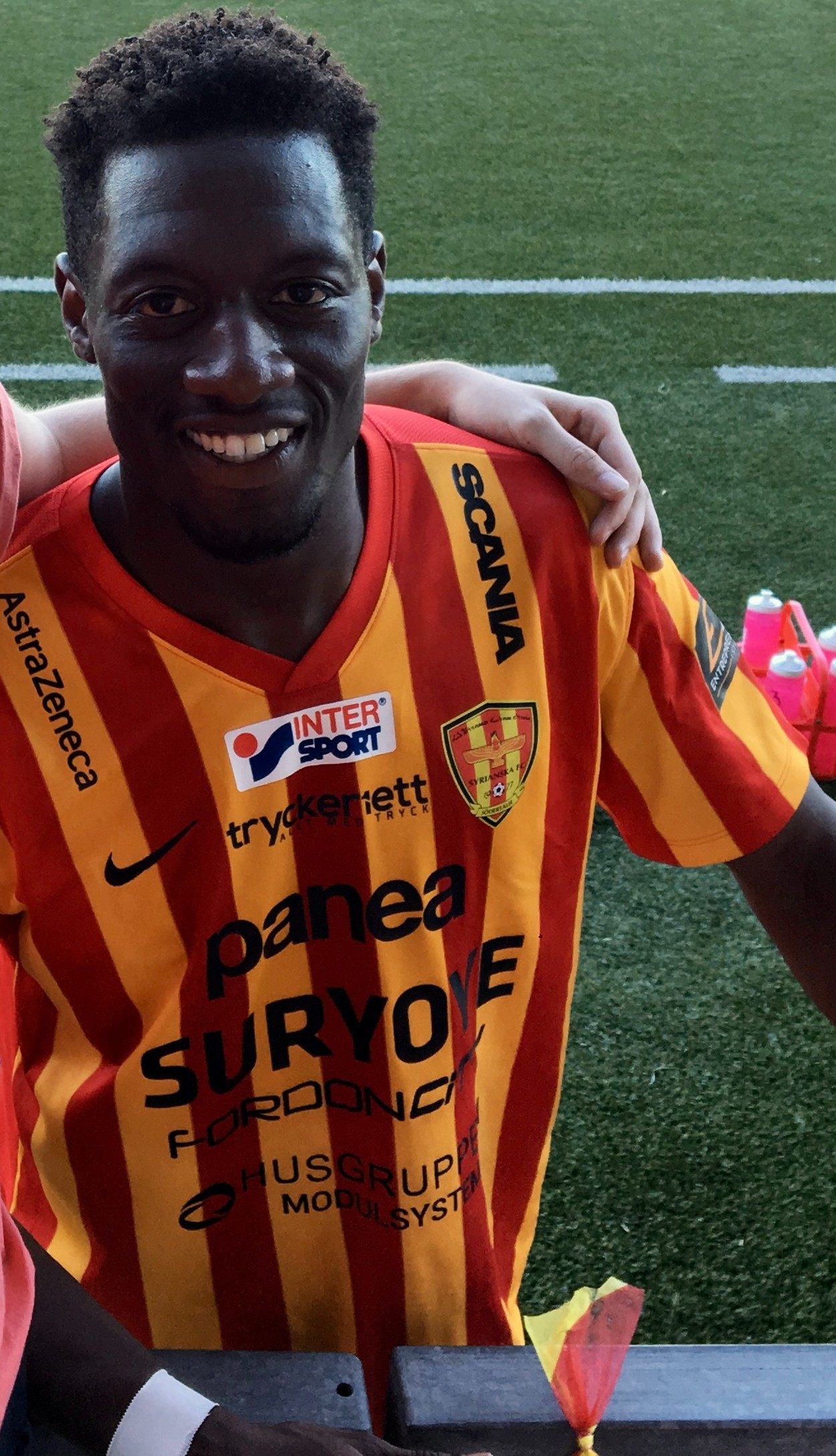

Personal information
- Full name: Moses Gbenga Makinde
- Date of birth: 15 November 1992 (age 33)
- Place of birth: London, England
- Position: Defender

Youth career
- Birchmere
- 2001–2010: Baltimore Bays

College career
Years	Team	Apps	(Gls)
2010–2013	NC State Wolfpack	69	(2)

Senior career*
Years	Team	Apps	(Gls)
2011–2012	Carolina RailHawks U23		
2012	Baltimore Bohemians	1	(0)
2013	Carolina RailHawks U23		
2014	Whitehawk	0	(0)
2014–2015	VfB Auerbach	11	(0)
2016	Metalul Reșița	11	(0)
2018	Syrianska	21	(2)
2019	Tulsa Roughnecks	11	(0)
2019–2020	El Paso Locomotive	13	(0)
2022	Maryland Bobcats		
- * Club domestic league appearances and goals as of 1 December 2022

Moses Gbenga Makinde (born 15 November 1992) is an English professional footballer who plays as a defender.

== Career ==
Makinde enrolled at North Carolina State University in 2010, spending four years studying sport management and playing college soccer.

In July 2019, after 12 appearances in all competitions for Tulsa Roughnecks, Makinde joined fellow USL Championship side El Paso Locomotive by way of trade with Calvin Rezende moving in the opposite direction.

Makinde returned to the Baltimore area in January 2022, signing a contract with Maryland Bobcats FC of the National Independent Soccer Association. He had previously played with club before they turned professional.

== Personal life ==
Makinde was born London before moving to Baltimore at the age of nine where he spent the rest of his childhood. His cousin is fellow footballer Korede Aiyegbusi.
