= Chiró N'Toko =

Zairian footballer

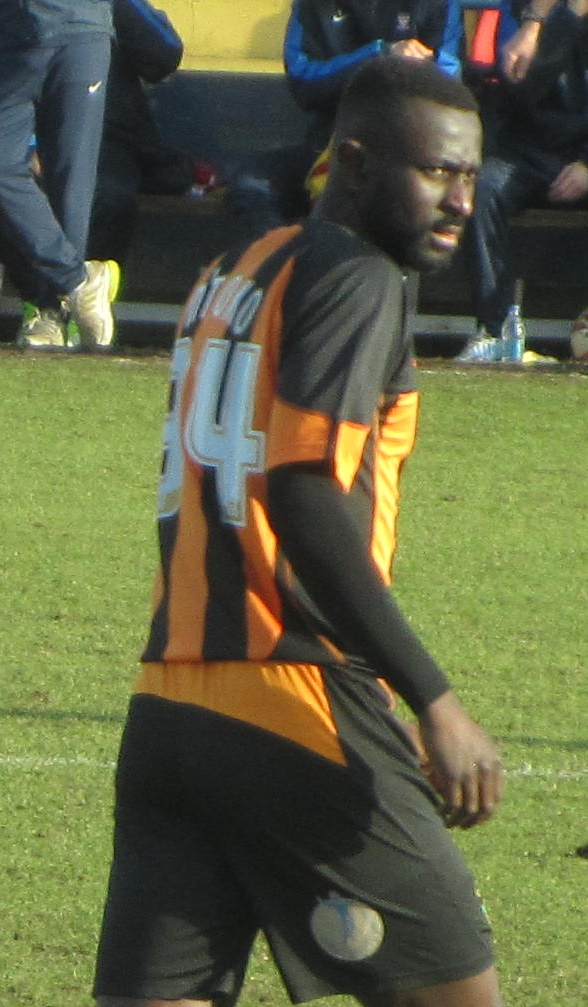
- N'Toko playing for Barnet in 2013

Personal information
- Full name: Chiró Vuza N'Toko Mena
- Date of birth: 30 January 1988 (age 38)
- Place of birth: Kinshasa, Zaire
- Position: Centre back

Senior career*
Years	Team	Apps	(Gls)
2005–2007	Seraing	41	(0)
2007–2010	AGOVV	95	(4)
2011–2012	ADO Den Haag	15	(0)
2013	Barnet	2	(0)
2013–2016	Eindhoven	85	(11)
2016–2017	Cambuur	13	(0)
2017–2018	NAC Breda	10	(0)
2018	Senica	0	(0)
2018–2020	El Paso Locomotive	32	(1)
- * Club domestic league appearances and goals as of 17 February 2021

Chiró Vuza N'Toko Mena (born 30 January 1988), known as Chiró N'Toko, is a footballer who plays as a centre back. He most recently played for El Paso Locomotive in the USL Championship.

== Club career ==
=== AGOVV ===
N'Toko came to AGOVV in the summer of 2007 as a replacement for Dennis van der Ree who had moved to SC Cambuur. Although his primary position is centre back he succeeded as right back for AGOVV in his first season. In his second season at AGOVV he became a regular in the first squad, and was considered one of the best defenders of the Eerste Divisie. In his third season N'Toko was placed in the centre back position due to the breakthrough of fellow AGOVV-player Ramon Leeuwin. At the end of the 2009–10 season N'Toko was released from his contract in search for a new challenge.

=== ADO Den Haag ===
In the winter of 2011, N'Toko was signed by former AGOVV-manager John van den Brom until the summer of 2013. He played his first game for the club as a substitute in the 0–1 away win against PSV as a substitute from Dmitri Bulykin. On 13 March 2012, N'Toko suffered a serious knee injury and was out for the remainder of the season. N'Toko was released at the end of the 2011–12 season.

=== Barnet ===
N'Toko joined Barnet on 15 February 2013, and made his debut when he started in a 2–1 win at York City a day later. Following Barnet's relegation at the end of the season N'Toko was released by the club.

=== Later career ===
In July 2013, N'Toko signed a two-year deal with FC Eindhoven. After three seasons as a key player for the club, he joined Cambuur on 22 June 2016. He played 13 matches before joining NAC Breda on 9 January 2017.

In September 2018, N'Toko moved to Slovak Super Liga club FK Senica. He then joined USL Championship club El Paso Locomotive in November 2018. He grew into a team captain at the club. He suffered a season-ending injury in the summer of 2020 and was subsequently not included in the roster.
