= Distel Zola =

Professional footballer (born 1989)

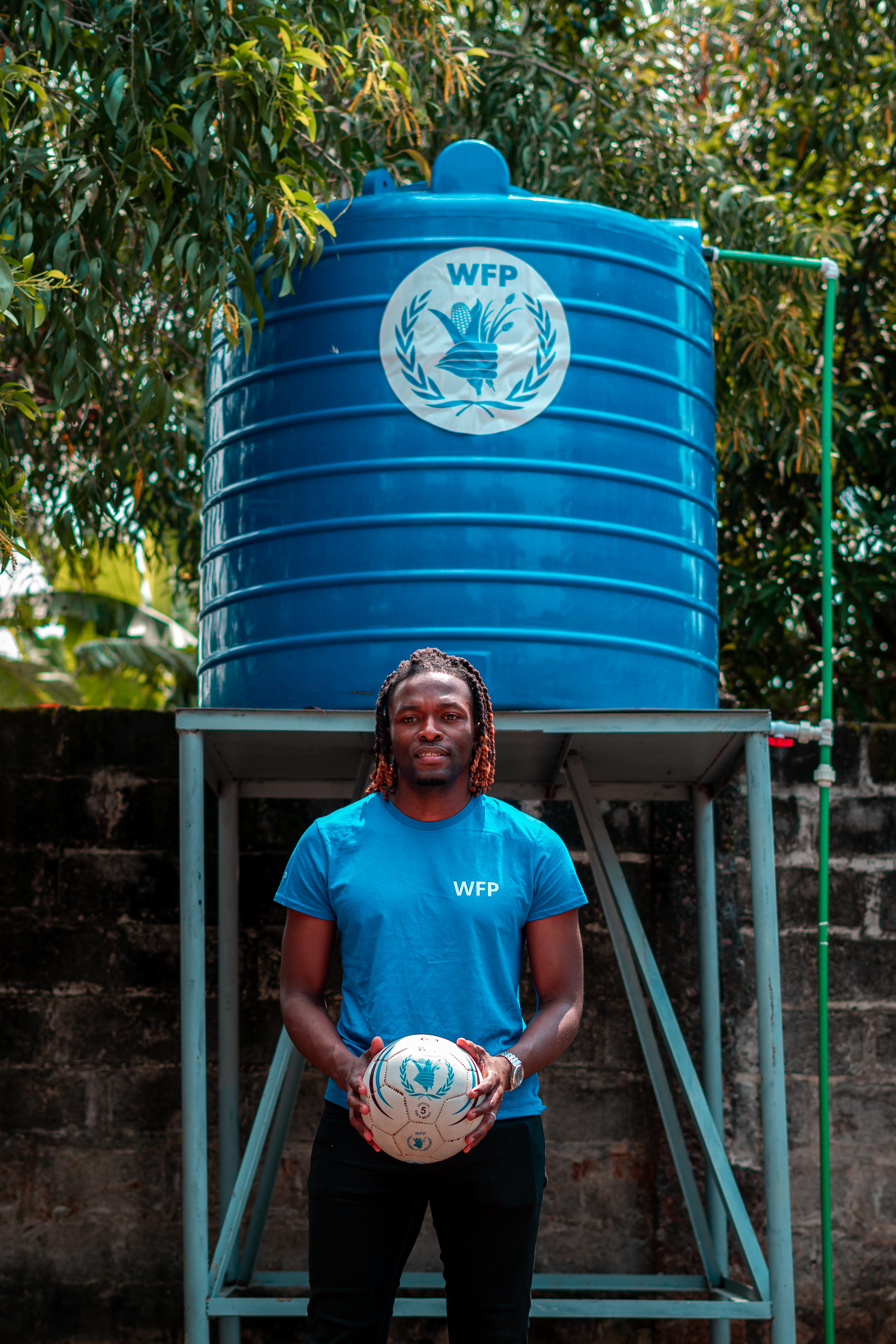

Personal information
- Full name: Distel Zola
- Date of birth: 5 February 1989 (age 37)
- Place of birth: 12th arrondissement of Paris, France
- Height: 1.86 m (6 ft 1 in)
- Position: Defensive midfielder

Youth career
- 1994–2002: Champigny-sur-Marne
- 2002–2004: US Alfortville
- 2004–2009: Monaco

Senior career*
Years	Team	Apps	(Gls)
2009–2011	Monaco	0	(0)
2010–2011	→ Laval (loan)	27	(1)
2011–2012	Nancy	1	(0)
2012	→ Le Havre (loan)	15	(1)
2012–2014	Le Havre	65	(1)
2014–2015	Châteauroux	20	(0)
2015–2017	Samsunspor	17	(0)
2018–2019	Tours FC	26	(0)
2020–	El Paso Locomotive	10	(0)
2021	→ Charlotte Independence (loan)	8	(0)

International career^{‡}
2004–2005	France U16	12	(0)
2005–2006	France U17	10	(0)
2006–2007	France U18	6	(0)
2007–2008	France U19	4	(0)
2010–	Congo DR	21	(0)
- * Club domestic league appearances and goals as of 18 May 2016 ‡ National team caps and goals as of 4 November 2021

Distel Zola (born 5 February 1989) is a professional footballer who plays as a defensive midfielder.

He is a former French youth international having earned caps at all levels of youth. In 2010, Zola switched international allegiance to the Democratic Republic of the Congo due to his ancestry. He made his debut in May 2010 in a friendly match against Saudi Arabia.

== Early life ==
Zola was born in 1989 in the 12th arrondissement of Paris, of Zairean parents born in the Belgian Congo. He acquired French nationality on 24 June 2002, through the collective effect of his mother's naturalization.

== Career ==
=== Early career ===
Zola began his football career at the age of five at a local football academy in his hometown of Champigny-sur-Marne, a local southeastern Parisian suburb. After spending eight years at the club, he moved to US Alfortville. After a two-year stint in Alfortville, Zola drew interest from professional clubs Paris Saint-Germain, Auxerre, and Monaco. Zola ultimately signed with Monaco describing the club as the "most convincing" of the three.

=== Monaco ===
Zola spent one season in Monaco's youth academy, and, in the 2005–06 season, appeared in two matches on the club's Championnat de France amateur team in the fourth division. The following season, he was promoted to the amateur team full-time making 15 appearances. Zola spent two more seasons playing on the amateur team and, prior to the start of the 2008–09 season, turned professional and was, subsequently, promoted to the senior team and assigned the number 29 shirt by manager Ricardo Gomes.

Zola appeared on the bench for the club's first five league matches and continued to play on the club's amateur team in the fifth division. On 25 September 2008, while playing with the amateur team, he suffered a torn anterior cruciate ligament in his right knee, which required five months of rehabilitation. He returned to play in February 2009, but did not make any senior team appearances. Zola later suffered an injury setback to his knee and endured significant rehabilitation for much of the 2009–10 season. On 10 August 2010, a healthy Zola was loaned out to Ligue 2 club Stade Lavallois for the entire 2010–11 season in order for the player to get some first-team playing time. On 13 August, Zola made his professional debut in a league match against Metz. He appeared as a substitute in a 1–0 victory.

=== Nancy ===
In July 2011, Nancy confirmed that it had signed Zola to a three-year contract. Zola ended his career at Monaco without making a senior team appearance for the club.

=== Le Havre and Châteauroux ===
After a single game for Nancy in six months, Zola was loaned to Le Havre AC, a stay that was made permanent in the summer of 2012. In August 2014, Zola joined Châteauroux on a three-year contract.

=== Samsunspor ===
On 15 July 2015, Zola joined Süper Lig side Samsunspor.

=== El Paso Locomotive ===
On 12 December 2019, after spending the 2018–2019 season with French third-tier side Tours FC, Zola joined USL Championship side El Paso Locomotive ahead of the 2020 season.

==== Charlotte Independence (loan) ====
On 27 April 2021, Zola joined Charlotte Independence on loan for the 2021 season.

== International career ==
After playing for the French youth teams, Zola chose to play for the DR Congo in 2010.
