= Bode Hidalgo =

American soccer player (born 2002)

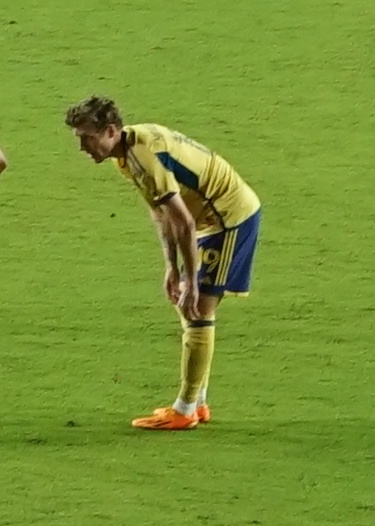
- Hidalgo with Real Salt Lake in 2024

Personal information
- Full name: Bode Shane Davis
- Date of birth: February 22, 2002 (age 24)
- Place of birth: Kaysville, Utah, United States
- Height: 6 ft 0 in (1.83 m)
- Position: Right-back

Team information
- Current team: CF Montréal
- Number: 19

Youth career
- 2016–2020: Real Salt Lake

Senior career*
Years	Team	Apps	(Gls)
2020–2025	Real Monarchs	53	(5)
2021–2025	Real Salt Lake	69	(1)
2025–	CF Montréal	4	(0)
- * Club domestic league appearances and goals as of May 16, 2025

Bode Hidalgo (born Bode Shane Davis; February 22, 2002) is an American professional soccer player who plays as a right-back for Major League Soccer club CF Montréal.

== Career ==
Hidalgo appeared for USL Championship side Real Monarchs as an academy player on July 11, 2020, starting in a 1–0 loss to San Diego Loyal. Hidalgo signed a professional deal with Real Monarchs on July 16, 2020.

On September 9, 2020, Hidalgo scored his first professional goal for Real Monarchs in a match against Colorado Springs Switchbacks FC. On September 22, 2020, it was announced that Hidalgo would sign a homegrown player deal with Real Salt Lake for the 2021 season and beyond.

Hidalgo made his MLS debut on March 19, 2022, against Nashville SC. He scored his first goal for the club on October 9, 2022, in a 3–1 win over the Portland Timbers.

On August 21, 2025, Hidalgo was traded to CF Montréal in exchange for up to $350,000 in General Allocation Money.

== Personal life ==
Bode was born in Kaysville, Utah to Shane and Amy Davis. He changed his name to Bode Hidalgo in 2022.

== Career statistics ==
As of match played 19 October 2025

Appearances and goals by club, season and competition
Club	Season	League			National cup (Note: Includes U.S. Open Cup and Canadian Championship)		Playoffs		Continental		Other		Total	
Club	Season	Division	Apps	Goals	Apps	Goals	Apps	Goals	Apps	Goals	Apps	Goals	Apps	Goals
Real Monarchs	2020	USL Championship	15	2	—		—		—		—		15	2
Real Monarchs	2021	USL Championship	21	2	—		—		—		—		21	2
Real Monarchs	2022	MLS Next Pro	13	1	—		—		—		—		13	1
Real Monarchs	2023	MLS Next Pro	1	0	—		—		—		—		1	0
Real Monarchs	2025	MLS Next Pro	2	0	0	0	—		—		—		2	0
Real Monarchs	Total		52	5	0	0	—		—		—		52	5
Real Salt Lake	2021	MLS	0	0	—		0	0	—		—		0	0
Real Salt Lake	2022	MLS	6	1	1	0	1	0	—		1 (Note: Appearance(s) in Leagues Cup)	0	9	1
Real Salt Lake	2023	MLS	23	0	3	0	1	0	—		3	0	30	0
Real Salt Lake	2024	MLS	25	0	1	0	0	0	—		2	0	28	0
Real Salt Lake	2025	MLS	18	0	—		—		2 (Note: Appearance(s) in CONCACAF Champions Cup)	0	3	0	23	0
Real Salt Lake	Total		72	1	5	0	2	0	2	0	9	0	90	1
CF Montréal	2025	MLS	6	0	—		—		—		—		6	0
Career total			130	6	5	0	2	0	2	0	9	0	148	6
