= Robby Dambrot =

American soccer player (born 1994)

Personal information
- Full name: Robert Dambrot
- Date of birth: October 19, 1994 (age 32)
- Place of birth: Akron, Ohio, United States
- Height: 1.88 m (6 ft 2 in)
- Position: Defender

College career
| Years | Team | Apps | (Gls) |
| 2013–2016 | Akron Zips | 47 | (1) |
| 2017–2018 | Pittsburgh Panthers | 21 | (1) |

Senior career*
| Years | Team | Apps | (Gls) |
| 2014–2015 | AFC Cleveland | | |
| 2019 | Virginia Beach City | 7 | (0) |
| 2019–2021 | Loudoun United | 33 | (1) |
| 2022 | Pittsburgh Riverhounds | 5 | (1) |
| 2022–2023 | Indy Eleven | 38 | (3) |
| 2024–2025 | Loudoun United | 46 | (2) |
- * Club domestic league appearances and goals as of October 25, 2025

Robert Dambrot (born October 19, 1994) is an American soccer player who plays as a defender.

== Career ==
=== College and amateur ===
Dambrot began playing college soccer at the University of Akron in 2013, where he red-shirted his first season before transferring to the University of Pittsburgh in 2017.

During college, Dambrot appeared in the National Premier Soccer League with spells at AFC Cleveland and also following college with Virginia Beach City in 2019.

=== Professional ===
On August 9, 2019, Dambrot signed for USL Championship side Loudoun United. He made his professional debut on August 14, starting in a 2–1 loss to Charleston Battery. On January 7, 2020, Loudoun announced that Dambrot would return for the 2020 season.

On January 19, 2022, Dambrot signed with USL Championship club Pittsburgh Riverhounds.

Dambrot joined Indy Eleven on August 2, 2022.

Dambrot returned to Loudoun United ahead of their 2024 season, signing a two-year deal. Dambrot was released by Loudoun following their 2025 season.

== Personal ==
Robby is the son of college basketball coach Keith Dambrot.
