= Nicolás Giménez (footballer, born 1997) =

Argentine footballer

Personal information
- Full name: Nicolás Jesús Giménez
- Date of birth: 17 April 1997 (age 29)
- Place of birth: Granadero Baigorria, Argentina
- Height: 1.82 m (6 ft 0 in)
- Position: Centre-back

Youth career
- Club Remedios
- 2011–2016: Rosario Central

Senior career*
Years	Team	Apps	(Gls)
2016–2019	Rosario Central	2	(0)
2019	San Martín	0	(0)
2020	Real Monarchs	13	(0)
- * Club domestic league appearances and goals as of 01:41, 18 December 2020 (UTC)

Nicolás Giménez (born 17 April 1997) is an Argentine professional footballer who plays as a centre-back.

== Career ==
Giménez signed for Rosario Central's academy from Club Remedios on 27 September 2011. He was first named in a senior matchday squad in May 2016, when he remained on the bench as the club drew at home to Quilmes in the Argentine Primera División. His professional debut arrived in the league two years later, with the defender being substituted on for the final eleven minutes of a 1–1 tie with Estudiantes. A first start came in the following campaign against Vélez Sarsfield, which preceded a third and final appearance for Rosario in the Copa Argentina versus Sol de Mayo on 26 February 2019.

In July 2019, Giménez headed to Primera B Nacional with San Martín. He wouldn't appear competitively for them, though was on the substitute's bench once for a fixture with Sarmiento in August. On 5 February 2020, Giménez joined USL Championship side Real Monarchs. His debut, which was delayed due to the COVID-19 pandemic, arrived on 11 July in a home defeat to the San Diego Loyal; after he had replaced Dayonn Harris off the bench. A further twelve appearances followed, before his departure at the end of the 2020 season.

== Career statistics ==
As of 18 December 2020.

Club statistics
Club	Season	League			Cup		League Cup		Continental		Other		Total	
Club	Season	Division	Apps	Goals	Apps	Goals	Apps	Goals	Apps	Goals	Apps	Goals	Apps	Goals
Rosario Central	2016	Primera División	0	0	0	0	—		0	0	0	0	0	0
Rosario Central	2016–17	Primera División	0	0	0	0	—		—		0	0	0	0
Rosario Central	2017–18	Primera División	1	0	0	0	—		0	0	0	0	1	0
Rosario Central	2018–19	Primera División	1	0	1	0	0	0	0	0	0	0	2	0
Rosario Central	Total		2	0	1	0	0	0	0	0	0	0	3	0
San Martín	2019–20	Primera B Nacional	0	0	0	0	—		—		0	0	0	0
Real Monarchs	2020	USL Championship	13	0	0	0	—		—		0	0	13	0
Career total			15	0	1	0	0	0	0	0	0	0	16	0
