= Southwest University Park =

Baseball park in El Paso, Texas, US

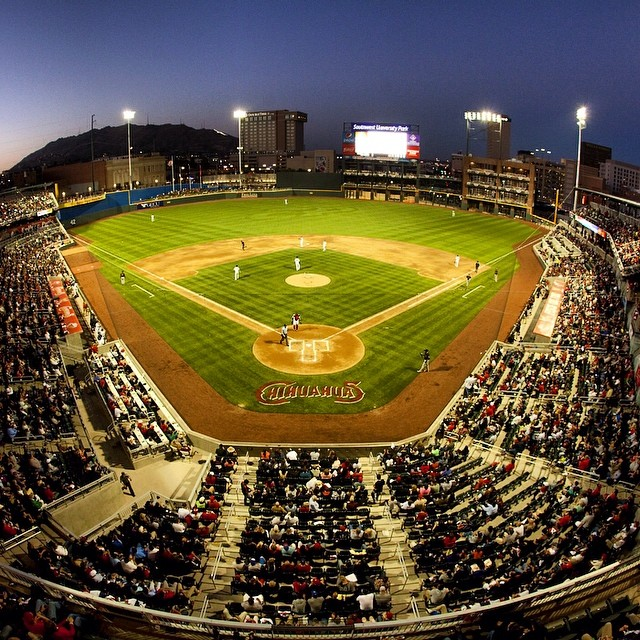
- The field in August 2021

- Location within Texas Location within the United States
- Interactive map of Southwest University Park
- Address: 1 Ballpark Plaza; El Paso, Texas; United States
- Coordinates: 31°45′32.5″N 106°29′33.6″W
- Elevation: 3,750 feet (1,140 m)
- Owner: City of El Paso
- Operator: MountainStar Sports Group
- Capacity: 7,500 (fixed seating); 9,500–10,000 (plus additional seating)
- Field size: Left field: 322 ft (98 m); Left-center field: 392 ft (119 m); Center field: 406 ft (124 m); Right-center field: 384 ft (117 m); Right field: 322 ft (98 m)
- Public transit: El Paso Streetcar at Cleveland Square

Construction
- Groundbreaking: May 30, 2013
- Opened: April 28, 2014
- Cost: $78 million
- Architects: Populous; MNK Architects, Inc.
- Project managers: International Facilities Group, LLC
- Structural engineer: Walter P Moore
- Services engineers: Henderson Engineers, Inc.
- General contractor: C. F. Jordan/Hunt

Tenants
- El Paso Chihuahuas (PCL) 2014–present El Paso Locomotive FC (USLC) 2019–present

Southwest University Park is a ballpark in El Paso, Texas. It is the home of the El Paso Chihuahuas, a Minor League Baseball team in the Pacific Coast League, and El Paso Locomotive FC, a second-tier USL Championship team since its inaugural season in 2019. Opened in 2014, the facility has an official capacity of 9,500, with 7,500 fixed seats, with the rest being berm and party deck standing room sections.

The name "Southwest University" is applied to the stadium to recognize its corporate sponsor, Southwest University at El Paso, a for-profit virtual college that does not sponsor intercollegiate athletics. Southwest University Park was named as the best new ballpark in 2014 by Ballpark Digest. The elevation of the playing field is approximately 3,750 feet (1,140 m) above sea level.

== History ==
The complex is situated upon the site of El Paso's former City Hall, which was demolished by implosion on April 14, 2013, to make way for the stadium. Former El Paso mayor Ray Salazar had filed a 2013 lawsuit to stop the demolition of the old City Hall, alleging the misuse of public funds by city officials, but the lawsuit was dismissed in court.

Ground for the ballpark was broken on May 30, 2013, with 300 people attending the event, including members of MountainStar Sports Group, the ownership group of the El Paso Pacific Coast League team, Pat O'Conner, president and CEO of Minor League Baseball, and City Representatives Ann Morgan Lilly, Susie Byrd, Cortney Niland, and Steve Ortega.

On March 5, 2014, it was announced that the team had signed a 20-year naming rights deal for the ballpark with Southwest University, an El Paso based business and technical school known until 2012 as Southwest Career College. (Southwest University is not the same institution as the University of the Southwest located in Hobbs, New Mexico.)

In January 2017, Southwest University Park was selected as the host site for the 32nd Triple-A All-Star Game, to be played in July 2019.

In August 2018, Southwest University Park was awarded the title of "Best View in the Minors" by Minor League Baseball fans. The El Paso park topped Peoples Natural Gas Field, home of the Altoona Curve, and Modern Woodmen Park, home of the Quad Cities River Bandits, in the voting.

== Features ==
The design theme is based on the Union Depot and incorporates architectural details found in the region's historic buildings, such as the Kress Building in Downtown El Paso. It also pays tribute to the city's baseball history through various forms of art.

Some of the notable features of the ballpark include:

- A 360 concourse
- 46,000 square feet of floor space on the concourse level
- 24 luxury suites
- 500 club seats in the Dugout Club, Concourse Club and WestStar Bank Club
- Team office space and retail store
- Party decks/zones
- Multiple restaurants and food stands
- Kids Zone
- Outfield seating
- Diversified food options
