= Sam Brown (soccer) =

American soccer player

Personal information
- Full name: Samuel Brown
- Date of birth: February 10, 1996 (age 30)
- Place of birth: Ann Arbor, Michigan, U.S.
- Height: 6 ft 1 in (1.85 m)
- Position: Central midfielder

College career
Years	Team	Apps	(Gls)
2014–2018	Harvard Crimson	62	(3)

Senior career*
Years	Team	Apps	(Gls)
2016	Portland Timbers U23s	7	(0)
2019–2021	Real Monarchs	47	(1)
2022	Indy Eleven	26	(0)
- * Club domestic league appearances and goals as of October 16, 2022

Sam Brown (born February 10, 1996) is an American soccer player who plays as a central midfielder.

== Career ==
=== College and amateur ===
Brown attended and played four years of college soccer at Harvard University between 2014 and 2018, including a redshirted year in 2017. Brown tallied a total of 3 goals and 12 assists in 62 appearances for the Harvard Crimson. Throughout his four years at Harvard, Brown was the Ivy League Rookie of the Year, a two-time Second Team All-Ivy honoree, an NSCAA All-East Region third team honoree, and an Ivy League Honorable Mention. Brown majored in Mechanical Engineering at Harvard and was a resident of Quincy House.

While in college, Brown played with PDL side Portland Timbers U23s in 2016.

=== Professional ===
On January 11, 2019, Brown was selected 17th overall in the 2019 MLS SuperDraft by Real Salt Lake. Brown signed for the club's USL Championship affiliate Real Monarchs on February 27, 2019. Brown became the first player from Harvard to be selected in the first round. Brown made his Real Monarchs debut on April 13, 2019, coming on as a second-half substitute for Pablo Enrique Ruíz in a 5–1 loss to New Mexico United.

On December 21, 2021, it was announced that Brown would join USL Championship side Indy Eleven ahead of their 2022 season. He left Indy Eleven following their 2022 season.

== Honors ==
Real Monarchs

- USL Cup: 2019
