= Mark Lowry (soccer) =

English footballer and manager

Personal information
- Full name: Mark Anthony Lowry
- Date of birth: 11 August 1985 (age 41)
- Place of birth: Solihull, England

Team information
- Current team: Greenville Triumph

Youth career
- Coventry City

Senior career*
Years	Team	Apps	(Gls)
2002–2003	Stafford Rangers		
2003	Halesowen Town		

Managerial career
- 2016–2018: Jacksonville Armada
- 2018–2021: El Paso Locomotive
- 2021–2023: Indy Eleven
- 2024–2026: Real Monarchs
- 2026–: Greenville Triumph
- * Club domestic league appearances and goals

Mark Lowry (born 11 August 1985) is an English football manager and former player who is the Head Coach and Technical Director for Greenville Triumph in USL League One.

== Career ==
During his playing career, he represented English clubs Stafford Rangers, Halesowen Town and Hereford United. Lowry earned a UEFA B coaching licence at the age of 21, before going to on to earn an "A" licence.

He moved to U.S., coaching throughout Central Florida before starting a successful soccer, the Premier Academy of Excellence, PAX, Orlando, Florida. He later joined the staff at Orlando City SC, coaching at the academy and for the Orlando City U-23 team in the Premier Development League.

Lowry joined the coaching staff Jacksonville Armada FC in September 2015.

In August 2016, Lowry was appointed as interim coach of following Tony Meola's departure. In October 2016, he was appointed as coach on a permanent basis.

On 25 July 2018, he was announced as head coach and technical director of the expansion club El Paso Locomotive FC.

On 15 November 2021, Lowry departed from Locomotive FC. Lowry had led El Paso to the postseason each of their first three seasons, including two Western Conference Final appearances. The following day, 16 November 2021, Lowry took the managerial job at Indy Eleven.

Lowry parted ways with Indy Eleven on 28 November 2023.

Lowry was named head coach for Real Monarchs of MLS Next Pro on January 22, 2024. Lowry replaces Jamison Olave, who was added to the Real Salt Lake first team staff.

Lowry departed Real Monarchs on 16 November 2026.

On 19 November 2026, Lowry was named Head Coach and Technical Director for the Greenville Triumph in USL League One.
