= Bryam Rebellón =

Colombian footballer (born 1992)

Personal information
- Full name: Bryam Alberto Rebellón Sánchez
- Date of birth: January 22, 1992 (age 34)
- Place of birth: Puerto Gaitán, Colombia
- Height: 1.79 m (5 ft 10 in)
- Positions: Defender; midfielder

Youth career
- 2009–2010: Soacha
- 2010–2011: Girardot

Senior career*
Years	Team	Apps	(Gls)
2011–2012	Santa Fe	1	(0)
2013–2014	Sarmiento	0	(0)
2013–2014	→ Villa Dálmine (loan)	6	(0)
2014–2015	Llaneros	17	(2)
2016	LA Galaxy II	24	(2)
2017	Jacksonville Armada	21	(0)
2018	Swope Park Rangers	27	(0)
2019–2021	El Paso Locomotive	62	(3)
2022–2023	Indy Eleven	36	(2)
- * Club domestic league appearances and goals as of 23:19, 20 October 2023 (UTC)

Bryam Alberto Rebellón Sánchez (born 22 January 1992) is a Colombian footballer who most recently played for Indy Eleven in the USL Championship.

== Career ==
Rebellón spent time in both his native Colombia, and also in Argentina, before signing with United Soccer League side LA Galaxy II on 23 February 2016. On January 25, 2017, it was announced that Rebellón had signed with the Jacksonville Armada.

On 11 January 2019, Rebellón signed with USL Championship expansion team El Paso Locomotive FC. He left El Paso following the 2021 season.

In December 2021, it was announced Rebellón would make the move to Indy Eleven ahead of the 2022 season.

Rebellón was released by Indy Eleven on November 30, 2023, following the conclusion of the 2023 USL Championship season. He made 36 league appearances in his time at the Indianapolis-based club, scoring two league goals.
