= La Nube =

Museum in El Paso, Texas

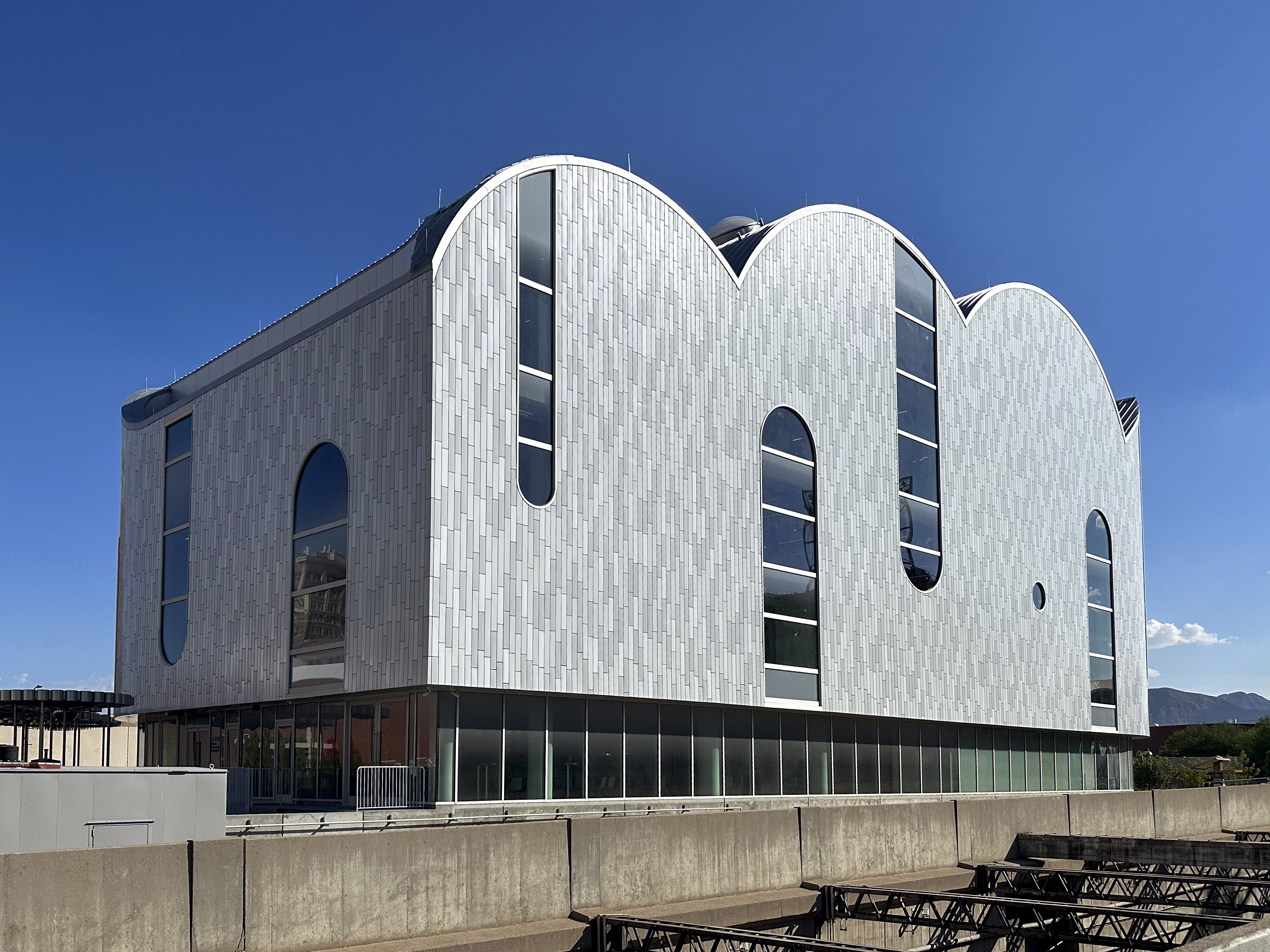
- Established: August 10, 2024; 2 years ago
- Location: 201 West Main Drive; El Paso, Texas, U.S.
- Coordinates: 31°45′33″N 106°29′27″W
- Type: Children's museum; science center
- Website: la-nube.org

La Nube (Spanish: [la ˈnu.β̞e], Spanish for 'The Cloud') is a children's museum and science center in Downtown El Paso, Texas, United States. It was funded in part by El Paso bonds in 2012, and after several years of delays, it opened on August 10, 2024. La Nube holds 77,000 square feet (7,200 m^{2}) of floor space and cost $72 million. The museum is divided into nine zones, each focusing on a scientific topic, such as the Anything's Possible Climber, a 50-foot-tall (15 m) climbing structure focused on shapes.

== History ==
On November 6, 2012, voters in El Paso, Texas, approved $473 million in government bonds for the city to use for quality-of-life initiatives in the community, including parks, libraries, and museums, with 76% of the voters supporting the measure. $19 million of this was set to be used for a children's museum. In January 2016, the city government purchased a Greyhound Lines maintenance facility in Downtown El Paso at 201 West Main Street for $1.27 million as the future site of the museum. Greyhound removed their underground fuel tanks and any asbestos in the building at their own expense. In exchange, the city granted Greyhound a ten-year lease of about 16,000 square feet (1,500 m^{2}) of one of its Sun Metro facilities for $114,409 per year. The city also attempted to purchase three surrounding properties, but property owners chose not to sell. In September 2016, the city approved a relationship with the EPC Museum Foundation under the El Paso Community Foundation so the EPC group would manage the development of the museum.

Architecture firms Snøhetta, Koning Eizenberg Architecture, and TEN Arquitectos displayed design proposals for the museum in December 2017, and the community was invited to vote on the designs. That month, the EPC group announced that the budgeted $19 million from the 2012 bonds would be insufficient. They pledged an additional $10 million for the project, saying they would double their pledge if the city would donate another $20 million. This brought the estimated cost of the museum's development to $59 million in an effort to make the finished project "world-class". About half of that amount was slated for the building itself, with the remaining funds to be used to install its exhibits. On July 23, 2018, the city council approved the additional $20 million in funding with a 6–1 vote. The one representative who opposed this, Michiel Noe, did so because he believed other bond projects were as important but not receiving sufficient funding compared to the children's museum. This additional funding was accomplished by an increase in property taxes averaging about $3 per year and set to begin in 2020. This decision faced some criticism from the community, because the taxpayer-funded government was now responsible for twice as much as voters previously approved in 2012.

=== Design ===
In October 2018, Snøhetta was announced as the designer of the museum after winning the public vote. They proposed a building vaulted off the ground to leave space for an interactive garden below. Their design incorporated bright and open spaces into a building with over 80,000 square feet (7,400 m^{2}) of floor space. At the time, construction was estimated to begin in early 2019 and conclude in late 2021 or early 2022.

Snøhetta revealed a dramatically remade cloud-shaped design for the museum on October 1, 2020. The new design was 70,000 square feet (6,500 m^{2}) and included four floors with multi-story glass windows, along with additional outdoor exhibits. The Architect's Newspaper described the new design as "a much heavier, solid building topped with an undulating, cloud-like roof profile".

=== Construction ===
On October 1, 2020, a groundbreaking ceremony was held for the project, with children participating. While construction had officially begun on the museum, the EPC group announced that the COVID-19 pandemic could negatively impact the completion date. Along with the new design came a new budget totaling approximately $70 million, with the EPC group funding an additional $10 million for the project. The next month, the museum announced plans for eight of its nine exhibition areas, designed by Gyroscope, Inc. in Oakland, California.

The museum invited the community to suggest a name in January 2021. Stephanie Otero, the vice president of the El Paso Community Foundation, said "We know what the outside of the building is going to look like, we know what the inside of the building is going to look like and what kinds of experiences people are going to have inside that museum. We don't know what to call it." The prize for the winning name was lifetime admission to the museum. After receiving over 600 suggestions, the museum announced on March 23, 2022, that it would be called La Nube, which is Spanish for 'The Cloud'. The name was announced at a ceremony at the El Paso Independent School District's Aoy Elementary School, with attending students receiving free T-shirts promoting La Nube. At this point, the museum was estimated to open in early 2023. An endowment fund was created for La Nube in November 2022, with its first donation being an undisclosed amount.

La Nube caught fire on March 13, 2023, and the irregularly-shaped roof slowed the response of the El Paso Fire Department (EPFD). This prompted concerns from the community regarding the safety of the roof. Two days later, an investigation concluded that the fire was unintentional and started due to common construction methods while construction workers were on the roof. No exhibits were in the building yet, and the water damage from the EPFD's response was found to be more significant than the damage done by the fire itself. Repairs after the fire were completed by July, and the estimated opening was adjusted to 2024.

On April 16, 2024, La Nube announced a final opening date of August 10. Prior to the launch, several "soft launches" were scheduled for staff recruitment and training. Leading up to the opening, the El Paso Chihuahuas wore Star Wars–themed jerseys for their game against the Sugar Land Space Cowboys on May 4, auctioning the jerseys after the game and donating the funds to La Nube.

After several years of delays, La Nube opened on August 10 with a ribbon-cutting ceremony and public celebration. The celebration included science demonstrations, food trucks, and live performances. The final 77,000-square-foot (7,200 m^{2}) complex cost $72 million, with most of the funds raised through private donations.

== Architecture ==
La Nube is a four-story building with 77,000 square feet (7,200 m^{2}) of floor space that can hold about 1,200 people. The first floor is wrapped in glass to utilize natural light, in addition to multi-story arched windows and smaller circular windows. The roof of the building has four sections, with three curved and one pitched. The museum has three entrances, including one for group visits which can accommodate four buses at one time. One of the main features inside the building is an atrium with an interactive climbing structure spanning all four floors.

There are also outdoor spaces for exhibitions, decorated with local plants and natural boulders. They offer trees and misters for cooling and shade.

== Exhibits ==
La Nube is organized with nine different zones of exhibits, each focusing on a specific science-related topic. Visitors receive RFID wristbands that track their activity and photos from each of the exhibition zones.

Exhibition zones at La Nube
Title	Focus	Description	Sponsorship	Notes
Anything's Possible Climber	Geometric shapes	A 50-foot-tall (15 m) climbing structure with games for visitors to find and learn about shapes	$5 million from the Woody and Gayle Hunt Family Foundation	The climber complies with the Americans with Disabilities Act and features a wheelchair obstacle course on the top floor.
Challenge It	Maker space	Exhibits where visitors create physical projects, including wood cars and 3D-printed objects	$1 million from Richard Castro	Challenge It was created by Fab Lab, a company based in El Paso.
Desert Bloom	Young children	An area intended for children ages 0–3 and their parents with sensory-friendly activities	—N/a	Desert Bloom is the only age-restricted zone in the museum and also prohibits shoes.
Flow	Water	Exhibits and activities surrounding water, its uses in society, and its treatment	By Marathon Petroleum	Flow includes a mock bus washing station in recognition of the original Greyhound facility La Nube is built on.
Fly High	Aerospace	An interactive paper plane–making exhibit with where visitors can launch creations over a model of the Franklin Mountains	$1 million from William and Cita Sanders and the Sanders Foundation	
Follow Your Instincts	Animals and related careers	A zone for children ages 4–7 centered on animals, where visitors pretend to be animals, learn about habitats and environments, or role-play as veterinarians	By the Arriola Foundation	
Making Waves	Sound and waves	A series of music- and sound-related activities, with some incorporating programming concepts	By the Cardwell Foundation	
Our Sky	Meteorology	Weather-related exhibits where visitors can create model structures to withstand natural disasters, use a weather station, and record a green screen weather broadcast	$300,000 from Cliff and Martha Eisenberg	La Nube held a digital photo contest for El Paso children to submit photos of clouds to be featured in Our Sky.
Puzzle It	Cafe with puzzles	A cafe with multilingual puzzle kits available to check out	By W. Silver Recycling	

La Nube emphasizes inclusivity, with wheelchair accessibility throughout all exhibits and sensory-friendly accommodations. The museum offers about 200 kits available to check out for children with autism, including noise-cancelling headphones, sunglasses, a weighted vest, and a chewable necklace.

The museum also features work from local artists throughout the building, including a sculpture by El Paso nonprofit Creative Kids and murals by Christin Apodaca, Gabriel Marquez, and Mitsumasa Overstreet.

== Location ==
La Nube is located in the arts district of Downtown El Paso in El Paso, Texas. Its address is 201 West Main Drive, at the intersection of West Main Drive and North Santa Fe Street, across from Southwest University Park. It is near Ciudad Juárez across the Mexico–United States border. Because of its proximity to Mexico, La Nube's exhibits are presented with both English and Spanish text to accommodate the El Paso–Juárez community.

Community leaders believe La Nube will positively impact the economy of El Paso, bringing increased tourism and additional businesses to the area.

== Admission and membership ==
Daily passes for children cost $17 each, and tickets for adults cost $20 each. La Nube gives discounted rates to active-duty military members, their spouses, and adults over 65 years old. Adults entering without accompanying children are subject to a background check. Basic membership are available for $150 per year for one adult and one child. La Nube also offers "abuelos [grandparents] passes" for $375 per year, which include two adults over 55 years old and four children.

La Nube aims to join Museums for All, an organization which would allow them to provide discounted admission rates to families receiving food assistance.

== See also ==
- List of museums in West Texas
