= El Paso Police Department =

Law enforcement agency in El Paso, Texas

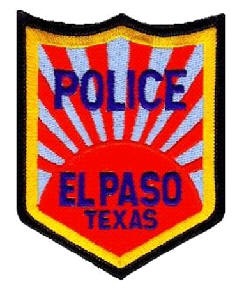
- EPPD Shoulder Patch

- EPPD Badge (Since 2004) (Used on side doors of new fleet of marked police cars)
- Abbreviation: EPPD

Agency overview
- Employees: 1,341 (2020)
- Annual budget: $158 million (2020)

Jurisdictional structure
- Operations jurisdiction: El Paso, Texas, USA
- Population: 682,686 (2018)
- General nature: Local civilian police

Operational structure
- Headquarters: El Paso, Texas
- Agency executive: Peter Pacillas, Chief of Police

Website
- El Paso Police

El Paso Police Department (EPPD) is the principal law enforcement agency serving El Paso, Texas, United States. As of Fiscal Year 2014, the agency had an annual budget of more than $118 million and employed around 1,300 personnel, including approximately 1,100 officers. Greg Allen was appointed as the EPPD's chief of police in March 2008 and served until his death in January 2023.

== History ==
=== Early history ===
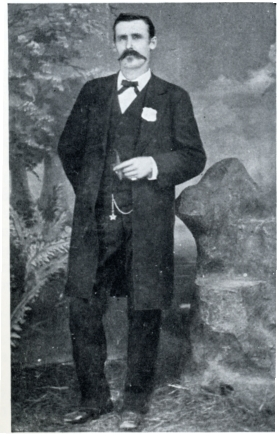
El Paso City Marshal Dallas Stoudenmire

The early history of the department is difficult to study. Many older newspaper accounts are inaccurate and documents from before about 1950 were lost in a fire. Newspaper accounts were often heavily exaggerated for local entertainment value or to bolster a "wild west" image for the city to readers in the eastern United States.

The formal establishment date for the department is 1884, but historical references to the department exist before that official date. During this period, the department employed a series of City Marshals who were known to be as rough and wild as the criminals in the frontier town, with shootouts and small scale wars being much more common than today for example in 1881 the "Four Dead in Five Seconds Gunfight". Some marshals were involved in confrontations out of town including the El Paso Salt War and the Lincoln County War. It was also not unheard of to have local, state and federal law enforcement at odds, including armed confrontations.

In 1889, the police department had its first appointed chief, T.C. Lyons. Lyons had previously served in the Fire Department and was not the typical "rough" character previously known in El Paso law enforcement. His tenure may mark the beginning of the more modern and civilized approach to law enforcement in the city.

=== 20th century ===
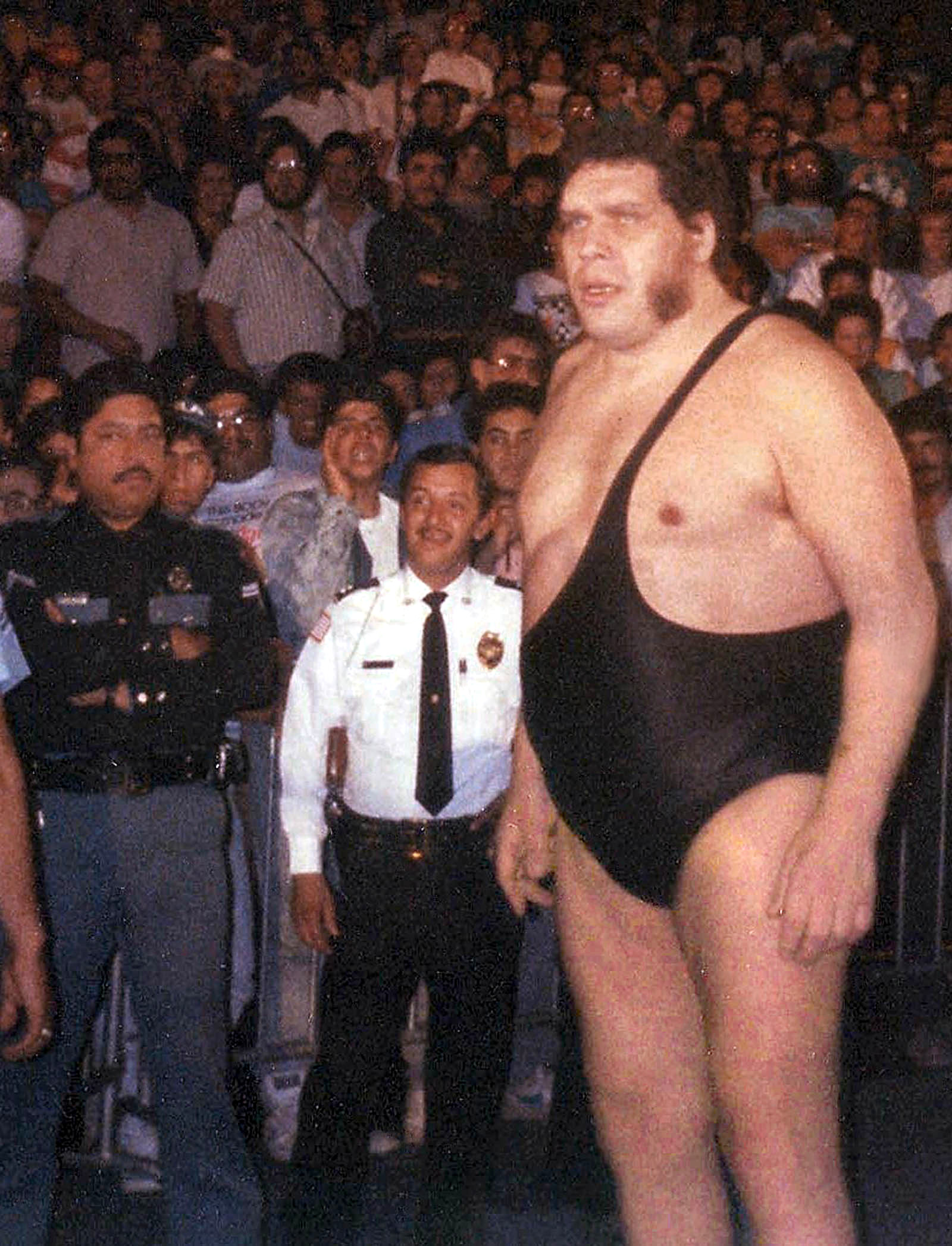
An El Paso Police patrol officer (dark uniform) and an El Paso fireman (light uniform) help provide security and protection at a 1989 wrestling event at the El Paso Civic Center.

Newspaper accounts show the police starting to use motor vehicles for law enforcement in 1909. Fingerprinting began in 1915. By the 1920s, pictures are available showing some of these advancements. Radar was introduced for speed enforcement in 1955, and the department formed its first SWAT unit in 1972. For a couple years, until 1976, the department had a mounted patrol, the only one in Texas at the time.

In 1946, the department hired its first African American officer (the official website states that four African American veterans were appointed in 1945) However, between that time and the 1970s-1980s, black officers were not allowed to do many of the things other officers could do, including arrests, driving vehicles or writing reports. The current chief, Greg Allen, is the department's first African American chief. The department started actively recruiting women in the 1940s, but none actually served as officers until 1974. However, during this time women actively served as "meter maids" or worked in the jail. Today, several women have achieved high ranks in the police department and the department has hosted the Women in Law Enforcement conference multiple times.

In 1972, the department opened a second station to serve the east side and parts of the lower valley. Growth since then has increased the number of stations to five (not including the central command). In the 1990s and early 2000s, the department has implemented many other advancements, including computers, cameras and non-lethal weapons like the Taser.

=== Recent history ===
Community policing has been an important goal of the police department in recent years. A 2011 study showed that police officers were spending 75% of their time responding to calls and 25% of their time on administrative work with little time left over for community patrols. Since the study, the department implemented several reforms to free up officer time, including privatized prisoner transport from stations to the jail, a call center for non-urgent reports and changes in the ways officers are called to testify. The goal is for "60-20-20" or 60% of time on reactive work (responding to calls), 20% of time on administrative tasks and 20% of time for community patrols and community involvement.

In 2012, the City Council honored Lt. Charles Harvey for serving in the department for 45 years. Harvey is the longest-serving member of the department and currently presides over the Criminal Investigation Division and Tactical Unit at the Central Regional Command. He told an El Paso Times reporter that he does not plan to retire any time soon.

Despite being near the border with Mexico and across the river from Ciudad Juarez (one of the most violent cities in the western hemisphere), El Paso is a very safe city with low crime. This may be caused by the high immigrant population in the city and the generally immigrant-welcoming environment. El Paso has been in the top three large cities (500,000+ population) with the lowest crime rates since 1997, and took the #1 spot for 2010–2013.

=== Proposed consolidation with county sheriff's office ===
For years, city officials and officials in the El Paso County government have been discussing a possible consolidation of EPPD with the El Paso County Sheriff's Office to reduce costs and improve law enforcement capability in the area. Proponents of this change include current sheriff Richard Wiles, city manager Joyce Wilson and others. Possible methods of consolidation include a Las Vegas style merger with the sheriff in charge of all aspects of policing or a split consolidation with the sheriff in charge of some things and a police chief in charge of others. All El Paso County sheriffs since 1985 have been former EPPD officers, including current Sheriff Wiles, who was formerly EPPD's chief.

Obstacles to consolidation include questions of who would control the metropolitan agency, training levels and the complexity of combining the departments.

As of late 2013, the process of consolidation has not gone forward beyond talks.

== In popular culture/media ==
Around 2008, forward e-mails titled "El Paso Police Pinata" or "One cop, three bad guys" were in circulation. The e-mails included graphic and bloody pictures of three men who were apparently shot by a police officer who was standing over them with his firearm. The e-mail claimed that the men came from Ciudad Juarez and attempted to rob an off-duty El Paso Police officer, who killed them all in retaliation. One image is captioned "Do you realize how much the US taxpayer saved by not having to prosecute these worthless thugs?". Internet forum users and bloggers determined that the incident in question likely occurred in Brazil years earlier and certainly did not occur in El Paso.

In 2012, F/X Networks filmed portions of their new show, The Bridge, in El Paso. For one scene, Sheriff Richard Wiles was dressed as an El Paso patrol officer guarding a crime scene. Sheriff Wiles (a former EPPD chief) helped the show's creators with their research so they could more accurately portray law enforcement in Juarez and El Paso.

== Specialized units ==
The El Paso Police Department operates a number of specialized units, including:

- Regional Operations (Patrol)
- Criminal Investigations
- Intelligence
- Special Traffic Investigations
- DWI Task Force
- Canine Unit
- COMSAR
- Training Academy
- Bomb Squad
- SWAT
- Dignitary Protection
- Internal Affairs
- Special Investigations Group

== Patrol divisions ==
- Central Regional Command
- Pebble Hills Regional Command
- Upper East Regional Command
- Mission Valley Regional Command
- Northeast Regional Command
- Westside Regional Command

== Ranks ==
Rank	Insignia
Chief	
Assistant Chief	
Commander	
Lieutenant	
Sergeant	
Patrol Officer (20+ years)	
Patrol Officer (15–19 years)	
Patrol Officer (10–14 years)	
Patrol Officer (5–9 years)	
Patrol Officer (<5 years)	none

== Chief of Police history ==
The Chiefs of Police are chronicled up until John E. Scagno in the 1991 Annual Report. The 1991 annual report prepends S. W. Boring and T. B. White as the first and second Chief of Police compared to the 1973 El Paso Police Annual Report.

No.	Last	First	Start date	Finish date	Notes
1	Boring	Samuel Watson	June 9, 1883		technically City Marshal
2	White	T. B.	August 21, 1885		
3	Lyons	T. C.	August 16, 1889		
4	William	Caples	June 5, 1891		
5	Payne	J. B.	November 17, 1893		
6	Milton	J. D.	August 10, 1894		
7	Fink	E. M.	January 17, 1896		
8	Hildebrand	H. R.	July 16, 1896		name spelled as "Hildebrant" on EPSO's history web page and "Hillebrand" or "Hilderbrand" in some sources; also served as the El Paso County Sheriff.
9	Lockhart	C. K.	August 10, 1899		
10	White	James H.	August 16, 1901		previously served as El Paso County Sheriff
11	Edwards	Peyton J.	April 3, 1903		First turn of two as Chief; would serve as El Paso County Sheriff from 1910–1916 before his second turn as Chief.
12	Mitchell	W. A.	November 8, 1906		
13	Campbell	George C.		January 7, 1909	resigned, unlisted in Annual Reports
13.5	Eyck	Will Ten			interim
14	Jenkins	Benjamin F.	January 21, 1909		First turn of two as Chief
15	Davis	I. N.	March 14, 1912		
16	Johnson	Don	May 4, 1915		
17	Zabriski	B. J.	June 6, 1916		
18	Pollock	Charles E.	October 11, 1917		
19	Phoenix	P. Harry	January 9, 1919		Incorrectly given in Annual Reports as "H. P.". Would die in 1921 by gunfire in the line of duty.
20	Montgomery	J. R.	July 3, 1919		Middle initial is incorrectly given as "A." in Annual Reports.
21	Edwards	Peyton J.	December 2, 1920		Second turn of two as Chief
22	Jenkins	Benjamin F.	December 7, 1922		Second turn of two as Chief
23	Reeder	J. D.	May 31, 1923		
24	Armstrong	T. C.	October 12, 1925		
25	Robey	Lawrence T.	August 1, 1928		First of three turns as Chief
26	Lackland	Thomas G.	June 7, 1937		
27	Fitzgerald	J. W.	January 24, 1938		
28	Robey	Lawrence T.	August 16, 1939		Second of three turns as Chief
29	Drennan	Robert D.	November 1, 1943		
30	Robey	Lawrence T.	August 16, 1945		Third of three turns as Chief
31	Fitzgerald	J. W.	December 12, 1948		
32	Woolverton	W. C.	April 14, 1949		
33	Vinson	W. R.	May 1, 1951		
34	Risinger	John C.	October 1, 1953		
35	Jones	Howard	November 16, 1957		
36	Horak	Charles J.	May 1, 1959		
37	Chokiski	Earl L.	November 24, 1965		
38	Minnie	Robert E.	February 25, 1971	c. January 1971	
38.5	Messer	Joseph	c. January 1971	June 1977	interim
39	Rodriguez	William "Bill" E.	June 9, 1977	1986	
39.5	Messer	Joseph	August 1986	February 1987	interim
40	Scagno	John	February 24, 1987	May 1994	
40.5	Fluck	Henry K.	1994	1995	interim
41	Leach	Russ	1995	July 17, 1998	
41.5	Grijalva	Felix "J. R.", Jr.			interim
42	Leon	Carlos	1999	August/September 2003	resigned
42.5	Wiles	Richard	September 17, 2003	July 27, 2004	interim
43	Wiles	Richard	July 27, 2004	December 26, 2007	retired then successfully ran for El Paso County Sheriff in 2008
43.5	Allen	Greg	January 11, 2008	March 31, 2008	interim
44	Allen	Greg	March 31, 2008	January 17, 2023	died in office
44.5	Pacillas	Peter	February 3, 2023	October 2, 2023	interim
45	Pacillas	Peter	October 2, 2023	present	

== Fallen officers ==
Since 1883, 31 municipal officers have died while on duty.

Officer	End of watch	Cause of death
Thomas P. Moad	July 11, 1883	Gunfire
Newton Stewart	February 17, 1900	Gunfire
William Paschall	December 4, 1914	Gunfire
Gus Chitwood	February 13, 1915	Gunfire
Sidney J. Benson	June 28, 1917	Gunfire
Juan M. Garcia	February 1, 1918	Gunfire
Octaviano Perea	February 2, 1918	Gunfire
George Franklin Drake	September 22, 1918	Vehicular assault
Harry Phoenix	June 13, 1921	Gunfire
Frank Burns	April 12, 1923	Gunfire
Enrique "Yaqui" Rivera	November 25, 1923	Gunfire
John Jack Coleman	July 14, 1924	Gunfire
Lynn Reed McClintock	October 3, 1926	Vehicle pursuit
Schuyler C. Houston*	October 4, 1927	Gunfire
Ralph O. Marmolejo	March 17, 1951	Gunfire
Warren Mitchell	May 16, 1953	Gunfire
Guillermo "Willie" Sanchez	December 14, 1957	Gunfire
Arthur Joe Lavender, Jr.	December 16, 1966	Motorcycle accident
Roger A. Hamilton	June 21, 1970	Vehicular homicide
Guy Ray Myers, Jr.	July 24, 1970	Motorcycle accident
David Bannister	June 3, 1974	Vehicle pursuit
Wayne V. Carreon	June 10, 1981	Struck by vehicle
Charles Douglas Heinrich	August 29, 1985	Gunfire
Normal Michael Montion	October 16, 1989	Gunfire
Ernesto Serna	November 12, 1991	Gunfire
Angel Andrew Barcena	September 25, 2004	Gunfire
Karl R. McDonough	October 13, 2010	Vehicular assault
Jonathan Keith Molina	October 5, 2012	Assault
Angel David Garcia	December 16, 2012	Struck by vehicle
Adrian Arellano	March 18, 2015	Motorcycle Crash
David Ortiz	March 14, 2016	Vehicular Assault

- Houston is not listed on the official department website, but is listed on the Officer Down Memorial Page.

== Misconduct ==
On April 21, 1993, El Paso police department officers arrested a 16-year-old boy and coerced him to sign a false prepared confession through intimidation and threats for an April 10 double murder which he did not commit. He would spend 23 1/2 years in prison and endure three trials before finally being acquitted in October 2018.

In June 2009, Sergeant Miguel Lucero began an inappropriate relationship with a female student at a Riverside High School where he was assigned. He later pleaded guilty to “Improper Relationship Between an Educator and Student.” He was sentenced to 400 hours of community service and a fine.

In 2012, seventeen officers were indicted on charges of faking records to gain overtime pay. In October of that year, one officer named Scott McFarland pleaded guilty to 35 counts. He was fined and ordered to undergo drug and alcohol testing.

On November 10, 2020, 1.2 kilograms of cocaine and a large sum of money were seized from a "drug-involved premise" run by a woman who was an El Paso Police officer at the time and her stepfather, who was the home owner. The officer, Monica Garcia, would use her position and its resources to avoid surveillance and detection. Garcia pleaded guilty August 9, 2021 to helping run the drug house.

== See also ==
- List of law enforcement agencies in Texas
