= Peter Kern =

Peter Kern may refer to:

- Peter Kern (actor) (1949–2015), Austrian actor, film director, screenwriter, and producer
- Peter Kern (American businessman) (1835–1907), German-born American businessman and politician
- Peter E. Kern (1860–1937), American jeweler and real-estate entrepreneur
