= El Paso Streetcar =

Streetcar system in El Paso, Texas, United States

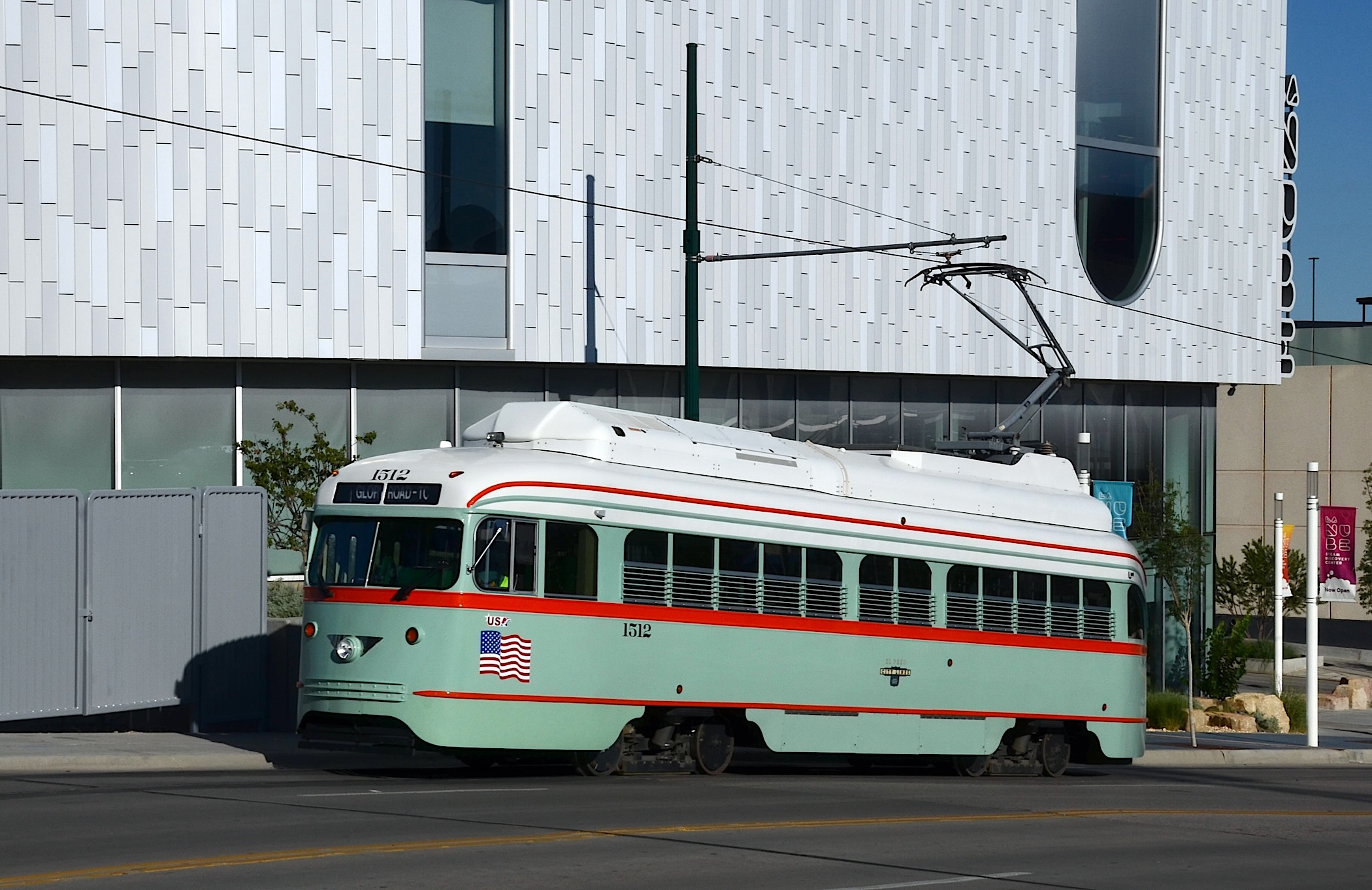
- A streetcar in the 1970s color scheme on Santa Fe Street, downtown

Overview
- Locale: El Paso, Texas, U.S.
- Stations: 27 stops
- Website: sunmetro.net/streetcar

Service
- Type: Streetcar
- Services: 2
- Operator: Sun Metro
- Rolling stock: 6 refurbished PCC streetcars
- Daily ridership: 1,300 (weekdays, Q1 2026)
- Ridership: 396,200 (2025)

History
- Opened: November 9, 2018

Technical
- Line length: 4.8 mi (7.7 km) (round trip)
- Number of tracks: 1
- Character: Streetcar in mixed traffic
- Track gauge: 4 ft 8 1/2 in (1,435 mm) standard gauge
- Electrification: Overhead line, 650 V DC

The El Paso Streetcar is a streetcar system in El Paso, Texas, that uses a fleet of restored PCC streetcars that had served the city's previous system until its closure in 1974. It opened for service on November 9, 2018. The system covers 4.8 miles (7.7 km) (round trip) in two loops from Chihuahuita to Kern Place, serving Downtown El Paso and University of Texas at El Paso along the way. The system was constructed under the authority of the Camino Real Regional Mobility Authority, but when the major construction was completed, around spring 2018, it was transferred to Sun Metro, for operation and maintenance. In 2025, the system had a ridership of 396,200, or about 1,300 per weekday as of the first quarter of 2026.

== History ==
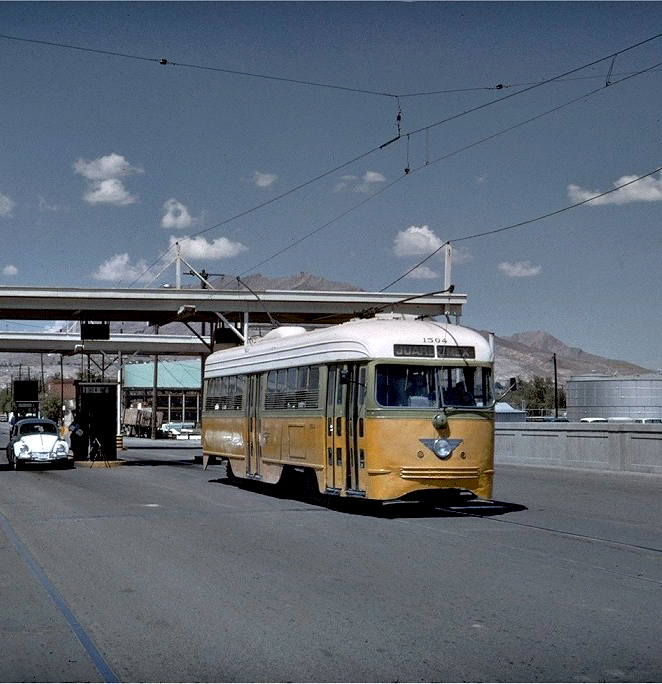
Streetcar 1504 on the former El Paso–Juárez streetcar line in the 1960s. This streetcar would later be refurbished, and is currently in service for the restored network.

Historically, the cities of El Paso and Ciudad Juárez relied on a unified streetcar system across the Rio Grande which initially consisted of horse and mule-drawn trolleys, which were replaced by the first electrified street cars in 1902. In 1913, the first urban streetcar lines appeared. Between 1920 and 1925, there were 52 miles (83 km) of trolley system, with 2.1 million passengers using the service in 1922. The increasing availability of the automobile led El Paso to abandon most of its streetcar infrastructure in the 1940s, with the exception of the international line, which was renewed with 20 PCC streetcars from San Diego in 1950.

The international line formed a complete loop, which operated in one direction. This made it perhaps the only streetcar line in which a passenger boarding in either city, and returning later to his starting point, had to pass twice through customs and immigration between two countries. This line abruptly ceased operations on July 31, 1973 as a result of a labor dispute.

On May 4, 1974, the last remaining cars in use made their final trips. They were taken to a desert area by the airport, where they eventually rusted and decayed.

=== Revival ===
On June 5, 2012, the city council unveiled a new route, creating a narrow loop for the service; streetcars would travel north on Stanton Street, turn left at Glory Road/Baltimore, then south on Oregon Street. A downtown loop runs east on Franklin Avenue, south on Kansas Street, west on Father Rahm, and north on Santa Fe Street. The El Paso City Council approved going forward with the project in July 2014.

Construction began in late December 2015. As of 2016, construction of the system was projected to cost $97 million. In November 2016, the city disclosed that construction funds had been extorted in a phishing scam perpetrated by an entity posing as a contractor – most of the funds had been recovered by the time it was publicly announced. By March 2018, construction was 95 percent complete. The first of the refurbished streetcars was received on March 19, 2018, and the first test trip on the line under power was made on April 3.

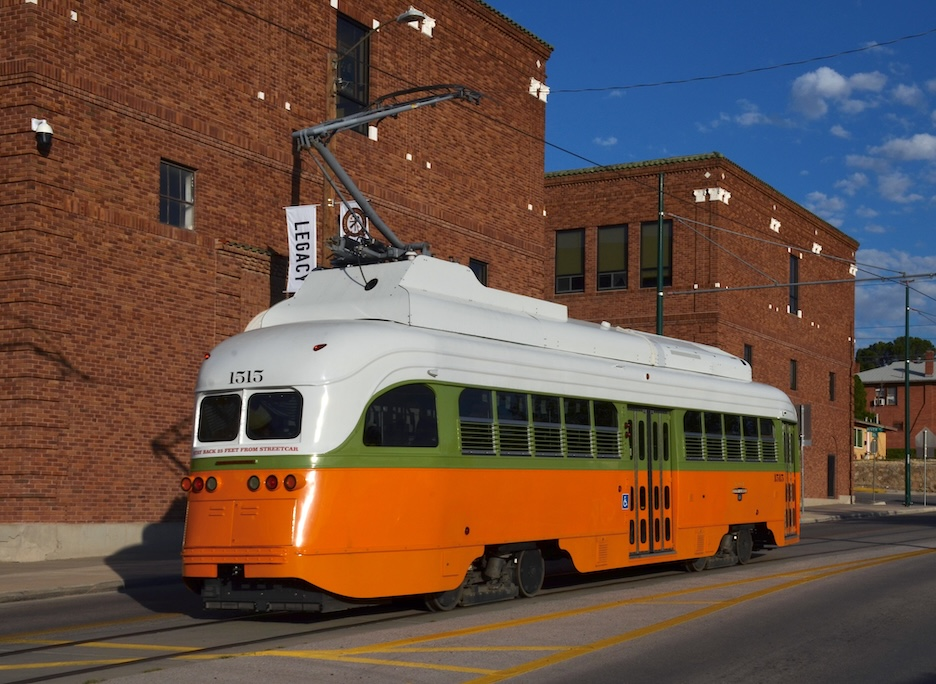
An El Paso streetcar in the 1950s color scheme, of National City Lines, on Stanton Street in 2025

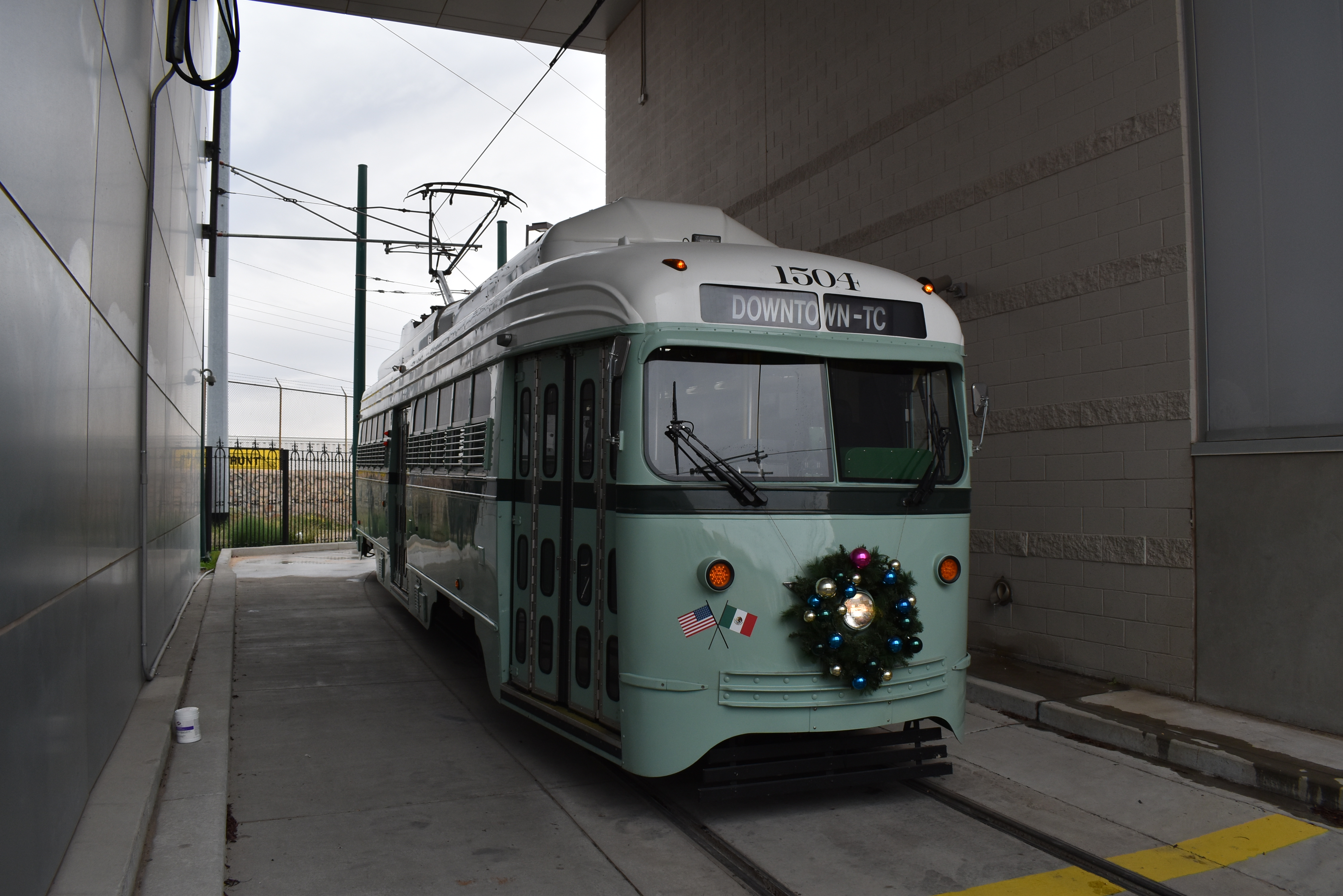
A PCC streetcar at the carbarn, in downtown, wearing the 1960s paint scheme

The system opened on Friday, November 9, 2018. On the three-day opening weekend, just six of the 27 stops were being served, from Santa Fe & 4th to Kansas & Mill, but all other stops were due to open on November 12, 2018. Fares are based on Sun Metro's fare structure, which means a $1.50 fare for riders not qualifying for any reduction; $1 for students and children; $0.30 for seniors. All rides were free on Fridays, Saturdays, and Sundays until January 5, 2019. 24-hour passes were priced at $3.50 and seven-day passes cost between $2.50 and $12.

Streetcar service was suspended on March 22, 2020, due to the COVID-19 pandemic, but resumed on Thursdays, Fridays, and Saturdays starting on July 29, 2021, and with all fares waived. Service on Sundays and Wednesdays was restored effective August 31, 2022.

On September 3, 2023, Sun Metro announced extended hours for the streetcar, including expansion to seven-days-a-week service, and continuing to be fare-free on both lines of the route.

== Rolling stock ==
City officials expressed their desire to preserve the history of El Paso by refurbishing the eight old PCC streetcars that once served the city's transit system, which were stored in a desert area at the El Paso International Airport. These cars were originally manufactured in 1937 for the San Diego Electric Railway in San Diego, California.

Work to restore six cars to operating condition began in 2015 and was carried out by Brookville Equipment Corporation. The cars are painted in color schemes used by the previous El Paso streetcar system from the 1950s until its closure in the 1970s, with three different versions – representing the 1950s, 1960s, and 1970s – used on two cars each. Modifications to the cars included the installation of wheelchair lifts, to comply with the Americans with Disabilities Act, half-diamond pantographs in place of trolley poles, and the addition of air conditioning. They have kept their original fleet numbers of 1504, 1506, 1511, 1512, 1514, and 1515.

The first of the restored streetcars, No. 1506, was received from Brookville on March 19, 2018. By mid-October, all but one of the six had been received. The last of the six streetcars to complete its restoration, No. 1511, was received on December 19, 2018.

== List of streetcar stops ==
from Downtown El Paso to UTEP, then back to downtown based on Figure 8 Loop order

Downtown Loop Uptown Loop

No.	Stop	Intersection	Direction	Loop	Destination(s)
1	Downtown Transit Center	Santa Fe Street & Fourth Avenue	north		Downtown Transit Center; Streetcar Maintenance & Storage Facility
2	Overland	Santa Fe & Overland Avenue	north		
3	Convention Center	Santa Fe & Sheldon Court	north		Williams Convention Center
4	Cleveland Square	Franklin Avenue & El Paso Street	east		Cleveland Square Park; Southwest University Park
5	San Jacinto	Franklin & Mesa Street	east		San Jacinto Plaza
6	Missouri	Stanton Street & Missouri Avenue	north		
7	Montana	Stanton & Yandell Avenue	north		
8	Arizona	Stanton & Arizona Avenue	north		
9	Cathedral	Stanton & California Avenue	north		Cathedral High School
10	Rim	Stanton & Rim Road	north		
11	Kern	Stanton & Kerbey Avenue	north		Kern Place
12	Cincinnati District	Stanton & Cincinnati Avenue	north		
13	Baltimore	Baltimore Drive & Mesa	west		
14	Glory Road Transit Center	Oregon Street & Glory Road	south		Glory Road Transit Center
15	Boston	Oregon & Boston Avenue	south		
16	University	Oregon & University Avenue	south		University of Texas at El Paso (UTEP)
17	Hague	Oregon & Hague Road	south		
18	Schuster	Oregon & Rim Road	south		
19	Cliff	Oregon & Cliff Drive	south		
20	Rio Grande	Oregon & Rio Grande Avenue	south		El Paso Community College
21	Yandell	Oregon & Yandell	south		
22	Arts District	Oregon & Missouri	south		El Paso Public Library; Museum of History
23	City Hall	Kansas Street & Mills Avenue	south		El Paso City Hall
24	Courthouse	Kansas & San Antonio Avenue	south		El Paso County Courthouse
25	1st Avenue	Kansas & First Avenue	south		
26	Stanton	Father Rahm Avenue & Stanton	west		
27	El Paso	Father Rahm & El Paso	west		

== See also ==
- List of Texas railroads
- Streetcars in North America
