= Union Depot (El Paso) =

Amtrak train station in El Paso, Texas

El Paso Union Depot
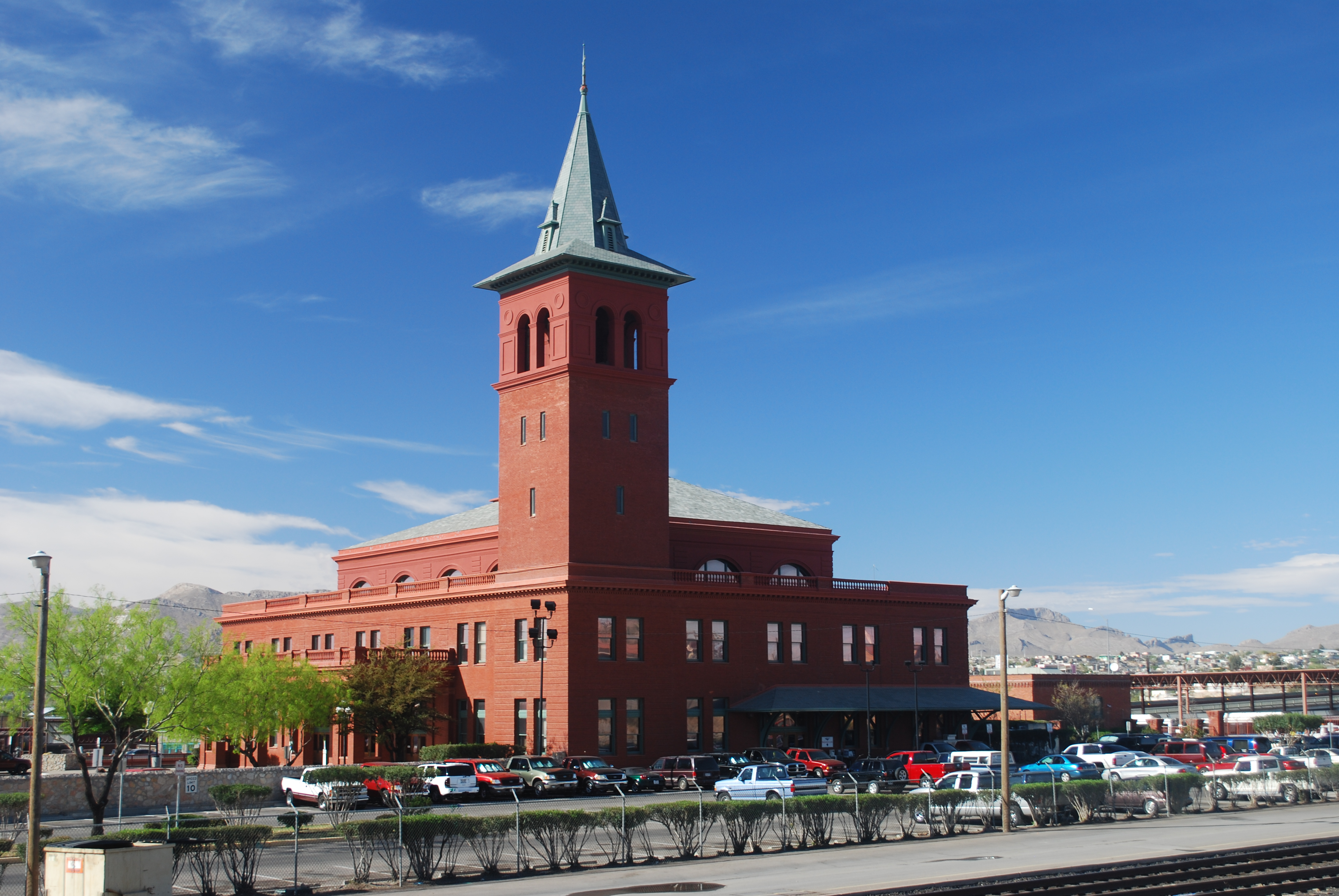

General information
- Location: 700 W San Francisco Street; El Paso, Texas; United States
- Coordinates: 31°45′26″N 106°29′45″W
- Owner: City of El Paso
- Line: UP Lordsburg Subdivision
- Platforms: 1 side platform
- Tracks: 1
- Connections: El Paso Streetcar; Sun Metro: 4

Construction
- Accessible: Yes

Other information
- Station code: Amtrak: ELP

History
- Opened: 1906
- Rebuilt: 1982

Passengers
- FY 2025: 14,676 (Amtrak)

Services
Preceding station	Amtrak	Following station
Deming toward Los Angeles	Sunset Limited	Alpine toward New Orleans
Deming toward Los Angeles	Texas Eagle	Alpine toward Chicago
Former services
Preceding station	Atchison, Topeka and Santa Fe Railway	Following station
Terminus	El Paso Branch	Canutillo toward Albuquerque
Preceding station	Southern Pacific Railroad	Following station
Deming toward Los Angeles	Sunset Route	Marfa toward New Orleans
Terminus	Golden State Route	Orogrande toward Tucumcari
Preceding station	Missouri Pacific Railroad	Following station
Terminus	Texas and Pacific Railway Main Line	Durazno toward New Orleans
- El Paso Union Passenger Station
- U.S. National Register of Historic Places
- Recorded Texas Historic Landmark
- Texas State Antiquities Landmark
- Location: SW corner of Coldwell at San Francisco St., El Paso, Texas
- Area: 3 acres (1.2 ha)
- Built: 1905
- Architect: Daniel H. Burnham
- Architectural style: Classical Revival, Spanish Colonial Revival
- NRHP reference No.: 75001970
- RTHL No.: 1437
- TSAL No.: 238

Significant dates
- Added to NRHP: April 3, 1975
- Designated RTHL: 1982
- Designated TSAL: 3/7/1984
Location
- Location within Texas

El Paso Union Depot is an Amtrak train station in El Paso, Texas, served by the Texas Eagle and Sunset Limited. The station was designed by architect Daniel Burnham, who also designed Washington Union Station in Washington, D.C.. The station was built between 1905 and 1906 and was added to the National Register of Historic Places in 1971.

== History ==
The station served as a transfer point for several railroads. The Atchison, Topeka & Santa Fe ran a train north to Socorro, Belen and Albuquerque. The National Railways of Mexico operated a train, "El Fronterizo", numbers 7 & 8, south to Chihuahua City in Mexico. The Southern Pacific Railroad operated trans-continental trains west to California, and east to Louisiana via Texas. The Texas Pacific and then the Missouri Pacific Railroad operated trains to Fort Worth, Texas.

== Present ==
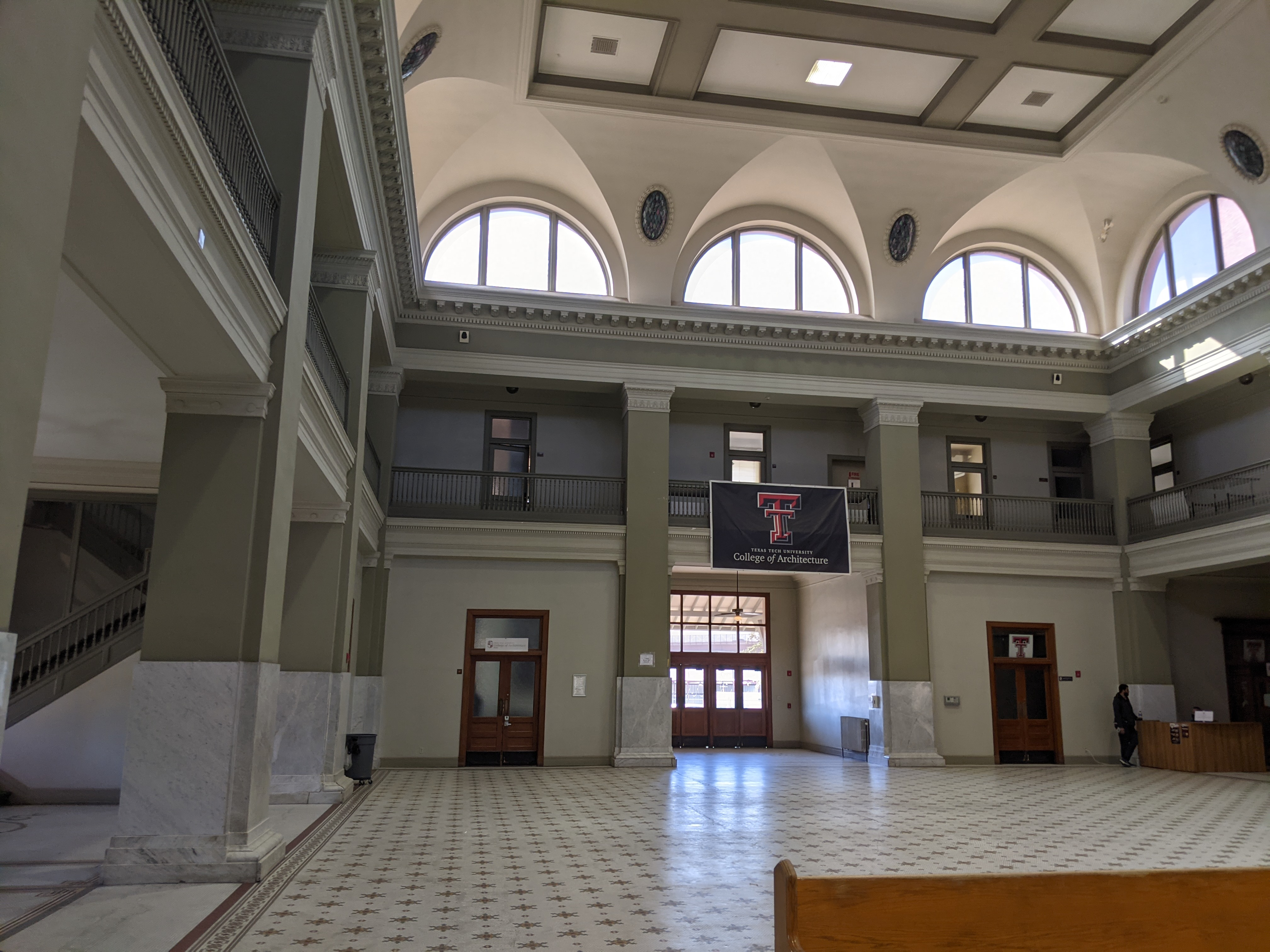
Texas Tech College of Architecture

In addition to Amtrak service, the station is served by Sun Metro local buses at nearby stops. There has been intermittent talk of resurrecting streetcar service across the border to Ciudad Juarez since the last trolley rolled in 1974.

The station's office space is occupied by the Texas Tech College of Architecture, which opened in 2013. Sun Metro was formerly headquartered in the space until it moved in 2014.

== See also ==
- National Register of Historic Places listings in El Paso County, Texas
- Recorded Texas Historic Landmarks in El Paso County
