= Deming station =

Amtrak train station in New Mexico, US

Deming, NM
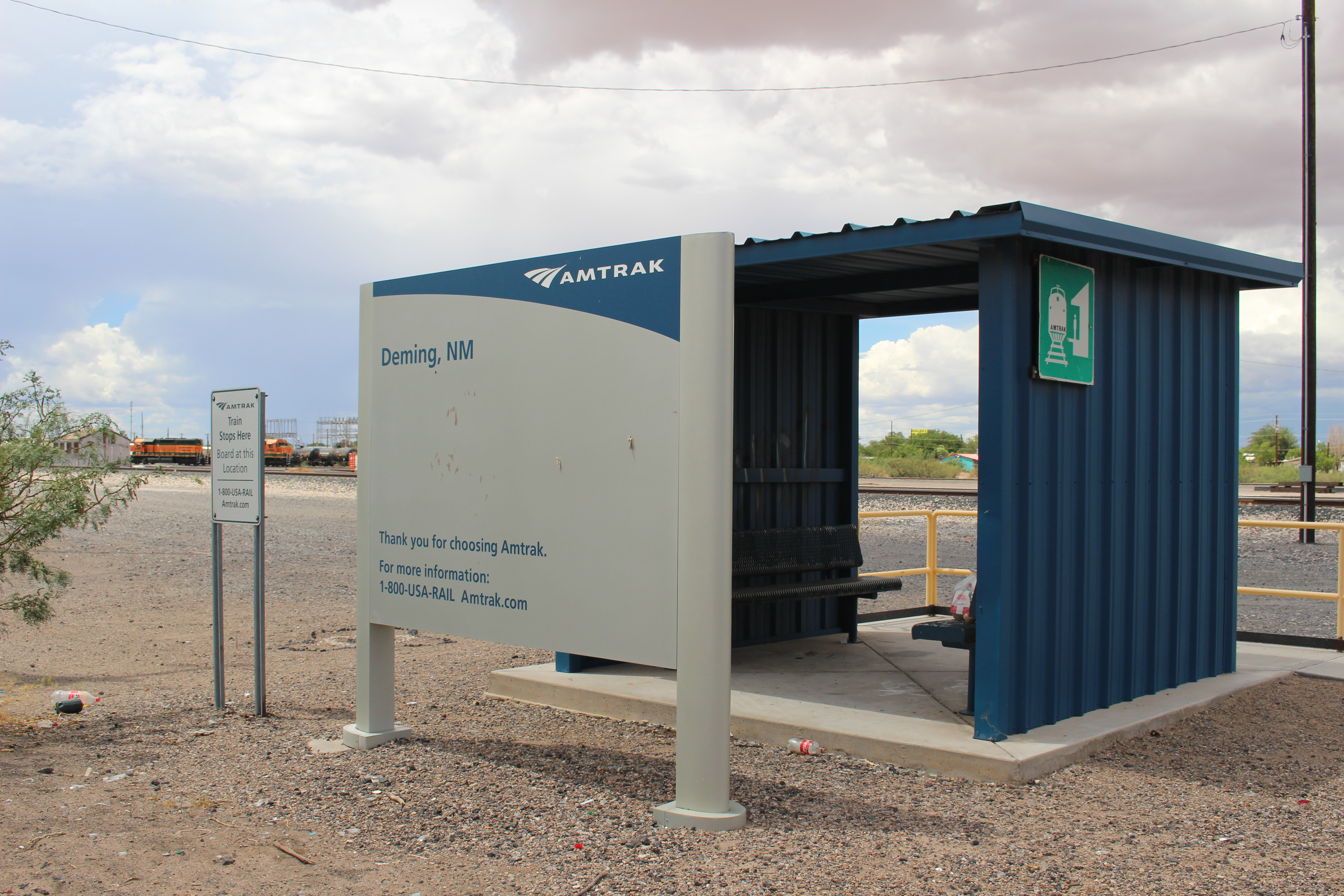
- Deming station shelter, August 2021

General information
- Location: 400 East Railroad Boulevard; Deming, New Mexico; United States
- Coordinates: 32°16′18″N 107°45′15″W
- Line: UP Lordsburg Subdivision
- Platforms: No platform
- Tracks: 2

Construction
- Parking: Yes
- Accessible: Yes

Other information
- Station code: Amtrak: DEM

History
- Opened: 1881

Passengers
- FY 2025: 1,523 (Amtrak)

Services
Preceding station	Amtrak	Following station
Lordsburg toward Los Angeles	Sunset Limited	El Paso toward New Orleans
Lordsburg toward Los Angeles	Texas Eagle	El Paso toward Chicago
Former services
Preceding station	Southern Pacific Railroad	Following station
Lordsburg toward Los Angeles	Sunset Route	El Paso toward New Orleans
Location

Deming station is an Amtrak train station at 400 East Railroad Boulevard in Deming, New Mexico. The station consists of a simple metal shelter with a bench inside (sometimes derisively called an "Amshack") with train information posted on a sign outside. There is no platform at this station, trains stop at a paved vehicle crossing where passengers board.

== History ==
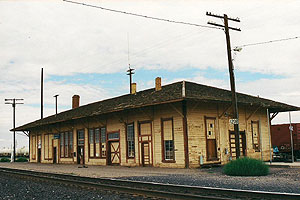
The former wooden frame station building

In March 1881, the second transcontinental railroad, uniting the Atchison, Topeka, and Santa Fe Railway from the east with the Southern Pacific Railway from the west, was completed at Deming. To mark the occasion, a silver spike was driven to connect the rails. Deming subsequently received a large two-story "union depot" that in 1930 was remodeled into a one-story structure.

The original old wood depot has since been moved and repurposed.
