= Lordsburg station =

Amtrak train station in New Mexico, United States

Lordsburg, NM
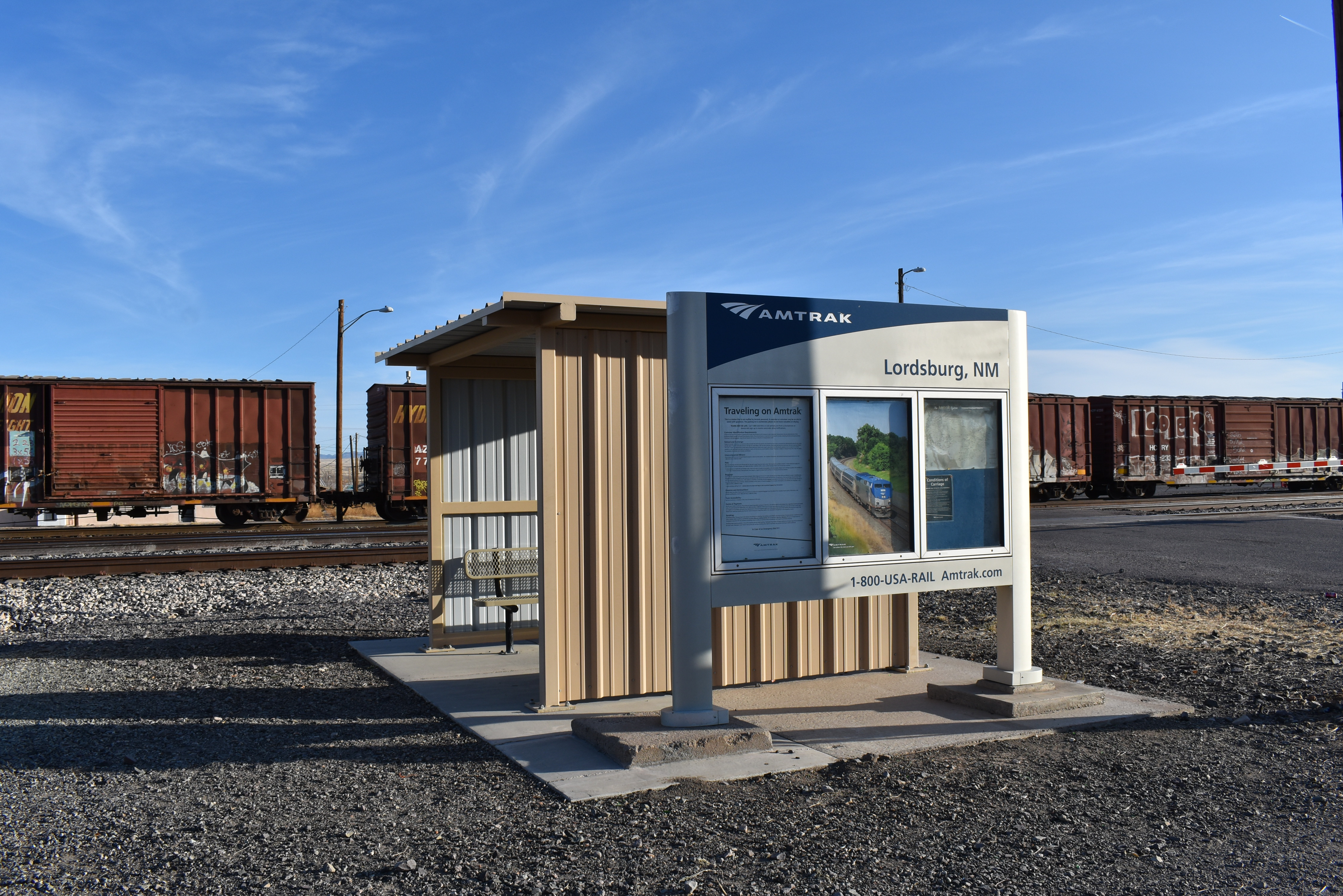
- Lordsburg station, with a simple metal shelter and benches

General information
- Location: Center Street and East Motel Drive; Lordsburg, New Mexico; United States
- Coordinates: 32°21′00″N 108°42′25″W
- Line(s): UP Lordsburg Subdivision
- Platforms: No platform
- Tracks: 4

Construction
- Parking: Yes
- Accessible: Yes

Other information
- Status: Unstaffed
- Station code: Amtrak: LDB

Passengers
- FY 2023: 688 (Amtrak)

Services
Preceding station	Amtrak	Following station
Benson toward Los Angeles	Sunset Limited	Deming toward New Orleans
Benson toward Los Angeles	Texas Eagle	Deming toward Chicago
Former services
Preceding station	Southern Pacific Railroad	Following station
Bowie toward Los Angeles	Sunset Route	Deming toward New Orleans
Location

Lordsburg station is an Amtrak train station located at Center Street and East Motel Drive, on the south side of the tracks, in Lordsburg, New Mexico, United States.

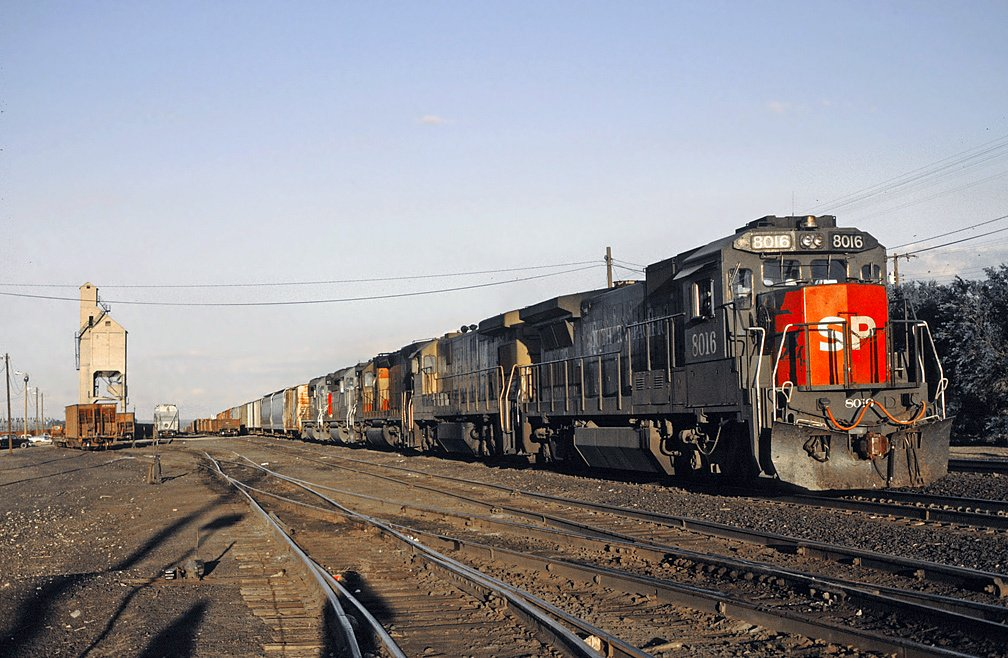
P B39-8E #8016 at Lordsburg in June 1993. Note the coaling tower in the background once used to fuel SP's AC9's

The wooden clapboard station building, once at the site, has been demolished. It has since been replaced with a simple metal shelter with a bench inside with train information posted on a sign outside. There is no platform at this station, trains stop at a paved vehicle crossing where passengers board.
