= Abraham Chavez Theatre =

Concert hall in El Paso, Texas

- Interactive map of Abraham Chavez Theatre
- Address: El Paso, Texas; United States
- Coordinates: 31°45′27″N 106°29′26″W
- Owner: City of El Paso
- Operator: ASM Global
- Capacity: 2,500

Construction
- Opened: 197?
- Architects: Carroll & Daeuble / Garland & Hilles

Website
- elpasolive.com/venues/abraham_chavez_theatre

Abraham Chavez Theatre, known simply as the Chavez Theatre, is a 2,500-seat concert hall located in El Paso, Texas. It is adjacent to the Williams Convention Center. Its lobby features a three-story glass main entrance. The Abraham Chavez Theatre is named after Maestro Abraham Chavez, who was the longtime conductor of the El Paso Symphony. It was built in the early 1970s, with the framework of the curved structure of the theatre visible under construction in scenes shot at the nearby Laughlin Hotel (since demolished) in the 1972 Steve McQueen film The Getaway.

Famous people who have performed here include Gabriel Iglesias, George Lopez and Joshua Ryan.

Inside, the theatre has a 5,000-square-foot (460 m^{2}) lobby and a 40-by-56-foot stage as well as 14 dressing rooms. The theater's seating is in three levels. There is also a meeting room adjacent to the theater.

Events held at Chavez Theatre include concerts, Broadway shows, graduation ceremonies, performances of the El Paso Symphony Orchestra, and other special events.

By late 2016, though the theatre was under consideration to be the designated home of the El Paso Mexican-American Cultural Center, a significant impediment was the need for "extensive repairs" to the half-century-old building. Repeated City Council cancellations of El Paso's proposed Downtown Arena project may yet cause those funds to be reallocated to improvement of the Chavez Theatre, among other city facilities.
