= El Paso Fire Department =

The El Paso Fire Department (EPFD) provides fire protection services to El Paso, Texas, United States.

== History ==
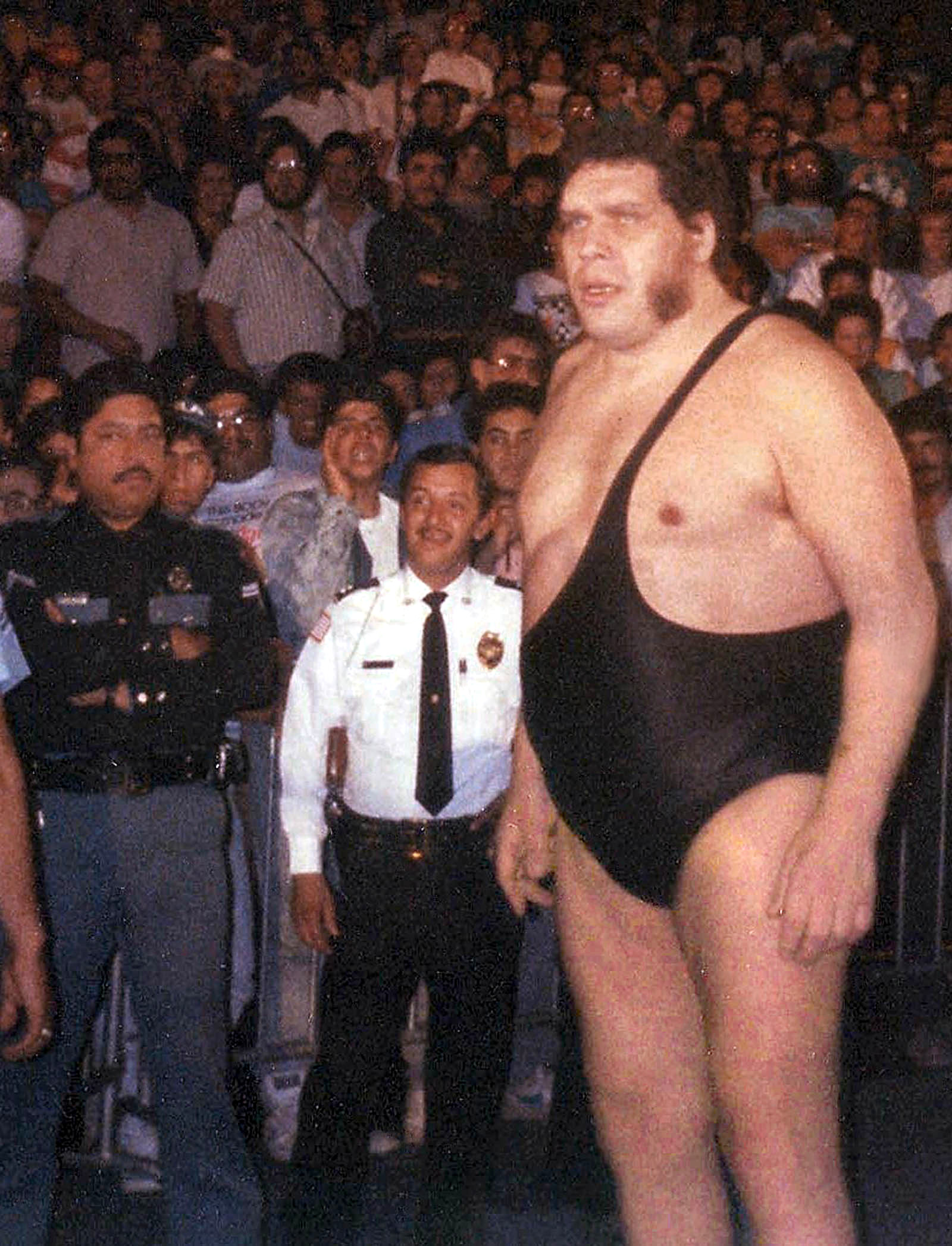
An El Paso Police patrol officer (dark uniform) and an El Paso fireman (light uniform) help provide security and protection at a 1989 wrestling event at the El Paso Civic Center.

Fire protection services for El Paso extend back to 1882. Firemen were mostly volunteer until a fully paid fire department was established in 1909.

== Chiefs ==
No.	Last	First	Start date	Finish date	Notes
16	Killings	Jonathan	December 9, 2022	present	
15.5	Killings	Jonathan	May 2022	December 9, 2022	Interim fire chief
15	D'Agostino	Mario	April 13, 2017	2022	
14.5	D'Agostino	Mario			Interim fire chief
14	Peña	Samuel	March 7, 2013	December 10, 2016	
13.5	Carmona	Carlos			Interim fire chief
13	Drozd	Otto, III	April 2009	November 2012	
12	Rivera	Roberto	2002	2008	
11	Johns	Glenn	1996	2001	
10	Mehl	Andrew	1988	1996	
9	Wilson	Joe H.	1984	1988	
8	Coleman	Marion	1968	1984	
7	Farr	W. L.	1962	1968	
6	Davis	H. A.	1950	1962	
5	Boone	Joe H.	1942	1950	
4	Jackson	W. E.	1940	1942	
3	Sullivan	John T.	1927	1940	
2	Wray	John	1915	1927	
1	Armstrong	W. W.	1909	1915	

== Stations ==
Station Number (built)	Address	Pumper Company	Ladder or Quint Company	Ambulance	Specialty Unit
Central (1982)	201 S. Florence	Pumper 1	Ladder 1	Rescue 1	Battalion1
2	111 E. Borderland	Pumper 2		Rescue 2	Attack 2
3 (1930)	721 E. Rio Grande	Pumper 3		Rescue 3	Water Rescue 3
4 (1949)	1218 Randolph			Rescue 4	
5	400 Revere St.	Pumper 5 Pumper 13	Ladder 5	Rescue 5	Battalion 3, Squad 1, HazMat 1
6	1850 Firehouse Dr.	Pumper 6		Rescue 6	
7 (1958)	3200 Pershing Ave.	Pumper 7	Quint 7	Rescue 7	
8 (1948)	301 E. Robinson	Pumper 8			
9	47 Dallas	Pumper 9		Rescue 9 Medic 9	
10 (1930)	1801 Montana	Pumper 10			
11 (2002)	314 S. Leon	Pumper 11	Ladder 11		Special Rescue 11
12 (1947)	3801 Fort Blvd	Pumper 12		Rescue 12	
14 (1955)	6300 Delta	Pumper 14		Rescue 14	
15 (1956)	115 Shorty Ln.	Pumper 15 Pumper 51			
16 (1969)	3828 Hercules	Pumper 16	Quint 16	Rescue 16	Decon 16
17 (1958)	8803 Alameda	Pumper 17	Quint 17	Rescue 17	
18 (1958)	7901 San Jose	Pumper 18	Quint 18	Medic 18	
19 (1959)	2405 McRae	Pumper 19		Rescue 19	
20 (1960)	8301 Edgemere	Pumper 20	Quint 20	Rescue 20	Rehab 20
21 (1960)	10000 Dyer	Pumper 21		Rescue 21 Medic 21	
22 (1960)	6500 N. Mesa	Pumper 22	Ladder 22	Rescue 22 Medic 22	Battalion 2
23 (1967)	5315 Threadgill	Pumper 23		Rescue 23	Battalion 5
24 (1975)	1498 Lomaland	Pumper 24	Ladder 24	Rescue 24	Battalion 4, Decon 24
25 (1978)	10834 Ivanhoe	Pumper 25		Rescue 25	
26 (1980)	9418 North Loop	Pumper 26		Rescue 26	Attack 26
27	6767 Ojo De Agua	Pumper 27		Rescue 27	
28	10820 McCombs		Quint 28	Rescue 28	
29 (2001)	11977 Pellicano	Pumper 29		Rescue 29	
30	4451 Loma Clara	Pumper 30			Attack 30
31	122 Mesa Park Dr.		Quint 31	Rescue 31	ROC 31
32	El Paso International Airport 101 George Perry Blvd.	ARFF1, ARFF2, ARFF3, ARFF4 ARFF5, ARFF6		Rescue 32	
33	3475 Nolan Richardson	Pumper 33		Rescue 33	ROC 33
34	6565 Angora Loop S.	Pumper 34			
35	12230 Pine Springs Dr.		Quint 35		Battalion 6
36 (2023)	1960 North Resler Dr.	Pumper 36			
37 (2013)	12950 RC Poe		Quint 37	Rescue 37	

== See also ==
- El Paso Police Department
