= El Paso County Sheriff's Office (Texas) =

The El Paso County Sheriff's Office (EPSO) handles law enforcement in El Paso County, Texas. The Office is headed by the County Sheriff, an elected official.

== Sheriff history ==
| No. | Last | First | Party | Start date | Finish date | Notes |
|---|---|---|---|---|---|---|
| 30 | Ugarte | Oscar | Democratic | January 1, 2025 | | |
| 29 | Wiles | Richard D. | Democratic | 2009 | December 31, 2024 | was the 43rd El Paso Police Department Chief prior to holding office |
| 28 | Apodaca | Santiago "Jimmy" | | January 15, 2008 | December 31, 2008 | appointed Sheriff to fulfill predecessor's term by the El Paso County Commissioner's Court in accordance with predecessor's wishes. |
| 27 | Samaniego | Leonardo "Leo" | Democratic | January 1, 1985 | December 28, 2007 | died December 28, 2007 while in office, requested Santiago "Jimmy" Apodaca finish his term. Was previously Deputy Chief of the El Paso Police Department. |
| 26 | Davis | Michael Patrick | | 1982 | | |
| 25 | Montes | Ramon "Ray" A. | | 1978 | | convicted of misconduct over vehicle impoundings (later reversed) |
| 24 | Sullivan | Mike, Jr. | | 1965 | August 14, 1978 | convicted of misconduct over use of public workers |
| 23 | Bailey | Robert "Bob" | | 1958 | | |
| 22 | Smith | Wesley | | April 25, 1958 | | |
| 21 | Hicks | W. O. "Jimmy" | | 1951 | 1958 | died by suicide while in office |
| 20 | Campbell | Joe | | 1949 | | |
| 19 | Falby | Allan George | | 1943 | | last name misspelled as "Farby" on the EPSO website's history page. First name often misspelled as "Allen". |
| 18 | Hawkins | William "Bill" Walker | | 1942 | | |
| 17 | Fox | Christian Petrus "Chris P." | | January 1933 | 1941 | resigned. Known by the moniker "Mr. El Paso". |
| 16 | Armstrong | Tom | | 1929 | | |
| 15 | Orndorff | Seth Buford | | 1916 | | last name misspelled as "Ordendorff" on the EPSO website's history page |
| 14 | Edwards | Peyton J. | | 1910 | 1916 | first name misspelled as "Payton" on the EPSO website's history page; was previously and subsequently El Paso Chief of Police |
| 13 | Hall | Florence J. | | 1908 | | |
| 12 | Comstock | James H. | | 1905 | | finished Boone's term after he resigned |
| 11 | Boone | James H. | | 1898 | June 1, 1905 | resigned |
| 10 | Simmons | Frank B. | | 1892 | | |
| 9 | Hildebrand | H. R. | | 1890 | | name spelled as "Hildebrant" on EPSO's history web page and "Hillebrand" or "Hilderbrand" in some sources; also served as the El Paso Chief of Police. |
| 8 | White | James H. | | 1883/4 | 1890 | later served as El Paso Chief of Police. |
| 7 | Mariany | Batista | | 1882 | | |
| 6 | Gonzalez | Benito | | 1880 | | ; resigned |
| 5 | Kerber | Charles | | 1874 | | See San Elizario Salt War. |
| 4 | Ellis | Charles | | 1871 | | Elected after an extremely complicated and contentious election related to Salt War issues. |
| 3 | Armendariz | Juan | | 1870 | | |
| 2 | Yates | William | | 1859 | | |
| 1 | Ford | William | | 1852 | | |

== See also ==
- Constable (Texas)
- Texas Ranger Division
