= Kern Place =

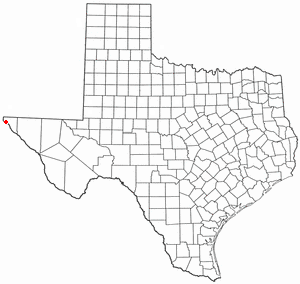
- Location in the state of Texas
- Coordinates: 31.783°N 106.499°W
- Country: United States
- State: Texas
- County: El Paso County
- City: El Paso
- Elevation: 3,850–4,080 ft (1,170–1,240 m)
- Time zone: UTC-6 (MDT)
  - Summer (DST): UTC-6 (CDT)

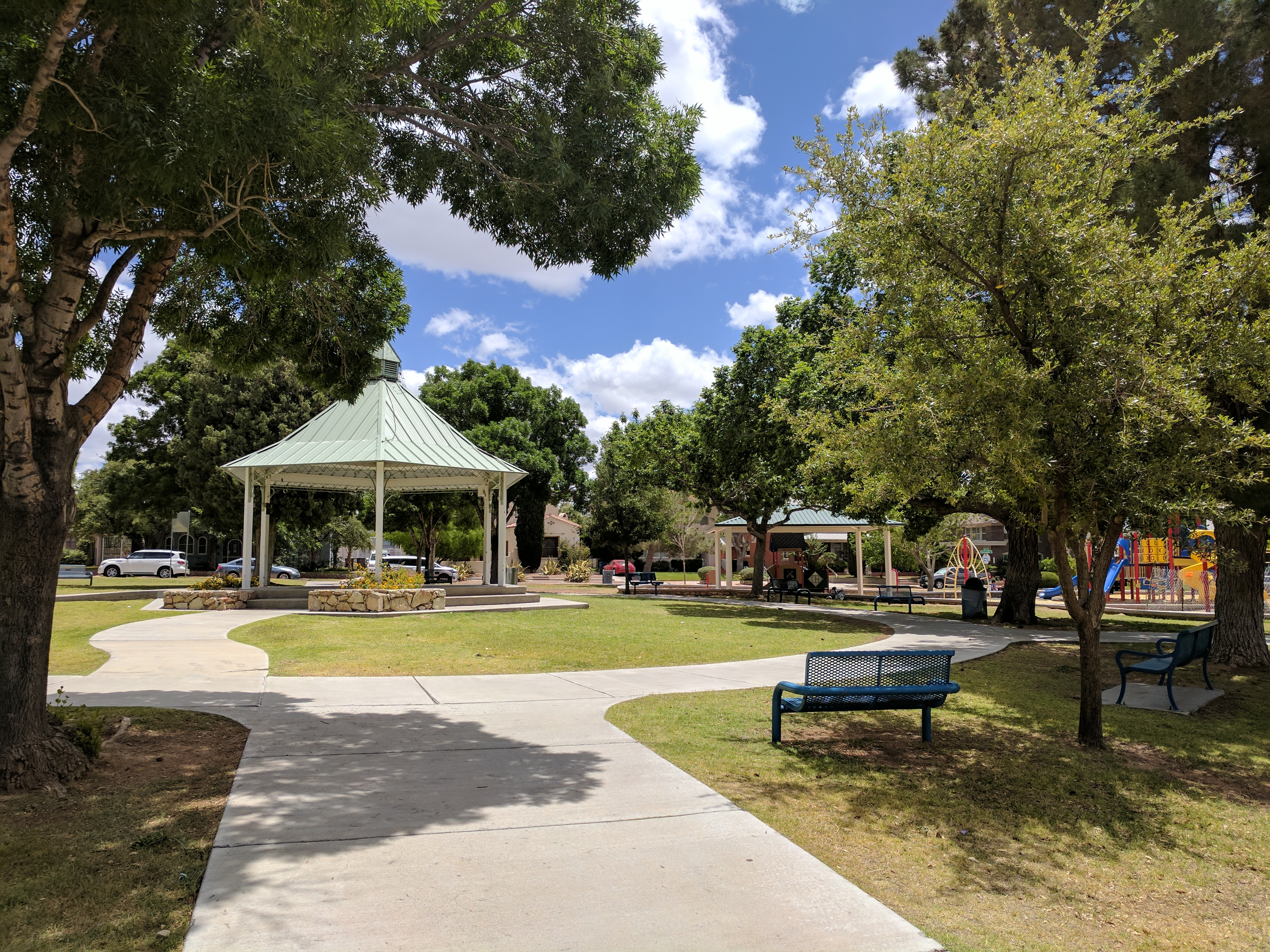
Madeline Park in Kern Place, 2017.

Kern Place is a historic neighborhood on the West side of El Paso, Texas. The neighborhood lies just east of the University of Texas at El Paso, and north of downtown. Kern is part of District 8 in the City of El Paso and currently represented on the City Council by Chris Canales. The neighborhood was created by Peter E. Kern, and once had an unusual gate marking the entrance. Madeline Park in the center of the neighborhood is named after Kern's daughter. Businesses and a small entertainment district border the eclectic housing featured in the neighborhood.

== History ==
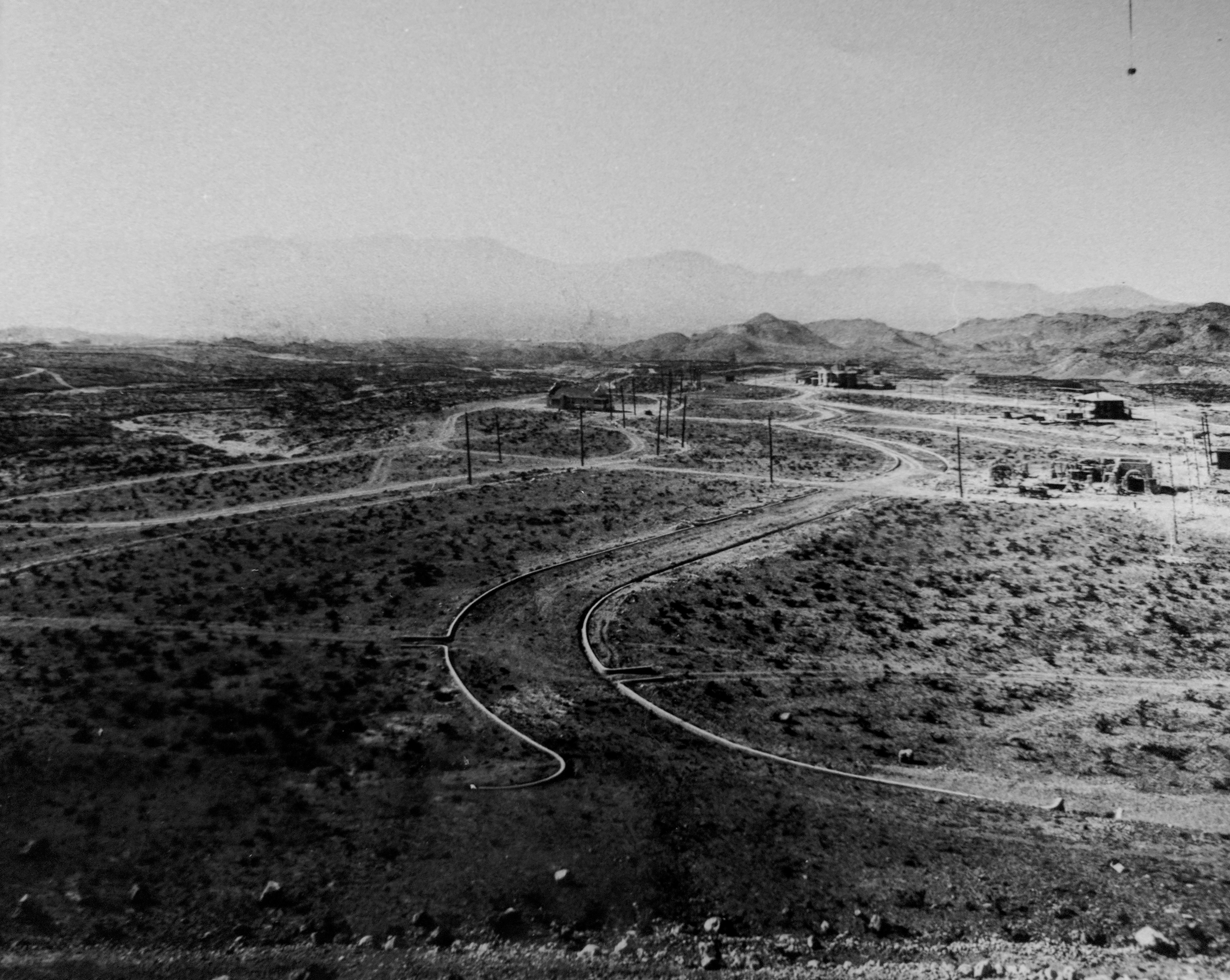
Land division where Kern Place was eventually built.

Kern Place was founded by Peter E. Kern (1860–1937), for whom the neighborhood was named. Kern first came to El Paso in 1881. In 1886, he purchased large amounts of land from Juan and Guadalupe Ascarate and the largest of his purchases, the McKelligon tract, became Kern Place subdivision.

In 1913, a paved road was created on Mesa Avenue and leading to the area known as Kern Place. Kern had an engineer, W.I. Rider, help him develop plans for the neighborhood. Construction began on November 21, 1914. A 1914 ad in the El Paso Herald described horse trails, planned parks, homes for sale under $3,500 and access to public transportation. Kern named the streets after friends and for places he "admired." Kern also did not want commercial properties on his land. Kern borrowed the money to develop the property from Texas Bank & Trust which later merged with First National Bank. In 1915, Kern had 500 trees planted in Madeline Park, located in Kern Place, which he gave to the city of El Paso later that same year. On May 4, 1926, Kern sold the land that made up Kern place.

In 1959, Clinton and Hal Dean Jr. bought Kern Place property and build the Kern Village Shopping Center.

In the 1970s, Kern Place was used strategically to demonstrate that there was a problem with lead contamination and the nearby ASARCO plant in El Paso. Investigators chose to show that wealthy children from the Kern Place area also had high levels of lead in their blood in order to combat the assertion that only poor, uneducated El Pasoans were being affected by the problem.

In 2001, a report was published by the Texas Department of State Health Services (TDSHS) documenting high levels of arsenic and lead in the soil in areas around Kern Place. Any community within 3 miles of the ASARCO plant found high levels of lead. Students who had gone to school in the area showed greater than average rates of developing multiple sclerosis (MS). Individuals in the neighborhood dealt with the health issue by washing hands more often after playing in nearby parks. Fourteen cases of MS were positively linked to the area around Kern Place and Mission Hills in a 1994 study.

=== The Kern Place Gate ===
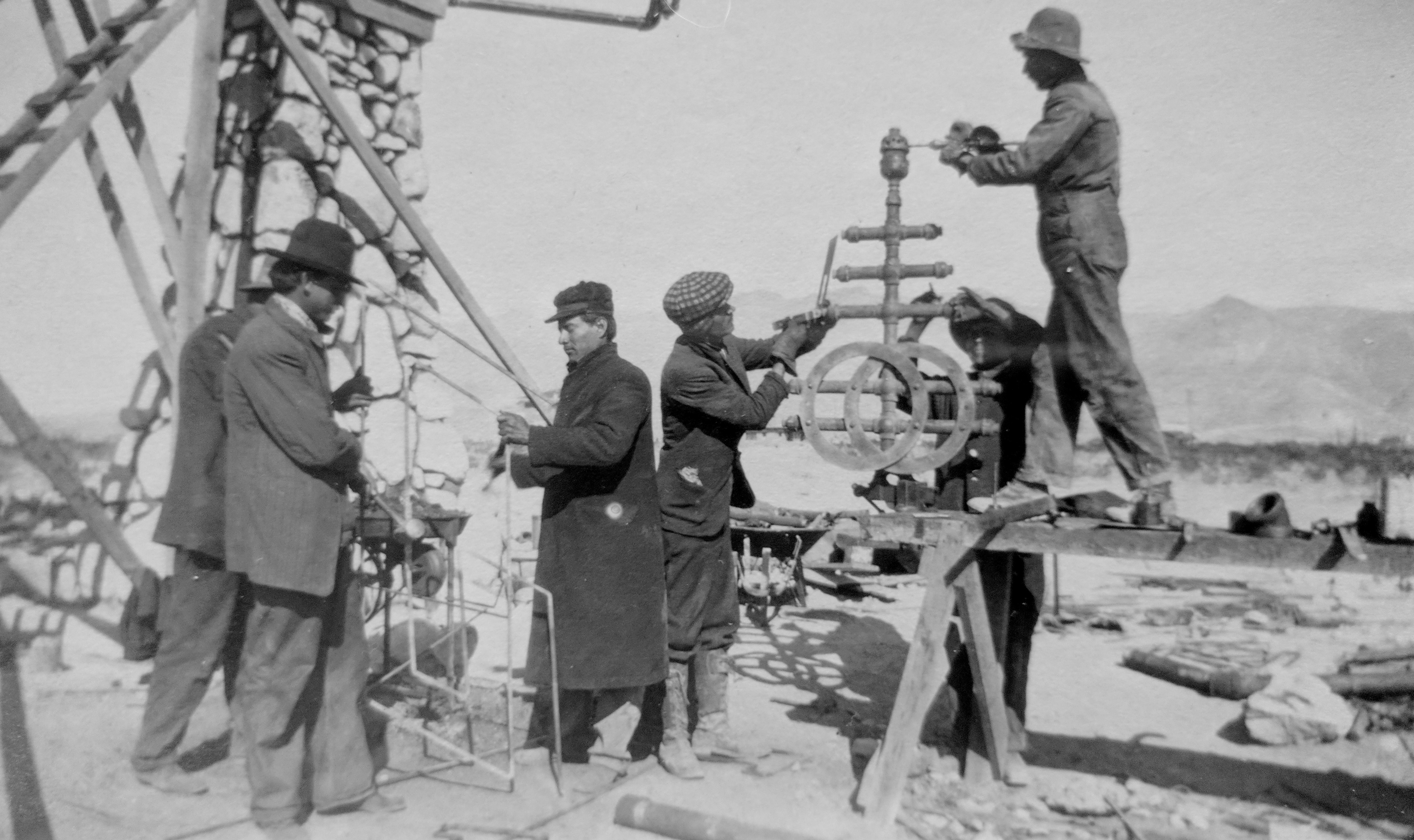
Building the Kern Place Gate, erected in 1916.

In 1916, Kern constructed a gate that formed an archway to the entrance of the neighborhood at the intersection of North Kansas Street and Robinson. The gate was made of iron and stone and cost $2,500. Kern found decedents of the Toltec and hired them to help build the gate.

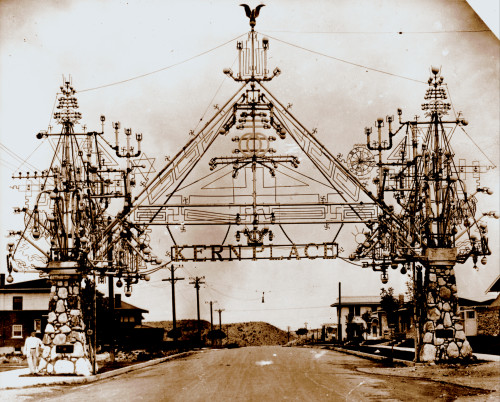
Gate erected outside of the Kern Place neighborhood in 1916.

The iron gate contained swastikas, the Kern family crest and 444 electric light globes that illuminated the words "Kern Place" over the center of the gate. It also had a Zondias calendar, totem poles from Alaska, and spelled out "Kern Place." The symbolism of the gate was meant to express ideas about "the brotherhood of man, light, life, health and wealth," according to the El Paso Herald-Post.

Kern wanted the gate to remain forever as "a monument and his legacy to the generation here and who will come after them." Pieces of the gate were taken over time by vandals, leaving only the pillars of stone. Eventually, the entire gate was dismantled in 1954 during a street-widening project.

A new gate has been proposed and built in 2017 as part of the Sun City Lights Project. The proposed gate is meant to reference the old Kern Place Gate and will be located on Cincinnati Street.

== Cityscape ==
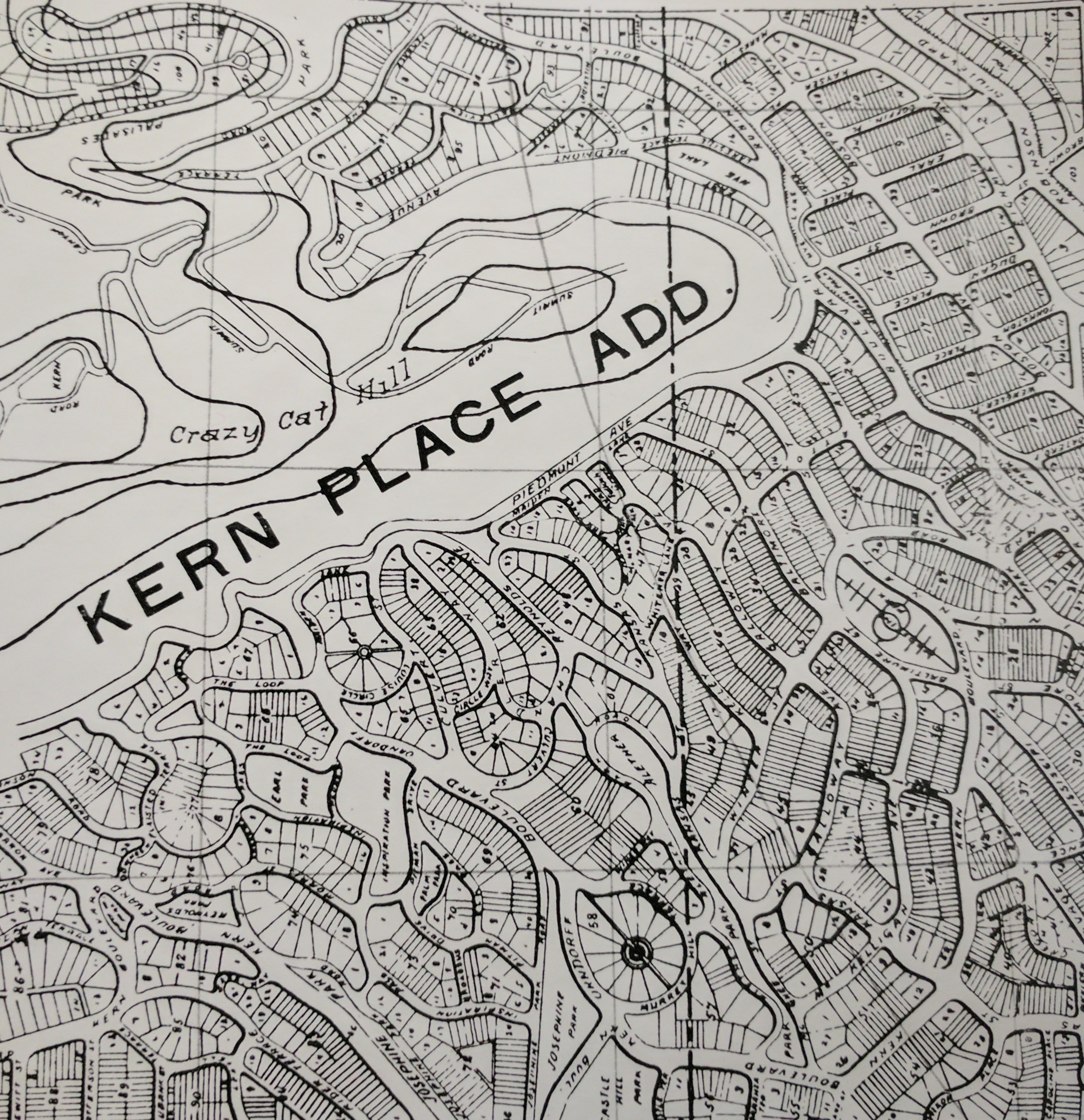
Kern Place Addition Map

Kern place is bordered by Mesa Street, Boston/Robinson, Piedmont and Mesita.

The homes of Kern Place are unique in architecture and some were built by residents themselves. One of the better known homes is the Paul Luckett Home located at 1201 Cincinnati Ave. above Madeline Park, and is made of local rock. It is known as "The Castle" due to its round walls and a crenelated rooftop.

One of the buildings, the Hoover House, was deeded to the University of Texas at El Paso (UTEP) in 1965 and serves as the residence of the president of UTEP.

The Cincinnati Entertainment District is part of Kern Place, and includes bars, restaurants and other businesses.

== Notable residents ==
- Richard M. Dudley
- Diana Natalacio
- Beto O'Rourke, boyhood home
- Cormac McCarthy

== See also ==
- Peter E. Kern
- Western use of the swastika in the early 20th century#As a Native American symbol
