= Peter E. Kern =

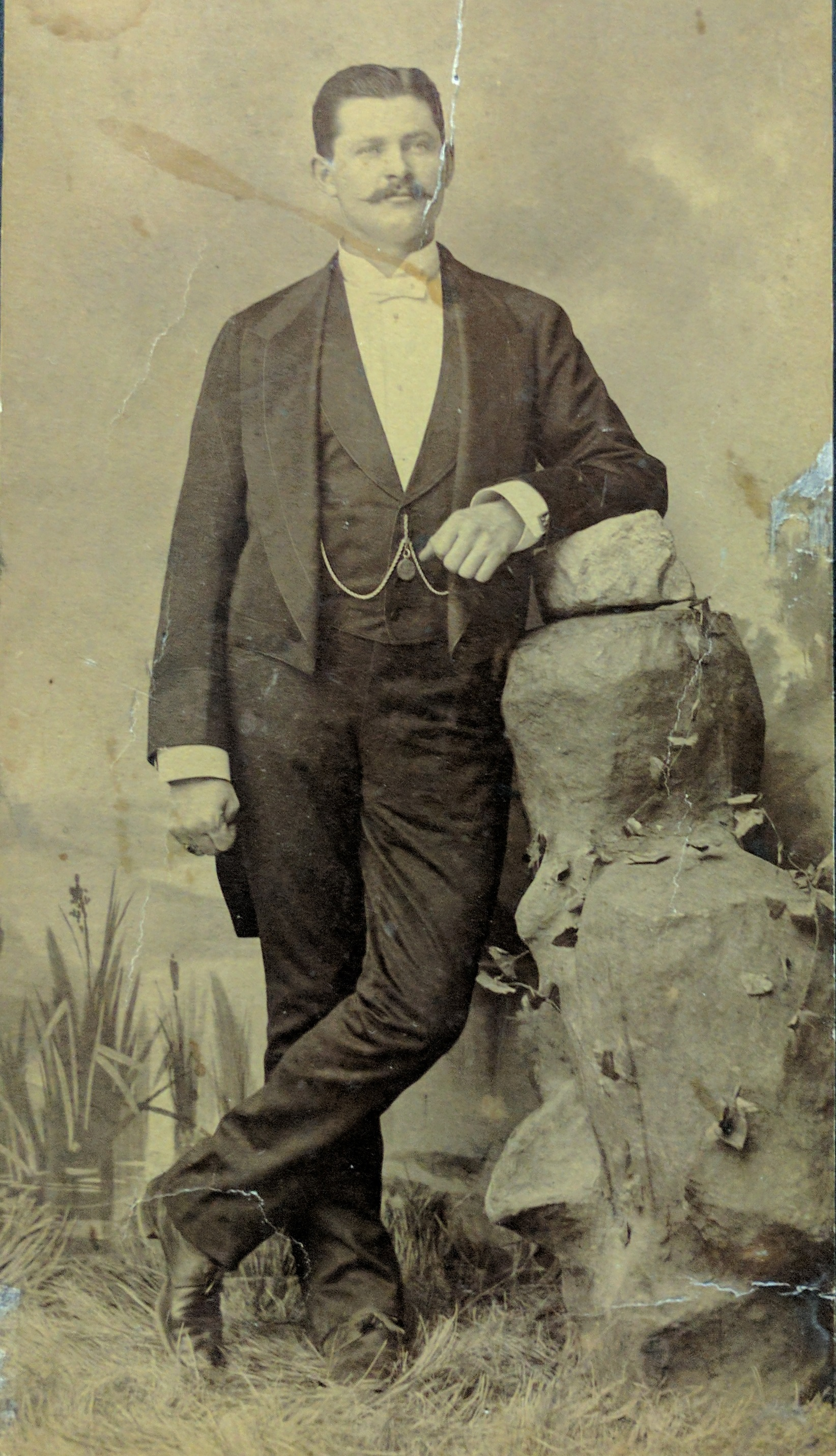
Peter E. Kern in 1883.

Peter E. Kern (October 13, 1860 - February 8, 1937) was a jeweler and real-estate entrepreneur in El Paso, Texas and Skagway, Alaska. Kern Place in El Paso is named after him. Kern was keenly interested in astrology. Kern was a Freemason and had been a member of the El Paso Lodge No. 130 for fifty years. He was also interested in the Egyptian swastika, which he made into jewelry and worked into various designs. Kern was also known for building the first Queen Anne house in the city, which was located on North Oregon Street. Kern lived at 1308 Cincinnati Street (renamed Avenue). The gate to the neighborhood was on Robinson Street:

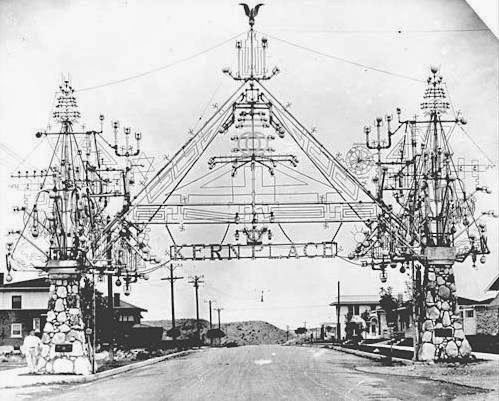
Gate to Peter Kern's neighborhood "Kern Place" located on Robinson Street.

== Biography ==
Kern was born in New Riegal, Ohio. His parents had emigrated from Switzerland and Luxembourg and Kern had two brothers and six sisters. When he was fifteen, he apprenticed as a jeweler in Sandusky, Ohio, finishing when he was 19. He then went to visit his brother in Kansas City in 1879, and then went on to work for the Rio Grande railroad for two years. When he arrived in Santa Fe, he bought goods for sale and made his way westward.

Kern first came to El Paso in 1881. Between then and 1896, Kern did business as a jeweler on El Paso Street. According to the El Paso Herald, it was one of the largest jewelry stores in the city at the time. He was well known for his swastika designs, which were considered a "good luck omen." In 1886, he purchased large amounts of land from Juan and Guadalupe Ascarate and the largest of his purchases, the McKelligon tract, became Kern Place subdivision. He met his first wife, Madeline Gregory, an army officer's daughter, at his shop and in 1886 he proposed and the couple was married in St. Louis.

Kern was also involved in the Elephant Butte Dam project. He had encouraged several other friends to build a dam there after a camping trip they took to the area in 1893.

In 1896, Kern went to Alaska to look for gold. Before he left for Alaska, he tried working in the jewelry business in Chicago for around two years. When his business failed, he chose to seek gold in the Klondike. His wife vowed to leave him if he went to Alaska, and so their marriage dissolved.

He settled in Skagway and created a jewelry shop where business was good. In 1902, he married again, to Marie Antoinette Somnier. Kern bought another building which he decorated with swastikas and later, he and two friends constructed "Castle Kern" in 1907. The castle was also painted with swastikas and was decorated with totem poles and animal heads. The castle cost around $15,000 and was a tourist attraction for some time. When Kern left Alaska in 1910, he sold the castle to Harriet Pullen, and sold his jewelry business to H.D. Kirmse. The castle burned down in a forest fire in 1912.

Kern's daughter, Madeline, joined him in 1908. In 1910, Kern returned to El Paso. Property he'd purchased before he'd left El Paso had increased in value over time. In that same year, he proposed the creation of a park, West Lake park, to the city. The proposed park would also include a speedway and a scenic area named Kelly park, after the mayor, Charles E. Kelly. Also in 1910, he apparently fraudulently persuaded his former wife to sign away her rights to the Kern property. Construction of Kern Place began on November 21, 1914. On December 26, 1914, Kern and others donated a block of land to the El Paso School for Girls. In 1918, Kern gave the El Paso Public Library several copies of the genealogy of his family.

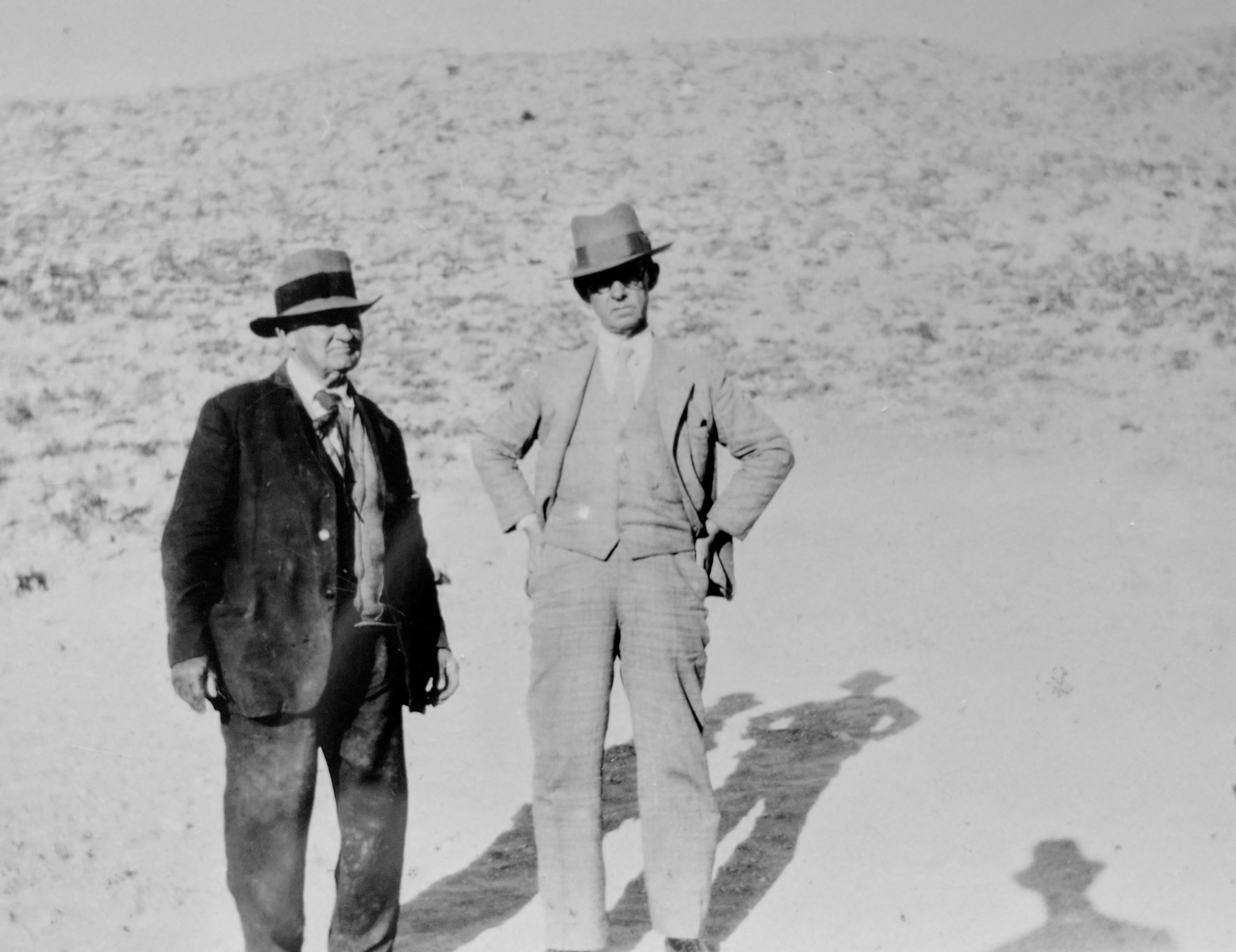
Peter E. Kern (on the left) in front of Crazy Cat Mountain in El Paso, Texas. Circa 1910s

Kern's daughter, Madeline (now Mrs. Madeline G. Merz), visited him in El Paso in 1924 and discovered that he had named many areas in Kern Place after her. She went to court on behalf of her mother, now known as Mrs. Madeline G. White, to have Kern Place considered a community property. In May 1925, she appealed her own suit, which had awarded the Kern property to the bank. Metz also sued the banks involved, and residents of Kern Place for rent, who then sued Kern for fraud. The resulting legal mess caused problems for the titles which Kern was also sued for fraud. The fraud lawsuits totaled to $1,610,000 on the first day.

By October 1925, Kern owed $75,000 for his properties. On May 4, 1926, Kern Place was sold. In 1930, he had lost all of his money and worked for others in Kern Place as a gardener, earning 30 cents an hour.

Kern moved to Arlington, Texas in 1932, and started living in the Masonic Home for the Aged. His nickname in the home was "Klondike Pete." On February 8, 1937, Kern was killed in a collision with a Texas & Pacific passenger train in Arlington.

== See also ==
- Kern Place
- Western use of the swastika in the early 20th century § As a Native American symbol
