= Sun Metro =

Public transportation provider that serves El Paso, Texas

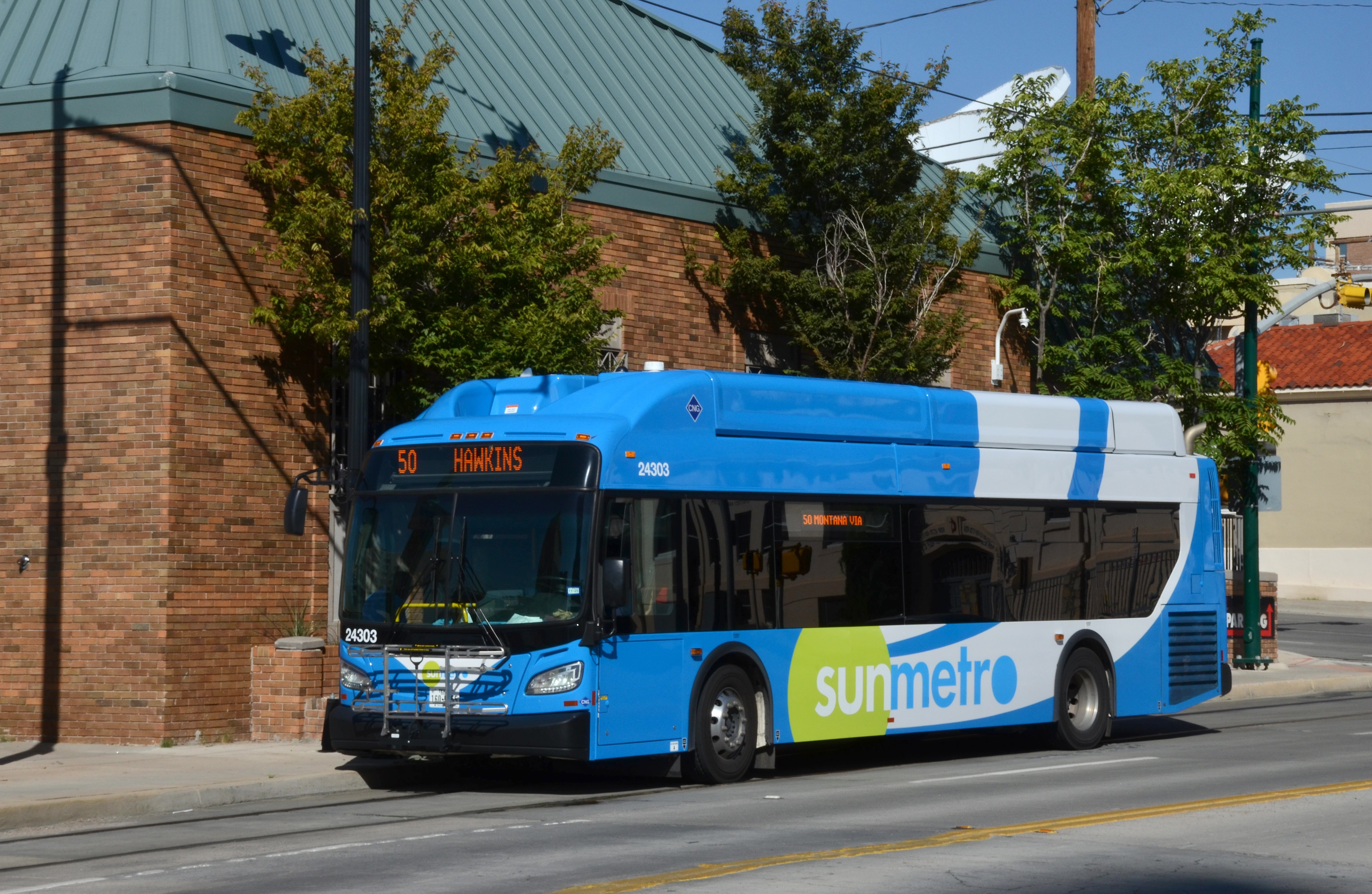
- A Sun Metro bus in 2025
- Parent: City of El Paso
- Founded: 1977
- Headquarters: 10151 Montana El Paso, Texas
- Locale: El Paso, Texas, US
- Service area: El Paso County
- Service type: bus, paratransit
- Alliance: Project Amistad, El Paso County Route Transit
- Routes: 39 As of 2026
- Stops: 1,800 As of 2026
- Hubs: 8
- Fleet: 171
- Daily ridership: 21,400 (weekdays, Q1 2026)
- Annual ridership: 6,186,400 (2025)
- Fuel type: Compressed natural gas
- Operator: City of El Paso
- Website: sunmetro.net

Sun Metro Mass Transit Department, simply known as Sun Metro, is the public transportation provider that serves El Paso, Texas. Consisting of buses and paratransit service, it is a department of the City of El Paso, and the agency also serves the rest of El Paso County. The major hub is located at the Bert Williams Downtown Santa Fe Transfer Center in the surrounding block areas in Downtown El Paso. In 2025, the system had a ridership of 6,186,400, or about 21,400 per weekday as of the first quarter of 2026.

== History ==
Until 1987, Sun Metro was called Sun City Area Transit (SCAT).

The agency was headquartered at the historic Union Depot in downtown El Paso until 2014, when it opened a new 37.5-acre (15.2 ha) facility along Montana Avenue southeast of El Paso International Airport.

== Services ==
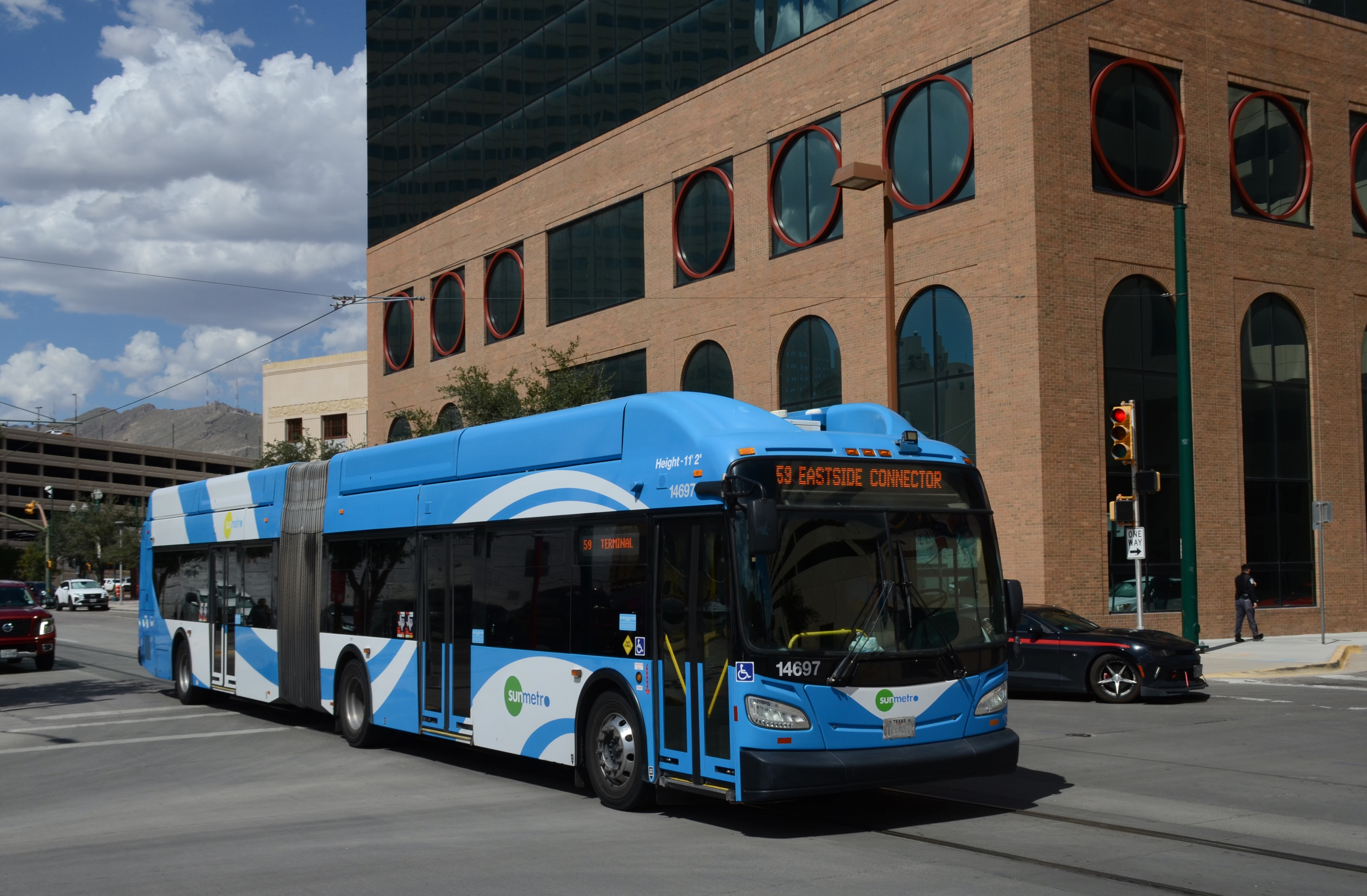
A Sun Metro articulated bus on route 59

=== Brio ===
Sun Metro began operating its express bus service, named Brio, on October 27, 2014, serving the Mesa Street corridor (part of State Highway 20) between Downtown El Paso and the Westside Transfer Center in Northwest El Paso. The frequency of Brio buses range from 10 minutes during weekday rush hours to 15 minutes mid-day from Monday to Friday, and 20 minutes on Saturdays; buses do not run on Sundays or holidays. The line uses 22 purpose-built curbside stations with shelters, ticket vending machines for pre-boarding payment, and real-time arrival information. The 8.6-mile-long (13.8 km) route runs in mixed traffic, but does use transit signal priority. The Brio fleet consists of 60-foot-long (18 m) branded New Flyer Xcelsior articulated buses powered by compressed natural gas, able to carry 72 total passengers and feature on-board WiFi, interior bike racks, and passenger information monitors. The project cost $27.1 million to implement, using local funds and a Federal Transit Administration grant.

Sun Metro opened its second Brio route, extending the system to Mission Valley via Alameda Avenue at a cost of $35.5 million. Further routes on Dyer Street and Montana Avenue are planned, with the former beginning construction as early as 2017.

=== El Paso Streetcar ===
The El Paso Streetcar is a streetcar system in El Paso, Texas, that opened for service on November 9, 2018, and uses a fleet of restored PCC streetcars that had served the city's previous system until its closure in 1974. The system covers 4.8 miles (7.7 km) (round trip) in two loops from Downtown El Paso to University of Texas at El Paso. The system was constructed under the authority of the Camino Real Regional Mobility Authority, but when the major construction was completed, around spring 2018, it was transferred to Sun Metro, for operation and maintenance. As of 2016, construction of the system was projected to cost $97 million.

== Fleet ==
=== Active ===
Make/ Model	length	Year	Numbers (Quantity Ordered)	Engine/ Transmission	Fuel Propulsion	Notes
NABI 40-LFW	40'	2007	0601-0635; 0680-0699 (55 buses)	Cummins ISL 8.9L; ZF Ecomat 2 6HP592C; Allison B400R6 Gen-IV	CNG	
NABI 40-LFW	40'	2008	0901-0940 (40 buses)	Cummins ISL 8.9L; Allison B400R6 Gen-IV	CNG	
NABI 35-LFW Gen-II	35'	2010	1001–1008 (8 buses)	Cummins ISL 8.9L; ZF Ecomat 4 6HP594C	CNG	
New Flyer XN60	60'	2014	14601-14610 (Brio) 14697-14699 (Fixed Route) (13 buses)	Cummins-Westport ISL-G 8.9L; ZF EcoLife 6AP1700B	CNG	Most of these buses are used in Sun Metro's BRIO BRT service.
New Flyer Xcelsior XN40	40'	2014	14401-14424 (24 buses)	Cummins-Westport ISL-G 8.9L; ZF EcoLife 6AP1400B	CNG	
New Flyer Xcelsior XN35	35'	2017	17301-17302 (2 buses)	Cummins-Westport L9N; ZF EcoLife 6AP1400B	CNG	
New Flyer XN60	60'	2018	18601-18622 (Brio) 18698-18699 (Fixed Route) (24 buses)	Cummins-Westport L9N; ZF EcoLife 6AP1700B	CNG	Most of these buses are used in Sun Metro's BRIO BRT service.
New Flyer XN60	60'	2020	20601-20614 (14 buses)	Cummins-Westport L9N; ZF EcoLife 6AP1720B	CNG	Used in Sun Metro's BRIO BRT service. 20602 and 20604 retired due to accident at maintenance facility in February 2025.
New Flyer Xcelsior XN35	35'	2022	21301-21306 (6 buses)	Cummins-Westport L9N; ZF EcoLife 6AP1420B	CNG	
New Flyer XN60	60'	2022	21601-21602 (2 buses)	Cummins-Westport L9N; ZF EcoLife 6AP1720B	CNG	Used in Sun Metro's BRIO BRT service.
New Flyer Xcelsior XN35	35'	2023	23301-23310 (10 buses)	Cummins-Westport L9N; ZF EcoLife 6AP1420B	CNG	
New Flyer XN60	60'	2023	23601-23602 (2 buses)	Cummins-Westport L9N; ZF EcoLife 6AP1720B??	CNG	
New Flyer Xcelsior XN35	35'	2024	24301-2420 (10 buses)	Cummins-Westport L9N; ZF EcoLife 6AP1420B??	CNG	

== Facilities ==
- Bert Williams Downtown Santa Fe Transfer Center (601 Santa Fe Street)
- Al Jefferson Westside Transfer Center (7535 Remcon Circle)
- Arturo Tury Benavides Cielo Vista Transit Center (1165 Sunmount Drive)
- Rorbert E. McKee Five Points Transit Center (2830 Montana Avenue)
- Transit Operations Center (10151 Montana Avenue)
- LIFT Facility (5081 Fred Wilson Avenue)
- Arves E. Jones Sr. Northgate Transit Center (9348 Dyer Street)
- Union Plaza Transit Terminal (400 West San Antonio Avenue)
- Nestor A. Valencia Mission Valley Transit Center (9065 Alameda Avenue)
- Glory Road Transit Center (100 East Glory Road)

== See also ==
- Streetcars in North America
