= El Paso Civic Center =

Civic center in El Paso, Texas

- Interactive map of El Paso Civic Center
- Address: 1 Civic Center Plaza
- Location: El Paso, Texas
- Coordinates: 31°45′27″N 106°29′31″W
- Owner: City of El Paso
- Operator: ASM Global
- Public transit: El Paso Streetcar at Convention Center

Construction
- Expanded: 2002

Website
- elpasolive.com

Judson F. Williams Convention Center, more commonly known as the El Paso Convention Center, is located on Santa Fe Street in downtown El Paso, Texas, adjacent to the Abraham Chavez Theatre. It was expanded in 2002 and now features 80,000 square feet (7,000 m^{2}) of columnless exhibit space (divided into three halls) with seating for up to 8,000 people. The convention center also has three lobbies totalling 38,300 square feet (3,560 m^{2}), including a 23,000-square-foot (2,100 m^{2}) main lobby, plus 14,900 square feet (1,380 m^{2}) of meeting space. Williams Convention Center's ceiling height is 28 feet (9 m); the center has excellent acoustics for many conventions and concerts held at the center. Trade shows and other special events also held at Williams Convention Center. The convention center is also home to the Sun Bowl Fan Fiesta.
