= 2022 Miami FC season =

Miami FC
2022 season
- Owner: Riccardo Silva
- CEO: Michael Williamson
- Head coach: Anthony Pulis
- Stadium: Riccardo Silva Stadium; Miami, Florida
- USL Championship: Eastern Conf.: 6th Overall: 9th
- Playoffs: Conference Quarterfinal
- U.S. Open Cup: Third Round
- Top goalscorer: League: Kyle Murphy (10); All: Kyle Murphy (11)
- Highest home attendance: League: 1,492 (Oct 1 vs. MEM); All: 11,158 (Apr 19 vs. IMCF)
- Lowest home attendance: League: 752 (July 13 vs. CHS); All: 527 (Apr 6 vs. MUFC)
- Average home league attendance: League: 1,144; All: 1,638
- Biggest win: NYR 1–7 MIA (September 9)
- Biggest defeat: PGH 4–1 MIA (July 9)

The 2022 Miami FC season was the club's third season in the USL Championship, the second-tier of American soccer, and eighth overall.

== Roster ==
As of October 22, 2022

Appearances and goals are career totals from all-competitions and leagues.

No.	Name	Nationality	Position	Date of birth (age)	Signed from	Signed in	Contract ends	Apps.	Goals
Goalkeepers
1	Jake McGuire	(United States)	GK	September 3, 1994 (age 32)	North Carolina FC	2022		12	0
24	Connor Sparrow	(United States)	GK	May 10, 1994 (age 32)	Chicago Fire FC	2021		56	0
31	Noah Abrams	(England)	GK	January 23, 1998 (age 28)	Loudoun United FC	2022		0	0
Defenders
3	Luca Antonelli	(Italy)	DF	February 11, 1987 (age 39)	(Italy) Empoli F.C.	2021		19	0
4	Callum Chapman-Page	(England)	DF	November 6, 1995 (age 30)	FC Tulsa	2021		62	6
5	Paco Craig	(England)	DF	October 19, 1992 (age 33)	(England) Wycombe Wanderers F.C.	2021		61	4
12	Aedan Stanley	(United States)	DF	December 13, 1999 (age 26)	Austin FC	2022		33	0
22	Benjamin Ofeimu	(United States)	DF	September 30, 2000 (age 25)	Birmingham Legion FC	2022	2022	19	0
96	Mark Segbers	(United States)	DF	April 18, 1996 (age 30)	Memphis 901 FC	2022		37	2
Midfielders
8	Dennis Dowouna	(Ghana)	MF	May 18, 2000 (age 26)	(Albania) KF Skënderbeu Korçë	2022	2023	8	0
10	Florian Valot	(France)	MF	February 12, 1993 (age 33)	FC Cincinnati	2022	2023	36	5
18	Junior Palacios	(Colombia)	MF	July 26, 1996 (age 30)	Boca Raton FC	2021	2023	45	1
21	Bolu Akinyode	(Nigeria)	MF	May 30, 1994 (age 32)	Birmingham Legion FC	2021		68	1
80	Devon Williams	(Jamaica)	MF	April 8, 1992 (age 34)	Louisville City FC	2021		56	3
Forwards
7	Joshua Pérez	(El Salvador)	FW	January 21, 1998 (age 28)	(Spain) UD Ibiza	2021		36	5
9	Kyle Murphy	(United States)	FW	December 11, 1992 (age 33)	Memphis 901 FC	2022		36	11
11	Richard Ballard	(United States)	FW	January 26, 1994 (age 32)	Unattached	2021		34	0
13	Lamar Walker	(Jamaica)	FW	December 5, 1999 (age 26)	(Jamaica) Portmore United F.C.	2021		49	7
14	Christian Sorto	(El Salvador)	FW	January 19, 2000 (age 26)	Rio Grande Valley FC	2022	2023	26	2
17	Joaquín Rivas	(El Salvador)	FW	April 26, 1992 (age 34)	FC Tulsa	2022		18	5
27	Romeo Parkes	(Jamaica)	FW	November 11, 1990 (age 35)	(Republic of Ireland) Sligo Rovers F.C.	2022		28	6
30	Adonijah Reid	(Canada)	FW	August 13, 1999 (age 27)	Unattached	2021		55	10
32	Claudio Repetto	(Italy)	FW	February 2, 1997 (age 29)	Phoenix Rising FC	2022		5	0
98	Pierre da Silva	(United States)	FW	July 28, 1998 (age 28)	Memphis 901 FC	2021		41	4

=== Staff ===
- (Wales) Anthony Pulis – Head coach
- (England) Max Rogers – Assistant coach
- (United States) Ryan Thamm – Head of Performance/Assistant coach
- (Italy) Giuseppe Weller – Goalkeeper coach
- (United States) Keeler Watson – Equipment manager

== Transfers ==
=== In ===
#	Pos.	Player	Signed from	Details	Date	Source
9	FW	(United States) Kyle Murphy	(United States) Memphis 901 FC	Free transfer	December 15, 2021	
96	DF	(United States) Mark Segbers	(United States) Memphis 901 FC	Free transfer	December 23, 2021	
14	FW	(El Salvador) Christian Sorto	(United States) Rio Grande Valley FC	Free transfer, two-year deal	December 28, 2021	
12	DF	(United States) Aedan Stanley	(United States) Austin FC	Free transfer	January 4, 2022	
8	MF	(Ghana) Dennis Dowouna	(Albania) KF Skënderbeu Korçë	Free transfer, two-year deal	January 12, 2022	
10	MF	(France) Florian Valot	(United States) FC Cincinnati	Free transfer, two-year deal	January 13, 2022	
22	DF	(United States) Ben Ofeimu	(United States) Birmingham Legion FC	Free transfer, one-year deal	January 25, 2022	
1	GK	(United States) Jake McGuire	(United States) North Carolina FC	Free transfer	January 26, 2022	
31	GK	(England) Noah Abrams	(United States) Loudoun United FC	Free transfer	January 31, 2022	
27	FW	(Jamaica) Romeo Parkes	(Republic of Ireland) Sligo Rovers F.C.	Free transfer	February 1, 2022	
17	FW	(El Salvador) Joaquín Rivas	(United States) FC Tulsa	Not disclosed, Sean McFarlane loaned to Tulsa for rest of season	June 22, 2022	
32	FW	(Italy) Claudio Repetto	(United States) Phoenix Rising FC	Not disclosed	September 21, 2022	

=== Out ===
#	Pos.	Player	Signed to	Details	Date	Source
14	MF	(United States) Robert Baggio Kcira	Unattached	Not re-signed	November 2021	
15	FW	(United States) Chris Cortez	(United States) Monterey Bay FC	Not re-signed	February 4, 2022	
9	FW	(Haiti) Christiano Francois	(United States) El Paso Locomotive FC	Not re-signed	February 8, 2022	
7	FW	(Turks and Caicos Islands) Billy Forbes	(United States) Detroit City FC	Not re-signed	March 2, 2022	
25	MF	(United States) Lance Rozeboom	(United States) Des Moines Menace	Not re-signed	March 23, 2022	
92	GK	(Haiti) Brian Sylvestre	Unattached	Not re-signed, retired	March 2022	
99	MF	(Jamaica) Jahshaun Anglin	(Jamaica) Harbour View F.C.	Not re-signed	April 1, 2022	
10	FW	(Cuba) Ariel Martínez	(United States) Hartford Athletic	Not re-signed	April 19, 2022	
19	DF	(Germany) János Löbe	(Germany) SV Eintracht Hohkeppel	Not re-signed	June 8, 2022	
2	DF	(Liberia) Othello Bah	Unattached	Retired	September 26, 2022	

=== Loan out ===
#	Pos.	Player	Loaned to	Details	Date	Source
31	GK	(England) Noah Abrams	(United States) Charlotte Independence	Short-term loan	June 3, 2022	
17	DF	(Jamaica) Sean McFarlane	(United States) FC Tulsa	Remainder of season	June 22, 2022	

== Friendlies ==
February 11 Preseason	Miami FC	1–2	CF Montréal	Fort Lauderdale, Florida
6:00 PM EST	Reid 80'	Report	30'; 51'	Stadium: Inter Miami CF Training Center

February 16 Preseason	Orlando City SC	0–0	Miami FC	Kissimmee, Florida
2:00 PM EST		Report		Stadium: Orlando Health Training Facility

February 20 Preseason	Orlando City B	2–5	Miami FC	Melbourne, Florida
12:00 PM EST	40'; 89'	Report	Reid 14', 25'; Walker 30', 50'; Pérez 84'	Stadium: Eastern Florida State College

February 20 Preseason	Montverde Academy	0–0	Miami FC	Melbourne, Florida
2:00 PM EST		Report		Stadium: Eastern Florida State College
Note: Two 30-minute halves

February 26 Preseason	Nova Southeastern Sharks	3–4	Miami FC	Davie, Florida
11:00 AM EST	15'; 63'; 74'	Report	Reid 40'; Walker 41'; Trialist 82'; Trialist 83'	Stadium: NSU Soccer Complex
Note: Three 30-minute periods

February 27 Preseason	Inter Miami CF II	v	Miami FC	Fort Lauderdale, Florida
11:00 AM EST		Report		Stadium: Inter Miami CF Training Center
Note: At the time of the schedule's announcement, the team was still known by its former name "Fort Lauderdale CF"

March 5 Preseason	FIU Panthers	0–1	Miami FC	University Park, Florida
7:00 PM EST		Report	Trialist 80'	Stadium: FIU Soccer Stadium

== Competitive ==
=== USL Championship ===
==== Standings — Eastern Conference ====
Pos	Team	Pld	W	L	T	GF	GA	GD	Pts	Qualification
1	Louisville City FC	34	22	6	6	65	28	+37	72	Qualification for the Conference Semifinals
2	Memphis 901 FC	34	21	8	5	67	33	+34	68	Playoffs
3	Tampa Bay Rowdies	34	20	7	7	73	33	+40	67	Playoffs
4	Birmingham Legion FC	34	17	10	7	56	37	+19	58	Playoffs
5	Pittsburgh Riverhounds SC	34	16	9	9	50	38	+12	57	Playoffs
6	Miami FC	34	15	9	10	47	32	+15	55	Playoffs
7	Detroit City FC	34	14	8	12	44	30	+14	54	Playoffs
8	FC Tulsa	34	12	16	6	48	58	−10	42	
9	Indy Eleven	34	12	17	5	41	55	−14	41	
10	Hartford Athletic	34	10	18	6	47	57	−10	36	
11	Loudoun United FC	34	8	22	4	36	74	−38	28	
12	Charleston Battery	34	6	21	7	41	77	−36	25	
13	Atlanta United 2	34	6	23	5	39	85	−46	23	
14	New York Red Bulls II	34	3	25	6	24	76	−52	15	

Source: USL Championship Standings

==== Results summary ====
Overall								Home						Away					
Pld	W	D	L	GF	GA	GD	Pts	W	D	L	GF	GA	GD	W	D	L	GF	GA	GD
34	15	10	9	47	32	+15	55	5	7	5	18	18	0	10	3	4	29	14	+15

Last updated: October 15, 2022.
Source: Match reports

==== Match results ====
March 12 1	Miami FC	2–0	New York Red Bulls II	Miami, Florida
7:00 PM EST	Pérez 11'; Parkes (yellow card) 67'; Segbers 73'	Report	Williams (yellow card) 47'; Murphy (yellow card) 64'	Stadium: Riccardo Silva Stadium; Attendance: 1,244; Referee: Gabriele Giusti

March 19 2	Louisville City FC	2–0	Miami FC	Louisville, Kentucky
7:30 PM EDT	Dia (yellow card) 18'; DelPiccolo (yellow card) 30', (goal) 36'; Gibson (yellow card) 45'; Harris (yellow card) 52'; Matsoso (yellow card) 70'; Ownby 74'; Bone (yellow card) 82'	Report	Pérez (yellow card) 10'; Palacios (yellow card) 14'; Williams (yellow card) 53'	Stadium: Lynn Family Stadium; Attendance: 8,846; Referee: Gerald Flores

March 26 3	Miami FC	0–0	Loudoun United FC	Miami, Florida
7:00 PM EDT	Bah (yellow card) 8'; Parkes (yellow card) 61'; Antonelli (yellow card) 66'	Report	Guediri (yellow card) 15' (yellow-red card) 83'; Downs (yellow card) 43'	Stadium: Riccardo Silva Stadium; Attendance: 1,174; Referee: Jalen Gray

April 2 4	Miami FC	1–2	Colorado Springs Switchbacks FC	Miami, Florida
7:00 PM EDT	Craig (yellow card) 15'; Parkes 77'	Report	Barry 4'; Zandi (yellow card) 45'; Ngalina 68'; Makangila (yellow card) 71'	Stadium: Riccardo Silva Stadium; Attendance: 1,083; Referee: Elvis Osmanovic

April 9 5	Tampa Bay Rowdies	0–1	Miami FC	St. Petersburg, Florida
7:30 PM EDT	Scarlett (yellow card) 54'; Etou (yellow card) 58'	Report	Craig (yellow card) 32'; Bah (yellow card) 49'; da Silva 51'; Segbers (yellow card) 65'	Stadium: Al Lang Stadium; Attendance: 4,947; Referee: Kevin Broadley

April 16 6	Miami FC	2–0	Hartford Athletic	Miami, Florida
7:00 PM EDT	Valot (yellow card) 10'; Murphy 16'; Parkes 87'	Report	Vassell (yellow card) 6'	Stadium: Riccardo Silva Stadium; Attendance: 1,102; Referee: Joshua Encarnación

April 23 7	Phoenix Rising FC	2–1	Miami FC	Chandler, Arizona
7:30 PM MST	Seijas (yellow card) 23', (goal) 88'; Lambert 45'; Madrid (yellow card) 90+5'	Report	Pérez 27'; Williams (yellow card) 40'	Stadium: Phoenix Rising Soccer Complex at Wild Horse Pass; Attendance: 6,785; Referee: Melvin Rivas

April 30 8	Memphis 901 FC	1–2	Miami FC	Memphis, Tennessee
7:00 PM CDT	Seagrist (yellow card) 41'; Kizza (yellow card) 52'; Molloy (yellow card) 57'; Kissiedou 76'	Report	Murphy 7'; da Silva 11'; Akinyode (yellow card) 90+2'	Stadium: AutoZone Park; Attendance: 3,706; Referee: John Griggs

May 4 9	Birmingham Legion FC	0–0	Miami FC	Birmingham, Alabama
7:00 PM CDT	Lopez (yellow card) 29'; Kasim (yellow card) 47'	Report	Craig (yellow card) 31'; Akinyode (yellow card) 42'	Stadium: Protective Stadium; Referee: Adam Kilpatrick

May 14 10	Miami FC	0–2	San Antonio FC	Miami, Florida
7:00 PM EDT	Murphy (yellow card) 36'; Antonelli (yellow card) 61'; Ofeimu (yellow card) 90+4'	Report	Khmiri (yellow card) 39'; Beckford 41', (yellow card) 51'; Diouf (yellow card) 63'; Taintor (yellow card) 68', (goal) 90+5' (pen.); PC (yellow card) 77'	Stadium: Riccardo Silva Stadium; Attendance: 1,307; Referee: Gerald Flores

May 18 11	Miami FC	1–1	Detroit City FC	Miami, Florida
7:00 PM EDT	Stanley (yellow card) 82'; Sparrow (yellow card) 84'; Reid (yellow card) 88', (goal) 90+5'; McFarlane (yellow card) 89'	Report	Hoppenot 22'; Williams (yellow card) 80'; Rodriguez (yellow card) 85'	Stadium: Riccardo Silva Stadium; Attendance: 853; Referee: Alejo Calume

May 21 12	Charleston Battery	0–4	Miami FC	Mount Pleasant, South Carolina
7:00 PM EDT	Harmon (yellow card) 34' (yellow-red card) 54'	Report	Bah 5', 32'; Valot 16'; Parkes 50'	Stadium: Patriots Point Soccer Complex; Attendance: 3,380; Referee: Izlen Peksenar

May 28 13	Miami FC	2–2	Pittsburgh Riverhounds SC	Miami, Florida
7:00 PM EDT	Williams (yellow card) 16'; Palacios 24'; Reid 45+2', (yellow card) 62'; Murphy (yellow card) 90+1'	Report	Dixon (penalty missed) 17', 54'; Cicerone 38'; Griffin (yellow card) 41'; Argudo (yellow card) 67'; Dossantos (yellow card) 70'	Stadium: Riccardo Silva Stadium; Attendance: 937; Referee: Alejo Calume

June 4 14	FC Tulsa	0–0	Miami FC	Tulsa, Oklahoma
7:30 PM CDT	Diz (yellow card) 19'; Bird (yellow card) 50'; Kibato (yellow card) 53'	Report	Chapman-Page (yellow card) 82'; Sorto (yellow card) 90+4'	Stadium: ONEOK Field; Attendance: 3,506; Referee: DeShun Beard

June 8 15	Miami FC	1–1	Indy Eleven	Miami, Florida
7:00 PM EDT	Sorto 15'; Walker (yellow card) 36'; Chapman-Page (yellow card) 40'; Valot (yellow card) 60'; Parkes (yellow card) 90+2'	Report	Arteaga (yellow card) 22'; Aguilera (yellow card) 38'; Pinho 55'	Stadium: Riccardo Silva Stadium; Attendance: 850; Referee: John Matto

June 11 16	Miami FC	1–2	Tampa Bay Rowdies	Miami, Florida
7:00 PM EDT	Chapman-Page (yellow card) 19'; Valot (yellow card) 23'; Bah (yellow card) 47', (goal) 65'	Report	Scarlett (yellow card) 3'; Akinyode 33' (o.g.); Ekra (yellow card) 38'; Fernandes 48' (pen.); Etou (yellow card) 87'; Guillén (yellow card) 88'	Stadium: Riccardo Silva Stadium; Attendance: 1,382; Referee: Elvis Osmanovic

June 25 17	Miami FC	1–3	LA Galaxy II	Miami, Florida
7:00 PM EDT	Craig (yellow card) 5'; Murphy 17'; Segbers (yellow card) 44'; Chapman-Page (yellow card) 84'	Report	Drack 6'; Salazar 9'; Cabral (yellow card) 23'; Harvey (yellow card) 53'; Judd 70'; Picazo (yellow card) 76'; Doyle (yellow card) 90+4'	Stadium: Riccardo Silva Stadium; Attendance: 1,254; Referee: Eric Tattersall

July 2 18	Indy Eleven	0–1	Miami FC	Indianapolis, Indiana
7:30 PM EDT	Law (yellow card) 12'; Arteaga (yellow card) 28' (yellow-red card) 90+4'; Brown (yellow card) 46'	Report	Pérez (yellow card) 24', (goal) 58'; Chapman-Page (yellow card) 28'; Stanley (yellow card) 38'; Walker (yellow card) 41'	Stadium: Carroll Stadium; Attendance: 8,008; Referee: Nabil Bensalah

July 9 19	Pittsburgh Riverhounds SC	4–1	Miami FC	Pittsburgh, Pennsylvania
7:00 PM EDT	Cicerone 14'; Kelly-Rosales (yellow card) 27'; Sims (yellow card) 35'; Peters 49', 61'; Wiedt 69'; Dossantos (yellow card) 82'	Report	Chapman-Page 90+2'	Stadium: Highmark Stadium; Attendance: 4,703; Referee: Gerald Flores
Note: Match report erroneously lists Adonijah Reid as number 21 and as a starter. Miami FC social media lists Bolu Akinyode as #21, correctly, and as a starter, both in the lineup graphic and pictured (3rd from the right, back row). This is also confirmed in the broadcast itself. As such, Akinyode has been given the cap on this page.

July 13 20	Miami FC	1–0	Charleston Battery	Miami, Florida
7:00 PM EDT	Parkes 4'; Walker (yellow card) 71'; Williams (yellow card) 73'; Akinyode (yellow card) 90+4'; Ballard (yellow card) 90+5'	Report	Kwakwa (yellow card) 43'	Stadium: Riccardo Silva Stadium; Attendance: 752; Referee: Natalie Simon

July 16 21	Orange County SC	0–0	Miami FC	Irvine, California
5:00 PM (PDT)	Powers (yellow card) 20'; Hoffman (yellow card) 48'; Iloski (yellow card) 90+3'	Report	Segbers (yellow card) 53'; Williams (yellow card) 86'; Sorto (yellow card) 90+5'	Stadium: Championship Soccer Stadium; Attendance: 3,869; Referee: Brandon Stevis

July 23 22	Loudoun United FC	1–2	Miami FC	Leesburg, Virginia
7:30 PM EDT	Zanne 13'; Diarra (yellow card) 60'; Freeman (yellow card) 70'; Downs (yellow card) 90'	Report	Valot 34'; Murphy (yellow card) 40'; Akinyode (yellow card) 59'; Craig 90+2'; Ballard (yellow card) 90+4'	Stadium: Segra Field; Attendance: 1,289; Referee: Austin Saini

August 6 23	New Mexico United	0–3	Miami FC	Albuquerque, New Mexico
7:00 PM MDT	Williams (yellow card) 43'; Seymore (yellow card) 45+1'; Suggs (yellow card) 74'; Swartz (yellow card) 90+3'	Report	Murphy 45+3', 49'; Palacios (yellow card) 65'; Parkes 79'; Rivas (yellow card) 90+1'; Walker (yellow card) 90+6'	Stadium: Isotopes Park; Attendance: 11,024; Referee: Brad Jensen

August 10 24	Miami FC	1–2	FC Tulsa	Miami, Florida
7:00 PM EDT	Craig 25'; Rivas (yellow card) 87'	Report	Diz (yellow card) 24'; Suárez 27'; Powder 40', (yellow card) 59'	Stadium: Riccardo Silva Stadium; Attendance: 1,464; Referee: Adam Kilpatrick

August 13 25	Atlanta United 2	0–2	Miami FC	Kennesaw, Georgia
7:30 PM EDT	Cobb (red card) 31'; Morales (yellow card) 35'; Fortune (yellow card) 41'; Ambrose (yellow card) 75'	Report	Segbers 8', (yellow card) 48'; Chapman-Page (yellow card) 12'; Akinyode (yellow card) 77'; Valot 90+3'	Stadium: Fifth Third Bank Stadium; Attendance: 547; Referee: Gabriele Giusti

August 20 26	Hartford Athletic	0–2	Miami FC	Hartford, Connecticut
7:00 PM EDT	Prince Saydee (yellow card) 47'; Ashkanov Apollon (yellow card) 79'	Report	Connor Sparrow (yellow card) 11'; Murphy 45+3' (pen.); Valot 62'; Akinyode (yellow card) 75'	Stadium: Trinity Health Stadium; Attendance: 5,500; Referee: Calin Radosav

August 27 27	Miami FC	1–0	Louisville City FC	Miami, Florida
7:00 PM EDT	Murphy 4'; Craig (yellow card) 82'	Report	DelPiccolo (yellow card) 31'	Stadium: Riccardo Silva Stadium; Attendance: 1,263; Referee: Elton García

September 3 28	Miami FC	1–1	Birmingham Legion FC	Miami, Florida
7:00 PM EDT	Chapman-Page (yellow card) 17'; Walker 32'; Valot (yellow card) 43'; Stanley (yellow card) 79'	Report	Martínez (yellow card) 6'; Agudelo (penalty missed) 17'; Lapa 69'; Lopez (yellow card) 90+5'	Stadium: Riccardo Silva Stadium; Attendance: 953; Referee: Elijio Arreguin

September 9 29	New York Red Bulls II	1–7	Miami FC	Montclair, New Jersey
7:00 PM EDT	Knapp (yellow card) 4' (yellow-red card) 49'; Adebayo-Smith 10'; Ruiz (yellow card) 42'; Salinas (yellow card) 44'	Report	Rivas 19', 26'; Murphy 31', 45' (pen.); Dowouna (yellow card) 32'; Nocita 45+3' (o.g.); Valot (yellow card) 62'; Sorto 72'; Pérez (yellow card) 82', (goal) 84'; Palacios (yellow card) 90+1'	Stadium: MSU Soccer Park; Attendance: 794; Referee: Matthew Corrigan

September 17 30	Miami FC	2–2	Atlanta United 2	Miami, Florida
7:00 PM EDT	Akinyode (yellow card) 44'; Chapman-Page 45+1'; Murphy 70'	Report	Matheus 57'; Firmino (yellow card) 67'; Pérez 81' (o.g.); Carleton (yellow card) 89'	Stadium: Riccardo Silva Stadium; Attendance: 1,317; Referee: Austin Saini

September 24 31	Miami FC	0–0	Monterey Bay FC	Miami, Florida
7:00 PM EDT	Segbers (yellow card) 11'; Sorto (yellow card) 46'	Report	Martinez (yellow card) 16'; Robinson (yellow card) 41'; Gorskie (yellow card) 86'	Stadium: Riccardo Silva Stadium; Attendance: 1,019; Referee: Jeremy Scheer

October 1 32	Miami FC	1–0	Memphis 901 FC	Miami, Florida
7:00 PM EDT	Murphy (yellow card) 41'; Reid 90+1'	Report	Seagrist (yellow card) 18'; Pickering (yellow card) 23'; Paul (yellow card) 57'	Stadium: Riccardo Silva Stadium; Attendance: 1,492; Referee: Elvis Osmanovic

October 8 33	Las Vegas Lights FC	3–2	Miami FC	Las Vegas, Nevada
7:00 PM PDT	Antonelli 31' (o.g.); Crisostomo (yellow card) 40', (goal) 66'; Jennings 78'. (yellow card) 85'	Report	Pérez (yellow card) 29'; Rivas 69'; Valot 84'; Segbers (yellow card) 90'	Stadium: Cashman Field; Referee: Elton García

October 15 34	Detroit City FC	0–1	Miami FC	Hamtramck, Michigan
4:00 PM EDT	Williams (yellow card) 69'	Report	Rivas 45+1'; Chapman-Page (yellow card) 80'; Segbers (yellow card) 81'; Repetto (yellow card) 89'	Stadium: Keyworth Stadium; Attendance: 7,537; Referee: Luis Guardia

=== USL Championship Playoffs ===
October 22 Conference Quarterfinals	Tampa Bay Rowdies	3–1	Miami FC	St. Petersburg, Florida
7:30 PM EDT	Antley (yellow card) 30'; Guenzatti 50', 70'; Law 59'	Report	Chapman-Page (yellow card) 39'; Rivas 55'; Ballard (yellow card) 84'	Stadium: Al Lang Stadium; Attendance: 5,937; Referee: Calin Radosav

=== U.S. Open Cup ===
As a USL Championship club, Miami FC entered competition in the Second Round, played between April 5–7.

April 6 Second Round	(Florida) Miami FC	3–0	(Florida) Miami United FC	University Park, Florida
7:00 PM EDT	Murphy 12' (pen.); Reid 30'; Stanley (yellow card) 36'; Ofeimu (yellow card) 44'; Dowouna (yellow card) 68'; Parkes 82'; da Silva (yellow card) 72'	Soccerway Report; ESPN Report	Dominguez (yellow card) 18'; Casavilla (yellow card) 76'	Stadium: FIU Soccer Stadium; Attendance: 527; Referee: Anya Voigt

April 19 Third Round	(Florida) Miami FC	0–1	(Florida) Inter Miami CF	University Park, Florida
7:00 PM EDT	da Silva (yellow card) 85'; Ofeimu (yellow card) 90+3'	Soccerway Report; ESPN Report	Quinteros (yellow card) 42'; Adams (yellow card) 44'; Gregore (yellow card) 45+3'; Lowe (yellow card) 45+3' (yellow-red card) 90+4'; Campana 83'	Stadium: Riccardo Silva Stadium; Attendance: 11,158; Referee: Alex Billeter

== Squad statistics ==
As of Match played October 22, 2022

=== Appearances and goals ===
No.	Pos	Nat	Player	Total		Regular Season		Open Cup		Playoffs	
No.	Pos	Nat	Player	Apps	Goals	Apps	Goals	Apps	Goals	Apps	Goals
Goalkeepers
1	GK	(United States) USA	Jake McGuire	12	0	11+0	0	0+0	0	1+0	0
24	GK	(United States) USA	Connor Sparrow	25	0	23+0	0	2+0	0	0+0	0
31	GK	(England) ENG	Noah Abrams	0	0	0+0	0	0+0	0	0+0	0
Defenders
3	DF	(Italy) ITA	Luca Antonelli	8	0	8+0	0	0+0	0	0+0	0
4	DF	(England) ENG	Callum Chapman-Page	20	2	16+2	2	0+1	0	1+0	0
5	DF	(England) ENG	Paco Craig	28	2	25+1	2	1+0	0	1+0	0
12	DF	(United States) USA	Aedan Stanley	33	0	28+2	0	2+0	0	1+0	0
22	DF	(United States) USA	Ben Ofeimu	19	0	15+2	0	2+0	0	0+0	0
96	DF	(United States) USA	Mark Segbers	37	2	32+2	2	2+0	0	1+0	0
Midfielders
8	MF	(Ghana) GHA	Dennis Dowouna	8	0	2+5	0	0+1	0	0+0	0
10	MF	(France) FRA	Florian Valot	36	5	29+4	5	2+0	0	1+0	0
18	MF	(Colombia) COL	Junior Palacios	18	1	7+10	1	1+0	0	0+0	0
21	MF	(Nigeria) NGR	Bolu Akinyode	36	0	29+4	0	2+0	0	1+0	0
80	MF	(Jamaica) JAM	Devon Williams	31	0	28+0	0	2+0	0	1+0	0
Forwards
7	FW	(El Salvador) ESA	Joshua Pérez	29	4	24+3	4	1+0	0	1+0	0
9	FW	(United States) USA	Kyle Murphy	36	11	25+8	10	2+0	1	1+0	0
11	FW	(United States) USA	Richard Ballard	12	0	4+7	0	0+0	0	0+1	0
13	FW	(Jamaica) JAM	Lamar Walker	24	1	10+12	1	1+1	0	0+0	0
14	FW	(El Salvador) ESA	Christian Sorto	26	2	11+15	2	0+0	0	0+0	0
17	FW	(El Salvador) ESA	Joaquín Rivas	18	5	13+4	4	0+0	0	1+0	1
27	FW	(Jamaica) JAM	Romeo Parkes	28	6	12+14	5	0+2	1	0+0	0
30	FW	(Canada) CAN	Adonijah Reid	25	4	3+19	3	1+1	1	0+1	0
32	FW	(Italy) ITA	Claudio Repetto	5	0	0+4	0	0+0	0	0+1	0
98	FW	(United States) USA	Pierre da Silva	15	2	7+6	2	1+1	0	0+0	0
Left during season
2	DF	(Liberia) LBR	Othello Bah	16	3	10+5	3	0+1	0	0+0	0
17	DF	(Jamaica) JAM	Sean McFarlane	5	0	2+3	0	0+0	0	0+0	0

=== Goal scorers ===
Place	Position	Nation	Number	Name	Regular Season	Open Cup	Playoffs	Total
1	FW	(United States)	9	Kyle Murphy	10	1	0	11
2	FW	(Jamaica)	27	Romeo Parkes	5	1	0	6
3	MF	(France)	10	Florian Valot	5	0	0	5
3	FW	(El Salvador)	17	Joaquín Rivas	4	0	1	5
5	FW	(El Salvador)	7	Joshua Pérez	4	0	0	4
5	FW	(Canada)	30	Adonijah Reid	3	1	0	4
7	DF	(Liberia)	2	Othello Bah	3	0	0	3
8	DF	(England)	4	Callum Chapman-Page	2	0	0	2
8	MF	(England)	5	Paco Craig	2	0	0	2
8	FW	(El Salvador)	14	Christian Sorto	2	0	0	2
8	DF	(United States)	96	Mark Segbers	2	0	0	2
8	FW	(United States)	98	Pierre da Silva	2	0	0	2
13	FW	(Jamaica)	13	Lamar Walker	1	0	0	1
13	MF	(Colombia)	18	Junior Palacios	1	0	0	1
13				Own goal	1	0	0	1

=== Disciplinary record ===
Number	Nation	Position	Name	Regular Season		Open Cup		Playoffs		Total	
Number	Nation	Position	Name	Booked	Sent off (straight red)	Booked	Sent off (straight red)	Booked	Sent off (straight red)	Booked	Sent off (straight red)
2	(Liberia)	DF	Othello Bah	3	0	0	0	0	0	3	0
3	(Italy)	DF	Luca Antonelli	2	0	0	0	0	0	2	0
4	(England)	DF	Callum Chapman-Page	8	0	0	0	1	0	9	0
5	(England)	DF	Paco Craig	5	0	0	0	0	0	5	0
7	(El Salvador)	FW	Joshua Pérez	4	0	0	0	0	0	4	0
8	(Ghana)	MF	Dennis Dowouna	1	0	1	0	0	0	2	0
9	(United States)	FW	Kyle Murphy	4	0	0	0	0	0	4	0
10	(France)	MF	Florian Valot	5	0	0	0	0	0	5	0
11	(United States)	FW	Richard Ballard	2	0	0	0	1	0	3	0
12	(United States)	DF	Aedan Stanley	3	0	1	0	0	0	4	0
13	(Jamaica)	FW	Lamar Walker	4	0	0	0	0	0	4	0
14	(El Salvador)	FW	Christian Sorto	3	0	0	0	0	0	3	0
17	(Jamaica)	DF	Sean McFarlane	1	0	0	0	0	0	1	0
17	(El Salvador)	FW	Joaquín Rivas	2	0	0	0	0	0	2	0
18	(Colombia)	MF	Junior Palacios	3	0	0	0	0	0	3	0
21	(Nigeria)	MF	Bolu Akinyode	7	0	0	0	0	0	7	0
22	(United States)	DF	Ben Ofeimu	1	0	2	0	0	0	3	0
24	(United States)	GK	Connor Sparrow	2	0	0	0	0	0	2	0
27	(Jamaica)	FW	Romeo Parkes	3	0	0	0	0	0	3	0
30	(Canada)	FW	Adonijah Reid	2	0	0	0	0	0	2	0
32	(Italy)	FW	Claudio Repetto	1	0	0	0	0	0	1	0
80	(Jamaica)	MF	Devon Williams	5	0	0	0	0	0	5	0
96	(United States)	DF	Mark Segbers	7	0	0	0	0	0	7	0
98	(United States)	FW	Pierre da Silva	0	0	2	0	0	0	2	0

== Notes ==
1. ^{A} Despite officially being a loan, Miami FC has indicated Sean McFarlane will not be returning to the team once the season comes to an end. With new addition Joaquín Rivas also taking McFarlane's number 17 jersey, McFarlane will be categorized as departed from the team.
