= 2021 Miami FC season =

Miami FC
2021 season
- Owner: Riccardo Silva
- President: Paul Dalglish
- Head coach: Paul Dalglish
- Stadium: Riccardo Silva Stadium; Miami, Florida
- USL Championship: Atlantic Div.: 4th Eastern Conf.: 6th Overall: 8th
- Playoffs: Conf. Quarterfinals
- U.S. Open Cup: Cancelled
- Top goalscorer: Christiano François (11)
- Highest home attendance: 1,083 (Oct 16 vs. PGH)
- Lowest home attendance: 418 (Sep 25 vs. LDN)
- Average home league attendance: 699
- Biggest win: MIA 6–1 LDN (Sept. 25)
- Biggest defeat: TBR 3–0 MIA (Oct. 20)

The 2021 Miami FC season was the club's second season in the USL Championship, the second-tier of American soccer, and seventh overall.

== Roster ==
As of November 6, 2021

Appearances and goals are career totals from all-competitions and leagues.

No.	Name	Nationality	Position	Date of birth (age)	Signed from	Signed in	Contract ends	Apps.	Goals
Goalkeepers
24	Connor Sparrow	(United States)	GK	May 10, 1994 (age 32)	Chicago Fire FC	2021		31	0
49	Jeff Caldwell	(United States)	GK	February 20, 1996 (age 30)	loan from Hartford Athletic	2021	2021	1	0
92	Brian Sylvestre	(Haiti)	GK	December 19, 1992 (age 33)	Forward Madison FC	2020		4	0
Defenders
2	Othello Bah	(Liberia)	DF	April 27, 1997 (age 29)	Unattached	2019		52	5
3	Luca Antonelli	(Italy)	DF	February 11, 1987 (age 39)	(Italy) Empoli F.C.	2021		11	0
4	Callum Chapman-Page	(England)	DF	November 6, 1995 (age 31)	FC Tulsa	2021		42	4
5	Paco Craig	(England)	DF	October 19, 1992 (age 34)	(England) Wycombe Wanderers F.C.	2021		33	2
17	Sean McFarlane	(Jamaica)	DF	April 4, 1993 (age 33)	Austin Bold FC	2021		41	4
19	János Löbe	(Germany)	DF	August 21, 1995 (age 31)	New York Red Bulls II	2020		44	0
Midfielders
14	Robert Baggio Kcira	(United States)	MF	January 9, 1994 (age 32)	Unattached	2021		42	2
18	Junior Palacios	(Colombia)	MF	July 26, 1996 (age 30)	Boca Raton FC	2021	2022	27	0
25	Lance Rozeboom	(United States)	MF	May 31, 1989 (age 37)	Tampa Bay Rowdies	2019		40	0
30	Bolu Akinyode	(Nigeria)	MF	May 30, 1994 (age 32)	Birmingham Legion FC	2021		32	1
80	Devon Williams	(Jamaica)	MF	April 8, 1992 (age 34)	Louisville City FC	2021		25	3
99	Jahshaun Anglin	(Jamaica)	MF	May 6, 2001 (age 25)	(Jamaica) Harbour View F.C.	2021		15	0
Forwards
7	Billy Forbes	(Turks and Caicos Islands)	FW	December 13, 1990 (age 35)	Austin Bold FC	2021		26	7
8	Joshua Pérez	(El Salvador)	FW	January 21, 1998 (age 28)	(Spain) UD Ibiza	2021		7	1
9	Christiano François	(Haiti)	FW	July 17, 1993 (age 33)	Reno 1868 FC	2021		32	11
10	Ariel Martínez	(Cuba)	FW	June 9, 1986 (age 40)	FC Tulsa	2021		122	31
11	Richard Ballard	(United States)	FW	January 26, 1994 (age 32)	Unattached	2021		22	0
13	Lamar Walker	(Jamaica)	FW	December 5, 1999 (age 26)	(Jamaica) Portmore United F.C.	2021		25	6
15	Chris Cortez	(United States)	FW	July 24, 1988 (age 38)	(Czech Republic) 1. FK Příbram	2021	2021	5	1
21	Adonijah Reid	(Canada)	FW	August 13, 1999 (age 27)	Unattached	2021		30	6
98	Pierre da Silva	(United States)	FW	July 28, 1998 (age 28)	Memphis 901 FC	2021		26	2

=== Staff ===
- (Scotland) Paul Dalglish – Head coach
- (Wales) Jed Davies – Assistant coach
- (Scotland) Andy Thomson – Assistant coach

== Transfers ==
=== In ===
#	Pos.	Player	Signed from	Details	Date	Source
25	MF	(United States) Lance Rozeboom	(United States) Miami FC	Re-signed	January 5, 2021	
92	GK	(Haiti) Brian Sylvestre	(United States) Miami FC	Re-signed	January 5, 2021	
2	DF	(Liberia) Othello Bah	(United States) Miami FC	Re-signed	January 5, 2021	
19	DF	(Germany) János Löbe	(United States) Miami FC	Re-signed	January 5, 2021	
18	MF	(Colombia) Junior Palacios	(United States) Boca Raton FC	Signed following trial	January 5, 2021	
17	DF	(Jamaica) Sean McFarlane	(United States) Austin Bold FC	Multiyear contract	January 6, 2021	
76	DF	(Mexico) Ramón Martín del Campo	(United States) OKC Energy FC	Free transfer	January 7, 2021	
80	MF	(Jamaica) Devon Williams	(United States) Louisville City FC	Free transfer	January 8, 2021	
7	FW	(Turks and Caicos Islands) Billy Forbes	(United States) Austin Bold FC	Free transfer	January 11, 2021	
4	DF	(England) Callum Chapman-Page	(United States) FC Tulsa	Free transfer	January 12, 2021	
5	DF	(England) Paco Craig	(England) Wycombe Wanderers F.C.	Free transfer	January 13, 2021	
98	FW	(United States) Pierre da Silva	(United States) Memphis 901 FC	Free transfer	January 14, 2021	
11	FW	(United States) Richard Ballard	Unattached	Free transfer	January 14, 2021	
30	MF	(Nigeria) Bolu Akinyode	(United States) Birmingham Legion FC	Undisclosed fee	January 15, 2021	
9	FW	(Haiti) Christiano François	(United States) Reno 1868 FC	Free transfer	January 18, 2021	
10	FW	(Cuba) Ariel Martínez	(United States) FC Tulsa	Free transfer	January 19, 2021	
24	GK	(United States) Connor Sparrow	(United States) Chicago Fire FC	Free transfer	January 21, 2021	
21	FW	(Canada) Adonijah Reid	Unattached	Free transfer	January 22, 2021	
13	FW	(Jamaica) Lamar Walker	(Jamaica) Portmore United F.C.	Free transfer	January 29, 2021	
99	MF	(Jamaica) Jahshaun Anglin	(Jamaica) Harbour View F.C.	Free transfer	January 29, 2021	
3	DF	(Italy) Luca Antonelli	(Italy) Empoli F.C.	Free transfer	February 17, 2021	
14	MF	(United States) Robert Baggio Kcira	Unattached	Free transfer	June 6, 2021	
8	FW	(El Salvador) Joshua Pérez	(Spain) UD Ibiza	Free transfer	August 26, 2021	
15	FW	(United States) Chris Cortez	(Czech Republic) 1. FK Příbram	Free transfer	September 17, 2021	

=== Out ===
#	Pos.	Player	Signed to	Details	Date	Source
4	DF	(Cameroon) Hassan Ndam	(United States) FC Cincinnati	Loan ended	October 11, 2020	
1	GK	(United States) Mark Pais	Unattached	Not re-signed	December 2020	
3	DF	(United States) Marco Franco	Unattached	Not re-signed	December 2020	
6	MF	(England) Harrison Heath	Unattached	Not re-signed	December 2020	
12	FW	(Mexico) Miguel González	Unattached	Not re-signed	December 2020	
13	DF	(Kenya) Lawrence Olum	Unattached	Not re-signed	December 2020	
14	FW	(Ghana) Lloyd Sam	Unattached	Not re-signed	December 2020	
17	MF	(United States) Brian James	Unattached	Not re-signed	December 2020	
21	MF	(Cuba) Héctor Morales	Unattached	Not re-signed	December 2020	
22	GK	(United States) Bryant Gammiero	Unattached	Not re-signed	December 2020	
23	DF	(Jamaica) Brenton Griffiths	Unattached	Not re-signed	December 2020	
45	DF	(United States) Jalen Markey	Unattached	Not re-signed	December 2020	
10	MF	(Colombia) Sebastián Velásquez	(Israel) Bnei Sakhnin F.C.	Not re-signed	October 18, 2020	
9	FW	(Jamaica) Romario Williams	(Egypt) Al Ittihad Alexandria Club	Not re-signed	December 5, 2020	
11	MF	(Colombia) Prince Saydee	(United States) Phoenix Rising FC	Not re-signed	January 4, 2021	
8	MF	(El Salvador) Tomás Granitto	(El Salvador) C.D. FAS	Not re-signed	February 5, 2021	
7	MF	(France) Vincent Bezecourt	(Armenia) FC Alashkert	Not re-signed	March 9, 2021	
28	FW	(Senegal) Mohamed Thiaw	(United States) Metro Louisville FC (PASL)	Not re-signed	March 2021	
76	DF	(Mexico) Ramón Martín del Campo	Unattached	Retired	May 22, 2021	

=== Loan in ===
#	Pos.	Player	Loaned from	Details	Date	Source
1	GK	(United States) Luis Zamudio	(United States) Fort Lauderdale CF	Season-long, recalled on July 30	July 7, 2021	
49	GK	(United States) Jeff Caldwell	(United States) Hartford Athletic	Emergency loan, ended on Nov 7	November 5, 2021	

== Friendlies ==
March 13, 2021 Preseason	Naples United FC	0–1	Miami FC	Naples, Florida
6:00 p.m. EST		Report	Craig 25'	Stadium: Paradise Coast Sports Complex; Attendance: 0
Note: Played behind closed doors, match divided into three 15 minute periods

March 20, 2021 Preseason	Inter Miami CF	P–P	Miami FC	Fort Lauderdale, Florida
TBD		Report		Stadium: Inter Miami CF Stadium
Note: Postponed due positive COVID-19 testing

March 27, 2021 Preseason	New York Red Bulls	0–2	Miami FC	Bradenton, Florida
2:00 p.m. EST		Report	Williams 27'; Reid 32'	Stadium: IMG Academy
Note: Match composed of two 30 minute halves

April 1, 2021 Preseason	Fort Lauderdale CF	P–P	Miami FC	Fort Lauderdale, Florida
7:30 pm		Report		Stadium: Inter Miami CF Training Center
Note: Postponed due positive COVID-19 testing

April 6, 2021 Preseason	Orlando City SC	v	Miami FC	Kissimmee, Florida
TBD		Highlight		Stadium: Orlando City SC Training Facility
Note: Closed-door scrimmage

April 7, 2021 Preseason	Inter Miami CF	v	Miami FC	Fort Lauderdale, Florida
TBD		Report		Stadium: Inter Miami CF Training Center
Note: Closed-door scrimmage

April 11, 2021 Preseason	Inter Miami CF	P–P	Miami FC	Fort Lauderdale, Florida
TBD		Report		Stadium: Inter Miami CF Training Center
Note: Cancelled due to scheduling conflicts

April 19, 2021 Preseason	Inter Miami CF	v	Miami FC	Fort Lauderdale, Florida
TBD		Report		Stadium: DRV PNK Stadium
Note: Closed-door friendly, results not published

April 25, 2021 Preseason	Miami FC	v	Miami FC U-19	University Park, Florida
5:00 p.m. EST		Report		Stadium: FIU Soccer Stadium
Note: Closed-door friendly, results not published

April 25, 2021 Preseason	Miami FC	1–0	FC Miami City	University Park, Florida
7:30 p.m. EST	McFarlane	Report		Stadium: FIU Soccer Stadium
Note: Closed-door friendly

== Competitive ==
=== USL Championship ===
==== Standings — Atlantic Division ====
Pos	Team	Pld	W	L	T	GF	GA	GD	Pts	Qualification
1	Tampa Bay Rowdies	32	23	7	2	55	23	+32	71	Advance to USL Championship Playoffs
2	Charlotte Independence	32	18	9	5	57	36	+21	59	Advance to USL Championship Playoffs
3	Pittsburgh Riverhounds SC	32	17	8	7	52	34	+18	58 (Note: The USL decided to replay the sides' October 16 match from the 67th minute after the referee wrongly disallowed a Pittsburgh Riverhounds SC goal. The original score was 0–0.)	Advance to USL Championship Playoffs
4	Miami FC	32	16	10	6	55	40	+15	54	Advance to USL Championship Playoffs
5	Hartford Athletic	32	12	15	5	50	50	0	41	
6	Charleston Battery	32	10	15	7	49	60	−11	37	
7	New York Red Bulls II	32	7	18	7	42	67	−25	28	
8	Loudoun United FC	32	4	25	3	31	78	−47	15	

Source: USL

==== Results summary ====
Overall								Home						Away					
Pld	W	D	L	GF	GA	GD	Pts	W	D	L	GF	GA	GD	W	D	L	GF	GA	GD
32	16	6	10	55	40	+15	54	11	1	4	32	18	+14	5	5	6	23	22	+1

Last updated: October 30, 2021.
Source: Match reports

==== Match results ====
May 2 1	Miami FC	2–1	Loudoun United FC	Miami, Florida
7:30 p.m. EST	Craig 6'; Ackwei 7' (o.g.); Löbe (red card) 14'; François (yellow card) 59'; Reid (yellow card) 84'; Walker (yellow card) 90+1'	Report	Sergi (yellow card) 53'; Amoustapha 82'	Stadium: Riccardo Silva Stadium; Referee: Natalie Simon

May 8 2	Miami FC	0–1	Hartford Athletic	Miami, Florida
7:30 PM EDT	Williams (yellow card) 28'; Walker (yellow card) 32'; Craig (yellow card) 65'; Akinyode (yellow card) 71'	Report	Ashitey (yellow card) 45+1'; Preston 59', (yellow card) 82'	Stadium: Riccardo Silva Stadium; Referee: Matthew Thompson

May 14 3	New York Red Bulls II	0–1	Miami FC	Montclair, New Jersey
7:00 PM EDT	Carmona (yellow card) 42'; Sowe (yellow card) 49'; Castillo (yellow card) 57'; Knapp (yellow card) 81'; Egbo (yellow card) 81'	Report	Williams 15', (yellow card) 39'; del Campo (yellow card) 62'	Stadium: MSU Soccer Park; Attendance: 510; Referee: Sergii Demianchuk

May 22 4	Tampa Bay Rowdies	2–1	Miami FC	St. Petersburg, Florida
7:30 PM EDT	Dos Santos 12'; Hilton (yellow card) 65'; Guenzatti 79' (pen.)	Report	Palacios (yellow card) 17'; Forbes 38'; Akinyode (yellow card) 74'; Craig (yellow card) 84'	Stadium: Al Lang Stadium; Attendance: 2,518; Referee: Gabriele Giusti

May 29 5	Miami FC	2–1	Charlotte Independence	Miami, Florida
7:30 PM EDT	McFarlane 23'; Palacios (yellow card) 53'; Akinyode (yellow card) 60'; Reid 74'; Ballard (yellow card) 77'; Martínez (yellow card) 77'	Report	Areman 57'; de Villardi (yellow card) 71'	Stadium: Riccardo Silva Stadium; Referee: Jonathan Bilinski

June 6 6	Miami FC	2–4	Rio Grande Valley FC Toros	Miami, Florida
6:30 PM EDT	da Silva 15', (yellow card) 69'; Manley 19' (o.g.); Akinyode (red card) 56'; Palacios (yellow card) 82'; Sparrow (yellow card) 90+6'; Chapman-Page (yellow card) 90+8'	Report	Amoh 51', 66', 90+6'; Craig 69' (o.g.); Murphy (yellow card) 80'	Stadium: Riccardo Silva Stadium; Referee: Jeremy Scheer

June 12 7	Pittsburgh Riverhounds SC	1–1	Miami FC	Pittsburgh, Pennsylvania
7:00 PM EDT	Cicerone 9'; Williams (yellow card) 45+4'	Report	François 45+3'; Walker (yellow card) 90'; Palacios (yellow card) 90+4'	Stadium: Highmark Stadium; Attendance: 3,115; Referee: Brad Jensen

June 18 8	Charleston Battery	2–1	Miami FC	Mount Pleasant, South Carolina
7:00 PM EDT	Lewis 24'; Fahling (yellow card) 37'; Crawford (yellow card) 44'; Bunting 50'; Zarokostas (yellow card) 83'; Kelly-Rosales (yellow card) 90+4'	Report	Walker 7', (yellow card) 75'; Chapman-Page (yellow card) 54'	Stadium: Patriots Point Soccer Complex; Attendance: 2,085; Referee: William Steffen

June 23 9	Miami FC	0–1	Birmingham Legion FC	Miami, Florida
8:00 PM EDT	Ballard (yellow card) 19'; Akinyode (yellow card) 67'; Martínez (yellow card) 89'	Report	Williams (yellow card) 4'; Crognale (yellow card) 40'; Asiedu (yellow card) 71'; Herivaux (yellow card) 79'; Brett 82'; Lopez (yellow card) 90'	Stadium: Riccardo Silva Stadium; Referee: John Griggs

June 26 10	Miami FC	2–1	Charlotte Independence	Miami, Florida
7:30 PM EDT	Chapman-Page 18', (yellow card) 59'; Palacios (yellow card) 40'; Martínez 76', (yellow card) 90+3'	Report	Miller (yellow card) 17'; Kelly 32', (penalty missed) 54	Stadium: Riccardo Silva Stadium; Referee: Sergii Demianchuk

July 2 11	New York Red Bulls II	1–1	Miami FC	Montclair, New Jersey
7:00 PM EDT	LaCava 6'; Tombul (yellow card) 21'; Castillo (yellow card) 32'; Knapp (yellow card) 45+2'; Ngoma (yellow card) 60'; Egbo (yellow card) 68'; S. Williams (yellow card) 90+5'	Report	Othello 24'; D. Williams (yellow card) 62'	Stadium: MSU Soccer Park; Attendance: 518; Referee: Adam Kilpatrick

July 7 12	Miami FC	2–1	Tampa Bay Rowdies	Miami, Florida
7:30 PM EDT	Reid 21'; Chapman-Page (yellow card) 39', (goal) 77'; da Silva (yellow card) 90+3'	Report	Lasso (yellow card) 23'; Scarlett 51'	Stadium: Riccardo Silva Stadium; Referee: Thomas Snyder
Note: Paul Dalglish was unable to perform his role as Miami head coach due to a positive COVID-19 test and was replaced by assistant coach Andy Thomson

July 11 13	Loudoun United FC	1–4	Miami FC	Leesburg, Virginia
5:00 PM EDT	Ku-Dipietro (yellow card) 29'; Paz (penalty missed) 34; Walz (yellow card) 41', (goal) 75'; Gomez (yellow card) 59'	Report	Akinyode (yellow card) 18', (goal) 26'; da Silva (yellow card) 38'; Anglin (yellow card) 61'; François 70'; Martínez 73'; Forbes 90+2'	Stadium: Segra Field; Attendance: 402; Referee: John Matto
Note: Paul Dalglish was unable to perform his role as Miami head coach due to a positive COVID-19 test and was replaced by assistant coach Andy Thomson

July 17 14	Miami FC	2–1	Tampa Bay Rowdies	Miami, Florida
7:30 PM EDT	Martínez 10'; Othello 34'; Reid (yellow card) 90'	Report	Steinberger (yellow card) 28'; Guillén (yellow card) 36'; Dalgaard (yellow card) 60'; Fernandes 65'	Stadium: Riccardo Silva Stadium; Attendance: 723; Referee: Elvis Osmanovic
Note: Paul Dalglish was unable to perform his role as Miami head coach due to a positive COVID-19 test and was replaced by assistant coach Andy Thomson

July 24 15	Hartford Athletic	2–0	Miami FC	Hartford, Connecticut
7:00 PM EDT	Lara 30'; McGlynn 67'	Report	Palacios (yellow card) 59'; Reid (yellow card) 82'; Kcira (yellow card) 90+5'	Stadium: Dillon Stadium; Attendance: 4,983; Referee: Mathew Corrigan

August 1 16	Miami FC	3–2	Charleston Battery	Miami, Florida
7:30 PM EDT	Walker (yellow card) 3'; Martínez 45'; François 61'; Kcira (red card) 70'; Forbes 78'	Report	Daley 11'; Lewis 30'; Zarokostas (yellow card) 50'; Kelly-Rosales (yellow card) 90+3'	Stadium: Riccardo Silva Stadium; Attendance: 617; Referee: Brandon Stevis

August 4 17	Hartford Athletic	1–1	Miami FC	Hartford, Connecticut
7:00 PM EDT	Dodson (yellow card) 4'; Jamieson 14' (pen.); McGlynn (yellow card) 20'; Martinez (yellow card) 66'	Report	Craig (yellow card) 13'; Othello 25'; Palacios (yellow card) 49'	Stadium: Dillon Stadium; Attendance: 5,065; Referee: Danielle Chesky

August 11 18	Pittsburgh Riverhounds SC	2–3	Miami FC	Pittsburgh, Pennsylvania
6:00 PM EDT	Williamson 40'; Forbes 50'; Kilwien (yellow card) 81'	Report	Antonelli (yellow card) 14'; François 52'; D. Williams 53', 82' (pen.); Palacios (yellow card) 86'	Stadium: Highmark Stadium; Attendance: 2,821; Referee: Ismir Pekmic

August 14 19	Austin Bold FC	0–0	Miami FC	Austin, Texas
8:00 PM CDT	Fernandez (yellow card) 32'; Troncoso (yellow card) 45+2'; Walls (yellow card) 90+1'	Report	Sparrow (red card) 69'; Akinyode (yellow card) 74'; Chapman-Page (yellow card) 84'; Sylvestre (yellow card) 89'; François (red card) 90+2'	Stadium: Bold Stadium; Attendance: 1,226; Referee: Jeremy Scheer

August 22 20	Miami FC	2–0	Hartford Athletic	Miami, Florida
6:30 PM EDT	D. Williams (penalty missed) 45+1; Forbes 48', 90'; Sylvestre (yellow card) 87'	Report	Obregón Jr. (yellow card) 19'; Barrera (yellow card) 49'; Cedeño (yellow card) 67'; Rogers (yellow card) 85'	Stadium: Riccardo Silva Stadium; Attendance: 574; Referee: Elton García

August 29 21	Miami FC	3–0	New York Red Bulls II	Miami, Florida
6:30 PM EDT	Forbes 15'; Othello (yellow card) 62'; Walker 71', 90+5'	Report		Stadium: Riccardo Silva Stadium; Attendance: 586; Referee: Matthew Thompson

September 4 22	Charlotte Independence	2–2	Miami FC	Charlotte, North Carolina
8:00 PM EDT	Parra 19'; Martínez 44', (yellow card) 90+4'; Fuchs (yellow card) 46'; Roberts (yellow card) 46'; Bronico (yellow card) 73'; Pack (yellow card) 78'; Kelly (yellow card) 84'	Report	Craig 63'; Palacios (yellow card) 76'; François 88'	Stadium: American Legion Memorial Stadium; Attendance: 1,672; Referee: Adam Kilpatrick

September 11 23	Memphis 901 FC	0–2	Miami FC	Memphis, Tennessee
7:00 PM CDT	Oduro (yellow card) 29'; Fortune (yellow card) 57'	Report	da Silva (yellow card) 28'; François 32', 50'; Craig (yellow card) 68'; Chapman-Page (yellow card) 74'	Stadium: AutoZone Park; Attendance: 3,865; Referee: Benjamin Meyer

September 18 24	Miami FC	1–1	Charleston Battery	Miami, Florida
7:30 PM EDT	François (yellow card) 26'; Walker 67'	Report	Hogan 14'; Lewis (yellow card) 74'; Kelly-Rosales (yellow card) 82'	Stadium: Riccardo Silva Stadium; Attendance: 829; Referee: Calin Radosav

September 22 25	Charlotte Independence	2–0	Miami FC	Charlotte, North Carolina
7:00 PM EDT	Obertan 12'; Areman (yellow card) 40'; Palacios 64' (o.g.)	Report	Chapman-Page (yellow card) 31'; Akinyode (yellow card) 81'	Stadium: American Legion Memorial Stadium; Attendance: 1,113; Referee: Elijio Arreguin

September 25 26	Miami FC	6–1	Loudoun United FC	Miami, Florida
7:30 PM EDT	François (yellow card) 9', (goal) 55', 63'; Martínez 25'; Forbes 32'; Walker 39'; Reid 81'; Palacios (yellow card) 88'	Report	Ku-DiPietro 48'	Stadium: Riccardo Silva Stadium; Attendance: 418; Referee: Brandon Stevis

October 2 27	Miami FC	3–2	Pittsburgh Riverhounds SC	Miami, Florida
7:30 PM EDT	Walker 4'; Martínez (yellow card) 22'; Chapman-Page (yellow card) 29'; Bah 83'; da Silva 90'	Report	Forbes 3', 67'; Griffin (yellow card) 45+3'; Russell Cicerone (yellow card) 90+2'	Stadium: Riccardo Silva Stadium; Attendance: 748; Referee: Ekaterina Koroleva

October 10 28	Loudoun United FC	3–2	Miami FC	Leesburg, Virginia
1:00 PM EDT	Paz (yellow card) 5' (yellow-red card) 26'; Greene 20'; Landry (yellow card) 32'; Bolívar (yellow card) 72', (goal) 86'; Ku-DiPietro 77' (pen.); Clark (yellow card) 90+4'	Report	François 13' (pen.); Akinyode (yellow card) 31'; Walker (yellow card) 65'; Cortez 74'; Craig (red card) 75'; Reid (yellow card) 88'	Stadium: Segra Field; Referee: Matthew Franz

October 16 29	Miami FC	P–P	Pittsburgh Riverhounds SC	Miami, Florida
7:30 PM EDT	Chapman-Page (yellow card) 72'	Report	Dover (yellow card) 33'; Forbes (yellow card) 54'; Griffin (yellow card) 62'	Stadium: Riccardo Silva Stadium; Attendance: 1,083; Referee: Jonathan Bilinski

October 20 30	Tampa Bay Rowdies	3–0	Miami FC	St. Petersburg, Florida
7:30 PM EDT	Guenzatti 3', 71'; Antley (yellow card) 56'; Dos Santos 76'	Report	Kcira (yellow card) 38'; Craig (yellow card) 63'	Stadium: Al Lang Stadium; Attendance: 3,976; Referee: Matthew Thompson

October 24 31	Miami FC	2–0	New York Red Bulls II	Miami, Florida
7:30 PM EDT	Reid 18'; Kcira (yellow card) 48'; Chapman-Page (yellow card) 68'; François 83'	Report	Zajec (yellow card) 29'; LaCava (yellow card) 68'	Stadium: Riccardo Silva Stadium; Attendance: 715; Referee: Gabriele Giusti

October 27 29	Miami FC	0–1	Pittsburgh Riverhounds SC	Miami, Florida
7:00 PM EDT	Sparrow (yellow card) 80'; Akinyode (yellow card) 90+3'	Report	Dover (yellow card) 33'; Forbes (yellow card) 54'; Griffin (yellow card) 62'; Löbe 66' (o.g.); Cicerone (yellow card) 81'	Stadium: Riccardo Silva Stadium; Referee: Elvis Osmanovic

October 30 32	Charleston Battery	0–4	Miami FC	Mount Pleasant, South Carolina
7:00 PM EDT	Zarokostas (yellow card) 27'; Gdula (yellow card) 48'; Lewis (yellow card) 78'	Report	Chapman-Page (yellow card) 7'; Martínez 17'; Pérez 34'; Ballard (yellow card) 69'; Reid 81', 83'; Akinyode (yellow card) 84'	Stadium: Patriots Point Soccer Complex; Attendance: 2,771; Referee: Chris Ruska

=== USL Championship Playoffs ===
November 6 Conference Quarterfinals	Louisville City FC	1–0	Miami FC	Louisville, Kentucky
8:00 PM EST	Gonzalez Asensi 74'; Lancaster (yellow card) 87'; Greig (yellow card) 89'	Report	Craig (yellow card) 24'; da Silva (yellow card) 72'	Stadium: Lynn Family Stadium; Attendance: 9,097; Referee: Elton García

=== U.S. Open Cup ===
As a team playing in a recognized professional league, Miami normally automatically qualified for the U.S. Open Cup. However, with the 2021 edition shorted due to the COVID-19 pandemic, the Championship has only been allotted four teams spots. On March 29, US Soccer announced the four teams taking part from the league with Miami being left out.

On July 20, U.S. Soccer announced that the 2021 tournament was cancelled.

== Squad statistics ==
As of Match played November 6, 2021

=== Appearances and goals ===
No.	Pos	Nat	Player	Total		Regular Season		Playoffs	
No.	Pos	Nat	Player	Apps	Goals	Apps	Goals	Apps	Goals
Goalkeepers
24	GK	(United States) USA	Connor Sparrow	31	0	31+0	0	0+0	0
92	GK	(Haiti) HAI	Brian Sylvestre	2	0	1+1	0	0+0	0
Defenders
2	DF	(Liberia) LBR	Othello Bah	23	4	16+7	4	0+0	0
3	DF	(Italy) ITA	Luca Antonelli	11	0	4+7	0	0+0	0
4	DF	(England) ENG	Callum Chapman-Page	27	2	23+3	2	1+0	0
5	DF	(England) ENG	Paco Craig	33	2	31+1	2	1+0	0
17	DF	(Jamaica) JAM	Sean McFarlane	23	1	12+10	1	1+0	0
19	DF	(Germany) GER	János Löbe	29	0	19+10	0	0+0	0
Midfielders
14	MF	(United States) USA	Robert Baggio Kcira	25	0	14+10	0	1+0	0
18	MF	(Colombia) COL	Junior Palacios	27	0	22+5	0	0+0	0
25	MF	(United States) USA	Lance Rozeboom	3	0	3+0	0	0+0	0
30	MF	(Nigeria) NGR	Bolu Akinyode	32	1	31+0	1	1+0	0
80	MF	(Jamaica) JAM	Devon Williams	24	3	22+1	3	1+0	0
99	MF	(Jamaica) JAM	Jahshaun Anglin	15	0	4+11	0	0+0	0
Forwards
7	FW	(Turks and Caicos Islands) TCA	Billy Forbes	26	7	10+15	7	0+1	0
8	FW	(El Salvador) ESA	Joshua Pérez	7	1	3+4	1	0+0	0
9	FW	(Haiti) HAI	Christiano François	32	11	26+5	11	1+0	0
10	FW	(Cuba) CUB	Ariel Martínez	30	6	21+8	6	1+0	0
11	FW	(United States) USA	Richard Ballard	22	0	12+9	0	1+0	0
13	FW	(Jamaica) JAM	Lamar Walker	25	6	18+7	6	0+0	0
15	FW	(United States) USA	Chris Cortez	5	1	0+4	1	0+1	0
21	FW	(Canada) CAN	Adonijah Reid	30	6	9+20	6	0+1	0
98	FW	(United States) USA	Pierre da Silva	26	2	17+8	2	1+0	0
Left during season
1	GK	(United States) USA	Luis Zamudio	0	0	0+0	0	-	-
49	GK	(United States) USA	Jeff Caldwell	1	0	0+0	0	1+0	0
76	DF	(Mexico) MEX	Ramón Martín del Campo	3	0	3+0	0	-	-

=== Goal scorers ===
Place	Position	Nation	Number	Name	Regular Season	Playoffs	Total
1	FW	(Haiti)	9	Christiano François	11	0	11
2	MF	(Turks and Caicos Islands)	7	Billy Forbes	7	0	7
3	FW	(Cuba)	10	Ariel Martínez	6	0	6
3	FW	(Jamaica)	13	Lamar Walker	6	0	6
3	FW	(Canada)	21	Adonijah Reid	6	0	6
4	DF	(Liberia)	2	Othello Bah	4	0	4
5	MF	(Jamaica)	80	Devon Williams	3	0	3
6	DF	(England)	4	Callum Chapman-Page	2	0	2
6	DF	(England)	5	Paco Craig	2	0	2
6	FW	(United States)	98	Pierre da Silva	2	0	2
6				Own goal	2	0	2
7	FW	(El Salvador)	8	Joshua Pérez	1	0	1
7	FW	(United States)	15	Chris Cortez	1	0	1
7	DF	(Jamaica)	17	Sean McFarlane	1	0	1
7	MF	(Nigeria)	30	Bolu Akinyode	1	0	1

=== Disciplinary record ===
Number	Nation	Position	Name	Regular Season		Playoffs		Total	
Number	Nation	Position	Name	Yellow card	Red card	Yellow card	Red card	Yellow card	Red card
2	(Liberia)	DF	Othello Bah	1	0	0	0	1	0
3	(Italy)	DF	Luca Antonelli	1	0	0	0	1	0
4	(England)	DF	Callum Chapman-Page	10	0	0	0	10	0
5	(England)	DF	Paco Craig	5	1	1	0	6	1
9	(Haiti)	FW	Christiano François	3	1	0	0	3	1
10	(Cuba)	FW	Ariel Martínez	4	0	0	0	4	0
11	(United States)	FW	Richard Ballard	3	0	0	0	3	0
13	(Jamaica)	FW	Lamar Walker	6	0	0	0	6	0
14	(United States)	MF	Robert Baggio Kcira	3	0	0	0	3	0
18	(Colombia)	MF	Junior Palacios	10	0	0	0	10	0
19	(Germany)	DF	János Löbe	0	1	0	0	0	1
21	(England)	FW	Adonijah Reid	4	0	0	0	4	0
24	(United States)	GK	Connor Sparrow	2	1	0	0	2	1
30	(Nigeria)	MF	Bolu Akinyode	10	1	0	0	10	1
76	(Mexico)	DF	Ramón Martín del Campo	1	0	0	0	1	0
80	(Jamaica)	MF	Devon Williams	3	0	0	0	3	0
92	(Haiti)	GK	Brian Sylvestre	2	0	0	0	2	0
98	(United States)	FW	Pierre da Silva	4	0	1	0	5	0
99	(Jamaica)	MF	Jahshaun Anglin	1	0	0	0	1	0

== Notes ==
1. ^{A} Only includes the nine matches that were not played behind closed doors. Also includes October 16 match attendance, which was resumed from a specific point in the match on October 30 behind closed doors.
2. ^{B} Concerning the October match against Pittsburgh Riverhounds SC; seven Miami players started both the original game on the 16th and the resumption on Oct. 30. Despite USL's announcement mentioning teams would be allowed new rosters for this match the other four original starters (Richard Ballard, János Löbe, Othello Bah, and Lamar Walker) are still listed as starters by both the league and Soccerway. Their four replacements (Sean McFarlane, Paco Craig, Pierre da Silva, and Chris Cortez) are all listed as substitutes joining the match in the 67th minute. Both da Silva and Cortez came on as subs during the original match after the 67th minute as well and Craig was suspended for the original match due to a red card in Miami's previous game against Loudoun United FC. The three other Miami players substituted on after the 67th minute in the original match who did not play in the resumption (Junior Palacios, Adonijah Reid, and Joshua Pérez) have that cap removed from the record. Additionally, the yellow card shown to Callum Chapman-Page in the 72nd minute of the original match is not counted.
