= Callum Chapman-Page =

English footballer

Personal information
- Date of birth: 6 November 1995 (age 31)
- Place of birth: Manchester, England
- Position: Defender

Youth career
- –2010: Southampton
- 2013–2014: Ilkeston

College career
Years	Team	Apps	(Gls)
2014–2015	Lubbock Christian Chaparrals	30	(2)
2017–2018	Palm Beach Atlantic Sailfish	30	(4)

Senior career*
Years	Team	Apps	(Gls)
2016	Corinthians FC SA		
2018	South Georgia Tormenta	11	(3)
2019	Miami FC	8	(1)
2020	FC Tulsa	9	(0)
2021–2023	Miami FC	55	(4)
2023	→ Indy Eleven (loan)	9	(1)
2024	Indy Eleven	17	(0)
- * Club domestic league appearances and goals as of 21 November 2024

Callum Chapman-Page (born 6 November 1995) is an English footballer who last played as a defender for USL Championship club Indy Eleven.

== Career ==
=== Youth ===
Chapman-Page was released from the Southampton academy at the age of 14, before playing with the Ilkeston's youth team during their 2013–14 season.

=== United States ===
==== College (2014 – 2018) ====
Chapman-Page moved to the United States in 2014 to play college soccer at Lubbock Christian University, where he played for two seasons. He didn't play at college in 2016, but instead appeared for NPSL side Corinthians FC of San Antonio, where he scored in the second round of the Lamar Hunt US Open Cup during a 3–1 loss to San Antonio FC.

Chapman-Page transferred to Palm Beach Atlantic University in 2017, where he played for another two seasons and was named to All-SSC Second Team and CoSIDA Academic All-District Team.

During his 2018 college season, Chapman-Page played in the USL PDL with South Georgia Tormenta.

==== Miami FC (2019) ====
Following college, Chapman-Page signed with NPSL side Miami FC.

==== FC Tulsa (2020) ====
On 18 December 2019, Chapman-Page joined USL Championship side FC Tulsa ahead of their 2020 season. He made his debut for Tulsa on 1 August 2020, appearing as a 78th-minute substitute during a 2–1 win over Rio Grande Valley FC.

==== Return to Miami (2021 – 2023) ====
Chapman-Page returned to Miami FC, now a member of the USL Championship, on 12 January 2021.

==== Indy Eleven (2023 – 2024) ====
On 22 July 2023, Chapman-Page was loaned to USL Championship side Indy Eleven for the remainder of the 2023 season. On 17 November 2023, the club announced that they had signed Chapman-Page on a permanent deal and he would return for the 2024 USL Championship season. He made his permanent debut for the club on 9 March in a 2–1 defeat at Oakland Roots. Chapman-Page assisted Douglas Martinez for the winning goal in a 2–1 victory over North Carolina FC on April 27. Chapman-Page ended the 2024 season with 19 total appearances, including the club's historic semifinal appearance in the Open Cup. On 20 November 2024, Indy Eleven announced that Chapman-Page would not return the following season.

== Career statistics ==
=== Club ===
As of match played 3 November 2024

Appearances and goals by club, season and competition
Club	Season	League			Playoffs		Cup		Continental		Total	
Club	Season	Division	Apps	Goals	Apps	Goals	Apps	Goals	Apps	Goals	Apps	Goals
Tormenta FC	2018	PDL	11	3	0	0	1	0	–		12	3
Miami FC	2019	NPSL	7	1	5	1	1	0	–		13	2
Miami FC	2019	NISA	1	0	1	0	-	-	–		2	0
FC Tulsa	2020	USL C	9	0	1	1	-	-	–		10	1
Miami FC	2021	USL C	26	2	1	0	-	-	–		27	2
Miami FC	2022	USL C	18	2	1	0	1	0	–		20	2
Miami FC	2023	USL C	11	0	0	0	0	0	–		11	0
Indy Eleven (loan)	2023	USL C	9	1	0	0	0	0	–		9	1
Indy Eleven	2024	USL C	17	0	0	0	2	0	–		19	0
Career total			109	9	9	2	5	0	0	0	123	11
