= Junior Palacios =

Colombian footballer (born 1996)

Personal information
- Full name: Carlos Octavio Palacios Salazar
- Date of birth: 26 July 1996 (age 30)
- Place of birth: Cali, Colombia
- Height: 6 ft 1 in (1.85 m)
- Positions: Defender; midfielder

Team information
- Current team: Naples United

Youth career
- Alianza Petrolera

Senior career*
Years	Team	Apps	(Gls)
2016	Fort Lauderdale Strikers U-23	15	(0)
2018	Boca Raton FC	10	(0)
2019	Florida Soccer Soldiers	26	
2021–2022	Miami FC	44	(1)
2023	Union Omaha	14	(3)
2024	Miami United		
2024	Miami FC	18	(0)
2025–	Naples United		
- * Club domestic league appearances and goals as of 20 March 2025

Carlos Octavio "Junior" Palacios Salazar (born 26 July 1996) is a Colombian professional footballer who plays for Naples United FC in the National Premier Soccer League.

== Career ==
=== Amateur ===
In the 2010s, Palacios played amateur soccer for multiple teams across Florida. In 2016, he played five regular season matches for Fort Lauderdale Strikers U-23 during the team's first and only season in the National Premier Soccer League. He played for NPSL side Boca Raton FC in 2018, making his debut in the season opener against Miami United FC and getting sent off in the 75th minute. The following year, he played with the Florida Soccer Soldiers during the 2020 U.S. Open Cup qualification tournament's second round in a losing effort to Miami United FC's U-23 team.

=== Professional ===
On 5 January 2021, Palacios signed a professional contract with Miami FC of the USL Championship after spending 2020 as a trialist with the team. He made his first appearance as a second-half substitute on 8 May against Hartford Athletic.

On 31 January 2023 it was announced that Palacios had signed with Union Omaha of USL League One.

Palacios joined National Premier Soccer League club Miami United FC in March 2024.

On 19 June 2024, Palacios returned to Miami FC on a short-term deal.

In 2025, Palacios joined Naples United FC ahead of their 2025 U.S. Open Cup appearance.

== Career statistics ==
As of matches played 4 November 2021

Club	Season	League			Cup (Note: Includes appearances in U.S. Open Cup)		League Cup		Total	
Club	Season	Division	Apps	Goals	Apps	Goals	Apps	Goals	Apps	Goals
Fort Lauderdale Strikers U-23	2016	National Premier Soccer League	5	0	0	0	0	0	5	0
Boca Raton FC	2018	National Premier Soccer League	3	0	0	0	0	0	3	0
Miami FC	2021	USL Championship	27	0	0	0	0	0	27	0
Career total			35	0	0	0	0	0	35	0
