= Adonijah Reid =

Canadian soccer player (born 1999)

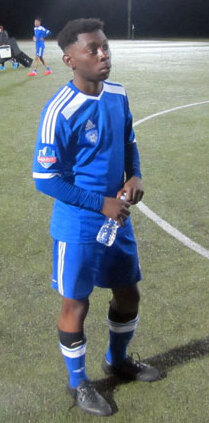
- Reid in 2015 with ANB Futbol

Personal information
- Date of birth: August 13, 1999 (age 27)
- Place of birth: Brampton, Ontario, Canada
- Height: 1.68 m (5 ft 6 in)
- Position: Forward

Team information
- Current team: HFX Wanderers FC

Youth career
- 2005–2011: Caledon SC
- 2011–2016: ANB Futbol

Senior career*
Years	Team	Apps	(Gls)
2015	ANB Futbol	20	(20)
2017–2018	FC Dallas	0	(0)
2017–2018	→ Ottawa Fury (loan)	41	(5)
2019	Le Havre II	4	(0)
2021–2022	Miami FC	51	(9)
2023–2024	Pacific FC	41	(3)
2025	York United FC	25	(4)
2026	Sporting JAX	1	(0)
2026–	HFX Wanderers FC	11	(0)

International career^{‡}
2018	Canada U20	5	(1)
- * Club domestic league appearances and goals as of October 18, 2026 ‡ National team caps and goals as of November 10, 2018

Adonijah Reid (born August 13, 1999) is a Canadian soccer player who currently plays as a forward for HFX Wanderers FC in the Canadian Premier League.

== Early life ==
Reid began playing youth soccer with Caledon SC, in 2005. Afterwards, he joined ANB Futbol Academy, where he played for six years. In 2014 and 2015, he had trials with French clubs OGC Nice and Lyon, and also had trials with clubs in Italy and Spain. However, as he was not a European citizen, he was unable to remain in Europe.

== Club career ==
In 2015, at age 16, he played with ANB Futbol in League1 Ontario. He finished as the league's joint highest goalscorer as a 16 year old with 20 goals in 20 appearances earning joint Golden Boot honours. He was also named the league's Young Player of the Year and was named a First Team All-Star.

In January 2017, Reid signed a Generation Adidas contract with Major League Soccer, being part of the first Generation Adidas Canada class. He was then selected in the second round (40th overall) of the 2017 MLS SuperDraft by FC Dallas. During the 2017 pre-season, he scored a goal in a friendly against Argentinian club River Plate. However, as he was under the age of 18, he was unable to appear for Dallas in an official match, due to FIFA regulations. In July 2017, he was loaned to USL club Ottawa Fury FC. He would make his professional debut on July 29, 2017 against Toronto FC II. On August 12, 2017, he scored his first professional goal in a 3-1 victory over the Charlotte Independence. In March 2018, he re-joined Ottawa for a second loan stint. On June 24, 2018, Reid scored a hat trick in a 3-0 win over New York Red Bulls II. The performance earned him USL Player of the Week honours. At the end of the season, he was named to the USL 20 under 20 list, coming in at #8. Over his two years on loan with Ottawa, he scored five goals in 41 league matches. After the 2018 season, Dallas declined his contract option for 2019.

In January 2019, Reid signed with French side Le Havre AC. He played with the second team in the Championnat National 2.

In January 2021, Reid signed with Miami FC of the USL Championship. On May 29, 2021, he scored his first goal for the club against the Charlotte Independence. On October 30, 2021, he scored a brace against the Charleston Battery.

In January 2023, he signed with Pacific FC of the Canadian Premier League. He made his debut for the club on April 20, 2023 in a Canadian Championship match against Cavalry FC, in a substitute appearance. The club declined his option for 2025.

In January 2025, Reid signed with York United FC for the 2025 season with an option for 2026. He scored his first goal for the club on May 6, 2025, in a 5-0 victory over FC Laval in the 2025 Canadian Championship. He scored his first league goal for York United on June 29, in a 2-2 draw against Forge FC.

In January 2026, Reid signed a two-year contract with USL Championship expansion club Sporting JAX.

In July 2026, he joined the HFX Wanderers FC in the Canadian Premier League, in a player swap with Marcus Godinho moving to Sporting JAX.

== International career ==
In 2011, he played for Eastern Canada for the Danone Cup qualifiers, where his team defeating the Western Canada team to advance to the international U12 tournament, where Canada finished sixth and Reid scored against England.

Reid made his debut in the Canada U-15 national team program at an identification camp in March 2014. He then attended several other U15 and U18 camps over the next couple of years. In January 2018, he was called to a Canada U23 camp in preparation for qualification for the 2020 Summer Olympics. Reid was named to the Canadian U20 squad for the 2018 CONCACAF U-20 Championship. On November 4, 2018, he scored his first international goal in Canada's second match against Guadeloupe, netting the game-winner in a 2-1 victory.

Reid is also eligible to play for Jamaica through his parents.

== Career statistics ==
As of March 7, 2026

Club	League	Season	League		Playoffs		Domestic Cup		League Cup		Continental		Total	
Club	League	Season	Apps	Goals	Apps	Goals	Apps	Goals	Apps	Goals	Apps	Goals	Apps	Goals
ANB Futbol	League1 Ontario	2015	20	20	—		—		4	2	—		24	22
FC Dallas	Major League Soccer	2017	0	0	—		0	0	—		0	0	0	0
Ottawa Fury (loan)	USL	2017	12	1	—		0	0	—		—		12	1
Ottawa Fury (loan)	USL	2018	29	4	—		4	0	—		—		33	4
Ottawa Fury (loan)	Total		41	5	0	0	4	0	0	0	0	0	45	5
Le Havre II	Championnat National 2	2018–19	4	0	—		—		—		—		4	0
Miami FC	USL Championship	2021	29	6	1	0	—		—		—		30	6
Miami FC	USL Championship	2022	22	3	1	0	2	1	—		—		25	4
Miami FC	Total		51	9	2	0	2	1	0	0	0	0	55	10
Pacific FC	Canadian Premier League	2023	23	3	3	1	3	1	—		—		29	5
Pacific FC	Canadian Premier League	2024	18	0	1	0	3	0	—		—		22	0
Pacific FC	Total		41	3	4	1	6	1	0	0	0	0	51	5
York United FC	Canadian Premier League	2023	25	4	2	0	3	1	—		—		30	5
Sporting JAX	USL Championship	2026	1	0	0	0	0	0	0	0	0	0	1	0
Career Total			183	40	8	1	15	3	4	2	0	0	210	46
