= Sean McFarlane =

Jamaican footballer (born 1993)

Personal information
- Date of birth: 4 April 1993 (age 33)
- Place of birth: Kingston, Jamaica
- Height: 6 ft 0 in (1.83 m)
- Position: Defender

College career
Years	Team	Apps	(Gls)
2011–2012	Saint Leo Lions	23	(4)
2013–2014	FIU Panthers	31	(4)

Senior career*
Years	Team	Apps	(Gls)
2012	Chattanooga FC		
2016	Tampa Bay Rowdies 2	4	(0)
2017	Colorado Springs Switchbacks	29	(2)
2018	Miami FC 2	12	(1)
2019–2020	Austin Bold	46	(4)
2021–2022	Miami FC	27	(1)
2022	→ FC Tulsa (loan)	14	(0)
2025	Mount Pleasant F.A.	7	(0)

International career
2012–2013	Jamaica U20		
2013	Jamaica U23		
Medal record
Men's football
Representing Jamaica
CONCACAF Gold Cup
Runner-up	2015 United States–Canada	Team
- * Club domestic league appearances and goals as of 13:16, 20 October 2022 (UTC)

Sean McFarlane (born 4 April 1993) is a Jamaican professional footballer.

== Career ==
=== Club ===
McFarlane played college soccer at Saint Leo University and Florida International University. He has also appeared for National Premier Soccer League sides Chattanooga FC and Tampa Bay Rowdies 2.

McFarlane signed for United Soccer League side Colorado Springs Switchbacks 9 February 2017.

In September 2018, it was announced that McFarlane would join United Soccer League expansion side Austin Bold for the 2019 season.

On 6 January 2021, McFarlane signed with USL Championship side Miami FC.

In June 2022, McFarlane was sent to FC Tulsa on loan for the remainder of the 2022 USL Championship season.

In February 2025, McFarlane joined Mount Pleasant F.A. in the Jamaica Premier league on a 6-month contract.

=== International ===
McFarlane has been capped at the Under-20 level for Jamaica.

== Career statistics ==
=== Club ===
As of match played October 16, 2022

Appearances and goals by club, season and competition
Club	Season	League			Playoffs		Cup		Continental		Total	
Club	Season	Division	Apps	Goals	Apps	Goals	Apps	Goals	Apps	Goals	Apps	Goals
Tampa Bay Rowdies 2	2016	NPSL	4	0	0	0	0	0	–		4	0
Switchbacks FC	2017	USL	29	2	0	0	2	0	–		31	2
Miami FC 2	2018	NPSL	12	1	5	2	1	0	–		18	3
Austin Bold FC	2019	USLC	31	2	2	1	3	0	–		36	3
Austin Bold FC	2020	USLC	15	2	0	0	-	-	–		15	2
Miami FC	2021	USLC	22	1	1	0	-	-	–		23	1
Miami FC	2022	USLC	5	0	-	-	0	0	–		5	0
FC Tulsa	2022	USLC	14	0	-	-	-	-	–		14	0
Career total			132	8	8	3	6	0	0	0	146	11

== Honors ==
Miami FC

- Sunshine Conference Championship: 2018
- South Region Championship: 2018
- National Championship: 2018
