= Joshua Pérez =

Salvadoran footballer (born 1998)

Personal information
- Full name: Joshua Giovanni Pérez Figueroa
- Date of birth: 21 January 1998 (age 28)
- Place of birth: Montebello, California, United States
- Height: 1.65 m (5 ft 5 in)
- Position: Forward

Team information
- Current team: Odra Opole
- Number: 11

Youth career
- 2011–2013: Chivas USA
- 2013–2016: Fiorentina

Senior career*
Years	Team	Apps	(Gls)
2016–2018	Fiorentina	1	(0)
2017–2018	→ Livorno (loan)	22	(0)
2018–2019	Los Angeles FC	15	(1)
2018	→ Phoenix Rising (loan)	1	(0)
2019	→ Phoenix Rising (loan)	1	(0)
2020	Castellón	0	(0)
2020–2021	Ibiza	7	(0)
2021–2022	Miami FC	34	(5)
2023	Montevarchi	11	(2)
2023–2024	Tampa Bay Rowdies	41	(2)
2025	Kotwica Kołobrzeg	9	(4)
2025–	Odra Opole	38	(0)

International career^{‡}
2013	United States U15	4	(2)
2014–2015	United States U17	22	(7)
2016	United States U19	2	(0)
2016	United States U20	4	(0)
2019	United States U23	1	(0)
2021	El Salvador U23	3	(2)
2021–	El Salvador	29	(3)
- * Club domestic league appearances and goals as of 14:05, 9 November 2026 (UTC) ‡ National team caps and goals as of 10:18, 18 November 2026 (UTC)

Joshua Giovanni Pérez Figueroa (born 21 January 1998) is a professional footballer who plays as a forward for I liga club Odra Opole. Born in the United States, he plays for the El Salvador national team.

== Club career ==
On 4 February 2016, Pérez signed with Fiorentina, having trained with the club regularly since 2013. On 28 November 2016, he made his debut against Inter Milan. On 31 August 2017, Fiorentina announced that they would loan Pérez to Serie C club Livorno for the upcoming season.

On 8 August 2018, Pérez returned to the Los Angeles area, signing with Los Angeles FC on a free transfer. Perez and Los Angeles mutually agreed to part ways on 7 February 2020.

On 25 June 2020, Pérez joined Segunda División B side Castellón, but left the club on 9 September, as the club was already promoted to Segunda División, without making any appearances. Hours after leaving Castellón, he joined UD Ibiza in the third division.

On 2 July 2021, after helping with seven appearances overall as Ibiza achieved a first-ever promotion to the second division, Pérez reached an agreement with the club to rescind his contract.

On 26 August 2021, Pérez returned to the USL Championship and signed a contract mid-season with Miami FC.

On 8 February 2023, Pérez signed with Montevarchi in the Italian third-tier Serie C.

Pérez joined the Tampa Bay Rowdies in the USL Championship on 17 August 2023. He left Tampa Bay following their 2024 season.

On 1 April 2025, Pérez signed with Polish second division club Kotwica Kołobrzeg. He scored four goals in nine games as Kotwica suffered relegation to the third tier and disbanded soon after.

On 21 June 2025, Pérez moved to another I liga club Odra Opole as a free agent, signing a two-year deal.

== International career ==
A longtime USA youth international, Pérez switched allegiance to El Salvador in February 2021, accepting a call-up to the U-23 side ahead of the CONCACAF Men's Olympic Qualifying Championship. He made his debut with the El Salvador U23s in a 2–0 loss to the Canada U23s on 19 March 2021. On 25 March 2021, he scored a brace against the Haiti U23s.

On 5 June 2021, Pérez made his debut with El Salvador senior team in a 7–0 victory against the U.S. Virgin Islands and scored one goal.

== Personal life ==
Joshua Pérez was born in Montebello, California, son of Giovanni Pérez and Susana Figueroa. His father was born in Los Angeles, California to Salvadoran parents, while his mother was born and raised in El Salvador and immigrated to the United States. Giovanni played as a professional soccer player, where he spent time at California Emperors and also played for El Salvador's FAS, a club which Giovanni's father and Joshua's grandfather Hugo Antonio Pérez played. Joshua is the nephew of former professional soccer player and manager of the El Salvador national team Hugo Pérez; Joshua represented El Salvador while his uncle was manager for two years.

== Career statistics ==
=== Club ===
As of match played 6 November 2026

Appearances and goals by club, season and competition
Club	Season	League			National cup (Note: Includes U.S. Open Cup, Polish Cup)		Continental		Other		Total	
Club	Season	Division	Apps	Goals	Apps	Goals	Apps	Goals	Apps	Goals	Apps	Goals
Fiorentina	2016–17	Serie A	1	0	0	0	—		—		1	0
Livorno (loan)	2017–18	Serie C Group A	22	0	—		—		3 (Note: Two appearances in Coppa Italia Serie C, one appearance in Supercoppa di Serie C)	0	25	0
Los Angeles FC	2018	Major League Soccer	2	0	0	0	—		—		2	0
Los Angeles FC	2019	Major League Soccer	13	1	1	0	—		—		14	1
Los Angeles FC	Total		15	1	1	0	—		—		16	1
Phoenix Rising (loan)	2018	USL Championship	1	0	0	0	—		—		1	0
Phoenix Rising (loan)	2019	USL Championship	1	0	0	0	—		—		1	0
Castellón	2020–21	Segunda División	0	0	0	0	—		—		0	0
Ibiza	2020–21	Segunda Div. B - Gr. III	6	0	0	0	—		1 (Note: Appearance in Segunda División B promotion play-offs)	0	7	0
Miami FC	2021	USL Championship	7	1	0	0	—		—		7	1
Miami FC	2022	USL Championship	27	4	1	0	—		1 (Note: Appearance(s) in USL Championship play-offs)	0	29	4
Miami FC	Total		34	5	1	0	—		1	0	36	5
Montevarchi	2022–23	Serie C Group C	11	2	—		—		—		0	0
Tampa Bay Rowdies	2023	USL Championship	10	1	0	0	—		1	0	11	1
Tampa Bay Rowdies	2024	USL Championship	31	1	2	1	—		2	0	35	2
Tampa Bay Rowdies	Total		41	2	2	1	—		3	0	46	2
Kotwica Kołobrzeg	2024–25	I liga	9	4	—		—		—		9	4
Odra Opole	2025–26	I liga	29	0	2	0	—		—		31	0
Odra Opole	2026–27	I liga	9	0	2	0	—		—		11	0
Odra Opole	Total		38	0	4	0	—		—		42	0
Career total			179	14	8	1	0	0	8	0	195	15

=== International ===
As of match played 17 November 2026

Appearances and goals by national team and year
National team	Year	Apps	Goals
El Salvador	2021	16	3
El Salvador	2022	1	0
El Salvador	2023	5	0
El Salvador	2024	0	0
El Salvador	2025	5	0
El Salvador	2026	2	0
Total		29	3

Scores and results list El Salvador's goal tally first, score column indicates score after each Pérez goal.

International goals by date, venue, cap, opponent, score, result and competition
No.	Date	Venue	Opponent	Score	Result	Competition
1	5 June 2021	Bethlehem Soccer Stadium, Upper Bethlehem, U.S. Virgin Islands	U.S. Virgin Islands	4–0	7–0	2022 FIFA World Cup qualification
2	12 June 2021	Warner Park, Basseterre, Saint Kitts and Nevis	Saint Kitts and Nevis	2–0	4–0	2022 FIFA World Cup qualification
3	16 June 2021	Estadio Cuscatlán, San Salvador, El Salvador	Saint Kitts and Nevis	1–0	2–0	2022 FIFA World Cup qualification
