= Juan Castillo (footballer, born 2002) =

Colombian footballer

Personal information
- Full name: Juan Camilo Castillo Andrade
- Date of birth: 3 October 2002 (age 24)
- Place of birth: Tumaco, Colombia
- Height: 1.82 m (6 ft 0 in)
- Position: Defender

Youth career
- –2021: Millonarios

Senior career*
Years	Team	Apps	(Gls)
2021–2022	New York Red Bulls II	46	(0)
2022	New York Red Bulls	0	(0)
2023–2024	Philadelphia Union II	27	(1)
2024–2025	Fortaleza CEIF	33	(1)
2025–2026	Pari Nizhny Novgorod	20	(0)

International career
- Colombia U17
- Colombia U20
- * Club domestic league appearances and goals as of 22 April 2026

Juan Camilo Castillo Andrade (born 3 October 2002) is a Colombian professional footballer who plays as a defender.

== Club career ==
=== Millonarios ===
Born in Tumaco, Castillo began his football career with local clubs Zipaquirá San Pablo and Expreso Dorado before joining the youth ranks of storied Colombian side Millonarios.

=== New York Red Bulls II ===
On 13 April 2021, Castillo left Millonarios, where he had been playing with the team's under-20 side in the Copa Libertadores U-20, to sign with USL Championship side New York Red Bulls II. He made his debut for New York on 14 May 2021, starting in a 1–0 loss to the Miami FC. Castillo re-signed with New York on 27 January 2022.

==== New York Red Bulls (loan) ====
On 22 June 2022, the New York Red Bulls announced that they had signed Castillo to a short-term loan ahead of their 2022 U.S. Open Cup quarterfinal against New York City FC.

=== Philadelphia Union II ===
On 24 January 2023, Castillo was announced as a new signing for MLS Next Pro side Philadelphia Union II.

=== Pari Nizhny Novgorod ===
On 17 January 2025, Castillo signed a long-term contract with Russian Premier League club Pari Nizhny Novgorod.

== International career ==
Castillo has represented Colombia at the under-17 and under-20 level.

== Career statistics ==
As of 22 April 2026

Club	Season	League			Cup		Other		Total	
Club	Season	Division	Apps	Goals	Apps	Goals	Apps	Goals	Apps	Goals
New York Red Bulls II	2021	USL Championship	29	0	—		—		29	0
New York Red Bulls II	2022	USL Championship	17	0	—		—		17	0
New York Red Bulls II	Total		46	0	0	0	0	0	46	0
New York Red Bulls	2022	Major League Soccer	0	0	0	0	—		0	0
Philadelphia Union II	2023	MLS Next Pro	27	1	—		1 (Note: Appearances in play-offs)	1	28	2
Fortaleza CEIF	2024	Categoría Primera A	33	1	3	0	—		36	1
Pari Nizhny Novgorod	2024–25	Russian Premier League	11	0	—		2 (Note: Appearances in relegation play-offs)	0	13	0
Pari Nizhny Novgorod	2025–26	Russian Premier League	9	0	3	1	—		12	1
Pari Nizhny Novgorod	Total		20	0	3	1	2	0	25	1
Career total			126	2	6	1	!3	1	135	4
