= Lamar Walker =

Jamaican football player (born 2000)

Personal information
- Date of birth: 26 September 2000 (age 26)
- Place of birth: Spanish Town, Jamaica
- Position: Midfielder

Team information
- Current team: Mount Pleasant

Senior career*
Years	Team	Apps	(Gls)
2017–2020	Portmore United	27	(5)
2021–2022	Miami FC	47	(7)
2022–2023	Portmore United	?	(?)
2023–2024	Al Dhaid		
2024–2025	Majd		
2025–	Mount Pleasant		

International career
2019	Jamaica U23		
2019–	Jamaica	8	(1)
- * Club domestic league appearances and goals

Lamar Walker (born 26 September 2000) is a Jamaican professional footballer who plays for Mount Pleasant and the Jamaica national team.

== Early life and education ==
Walker played his schoolboy football at Clarendon College in Jamaica.

== Career ==
=== Club ===
Walker played for Portmore United in Jamaica.

On 29 January 2021, Walker signed with Miami FC of the USL Championship.

Walker moved back to Portmore United in his native Jamaica in 2022, after winning the domestic Lynk Cup, he made a move to the United Arab Emirates to First Division club Al Dhaid.

=== International ===
He debuted internationally in his national youth team with the Jamaica U22 team for the 2019 Pan American Games in Peru.

On 12 October 2019, he made his senior debut with 2–0 victory against Aruba in the CONCACAF Nations League.

On 15 October 2019, Walker scored his first goal for Jamaica against Aruba and won two consecutive games with a 0–6 victory in the CONCACAF Nations League.

== Career statistics ==
=== Club ===
As of 23 July 2021

Club	Season	League			Cup		Continental		Other		Total	
Club	Season	Division	Apps	Goals	Apps	Goals	Apps	Goals	Apps	Goals	Apps	Goals
Portmore United	2017–18	National Premier League	4	0	0	0	0	0	0	0	4	0
Portmore United	2018–19	National Premier League	10	3	3	0	0	0	0	0	13	3
Portmore United	2019–20	National Premier League	14	2	0	0	0	0	0	0	14	2
Miami F.C.	2021	USL Championship	18	4	0	0	0	0	0	0	18	4
Career total			46	9	0	0	0	0	0	0	49	9

== International goals ==
Scores and results list Jamaica's goal tally first.

No.	Date	Venue	Opponent	Score	Result	Competition
1.	15 October 2019	Ergilio Hato Stadium, Willemstad, Curaçao	Aruba	3–0	6–0	2019–20 CONCACAF Nations League B

== Honors ==
Portmore United

- Jamaica National Premier League: 2018–19
- CFU Club Championship: 2019
