= Noah Abrams =

American soccer player

Personal information
- Full name: Noah Abrams
- Date of birth: January 23, 1998 (age 28)
- Place of birth: New York City, United States
- Height: 1.85 m (6 ft 1 in)
- Position: Goalkeeper

Youth career
- Arsenal
- Chelsea
- –2017: Black Rock FC

College career
Years	Team	Apps	(Gls)
2017–2019	Northeastern Huskies	20	(0)

Senior career*
Years	Team	Apps	(Gls)
2017	FA Euro New York	2	(0)
2018	Brazos Valley Cavalry	2	(0)
2021	Beitar Tel Aviv Bat Yam	0	(0)
2021	Loudoun United	1	(0)
2022–2023	Miami FC	0	(0)
2022	→ Charlotte Independence (loan)	1	(0)
2023	→ Charlotte Independence (loan)	1	(0)
- * Club domestic league appearances and goals as of October 19, 2022

Noah Abrams (born January 23, 1998) is a former American soccer player who played as a goalkeeper.

== Career ==
=== Youth ===
Born in New York City, Abrams moved to England with his family when he was six years old. While living in England, Abrams played for numerous Premier League Youth Academies including Arsenal, Chelsea and Tottenham. At the age of 17, Abrams moved back to America to continue his education. He attended the Berkshire School, where he played for three years as part of the soccer team, where he served as captain. Abrams played club soccer for Black Rock FC, where he captained the team for two years.

Abrams holds citizenships from the United States, Great Britain and Israel.

=== College and amateur ===
In 2017, Abrams began attending Northeastern University, where he also played college soccer. In 2018, he suffered a serious concussion in a match which ended his season. In three seasons from 2017 to 2019 (the 2020 season was cancelled due to the COVID-19 pandemic), he made 20 appearances for the Huskies, recording 59 saves and 6 clean sheets.

In the spring of 2019, Abrams was voted the Northeastern Athletics Excellence in Strength and Conditioning award for efforts in rehab and recovery from his serious concussion suffered in the fall of 2018.

Whilst at college, Abrams also appeared in the USL PDL for FA Euro New York in 2017, making two appearances. In 2018, he played with Brazos Valley Cavalry, making two further appearances in the PDL.

=== Professional ===
In 2020, Abrams trained with USL Championship side Loudoun United, before signing his first professional contact with Israeli Liga Leumit side Beitar Tel Aviv Bat Yam.

On April 2, 2021, Abrams returned to the United States to join Loudoun United. Abrams made his professional debut on 8 September 2021, starting against Charlotte Independence in a loss.

Abrams signed with Miami FC on January 31, 2022. In early June, Abrams joined USL League One's Charlotte Independence on a short-term loan deal. Despite only playing one game for Charlotte, Abrams won save of the week for one of his stops while on loan. In March 2023, Abrams again joined Charlotte on loan.

Noah also serves as the Vice President of the USL Players Association.
