= Robert Baggio Kcira =

American soccer player

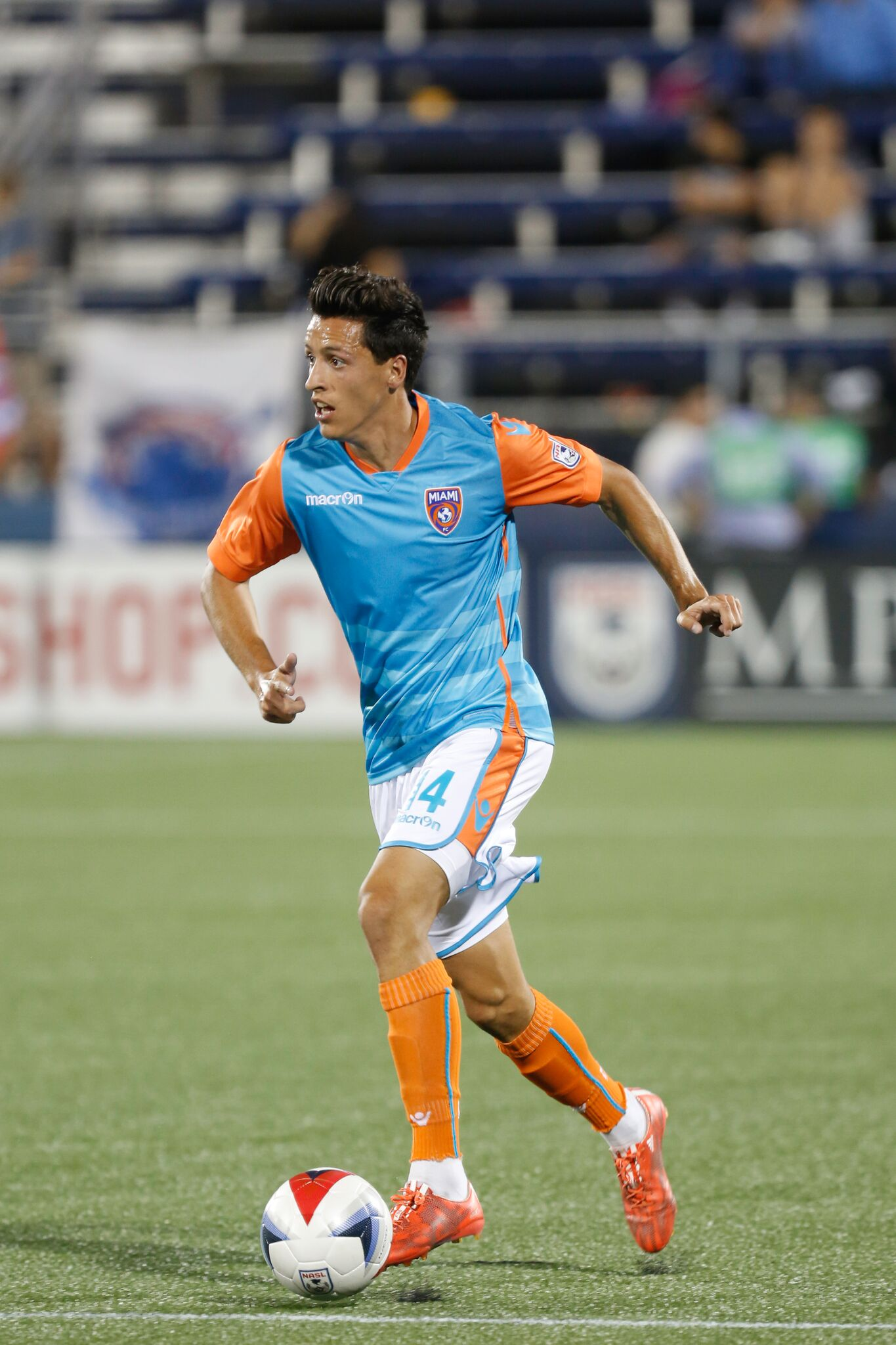

Personal information
- Full name: Robert Baggio Kcira
- Date of birth: January 9, 1994 (age 32)
- Place of birth: New York City, United States
- Height: 1.83 m (6 ft 0 in)
- Positions: Forward; midfielder

Youth career
- New York Red Bulls Academy

Senior career*
Years	Team	Apps	(Gls)
2012–2015	Wiener Neustadt	0	(0)
2012–2015	Wiener Neustadt II	25	(13)
2016–2017	Miami FC	14	(2)
2019	Miami FC	1	(0)
2021	Miami FC	24	(0)
- * Club domestic league appearances and goals as of November 4, 2021

Robert Baggio Kcira (born January 9, 1994) is an American soccer player of Albanian descent who plays as a forward or midfielder.

== Career ==
=== Youth career ===
Robert Baggio Kcira began his youth career playing in New York for Clarkstown FC's youth squad where he still holds multiple records for scoring and assists. Kcira was selected to play for the NY State Olympic Development Program (ODP). While playing for ODP, Baggio was invited to play for the U.S. Regional 1 team and then soon selected for the U.S. National Pool. From there, he joined the New York Red Bulls Academy team where he played tournaments in Barcelona, Texas, and other major venues around the globe.

=== SC Wiener Neustadt ===
Bypassing college to play soccer professionally, Baggio signed with SC Wiener Neustadt, a member of the Austrian Football Bundesliga, in 2012. It was during the 2014–2015 season where Baggio shined brightest, leading the reserve team in both goals and assists, while helping them place second in the fifth tier. He was then selected to the Starting XI of the league, an honor reserved for the most premiere players at each position.

=== Miami FC ===
In January 2016, Kcira signed professionally for North American Soccer League side Miami FC, where he was assigned the number 14 shirt. Miami FC is coached by former Italian World Cup winning defender Alessandro Nesta. After a short 2016 season in which he played 20 minutes in total, Kcira started 2017 by making 11 appearances and scoring twice for Miami as the team dominated the league (on route to winning both the Spring and Fall seasons). His first goal came against North Carolina FC on April 22, 2017, when he scored late in stoppage time to tie the game, 1-1. An ACL and meniscus injury midway through the year ended his season early.

Following the end of the 2017 season and the subsequent cancellation of the 2018 NASL season, Kcira did not return to Miami FC as the team explored options to continue play. In January 2019 it was announced the Kcira had returned to the club for its second season in the National Premier Soccer League, a semi-professional league generally considered the fourth tier of American soccer, where he made one appearance in the season opener against Miami United FC as the team went on to win a second NPSL National Championship.

Kcira remained on the roster as Miami FC returned to professional play in the newly created National Independent Soccer Association (NISA) but did not play in any of the team's Fall 2019 games.

On June 6, 2021, Kcira returned to Miami for a third stint with the team now playing in the USL Championship.

== Personal life ==
Born in New York, Kcira is of Albanian origin on his father's side. He was named after his father Frank's sporting idol, Italian former footballer Roberto Baggio.

== Career statistics ==
=== Club ===
As of match played November 4, 2021

Appearances and goals by club, season and competition
Club	Season	League			National Cup		League Cup		Continental		Total	
Club	Season	Division	Apps	Goals	Apps	Goals	Apps	Goals	Apps	Goals	Apps	Goals
Miami FC	2016	NASL	3	0	0	0	-		-		3	0
Miami FC	2017	NASL	11	2	2	0	0	0	-		13	2
Miami FC	2019	NPSL	1	0	0	0	0	0	-		1	0
Miami FC	2019	NISA	0	0	0	0	0	0	-		0	0
Miami FC	2021	USLC	24	0	-		1	0	-		25	0
Career total			39	2	2	0	1	0	-	-	42	2
