= Christiano François =

Haitian footballer (born 1993)

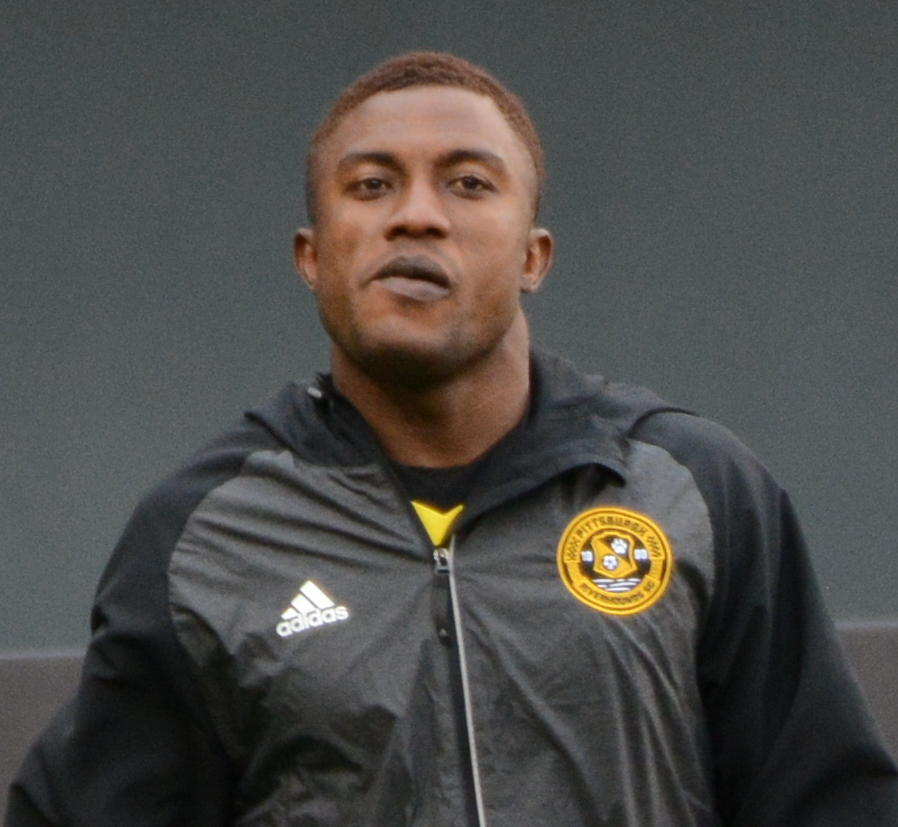
- François with Pittsburgh Riverhounds in 2018

Personal information
- Date of birth: July 17, 1993 (age 33)
- Place of birth: Cabaret, Haiti
- Height: 1.70 m (5 ft 7 in)
- Positions: Winger; forward

Youth career
- 2010–2011: Players Development Academy

College career
| Years | Team | Apps | (Gls) |
| 2012–2013 | Maryland Terrapins | 24 | (5) |

Senior career*
| Years | Team | Apps | (Gls) |
| 2011 | Central Jersey Spartans | 2 | (0) |
| 2013 | Baltimore Bohemians | 2 | (0) |
| 2014 | D.C. United | 0 | (0) |
| 2014 | → Richmond Kickers (loan) | 10 | (1) |
| 2014 | Ironbound Soul SC | 10 | (4) |
| 2015 | Vila Real | 14 | (1) |
| 2015–2016 | Felgueiras 1932 | 26 | (3) |
| 2016 | FC Motown | | |
| 2017 | Rochester Rhinos | 14 | (1) |
| 2018 | Pittsburgh Riverhounds SC | 33 | (4) |
| 2019 | Ottawa Fury | 29 | (8) |
| 2020 | Reno 1868 | 16 | (6) |
| 2021 | Miami FC | 31 | (11) |
| 2022 | El Paso Locomotive | 26 | (1) |
| 2023 | Rio Grande Valley FC | 33 | (3) |
| 2024 | Loudoun United | 21 | (0) |

International career^{‡}
| 2015 | Haiti U23 | 3 | (0) |
| 2019– | Haiti | 3 | (0) |
- * Club domestic league appearances and goals as of 31 October 2024 ‡ National team caps and goals as of 7 September 2019

Christiano François (born July 17, 1993) is a Haitian professional footballer who plays as a winger for the Haiti national team.

== Career ==
=== Early career ===
François came to the United States following the 2010 Haiti earthquake, playing prep soccer for two years at Saint Benedict's Preparatory School in Newark, New Jersey. He enrolled in the University of Maryland's Maryland English Institute and formed a close bond with fellow Haitian Widner Saint-Cyr. Following a freshman season where he scored 5 goals in 24 games for the Terrapins, François was forced to redshirt his sophomore year due to academic reasons.

=== D.C. United ===
After two years at Maryland, François decided to leave college early and sign a contract with Major League Soccer. He was claimed by D.C. United via the Waiver Draft on January 24, 2014. On March 25, François was loaned to USL Pro affiliate club Richmond Kickers He made his professional debut on April 5 in a 3–1 victory over the Pittsburgh Riverhounds.

On August 8, 2014; he was recalled from Richmond and released by D.C. United.

On January 21, 2015, he signed with SC Vila Real as a forward and right-wing midfielder.

In August 2015 he signed with Felgueiras 1932.

=== FC Motown ===
During 2016, François made appearances with New Jersey amateur side FC Motown.

=== Rochester Rhinos ===
On March 21, 2017, he signed with USL side Rochester Rhinos.

=== Ottawa Fury ===
Following a season with Pittsburgh Riverhounds, François signed with Ottawa Fury FC of the USL Championship on December 3, 2018.

=== Miami FC ===
On January 18, 2021, François signed with USL Championship side Miami FC.

=== El Paso Locomotive FC ===
François joined El Paso Locomotive in the USL Championship's Western Conference on 8 February 2022. He made 26 league appearances, scoring one goal and assisting another, before departing the club following the expiry of his contract.

=== Rio Grande Valley FC Toros ===
On January 27, 2023, François signed with Rio Grande Valley FC.

=== Loudoun United FC ===
François joined Loudoun United on 15 December 2023.

== International career ==
François made his debut for Haiti national football team on 7 September 2019 in a CONCACAF Nations League game against Curaçao, he replaced Derrick Etienne in the 78th minute.
