= Richard Ballard =

American soccer player

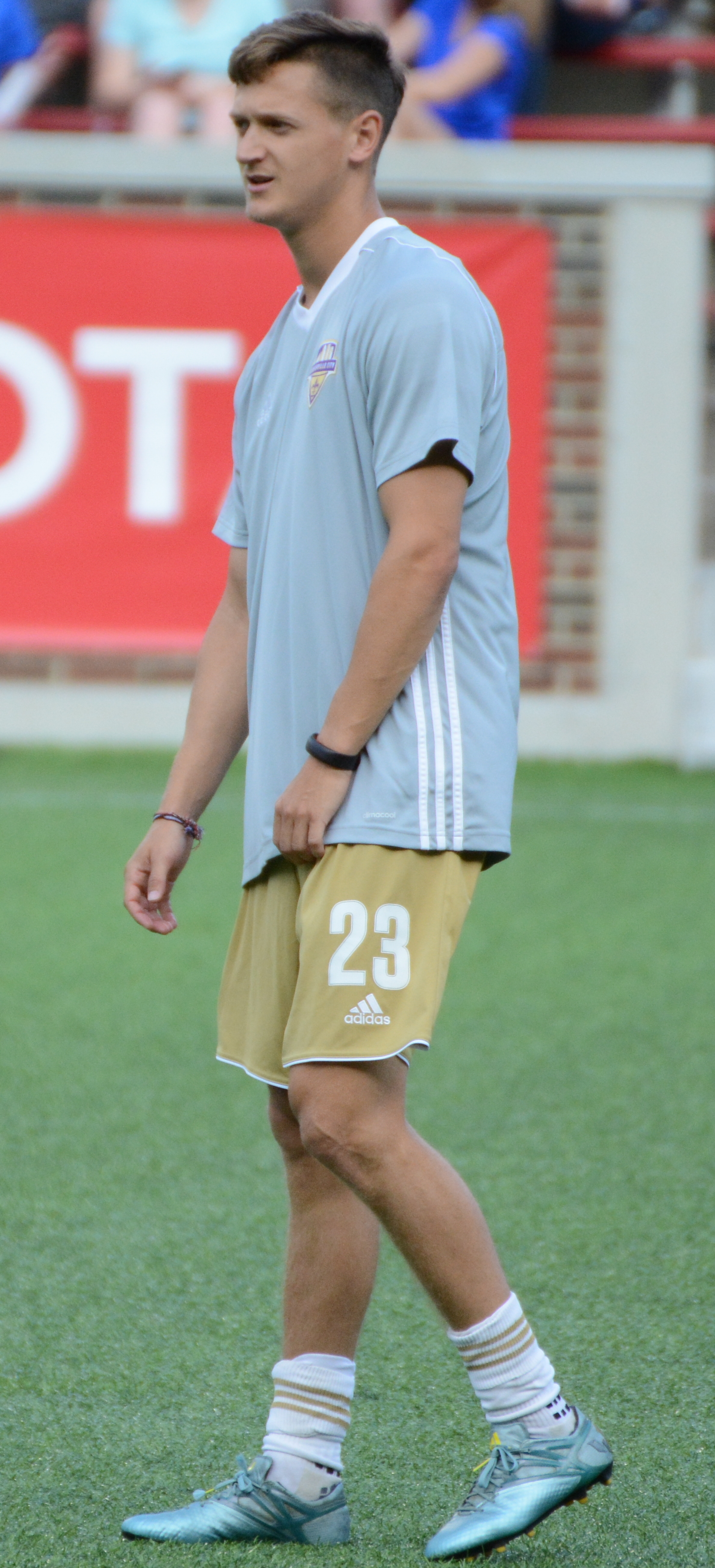
- Ballard with Louisville City in 2017

Personal information
- Date of birth: 26 January 1994 (age 32)
- Place of birth: Louisville, Kentucky, United States
- Height: 1.78 m (5 ft 10 in)
- Positions: Midfielder; forward

Youth career
- –2011: duPont Manual Crimsons

College career
Years	Team	Apps	(Gls)
2012–2016	Indiana Hoosiers	64	(5)

Senior career*
Years	Team	Apps	(Gls)
2013–2014	River City Rovers	17	(2)
2017–2019	Louisville City	33	(4)
2021–2022	Miami FC	32	(0)
2023	Detroit City	24	(0)
2024	One Knoxville	15	(0)
- * Club domestic league appearances and goals as of November 22, 2024

Richard Ballard (born January 26, 1994) is an American soccer player who plays as a forward.

== Early life ==
=== Personal ===
Ballard was born in Louisville, Kentucky to John and Debi Ballard, and attended high school at duPont Manual High School. While at Manual he played three years of varsity soccer. As a senior he scored 21 goals with 24 assists while leading Manual to the district 12 title and be named to both the All-District and All-State First teams.

=== College and youth ===
Ballard played four years of college soccer at Indiana University between 2012 and 2016, including a red-shirted year in 2013. During his freshman year Ballard appeared in 13 matches, starting four, and was named to the Big Ten Conference All Freshman team. Ballard and Indiana won the 2012 NCAA Division I Men's Soccer Championship. Over the next two seasons he appear in 30 matches for Indiana scoring one goal as a junior. As a senior he started all 21 of Indiana's matches with four goals and 2 assists while being named to the All-Big Ten second team.

While at college, Ballard appeared for Premier Development League side River City Rovers in 2012 and 2013.

== Club career ==
=== Louisville City ===
==== 2017 season ====
Ballard signed with United Soccer League side Louisville City on February 6 and made his professional debut on March 25 against Saint Louis. He appeared in 25 of Louisville's 32 league matches, being used primarily as a substitute, scoring three goals. He also appeared in both of Louisville's US Open Cup matches, scoring one goal as well as all four of Louisville' USL Cup Playoff matches. Although he didn't score in regulation time during any of the USL Cup matches, he converted the final shot of the Penalty shoot-out in the Eastern Conference final against New York Red Bulls II. Ballard and Louisville won the USL Cup Final against Swope Park with Ballard being named a finalist for USL Rookie of the Year.

==== 2018 season ====
Ballard had his contract renewed with Louisville and he made his season debut on March 17 against USL expansion side Nashville SC. In early April Ballard suffered a stress fracture causing him to miss significant time. He finished the year making only four appearances across Louisville's 34 league matches without scoring a goal. Although he didn't make an appearance in any of Louisville's four USL Cup playoff matches Ballard and Louisville went on to win the USL Cup Final against Phoenix.

=== Miami FC ===
On January 14, 2021, following a year off from competitive play, Ballard signed with USL Championship side Miami FC.

=== Detroit City ===
On January 10, 2023, Ballard signed a two-year deal with USL Championship side Detroit City. He left Detroit following their 2023 season.

=== One Knoxville ===
Ballard joined USL League One club One Knoxville on January 11, 2024. He was released by Knoxville following their 2024 season.

== Honors ==
=== Club ===
Louisville City FC

- USL Cup (2): 2017, 2018
