= Bolu Akinyode =

Nigerian footballer (born 1994)

Boluwatife Akinyode
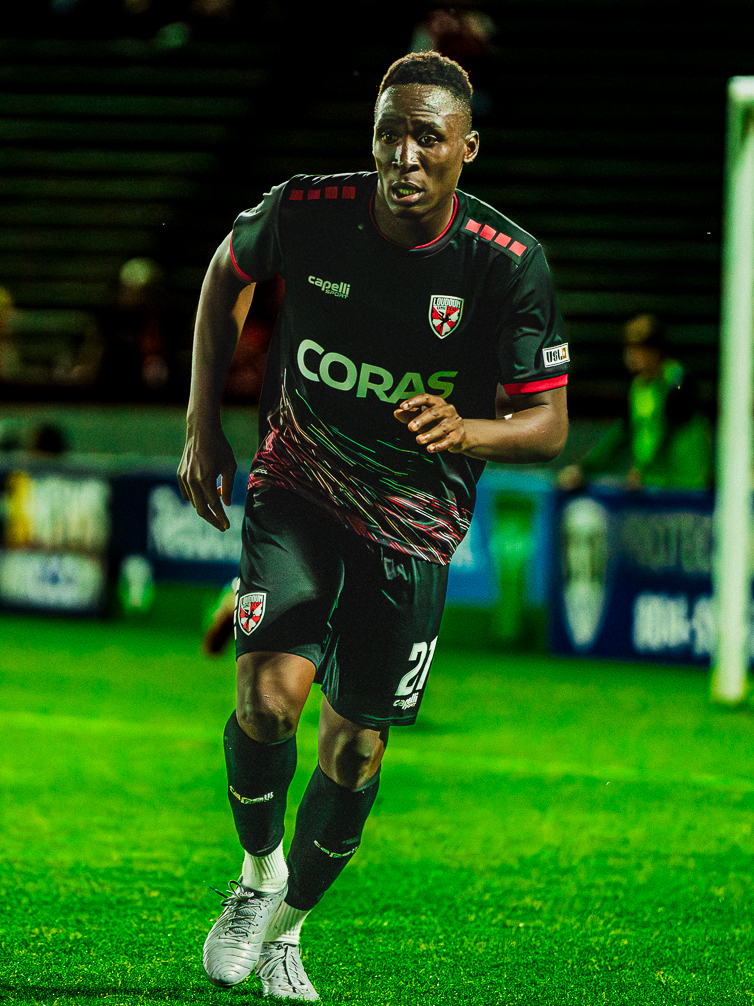
- Akiinyode with Loudoun United FC in 2026

Personal information
- Date of birth: 30 May 1994 (age 32)
- Place of birth: Lagos, Nigeria
- Height: 1.87 m (6 ft 1 1/2 in)
- Positions: Defender; defensive midfielder

Team information
- Current team: Loudoun United
- Number: 21

Youth career
- 2009–2011: New York Red Bulls

College career
Years	Team	Apps	(Gls)
2011–2014	Seton Hall Pirates		

Senior career*
Years	Team	Apps	(Gls)
2011–2013	New York Red Bulls U-23		
2014	NJ-LUSO Parma	10	(1)
2015	New York Red Bulls II	20	(1)
2016	Bethlehem Steel FC	26	(0)
2017	North Carolina FC	22	(0)
2018–2019	Nashville SC	61	(2)
2020	Birmingham Legion	15	(0)
2021–2023	Miami FC	92	(2)
2024	El Paso Locomotive	30	(0)
2025	Miami FC	21	(0)
2025–	Loudoun United	32	(1)
- * Club domestic league appearances and goals as of 31 October 2026

Boluwatife Akinyode(born 30 May 1994) is a Nigerian professional footballer who plays as a center back for Loudoun United in the USL Championship.

== Career ==
=== Youth and college ===
Born in Lagos, Nigeria, Akinyode moved to the United States and joined the New York Red Bulls Academy. He captained the U-16 Academy team and was a member of the under-18 and under-23 squads. Akinyode also played college soccer for Seton Hall University from 2011 to 2014. While with the Pirates the holding midfielder played in 63 matches scoring 5 goals and recording 4 assists.

He also played in the Premier Development League for NJ-LUSO Parma.

=== Professional ===
Akinyode signed with New York Red Bulls II on April 18, 2015. He made his debut for the club on the same day, appearing as a second-half substitute in a 1-1 draw against the Charleston Battery. On September 5, 2015 Akinyode scored his goal as a professional, scoring the winning goal on a late header in a 3-2 victory over Louisville City FC.

On December 11, 2015, Akinyode signed with Bethlehem Steel FC.

On January 30, 2017, North Carolina FC announced they had signed Akinyode.

On January 4, 2018, Akinyode signed with USL side Nashville SC.

On December 17, 2019, Akinyode joined Birmingham Legion FC.

On January 15, 2021, Akinyode signed with USL Championship side Miami FC.

Akinyode signed with USL Championship side El Paso Locomotive on 6 November 2023 ahead of their 2024 season.

Akinyode returned to Miami FC in January 2025. Akinyode and Miami FC mutually agreed to part ways on 4 September 2025.

=== International ===
Akinyode has represented Nigeria at the U-14 national team level. In 2012 Akinyode was called up for a United States men's national under-20 soccer team training camp by Tab Ramos.
