= Connor Sparrow =

American soccer player (born 1994)

Personal information
- Date of birth: May 10, 1994 (age 32)
- Place of birth: St. Louis, Missouri, United States
- Height: 1.88 m (6 ft 2 in)
- Position: Goalkeeper

College career
Years	Team	Apps	(Gls)
2012	UMKC Kangaroos	15	(0)
2013–2015	Creighton Bluejays	51	(0)

Senior career*
Years	Team	Apps	(Gls)
2014–2015	IMG Academy Bradenton	14	(0)
2016–2017	Real Monarchs	18	(0)
2017–2018	Real Salt Lake	0	(0)
2017–2018	→ Real Monarchs (loan)	12	(0)
2019	Nashville SC	9	(0)
2020	Chicago Fire	1	(0)
2021–2022	Miami FC	54	(0)
2023	Tampa Bay Rowdies	30	(0)
- * Club domestic league appearances and goals as of January 25, 2025

Connor Sparrow (born May 10, 1994) is an American soccer player.

== Career ==
=== College and amateur ===
Sparrow began his college soccer career at the University of Missouri–Kansas City in 2012, before transferring to Creighton University.

While at college, Sparrow played with Premier Development League side IMG Academy Bradenton in 2014 and 2015.

=== Professional ===
On January 19, 2016, Sparrow was selected in the fourth round (65th overall) of the 2016 MLS SuperDraft by Real Salt Lake. He signed with Salt Lake's United Soccer League affiliate Real Monarchs on March 18, 2016.

On September 11, 2017, Sparrow moved to the Monarchs' parent club Real Salt Lake.

On December 13, 2018, Sparrow signed with USL club Nashville SC.

Sparrow moved back to MLS on January 20, 2020, joining Chicago Fire. He was released by Chicago at the end of the 2020 season.

On January 21, 2021, Sparrow signed with USL Championship club Miami FC.

On December 23, 2022, it was announced that Sparrow would be a Tampa Bay Rowdies player for their 2023 season.

In June 2023, Sparrow was nominated as a top 5 goalkeeper in the USL.
