= Jahshaun Anglin =

Jamaican footballer (born 2001)

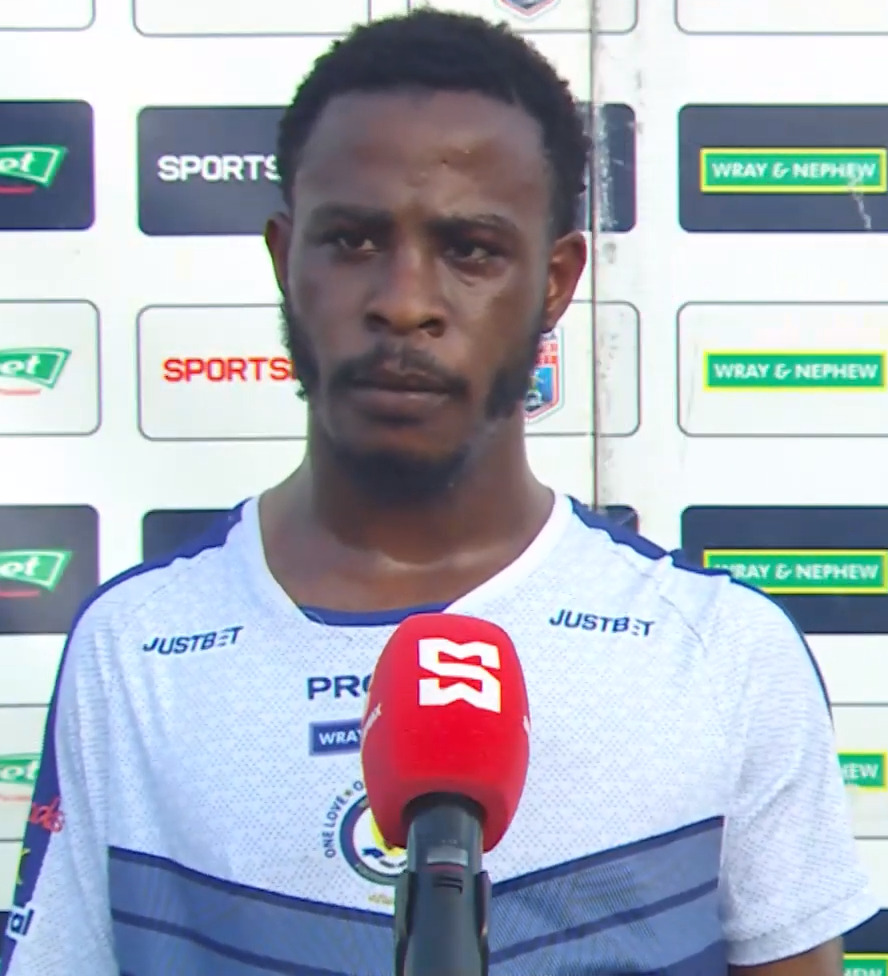
- Anglin in 2025

Personal information
- Full name: Jahshaun Mustaf Anglin
- Date of birth: 6 May 2001 (age 25)
- Place of birth: Kingston, Jamaica
- Height: 1.78 m (5 ft 10 in)
- Position: Midfielder

Team information
- Current team: Mount Pleasant Football Academy

Senior career*
Years	Team	Apps	(Gls)
2019–2020	Harbour View	21	(2)
2021	Miami FC	15	(0)
2022–2024	Harbour View	48	(0)
2024–	Mount Pleasant Football Academy	37	(3)

International career^{‡}
2020–	Jamaica	12	(0)
- * Club domestic league appearances and goals as of 5 October 2025 ‡ National team caps and goals as of 10 October 2025

Jahshaun Mustaf Anglin (born 6 May 2001) is a Jamaican footballer for the Jamaica national team.

== Career ==
=== Club ===
Anglin plays for Harbour View F.C. in Jamaica.

On 29 January 2021, Anglin made a jump to the United States and signed with Miami FC of the second division USL Championship.

In April 2022, Anglin rejoined Harbour View in the JPL.

In August 2024, Anglin signed with Mount Pleasant Football Academy and recorded his first goal for the club in their second match of the season.

=== International ===
Anglin was called up to the Jamaica senior team for a friendly against Bermuda on 10 March 2020. He made his international debut the next day, coming on as a substitute for Peter-Lee Vassell in the 58th minute as Jamaica won the match 2–0.

== Personal life ==
On 28 September 2021 Anglin was arrested for allegedly sexually assaulting a woman on the campus of Florida International University, where Miami FC play home matches, in University Park, Florida. He was later charged with one count of sexual battery.

== Career statistics ==
=== International ===
As of match played 10 October 2025

Appearances and goals by national team and year
National team	Year	Apps	Goals
Jamaica	2020	3	0
Jamaica	2023	2	0
Jamaica	2024	1	0
Jamaica	2025	6	0
Total		12	0

== Honors ==
=== Harbor View ===
- Jamaica Premier League: 2022
