= Michael Knapp =

American soccer player

Personal information
- Full name: Michael Knapp
- Date of birth: January 30, 2000 (age 26)
- Place of birth: Bloomfield, New Jersey, United States
- Height: 5 ft 11 in (1.80 m)
- Position: Midfielder

Youth career
- 2016–2017: Cedar Stars Academy
- 2017–2018: New York Red Bulls

College career
Years	Team	Apps	(Gls)
2018–2019	Montclair Red Hawks	35	(3)

Senior career*
Years	Team	Apps	(Gls)
2018	New York Red Bulls U-23	1	(0)
2019	FC Motown	5	(0)
2020–2021	Morris Elite	0	(0)
2021–2022	New York Red Bulls II	43	(0)
2023	Rio Grande Valley	7	(1)
2024–	Chattanooga Red Wolves	31	(3)
- * Club domestic league appearances and goals as of October 31, 2026

Michael Knapp (born January 30, 2000) is an American professional soccer player who plays as a midfielder. He is currently a free agent after recently playing for USL League One side Chattanooga Red Wolves.

== Club career ==
Born in Bloomfield, New Jersey, Knapp played prep soccer at Bloomfield High School and began his career with the Cedar Stars Academy before joining the youth academy at the New York Red Bulls in 2017. On July 15, 2018, Knapp played in one match for the New York Red Bulls U-23 in the Premier Development League against the Ocean City Nor'easters, coming on as a late substitute during the 1–2 defeat.

In the fall of 2018, Knapp began attending Montclair State University and playing college soccer for the Montclair Red Hawks. He made his collegiate debut on August 31, 2018, against SUNY Oneonta. He ended his first season starting in all 17 matches for the Red Hawks and earning the New Jersey Athletic Conference Rookie of the Year award.

During Knapp's sophomore season, he scored his first Red Hawks goal on August 31, 2019, against the St. Joseph's-Brooklyn Bears and scored a goal each in two conference matches against the William Paterson Pioneers and TCNJ Lions. He played in 18 matches that season, scoring the 3 goals, and earned the NJAC Midfielder of the Year award.

=== New York Red Bulls II ===
On November 13, 2020, Knapp signed with USL League Two club Morris Elite, however, on April 23, 2021, it was announced that Knapp had signed with USL Championship side New York Red Bulls II, the reserve side of the New York Red Bulls. He made his professional debut for the club on April 30 against Hartford Athletic, starting in a 2–3 defeat.

=== Austin FC ===
On January 11, 2022, Knapp was drafted by MLS side Austin FC.

=== Rio Grande Valley FC ===
Knapp joined Rio Grande Valley FC of USL Championship on January 26, 2023.

=== Chattanooga Red Wolves ===
On July 19, 2024, Knapp signed with USL League One side Chattanooga Red Wolves.

== Career statistics ==
As of match played October 14, 2023

Appearances and goals by club, season and competition
Club	Season	League			Cup		Playoffs		Total	
Club	Season	Division	Apps	Goals	Apps	Goals	Apps	Goals	Apps	Goals
New York Red Bulls U-23	2018	Premier Development League	1	0	0	0	0	0	1	0
FC Motown	2019	National Premier Soccer League	5	0	0	0	3	1	8	1
New York Red Bulls II	2021	USL Championship|	22	0	—		—		22	0
New York Red Bulls II	2022	USL Championship|	21	0	—		—		21	0
Rio Grande Valley FC	2023	USL Championship|	7	1	—		—		7	1
Career total			56	1	0	0	3	1	59	2

== Honors ==
Individual

- 2018 NJAC Rookie of the Year
- 2019 NJAC Midfielder of the Year
