= Pierre da Silva =

American soccer player (born 1998)

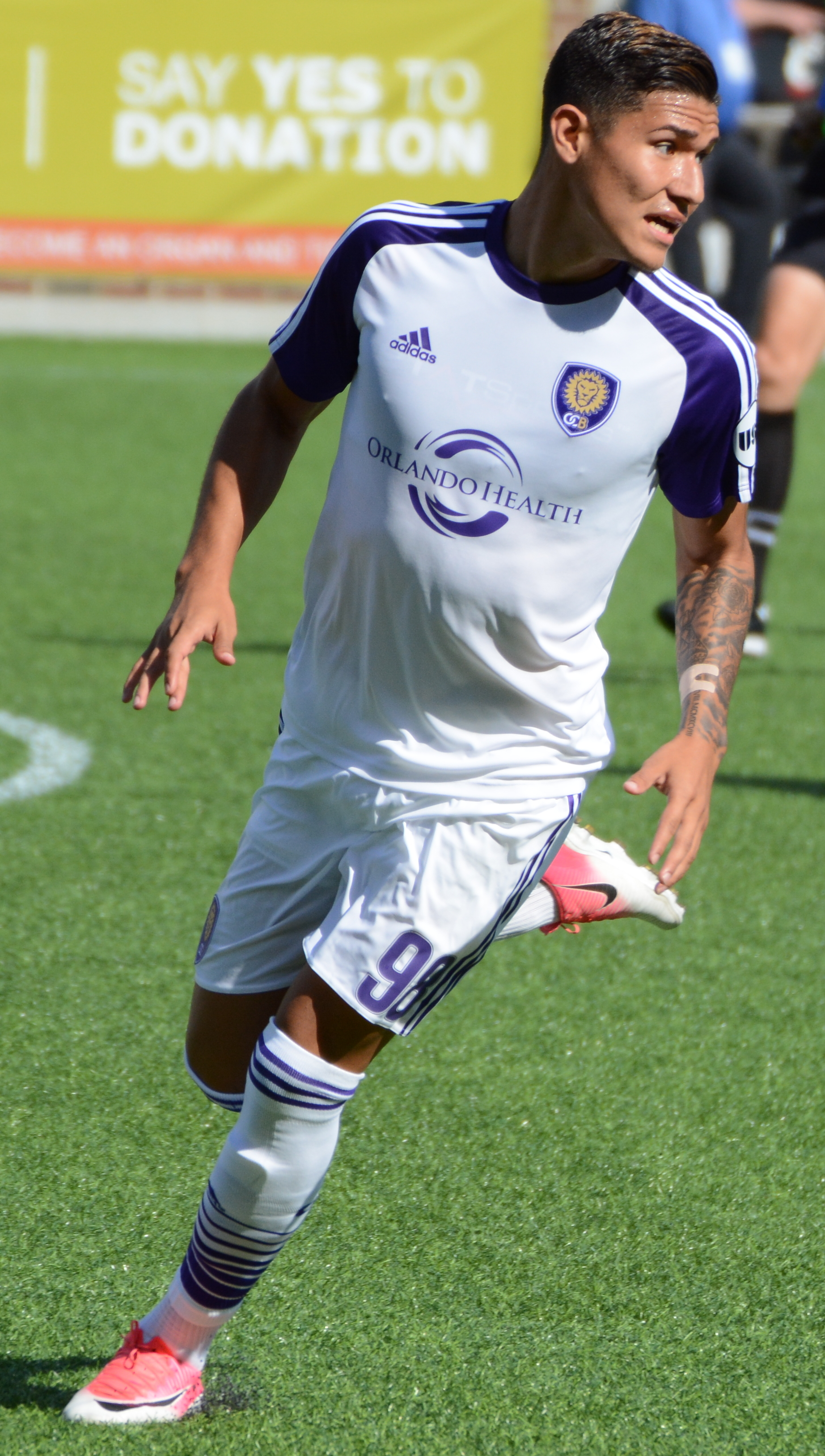
- da Silva playing with Orlando City B in 2017

Personal information
- Full name: Pierre da Silva
- Date of birth: July 28, 1998 (age 28)
- Place of birth: Port Chester, New York, U.S.
- Height: 5 ft 9 in (1.75 m)
- Positions: Winger; forward

Team information
- Current team: Brooklyn FC

Youth career
- 2003–2012: Port Chester SC
- 2014–2016: New York SC
- 2016: Orlando City

Senior career*
Years	Team	Apps	(Gls)
2016–2017	Orlando City B	48	(5)
2017–2019	Orlando City	3	(0)
2018	→ Saint Louis FC (loan)	4	(1)
2019	→ Athletico Paranaense (loan)	0	(0)
2019–2020	Memphis 901	15	(1)
2021–2022	Miami FC	38	(4)
2023	Forward Madison	12	(1)
2024	Cesar Vallejo	26	(1)
2025–2026	Cusco	32	(2)
2026–	Brooklyn FC	12	(0)

International career^{‡}
2013–2015	United States U17	26	(3)
2016	United States U19	6	(1)
- * Club domestic league appearances and goals as of November 4, 2026 ‡ National team caps and goals as of July 19, 2016

Pierre da Silva (born July 28, 1998) is an American soccer player who plays as a forward for USL Championship club Brooklyn.

== Career ==
He was acquired by Orlando City B in January 2016.

He signed an MLS contract with Orlando City in January 2017. On March 24, 2017, he was sent on a season-long loan to Orlando City B. During the 2017 USL season, da Silva was ranked the No. 1 player in the United Soccer League's "20 Under 20" list.

On March 2, 2018, da Silva was suspended for three games for use of offensive language during a preseason scrimmage.

On May 24, 2018, he was loaned to Saint Louis FC, reuniting him with OCB head coach Anthony Pulis. He featured in one game versus Colorado Springs Switchbacks FC before returning. On July 18, da Silva returned to Saint Louis for a second time. He scored a 79th-minute equalizer in a 2–2 draw with Orange County SC in his first game back.

On March 18, 2019, da Silva joined Orlando's Brazilian partner club Athletico Paranaense on loan for the season. On July 31, 2019, da Silva and Orlando City mutually agreed to part ways.

Following his release from Orlando, da Silva joined USL Championship side Memphis 901.

On January 14, 2021, da Silva was signed by USL Championship side Miami FC.

da Silva was signed by Forward Madison FC of USL League One on August 8, 2023, for the remainder of their 2023 season.

== International ==
He was in the United States U17 squad for the 2015 FIFA U-17 World Cup and made one appearance in the opening group game against Nigeria.

He is also eligible to play for Brazil through his father and Peru through his mother.

== Career statistics ==
=== Club ===
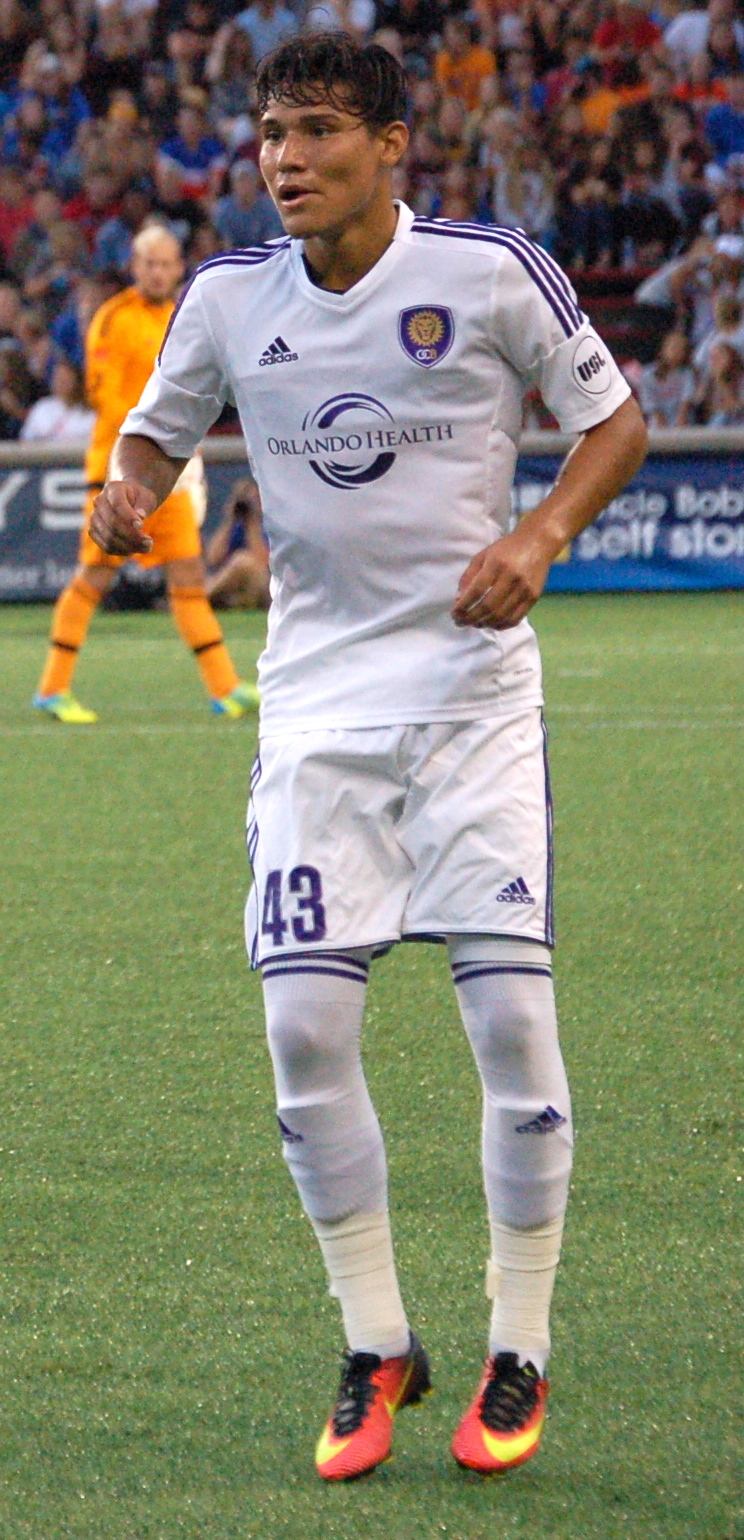
da Silva playing with Orlando City B in 2016

As of October 3, 2020

Club	Season	League			Open Cup		Continental		League Playoffs		Total	
Club	Season	Division	Apps	Goals	Apps	Goals	Apps	Goals	Apps	Goals	Apps	Goals
Orlando City	2017	MLS	1	0	1	0	—		0	0	2	0
Orlando City	2018	MLS	2	0	0	0	—		0	0	2	0
Orlando City	2019	MLS	0	0	0	0	—		0	0	0	0
Orlando City	Total		3	0	1	0	—		0	0	4	0
Orlando City B	2016	USL	22	2	—		—		1	0	23	2
Orlando City B	2017	USL	26	3	—		—		0	0	26	3
Orlando City B	Total		48	5	—		—		1	0	49	5
Saint Louis FC (loan)	2018	USL	4	1	0	0	—		0	0	4	1
Athletico Paranaense (loan)	2019	Série A	0	0	0	0	0	0	0	0	0	0
Memphis 901	2019	USL Championship	11	1	0	0	—		0	0	11	1
Memphis 901	2020	USL Championship	4	0	—		—		0	0	4	0
Memphis 901	Total		15	1	—		—		0	0	15	1
Career Totals			70	7	1	0	0	0	1	0	72	7
