= Boca Raton FC =

- Full name: Boca Raton Football Club
- Nicknames: Boca Raton FC, BRFC, the Pirates
- Founded: 2015; 11 years ago
- Stadium: Atlantic Community High School
- Capacity: 5,000
- Owner: Heizer Unlimited
- Chairman: Douglas Heizer
- Coach: Fernando Valenzuela
- League: National Premier Soccer League
- Website: www.bocaratonfc.com

Boca Raton Football Club is an American soccer club that started playing in the National Premier Soccer League (NPSL). In 2015, which was their inaugural season, they were only defeated in one game and won the APSL championship and the APSL fall tournament. The club currently plays in the PASL (Premier American Soccer League) and the FGCL (Florida Gold Coast League).

== History ==
In 2013, the club was given the rights to a National Premier Soccer League franchise for Palm Beach County, Florida. The initial plans for the team fell through at the last minute and the NPSL franchise was put on hiatus for two years.

APSL awarded Boca Raton a franchise and the club was officially announced on January 20, 2015. On May 2, 2015, 2,130 fans at Boca Raton High School saw South Florida FC defeated 4–1.

Boca Raton went on a 9-game win streak to take both the 2015 APSL regular season title and championship.

Boca Raton FC began NPSL Sunshine Conference play in May 2017.

After a year-long break in 2020 due to COVID-19, Boca Raton FC started competing again in the FGCL and the PASL in 2021, with participation confirmed for the NPSL season as well.

== Coaching staff ==
=== Current coaching staff ===
Role	Name
Head coach	(United States) Fernando Valenzuela
Associate Coach	(United States) Paul Godoy
Associate Coach	(Brazil) Pedro Mancebo
Goalkeeping Coach	(Venezuela) Ronald Garces

=== Former head coaches ===
Name	Nation	Tenure
Marcelo Castillo	CAN	2015– 2016 US Open Cup
Pedro Yunes	ECU	2016
Athirson Mazzoli e Oliveira	BRA	2017

== Year-by-year ==
=== Results ===
Year	Name	Division	League	Reg. season	Playoffs	Avg. attendance
2015	Spring Season	4	American Premier Soccer League	1st	Champions	860
2015	Fall Season	4	American Premier Soccer League	1st	Champions	
2016	Lamar Hunt U.S. Open Cup		United States Soccer Federation	First Round		
2016	Spring Season	4	American Premier Soccer League	3rd	Champions	720
2016	Fall Season	4	American Premier Soccer League	2nd	Champions	
2017	Lamar Hunt U.S. Open Cup		United States Soccer Federation	First Round		
2017	Spring Season	4	American Premier Soccer League	5th	Semifinals	680
2017	Sunshine Conference	4	National Premier Soccer League	6th		420
2018	Spring Season	4	American Premier Soccer League		Semifinals	
2018	Sunshine Conference	4	National Premier Soccer League	5th		360
2019	Southeast Conference	4	United Premier Soccer League		Semifinal	
2019	South Florida Division	4	United Premier Soccer League	4th	Champions	
2021	North Division	4	Florida Gold Coast League	3rd		
2021	Sunshine Conference	4	National Premier Soccer League	4th	Semifinal	
2022	North Division	4	Florida Gold Coast League	1st	Runner-up	

== Honors ==
=== APSL ===
- 2015 Regular Season Champion
- 2015 Season Champion
- 2015 Regular Fall Champion
- 2015 Fall Champion
- 2016 Season Champion
- 2016 Fall Season Champion

=== United Premier Soccer League ===
- 2019 Spring Season South Florida Champion
- 2019 Spring Season Florida Second Place

== Team kit ==
Boca Raton FC has its primary colors as Baby and Navy Blue. Their away uniform is all white.

- Home Colors: Baby and Navy Blue
- Away Colors: White
