= 2020 Charleston Battery season =

Charleston Battery
2020 season
- President: Andrew Bell
- Head coach: Michael Anhaeuser
- Stadium: Patriots Point Soccer Complex
- USL Championship: Group H: 2nd Conference: 5th Overall: 8th
- USL Playoffs: Conf. Semifinals
- U.S. Open Cup: Cancelled
- Average home league attendance: 201
- Biggest win: CHS 3–0 ATL (July 24); NC 0–3 CHS (Aug. 19)
- Biggest defeat: CHS 0–2 TBR (July 31)
Home colors	Away colors	Third colors

The 2020 Charleston Battery season was the club's 28th year of existence, their 17th season in the second tier of the United States soccer league system. It was their tenth season in the USL Championship (USLC) as part of the Eastern Conference. This article covers the period from November 18, 2019, the day after the 2019 USLC Playoff Final, to the conclusion of the 2020 USLC Playoff Final, scheduled for November 12–16, 2020. The season was interrupted by the COVID-19 pandemic in March and later resumed in July. This was the first season in which the Battery played at Patriots Point Soccer Complex.

== Roster ==
As of March 5, 2020

Note: Flags indicate national team as defined under FIFA eligibility rules; some limited exceptions apply. Players may hold more than one non-FIFA nationality.

No.	Pos.	Nation	Player
0	GK	USA	Darian McCauley
1	GK	USA	Phil Breno
3	DF	USA	Kyle Nelson
4	DF	JAM	Rennico Clarke
5	DF	TTO	Leland Archer
6	MF	SCO	Robbie Crawford
7	MF	USA	Nico Rittmeyer
8	MF	PAN	Romario Piggott
9	FW	RSA	Arthur Bosua
10	FW	BER	Zeiko Lewis
11	FW	JAM	Nicque Daley
12	DF	BLZ	Deshawon Nembhard
13	MF	VEN	Mauro Cichero
14	DF	USA	Jarad van Schaik
15	DF	NGR	Temi Adesodun
17	DF	USA	Logan Gdula
18	FW	USA	Jesus Ibarra
19	MF	USA	Dante Marini
20	DF	GRN	A. J. Paterson
21	MF	HON	Angelo Kelly-Rosales
26	MF	TTO	Kierron Mason
30	MF	USA	James Cox
—	GK	USA	Paul Lewis

USL Academy player

== Competitions ==
=== Exhibitions ===
February 5 Preseason 1	Charleston Battery	2–3	Minnesota United FC	Melbourne, Florida
11:00 AM EDT	Lewis 5', 19'	Report; Report	Dotson 9'; Lod 25'; Chacón	Stadium: Titan Soccer Complex

February 7 Preseason 2	Inter Miami CF	v	Charleston Battery	Fort Lauderdale, Florida
TBD EDT				Stadium: Inter Miami CF Training Complex
Note: Result not published.

February 12 Preseason 3	Charleston Battery	1–0	Coastal Carolina Chanticleers	Mount Pleasant, South Carolina
7:00 PM EDT	Daley 87'	Report		Stadium: Patriots Point Soccer Complex

February 15 Preseason 4	Greenville Triumph SC	1–0	Charleston Battery	Greenville, South Carolina
2:00 PM EDT	Walker 16' (pen.)	Report		Stadium: Legacy Early College Field

February 19 Preseason 5	Charleston Battery	v	Greenville Triumph SC	Mount Pleasant, South Carolina
2:00 PM EDT		Canceled		Stadium: Patriots Point Soccer Complex

February 25 Preseason 6	Charleston Battery	4–1	Chattanooga Red Wolves SC	Mount Pleasant, South Carolina
10:00 AM EDT	Piggott 14'; Clarke 42'; Bosua 70', 78'	Report	23' (pen.) <	Stadium: Patriots Point Soccer Complex; Attendance: 0
Note: Closed door scrimmage

February 28 Preseason 7	Tormenta FC	1–1	Charleston Battery	Statesboro, Georgia
7:00 PM EDT	Goal		Daley	Stadium: Erk Russell Park

=== USL Championship ===
==== Standings — Group H ====
Pos	Team	Pld	W	D	L	GF	GA	GD	Pts	PPG	Qualification
1	Tampa Bay Rowdies	16	10	3	3	25	11	+14	33	2.06	Advance to USL Championship Playoffs
2	Charleston Battery	15	9	3	3	26	15	+11	30	2.00	Advance to USL Championship Playoffs
3	Miami FC	16	4	4	8	20	34	−14	16	1.00	
4	Atlanta United 2	16	3	3	10	23	33	−10	12	0.75	

Source: USL

==== Match results ====
On December 20, 2019, the USL announced the 2020 season schedule, creating the following fixture list for the early part of Charleston's season. In the preparations for the resumption of league play following the shutdown prompted by the coronavirus pandemic, Charleston's schedule was announced on July 2.

March 8 1	Atlanta United 2	0–1	Charleston Battery	Kennesaw, Georgia
3:30 PM EDT	Bashti (yellow card) 57'	Report	Kelly-Rosales (yellow card) 21'; Gdula (yellow card) 40'; Lewis 63' (pen.)	Stadium: Fifth Third Bank Stadium; Attendance: 851; Referee: Elvis Osmanovic

July 19 2	Charleston Battery	1–2	Birmingham Legion FC	Mount Pleasant, South Carolina
TBA PM CDT	Lewis 29'; Daley (yellow card) 51'	Report	Wright 12'; Crognale (yellow card) 40'; Rufe (yellow card) 45+1'; Cromwell (yellow card) 48'; Lapa 54'; Akinyode (yellow card) 82'; Servania (yellow card) 90+1'	Stadium: Patriots Point Soccer Complex; Referee: Kevin Broadley

July 24 3	Charleston Battery	3–0	Atlanta United 2	Mount Pleasant
8:00 PM EDT	Nembhard (yellow card) 10'; Daley 20'; Rittmeyer 49'; Crawford (yellow card) 55'; Bosua 90+9'	Report	Diop (red card) 81'	Stadium: Patriots Point Soccer Complex; Referee: Izlen Peksenar

July 31 4	Tampa Bay Rowdies	2–0	Charleston Battery	St. Petersburg, Florida
7:30 PM EDT	Lasso (yellow card) 31'; Guenzatti 40'; Fernandes (yellow card) 68'; Johnson 88'	Report	Gdula (yellow card) 3'; Zarokostas (yellow card) 43' van Schaik (yellow card) 63' (yellow-red card) 81'	Stadium: Al Lang Stadium; Referee: Jonathan Bilinski

August 5 5	Atlanta United 2	1–1	Charleston Battery	Kennesaw, Georgia
7:30 PM EDT	Jadama (yellow card) 27'; Gannon (yellow card) 36'; Macky Diop 67'; Goodrum (yellow card) 73'	Report	Paterson (yellow card) 38'; Archer (yellow card) 45'; Kelly-Rosales (yellow card) 86'; Cichero 90+4'	Stadium: Fifth Third Bank Stadium; Referee: Chris Ruska

August 8 6	Charlotte Independence	1–1	Charleston Battery	Matthews, North Carolina
7:00 PM EDT	Etou (yellow card) 15'; Kelly 38'; Haakenson (yellow card) 90+4'	Report	Maund 42' (o.g.); Clarke (red card) 85'	Stadium: Sportsplex at Matthews; Referee: Sergii Demianchuk

August 15 7	Charleston Battery	3–2	Atlanta United 2	Mount Pleasant
8:00 PM EDT	van Schaik (yellow card) 25'; Cichero 57'; Lewis 59', 90+1'; Archer (yellow card) 90+4'	Report	Macky Diop 6'; Reilly (yellow card) 32'; Morales 51'; Gurr (yellow card) 62'	Stadium: Patriots Point Soccer Complex; Referee: John Matto

August 19 8	North Carolina FC	0–3	Charleston Battery	Cary, North Carolina
7:00 PM EDT	Pecka (yellow card) 73'; Donovan (yellow card) 90'; Fortune (yellow card) 90+6'	Report	Kelly-Rosales (yellow card) 29'; Piggott 56'; Daley 69'; Zarokostas 81'	Stadium: WakeMed Soccer Park; Referee: John Griggs

August 26 9	Charleston Battery	3–1	Miami FC	Mount Pleasant
7:30 PM EDT	Gdula 29'; Piggott 34', (yellow card) 48'; Marini 63'	Report	Griffiths (yellow card) 44'; Ndam (yellow card) 45+2'; González 53'	Stadium: Patriots Point Soccer Complex; Attendance: 150; Referee: Izlen Peksenar

August 29 10	Charleston Battery	1–0	Tampa Bay Rowdies	Mount Pleasant
7:30 PM EDT	Zarokostas 22'; Kelly-Rosales (yellow card) 41'; Archer (yellow card) 47'	Report	Johnson (yellow card) 34'; Scarlett (yellow card) 45+3'	Stadium: Patriots Point Soccer Complex; Attendance: 203; Referee: Matthew Thompson

September 5 11	Miami FC	1–1	Charleston Battery	Miami, Florida
7:00 PM EDT	Markey (yellow card) 26'; Velásquez (yellow card) 42'; Löbe (yellow card) 67'; Granitto (yellow card) 78'; González 86'	Report	Zarokostas 49', (yellow card) 59'; Paterson (yellow card) 58'; Kelly-Rosales (yellow card) 88'; Gdula (yellow card) 89'	Stadium: Riccardo Silva Stadium; Referee: Gabriele Giusti

September 11 12	Charleston Battery	1–0	Tampa Bay Rowdies	Mount Pleasant
7:30 PM EDT	Lewis 54'; Archer (yellow card) 58'; Zarokostas (yellow card) 81'; Paterson (yellow card) 89'	Report	Oduro (yellow card) 14'	Stadium: Patriots Point Soccer Complex; Attendance: 250; Referee: Kevin Broadley

September 20 13	Charleston Battery	2–0	Miami FC	Mount Pleasant
6:00 PM EDT	Lewis 19'; Daley 44'; Zarokostas (yellow card) 76'	Report	Ndam (yellow card) 52'; Heath (yellow card) 85'	Stadium: Patriots Point Soccer Complex; Attendance: 350; Referee: Kyle Johnston

September 26 14	Charleston Battery	Cancelled	Loudoun United FC	Mount Pleasant
TBA PM EDT				Stadium: Patriots Point Soccer Complex
Note: Match cancelled due to multiple positive COVID-19 tests in Loudoun United FC organization and a lack of rescheduling windows.

September 30 15	Miami FC	4–3	Charleston Battery	Miami, Florida
TBA PM EDT	Williams (yellow card) 39', (goal) 48'; Bezecourt 60'; Velásquez 65'; González 88'; Heath (yellow card) 90+1'; Pais (yellow card) 90+4'; Saydee (yellow card) 90+6'	Report	Daley 12', 30'; Crawford (yellow card) 26', (goal) 50' van Schaik (yellow card) 60'; Lewis (yellow card) 67'	Stadium: Riccardo Silva Stadium; Referee: Johan Fredrik Roenning

October 3 16	Tampa Bay Rowdies	1–2	Charleston Battery	St. Petersburg, Florida
7:30 PM EDT	Guenzatti (yellow card) 39'; Doherty (yellow card) 43'; Lasso 62'; Najem (yellow card) 68'; Oduro (yellow card) 90'	Report	Bosua (yellow card) 14'; Nelson (yellow card) 34'; Zarokostas 57', 84', (yellow card) 87'; Marini (yellow card) 80'; Crawford (yellow card) 85'	Stadium: Al Lang Stadium; Attendance: 403; Referee: Jonathan Bilinski

==== USL Cup Playoffs ====
October 10 Conf. Quarterfinals	Charlotte Independence	1–2 (a.e.t.)	Charleston Battery	Matthews, North Carolina
7:00 PM EDT	Roberts 64'; Martínez (yellow card) 90+4'; Dimick (yellow card) 100'; Sabella (yellow card) 118'	Report	Daley 3'; Crawford (yellow card) 63'; Paterson (yellow card) 71'; Marini (yellow card) 99'; Bosua 101', (yellow card) 109'	Stadium: Sportsplex at Matthews; Attendance: 100; Referee: Lukasz Szpala

October 17 Conf. Semifinals	Tampa Bay Rowdies	1–0	Charleston Battery	St. Petersburg, Florida
7:30 PM EDT	Scarlett (yellow card) 38'; Mkosana 79'	Report	Archer (yellow card) 57'	Stadium: Al Lang Stadium; Attendance: 1,301; Referee: Ismir Pekmic
