= 2020 Tampa Bay Rowdies season =

Tampa Bay Rowdies
2020 season
- Chairman: Stuart Sternberg
- Head coach: Neill Collins
- Stadium: Al Lang Stadium
- USL Championship: 1st (Group H)
- USL Cup: Finalist
- U.S. Open Cup: Cancelled
- Top goalscorer: League: Sebastián Guenzatti (8); All: Sebastián Guenzatti (10)
- Highest home attendance: League: 403; All: 1,098
- Lowest home attendance: 140
- Average home league attendance: 218.43
- Biggest win: MIA 0–3 TBR (August 7); TBR 3–0 MIA (September 2)
- Biggest defeat: CHS 1–0 TBR (Aug. 29 & Sept. 11)
Home colors	Away colors	Third colors

The 2020 Tampa Bay Rowdies season was the club's eleventh season of existence, their fourth in the United Soccer League, and second in the USL Championship. Including the previous Tampa Bay Rowdies, this was the 27th season of a franchise in the Tampa Bay metro area with the Rowdies moniker. Including the now-defunct Tampa Bay Mutiny, this was the 33rd season of professional soccer in the Tampa Bay region.

== Club ==
=== Roster ===
As of August 5, 2020

No.	Position	Nation	Player
1	GK	USA	Evan Louro
2	DF	USA	Obafemi Awodesu
3	DF	USA	Forrest Lasso
4	MF	ENG	Lewis Hilton
5	DF	JAM	Jordan Scarlett
7	MF	FRA	Yann Ekra
8	MF	USA	Zach Steinberger
9	FW	USA	Kyle Murphy
10	MF	MEX	Kevin Mendoza
11	MF	BRA	Leo Fernandes
13	FW	URU	Sebastián Guenzatti
14	MF	CAN	Malik Johnson
16	DF	USA	Max Lachowecki
17	FW	PAN	Juan Tejada
18	MF	GHA	Dominic Oduro
19	MF	AFG	Adam Najem
21	GK	USA	Macklin Robinson
22	MF	IRL	Jordan Doherty
23	MF	DEN	Sebastian Dalgaard
24	DF	SLE	Mustapha Dumbuya
25	GK	USA	Ian McGrane
26	MF	USA	Hayden Morgan
27	FW	USA	Landon Ameres
28	MF	USA	Julio Plata
33	DF	MEX	Aarón Guillén
44	DF	SCO	Alex Davey
77	FW	ZIM	Lucky Mkosana

1. USL Academy Contract

=== Technical staff ===
- (Scotland) Neill Collins – head coach /technical director
- (England) Stuart Dobson – assistant coach
- (Republic of Ireland) Kevin Foley – assistant coach
- (United States) Chad Burt – assistant coach
- (United States) Pete Calabrese – performance coach
- (United States) Eric Rudland – chief scout

=== Medical staff ===
- (United States) Andrew Keane – head athletic trainer
- (United States) Michelle Leget – assistant athletic trainer
- (United States) Dr. Mohit Bansal – team physician and orthopedic surgeon
- (United States) Dr. Vania Reyes – team physician, sports medicine

=== Front office ===
- (United States) Stuart Sternberg – owner
- (United States) Lee Cohen –president and chief operating officer
- (United States) Matthew Silverman – vice chairmen
- (United States) Brian Auld – vice chairmen

== Competitions ==
=== Exhibitions ===
The Rowdies hosted Major League Soccer teams in the Suncoast Invitational for the fifth year in a row.

February 1, 2020 Preseason	Tampa Bay Rowdies	v	Chivas Florida U23	St. Petersburg, FL
	Murphy; Mkosana			Stadium: Al Lang Stadium; Attendance: closed-door
Note: Result not made public.

February 8, 2020 Preseason	UNF Ospreys	0–2	Tampa Bay Rowdies	Jacksonville, FL
13:30 EST (UTC−5)		Report Archived September 13, 2020, at the Wayback Machine	Guillén (Hilton); Murphy (Tejada)	Stadium: Hodges Stadium

February 12, 2020 Preseason	Orlando City SC	2–1	Tampa Bay Rowdies	Orlando, FL
	Bender 70'; Urso 76'	Report	Murphy 49'	Stadium: Exploria Stadium; Attendance: closed-door

February 15, 2020 Suncoast Invitational	Tampa Bay Rowdies	2–1	Montreal Impact	St. Petersburg, FL
19:00 EST (UTC−5)	Guenzatti 14', 66' (Mkosana)	Report	Quioto 90' (pen.)	Stadium: Al Lang Stadium

February 22, 2020 Suncoast Invitational	Tampa Bay Rowdies	0–1	Inter Miami CF	St. Petersburg, FL
19:00 EST (UTC−5)		Report	Robinson 21'	Stadium: Al Lang Stadium

February 23, 2020 Preseason	Tampa Bay Rowdies	2–3	Tormenta FC	St. Petersburg, FL
	Mkosana 57' (pen.); Lachowecki 60'	Report	Mayr-Fälten 1'; Micaletto 28'; Coutinho 33'	Stadium: Al Lang Stadium; Attendance: closed-door

February 28, 2020 Preseason	USF Bulls	1–1	Tampa Bay Rowdies	Tampa, FL
19:00 EST (UTC−5)	Billhardt 27'; Claudel (yellow card) 2nd H' (yellow-red card) 66'	Report	Tejada 90+2'	Stadium: Corbett Soccer Stadium

July 1, 2020 Midseason	Tampa Bay Rowdies	v	Norwich City U23s	St. Petersburg, FL
				Stadium: Al Lang Stadium
Note: Canceled due to the COVID-19 pandemic.

=== USL Championship ===
==== Standings — Group H ====
Pos	Team	Pld	W	D	L	GF	GA	GD	Pts	PPG	Qualification
1	Tampa Bay Rowdies	16	10	3	3	25	11	+14	33	2.06	Advance to USL Championship Playoffs
2	Charleston Battery	15	9	3	3	26	15	+11	30	2.00	Advance to USL Championship Playoffs
3	Miami FC	16	4	4	8	20	34	−14	16	1.00	
4	Atlanta United 2	16	3	3	10	23	33	−10	12	0.75	

Source: USL

==== Results summary ====
Overall								Home						Away					
Pld	W	D	L	GF	GA	GD	Pts	W	D	L	GF	GA	GD	W	D	L	GF	GA	GD
16	10	3	3	25	11	+14	33	5	2	1	15	7	+8	5	1	2	10	4	+6

Last updated: 19 January 2020.
Source: Match reports

==== Results by round ====
Round	1	2	3	4	5	6	7	8	9	10	11	12	13	14	15	16
Stadium	A	H	H	A	H	A	A	H	H	A	H	H	A	A	H	H
Result	W	W	D	D	W	W	W	D	W	L	W	W	L	W	W	L
Position	1	1	1	1	1	1	1	1	1	1	1	1	1	1	1	1

Updated to match(es) played on 20 January 2020. Source: Match reports
A = Away; H = Home; W = Win; D = Draw; L = Loss

==== Results ====
March 7, 2020 1	New York Red Bulls II	0–1	Tampa Bay Rowdies	Montclair, NJ
19:00 EST (UTC−5)	Muyl (yellow card) 40'; Kilwien (yellow card) 43'	Report	Fernandes (yellow card) 30', (goal) 56' (Steinberger); Hilton (yellow card) 66'; Dumbuya (yellow card) 86'	Stadium: MSU Soccer Park at Pittser Field; Attendance: 1,002; Referee: Kevin Broadley

July 11, 2020 2	Tampa Bay Rowdies	2–1	Atlanta United 2	St. Petersburg, FL
19:30 EDT (UTC−5)	Doherty (yellow card) 52'; Mkosana 61' (Tejada); Fernandes 87', (yellow card) 90'	Report	Bashti (red card) 7'; Conway 11' (Gannon); Reilly (yellow card) 90+7'	Stadium: Al Lang Stadium; Attendance: 140; Referee: Elvis Osmanovic

July 17, 2020 3	Tampa Bay Rowdies	2–2	North Carolina FC	St. Petersburg, FL
18:45 EDT (UTC−5)	Guenzatti 7' (Fernandes); Fernandes 22'; Mkosana (yellow card) 40'	Report	Fortune 56'; Kristo 83' (Taylor)	Stadium: Al Lang Stadium; Attendance: 141; Referee: Gabriele Giusti

July 25, 2020 4	Birmingham Legion	1–1	Tampa Bay Rowdies	Birmingham, AL
19:30 CDT (UTC−5)	Crognale 16' (Lapa); Akinyode (yellow card) 45+1'; Asiedu (yellow card) 66'	Report	Lasso (yellow card) 13'; Guenzatti 51' (Tejada)	Stadium: BBVA Compass Field; Referee: Chris Ruska

July 31, 2020 5	Tampa Bay Rowdies	2–0	Charleston Battery	St. Petersburg, FL
19:30 EDT (UTC−4)	Lasso (yellow card) 31'; Guenzatti 40' (Doherty); Fernandes (yellow card) 68'; Johnson 88' (Guenzatti)	Report	Gdula (yellow card) 3'; Zarokostas (yellow card) 43' van Schaik (yellow card) 63' (yellow-red card) 81'	Stadium: Al Lang Stadium; Referee: Jonathan Bilinski

August 7, 2020 6	Miami FC	0–3	Tampa Bay Rowdies	Miami, FL
19:00 EDT (UTC−5)	Rozeboom (yellow card) 36'; Williams (yellow card) 64'; Thiaw (yellow card) 76'	Report	Guenzatti 38'; Johnson 85' (Doherty); Tejada 90+4' (Hilton)	Stadium: Riccardo Silva Stadium; Referee: Elvis Osmanovic

August 12, 2020 7	Atlanta United 2	0–2	Tampa Bay Rowdies	Kennesaw, GA
19:30 EDT (UTC−5)	Goodrum (yellow card) 22'; Diop (yellow card) 90+6'	Report	Lasso 34' (Hilton); Tejada 81' (Ekra)	Stadium: Fifth Third Bank Stadium; Referee: Kyle Johnston

August 16, 2020 8	Tampa Bay Rowdies	1–1	Miami FC	St. Petersburg, FL
19:30 EDT (UTC−5)	Guillén (yellow card) 31'; Mkosana 59' (Johnson)	Report	Velásquez 7' (Saydee); Griffiths (yellow card) 11'; Othello (yellow card) 45+4'; Heath (yellow card) 76'; Thiaw (yellow card) 82'	Stadium: Al Lang Stadium; Attendance: 244; Referee: Tori Penso

August 22, 2020 9	Tampa Bay Rowdies	2–1	Atlanta United 2	St. Petersburg, FL
19:30 EDT (UTC−5)	Doherty 21' (Ekra); Murphy 39' (Ekra); Ekra (yellow card) 45+2'	Report	Macky Diop (yellow card) 37'; Njie (yellow card) 45+1'; Goodrum 90' (pen.)	Stadium: Al Lang Stadium; Attendance: 281; Referee: Gabriele Giusti

August 29, 2020 10	Charleston Battery	1–0	Tampa Bay Rowdies	Charleston, SC
19:30 EDT (UTC−5)	Zarokostas 22' (Kelly-Rosales); Kelly-Rosales (yellow card) 41'; Archer (yellow card) 47'	Report	Johnson (yellow card) 34'; Scarlett (yellow card) 45+3'	Stadium: MUSC Health Stadium; Attendance: 203; Referee: Matthew Thompson

September 2, 2020 11	Tampa Bay Rowdies	3–0	Miami FC	St. Petersburg, FL
19:30 EDT (UTC−5)	Steinberger (yellow card) 11'; Scarlett 39' (Hilton); Guenzatti 64' (Lasso); Fernandes 83' (pen.)	Report	Sam (yellow card) 37'; Thiaw (yellow card) 42'; Rozeboom (yellow card) 82'	Stadium: Al Lang Stadium; Attendance: 180; Referee: Alyssa Nichols

September 6, 2020 12	Tampa Bay Rowdies	2–0	Philadelphia Union II	St. Petersburg, FL
21:56 EDT (UTC−5)	Lasso (yellow card) 4'; Guenzatti 6' (Johnson); Ekra 39' (Steinberger); Louro (yellow card) 60'	Report	Aaronson (yellow card) 50'; Ofeimu (yellow card) 56'	Stadium: Al Lang Stadium; Attendance: 140; Referee: Tori Penso

September 11, 2020 13	Charleston Battery	1–0	Tampa Bay Rowdies	Charleston, SC
19:30 EDT (UTC−5)	Lewis 54' (Cichero); Archer (yellow card) 58'; Zarokostas (yellow card) 81'; Paterson (yellow card) 89'	Report	Oduro (yellow card) 14'	Stadium: MUSC Health Stadium; Attendance: 250; Referee: Kevin Broadley

September 16, 2020 14	Atlanta United 2	1–2	Tampa Bay Rowdies	Kennesaw, GA
19:30 EDT (UTC−5)	Scarlett 55' (o.g.); Goodrum (yellow card) 61'; Fortune (yellow card) 67'	Report	Lasso 29' (Fernandes); Fernandes (yellow card) 81'; Murphy (yellow card) 82'; Guenzatti 90+5' (Dalgaard)	Stadium: Fifth Third Bank Stadium; Referee: Sergii Demianchuk

September 26, 2020 15	Miami FC	0–1	Tampa Bay Rowdies	Miami, FL
22:01 EDT (UTC−5)	Williams (yellow card) 75'; Granitto (yellow card) 88'; Ndam (yellow card) 90+1'	Report	Scarlett (yellow card) 16'; Ekra (yellow card) 25'; Guenzatti 37' (Scarlett)	Stadium: Riccardo Silva Stadium; Referee: Natalie Simon

October 3, 2020 16	Tampa Bay Rowdies	1–2	Charleston Battery	St. Petersburg, FL
19:30 EDT (UTC−5)	Guenzatti (yellow card) 39'; Doherty (yellow card) 43'; Lasso 62'; Najem (yellow card) 68'; Oduro (yellow card) 90'	Report	Bosua (yellow card) 14'; Nelson (yellow card) 34'; Zarokostas 57', 84' (Adesodun), (yellow card) 87'; Marini (yellow card) 80'; Crawford (yellow card) 85'	Stadium: Al Lang Stadium; Attendance: 403; Referee: Jonathan Bilinski

=== USL Championship playoffs ===
==== Bracket ====
Conference quarter-finals October 10	Conference semi-finals October 17
A1	Reno 1868 FC	4
B2	LA Galaxy II	1
A1	Reno 1868 FC	2 (4)
B1	Phoenix Rising FC (p)	2 (5)
B1	Phoenix Rising FC (a.e.t.)	1
A2	Sacramento Republic FC	0
Western Conference
C1	El Paso Locomotive FC (p)	2 (4)
D2	FC Tulsa	2 (2)
C1	El Paso Locomotive FC (p)	1 (5)
C2	New Mexico United	1 (3)
D1	San Antonio FC	0
C2	New Mexico United (a.e.t.)	1
E1	Louisville City FC	2
F2	Pittsburgh Rivehounds	0
E1	Louisville City FC	2
E2	Saint Louis FC	0
F1	Hartford Athletic	0
E2	Saint Louis FC	1
Eastern Conference
G1	Charlotte Independence	1
H2	Charleston Battery (a.e.t.)	2
H2	Charleston Battery	0
H1	Tampa Bay Rowdies	1
H1	Tampa Bay Rowdies	4
G2	Birmingham Legion FC	2

Conference finals October 24
B1	Phoenix Rising FC (p)	1 (4)
C1	El Paso Locomotive FC	1 (2)
E1	Louisville City FC	1
H1	Tampa Bay Rowdies	2

USL Championship cancelled
B1	Phoenix Rising FC	Ø
H1	Tampa Bay Rowdies	Ø

==== Results ====
October 10, 2020 EC Quarterfinal	Tampa Bay Rowdies	4–2	Birmingham Legion FC	St. Petersburg, Florida
19:30 EDT (UTC−5)	Doherty 8' (Steinberger); Guenzatti 38' (Dalgaard); Mkosana 78' (Johnson); Fernandes 80' (Guenzatti)	Report	Crognale (yellow card) 10'; Lopez (yellow card) 20'; Williams (yellow card) 42'; Kasim 57'; Lapa 63' (Brett); Cromwell (yellow card) 85'	Stadium: Al Lang Stadium; Attendance: 1,098; Referee: Eric Tattersall

October 17, 2020 EC Semifinal	Tampa Bay Rowdies	1–0	Charleston Battery	St. Petersburg, Florida
19:30 EDT (UTC−5)	Scarlett (yellow card) 38'; Mkosana 79' (Steinberger)	Report	Archer (yellow card) 57'	Stadium: Al Lang Stadium; Attendance: 1,301; Referee: Ismir Pekmic

October 24, 2020 EC Final	Louisville City FC	1–2	Tampa Bay Rowdies	Louisville, Kentucky
19:30 EDT (UTC−5)	McMahon (yellow card) 27'; Lachowecki 47' (o.g.)	Report	Steinberger 3' (Fernandes); Lasso (yellow card) 29'; Dalgaard (yellow card) 38'; Guenzatti 45+3'; Guillén (yellow card) 83'; Ekra (yellow card) 90+1'	Stadium: Lynn Family Stadium; Attendance: 4,900; Referee: Jon Freemon

November 1, 2020 USL Final	Tampa Bay Rowdies	cancelled	Phoenix Rising FC	St. Petersburg, Florida
8:30 PM EST				Stadium: Al Lang Stadium
Note: The Final was cancelled the day before because several Tampa Bay players and staff tested positive for COVID-19. No league champion will be chosen. Phoenix relinquished the right to host the final as a gesture of respect to the LGBTQ community for the incident between Phoenix Rising and San Diego Loyal on September 30.

=== U.S. Open Cup ===
April 7, 2020 2nd Round	Tampa Bay Rowdies (Florida)	Canceled	(Florida) The Villages SC or (Georgia (U.S. state)) Tormenta FC 2	St. Petersburg, FL
				Stadium: Al Lang Stadium
Note: Tournament canceled due to the COVID-19 pandemic

== Honors ==
- USL Championship finalist
- USL Group H Champion
- USL Eastern Conference Champion

=== Individual honors ===
- USL All-League

Forrest Lasso

- USL Defender of the year

Forrest Lasso (2020)
