= 2020 USL Championship season =

10th season of the USL Championship

USL Championship
- Season: 2020
- Champions: Tampa Bay Rowdies (Eastern Conference); Phoenix Rising FC (Western Conference)
- Regular season title: Reno 1868 FC (1st Title)
- Matches: 276
- Goals: 851 (3.08 per match)
- Best Player: (Ghana) Solomon Asante Phoenix Rising FC
- Top goalscorer: (Jamaica) Junior Flemmings Phoenix Rising FC (14 Goals)
- Best goalkeeper: (United States) Danny Vitiello Pittsburgh Riverhounds SC
- Biggest home win: RNO 7–1 POR (September 5); NYR 6–0 PHI (September 9)
- Biggest away win: PHI 0–6 PIT (July 18)
- Highest scoring: NYR 5–4 PHI (September 26)
- Longest winning run: 6 matches Sacramento Republic FC (August 8 – September 9)
- Longest unbeaten run: 11 matches San Antonio FC (March 7 – September 5)
- Longest winless run: 12 matches RGV FC Toros (March 8 – September 5)
- Longest losing run: 10 matches Portland Timbers 2 (March 7 – September 5)
- Highest attendance: 11,569; SAC 1–1 TUL (March 7)
- Lowest attendance: 467; PHI 0–0 LDN (March 7)
- Total attendance: 64,619
- Average attendance: 4,039

The 2020 USL Championship season was the tenth season of the USL Championship and fourth under Division II sanctioning. This was the second season under the name "USL Championship", having used the name "United Soccer League" through 2018. Real Monarchs were the defending USL Cup champions. The 2020 season saw 35 teams participate in two conferences during the regular season.

On November 8, 2019, Ottawa Fury FC announced that it had suspended operations. The team had received sanctioning from its nation's governing body, Canada Soccer, but was denied by U.S. Soccer and the continental governing body of CONCACAF. Additionally, the 2020 season was the first season without Nashville SC. The club's identity transferred to a Major League Soccer team that started play in 2020.

The season was suspended on March 12 due to the COVID-19 pandemic in North America. On June 4, the league announced a return to play on July 11, 2020.

The playoffs began on October 10, and originally scheduled to conclude with the USL Championship Final on November 1. The Final was then cancelled the day before because several Tampa Bay Rowdies players and staff tested positive for COVID-19. The championship would not be awarded.

Real Monarchs were the defending USL Championship champions, but failed to qualify for the playoffs.

== Changes from 2019 ==
Expansion clubs

- San Diego Loyal SC

Rebranded clubs

- Bethlehem Steel FC rebranded as Philadelphia Union II
- Swope Park Rangers rebranded as Sporting Kansas City II
- Tulsa Roughnecks FC rebranded as FC Tulsa

Moves

- Ottawa Fury FC franchise rights sold to Miami FC

Departing clubs

- Fresno FC (ceased operations)
- Nashville SC (moved to MLS)

== Teams ==
Locations of teams for the 2020 USL Championship season
Western Conference Eastern Conference

The following teams are playing in the 2020 USL Championship season:

Team	Location	Stadium	Capacity	Head coach	MLS affiliate / ownership
Atlanta United 2	Kennesaw, Georgia	Fifth Third Bank Stadium	8,318	(England) Tony Annan (interim)	Atlanta United FC
Austin Bold FC	Austin, Texas	Bold Stadium	5,000	(Brazil) Marcelo Serrano	
Birmingham Legion FC	Birmingham, Alabama	BBVA Field	5,000	(United States) Tom Soehn	
Charleston Battery	Charleston, South Carolina	Patriots Point Soccer Complex	5,000	(United States) Mike Anhaeuser	
Charlotte Independence	Matthews, North Carolina	Sportsplex at Matthews	5,000	(United States) Mike Jeffries	
Colorado Springs Switchbacks FC	Colorado Springs, Colorado	Weidner Field	5,000	(South Africa) Alan Koch	Colorado Rapids
El Paso Locomotive FC	El Paso, Texas	Southwest University Park	9,500	(England) Mark Lowry	
Hartford Athletic	Hartford, Connecticut	Dillon Stadium	5,500	(Tunisia) Radhi Jaïdi	
Indy Eleven	Indianapolis, Indiana	Lucas Oil Stadium	62,421	(Scotland) Martin Rennie	
LA Galaxy II	Carson, California	Dignity Health Track Stadium	5,000	(United States) Junior Gonzalez	LA Galaxy
Las Vegas Lights FC	Las Vegas, Nevada	Cashman Field	9,334	(Canada) Frank Yallop	
Loudoun United FC	Leesburg, Virginia	Segra Field	5,000	(United States) Ryan Martin	D.C. United
Louisville City FC	Louisville, Kentucky	Lynn Family Stadium	11,700	(United States) John Hackworth	
Memphis 901 FC	Memphis, Tennessee	AutoZone Park	10,000	(United States) Ben Pirmann (interim)	
Miami FC	Miami, Florida	Riccardo Silva Stadium	20,000	(Scotland) Paul Dalglish	
New Mexico United	Albuquerque, New Mexico	Isotopes Park	13,500	(United States) Troy Lesesne	
New York Red Bulls II	Montclair, New Jersey	MSU Soccer Park at Pittser Field	5,000	(United States) John Wolyniec	New York Red Bulls
North Carolina FC	Cary, North Carolina	WakeMed Soccer Park	10,000	(United States) Dave Sarachan	
OKC Energy FC	Oklahoma City, Oklahoma	Taft Stadium	7,500	(United States) John Pascarella	
Orange County SC	Irvine, California	Champion Stadium	5,000	(United States) Braeden Cloutier	
Philadelphia Union II	Chester, Pennsylvania	Subaru Park	18,500	(United States) Marlon LeBlanc (interim)	Philadelphia Union
Phoenix Rising FC	Tempe, Arizona	Casino Arizona Field	6,200	(United States) Rick Schantz	
Pittsburgh Riverhounds SC	Pittsburgh, Pennsylvania	Highmark Stadium	5,000	(United States) Bob Lilley	
Portland Timbers 2	Hillsboro, Oregon	Hillsboro Stadium	7,600	(New Zealand) Cameron Knowles	Portland Timbers
Real Monarchs	Herriman, Utah	Zions Bank Stadium	5,000	(Colombia) Jámison Olave	Real Salt Lake
Reno 1868 FC	Reno, Nevada	Greater Nevada Field	9,013	(United States) Ian Russell	San Jose Earthquakes
Rio Grande Valley FC Toros	Edinburg, Texas	H-E-B Park	9,400	(United States) Gerson Echeverry	Houston Dynamo
Sacramento Republic FC	Sacramento, California	Papa Murphy's Park	11,569	(England) Mark Briggs	
Saint Louis FC	Fenton, Missouri	West Community Stadium	5,500	(United States) Steve Trittschuh	
San Antonio FC	San Antonio, Texas	Toyota Field	8,296	(Canada) Alen Marcina	New York City FC
San Diego Loyal SC	San Diego, California	Torero Stadium	6,000	(United States) Landon Donovan	
Sporting Kansas City II	Kansas City, Kansas	Children's Mercy Park	18,467	(Brazil) Paulo Nagamura	Sporting Kansas City
Tacoma Defiance	Tacoma, Washington	Cheney Stadium	6,500	(Scotland) Chris Little	Seattle Sounders FC
Tampa Bay Rowdies	St. Petersburg, Florida	Al Lang Stadium	7,227	(Scotland) Neill Collins	
FC Tulsa	Tulsa, Oklahoma	ONEOK Field	7,833	(Nigeria) Michael Nsien	

MLS-affiliated
MLS-owned
1. Non-soccer specific stadium.
2. Not to be confused with the Switchbacks' future home of Weidner Field in downtown Colorado Springs, set to open for the 2021 season. The "Weidner Field" name was officially transferred to the downtown venue on October 15, 2020.

== Competition format ==
The original divisional alignment was announced on December 19, 2019. The regular season and playoff format was announced on January 9, 2020. The season began on March 6 and was scheduled to conclude on October 17. The 2020 USL Cup Playoffs were expected to begin October 21, and conclude with the final match between November 12–16. The top 10 teams were to make the playoffs in each conference with the same format as in 2019.

=== Group alignment for resumption of play ===
The COVID-19 pandemic caused a radical remaking of the competition for 2020. When the season resumed on July 11, the teams were competing in small groups of four or five teams with a geographic component, with the top two teams in each group qualifying for the postseason.

Group	Teams
A	Portland Timbers 2, Reno 1868 FC, Sacramento Republic FC, Tacoma Defiance
B	LA Galaxy II, Las Vegas Lights FC, Orange County SC, Phoenix Rising FC, San Diego Loyal SC
C	Colorado Springs Switchbacks FC, El Paso Locomotive FC, New Mexico United, Real Monarchs SLC
D	Austin Bold FC, OKC Energy FC, Rio Grande Valley FC, San Antonio FC, FC Tulsa
E	Indy Eleven, Louisville City FC, Sporting Kansas City II, Saint Louis FC
F	Hartford Athletic, Loudoun United FC, New York Red Bulls II, Philadelphia Union II, Pittsburgh Riverhounds SC
G	Birmingham Legion FC, Charlotte Independence, Memphis 901 FC, North Carolina FC
H	Atlanta United 2, Charleston Battery, Miami FC, Tampa Bay Rowdies

=== Managerial changes ===
Team	Outgoing manager	Manner of departure	Date of vacancy	Incoming manager	Date of appointment
OKC Energy FC	(England) Steve Cooke	Contract not renewed	October 22, 2019	(United States) John Pascarella	November 22, 2019
Hartford Athletic	(Denmark) Jimmy Nielsen	Mutual separation	October 27, 2019	(Tunisia) Radhi Jaïdi	November 8, 2019
San Antonio FC	(England) Darren Powell	Mutual separation	October 30, 2019	(Canada) Alen Marcina	December 9, 2019
Sacramento Republic FC	(New Zealand) Simon Elliott	Contract not renewed	November 5, 2019	(England) Mark Briggs	December 16, 2019
Real Monarchs SLC	(Colombia) Jamison Olave (interim)	End of interim period	November 20, 2019	(Colombia) Jamison Olave	November 20, 2019
Saint Louis FC	(Wales) Anthony Pulis	Mutual separation	January 4, 2020	(United States) Steve Trittschuh	January 4, 2020
LA Galaxy II	(United States) Junior Gonzalez (interim)	End of interim period	January 8, 2020	(United States) Junior Gonzalez	January 8, 2020
Philadelphia Union II	(United States) Brendan Burke	Joined Front Office	February 12, 2020	(Germany) Sven Gartung	February 12, 2020
Las Vegas Lights FC	(United States) Eric Wynalda	Mutual separation	June 17, 2020	(Canada) Frank Yallop	June 29, 2020
Atlanta United 2	(Scotland) Stephen Glass	Promoted to Parent Club	July 27, 2020	(England) Tony Annan (interim)	July 27, 2020
Philadelphia Union II	(Germany) Sven Gartung	Mutual separation	August 5, 2020	(United States) Marlon LeBlanc (interim)	August 5, 2020
Miami FC	(United States) Nelson Vargas	Mutual separation	August 10, 2020	(Scotland) Paul Dalglish	August 10, 2020
Memphis 901 FC	(United States) Tim Mulqueen	Fired	September 15, 2020	(United States) Ben Pirmann (interim)	September 15, 2020
Phoenix Rising FC	(United States) Rick Schantz	Placed on administrative leave	October 3, 2020	(United States) Blair Gavin (interim)	October 3, 2020
Phoenix Rising FC	(United States) Blair Gavin (interim)	End of interim period	October 21, 2020	(United States) Rick Schantz	October 21, 2020

== Group tables ==
=== Group A ===
Group A covers Northwestern states including Northern California.

Pos	Team	Pld	W	D	L	GF	GA	GD	Pts	PPG	Qualification
1	Reno 1868 FC	16	11	3	2	43	21	+22	36	2.25	Advance to USL Championship Playoffs
2	Sacramento Republic FC	16	8	6	2	27	17	+10	30	1.88	Advance to USL Championship Playoffs
3	Tacoma Defiance	16	4	2	10	25	32	−7	14	0.88	
4	Portland Timbers 2	16	3	0	13	20	50	−30	9	0.56	

Source: USL

=== Group B ===
Group B covers Southern California, Arizona, and Nevada.

Pos	Team	Pld	W	D	L	GF	GA	GD	Pts	PPG	Qualification
1	Phoenix Rising FC	16	11	2	3	46	17	+29	35	2.19	Advance to USL Championship Playoffs
2	LA Galaxy II	16	8	2	6	29	32	−3	26	1.63	Advance to USL Championship Playoffs
3	Orange County SC	16	7	3	6	18	18	0	24	1.50	
4	San Diego Loyal SC	16	6	5	5	17	18	−1	23	1.44	
5	Las Vegas Lights FC	16	2	5	9	24	34	−10	11	0.69	

Source: USL

=== Group C ===
Group C includes the Rocky Mountain states, New Mexico and El Paso, Texas.

Pos	Team	Pld	W	D	L	GF	GA	GD	Pts	PPG	Qualification
1	El Paso Locomotive FC	16	9	5	2	24	14	+10	32	2.00	Advance to USL Championship Playoffs
2	New Mexico United	15	8	3	4	23	17	+6	27	1.80	Advance to USL Championship Playoffs
3	Colorado Springs Switchbacks FC	16	2	7	7	19	28	−9	13	0.81	
4	Real Monarchs	16	3	2	11	14	25	−11	11	0.69	

Source: USL

=== Group D ===
Group D represents Texas (except El Paso) and Oklahoma.

Pos	Team	Pld	W	D	L	GF	GA	GD	Pts	PPG	Qualification
1	San Antonio FC	16	10	3	3	30	14	+16	33	2.06	Advance to USL Championship Playoffs
2	FC Tulsa	15	6	7	2	21	16	+5	25	1.67	Advance to USL Championship Playoffs
3	Austin Bold FC	16	5	7	4	30	27	+3	22	1.38	
4	Rio Grande Valley FC Toros	14	2	3	9	17	28	−11	9	0.64	
5	OKC Energy FC	16	1	7	8	12	29	−17	10	0.63	

Source: USL

=== Group E ===
Group E covers the Midwestern states.

Pos	Team	Pld	W	D	L	GF	GA	GD	Pts	PPG	Qualification
1	Louisville City FC	16	11	2	3	28	12	+16	35	2.19	Advance to USL Championship Playoffs
2	Saint Louis FC	16	7	4	5	22	21	+1	25	1.56	Advance to USL Championship Playoffs
3	Indy Eleven	16	7	2	7	21	19	+2	23	1.44	
4	Sporting Kansas City II	16	5	1	10	21	30	−9	16	1.00	

Source: USL

=== Group F ===
Group F includes the Northeastern states.

Pos	Team	Pld	W	D	L	GF	GA	GD	Pts	PPG	Qualification
1	Hartford Athletic	16	11	2	3	31	24	+7	35	2.19	Advance to USL Championship Playoffs
2	Pittsburgh Riverhounds SC	16	11	1	4	39	10	+29	34	2.13	Advance to USL Championship Playoffs
3	New York Red Bulls II	16	5	0	11	30	37	−7	15	0.94	
4	Philadelphia Union II	16	2	3	11	20	45	−25	9	0.56	
5	Loudoun United FC	13	1	3	9	10	28	−18	6	0.46	

Source: USL

=== Group G ===
Group G includes the northern part of the Southern United States.

Pos	Team	Pld	W	D	L	GF	GA	GD	Pts	PPG	Qualification
1	Charlotte Independence	16	8	4	4	24	22	+2	28	1.75	Advance to USL Championship Playoffs
2	Birmingham Legion FC	16	7	4	5	29	19	+10	25	1.56	Advance to USL Championship Playoffs
3	North Carolina FC	15	6	1	8	17	21	−4	19	1.27	
4	Memphis 901 FC	15	4	4	7	24	31	−7	16	1.07	

Source: USL

=== Group H ===
Group H includes the southern and southeasternmost states.

Pos	Team	Pld	W	D	L	GF	GA	GD	Pts	PPG	Qualification
1	Tampa Bay Rowdies	16	10	3	3	25	11	+14	33	2.06	Advance to USL Championship Playoffs
2	Charleston Battery	15	9	3	3	26	15	+11	30	2.00	Advance to USL Championship Playoffs
3	Miami FC	16	4	4	8	20	34	−14	16	1.00	
4	Atlanta United 2	16	3	3	10	23	33	−10	12	0.75	

Source: USL

== Conference tables ==
=== Western Conference ===
Pos	Team	Pld	W	L	T	GF	GA	GD	Pts	PPG	Qualification
1	Reno 1868 FC	16	11	2	3	43	21	+22	36	2.25	Conference Quarterfinals
2	Phoenix Rising FC	16	11	3	2	46	17	+29	35	2.19	Conference Quarterfinals
3	San Antonio FC	16	10	3	3	30	14	+16	33	2.06	Conference Quarterfinals
4	El Paso Locomotive FC	16	9	2	5	24	14	+10	32	2.00	Conference Quarterfinals
5	Sacramento Republic	16	8	2	6	27	17	+10	30	1.88	Conference Quarterfinals
6	New Mexico United	15	8	4	3	23	17	+6	27	1.80	Conference Quarterfinals
7	FC Tulsa	15	6	2	7	21	16	+5	25	1.67	Conference Quarterfinals
8	LA Galaxy II	16	8	6	2	29	32	−3	26	1.63	Conference Quarterfinals
9	Orange County SC	16	7	6	3	18	18	0	24	1.50	
10	San Diego Loyal SC	16	6	5	5	17	18	−1	23	1.44	
11	Austin Bold FC	16	5	4	7	30	26	+4	22	1.38	
12	Tacoma Defiance	16	4	10	2	25	32	−7	14	0.88	
13	Colorado Springs Switchbacks	16	2	7	7	19	28	−9	13	0.81	
14	Real Monarchs	16	3	11	2	14	25	−11	11	0.69	
15	Las Vegas Lights FC	16	2	9	5	24	34	−10	11	0.69	
16	Rio Grande Valley Toros	14	2	9	3	17	28	−11	9	0.64	
17	OKC Energy FC	16	1	8	7	12	29	−17	10	0.63	
18	Portland Timbers 2	16	3	13	0	20	50	−30	9	0.56	

Source: USL Championship
Rules for classification: 1) points per game; 2) points; 3) total wins; 4) total goal differential; 5) total goals scored; 6) disciplinary points; 7) coin toss or drawing of lots.

=== Eastern Conference ===
Pos	Team	Pld	W	L	T	GF	GA	GD	Pts	PPG	Qualification
1	Louisville City FC	16	11	3	2	28	12	+16	35	2.19	Conference Quarterfinals
2	Hartford Athletic	16	11	3	2	31	24	+7	35	2.19	Conference Quarterfinals
3	Pittsburgh Riverhounds SC	16	11	4	1	39	10	+29	34	2.13	Conference Quarterfinals
4	Tampa Bay Rowdies	16	10	3	3	25	11	+14	33	2.06	Conference Quarterfinals
5	Charleston Battery	15	9	3	3	26	15	+11	30	2.00	Conference Quarterfinals
6	Charlotte Independence	16	8	4	4	24	22	+2	28	1.75	Conference Quarterfinals
7	Birmingham Legion FC	16	7	5	4	29	19	+10	25	1.56	Conference Quarterfinals
8	Saint Louis FC	16	7	5	4	22	21	+1	25	1.56	Conference Quarterfinals
9	Indy Eleven	16	7	7	2	21	19	+2	23	1.44	
10	North Carolina FC	15	6	8	1	17	21	−4	19	1.27	
11	Memphis 901 FC	15	4	7	4	24	31	−7	16	1.07	
12	Sporting Kansas City II	16	5	10	1	21	30	−9	16	1.00	
13	Miami FC	16	4	8	4	20	34	−14	16	1.00	
14	New York Red Bulls II	16	5	11	0	30	37	−7	15	0.94	
15	Atlanta United 2	16	3	10	3	23	33	−10	12	0.75	
16	Philadelphia Union II	16	2	11	3	20	45	−25	9	0.56	
17	Loudoun United FC	13	1	9	3	10	28	−18	6	0.46	

Source: USL Championship
Rules for classification: 1) points per game; 2) points; 3) total wins; 4) total goal differential; 5) total goals scored; 6) disciplinary points; 7) coin toss or drawing of lots.

== Results table ==
Color Key: Home • Away • Neutral • Win • Loss • Draw • Cancelled
Club	Matches															
Club	1	2	3	4	5	6	7	8	9	10	11	12	13	14	15	16
Atlanta United 2 (ATL)	CHS	TBR	MEM	CHS	MIA	CHS	BHM	TBR	CHS	MIA	TBR	PHI	MIA	TBR	NYR	MIA
Atlanta United 2 (ATL)	0–1	1–2	2–2	0–3	4–3	1–1	0–1	0–2	2–3	2–2	1–2	2–1	1–2	1–2	5–3	1–3
Austin Bold FC (AUS)	NMU	OKC	SAN	RGV	SAN	TUL	RGV	COS	OKC	TUL	TUL	SAN	SKC	OKC	RGV	SAN
Austin Bold FC (AUS)	1–0	1–3	2–4	4–1	1–1	2–2	3–2	4–4	1–1	1–1	2–2	2–3	4–0	0–0	0–2	2–1
Birmingham Legion FC (BHM)	MEM	CHS	TBR	NCA	CLT	ATL	CLT	NCA	MEM	CLT	NCA	MEM	CLT	MIA	NCA	MEM
Birmingham Legion FC (BHM)	3–0	2–1	1–1	0–1	4–1	1–0	1–1	2–0	2–2	4–1	1–2	1–1	0–3	4–0	1–2	1–3
Charleston Battery (CHS)	ATL	BHM	ATL	TBR	ATL	CLT	ATL	NCA	MIA	TBR	MIA	TBR	MIA	LDN	MIA	TBR
Charleston Battery (CHS)	1–0	1–2	3–0	0–2	1–1	1–1	3–2	3–0	3–1	1–0	1–1	1–0	2–0	CAN	3–4	2–1
Charlotte Independence (CLT)	SKC	MEM	BHM	CHS	BHM	MEM	MIA	NCA	BHM	MEM	NCA	BHM	NCA	MIA	MEM	NCA
Charlotte Independence (CLT)	2–1	2–2	1–4	1–1	1–1	3–2	1–2	1–0	1–4	2–0	3–1	3–1	1–0	0–0	1–2	1–0
Colorado Springs Switchbacks (COS)	OKC	NMU	SLC	SLC	ELP	NMU	AUS	NMU	ELP	OKC	SLC	ELP	NMU	SLC	ELP	TUL
Colorado Springs Switchbacks (COS)	2–1	1–2	3–3	1–2	2–4	0–1	0–0	4–4	1–1	0–0	1–4	0–2	2–1	1–1	0–0	0–2
El Paso Locomotive (ELP)	OCO	RGV	NMU	NMU	PHX	COS	SLC	SLC	COS	NMU	SAN	COS	SLC	NMU	COS	SLC
El Paso Locomotive (ELP)	0–0	1–0	2–2	1–2	1–3	4–2	1–0	0–0	2–1	3–2	2–1	2–0	1–0	0–0	0–0	4–0
Hartford Athletic (HFD)	NYR	LDN	PHI	IND	LDN	NYR	LDN	PGH	LDN	PGH	NYR	PHI	PHI	PGH	PHI	NYR
Hartford Athletic (HFD)	1–0	3–1	3–2	1–4	4–1	2–1	2–2	0–3	2–1	0–5	3–1	3–0	1–1	1–0	3–2	2–0
Indy Eleven (IND)	MEM	STL	SKC	PGH	STL	HAR	SKC	LOU	PGH	LOU	LOU	SKC	LOU	STL	SKC	STL
Indy Eleven (IND)	4–2	2–0	2–1	1–0	0–1	4–1	0–1	1–1	1–0	0–1	1–3	2–1	0–2	1–1	1–2	1–2
LA Galaxy II (LAG)	RGV	PHX	SDG	SAC	PHX	OCO	POR	LVL	OCO	OCO	SDG	LVL	SDG	LVL	OCO	PHX
LA Galaxy II (LAG)	5–1	0–4	1–0	1–0	1–4	1–2	3–2	4–3	1–2	2–1	0–3	3–2	1–1	2–2	3–1	1–4
Las Vegas Lights (LVL)	SDG	SDG	RNO	OCO	TAC	PHX	OCO	LAG	SDG	PHX	PHX	LAG	OCO	LAG	RNO	OCO
Las Vegas Lights (LVL)	1–1	1–2	0–1	0–1	3–1	3–3	3–1	3–4	1–1	0–2	1–5	2–3	0–1	2–2	2–2	2–4
Loudoun United FC (LDN)	PHI	HFD	HFD	NYR	LOU	PGH	HAR	NYR	PGH	HFD	PHI	PHI	PGH	CHS	NYR	NCA
Loudoun United FC (LDN)	0–0	1–3	1–4	2–1	0–2	0–2	2–2	2–3	0–3	1–2	1–1	0–4	0–1	CAN	CAN	CAN
Louisville City FC (LOU)	NCA	PGH	STL	SKC	SKC	IND	LDN	SKC	IND	STL	IND	STL	IND	MEM	STL	SKC
Louisville City FC (LOU)	1–0	1–3	0–1	1–0	1–2	1–1	2–0	4–1	1–0	1–1	3–1	3–0	2–0	4–1	1–0	2–1
Memphis 901 FC (MEM)	IND	BHM	ATL	CLT	STL	NCA	CLT	BHM	CLT	BHM	NCA	NCA	LOU	NCA	CLT	BHM
Memphis 901 FC (MEM)	2–4	0–3	2–2	2–2	1–0	0–1	2–3	2–2	0–2	1–1	3–2	2–3	1–4	CAN	3–1	3–1
Miami FC (MIA)	STL	ATL	TBR	TBR	ATL	CLT	CHS	TBR	CHS	ATL	BHM	CHS	CLT	TBR	CHS	ATL
Miami FC (MIA)	1–4	3–4	0–3	1–1	2–2	2–1	1–3	0–3	1–1	2–1	0–4	0–2	0–0	0–1	4–3	3–1
New Mexico United (NMU)	AUS	COS	ELP	ELP	OKC	PHX	COS	SLC	SLC	COS	ELP	SLC	COS	RGV	ELP	SLC
New Mexico United (NMU)	0–1	2–1	2–2	2–1	3–0	2–5	1–0	2–0	2–1	1–1	2–3	2–0	1–2	CAN	0–0	1–0
New York Red Bulls II (NYR)	TBR	HFD	PHI	PGH	PHI	PGH	LDN	HFD	LDN	PGH	PHI	HFD	ATL	PHI	NCA	HFD
New York Red Bulls II (NYR)	0–1	0–1	5–1	2–1	2–3	1–4	1–2	1–2	3–2	0–3	6–0	1–3	3–5	5–4	0–3	0–2
North Carolina FC (NCA)	LOU	TBR	BHM	MEM	BHM	CHS	CLT	BHM	CLT	MEM	MEM	CLT	MEM	BHM	NYR	CLT
North Carolina FC (NCA)	0–1	2–2	1–0	1–0	0–2	0–3	0–1	2–1	1–3	2–3	3–2	0–1	CAN	2–1	3–0	0–1
Oklahoma City Energy (OKC)	COS	TUL	AUS	RGV	NMU	SAN	RGV	SAN	SKC	AUS	COS	TUL	SAN	AUS	TUL	RGV
Oklahoma City Energy (OKC)	1–2	1–1	3–1	1–1	0–3	0–3	0–0	0–4	0–3	1–1	0–0	1–1	0–2	0–0	2–3	2–4
Orange County SC (OCO)	ELP	PHX	PHX	SDG	LVL	LAG	LVL	SDG	LAG	LAG	SAC	SDG	LVL	PHX	LAG	LVL
Orange County SC (OCO)	0–0	1–1	1–0	2–0	1–0	2–1	1–3	0–0	2–1	1–2	1–2	0–2	1–0	0–1	1–3	4–2
Philadelphia Union II (PHI)	LDN	PGH	NYR	HFD	PGH	NYR	ATL	TBR	NYR	LDN	LDN	HFD	HFD	NYR	HFD	PGH
Philadelphia Union II (PHI)	0–0	0–6	1–5	2–3	0–4	3–2	1–2	0–2	0–6	1–1	4–0	0–3	1–1	4–5	2–3	1–2
Phoenix Rising FC (PHX)	POR	LAG	OCO	OCO	ELP	NMU	SDG	LAG	LVL	RNO	LVL	LVL	SDG	OCO	SDG	LAG
Phoenix Rising FC (PHX)	6–1	4–0	1–1	0–1	3–1	5–2	2–0	4–1	3–3	1–2	2–0	5–1	2–3	1–0	3–0	4–1
Pittsburgh Riverhounds (PGH)	LOU	PHI	IND	NYR	PHI	NYR	IND	LDN	STL	HFD	LDN	NYR	HFD	LDN	HFD	PHI
Pittsburgh Riverhounds (PGH)	3–1	6–0	0–1	1–2	4–0	4–1	0–1	2–0	2–2	3–0	3–0	3–0	5–0	1–0	0–1	2–1
Portland Timbers 2 (POR)	PHX	TAC	RNO	TAC	SAC	RNO	SAC	LAG	SAC	RNO	TAC	SLC	RNO	TAC	TAC	SAC
Portland Timbers 2 (POR)	1–6	0–3	1–4	0–4	0–1	2–5	1–2	2–3	1–2	1–7	3–0	2–1	2–5	3–1	1–2	0–4
Real Monarchs (SLC)	SAN	SDG	COS	COS	ELP	NMU	NMU	ELP	TAC	COS	NMU	POR	ELP	COS	NMU	ELP
Real Monarchs (SLC)	0–1	0–1	3–3	2–1	0–1	0–2	1–2	1–2	1–0	4–1	0–2	1–2	0–1	1–1	0–1	0–4
Reno 1868 FC (RNO)	TAC	SAC	POR	LVL	TAC	SAC	POR	SDG	PHX	POR	SAC	TAC	POR	SAC	LVL	TAC
Reno 1868 FC (RNO)	3–1	0–1	4–1	1–0	2–1	0–1	5–2	3–1	2–1	7–1	3–3	3–2	5–2	1–1	2–2	2–1
Rio Grande Valley Toros (RGV)	LAG	ELP	SAN	OKC	SAN	TUL	AUS	OKC	AUS	SAN	TUL	SAN	TUL	NMU	AUS	OKC
Rio Grande Valley Toros (RGV)	1–5	0–1	1–1	1–1	0–1	1–2	1–4	0–0	2–3	1–3	1–2	2–3	CAN	CAN	2–0	4–2
Sacramento Republic (SAC)	TUL	TAC	RNO	LAG	SDG	POR	RNO	TAC	POR	POR	OCO	RNO	TAC	RNO	TAC	POR
Sacramento Republic (SAC)	1–1	3–3	1–0	0–1	0–0	1–0	1–0	3–1	2–1	2–1	2–1	3–3	3–3	1–1	0–1	4–0
Saint Louis FC (STL)	MIA	IND	LOU	IND	MEM	SKC	TUL	SKC	PGH	LOU	SKC	LOU	SKC	IND	LOU	IND
Saint Louis FC (STL)	4–1	0–2	1–0	1–0	0–1	1–1	0–2	3–1	2–2	1–1	3–2	0–3	3–2	1–1	0–1	2–1
San Antonio FC (SAN)	SLC	RGV	RGV	AUS	OKC	TUL	AUS	OKC	TUL	RGV	RGV	ELP	AUS	OKC	TUL	AUS
San Antonio FC (SAN)	1–0	1–1	1–0	4–2	3–0	0–0	1–1	4–0	2–0	3–1	3–2	1–2	3–2	2–0	0–1	1–2
San Diego Loyal (SDG)	LVL	TAC	SLC	LAG	LVL	SAC	OCO	PHX	RNO	OCO	LVL	LAG	OCO	PHX	LAG	PHX
San Diego Loyal (SDG)	1–1	2–1	1–0	0–1	2–1	0–0	0–2	0–2	1–3	0–0	1–1	3–0	2–0	3–2	1–1	FORFEIT
Sporting Kansas City II (SKC)	CLT	IND	LOU	LOU	IND	STL	STL	LOU	OKC	TUL	STL	IND	STL	AUS	IND	LOU
Sporting Kansas City II (SKC)	1–2	1–2	0–1	2–1	1–0	1–1	1–3	1–4	3–0	2–1	2–3	1–2	2–3	0–4	2–1	1–2
Tacoma Defiance (TAC)	RNO	SDG	SAC	POR	RNO	SAC	POR	LVL	SLC	POR	RNO	SAC	POR	POR	SAC	RNO
Tacoma Defiance (TAC)	1–3	1–2	3–3	3–0	4–0	1–2	1–3	1–3	0–1	0–3	2–3	3–3	1–3	2–1	1–0	1–2
Tampa Bay Rowdies (TBR)	NYR	ATL	NCA	BHM	CHS	MIA	ATL	MIA	ATL	CHS	MIA	PHI	CHS	ATL	MIA	CHS
Tampa Bay Rowdies (TBR)	1–0	2–1	2–2	1–1	2–0	3–0	2–0	1–1	2–1	0–1	3–0	2–0	0–1	2–1	1–0	1–2
FC Tulsa (TUL)	SAC	OKC	RGV	STL	SAN	AUS	SAN	SKC	RGV	AUS	AUS	OKC	RGV	SAN	OKC	COS
FC Tulsa (TUL)	1–1	1–1	2–1	2–0	0–0	2–2	0–2	1–2	2–1	1–1	2–2	1–1	CAN	1–0	3–2	2–0

== Playoffs ==
=== Format ===
The top two teams in each group qualify for the 2020 Championship Playoffs. They began on the weekend of October 10, featuring a single-elimination, 16-team bracket. Under the revised season format, four group winners in each conference earn hosting rights for the Eastern and Western Conference Quarterfinals. Following the opening round, hosting rights will be determined by regular season record. All playoff matches will stream live on ESPN+ except the Championship final on ESPN.

=== Bracket ===
Conference Quarterfinals; October 10	Conference Semifinals; October 17
A1	Reno 1868 FC	4
B2	LA Galaxy II	1
A1	Reno 1868 FC	2 (4)
B1	Phoenix Rising FC (p)	2 (5)
B1	Phoenix Rising FC (a.e.t.)	1
A2	Sacramento Republic FC	0
Western Conference
C1	El Paso Locomotive FC (p)	2 (4)
D2	FC Tulsa	2 (2)
C1	El Paso Locomotive FC (p)	1 (5)
C2	New Mexico United	1 (3)
D1	San Antonio FC	0
C2	New Mexico United (a.e.t.)	1
E1	Louisville City FC	2
F2	Pittsburgh Riverhounds	0
E1	Louisville City FC	2
E2	Saint Louis FC	0
F1	Hartford Athletic	0
E2	Saint Louis FC	1
Eastern Conference
G1	Charlotte Independence	1
H2	Charleston Battery (a.e.t.)	2
H2	Charleston Battery	0
H1	Tampa Bay Rowdies	1
H1	Tampa Bay Rowdies	4
G2	Birmingham Legion FC	2

Conference Finals; October 24
B1	Phoenix Rising FC (p)	1 (4)
C1	El Paso Locomotive FC	1 (2)
E1	Louisville City FC	1
H1	Tampa Bay Rowdies	2

USL Championship; Cancelled
B1	Phoenix Rising FC	Ø
H1	Tampa Bay Rowdies	Ø

=== Western Conference Quarterfinals ===
October 10, 2020 QF	Reno 1868 FC	4–1	LA Galaxy II	Reno, Nevada
7:00 PM MDT	Partida 4' (yellow card) 45'; Hertzog 35', 59' (pen.) (yellow card) 77'; Langsdorf 53'; Beaury (yellow card) 85'	Report	Neal 10'; Romero (yellow card) 58'; Hernández (yellow card) 66'; Vázquez (yellow card) 74'; Saldana (red card) 76'	Stadium: Greater Nevada Field; Attendance: 250; Referee: Matthew Thompson

October 10, 2020 QF	San Antonio FC	0–1 (a.e.t.)	New Mexico United	San Antonio, Texas
7:00 PM CDT	Taintor (yellow card) 51'; Giro (yellow card) 104'; Bailone (yellow card) 105+1'; Parano (yellow card) 115'	Report	Moreno (yellow card) 48'; Mizell (yellow card) 94'; Wehan 101' (yellow card) 105+2'; Suggs (yellow card) 104'; Tinari (yellow card) 105+3'; Guzmán (yellow card) 107'	Stadium: Toyota Field; Attendance: 2,175; Referee: Elijio Arreguin

October 10, 2020 QF	El Paso Locomotive FC	2–2 (a.e.t.) (4–2 p)	FC Tulsa	El Paso, Texas
7:30 PM MDT	Carrijó 19', 82'; Borelli (yellow card) 67'; Rebellón (yellow card) 96'	Report	Bird (yellow card) 24'; Da Costa 38'; Chapman-Page (yellow card) 61' (yellow-red card) 101' (goal) 68'	Stadium: Southwest University Park; Attendance: 1,659; Referee: Brandon Stevis
	Penalties
	Ross (penalty scored); Rebellón (penalty scored); Ryan (penalty scored); Robinson (penalty scored)		(penalty scored) Altamirano; (penalty missed) Moloto; (penalty missed) Martínez; (penalty scored) Bourgeois

October 10, 2020 QF	Phoenix Rising FC	1–0 (a.e.t.)	Sacramento Republic FC	Scottsdale, Arizona
7:30 PM MST	Dadashov (yellow card) 44'; Lambert (yellow card) 109'; Asante 114'	Report	Formella (yellow card) 12'; López (yellow card) 45'; Hilliard-Arce (yellow card) 74'; McCrary (yellow card) 87'; Keinan (yellow card) 90+1'	Stadium: Casino Arizona Field; Referee: Elvis Osmanovic

=== Eastern Conference Quarterfinals ===
October 10, 2020 QF	Hartford Athletic	0–1	Saint Louis FC	Hartford, Connecticut
7:00 PM EDT	Silva (yellow card) 16'; Strong (yellow card) 45+1'; Barrera (yellow card) 61'; Politz (yellow card) 90+3'	Report	Greig (yellow card) 73'; Fall (yellow card) 89'; Rivas 90+3'	Stadium: Dillon Stadium; Attendance: 2,194; Referee: Kevin Broadley

October 10, 2020 QF	Tampa Bay Rowdies	4–2	Birmingham Legion FC	St. Petersburg, Florida
7:30 PM EDT	Doherty 8'; Guenzatti 38'; Mkosana 78'; Fernandes 80'	Report	Crognale (yellow card) 10'; Lopez (yellow card) 20'; Williams (yellow card) 42'; Kasim 57'; Lapa 63'; Cromwell (yellow card) 85'	Stadium: Al Lang Stadium; Attendance: 1,098; Referee: Eric Tattersall

October 10, 2020 QF	Louisville City FC	2–0	Pittsburgh Riverhounds SC	Louisville, Kentucky
7:30 PM EDT	Lancaster 17'; Souahy (yellow card) 26'; Hoppenot (yellow card) 29'; Jimenez (yellow card) 53'; Bone 86'	Report	Thomas (yellow card) 45'	Stadium: Lynn Family Stadium; Attendance: 4,900; Referee: Elton García

October 10, 2020 QF	Charlotte Independence	1–2 (a.e.t.)	Charleston Battery	Matthews, North Carolina
8:00 PM EDT	Roberts 64'; Martínez (yellow card) 90+4'; Dimick (yellow card) 100'; Sabella (yellow card) 118'	Report	Daley 3'; Crawford (yellow card) 63'; Paterson (yellow card) 71'; Marini (yellow card) 99'; Bosua 101' (yellow card) 109'	Stadium: Sportsplex at Matthews; Attendance: 100; Referee: Lukasz Szpala

=== Western Conference Semifinals ===
October 17, 2020 SF	Reno 1868 FC	2–2 (a.e.t.) (4–5 p)	Phoenix Rising FC	Reno, Nevada
6:00 PM PDT	Hertzog 6'; Janjigian (yellow card) 31'; Partida 40'; Bone (yellow card) 57'; Langsdorf (yellow card) 79'; Ycaza (yellow card) 90+4'; Boudadi (yellow card) 119'	Report	King (yellow card) 23'; Lambert 45+2' (yellow card) 51'; Lowe (yellow card) 65'; Asante 71'; Moar (yellow card) 94'	Stadium: Greater Nevada Field; Attendance: 700; Referee: Kevin Broadley
	Penalties
	Hertzog (penalty scored); Alfaro (penalty scored); Richards (penalty scored); Gleadle (penalty scored); Apodaca (penalty missed)		(penalty scored) Farrell; (penalty scored) Whelan; (penalty scored) Calistri; (penalty scored) King; (penalty scored) Dadashov

October 17, 2020 SF	El Paso Locomotive FC	1–1 (a.e.t.) (5–3 p)	New Mexico United	El Paso, Texas
7:30 PM MDT	Mares 30'; Borelli (yellow card) 50'; Gómez (yellow card) 52'; Moreno (yellow card) 53'; Diaz (yellow card) 112'	Report	Hamilton (yellow card) 38'; Parkes 90+5'	Stadium: Southwest University Park; Attendance: 1,659; Referee: Jon Freemon
	Penalties
	Borelli (penalty scored); Ross (penalty scored); Ryan (penalty scored); Robinson (penalty scored); Zola (penalty scored)		(penalty scored) Sandoval; (penalty scored) Wehan; (penalty scored) Ryden; (penalty missed) Parkes

=== Eastern Conference Semifinals ===
October 17, 2020 SF	Louisville City FC	2–0	Saint Louis FC	Louisville, Kentucky
7:30 PM EDT	Totsch (yellow card) 11'; Lancaster 18'; Williams (yellow card) 20'; Lundt (yellow card) 75'; Adewole 83' (o.g.)	Report	Gee (yellow card) 25'; Fink (yellow card) 82'; Samb (yellow card) 90+3'	Stadium: Lynn Family Stadium; Attendance: 4,900; Referee: Lukasz Szpala

October 17, 2020 SF	Tampa Bay Rowdies	1–0	Charleston Battery	St. Petersburg, Florida
7:30 PM EDT	Scarlett (yellow card) 38'; Mkosana 79'	Report	Archer (yellow card) 57'	Stadium: Al Lang Stadium; Attendance: 1,301; Referee: Ismir Pekmic

=== Western Conference Final ===
October 24, 2020 F	Phoenix Rising FC	1–1 (a.e.t.) (4–2 p)	El Paso Locomotive FC	Scottsdale, Arizona
7:30 PM MST	Schweitzer 18'; Farrell (yellow card) 95'; Asante (yellow card) 109'; Lowe (yellow card) 113'	Report	Monsalvez (yellow card) 4'; King (yellow card) 54'; Rebellón 59' (yellow card) 94'; Herrera (yellow card) 105+2'; Diaz (yellow card) 106'; Ryan (yellow card) 108'; Carrijó (yellow card) 111'	Stadium: Casino Arizona Field; Referee: Elton García
	Penalties
	Bakero (penalty scored); Whelan (penalty scored); Farrell (penalty scored); Moar (penalty scored)		(penalty scored) Carrijó; (penalty missed) Ross; (penalty scored) Ryan; (penalty missed) Gómez

=== Eastern Conference Final ===
October 24, 2020 F	Louisville City FC	1–2	Tampa Bay Rowdies	Louisville, Kentucky
7:30 PM EDT	McMahon (yellow card) 27'; Lachowecki 45' (o.g.)	Report	Steinberger 3'; Lasso (yellow card) 29'; Dalgaard (yellow card) 38'; Guenzatti 45+3'; Guillén (yellow card) 83'; Ekra (yellow card) 90+1'	Stadium: Lynn Family Stadium; Attendance: 4,900; Referee: Jon Freemon

=== USL Championship Final ===
The Final was cancelled the day before because several Tampa Bay players and staff tested positive for COVID-19. As a result, Phoenix Rising and Tampa Bay were recognized as conference champions, and the final was not played. League officials considered postponing the game, but this would have required quarantining both teams and giving them time for renewed training. The prospect of waiting three to four weeks to play led league officials to simply cancel the game. They also considered awarding Rising the title since it had more points than Tampa Bay, but balked at doing so because Rising earned three points by forfeit after San Diego Loyal walked off the field in protest after Rising's Junior Flemmings directed a homophobic slur at Loyal's Collin Martin.

November 1, 2020	Tampa Bay Rowdies	Cancelled	Phoenix Rising FC	St. Petersburg, Florida
8:30 PM EST				Stadium: Al Lang Stadium
Note: Phoenix relinquished the right to host the final as a gesture of respect to the LGBTQ community for the incident between Phoenix Rising and San Diego Loyal on September 30.

== Average home attendances ==
Ranked from highest to lowest average attendance.

Team	GP	Total	High	Low	Average
Sacramento Republic FC	1	11,569	11,569	11,569	11,569
Memphis 901 FC	1	8,571	8,571	8,571	8,571
San Antonio FC	1	7,020	7,020	7,020	7,020
Phoenix Rising FC	1	6,585	6,585	6,585	6,585
San Diego Loyal SC	1	6,100	6,100	6,100	6,100
OKC Energy FC	1	4,067	4,067	4,067	4,067
Saint Louis FC	1	4,019	4,019	4,019	4,019
North Carolina FC	1	3,515	3,515	3,515	3,515
Orange County SC	1	3,188	3,188	3,188	3,188
Austin Bold FC	1	2,496	2,496	2,496	2,496
Rio Grande Valley FC	1	2,300	2,300	2,300	2,300
Tacoma Defiance	2	2,178	2,178	0^{†}	1,089
New York Red Bulls II	1	1,002	1,002	1,002	1,002
Atlanta United 2	1	851	851	851	851
Sporting Kansas City II	1	691	691	691	691
Philadelphia Union II	1	467	467	467	467
Birmingham Legion FC	0	0	0	0	0
Charleston Battery	0	0	0	0	0
Charlotte Independence	0	0	0	0	0
Colorado Springs Switchbacks FC	0	0	0	0	0
El Paso Locomotive FC	0	0	0	0	0
Hartford Athletic	0	0	0	0	0
Indy Eleven	0	0	0	0	0
LA Galaxy II	0	0	0	0	0
Las Vegas Lights FC	0	0	0	0	0
Loudoun United FC	0	0	0	0	0
Louisville City FC	0	0	0	0	0
Miami FC	0	0	0	0	0
New Mexico United	0	0	0	0	0
Pittsburgh Riverhounds SC	0	0	0	0	0
Portland Timbers 2	0	0	0	0	0
Real Monarchs	0	0	0	0	0
Reno 1868 FC	0	0	0	0	0
Tampa Bay Rowdies	0	0	0	0	0
FC Tulsa	0	0	0	0	0
Total	17	64,619	11,569	0	3,801

^{†} One Tacoma Defiance home match took place closed-door due to the COVID-19 pandemic.

Sources: USL Championship Soccer Stadium Digest

== Statistical leaders ==
=== Top scorers ===
Rank	Player	Nation	Club	Goals
1	Junior Flemmings	JAM	Phoenix Rising FC	14
2	Augustine Williams	SLE	LA Galaxy II	13
3	Rufat Dadashov	AZE	Phoenix Rising FC	11
3	Dane Kelly	JAM	Charlotte Independence	11
5	Cameron Lancaster	ENG	Louisville City FC	10
5	Foster Langsdorf	USA	Reno 1868 FC	10
5	Tyler Pasher	CAN	Indy Eleven	10
8	Neco Brett	JAM	Birmingham Legion FC	9
8	Cal Jennings	USA	Memphis 901 FC	9
10	Dariusz Formella	POL	Sacramento Republic FC	8
10	Sebastián Guenzatti	URU	Tampa Bay Rowdies	8
10	Jorge Gonzalez	ESP	Portland Timbers 2	8
10	Wilson Harris	USA	Sporting Kansas City II	8
10	Luis Solignac	ARG	San Antonio FC	8
10	Darío Suárez	CUB	FC Tulsa	8
10	Romario Williams	JAM	Miami FC	8

=== Top assists ===
Rank	Player	Nation	Club	Assists
1	Solomon Asante	GHA	Phoenix Rising FC	9
2	Kenardo Forbes	JAM	Pittsburgh Riverhounds SC	8
3	Danny Barrera	USA	Hartford Athletic	7
3	Christiano François	HAI	Reno 1868 FC	7
5	Antoine Hoppenot	FRA	Louisville City FC	6
6	Xavier Báez	MEX	Austin Bold FC	5
6	Caden Clark	USA	New York Red Bulls II	5
6	Jonathan Dean	USA	Birmingham Legion FC	5
6	Bruno Lapa	BRA	Birmingham Legion FC	5
6	Santi Moar	ESP	Phoenix Rising FC	5

=== Shutouts ===
Rank	Player	Nation	Club	Shutouts
1	Logan Ketterer	USA	El Paso Locomotive FC	8
2	Evan Louro	USA	Tampa Bay Rowdies	7
2	Ben Lundt	GER	Louisville City FC	7
4	Cody Mizell	USA	New Mexico United	6
5	Jon Kempin	USA	San Diego Loyal SC	5
5	Brandon Miller	USA	Charlotte Independence	5
5	Danny Vitiello	USA	Pittsburgh Riverhounds SC	5
8	Matt Cardone	USA	San Antonio FC	4
8	Frederik Due	DEN	Orange County SC	4
8	Joe Kuzminsky	USA	Charleston Battery	4
8	Sean Lewis	USA	FC Tulsa	4
8	Zac Lubin	USA	Phoenix Rising FC	4
8	Matt Van Oekel	USA	Birmingham Legion FC	4

=== Hat-tricks ===
Player	Nation	Club	Against	Result	Date
Rufat Dadashov	AZE	Phoenix Rising FC	Portland Timbers 2	6–1	March 7
Junior Flemmings	JAM	Phoenix Rising FC	New Mexico United	5–2	August 8
Dane Kelly	JAM	Charlotte Independence	North Carolina FC	3–1	September 5
Omar Sowe	GAM	New York Red Bulls II	Philadelphia Union II	6–0	September 9
Rubio Rubin	GUA	San Diego Loyal SC	Phoenix Rising FC	3–2	September 19
Cal Jennings	USA	Memphis 901 FC	Birmingham Legion FC	3–1	October 3
Chandler Hoffman	USA	Orange County SC	Las Vegas Lights FC	4–2	October 3

Scored four goals.

== League awards ==
=== Individual awards ===
Award	Winner	Team	Reason	Ref.
Golden Boot	(Jamaica) Junior Flemmings	Phoenix Rising FC	14 Goals	
Golden Glove	(United States) Danny Vitiello	Pittsburgh Riverhounds SC	0.50 Goals against average; 5 Shutouts; 77.8% Save percentage	
Assists Champion	(Ghana) Solomon Asante	Phoenix Rising FC	9 Assists	
Goalkeeper of the Year	(Germany) Ben Lundt	Louisville City FC	7 Shutouts, 74.4 Save percentage	
Defender of the Year	(United States) Forrest Lasso	Tampa Bay Rowdies	86 clearances; 77.8 percent of tackles; 66.3 percent of aerial duels	
Coaches of the Year	(United States) Troy Lesesne	New Mexico United	2nd playoff appearance despite all road games	
Coaches of the Year	(United States) Ian Russell	Reno 1868 FC	Best record	
Young Player of the Year	(United States) Wilson Harris	Sporting Kansas City II	8 Goals	
Most Valuable Player	(Ghana) Solomon Asante	Phoenix Rising FC	6 Goals; 9 Assists; 23 Shots on goal; 42 chances created	
Goal of the Year	(Nigeria) Tobenna Uzo	FC Tulsa	Header vs OKC Energy FC	
Save of the Year	(United States) Joe Kuzminsky	Charleston Battery	vs Miami FC	

=== All-League Teams ===
First team
Goalkeeper	Defenders	Midfielders	Forwards
(Germany) Ben Lundt (LOU)	(United States) Forrest Lasso (TBR) (United States) Kalen Ryden (NMU) (United States) Sean Totsch (LOU) (French Guiana) Thomas Vancaeyezeele (PGH)	(Jamaica) Kenardo Forbes (PGH) (Brazil) Bruno Lapa (BHM) (Jamaica) Speedy Williams (LOU)	(Ghana) Solomon Asante (PHX) (England) Cameron Lancaster (LOU) (Sierra Leone) Augustine Williams (LAG)

Second team
Goalkeeper	Defenders	Midfielders	Forwards
(United States) Brandon Miller (CLT)	(Trinidad and Tobago) Leland Archer (CHS) (United States) Alex Crognale (BHM) (Trinidad and Tobago) Neveal Hackshaw (IND) (Jamaica) Jordan Scarlett (TBR)	(Haiti) Christiano François (RNO) (United States) Kevin Partida (RNO) (United States) Chris Wehan (NMU)	(Azerbaijan) Rufat Dadashov (PHX) (Jamaica) Dane Kelly (CLT) (Canada) Tyler Pasher (IND)

=== Monthly awards ===
Month	Player of the month			Goal of the month			Save of the month		Coach of the month		References
Month	Player	Club	Position	Player	Club	Position	Player	Club	Coach	Club	References
July	(Canada) Tyler Pasher	Indy Eleven	Forward	(United States) Devon Sandoval	New Mexico United	Forward	(United States) Ben Beaury	Reno 1868 FC	(Scotland) Martin Rennie	Indy Eleven	
August	(Jamaica) Junior Flemmings	Phoenix Rising FC	Forward	(United States) Rey Ortiz	Charlotte Independence	Midfielder	(United States) Colin Miller	Loudoun United FC	(Canada) Alen Marcina	San Antonio FC	
September / October	(Sierra Leone) Augustine Williams	LA Galaxy II	Forward	(Greece) Stavros Zarokostas	Charleston Battery	Forward	(Greece) Alex Tambakis	North Carolina FC	(United States) John Hackworth	Louisville City FC	

=== Weekly awards ===
Player of the Week
Week	Player	Club	Position	Reason
1	(Azerbaijan) Rufat Dadashov	Phoenix Rising FC	Forward	Hat Trick vs Portland
2	No award			
3	(Ghana) Solomon Asante	Phoenix Rising FC	Forward	2G 1A
4	(Brazil) Bruno Lapa	Birmingham Legion FC	Midfielder	3G 1A
5	(England) Deri Corfe	New York Red Bulls II	Midfielder	2G 1A
6	(Haiti) Christiano François	Reno 1868 FC	Midfielder	2G 1A
7	(Jamaica) Junior Flemmings	Phoenix Rising FC	Forward	Hat Trick vs New Mexico
8	(Bermuda) Zeiko Lewis	Charleston Battery	Midielder	2G vs Atlanta
9	(Ghana) Solomon Asante	Phoenix Rising FC	Forward	2G 3A
10	(Canada) Ryan James	Pittsburgh Riverhounds SC	Defender	2G vs Hartford
11	(Jamaica) Dane Kelly	Charlotte Independence	Forward	Hat Trick vs North Carolina
12	(France) Simon Lefebvre	Loudoun United FC	Goalkeeper	13 Saves vs Philadelphia, ties league record
13	(Guatemala) Rubio Rubin	San Diego Loyal SC	Forward	Hat Trick vs Phoenix
14	(Puerto Rico) Cody Laurendi	OKC Energy FC	Goalkeeper	5 Save Clean Sheet vs Austin
15	(United States) Cal Jennings	Memphis 901 FC	Forward	Hat Trick vs Birmingham

Goal of the Week
Week	Player	Club	Opponent
1	(El Salvador) Junior Burgos	Las Vegas Lights FC	San Diego Loyal SC
2	No award		
3	(United States) Saalih Muhammad	New Mexico United	Colorado Springs Switchbacks FC
4	(United States) Sonny Guadarrama	Austin Bold FC	OKC Energy FC
5	(United States) Devon Sandoval	New Mexico United	El Paso Locomotive FC
6	(Jamaica) Junior Flemmings	Phoenix Rising FC	El Paso Locomotive FC
7	(Cuba) Dario Suarez	FC Tulsa	Saint Louis FC
8	(Jamaica) Junior Flemmings	Phoenix Rising FC	San Diego Loyal SC
9	(United States) Kyle Murphy	Tampa Bay Rowdies	Atlanta United 2
10	(United States) Rey Ortiz	Charlotte Independence	Miami FC
11	(Greece) Stavros Zarokostas	Charleston Battery	North Carolina FC
12	(Bulgaria) Villyan Bijev	Sacramento Republic FC	Orange County SC
13	(United States) Emilio Ycaza	Reno 1868 FC	Tacoma Defiance
14	(United States) Eric Bird	FC Tulsa	San Antonio FC
15	(Nigeria) Tobenna Uzo	FC Tulsa	OKC Energy FC

Save of the Week
Week	Goalkeeper	Club	Opponent
1	(Germany) Ben Lundt	Louisville City FC	North Carolina FC
2	No award		
3	(Canada) Sean Melvin	Colorado Springs Switchbacks FC	New Mexico United
4	(United States) Ben Beaury	Reno 1868 FC	Sacramento Republic FC
5	(United States) Cody Mizell	New Mexico United	El Paso Locomotive FC
6	(United States) Eric Dick	Phoenix Rising FC	El Paso Locomotive FC
7	(United States) Phil Breno	Charleston Battery	Charlotte Independence
8	(Dominican Republic) Rafael Diaz	Sacramento Republic FC	Reno 1868 FC
9	(United States) Cody Mizell	New Mexico United	Real Monarchs
10	(United States) Ford Parker	Birmingham Legion FC	Charlotte Independence
11	(Greece) Alex Tambakis	North Carolina FC	Birmingham Legion FC
12	(Dominican Republic) Rafael Diaz	Sacramento Republic FC	Orange County SC
13	(United States) Matt Freese	Philadelphia Union II	Loudoun United FC
14	(Germany) Ben Lundt	Louisville City FC	Saint Louis FC
15	(United States) Diego Restrepo	Austin Bold FC	San Antonio FC

Team of the Week
Week	Goalkeeper	Defenders	Midfielders	Forwards	Bench
**1**	(United States) Miller (CLT)	(United States) Cuevas (LAG) (United States) Nelson (CHS) (Canada) Montgomery (SAN)	(United States) Wharton (STL) (United States) Dunbar (LAG) (Haiti) François (RNO) (United States) Cicerone (STL)	(Canada) Pasher (IND) (Azerbaijan) **Dadashov** (PHX) (Ghana) Asante (PHX)	(El Salvador) Barahona (SAC) (El Salvador) Burgos (LVL) (Brazil) Fernandes (TBR) (Canada) Haworth (IND) (United States) Ketterer (ELP) (England) Lancaster (LOU) (Jamaica) Taylor (AUS)
**2**	No award				
**3**	(United States) Newton (IND)	(United States) Stoneman (SDG) (Trinidad and Tobago) Hackshaw (IND) (Ghana) Kontoh (PHX)	(Guyana) Dover (PGH) (United States) Muhammad (NMU) (Brazil) Fernandes (TBR) (United States) Mertz (PGH)	(Azerbaijan) Atuahene (SDG) (Canada) Pasher (IND) (Ghana) **Asante** (PHX)	(Spain) Ayoze (IND) (Jamaica) Flemmings (PHX) (United States) Mares (ELP) (Ghana) Mensah (PGH) (United States) Morton (STL) (South Africa) Moshobane (SDG) (United States) Wehan (NMU)
**4**	(Democratic Republic of the Congo) Mandanda (HAR)	(United States) Vázquez (LAG) (Rwanda) Kavita (STL) (England) Fox (ELP)	(Brazil) Taiberson (RGV) (United States) Griffin (PGH) (Brazil) **Lapa** (BHM) (Jamaica) Forbes (PGH)	(United States) Chavez (OKC) (Puerto Rico) Diaz (TAC) (Poland) Formella (SAC)	(Brazil) Fernandes (TBR) (United States) Morton (STL) (Canada) Pasher (IND) (United States) Robles (TAC) (Rwanda) Rwatubyaye (COS) (United States) Wehan (NMU) (Canada) Wright (BHM)
**5**	(United States) Morton (STL)	(United States) Crognale (BHM) (United States) Gdula (CHS) (Republic of Ireland) Kiernan (OCO)	(Germany) Fall (STL) (United States) Barrera (HAR) (England) **Corfe** (NYR) (Argentina) Parano (SAN) (Brazil) Torres (HAR)	(South Africa) Moshobane (SDG) (United States) Sandoval (NMU)	(United States) Kempin (SDG) (England) Lancaster (LOU) (El Salvador) Moreno (NMU) (Canada) Pasher (IND) (United States) Quinn (OCO) (Guatemala) Rittmeyer (CHS) (Sierra Leone) Williams (LAG)
**6**	(United States) Thompson (SKC)	(United States) Taylor (NCA) (Canada) Ouimette (IND) (United States) Peay (SLC)	(United States) Wehan (NMU) (United States) Barrera (HAR) (Jamaica) Forbes (PGH) (Haiti) **François** (RNO)	(Argentina) Solignac (SAN) (Senegal) Diop (ATL) (Azerbaijan) Dadashov (PHX)	(United States) Dick (PHX) (Republic of Ireland) Doherty (TBR) (Uruguay) Guenzatti (TBR) (England) Heath (MIA) (Guyana) Marsh-Brown (MEM) (Cuba) Martínez (TUL) (Trinidad and Tobago) Powder (SLC)
**7**	(United States) De La Cerda (RNO)	(The Gambia) Jome (AUS) (United States) Ward (NCA) (United States) Dean (BHM)	(United States) Mertz (PGH) (Argentina) Parano (SAN) (United States) McGlynn (PHI) (United States) Herrera (ELP)	(Jamaica) **Flemmings** (PHX) (Jamaica) Brett (BHM) (Puerto Rico) Diaz (TAC)	(Ghana) Asante (PHX) (United States) Cochran (PHX) (Puerto Rico) Hilton (TBR) (Mexico) Luna (COS) (Ghana) Mensah (PGH) (United States) Sargis (SAC) (Greece) Tambakis (NCA)
**8**	(United States) Newton (IND)	(United States) King (PHX) (Haiti) Apollon (SAC) (United States) Yearwood (NMU)	(United States) Crognale (BHM) (United States) Quinn (OCO) (Bermuda) **Lewis** (CHS) (Mexico) Baez (AUS)	(Jamaica) Kelly (CLT) (Poland) Formella (SAC) (United States) Hertzog (RNO)	(United States) Barrera (HFD) (United States) Cicerone (STL) (Denmark) Due (OCO) (United States) Iwasa (SAC) (Canada) Johnson (TBR) (England) Lancaster (LOU) (Scotland) Ross (ELP)
**9**	(United States) Vitiello (PGH)	(United States) McCrary (SAC) (Grenada) Paterson (CHS) (United States) Taintor (SAN)	(United States) Bone (RNO) (France) Ekra (TBR) (United States) Bone (LOU) (El Salvador) Moreno (NMU)	(Jamaica) Williams (MIA) (Ghana) **Asante** (PHX) (Senegal) Diouf (AUS)	(Mexico) Estrada (NMU) (Jamaica) Flemmings (PHX) (United States) Frischknecht (LVL) (El Salvador) Granitto (MIA) (United States) Harris (SKC) (United States) Miller (CLT) (Northern Ireland) Palmer (OCO)
**10**	(United States) Miller (LDN)	(United States) Serna (SKC) (United States) Gdula (CHS) (Canada) **James** (PGH)	(United States) Smith (SAN) (United States) LaCava (NYR) (Colombia) Rebellón (ELP) (Puerto Rico) Servania (BHM)	(Sierra Leone) Williams (LAG) (Turks and Caicos Islands) Forbes (AUS) (United States) Hertzog (RNO)	(Niger) Amoustapha (LDN) (Jamaica) Brett (BHM) (Guyana) Dover (PGH) (United States) Frischknecht (LVL) (United States) Parker (BHM) (United States) Totsch (LOU) (United States) Volesky (COS)
**11**	(United States) Miller (CLT)	(Brazil) Torres (HAR) (Jamaica) Scarlett (TBR) (United States) Mahoney (SAC)	(United States) C. Bone (LOU) (United States) Mertz (PGH) (United States) Mares (ELP) (United States) T. Bone (RNO)	(United States) Okoli (OCO) (Cuba) Suárez (TUL) (Jamaica) **Kelly** (CLT)	(Trinidad and Tobago) Fortune (NCA) (England) Gleadle (RNO) (Uruguay) Guenzatti (TBR) (United States) Harris (SKC) (Cuba) Martínez (TUL) (Mexico) Perez (LAG) (United States) Vitiello (PGH)
**12**	(France) **Lefebvre** (LDN)	(United States) Martin (SDG) (United States) Yearwood (NMU) (England) Fox (ELP)	(Canada) James (PGH) (United States) Areman (CLT) (United States) Guido (SDG) (France) Hoppenot (LOU)	(The Gambia) Sowe (NYR) (Cuba) Suárez (TUL) (Azerbaijan) Dadashov (PHX)	(Grenada) Belmar (SAC) (Spain) Berry (SDG) (United States) Hundley (MEM) (Jamaica) Kelly (CLT) (United States) Leeker (POR) (Ghana) Mensah (PGH) (El Salvador) Moreno (NMU)
**13**	(Mexico) Romero (LAG)	(United States) Lasso (TBR) (United States) Crognale (BHM) (United States) Fink (STL) (United States) Maund (CLT)	(United States) Ownby (LOU) (Spain) Gonzalez (POR) (Haiti) François (RNO)	(England) Lancaster (LOU) (Guatemala) **Rubin** (SDG) (United States) Dixon (HFD)	(Morocco) Boudadi (RNO) (Jamaica) Brett (BHM) (United States) Cardone (SAN) (United States) Epps (POR) (Jamaica) Flemmings (PHX) (Canada) Perruzza (SAN) (Sierra Leone) Williams (LAG)
**14**	(Puerto Rico) **Laurendi** (OKC)	(Jamaica) McFarlane (AUS) (Israel) Keinan (SAC) (Spain) Ayoze (IND)	(United States) Bird (TUL) (Jamaica) Williams (LOU) (United States) McGlynn (PHI) (Spain) Gonzalez (POR)	(The Gambia) Sowe (NYR) (United States) Jennings (MEM) (United States) Bashti (ATL)	(United States) Conway (ATL) (United States) Cuevas (LAG) (Azerbaijan) Dadashov (PHX) (Trinidad and Tobago) Fortune (NCA) (Uruguay) Guenzatti (TBR) (United States) Mizell (NMU) (Honduras) Sandoval (LVL)
**15**	(Dominican Republic) Díaz (SAC)	(Spain) Yuma (ELP) (Haiti) Lacroix (CLT) (England) Reynolds (TAC)	(Canada) Kibato (RGV) (Scotland) Stanton (PHX) (Poland) Formella (SAC) (Colombia) Velásquez (MIA)	(United States) **Jennings** (MEM) (United States) Hoffman (OCO) (Sierra Leone) Williams (LAG)	(Brazil) da Costa (TUL) (Germany) Fall (STL) (United States) Miller (CLT) (Haiti) Mompremier (SKC) (Ghana) Twumasi (AUS) (Nigeria) Uzo (TUL) (Greece) Zarokostas (CHS)
**Bold** denotes Player of the Week
