= Simon Lefebvre =

French footballer (born 1997)

Personal information
- Full name: Simon Lefebvre
- Date of birth: May 6, 1997 (age 29)
- Place of birth: Ossun, France
- Height: 6 ft 9 in (2.06 m)
- Position: Goalkeeper

Team information
- Current team: AS Muret

Youth career
- 2010–2016: Bordeaux

College career
Years	Team	Apps	(Gls)
2018–2019	Temple Owls	35	(0)

Senior career*
Years	Team	Apps	(Gls)
2015–2016	Bordeaux	0	(0)
2015–2016	Bordeaux II	10	(0)
2016–2017	Forest Green Rovers	0	(0)
2016	→ Bishop's Stortford (loan)	2	(0)
2019	Reading United	1	(0)
2020	Loudoun United	6	(0)
2021	Louisville City	0	(0)
2021	→ Colorado Springs Switchbacks (loan)	0	(0)
2022–	AS Muret	8	(0)
- * Club domestic league appearances and goals as of 28 December 2022

Simon Lefebvre (born 6 May 1997) is a French footballer who plays as a goalkeeper for AS Muret.

== Career ==
=== Europe ===
Lefebvre joined the Bordeaux academy in 2010, where he played until 2016. Lefebvre appeared on the bench twice for the first team in August 2015, but never made a first team appearance.

Following his release from Bordeaux and a trial with Birmingham City, on 25 July 2016 Lefebvre joined National League side Forest Green Rovers on a two-year deal. On 1 December 2016, he made a one-month loan to fellow National League side Bishop's Stortford. Lefebvre left Forest Green on 25 July 2017, without making a first team appearance for the club.

=== United States ===
In 2018, Lefebvre moved to the United States to play college soccer at Temple University. In two seasons with the Owls, Lefebvre made 35 appearances and in 2019, he was named All-AAC Second Team.

Whilst at college, Lefebvre also spent time with USL League Two side Reading United AC, where he made a single regular season appearance for them, as well as four appearances in the play-offs.

On 9 January 2020, Lefebvre was drafted 21st overall in the 2020 MLS SuperDraft by D.C. United. On 3 March 2020, he signed with D.C. United's USL Championship affiliate side Loudoun United. He made his debut for Loudoun on 23 August 2020, starting against Hartford Athletic, a game that ended in a 2–2 draw.

Lefebvre signed with Louisville City FC on 5 January 2021.

In September 2021, Lefebvre reunited with Brendan Burke, his coach at Reading United, by joining Colorado Springs Switchbacks FC on a loan deal.

Following the 2021 season, Louisville opted to decline their contract option on Lefebvre.
