= Stavros Zarokostas =

Greek footballer (born 1997)

Personal information
- Date of birth: 5 November 1997 (age 29)
- Place of birth: Leonidio, Greece
- Height: 1.70 m (5 ft 7 in)
- Position: Forward

Team information
- Current team: One Knoxville
- Number: 21

College career
Years	Team	Apps	(Gls)
2016–2019	Rhode Island Rams	74	(28)

Senior career*
Years	Team	Apps	(Gls)
2018–2019	Rhode Island Reds	6	(3)
2020–2021	Charleston Battery	41	(8)
2022–2023	FC Haka	47	(9)
2024	Egaleo	6	(0)
2024–	One Knoxville	60	(4)
- * Club domestic league appearances and goals as of October 31, 2026

Stavros Zarokostas (Greek: Σταύρος Ζαροκώστας) (born 5 November 1997) is a Greek professional footballer who plays as a forward for USL League One club One Knoxville.

== Career ==
=== Charleston Battery ===
Zarokostas was selected by the New York Red Bulls in the 3rd round (62nd overall) of the 2020 MLS SuperDraft, however he wasn't signed by the club. In May 2020, Zarokostas signed with USL Championship club Charleston Battery. He made his league debut for the club on 19 July 2020, coming on as a 79th-minute substitute for Nicque Daley in a 2–1 home defeat to the Birmingham Legion.

=== Haka ===
On 31 January 2022, Zarokostas signed a contract with FC Haka in Finland for the 2022 season, with an option for 2023.
