= Malik Johnson (soccer) =

Canadian soccer player

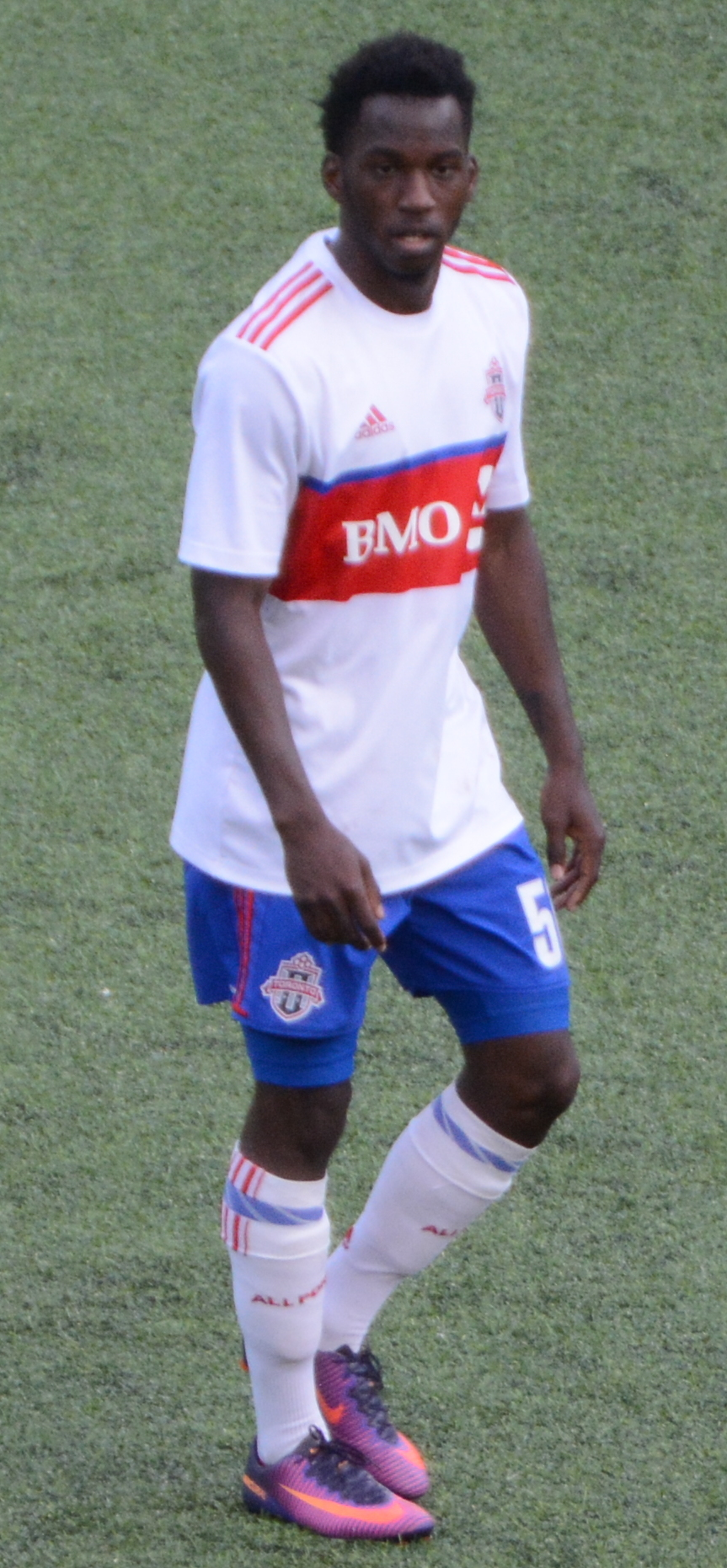
- Johnson playing for Toronto FC II in 2017

Personal information
- Full name: Malik Anthony Johnson
- Date of birth: April 13, 1998 (age 28)
- Place of birth: Toronto, Ontario, Canada
- Height: 1.75 m (5 ft 9 in)
- Positions: Midfielder; forward

Youth career
- 2004: Brampton East SC
- 2013–2015: Toronto FC

Senior career*
Years	Team	Apps	(Gls)
2015–2017	Toronto FC III	7	(1)
2015–2018	Toronto FC II	75	(7)
2016	→ Toronto FC (loan)	0	(0)
2018	→ Toronto FC (loan)	0	(0)
2019–2020	Tampa Bay Rowdies	33	(5)
2021	Real Monarchs	31	(1)
2022	Colorado Springs Switchbacks	18	(1)

International career^{‡}
2015	Canada U17	4	(0)
2017	Canada U20	2	(0)
- * Club domestic league appearances and goals as of July 9, 2022 ‡ National team caps and goals as of March 23, 2016

Malik Anthony Johnson (born April 13, 1998) is a Canadian soccer player.

== Career ==
=== Club ===
==== Toronto FC II ====
Johnson joined TFC Academy in 2013 from Brampton East SC. Johnson made his debut for Toronto FC II on July 8, 2015, against the Pittsburgh Riverhounds as an academy call-up. He would go on to sign his first professional contract with Toronto FC II on January 5, 2016.

He was called up to the Toronto FC squad on June 2, 2016, and made his debut in the Canadian Championship semi-finals. Johnson played in the final 10 minutes of a 4–2 win against Montreal Impact after replacing Mo Babouli. During the 2017 offseason, Johnson would train with Danish club HB Køge. Upon completion of the 2017 season, Toronto FC II would exercise the option on Johnson's contract for the 2018 season.

==== Tampa Bay Rowdies ====
After four seasons with Toronto FC II, Johnson would sign with fellow USL Championship club Tampa Bay Rowdies for the 2019 season. After missing the first two months of the season with a shoulder injury Johnson would make 23 starts and score 3 goals for the Rowdies in 2019, impressing coach Neill Collins during his first season in Tampa Bay. He would re-sign with the club for the 2020 season.

==== Real Monarchs ====
On January 29, 2021, Johnson joined USL Championship side Real Monarchs.

=== Colorado Springs Switchbacks ===
On December 11, 2021, it was announced Johnson would join USL Championship side Colorado Springs Switchbacks ahead of their 2022 season. After the 2022 season, the Switchbacks retained Johnson for the 2023 season, however, prior to the season in March he and the club agreed to mutually terminated his contract.

=== International ===
Johnson was born in Canada to Jamaican parents. He was named to the U15 national team for the 2013 Copa de México de Naciones. Johnson was called up by coach Sean Fleming to the Canada U-17 team for the 2015 CONCACAF U-17 Championship. He made his debut for the U17s against the Haiti U-17 squad on February 28 as a substitute in the 74th minute. Johnson was named to the Canadian U-23 provisional roster for the 2020 CONCACAF Men's Olympic Qualifying Championship on February 26, 2020.

== Career statistics ==
As of July 9, 2022

Club	League	Season	League		Playoffs		Domestic Cup (Note: Includes Canadian Championship and U.S. Open Cup.)		Total	
Club	League	Season	Apps	Goals	Apps	Goals	Apps	Goals	Apps	Goals
Toronto FC III	PDL	2015	4	0	—		—		4	0
Toronto FC III	League1 Ontario	2017	3	1	0	0	—		3	1
Toronto FC III	Total		7	1	0	0	0	0	7	1
Toronto FC II	USL	2015	7	0	—		—		7	0
Toronto FC II	USL	2016	21	4	—		—		21	4
Toronto FC II	USL	2017	19	1	—		—		19	1
Toronto FC II	USL	2018	28	2	—		—		28	2
Toronto FC II	Total		75	7	0	0	0	0	75	7
Toronto FC	MLS	2016	0	0	0	0	1	0	1	0
Toronto FC	MLS	2018	0	0	—		1	0	1	0
Toronto FC	Total		0	0	0	0	2	0	2	0
Tampa Bay Rowdies	USL Championship	2019	23	3	0	0	1	0	24	3
Tampa Bay Rowdies	USL Championship	2020	10	2	3	0	0	0	13	2
Tampa Bay Rowdies	Total		33	5	3	0	1	0	37	5
Real Monarchs	USL Championship	2021	31	1	0	0	0	0	31	1
Colorado Springs Switchbacks	USL Championship	2022	18	1	0	0	1	0	19	1
Career Total			164	15	3	0	4	0	171	15
