= Dominic Oduro (footballer, born 1995) =

Ghanaian footballer (born 1995)

Personal information
- Date of birth: 23 January 1995 (age 31)
- Place of birth: Ghana
- Height: 1.70 m (5 ft 7 in)
- Positions: Full-back; midfielder

Youth career
- –2011: Right to Dream Academy
- 2011–2013: Manchester City

Senior career*
Years	Team	Apps	(Gls)
2013–2015	Manchester City	0	(0)
2013–2014	→ AGF (loan)	13	(1)
2014	→ Mouscron (loan)	1	(0)
2015	→ IK Frej (loan)	12	(0)
2016	Nordsjælland	2	(0)
2017–2018	FC Golden State Force	18	(1)
2018–2020	Tampa Bay Rowdies	57	(1)
2021	Memphis 901	29	(0)
2022	Charleston Battery	27	(0)
- * Club domestic league appearances and goals as of 15:00, 17 October 2022 (UTC)

Dominic Oduro (born 23 January 1995) is a Ghanaian professional footballer who plays as a full-back or midfielder.

== Club career ==
=== Early career and loan deals ===
Oduro joined Manchester City's youth academy from the Right to Dream Academy in his native Ghana in 2011. After a successful trial, he joined Danish Superliga club AGF in January 2013 on loan for 18 months. He made his debut for the club in a 2–0 win against FC Vestsjælland on 27 July.

Oduro was selected in the second round as the 44th overall draft pick by Seattle Sounders FC in the MLS SuperDraft on 13 January 2017. However, he was cut during preseason.

=== FC Golden State Force ===
Oduro signed with fourth-tier Premier Development League side FC Golden State Force in April 2017. During his first season with the club, he made 13 regular season appearances. Oduro was part of the 2018 FC Golden State Force team that made a deep run in the 2018 U.S. Open Cup, defeating two USL teams before falling to the LA Galaxy.

In February 2018, it was announced that Oduro was on trial with Pittsburgh Riverhounds SC of the United Soccer League.

=== Tampa Bay Rowdies ===
Oduro signed with USL side Tampa Bay Rowdies on 20 June 2018.

Oduro scored a game-tying goal in the final minute of his debut with Tampa Bay against Charlotte Independence on 27 June 2018. The highlight reel-worthy goal received recognition as an ESPN SportsCenter Top 10 Play, and was nominated as USL's Goal of the Month. Oduro would follow that up with an assist in Tampa Bay's 3–1 victory over Toronto FC II in the following game. Oduro went on to make 18 starts over the course of his debut season.

Oduro remained a key piece of the Rowdies midfield in 2019, helping the team to a 13-game unbeaten streak to start the season. Head coach Neill Collins praised Oduro's performance in July 2019, stating, “He was exactly what we were looking for. He was able to go and do the dirty work, go and cut things off, win tackles.” Oduro finished the season with 27 league starts, helping Tampa Bay to an Eastern Conference playoff berth.

=== Memphis 901 ===
On 10 May 2021, it was announced that Oduro had signed with USL Championship side Memphis 901.

=== Charleston Battery ===
On January 19, 2022, Oduro signed for USL Championship side Charleston Battery. Following the 2022 season, Oduro was released by Charleston.
