= Jordan Doherty =

Irish association football player

Personal information
- Full name: Jordan Doherty
- Date of birth: 29 August 2000 (age 26)
- Place of birth: Balbriggan, Ireland
- Height: 1.81 m (5 ft 11 in)
- Positions: Midfielder; defender

Team information
- Current team: Livingston

Youth career
- Balscadden
- 2007–2015: Home Farm
- 2015–2019: Sheffield United

Senior career*
Years	Team	Apps	(Gls)
2019–2020	Sheffield United	0	(0)
2019	→ Tampa Bay Rowdies (loan)	19	(0)
2020–2021	Tampa Bay Rowdies	42	(2)
2022	Bohemians	32	(1)
2023–2024	Tampa Bay Rowdies	65	(1)
2025–2026	Raith Rovers	49	(1)
2026–	Livingston	0	(0)

International career^{‡}
2017	Republic of Ireland U17	3	(1)
2017	Republic of Ireland U18	2	(0)
2017–2018	Republic of Ireland U19	7	(1)
- * Club domestic league appearances and goals as of 4 May 2026 ‡ National team caps and goals as of 12 March 2019

Jordan Doherty (born 29 August 2000) is an Irish professional footballer who plays as a midfielder or defender for Livingston.

== Career ==
After spending the 2019 season on loan with the Tampa Bay Rowdies, Doherty joined the team on a permanent basis on 24 January 2020. Following the 2021 season it was announced that Doherty would leave the Rowdies. Doherty signed with Irish club Bohemians in December 2021.

Doherty returned to the Rowdies on 12 January 2023. He left Tampa Bay following their 2024 season.

He signed for Livingston in May 2026.

== Career statistics ==
As of match played 2 November 2024

Appearances and goals by club, season and competition
Club	Season	League			National cup (Note: Includes U.S. Open Cup, FAI Cup)		Total	
Club	Season	Division	Apps	Goals	Apps	Goals	Apps	Goals
Tampa Bay Rowdies (loan)	2019	USL Championship	19	0	1	0	20	0
Tampa Bay Rowdies	2020	USL Championship	19	2	0	0	19	2
Tampa Bay Rowdies	2021	USL Championship	30	0	0	0	30	0
Tampa Bay Rowdies	Total		49	2	0	0	49	2
Bohemians	2022	LOI Premier Division	32	1	1	0	33	1
Tampa Bay Rowdies	2023	USL Championship	34	0	2	0	36	0
Tampa Bay Rowdies	2024	USL Championship	33	1	2	0	35	1
Tampa Bay Rowdies	Total		67	1	4	0	71	1
Career total			167	4	6	0	173	4

== Honours ==
Raith Rovers

- Scottish Challenge Cup: 2025–26
