= Nicque Daley =

Jamaican footballer (born 2000)

Personal information
- Date of birth: 19 October 2000 (age 26)
- Place of birth: Kingston, Jamaica
- Height: 5 ft 8 in (1.73 m)
- Position: Forward

Senior career*
Years	Team	Apps	(Gls)
2018–2019	Cavalier	14	(2)
2019–2022	Charleston Battery	61	(16)
2022	→ FC Cincinnati 2 (loan)	16	(1)

International career^{‡}
2016–2017	Jamaica U17	6	(0)
2018	Jamaica U20	5	(6)
2019	Jamaica U23	2	(1)
- * Club domestic league appearances and goals as of 9 November 2022 ‡ National team caps and goals as of 29 April 2019

Nicque Daley (born 19 October 2000) is a Jamaican professional footballer who plays as a forward.

== Early life and education ==
Daley attended Clarendon College in Jamaica.

== Career ==
=== Club ===
On 22 March 2019, Daley joined USL Championship side Charleston Battery on a four-year deal after playing with Cavalier SC in his native Jamaica. Following the 2022 season, Daley was released by Charleston.

=== International ===
Daley played for Jamaica under-20 national team in 2018 and the under-23 team in 2019.
