= Arthur Bosua =

South African soccer player (born 1996)

Personal information
- Date of birth: 26 January 1996 (age 30)
- Place of birth: Johannesburg, South Africa
- Height: 1.91 m (6 ft 3 in)
- Position: Forward

College career
Years	Team	Apps	(Gls)
2014–2017	Columbia Lions	63	(27)

Senior career*
Years	Team	Apps	(Gls)
2017–2018	Long Island Rough Riders	15	(7)
2019–2020	Charleston Battery	40	(9)
2021	New Amsterdam	16	(6)
2022–2023	South Georgia Tormenta	30	(3)
2024	Richmond Kickers	12	(0)
Total		113	(25)
- * Club domestic league appearances and goals

Arthur Bosua (born 26 January 1996) is a South African former soccer player who played as a forward.

== Early life and education ==
Bosua grew up in Johannesburg, South Africa before moving to Dix Hills, New York as a child where he played soccer at Half Hollow Hills West High School and for Albertson Academy. While at Half Hollow Hills West, he was an All-League, Division, and County player, as well as Rookie of the Year in soccer. Bosua was ranked as a four-star recruit by Top Drawer Soccer. He committed to play college soccer at Columbia University on 19 June 2013.

Bosua attended Columbia University, where he played college soccer as a forward for the Columbia Lions from 2014 to 2017, tallying a total of 27 goals and 12 assists in 63 appearances. During his time at Columbia, Bosua was an Ivy League champion, a Second Team All-American, a two-time Ivy League Offensive Player of the Year, and a three-time First Team All-Ivy honoree.

While in college, he played in the PDL with the Long Island Rough Riders.

== Professional career ==
After his senior season, Bosua was one of 60 college players invited to the 2018 MLS Combine. He was not selected by a team in the 2018 MLS SuperDraft. A year after going un-drafted, Bosua went on trial with the Charleston Battery of the USL. After a successful trial, he signed his first professional soccer contract with the Charleston Battery in March 2019.

Bosua made his professional debut on 9 March 2019, coming on as a 75th minute substitute in a 1–1 tie against the Ottawa Fury. He made his first professional start and scored his first professional goal on 19 April 2019, in a 3–1 victory against Nashville SC.

In May 2021, Bosua joined National Independent Soccer Association side New Amsterdam FC.

On 21 February 2022, Bosua signed with USL League One club South Georgia Tormenta ahead of their 2022 season.

Bosua joined the Richmond Kickers of USL League One on 16 January 2024.

On 1 December 2024 Bosua, left the Kickers when his contract expired and on 10 December, Bosua announced his retirement from professional football.

== Honors ==
=== Individual ===
- Ivy League Offensive Player of the Year: 2016, 2017
- NSCAA All-East Region First Team: 2016, 2017
- First Team All-Ivy: 2015, 2016, 2017
- NSCAA Second Team All-American: 2017

=== Club ===
- Columbia
  - 2016 Ivy League Champion
