= A. J. Paterson =

Grenadian footballer (born 1996)

Personal information
- Full name: Arthur Precious Paterson Jr.
- Date of birth: 31 January 1996 (age 30)
- Place of birth: Key Largo, Florida, United States
- Height: 1.88 m (6 ft 2 in)
- Positions: Midfielder; defender

Team information
- Current team: Birmingham Legion
- Number: 20

College career
Years	Team	Apps	(Gls)
2014–2017	Wright State Raiders	76	(15)

Senior career*
Years	Team	Apps	(Gls)
2016	SW Florida Adrenaline	10	(2)
2018	Bethlehem Steel	1	(0)
2019–2023	Charleston Battery	102	(7)
2024–	Birmingham Legion	53	(4)

International career^{‡}
2018–	Grenada	21	(4)
- * Club domestic league appearances and goals as of 23:43, 3 November 2026 (UTC) ‡ National team caps and goals as of 12:39, 31 March 2023 (UTC)

Arthur Precious Paterson Jr. (born 31 January 1996) is a professional footballer who currently plays as a midfielder for Birmingham Legion in the USL Championship. Born in the United States, he plays for the Grenada national team.

== Career ==
=== College ===
Paterson spent his entire college career at Wright State University. He made a total of 76 appearances for the Raiders and tallied 15 goals and seven assists. During his senior year at Wright State, he was named; USC First Team All-Great Lakes Region, Horizon League Player for the Year, First Team All-Horizon League, and OCSA First Team All-State.

While at college, Paterson played for Premier Development League side SW Florida Adrenaline during their 2016 season.

=== Professional ===
On January 19, 2018, Paterson was selected 42nd overall in the 2018 MLS SuperDraft by the New York City FC. However, he was not signed by the club.

On February 19, 2018, he signed with USL club Bethlehem Steel FC. He made his professional debut on March 24, 2018, starting in a 2–0 loss against Tampa Bay Rowdies.

Bethlehem Steel released Paterson at the end of the 2018 season.

Paterson joined USL Championship side Charleston Battery on March 8, 2019. He left Charleston following the 2023 season.

Paterson signed with Birmingham Legion in December 2023.

=== International ===
In October 2018, Paterson received his first international call-up to the Grenada national team ahead of the CONCACAF Nations League qualification match against Cuba. Paterson is eligible to play for Grenada via his father. Paterson made his debut for Grenada in a 1-0 CONCACAF Nations League loss to Cuba national football team on 12 October 2018.

=== International goals ===
Scores and results list Grenada's goal tally first.

No.	Date	Venue	Opponent	Score	Result	Competition
1.	16 November 2018	Kirani James Athletic Stadium, St. George's, Grenada	Saint Martin	4–1	5–2	2019–20 CONCACAF Nations League qualification
2.	16 November 2018	Kirani James Athletic Stadium, St. George's, Grenada	Saint Martin	5–2	5–2	2019–20 CONCACAF Nations League qualification
3.	24 March 2019	Juan Ramón Loubriel Stadium, Bayamón, Puerto Rico	Puerto Rico	2–0	2–0	2019–20 CONCACAF Nations League qualification
4.	8 September 2019	Isidoro Beaton Stadium, Belmopan, Belize	Belize	1–1	2–1	2019–20 CONCACAF Nations League B
