= Forrest Lasso =

American soccer player (born 1993)

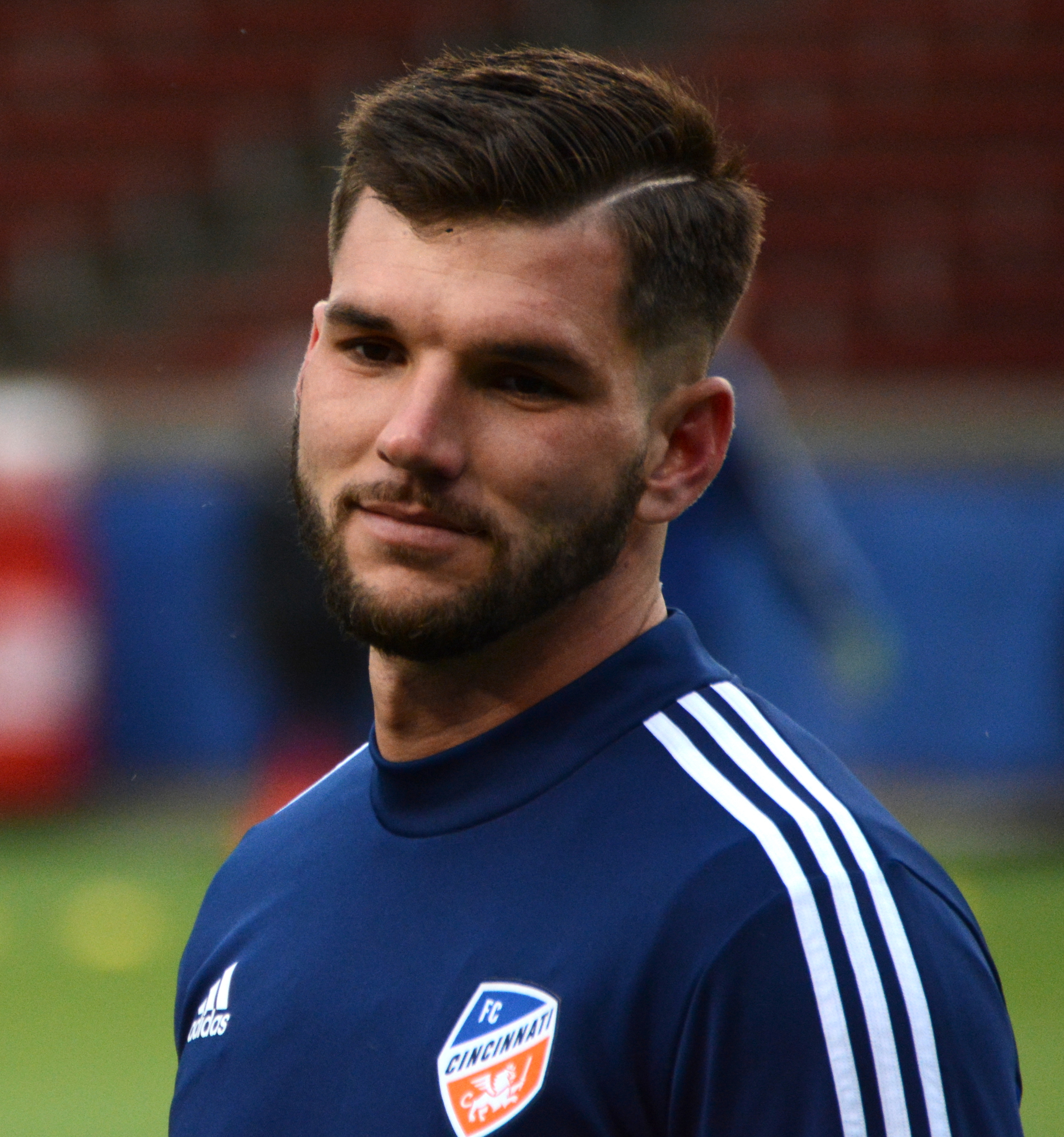
- Lasso with FC Cincinnati in 2019

Personal information
- Full name: Forrest Baldwin Lasso
- Date of birth: May 11, 1993 (age 33)
- Place of birth: Raleigh, North Carolina, United States
- Height: 6 ft 5 in (1.96 m)
- Position: Defender

Youth career
- 2002–2011: Capital Area Soccer League

College career
Years	Team	Apps	(Gls)
2011–2014	Wofford Terriers	71	(14)

Senior career*
Years	Team	Apps	(Gls)
2013	GPS Portland Phoenix		
2015–2017	Charleston Battery	53	(7)
2018–2019	FC Cincinnati	34	(3)
2019	→ Nashville SC (loan)	12	(1)
2020–2021	Tampa Bay Rowdies	48	(4)
2022	GIF Sundsvall	22	(0)
2023–2025	Tampa Bay Rowdies	56	(3)
Signature
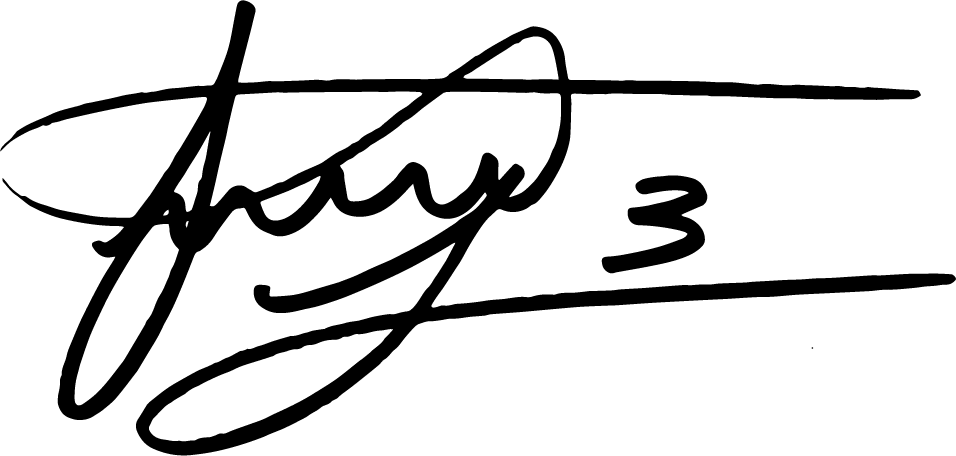
- * Club domestic league appearances and goals as of October 25, 2025

Forrest Baldwin Lasso (born May 11, 1993) is an American former soccer player who played for USL Championship club Tampa Bay Rowdies.

== Early life ==
Lasso played high school soccer at Needham B. Broughton High School. During his sophomore, junior, and senior seasons, Lasso won conference championships, which advanced the team to the state tournament those years. Lasso was selected to the All-CAP 8 Conference team following his junior and senior years and the All-Region team his senior year.

== Career ==
=== College ===
Lasso played college soccer at Wofford College as a center back. During his time at Wofford College, Lasso started in each of the 71 games he played in for the Terriers over his four-year collegiate career. Lasso totaled 14 goals and 8 assists for 36 points during his time at Wofford College. Four of Lasso's goals were game winners, including a header to clinch the 2013 Southern Conference regular season championship over #14 Furman University. Lasso also earned Southern Conference honors all four years of his career for being named to the 2011 Socon All-Freshman Team, the 2012 and 2013 Second Teams, 2013 All-South Region Third Team, 2014 SoCon First Team, and 2014 All-South Region First Team. Lasso also received Third Team All-America honors from the NSCAA. Lasso is the fifth Wofford men's soccer player to earn All-America honors, joining Nick Schuermann as the only other Terrier to earn All-America honors in the Division I era.

According to Lasso's personal website, he played for the Premier Development League side GPS Portland Phoenix in Portland, Maine in the summer of 2013.

=== Professional ===
In February 2015, Lasso was invited to try out for the Charleston Battery of the USL. According to coach Michael Anhaeuser, the team was initially more interested in another defender, but were ultimately impressed by Lasso; Anhaeuser later said, "As the trials went on though, it became pretty clear that Forrest had that quality and work ethic that you're looking for." The club officially announced they had signed Lasso on February 20. According to a Southern Conference press release, Lasso was only the second Wofford Terriers men's soccer player in recent history to go professional, the first being Thomas Hunter.

On April 1, 2017, Lasso earned a spot on the USL Team of the Week for the first time in his career after scoring the lone goal in a 1–0 win against Charlotte Independence. At the end of the season, Lasso was one of four defenders named to the 2017 All-League First Team. In the article announcing the team, USLSoccer.com noted that Lasso ranked in the top five for both blocked shots (27) and goals scored by a defender (6).

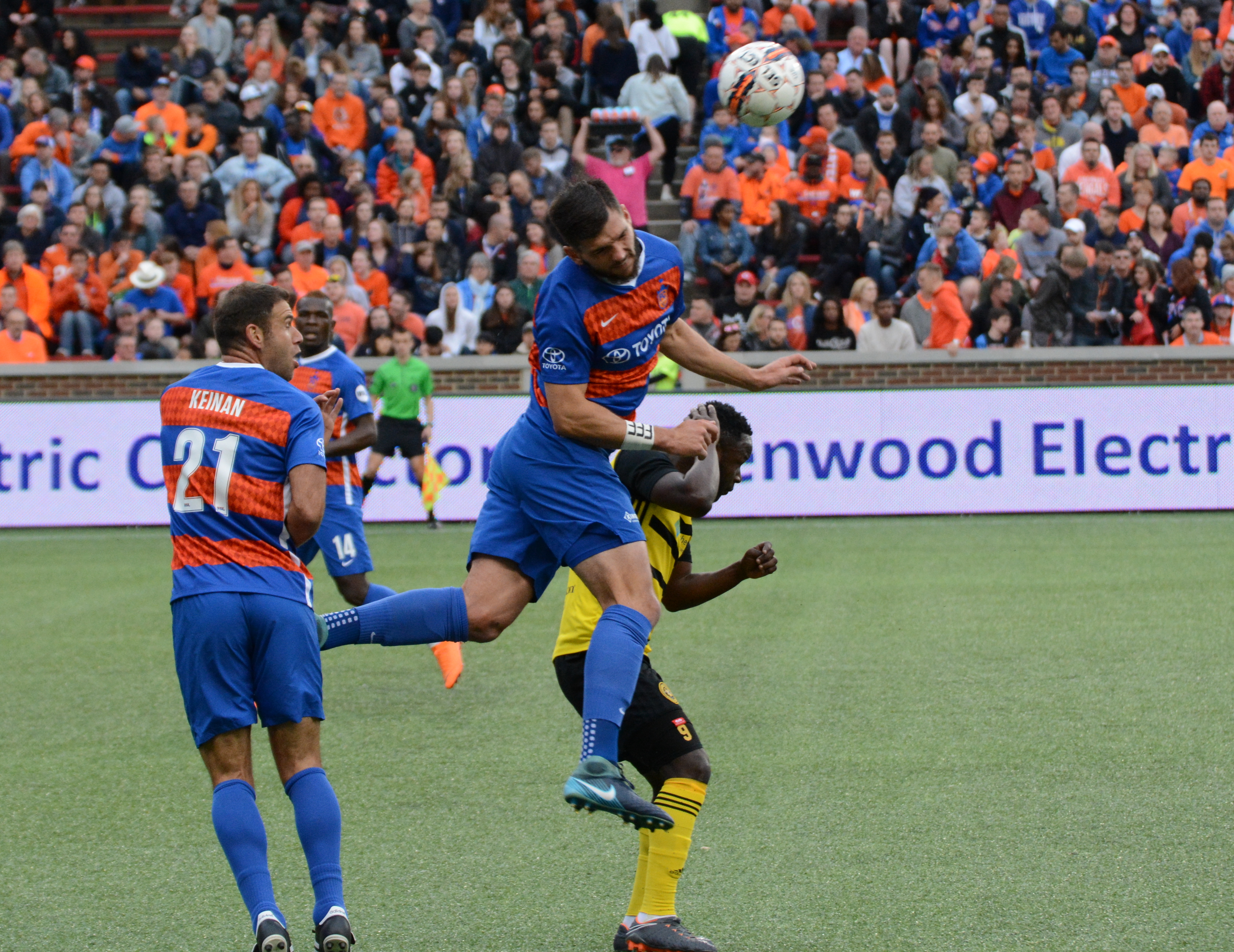
Lasso making a header for FC Cincinnati in 2018

Lasso signed with FC Cincinnati ahead of the 2018 USL season. He earned 29 appearances and 3 goals through his spell there. He was named USL Defender of the Year 2018, USL Best XI 2018 and played the most minutes for FC Cincinnati in their 2018 USL winning season.

On December 3, 2018, he signed with FC Cincinnati in Major League Soccer ahead of the 2019 season as the fourth signing. He made his Major League Soccer debut on March 24, 2019, when he played a full 90 minutes in an away win against New England Revolution.

On July 25, 2019, Lasso joined Nashville SC on loan for the remainder of the 2019 USL season.

On November 14, 2019, FC Cincinnati announced they would not take up Lasso's contract option at the end of their 2019 season.

Lasso signed with the Tampa Bay Rowdies on December 17, 2019. In two years with the Rowdies, the club twice won the USL Championship Eastern Conference and Lasso was named USL Defender of the Year both seasons.

In January 2022, Lasso signed with GIF Sundsvall in Sweden. Sundsvall won the Swedish Superettan in 2021 and signed Lasso ahead of their promotion to the Allsvenskan.

Lasso returned to the Rowdies on January 13, 2023. On December 5, 2024, the Rowdies announced that Lasso would be returning to the club for the 2025 season.

He retired following the 2025 season.

== Personal life ==
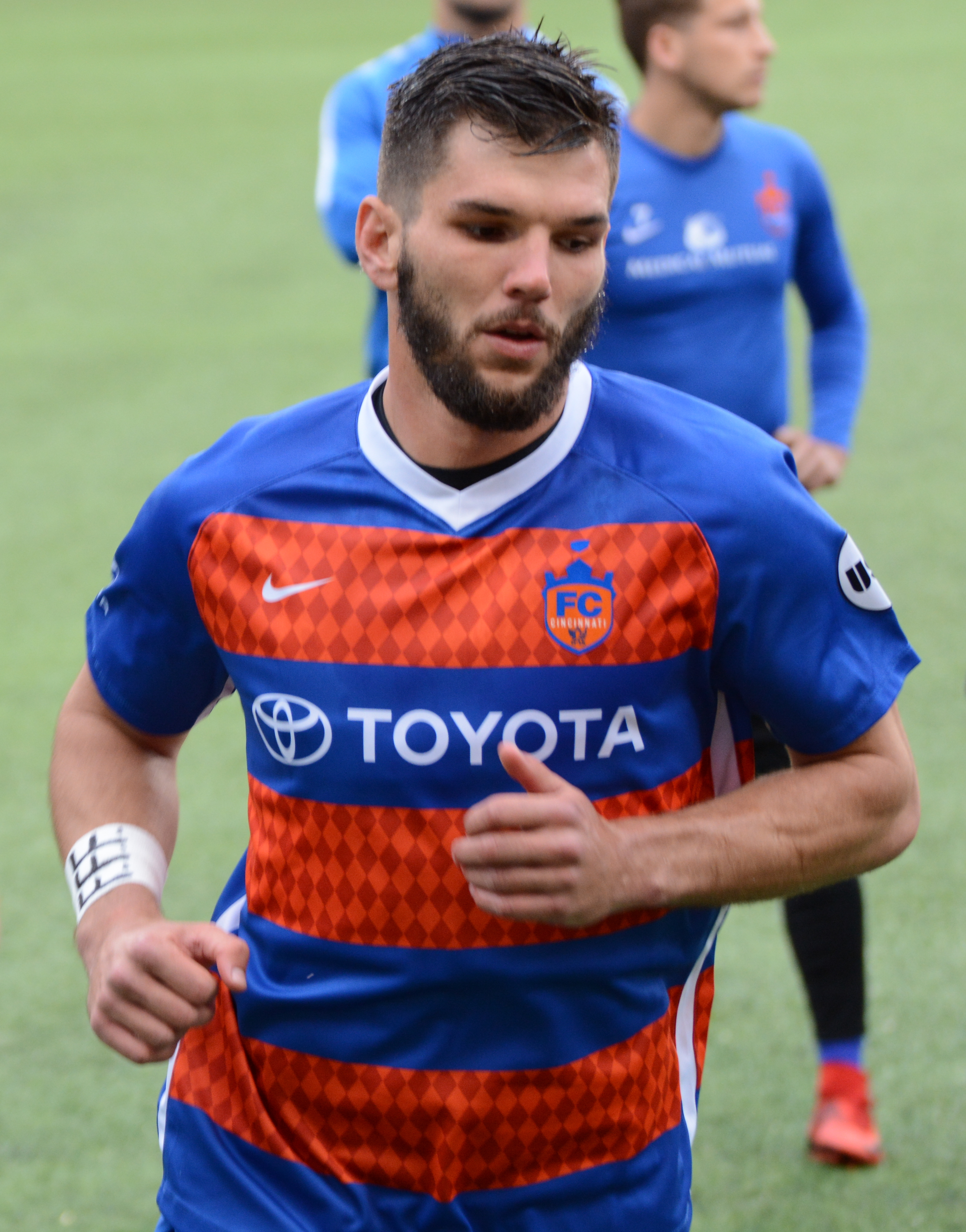
Lasso wearing an "F.F.F." wristband while warming up for a 2018 match

Since his professional debut, Lasso has always worn a taped wristband marked "F.F.F." during matches. The letters stands for "Faith, Family, Futbol", a personal motto that Lasso says represents what is most important to him. The motto was inspired by a speech that one of his coaches gave on the first day of training, when Lasso was in middle school and playing in the Capital Area Soccer League.

In the mid-2010's, Lasso and his father, Scott, discussed getting a tattoo. Years later, he got one: "Non Mi Calpestare", which is Italian for "Don't Tread On Me." He has told his fans that the inspiration behind the tattoo is his paternal grandfather, who was an Italian pirate.
