= Jordan Scarlett (footballer) =

Jamaican footballer (born 1995)

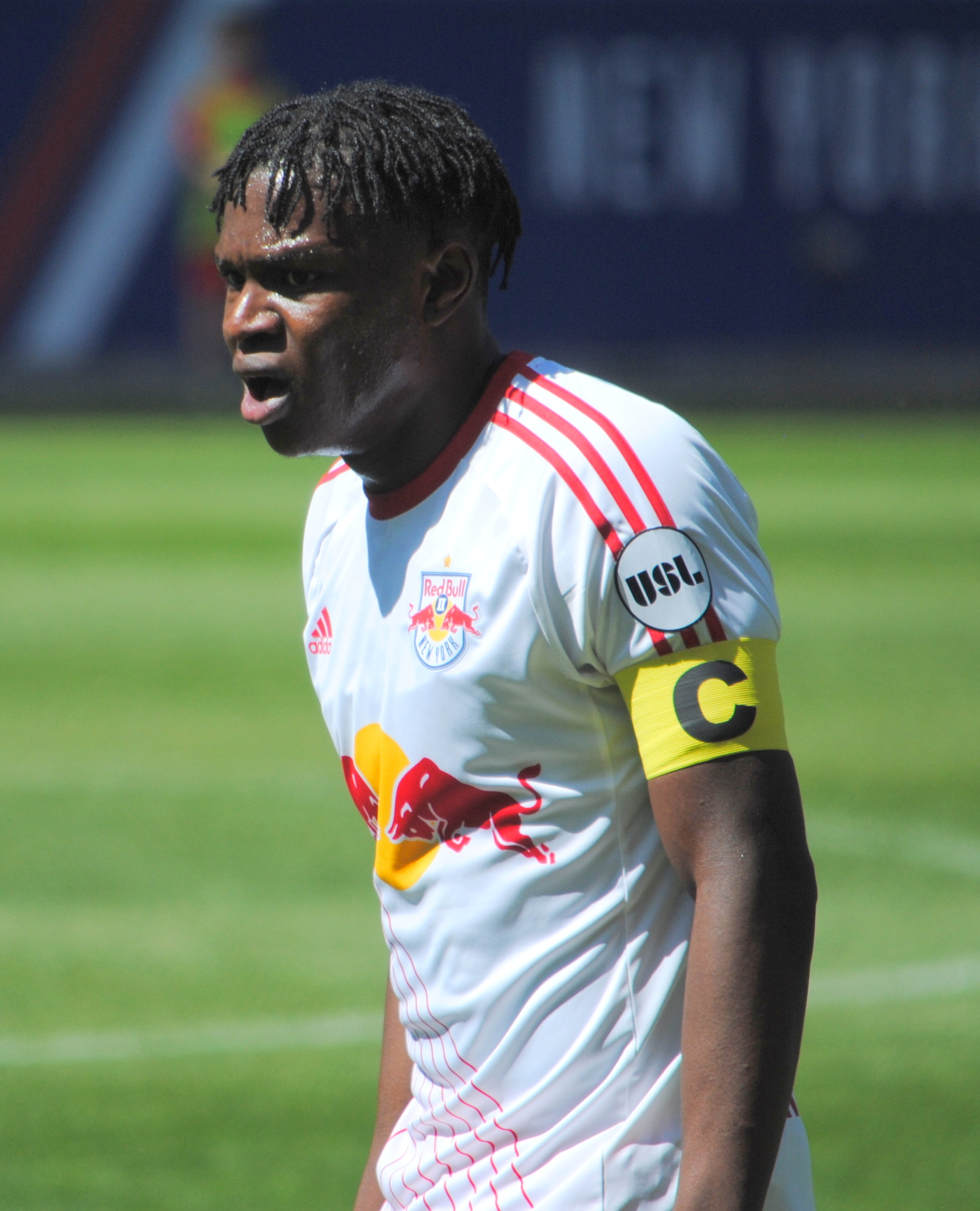

Personal information
- Date of birth: 8 July 1995 (age 31)
- Place of birth: Jamaica
- Height: 6 ft 0 in (1.83 m)
- Position: Defender

Team information
- Current team: Hartford Athletic
- Number: 4

College career
Years	Team	Apps	(Gls)
2013–2016	Iona Gaels	54	(1)

Senior career*
Years	Team	Apps	(Gls)
2016	Lehigh Valley United	10	(0)
2017–2019	New York Red Bulls II	62	(1)
2020–2022	Tampa Bay Rowdies	69	(4)
2023	Louisville City	3	(0)
2024–	Hartford Athletic	78	(5)
- * Club domestic league appearances and goals as of November 4, 2026

Jordan Scarlett (born 8 July 1995) is a Jamaican professional footballer who currently plays in the USL Championship for Hartford Athletic.

== Early life ==
Scarlett was born in Jamaica, but grew up in The Bronx in New York City.

== Career ==
=== College and amateur ===
From 2010 to 2012, Scarlett starred for Christopher Columbus High School in the Bronx, playing as a central midfielder and scoring 19 goals in 34 appearances from Sophomore year to Senior year. Scarlett also played college soccer at Iona College between 2013 and 2016, and in the USL Premier Development League with Reading United AC in 2015, and Lehigh Valley United in 2016.

=== Professional ===
On 17 January 2017, Scarlett was drafted in the third round (61st overall) of the 2017 MLS SuperDraft by New York Red Bulls. He signed with New York Red Bulls II on 22 March 2017. After beginning the 2017 season injured, Scarlett earned a starting position for Red Bull II and made 19 appearances during the season.

In 2018 Scarlett appeared in 20 matches, once again missing significant time due to injury, helping the club reach the USL Playoffs. On 4 February 2019, he signed a new contract with the club.

Scarlett signed with the Tampa Bay Rowdies on 19 December 2019. He was released by Tampa following their 2022 season.

On 1 March 2023, Scarlett signed with USL Championship side Louisville City for their 2023 season. Scarlett's 2023 season was cut short by a knee injury.

Scarlett signed with Hartford Athletic on 8 January 2024.

== Career statistics ==
As of 28 October 2018

Club	Season	League		League Cup		Domestic Cup		Continental		Total	
Club	Season	Apps	Goals	Apps	Goals	Apps	Goals	Apps	Goals	Apps	Goals
New York Red Bulls II	2017	16	0	3	0	0	0	0	0	19	0
New York Red Bulls II	2018	18	0	2	0	0	0	0	0	20	0
New York Red Bulls II	2019	28	0	1	0	0	0	0	0	29	0
Career total		62	0	6	0	0	0	0	0	68	0
