= Logan Gdula =

American soccer player (born 1996)

Personal information
- Date of birth: October 13, 1996 (age 30)
- Place of birth: Colchester, Connecticut, United States
- Height: 5 ft 11 in (1.80 m)
- Position: Full back

College career
Years	Team	Apps	(Gls)
2015–2018	Wake Forest Demon Deacons	77	(2)

Senior career*
Years	Team	Apps	(Gls)
2017–2018	North Carolina Fusion U23	8	(0)
2019	FC Cincinnati	0	(0)
2019	→ Phoenix Rising (loan)	0	(0)
2019	→ Hartford Athletic (loan)	15	(1)
2020–2021	Charleston Battery	36	(2)
2022	Hartford Athletic	20	(0)
- * Club domestic league appearances and goals as of October 16, 2022

Logan Gdula (born October 13, 1996) is an American professional soccer player who plays as a defender.

== Career ==
=== College and amateur ===
Gdula spent four years playing college soccer at Wake Forest University between 2015 and 2018, scoring 2 goals and tallying 14 assists in 77 appearances.

While at college, Gdula also appeared for USL PDL side North Carolina Fusion U23 in 2017 and 2018.

=== Professional ===
On January 11, 2019, Gdula was selected 13th overall in the 2019 MLS SuperDraft by FC Cincinnati.

On February 16, 2019, Gdula was loaned to USL Championship side Phoenix Rising.

On May 18, 2019, Gdula was recalled from his loan at Phoenix without having made a first team appearance. He was subsequently loaned to USL Championship side Hartford Athletic. He scored his first professional goal on June 22, 2019, in a 2–2 draw with Birmingham Legion. Gdula was waived by Cincinnati on January 29, 2020.

On February 12, 2020, he joined Charleston Battery.

On May 10, 2022, Gdula signed with USL Championship side Hartford Athletic.
