= 2020 Atlanta United 2 season =

Atlanta United 2
2020 season
- Owner: Arthur Blank
- President: Darren Eales
- Head coach: Stephen Glass (until July 27, 2020); Tony Annan (July 27, 2020 - December 16, 2020); Stephen Glass (from December 16, 2020)
- Stadium: Fifth Third Bank Stadium
- USL Championship: Group H: 4th Eastern Conf.: 15th
- USL Playoffs: Did not qualify
- Top goalscorer: Jackson Conway & Amadou Macky Diop (6)
- Highest home attendance: League/All: 851
- Lowest home attendance: League/All:
- Average home league attendance: 851
- Biggest win: 5–3 (Sept. 23 vs. NYRB2)
- Biggest defeat: 0–3 (July 24 at Charleston)

The 2020 Atlanta United 2 season was the team's third year of existence, their third season in the USL which is now rebranded as the USL Championship, the second tier of the American soccer pyramid.

== Players ==
As of September 24, 2020.
The squad of Atlanta United 2 will be composed of an unrestricted number of first-team players on loan to the reserve team, players signed to ATLUTD2, and Atlanta United Academy players. Academy players who appear in matches with ATLUTD2 will retain their college eligibility.

Contracted players
No.	Position	Nation	Player
1	GK	USA	Ben Lundgaard
2	DF	ENG	Jack Gurr
3	DF	GAM	Modou Jadama
4	DF	FRA	Bradley Kamdem
5	MF	SEN	Abdoulaye Diop
7	FW	SEN	Amadou Macky Diop
8	MF	SCO	Daniel Steedman
9	FW	USA	Phillip Goodrum
10	MF	USA	Amir Bashti
11	FW	GAM	Lamin Jawneh
14	MF	GAM	Baboucarr Njie
23	GK	USA	Gabriel Rosario
31	DF	DEN	Patrick Nielsen
36	FW	USA	Jackson Conway
—	FW	PAR	Erik López

First team players who have been loaned to ATLUTD2
No.	Position	Nation	Player
13	FW	USA	JJ Williams
21	DF	USA	George Bello
24	FW	USA	Tyler Wolff

Academy call-ups
No.	Position	Nat.	Player
16	MF	USA	Will Reilly
26	FW	USA	Coleman Gannon
27	GK	CHI	Vicente Reyes
28	DF	USA	Garrison Tubbs
29	MF	TTO	Ajani Fortune
30	DF	USA	Caleb Wiley
33	MF	USA	Matthew Edwards
34	MF	USA	David Mejia
35	DF	USA	Efrain Morales
37	MF	USA	Owen Wolff
38	DF	USA	Nigel Prince
39	MF	USA	Brendan Lambe

== Player movement ==
=== In ===
No.	Pos.	Age	Player	Transferred From	Type	Notes	Date	Source
7	FW	31	(Senegal) Amadou Macky Diop	(United States) Radford University	Transfer		November 19, 2019	
2	DF	30	(England) Jack Gurr	(United States) Georgia Revolution	Transfer		December 5, 2019	
8	FW	26	(Scotland) Daniel Steedman	(United States) University of Virginia	Transfer		January 8, 2020	
9	FW	29	(United States) Phillip Goodrum	(United States) UNC Wilimgton	Transfer	Draft Pick	January 13, 2020	
14	MF	31	(The Gambia) Baboucarr Njie	(United States) NCWC	Transfer		January 14, 2020	
3	DF	32	(The Gambia) Modou Jadama	(United States) Portland Timbers	Transfer		January 22, 2020	
11	FW	31	(The Gambia) Lamin Jawneh	Unattatched	Transfer		January 23, 2020	
4	DF	32	(France) Bradley Kamdem	(United States) Saint Louis FC	Transfer		January 24, 2020	
1	GK	31	(United States) Ben Lundgaard	(United States) Columbus Crew	Transfer		January 27, 2020	
23	GK	27	(United States) Gabriel Rosario	(England) Huddersfield Town	Transfer		February 7, 2020	
5	MF	27	(Senegal) Abdoulaye Diop	(United States) Eastern Florida State College	Transfer		February 7, 2020	
31	DF	30	(Denmark) Patrick Nielsen	(United States) Michigan State University	Transfer	Draft Pick	June 29, 2020	
—	FW	24	(Paraguay) Erik López	(Paraguay) Olimpia	Loan		July 18, 2020	

=== Out ===
No.	Pos.	Age	Player	Transferred To	Type	Notes	Date	Source
1	GK	30	(United States) Paul Christensen	(United States) Greenville Triumph	Contract Expired		October 21, 2019	
2	DF	38	(United States) Tyler Ruthven	N/A	Retired		October 21, 2019	
3	DF	27	(Panama) Guillermo Benítez	(Panama) Plaza Amador	Loan return		October 21, 2019	
4	MF	34	(England) Jack Metcalf	(United States) San Diego Loyal	Contract Expired		October 21, 2019	
5	DF	27	(Honduras) Wesly Decas	(Costa Rica) FC Moravia	Loan return		October 21, 2019	
8	MF	30	(United States) Kevin Barajas	Free agent	Contract Expired		October 21, 2019	
11	MF	27	(Ivory Coast) Laurent Kissiedou	Free agent	Contract Expired		October 21, 2019	
16	MF	26	(Honduras) Alessandro Castro	(Honduras) Juticalpa	Contract Expired		October 21, 2019	
24	GK	31	(United States) Dylan Castanheira	(United States) Fort Lauderdale CF	Contract Expired		October 21, 2019	
29	MF	26	(Burundi) Bienvenue Kanakimana	(Czech Republic) MFK Vyškov	Loan return		October 21, 2019	
6	MF	30	(England) Laurence Wyke	(United States) Atlanta United FC	Transfer		March 5, 2020	

=== Academy Leaves ===
No.	Pos.	Age	Player	College/Club	Date
28	DF	24	(United States) Garrison Tubbs	Wake Forest	August 1, 2020
40	DF	24	(United States) Brandon Clagette	Pittsburgh	August 1, 2020
41	DF	24	(United States) Jordan Matthews	South Carolina	August 1, 2020

== Competitions ==
=== Exhibitions ===
February 16, 2020 Preseason 1	Atlanta United 2	0–4	Chattanooga Red Wolves SC	Marietta, Georgia
1:00 PM EDT		Report	Pineda, Zacarías; Zayed	Stadium: Atlanta United Training Facility
Note: Three thirty-minute periods

=== USL Championship ===
==== Standings — Group H ====
Pos	Team	Pld	W	D	L	GF	GA	GD	Pts	PPG	Qualification
1	Tampa Bay Rowdies	16	10	3	3	25	11	+14	33	2.06	Advance to USL Championship Playoffs
2	Charleston Battery	15	9	3	3	26	15	+11	30	2.00	Advance to USL Championship Playoffs
3	Miami FC	16	4	4	8	20	34	−14	16	1.00	
4	Atlanta United 2	16	3	3	10	23	33	−10	12	0.75	

Source: USL

==== Results summary ====
Overall								Home						Away					
Pld	W	D	L	GF	GA	GD	Pts	W	D	L	GF	GA	GD	W	D	L	GF	GA	GD
16	3	3	10	23	33	−10	12	2	2	4	14	16	−2	1	1	6	9	17	−8

Last updated: October 5, 2020.
Source: USL

==== Results by matchday ====
Matchday	1	2	3	4	5	6	7	8	9	10	11	12	13	14	15	16
Stadium	H	A	H	A	H	H	A	H	A	A	A	A	H	H	H	A
Result	L	L	D	L	W	D	L	L	L	D	L	W	L	L	W	L
Position	3	3	3	3	3	3	3	3	3	3	3	3	3	3	3	4

Updated to match(es) played on October 5, 2020. Source: USL
A = Away; H = Home; W = Win; D = Draw; L = Loss

==== Matches ====
Win Draw Loss Upcoming

March 8, 2020 USLC 1	Atlanta United 2	0–1	Charleston Battery	Kennesaw, Georgia
3:30 PM EST	Bashti (yellow card) 57'	Report	Kelly-Rosales (yellow card) 21'; Gdula (yellow card) 40'; Lewis 63' (pen.)	Stadium: Fifth Third Bank Stadium; Attendance: 851; Referee: Elvis Osmanovic

July 11, 2020 USLC 2	Tampa Bay Rowdies	2–1	Atlanta United 2	St. Petersburg, Florida
7:30 PM EDT	Doherty (yellow card) 52'; Mkosana 61'; Fernandes 87', (yellow card) 90'	Report	Bashti (red card) 7'; Conway 11'; Reilly (yellow card) 90+7'	Stadium: Al Lang Stadium; Referee: Elvis Osmanovic

July 18, 2020 USLC 3	Atlanta United 2	2–2	Memphis 901	Kennesaw, Georgia
7:30 PM EDT	Conway 21'; Gannon 57'; Diop (yellow card) 67'; Gurr (yellow card) 78'; Jawneh (yellow card) 90+7'	Report	Doyle (yellow card) 16'; Allen 44'; Hodge (yellow card) 74'; Segbers (yellow card) 90'; Jennings 90+2'	Stadium: Fifth Third Bank Stadium; Referee: Sergii Demianchuk

July 24, 2020 USLC 4	Charleston Battery	3–0	Atlanta United 2	Mount Pleasant, South Carolina
8:00 PM EDT	Nembhard (yellow card) 10'; Daley 20'; Rittmeyer 49'; Crawford (yellow card) 55'; Bosua 90+9'	Report	A. Diop (red card) 81'	Stadium: Patriots Point Soccer Complex; Referee: Izlen Peksenar

July 29, 2020 USLC 5	Atlanta United 2	4–3	Miami FC	Kennesaw, Georgia
7:30 PM EDT	Conway (yellow card) 15' (yellow-red card) 69' (goal) 69'; Macky Diop 41', 48'; Jadama (yellow card) 57'; Reilly (yellow card) 64'; Bashti (yellow card) 81'; Mejia 87', (yellow card) 90+5'	Report	Thiaw 13'; Velásquez 47'; González (yellow card) 68'; Griffiths (yellow card) 83'; Bah (yellow card) 90+3'; Williams 90+7'	Stadium: Fifth Third Bank Stadium; Attendance: 0 Referee: Izlen Peksenar

August 5, 2020 USLC 6	Atlanta United 2	1–1	Charleston Battery	Kennesaw, Georgia
7:30 PM EDT	Jadama (yellow card) 27'; Gannon (yellow card) 36'; Macky Diop 67'; Goodrum (yellow card) 73'	Report	Paterson (yellow card) 38'; Archer (yellow card) 45'; Kelly-Rosales (yellow card) 86'; Cichero 90+4'	Stadium: Fifth Third Bank Stadium; Referee: Chris Ruska

August 8, 2020 USLC 7	Birmingham Legion	1–0	Atlanta United 2	Birmingham, Alabama
7:30 PM EDT	Crognale (yellow card) 27'; Kasim 45+1'	Report	Jadama (yellow card) 36'	Stadium: BBVA Field; Referee: Muhammad Hassan

August 12, 2020 USLC 8	Atlanta United 2	0–2	Tampa Bay Rowdies	Kennesaw, Georgia
	Goodrum (yellow card) 22'; Macky Diop (yellow card) 90+6'	Report	Lasso 34'; Tejada 81'	Stadium: Fifth Third Bank Stadium; Referee: Kyle Johnston

August 15, 2020 USLC 9	Charleston Battery	3–2	Atlanta United 2	Mount Pleasant, South Carolina
8:00 PM EDT	van Schaik (yellow card) 25'; Cichero 57'; Lewis 59', 90+1'; Archer (yellow card) 90+4'	Report	Macky Diop 6'; Reilly (yellow card) 32'; Morales 51'; Gurr (yellow card) 62'	Stadium: Patriots Point Soccer Complex; Referee: John Matto

August 19, 2020 USLC 10	Miami FC	2–2	Atlanta United 2	Miami, Florida
7:00 PM	Ndam (yellow card) 22'; Williams 24', 45+1'; Saydee (yellow card) 27'	Report	Gurr 18'; Macky Diop 23' (pen.), (yellow card) 75'; Jadama (yellow card) 60'	Stadium: Riccardo Silva Stadium; Referee: Natalie Simon

August 22, 2020 USLC 11	Tampa Bay Rowdies	2–1	Atlanta United 2	St. Petersburg, Florida
7:30 PM	Doherty 21'; Murphy 39'; Ekra (yellow card) 45+2'	Report	Macky Diop (yellow card) 37'; Njie (yellow card) 45+1'; Goodrum 90' (pen.)	Stadium: Al Lang Stadium; Referee: Gabriele Giusti

September 2, 2020 USLC 12	Philadelphia Union II	1–2	Atlanta United 2	Chester, Pennsylvania
7:30 PM	Rabadán (yellow card) 39'; Jasinski (yellow card) 47'; Craig (yellow card) 67'; Aaronson 90+6'	Report	Macky Diop 45'; Goodrum (yellow card) 53'; Mejia 90+2'	Stadium: Subaru Park; Referee: Thomas Snyder

September 12, 2020 USLC 13	Atlanta United 2	1–2	Miami FC	Kennesaw, Georgia
	Macky Diop (yellow card) 21'; Fortune 23'; Conway (yellow card) 90+4'	Report	Williams 20', (yellow card) 68'; González 49'; Pais (yellow card) 73'; Markey (yellow card) 88'	Stadium: Fifth Third Bank Stadium; Referee: Muhammad Hassan

September 16, 2020 USLC 14	Atlanta United 2	1–2	Tampa Bay Rowdies	Kennesaw, Georgia
7:30 PM EDT	Scarlett 55' (o.g.); Goodrum (yellow card) 61'; Fortune (yellow card) 67'	Report	Lasso 29'; Fernandes (yellow card) 81'; Murphy (yellow card) 82'; Guenzatti 90+5'	Stadium: Fifth Third Bank Stadium; Referee: Sergii Demianchuk

September 23, 2020 USLC 15	Atlanta United 2	5–3	New York Red Bulls II	Kennesaw, Georgia
	Conway 17', 45+2'; Bashti 20'; Goodrum 29'; Reilly (yellow card) 40'; Morales (yellow card) 43'; Gannon (yellow card) 69'; Mejia 71', (yellow card) 90'	Report	Toure 21'; LaCava 28'; Bounthong 83'; Clark (yellow card) 85'; Kilwien (yellow card) 90'	Stadium: Fifth Third Bank Stadium; Referee: Joshua Belk

October 4, 2020 USLC 16	Miami FC	3–1	Atlanta United 2	Miami, Florida
7:30 PM EDT	Bezecourt (yellow card) 22'; Williams 31' (pen.); Saydee 50'; Granitto (yellow card) 74'; Velásquez (yellow card) 90', (goal) 90+4'; González (yellow card) 90+1'	Report	Edwards (yellow card) 11'; Conway 13'; Reilly (yellow card) 65'; Bashti (yellow card) 70'; Lambe (yellow card) 90+3'	Stadium: Riccardo Silva Stadium; Referee: Alex Billeter

== Statistics ==
=== Top scorers ===
As of October 5, 2020

Place	Position	Name	USLC	Playoffs	Total
1	FW	(United States) Jackson Conway	6	0	6
1	FW	(Senegal) Amadou Macky Diop	6	0	6
3	MF	(United States) David Mejia	3	0	3
4	FW	(United States) Phillip Goodrum	2	0	2
5	MF	(United States) Amir Bashti	1	0	1
5	MF	(Trinidad and Tobago) Ajani Fortune	1	0	1
5	MF	(United States) Coleman Gannon	1	0	1
5	DF	(England) Jack Gurr	1	0	1
5	DF	(United States) Efrain Morales	1	0	1
Own Goals			1	0	1
Total			23	0	23

=== Appearances and goals ===
As of October 5, 2020

Numbers after plus-sign(+) denote appearances as a substitute.

No.	Pos	Nat	Player	Total		Regular season		Playoffs	
No.	Pos	Nat	Player	Apps	Goals	Apps	Goals	Apps	Goals
1	GK	(United States) USA	Ben Lundgaard	13	0	13	0	0	0
2	DF	(England) ENG	Jack Gurr	16	1	16	1	0	0
3	DF	(The Gambia) GAM	Modou Jadama	16	0	16	0	0	0
4	DF	(France) FRA	Bradley Kamdem	1	0	1	0	0	0
5	MF	(Senegal) SEN	Abdoulaye Diop	10	0	7+3	0	0	0
7	FW	(Senegal) SEN	Amadou Macky Diop	12	6	9+3	6	0	0
8	MF	(Scotland) SCO	Daniel Steedman	13	0	2+11	0	0	0
9	FW	(United States) USA	Phillip Goodrum	16	2	14+2	2	0	0
10	MF	(United States) USA	Amir Bashti	15	1	7+8	1	0	0
11	FW	(The Gambia) GAM	Lamin Jawneh	11	0	1+10	0	0	0
14	MF	(The Gambia) GAM	Baboucarr Njie	11	0	7+4	0	0	0
16	MF	(United States) USA	Will Reilly	15	0	15	0	0	0
21	DF	(United States) USA	George Bello	1	0	1	0	0	0
23	GK	(United States) USA	Gabriel Rosario	0	0	0	0	0	0
24	FW	(United States) USA	Tyler Wolff	1	0	1	0	0	0
26	FW	(United States) USA	Coleman Gannon	16	1	13+3	1	0	0
27	GK	(Chile) CHI	Vicente Reyes	3	0	3	0	0	0
29	MF	(Trinidad and Tobago) TTO	Ajani Fortune	11	1	5+6	1	0	0
30	DF	(United States) USA	Caleb Wiley	11	0	11	0	0	0
31	DF	(Denmark) DEN	Patrick Nielsen	10	0	8+2	0	0	0
33	MF	(United States) USA	Matthew Edwards	8	0	6+2	0	0	0
34	MF	(United States) USA	David Mejia	10	3	1+9	3	0	0
35	DF	(United States) USA	Efrain Morales	4	1	2+2	1	0	0
36	FW	(United States) USA	Jackson Conway	10	6	8+2	6	0	0
39	MF	(United States) USA	Brendan Lambe	3	0	1+2	0	0	0
Players who have played for Atlanta United 2 this season but have left the club:
13	FW	(United States) USA	JJ Williams	1	0	1	0	0	0
22	FW	(Brazil) BRA	Luiz Fernando	1	0	1	0	0	0
28	DF	(United States) USA	Garrison Tubbs	6	0	6	0	0	0
