= 2020 Miami FC season =

Miami FC
2020 season
- Owner: Riccardo Silva
- President: Paul Dalglish
- Head coach: Nelson Vargas (until Aug. 10); Paul Dalglish (since Aug. 10)
- Stadium: Riccardo Silva Stadium; Miami, Florida
- USL Championship: Group H: 3rd Eastern Conf.: 13th
- Playoffs: Did not qualify
- U.S. Open Cup: Cancelled
- Top goalscorer: Romario Williams: 8
- Biggest win: MIA 3–1 ATL (Oct. 4)
- Biggest defeat: MIA 0–4 BHM (Sept. 16)
Home colours	Away colours

The 2020 Miami FC season was the club's first season following the sale of the franchise rights of the Ottawa Fury FC to ownership in Miami, Florida. The side participated in the USL Championship, the second-tier of American soccer.

== Roster ==
As of October 4, 2020

Appearances and goals are career totals from all-competitions and leagues.

No.	Name	Nationality	Position	Date of birth (age)	Signed from	Signed in	Contract ends	Apps.	Goals
Goalkeepers
1	Mark Pais	(United States)	GK	June 3, 1991 (age 35)	Fresno FC	2019		31	0
22	Bryant Gammiero	(United States)	GK	November 2, 1993 (age 33)	Florida Soccer Soldiers	2019		6	0
92	Brian Sylvestre	(United States)	GK	December 19, 1992 (age 33)	Forward Madison FC	2020		2	0
Defenders
3	Marco Franco	(United States)	DF	October 6, 1991 (age 35)	Penn FC	2019		29	0
4	Hassan Ndam	(Cameroon)	DF	October 29, 1998 (age 28)	loan from FC Cincinnati	2020	2020	14	0
13	Lawrence Olum	(Kenya)	DF	July 10, 1984 (age 42)	Minnesota United FC	2020		1	0
19	János Löbe	(Germany)	DF	August 21, 1995 (age 31)	New York Red Bulls II	2020		15	0
23	Brenton Griffiths	(Jamaica)	DF	February 9, 1991 (age 35)	Reno 1868	2019		33	3
45	Jalen Markey	(United States)	DF	March 30, 1995 (age 31)	Seattle Sounders FC 2	2019		28	0
Midfielders
6	Harrison Heath	(England)	MF	March 6, 1996 (age 30)	Minnesota United FC	2019		29	1
7	Vincent Bezecourt	(France)	MF	June 10, 1993 (age 33)	New York Red Bulls	2020		15	1
8	Tomás Granitto	(El Salvador)	MF	June 12, 1993 (age 33)	Miami United FC	2019		38	2
10	Sebastián Velásquez	(Colombia)	MF	February 11, 1991 (age 35)	El Paso Locomotive FC	2020		10	4
11	Prince Saydee	(Liberia)	MF	February 20, 1996 (age 30)	Atlanta SC	2020		11	1
17	Brian James	(United States)	MF	October 25, 1993 (age 33)	(Canada) Toronto FC II	2018		38	2
21	Héctor Morales	(Cuba)	MF	January 19, 1993 (age 33)	AFC Ann Arbor	2019		24	2
25	Lance Rozeboom	(United States)	MF	May 31, 1989 (age 37)	Tampa Bay Rowdies	2019		37	0
Forwards
2	Othello Bah	(Liberia)	FW	April 27, 1997 (age 29)	Unattached	2019		29	1
9	Romario Williams	(Jamaica)	FW	August 15, 1994 (age 32)	Columbus Crew SC	2020		16	8
12	Miguel González	(Mexico)	FW	October 1, 1990 (age 36)	Oklahoma City Energy	2019		39	25
14	Lloyd Sam	(Ghana)	FW	September 27, 1984 (age 42)	(England) AFC Wimbledon	2019		32	3
28	Mohamed Thiaw	(Senegal)	FW	January 24, 1995 (age 31)	San Jose Earthquakes	2019		38	17

=== Staff ===
- (Scotland) Paul Dalglish – Interim head coach
- (England) Paul Crichton – Assistant coach
- (United States) Anthony Hazelwood – Assistant coach
- (England) Chris Spendlove – Assistant coach

== Transfers ==
=== In ===
#	Pos.	Player	Signed from	Details	Date	Source
9	FW	(Jamaica) Romario Williams	(United States) Columbus Crew SC	Free transfer	January 1, 2020	
1	GK	(United States) Mark Pais	(United States) Miami FC	Re-signed	January 7, 2020	
45	DF	(United States) Jalen Markey	(United States) Miami FC	Re-signed	January 7, 2020	
16	MF	(England) Harrison Heath	(United States) Miami FC	Re-signed	January 7, 2020	
11	FW	(Ghana) Lloyd Sam	(United States) Miami FC	Re-signed	January 7, 2020	
22	GK	(United States) Bryant Gammiero	(United States) Miami FC	Re-signed	January 8, 2020	
21	MF	(Cuba) Héctor Morales	(United States) Miami FC	Re-signed	January 8, 2020	
28	FW	(Senegal) Mohamed Thiaw	(United States) Miami FC	Re-signed	January 8, 2020	
2	FW	(Liberia) Othello Bah	(United States) Miami FC	Re-signed	January 8, 2020	
3	DF	(United States) Marco Franco	(United States) Miami FC	Re-signed	January 9, 2020	
23	DF	(Jamaica) Brenton Griffiths	(United States) Miami FC	Re-signed	January 9, 2020	
17	MF	(United States) Brian James	(United States) Miami FC	Re-signed	January 9, 2020	
8	MF	(El Salvador) Tomás Granitto	(United States) Miami FC	Re-signed	January 9, 2020	
12	FW	(Mexico) Miguel González	(United States) Miami FC	Re-signed	January 9, 2020	
11	MF	(Liberia) Prince Saydee	(United States) Atlanta SC	Free transfer	January 10, 2020	
13	DF	(Kenya) Lawrence Olum	(United States) Minnesota United FC	Free transfer	January 16, 2020	
7	MF	(France) Vincent Bezecourt	(United States) New York Red Bulls	Free transfer	January 21, 2020	
25	MF	(United States) Lance Rozeboom	(United States) Miami FC	Re-signed	January 22, 2020	
92	GK	(United States) Brian Sylvestre	(United States) Forward Madison FC	Undisclosed fee	January 23, 2020	
19	DF	(Germany) János Löbe	(United States) New York Red Bulls II	Free transfer	January 28, 2020	
4	DF	(Cameroon) Hassan Ndam	(United States) FC Cincinnati	Loan for 2020 season	February 1, 2020	
10	MF	(Colombia) Sebastián Velásquez	(United States) El Paso Locomotive FC	Free transfer	February 5, 2020	

=== Out ===
#	Pos.	Player	Signed to	Details	Date	Source
33	GK	(United States Virgin Islands) Lionel Brown	Unattached	Not re-signed	December 1, 2019	
88	DF	(United States) Shawn Chin	Unattached	Not re-signed	December 1, 2019	
14	MF	(United States) Robert Baggio Kcira	Unattached	Not re-signed	December 1, 2019	
20	MF	(Peru) Alessandro Milesi	Unattached	Not re-signed	December 1, 2019	
10	MF	(Cuba) Ariel Martínez	(United States) FC Tulsa	Free transfer	December 17, 2019	
92	FW	(Cuba) Darío Suárez	(United States) FC Tulsa	Free transfer	December 17, 2019	
5	DF	(England) Callum Chapman-Page	(United States) FC Tulsa	Free transfer	December 18, 2019	
7	DF	(Chile) Maximiliano Schenfeld	(United States) FC Tulsa	Free transfer	December 18, 2019	
4	DF	(Brazil) Matheus Silva	(United States) Hartford Athletic	Free transfer	January 13, 2020	
6	MF	(United States) Dylan Mares	(United States) El Paso Locomotive FC	Free transfer	March 2, 2020	

== Friendlies ==
February 8, 2020 Preseason	Minnesota United FC	5–0	Miami FC	Melbourne, Florida
12:30 p.m.	Amarilla 11'; Greguš 24'; Booth; Toye 84',	Report		Stadium: Titan Soccer Complex

February 13, 2020 Preseason	Miami FC	0–0	New York City FC	Boca Raton, Florida
12:00 p.m.		Report		Stadium: Florida Atlantic University

February 22, 2020 Preseason	Miami FC	2–0	Orlando City B	Miami, Florida
1:00 p.m.	Williams 24'; Franco 79'	Report		Stadium: Riccardo Silva Stadium

== Competitive ==
=== USL Championship ===
==== Standings — Group H ====
Pos	Team	Pld	W	D	L	GF	GA	GD	Pts	PPG	Qualification
1	Tampa Bay Rowdies	16	10	3	3	25	11	+14	33	2.06	Advance to USL Championship Playoffs
2	Charleston Battery	15	9	3	3	26	15	+11	30	2.00	Advance to USL Championship Playoffs
3	Miami FC	16	4	4	8	20	34	−14	16	1.00	
4	Atlanta United 2	16	3	3	10	23	33	−10	12	0.75	

Source: USL

==== Results summary ====
Overall								Home						Away					
Pld	W	D	L	GF	GA	GD	Pts	W	D	L	GF	GA	GD	W	D	L	GF	GA	GD
16	4	4	8	20	34	−14	16	3	2	3	12	16	−4	1	2	5	8	18	−10

Last updated: October 4, 2020.
Source: Match reports

==== Match results ====
In the preparations for the resumption of league play following the shutdown prompted by the COVID-19 pandemic, Miami's schedule was announced on July 2.

March 7 1	Saint Louis FC	4–1	Miami FC	Fenton, Missouri
2:00 PM	Greig 10'; Cicerone 21', 90+2'; Fink (yellow card) 59'; Kavita (yellow card) 71'; Blackwood 77'; Gee (yellow card) 84'	Report	Williams 45' (pen.)	Stadium: Toyota Stadium; Attendance: 4,019; Referee: Jon Freemon

July 29 2	Atlanta United 2	4–3	Miami FC	Kennesaw, Georgia
7:30 PM EDT	Conway (yellow card) 15' (yellow-red card) 69', (goal) 69'; Amadou Diop 41', 48'; Jadama (yellow card) 57'; Reilly (yellow card) 64'; Bashti (yellow card) 81'; Mejia 87', (yellow card) 90+5'	Report	Thiaw 13'; Velásquez 47'; González (yellow card) 68'; Griffiths (yellow card) 83'; Othello (yellow card) 90+3'; Williams 90+7'	Stadium: Fifth Third Bank Stadium; Referee: Izlen Peksenar

August 7 3	Miami FC	0–3	Tampa Bay Rowdies	Miami, Florida
7:00 PM EDT	Rozeboom (yellow card) 36'; Williams (yellow card) 64'; Thiaw (yellow card) 76'	Report	Guenzatti 38'; Johnson 85'; Tejada 90+4'	Stadium: Riccardo Silva Stadium; Referee: Elvis Osmanovic

August 16 4	Tampa Bay Rowdies	1–1	Miami FC	St. Petersburg, Florida
7:30 PM EDT	Guillén (yellow card) 31'; Mkosana 59'	Report	Velásquez 7'; Griffiths (yellow card) 11'; Othello (yellow card) 45+4'; Heath (yellow card) 76'; Thiaw (yellow card) 82'	Stadium: Al Lang Stadium; Attendance: 244; Referee: Tori Penso

August 19 5	Miami FC	2–2	Atlanta United 2	Miami, Florida
7:00 PM EDT	Ndam (yellow card) 22'; Williams 24', 45+1'; Saydee (yellow card) 27'	Report	Gurr 18'; Macky Diop 23' (pen.), (yellow card) 75'; Jadama (yellow card) 60'	Stadium: Riccardo Silva Stadium; Referee: Natalie Simon

August 23 6	Miami FC	2–1	Charlotte Independence	Miami, Florida
7:00 PM EDT	Williams 16'; Granitto 86'; Gammiero (yellow card) 89'	Report	Areman 8'; Roberts (yellow card) 90+1'	Stadium: Riccardo Silva Stadium; Referee: Jonathan Bilinski

August 26 7	Charleston Battery	3–1	Miami FC	Mount Pleasant, South Carolina
7:30 PM EDT	Gdula 29'; Piggott 34', (yellow card) 48'; Marini 63'	Report	Griffiths (yellow card) 44'; Ndam (yellow card) 45+2'; González 53'	Stadium: Patriots Point Soccer Complex; Attendance: 150; Referee: Izlen Peksenar

September 2 8	Tampa Bay Rowdies	3–0	Miami FC	St. Petersburg, Florida
7:30 PM EDT	Steinberger (yellow card) 11'; Scarlett 39'; Guenzatti 64'; Fernandes 83' (pen.)	Report	Sam (yellow card) 37'; Thiaw (yellow card) 42'; Rozeboom (yellow card) 82'	Stadium: Al Lang Stadium; Attendance: 180; Referee: Alyssa Nichols

September 5 9	Miami FC	1–1	Charleston Battery	Miami, Florida
7:00 PM EDT	Markey (yellow card) 26'; Velásquez (yellow card) 42'; Löbe (yellow card) 67'; Granitto (yellow card) 78'; González 86'	Report	Zarokostas 49', (yellow card) 59'; Paterson (yellow card) 58'; Kelly-Rosales (yellow card) 88'; Gdula (yellow card) 89'	Stadium: Riccardo Silva Stadium; Referee: Gabriele Giusti

September 12 10	Atlanta United 2	1–2	Miami FC	Kennesaw, Georgia
7:30 PM EDT	Diop (yellow card) 21'; Ajani 23'; Conway (yellow card) 90+4'	Report	Williams 20', (yellow card) 68'; González 49'; Pais (yellow card) 73'; Griffiths (yellow card) 88'	Stadium: Fifth Third Bank Stadium; Referee: Muhammad Hassan

September 16 11	Miami FC	0–4	Birmingham Legion FC	Miami, Florida
7:30 PM EDT	Rozeboom (yellow card) 52'	Report	Brett 35', 55'; Dean (yellow card) 38'; A. Crognale 42', 45+1'	Stadium: Riccardo Silva Stadium; Referee: Alyssa Nichols

September 20 12	Charleston Battery	2–0	Miami FC	Mount Pleasant, South Carolina
6:00 PM EDT	Lewis 19'; Daley 44'; Zarokostas (yellow card) 76'	Report	Ndam (yellow card) 52'; Heath (yellow card) 85'	Stadium: Patriots Point Soccer Complex; Attendance: 350; Referee: Kyle Johnston

September 23 13	Charlotte Independence	0–0	Miami FC	Matthews, North Carolina
7:00 PM EDT	Miller (yellow card) 33'; Dimick (yellow card) 43'; Vadalá (yellow card) 86'; Martínez (yellow card) 90+5'	Report	James (yellow card) 45'; Heath (yellow card) 51'	Stadium: Sportsplex at Matthews; Referee: Kevin Broadley

September 26 14	Miami FC	0–1	Tampa Bay Rowdies	Miami, Florida
10:00 PM EDT	Williams (yellow card) 75'; Granitto (yellow card) 88'; Ndam (yellow card) 90+1'	Report	Scarlett (yellow card) 16'; Ekra (yellow card) 25'; Guenzatti 37'	Stadium: Riccardo Silva Stadium; Referee: Natalie Simon

September 30 15	Miami FC	4–3	Charleston Battery	Miami, Florida
7:30 PM EDT	Williams (yellow card) 39', (goal) 48'; Bezecourt 60'; Velásquez 65'; González 88'; Heath (yellow card) 90+1'; Pais (yellow card) 90+4'; Saydee (yellow card) 90+6'	Report	Daley 12', 30'; Crawford (yellow card) 26', (goal) 50' van Schaik (yellow card) 60'; Lewis (yellow card) 67'	Stadium: Riccardo Silva Stadium; Referee: Johan Fredrik Roenning

October 4 16	Miami FC	3–1	Atlanta United 2	Miami, Florida
7:30 PM EDT	Bezecourt (yellow card) 22'; Williams 31' (pen.); Saydee 50'; Thiaw (penalty missed) 73'; Granitto (yellow card) 74'; Velásquez (yellow card) 90', (goal) 90+4'; González (yellow card) 90+1'	Report	Edwards (yellow card) 11'; Conway (yellow card) 13'; Reilly (yellow card) 65'; Bashti (yellow card) 70'; Lambe (yellow card) 90+3'	Stadium: Riccardo Silva Stadium; Referee: Alex Billeter

=== U.S. Open Cup ===
As a USL Championship club, Miami FC will enter the competition in the Second Round, to be played April 7–9.

TBD 2nd round	Miami United FC U23 (Florida) or Miami FC (Florida)	P–P	(Florida) Miami FC or (Florida) Naples United FC	Hialeah, Florida or Miami, Florida
TBD PM				Stadium: Ted Hendricks Stadium or Riccardo Silva Stadium
Note: Match postponed due to the COVID-19 pandemic

== Squad statistics ==
As of Match played October 4, 2020

=== Appearances and goals ===
No.	Pos	Nat	Player	Total		Regular Season		U.S. Open Cup	
No.	Pos	Nat	Player	Apps	Goals	Apps	Goals	Apps	Goals
Goalkeepers
1	GK	(United States) USA	Mark Pais	9	0	9+0	0	0	0
22	GK	(United States) USA	Bryant Gammiero	5	0	5+0	0	0	0
92	GK	(United States) USA	Brian Sylvestre	2	0	2+0	0	0	0
Defenders
3	DF	(United States) USA	Marco Franco	14	0	13+1	0	0	0
4	DF	(Cameroon) CMR	Hassan Ndam	14	0	13+1	0	0	0
13	DF	(Kenya) KEN	Lawrence Olum	1	0	1+0	0	0	0
19	DF	(Germany) GER	János Löbe	15	0	7+8	0	0	0
23	DF	(Jamaica) JAM	Brenton Griffiths	12	0	9+3	0	0	0
45	DF	(United States) USA	Jalen Markey	9	0	3+6	0	0	0
Midfielders
6	MF	(England) ENG	Harrison Heath	16	0	14+2	0	0	0
7	MF	(France) FRA	Vincent Bezecourt	15	1	15+0	1	0	0
8	MF	(El Salvador) ESA	Tomás Granitto	16	1	12+4	1	0	0
10	MF	(Colombia) COL	Sebastián Velásquez	10	4	9+1	4	0	0
11	MF	(Liberia) LBR	Prince Saydee	11	1	9+2	1	0	0
17	MF	(United States) USA	Brian James	12	0	6+6	0	0	0
21	MF	(Cuba) CUB	Héctor Morales	5	0	0+5	0	0	0
25	MF	(United States) USA	Lance Rozeboom	14	0	13+1	0	0	0
Forwards
2	FW	(Liberia) LBR	Othello Bah	11	0	10+1	0	0	0
9	FW	(Jamaica) JAM	Romario Williams	16	8	11+5	8	0	0
12	FW	(Mexico) MEX	Miguel González	16	4	6+10	4	0	0
14	FW	(Ghana) GHA	Lloyd Sam	11	0	4+7	0	0	0
28	FW	(Senegal) SEN	Mohamed Thiaw	15	1	5+10	1	0	0

=== Goal scorers ===
Place	Position	Nation	Number	Name	Regular Season	U.S. Open Cup	Total
1	FW	(Jamaica)	9	Romario Williams	8	0	8
2	MF	(Colombia)	10	Sebastián Velásquez	4	0	4
2	FW	(Mexico)	12	Miguel González	4	0	4
4	MF	(France)	7	Vincent Bezecourt	1	0	1
4	MF	(El Salvador)	8	Tomás Granitto	1	0	1
4	MF	(Liberia)	11	Prince Saydee	1	0	1
4	FW	(Senegal)	28	Mohamed Thiaw	1	0	1

=== Disciplinary record ===
Number	Nation	Position	Name	Regular Season		U.S. Open Cup		Total	
Number	Nation	Position	Name	Yellow card	Red card	Yellow card	Red card	Yellow card	Red card
1	(United States)	GK	Mark Pais	2	0	-	-	2	0
2	(Liberia)	FW	Othello Bah	2	0	-	-	2	0
4	(Cameroon)	DF	Hassan Ndam	4	0	-	-	4	0
6	(England)	MF	Harrison Heath	4	0	-	-	4	0
7	(France)	MF	Vincent Bezecourt	1	0	-	-	1	0
8	(El Salvador)	MF	Tomás Granitto	3	0	-	-	3	0
9	(Jamaica)	FW	Romario Williams	4	0	-	-	4	0
10	(Colombia)	MF	Sebastián Velásquez	2	0	-	-	2	0
11	(Liberia)	MF	Prince Saydee	2	0	-	-	2	0
12	(Mexico)	FW	Miguel González	2	0	-	-	2	0
14	(Ghana)	FW	Lloyd Sam	1	0	-	-	1	0
17	(United States)	MF	Brian James	1	0	-	-	1	0
19	(Germany)	DF	János Löbe	1	0	-	-	1	0
22	(United States)	GK	Bryant Gammiero	1	0	-	-	1	0
23	(Jamaica)	DF	Brenton Griffiths	3	0	-	-	3	0
25	(United States)	MF	Lance Rozeboom	3	0	-	-	3	0
28	(Senegal)	FW	Mohamed Thiaw	3	0	-	-	3	0
45	(United States)	DF	Jalen Markey	2	0	-	-	2	0
