= 2019–20 Miami FC season =

Miami FC
2019–20 NISA season
- Owner: Riccardo Silva
- Head coach: Paul Dalglish
- Stadium: Buccaneer Field at Barry University & Riccardo Silva Stadium
- NISA: Fall, East Coast Conf.: 1st Spring: N/A
- Playoffs: Fall: East Coast Champion; Spring: N/A
- Top goalscorer: League: Dylan Mares (5); All: Dylan Mares & Miguel González (5)
- Highest home attendance: League/All: 1,309 (November 9 vs. Stumptown Athletic)
- Lowest home attendance: 289 (October 6 vs. Atlanta SC)
- Average home league attendance: 569 (regular season); 717 (inc. playoffs)
- Biggest win: 8–1 (September 15 vs. Philadelphia Fury)
- Biggest defeat: N/A

The 2019–20 Miami FC season was the club's first season playing in the National Independent Soccer Association, a newly established third division soccer league in the United States, and first professional season since 2017. It was also Miami's third season of professional play overall.

The team competed in the fall portion of the NISA season, between September and November 2019, before leaving the league and joining the second division USL Championship. During that span Miami went undefeated through eight games and won the NISA East Coast Championship over Stumptown Athletic. Dylan Mares and Miguel González led the team with five goals each.

== Overview ==
Following the cancellation of the 2018 NASL season, Miami FC began play in the National Premier Soccer League, a semi-pro league affiliated to the United States Adult Soccer Association (USASA), and won its national title in both 2018 and 2019. In mid-2019, it was announced that the team would re-join professional soccer in the newly established National Independent Soccer Association (NISA). The 2019 fall NISA schedule was announced on July 25, 2019.

On December 11, former USL Championship club Ottawa Fury FC announced that it had transferred its franchise rights to the Miami FC ownership group, and the club would begin competition in the league beginning with the 2020 season. Miami became the second NISA team to cease league play during an on-going season after Philadelphia Fury went on hiatus after one game earlier in 2019.

== Roster ==
As of December 5, 2019

Appearances and goals are career totals from all-competitions and leagues.

No.	Name	Nationality	Position	Date of birth (age)	Signed from	Signed in	Contract ends	Apps.	Goals
Goalkeepers
1	Mark Pais	(United States)	GK	June 3, 1991 (age 35)	Fresno FC	2019		22	0
22	Bryant Gammiero	(United States)	GK	November 2, 1993 (age 32)	Florida Soccer Soldiers	2019		1	0
33	Lionel Brown	(United States Virgin Islands)	GK	September 17, 1987 (age 39)	Fort Lauderdale Strikers	2016		4	0
Defenders
3	Marco Franco	(United States)	DF	October 6, 1991 (age 34)	Penn FC	2019		15	0
4	Matheus Silva	(Brazil)	DF	December 8, 1996 (age 29)	Orlando City B	2019		2	0
5	Callum Chapman-Page	(England)	DF	November 3, 1995 (age 30)	PBA Sailfish	2019		15	2
7	Maximiliano Schenfeld	(Chile)	DF	October 18, 1992 (age 33)	Miami United FC	2019		3	0
23	Brenton Griffiths	(Jamaica)	DF	February 9, 1991 (age 35)	Reno 1868	2019		21	3
45	Jalen Markey	(United States)	DF	March 30, 1995 (age 31)	Seattle Sounders FC 2	2019		19	0
88	Shawn Chin	(United States)	DF	May 11, 1989 (age 37)	Colorado Springs Switchbacks FC	2018		26	3
Midfielders
6	Dylan Mares	(United States)	MF	February 11, 1992 (age 34)	Indy Eleven	2019		77	27
8	Tomás Granitto	(El Salvador)	MF	June 12, 1993 (age 33)	Miami United FC	2019		22	1
14	Robert Baggio Kcira	(United States)	MF	September 1, 1994 (age 32)	(Austria) Wiener Neustadt	2019		17	2
16	Harrison Heath	(England)	MF	March 6, 1996 (age 30)	Minnesota United FC	2019		13	1
17	Brian James	(United States)	MF	October 25, 1993 (age 32)	(Canada) Toronto FC II	2018		26	2
20	Alessandro Milesi	(Peru)	MF	December 21, 1999 (age 26)	(Italy) Brescia Calcio U-19	2019		2	0
21	Héctor Morales	(Cuba)	MF	January 19, 1993 (age 33)	AFC Ann Arbor	2019		19	2
25	Lance Rozeboom	(United States)	MF	May 31, 1989 (age 37)	Tampa Bay Rowdies	2019		23	0
Forwards
2	Othello Bah	(Liberia)	FW	April 27, 1997 (age 29)	Unattached	2019		18	1
9	Mohamed Thiaw	(Senegal)	FW	January 24, 1995 (age 31)	San Jose Earthquakes	2019		23	16
11	Lloyd Sam	(Ghana)	FW	September 27, 1984 (age 41)	(England) AFC Wimbledon	2019		21	3
12	Miguel González	(Mexico)	FW	October 1, 1990 (age 35)	Oklahoma City Energy	2019		23	21

=== Staff ===
- (Scotland) Paul Dalglish – Head coach
- (United States) Nelson Vargas – Assistant coach
- (United States) Anthony Hazelwood – Goalkeeper coach

== Transfers ==
=== In ===
#	Pos.	Player	Signed from	Details	Date	Source
22	GK	(United States) Bryant Martin Gammiero	(United States) Florida Soccer Soldiers	Free transfer	September 5, 2019	
20	MF	(Peru) Alessandro Milesi	(Italy) Brescia Calcio U-19	Free transfer	September 5, 2019	
7	DF	(Chile) Maximiliano Schenfeld	(United States) Miami United FC	Free transfer	September 24, 2019	
4	DF	(Brazil) Matheus Silva	(United States) Orlando City B	Free transfer	October 2, 2019	

==== Notes ====
1. 17 of Miami FC's players were already signed to professional contracts prior to joining NISA

=== Out ===
#	Pos.	Player	Signed to	Details	Date	Source
7	DF	(United States) John Neeskens	(Russia) Trenčín	Free transfer	August 8, 2019	
10	MF	(Cuba) Ariel Martínez	(United States) FC Tulsa	Free transfer	December 17, 2019	
92	FW	(Cuba) Darío Suárez	(United States) FC Tulsa	Free transfer	December 17, 2019	

== Competitions ==
=== NISA Fall season (Showcase) ===
==== Standings ====
Pos	Team	Pld	W	D	L	GF	GA	GD	Pts	Qualification
1	Miami FC (O)	6	4	2	0	19	6	+13	14	East Coast Championship
2	Stumptown Athletic	6	4	0	2	13	7	+6	12	East Coast Championship
3	Atlanta SC	6	2	2	2	13	10	+3	8	
4	Philadelphia Fury	6	0	0	6	1	23	−22	0	Withdrew (Note: Philadelphia Fury withdrew after one match and forfeited their remaining matches)

Source: NISAofficial.com
(O) Play-off winners

==== Results summary ====
Overall								Home						Away					
Pld	W	D	L	GF	GA	GD	Pts	W	D	L	GF	GA	GD	W	D	L	GF	GA	GD
7	5	2	0	22	8	+14	17	3	1	0	15	6	+9	2	1	0	7	2	+5

Last updated: November 9, 2019.
Source: Match reports

==== Matches ====
September 15, 2019 1	Miami FC	8–1	Philadelphia Fury	Miami Shores, Florida
7:00 p.m.	Sam 21'; González 27', 80'; Bah 54'; Mares 58', 62', 68'; Suárez (yellow card) 86'; Philadelphia Fury 90' (o.g.)	Report; MyCujoo Broadcast	Hurff (yellow card) 49'; Bennett (yellow card) 71'; Schneider 77'	Stadium: Buccaneer Field at Barry University; Attendance: 782

September 22, 2019 2	Miami FC	2–1	Stumptown Athletic	Miami Shores, Florida
7:00 p.m	Griffiths 21'; Suárez 70'	Report; MyCujoo Broadcast	Benamna 35', (yellow card) 55'; Binns (yellow card) 75'	Stadium: Buccaneer Field at Barry University; Attendance: 312

September 28, 2019 3	Stumptown Athletic	0–2	Miami FC	Pineville, North Carolina
7:00 p.m.	Binns (yellow card) 38'; Silva (yellow card) 45+2'	Report; MyCujoo Broadcast	Mares 25'; Markey (yellow card) 40' (yellow-red card) 86'; Thiaw 61'	Stadium: CSA OrthoCarolina Sportsplex; Attendance: 502

October 6, 2019 4	Miami FC	2–2	Atlanta SC	Miami Shores, Florida
7:00 p.m.	Thiaw 18', 60'; Chin (yellow card) 38'; Heath (yellow card) 82'	Report; MyCujoo Broadcast	Moreno (yellow card) 10'; Bartman 53'; Gerewou (yellow card) 84'; Frank 90+2', (yellow card) 90+6'	Stadium: Buccaneer Field at Barry University; Attendance: 289

October 12, 2019 5	Atlanta SC	2–2	Miami FC	Alpharetta, Georgia
7:00 p.m.	Karpeh, Jr. 11'; Otoo (yellow card) 52'; Saydee 69'	Report	Mares 13' (pen.), (yellow card) 74'; Thiaw 58'	Stadium: St. Francis School; Attendance: 252

October 26, 2019 6	Miami FC	3–2	Oakland Roots SC	Miami, Florida
7:00 p.m.	González 11', 38'; Rozeboom (yellow card) 57'; Chin 90+3'	Report; MyCujoo Broadcast	Ghantous (yellow card) 24'; McInerney 43', 49'	Stadium: Riccardo Silva Stadium; Attendance: 891
Note: Due to Miami playing more than six games, this game was not counted towards its standings in the East Table but did count for Oakland in the West Table.

November 1, 2019 7	Philadelphia Fury	0–3 (Forfeit)	Miami FC	Philadelphia, Pennsylvania
7:00 p.m.				Stadium: David Stanton Field

==== Playoff ====
November 9, 2019	Miami FC	3–0	Stumptown Athletic	Miami, Florida
7:00 p.m.	Martínez 28' (pen.); González 38'; Sam 45'; Heath (yellow card) 76'	Report; MyCujoo Broadcast	Campbell (yellow card) 90+'	Stadium: Riccardo Silva Stadium; Attendance: 1309

== Squad statistics ==
=== Appearances and goals ===
No.	Pos	Nat	Player	Total		Fall Season		Fall Playoff	
No.	Pos	Nat	Player	Apps	Goals	Apps	Goals	Apps	Goals
Goalkeepers
1	GK	(United States) USA	Mark Pais	6	0	5	0	1	0
22	GK	(United States) USA	Bryant Gammiero	1	0	1	0	0	0
33	GK	(United States Virgin Islands) VIR	Lionel Brown	0	0	0	0	0	0
Defenders
3	DF	(United States) USA	Marco Franco	6	0	5	0	1	0
4	DF	(Brazil) BRA	Matheus Silva	2	0	2	0	0	0
5	DF	(England) ENG	Callum Chapman-Page	2	0	1	0	1	0
7	DF	(Chile) CHI	Maximiliano Schenfeld	3	0	3	0	0	0
23	DF	(Jamaica) JAM	Brenton Griffiths	6	2	5	2	1	0
45	DF	(United States) USA	Jalen Markey	4	0	4	0	0	0
88	DF	(United States) USA	Shawn Chin	6	1	5	1	1	0
Midfielders
6	MF	(United States) USA	Dylan Mares	7	5	6	5	1	0
8	MF	(El Salvador) ESA	Tomás Granitto	6	0	5	0	1	0
10	MF	(Cuba) CUB	Ariel Martínez	7	1	6	0	1	1
14	MF	(United States) USA	Robert Baggio Kcira	0	0	0	0	0	0
16	MF	(England) ENG	Harrison Heath	6	0	5	0	1	0
17	MF	(United States) USA	Brian James	6	0	5	0	1	0
20	MF	(Peru) PER	Alessandro Milesi	2	0	2	0	0	0
21	MF	(Cuba) CUB	Héctor Morales	6	0	5	0	1	0
25	MF	(United States) USA	Lance Rozeboom	6	0	5	0	1	0
Forwards
2	FW	(Liberia) LBR	Othello Bah	4	1	3	1	1	0
9	FW	(Senegal) SEN	Mohamed Thiaw	7	4	6	4	1	0
11	FW	(Ghana) GHA	Lloyd Sam	6	2	5	1	1	1
12	FW	(Mexico) MEX	Miguel González	6	5	5	4	1	1
92	FW	(Cuba) CUB	Darío Suárez	6	1	5	1	1	0

=== Goal scorers ===
Place	Position	Nation	Number	Name	Fall Season	Fall Playoff	Total
1	MF	(United States)	6	Dylan Mares	5	0	5
1	FW	(Mexico)	12	Miguel González	4	1	5
2	FW	(Brazil)	9	Mohamed Thiaw	4	0	4
3	FW	(Ghana)	11	Lloyd Sam	1	1	2
3	DF	(Jamaica)	23	Brenton Griffiths	2	0	2
4	FW	(Liberia)	2	Othello Bah	1	0	1
4	MF	(Cuba)	10	Ariel Martínez	0	1	1
4	FW	(Cuba)	22	Darío Suárez	1	0	1
4	DF	(United States)	88	Shawn Chin	1	0	1
				Own goal	1	0	1

=== Disciplinary record ===
Number	Nation	Position	Name	Fall Season		Fall Playoff		Total	
Number	Nation	Position	Name	Booked	Sent off (straight red)	Booked	Sent off (straight red)	Booked	Sent off (straight red)
6	(United States)	MF	Dylan Mares	1	0	0	0	1	0
16	(Jamaica)	MF	Harrison Heath	1	0	1	0	2	0
25	(United States)	MF	Lance Rozeboom	1	0	0	0	1	0
45	(United States)	DF	Jalen Markey	2	1	0	0	2	1
88	(United States)	DF	Shawn Chin	1	0	0	0	1	0
92	(Cuba)	FW	Darío Suárez	1	0	0	0	1	0
