= 2018 Tampa Bay Rowdies season =

Tampa Bay Rowdies
2018 season
- Chairman: Stuart Sternberg (from October 2); Bill Edwards (until October 2)
- Head coach: Neill Collins (from May 18); Stuart Campbell (until May 17)
- Stadium: Al Lang Stadium
- USL: 12th (Eastern Conference)
- USL Cup: did not qualify
- U.S. Open Cup: Second round
- Top goalscorer: Georgi Hristov (7)
- Highest home attendance: 7,709 (Oct. 7 vs. Charlotte)
- Lowest home attendance: 4,876 (Aug. 11 vs. North Carolina)
- Average home league attendance: 5,869
- Biggest win: 5–0 (Apr. 7 vs Ottawa)
- Biggest defeat: 0–5 (Apr. 14 vs. New York)
Home colors	Away colors	Third colors

The 2018 Tampa Bay Rowdies season was the club's ninth season of existence, and their second in the United Soccer League. Including the previous Tampa Bay Rowdies, it was the 25th season of a franchise in the Tampa Bay metro area with the Rowdies moniker. Including the now-defunct Tampa Bay Mutiny, this was the 31st season of professional soccer in the Tampa Bay region.

== Club ==
On October 2, 2018, the Tampa Bay Rays baseball club announced their purchase the Rowdies for an undisclosed amount, pending St. Petersburg City Council approval. Once the sale was finalized, Rays presidents Matthew Silverman and Brian Auld became vice chairmen of the soccer club. They, along with Rowdies vice president and chief operating officer Lee Cohen, became the team's directors.

=== Roster ===
As of September 14, 2018

No.	Position	Nation	Player
1	GK	USA	Cody Mizell
2	DF	USA	Kyle Curinga
4	DF	SEN	Papé Diakité
5	DF	USA	David Najem
7	MF	JAM	Junior Flemmings
9	MF	USA	Alex Morrell
10	FW	BUL	Georgi Hristov
11	MF	BRA	Leo Fernandes
13	FW	URU	Sebastián Guenzatti
14	FW	USA	Leon Taylor
15	DF	USA	Zac Portillos
16	DF	USA	Max Lachowecki
17	FW	USA	Jaime Chavez
19	GK	ARG	Daniel Vega
20	MF	DEN	Martin Vingaard
23	MF	USA	Michael Nanchoff
24	DF	USA	Tarek Morad
25	MF	USA	Lance Rozeboom
26	MF	ENG	Joe Cole (captain)
27	DF	USA	Hunter Gorskie
28	MF	ALB	Afrim Taku
29	MF	GHA	Dominic Oduro
50	GK	USA	Akira Fitzgerald
56	FW	USA	Stefano Bonomo
88	MF	GHA	Kwadwo Poku
90	DF	CAN	Kyle Porter

=== Technical staff ===
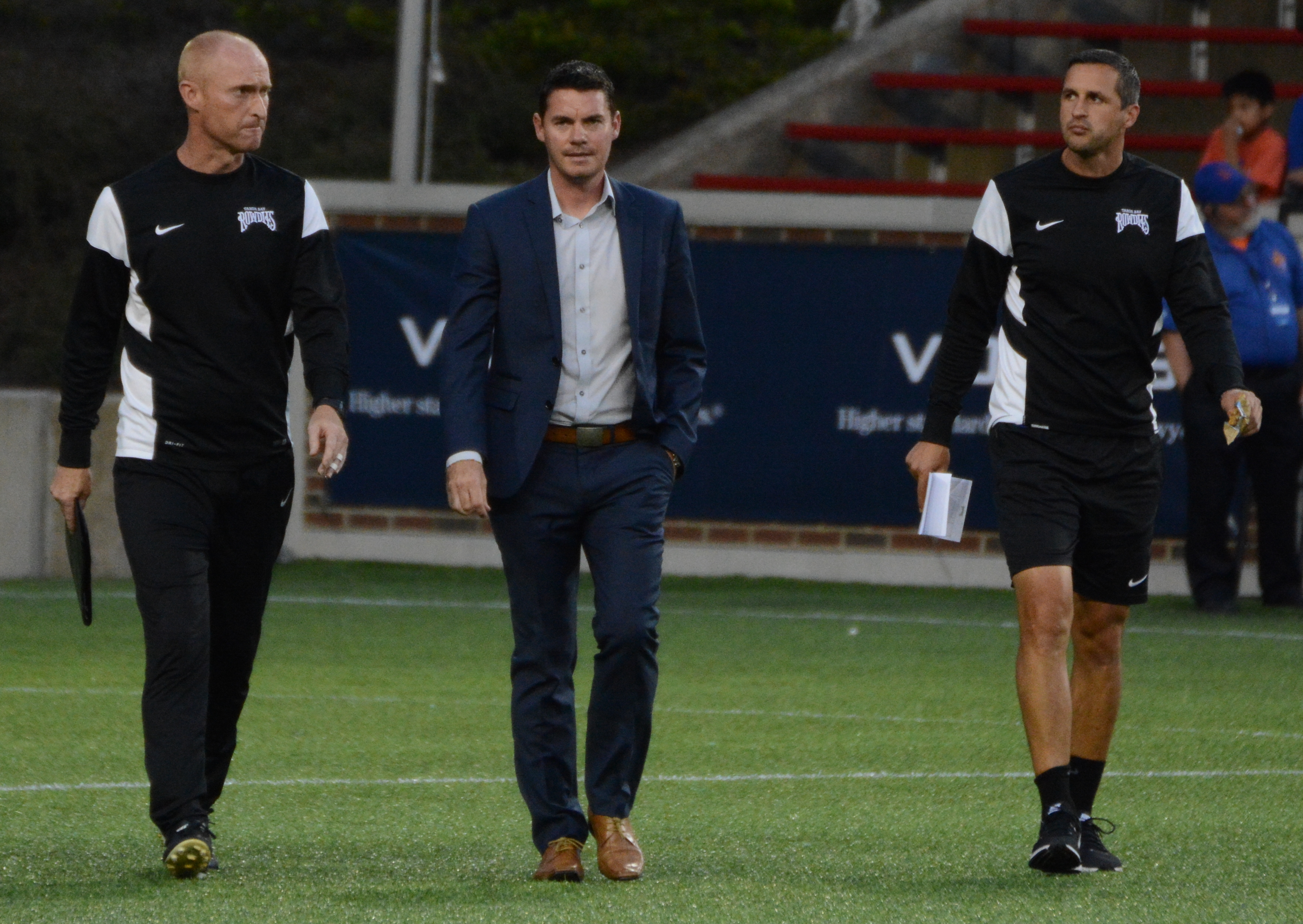
Stuart Dobson, Stuart Campbell, and Raoul Voss

- (Scotland) Neill Collins - head coach (beginning May 18)
- (United States) Cheyne Roberts – assistant coach
- (Northern Ireland) Martin Paterson – assistant coach
- (England) Stuart Dobson – goalkeeper coach
- (United States) Blain Bott – strength and conditioning coach
- (United States) Bentley Smith – kit man
- (Scotland) Stuart Campbell – head coach (until May 17)

=== Medical staff ===
- (United States) Andrew Keane – head athletic trainer
- (United States) Michelle Leget – assistant athletic trainer
- (United States) Robert Dixon – message therapist
- (United States) Dr. Koco Eaton – team physician and orthopedic surgeon
- (United States) Dr. Mohit Bansal – team physician and orthopedic surgeon
- (United States) Dr. Christopher Salud – team physician
- (United States) Dr. Samuel Meyers – team chiropractor

=== Front office ===
- (United States) Stuart Sternberg – owner (beginning October 2)
- (United States) Lee Cohen – vice president and chief operating officer
- (United States) Matthew Silverman – vice chairmen (beginning October 2)
- (United States) Brian Auld – vice chairmen (beginning October 2)
- (United States) Bill Edwards – chairman, chief executive officer and governor (until October 2)

== Competitions ==
=== Preseason / Friendlies ===
The Rowdies hosted Major League Soccer teams in the Suncoast Invitational for the third year in a row.

February 10, 2018	Tampa Bay Rowdies	0–1	FC Cincinnati	Bradenton
15:30 EST (UTC−5)	Gorskie (yellow card) 76'; Morrell (yellow card) 86'; Hristov (yellow card) 87'	Report	Walker (yellow card) 21'; Barrett (yellow card) 41'; Halfhill 63'	Stadium: IMG Academy

February 17, 2018 Suncoast Invitational	Tampa Bay Rowdies	1–2	Montreal Impact	St. Petersburg
19:30 EST (UTC−5)	Hristov (yellow card) 32'; Graf 75' (Guenzatti)	Report	Edwards (yellow card) 32'; Taïder 44' (Petrasso); Petrasso (yellow card) 61'; Piatti 77' (Taïder)	Stadium: Al Lang Stadium; Referee: Sorin Stoica

February 24, 2018 Suncoast Invitational	Tampa Bay Rowdies	2–1	Philadelphia Union	St. Petersburg
19:30 EST (UTC−5)	Graf 19' (Blake); Nanchoff 35' (Najem); Blake (yellow card) 36'	Report	Creavalle (yellow card) 21'; Medunjanin 84'	Stadium: Al Lang Stadium; Referee: Ted Unkel

March 9, 2018	USF Bulls	2–5	Tampa Bay Rowdies	Tampa
19:00 EST (UTC−5)	Jackson 42'; Skublak 66'	Report	Fernandes (yellow card) 11', (goal) 51' (Portillos); Cole 39' (Najem); Nanchoff 50' (Najem); Hristov 61' (Fernandes); Graf 75' (pen.)	Stadium: Corbett Soccer Stadium

July 16, 2018 Closed-door scrimmage	Tampa Bay Rowdies	2–2	Lakeland Tropics	St. Petersburg
EST (UTC−5)	Graf,		Coutinho; Ruiz	Stadium: Al Lang Stadium; Attendance: Closed-door

=== USL ===
==== USL Eastern Conference table ====
Pos	Team	Pld	W	D	L	GF	GA	GD	Pts
10	Ottawa Fury	34	13	6	15	31	43	−12	45
11	Charlotte Independence	34	10	12	12	44	57	−13	42
12	Tampa Bay Rowdies	34	11	8	15	44	44	0	41
13	Penn FC	34	9	10	15	38	47	−9	37
14	Atlanta United 2	34	7	10	17	37	72	−35	31

Source: 2018 USL standings
Rules for classification: 1) total wins; 2) total goal differential; 3) total goals scored; 4) points earned against top four Conference finishers; 5) disciplinary points; 6) coin toss or drawing of lots

==== Results summary ====
Overall								Home						Away					
Pld	W	D	L	GF	GA	GD	Pts	W	D	L	GF	GA	GD	W	D	L	GF	GA	GD
34	11	8	15	44	44	0	41	7	5	5	28	17	+11	4	3	10	16	27	−11

Last updated: 14 October 2018.
Source: Match reports

==== Results by round ====
Round	1	2	3	4	5	6	7	8	9	10	11	12	13	14	15	16	17	18	19	20	21	22	23	24	25	26	27	28	29	30	31	32	33	34
Stadium	A	H	A	H	A	H	A	A	A	H	A	H	H	H	A	H	H	A	H	H	A	H	H	A	H	A	A	H	A	H	A	A	H	A
Result	W	W	L	W	L	W	L	L	L	D	W	D	D	L	D	W	L	L	W	D	L	D	L	D	L	W	L	W	W	W	L	D	L	L
Position	3	2	2	1	3	2	2	7	7	9	7	8	9	11	11	9	11	12	10	12	12	12	12	12	13	13	13	13	11	10	11	11	12	12

Updated to match(es) played on 27 Sept 2018. Source: Match reports
A = Away; H = Home; W = Win; D = Draw; L = Loss

==== Results ====
March 17, 2018 1	North Carolina FC	1–3	Tampa Bay Rowdies	Cary
15:30 EDT (UTC−4)	Danso (yellow card) 17'; Miller 38' (Lomis)	Report	Fernandes 23' (Hristov); Hristov 41' (pen.); Blake 90' (Guenzatti)	Stadium: WakeMed Soccer Park; Attendance: 4,197; Referee: Guido Gonzalez

March 24, 2018 2	Tampa Bay Rowdies	2–0	Bethlehem Steel FC	St. Petersburg
19:30 EDT (UTC−4)	Hristov 62' (Blake); Fernandes 68' (Najem); Najem (yellow card) 90'	Report	Herbers (yellow card) 54'	Stadium: Al Lang Stadium; Attendance: 7,368; Referee: Rubiel Vazquez

March 31, 2018 3	Louisville City FC	1–0	Tampa Bay Rowdies	Louisville
19:30 EDT (UTC−4)	McMahon (yellow card) 26'; Jimenez 69' (DelPiccolo)	Report	Hristov (yellow card) 60'; Collins (yellow card) 70'	Stadium: Louisville Slugger Field; Attendance: 6,336; Referee: Jon Freemon

April 7, 2018 4	Tampa Bay Rowdies	5–0	Ottawa Fury FC	St. Petersburg
19:30 EDT (UTC−4)	Hristov 60' (Schäfer); Mannella 71' (o.g.); Fernandes 79'; Schäfer (yellow card) 81'; Cole 87' (Blake); Portillos 90+5' (Fernandes)	Report	Dixon (yellow card) 11'; Obasi (red card) 90+1'; Mannella (yellow card) 90+3'	Stadium: Al Lang Stadium; Attendance: 5,059; Referee: Luis Guardia

April 14, 2018 5	New York Red Bulls II	5–0	Tampa Bay Rowdies	Harrison
16:00 EDT (UTC−4)	Escobar 18' (Rivas), (yellow card) 25'; Cásseres (yellow card) 28'; Aguinaga 53' (Bonomo); Bonomo 61' (Moreno); White 84' (Bonomo), 90' (Stroud); Lema (yellow card) 85'	Report	Cole (yellow card) 25'; Blake (yellow card) 77'	Stadium: Red Bull Arena; Attendance: 903; Referee: Alan Kelly

April 21, 2018 6	Tampa Bay Rowdies	2–0	Real Monarchs SLC	St. Petersburg
19:30 EDT (UTC−4)	Gorskie (yellow card) 35'; Cole 40', (yellow card) 51'; Hristov 70' (Cole)	Report	Ryden (yellow card) 45'; Portillo (yellow card) 59'	Stadium: Al Lang Stadium; Attendance: 6,027; Referee: Daniel Gutierrez

April 28, 2018 7	Charleston Battery	1–0	Tampa Bay Rowdies	Charleston
19:00 EDT (UTC−4)	Candela (yellow card) 5'; Guerra 45+1' van Schaik (yellow card) 46'	Report	Cole (yellow card) 30'	Stadium: MUSC Health Stadium; Attendance: 3,462; Referee: Ismir Pekmic

May 4, 2018 8	Penn FC	3–0	Tampa Bay Rowdies	Harrisburg
19:00 EDT (UTC−4)	Venter 11' (Ortiz); Heinemann (yellow card) 25', (goal) 57' (Opoku), 60' (Galvão); Metzger (yellow card) 32'; Peiser (yellow card) 89'	Report	Curinga (yellow card) 15'	Stadium: FNB Field; Attendance: 1,281; Referee: Javier Santos Escobar

May 12, 2018 9	Richmond Kickers	1–0	Tampa Bay Rowdies	Richmond
19:00 EDT (UTC−4)	Kelly 38' (Yearwood); Shanosky (yellow card) 90+6'	Report	Hristov (yellow card) 35'; Lachowecki (yellow card) 65'; Rozeboom (yellow card) 90+6'	Stadium: City Stadium; Attendance: 5,860; Referee: Lorant Varga

May 19, 2018 10	Tampa Bay Rowdies	2–2	Pittsburgh Riverhounds	St. Petersburg
19:30 EDT (UTC−4)	Rozeboom 3' (Morrell); Hristov (yellow card) 57'; Cole 59'; Lachowecki (yellow card) 90+1'	Report	Kerr (yellow card) 17'; Lachowecki 20' (o.g.); Parkes 30' (Forbes); Pratzner (yellow card) 49'	Stadium: Al Lang Stadium; Attendance: 6,202; Referee: David Barrie

May 26, 2018 11	Toronto FC II	2–4	Tampa Bay Rowdies	Toronto
14:00 EDT (UTC−4)	Uccello (yellow card) 21'; Bjornethun (yellow card) 26'; Campbell 50' (Petrasso); Johnson 63' (Uccello); Romeo (yellow card) 73'	Report	Nanchoff (yellow card) 18', (goal) 25'; Flemmings 24' (Schäfer), 89'; Cole (yellow card) 40'; Gorskie 74' (Schäfer), (yellow card) 77'	Stadium: BMO Field; Attendance: 141; Referee: Alain Ruch

June 2, 2018 12	Tampa Bay Rowdies	0–0	Atlanta United 2	St. Petersburg
19:30 EDT (UTC−4)	Vingaard (yellow card) 25'; Schäfer (red card) 44'; Cole (yellow card) 90'	Report	Crain (yellow card) 32' (yellow-red card) 40'; Metcalf (yellow card) 43'; Kendall-Moullin (yellow card) 90+2'	Stadium: Al Lang Stadium; Attendance: 5,953; Referee: Jonathan Bilinski

June 9, 2018 13	Tampa Bay Rowdies	1–1	Nashville SC	St. Petersburg
19:30 EDT (UTC−4)	Mkandawire (yellow card) 68'; Taylor 84'; Hristov (yellow card) 90+3'; Nanchoff (yellow card) 90+4'	Report	Moloto 22'; LaGrassa (yellow card) 26'	Stadium: Al Lang Stadium; Attendance: 6,082; Referee: Daniel Gutierrez

June 22, 2018 14	Tampa Bay Rowdies	1–2	Penn FC	St. Petersburg
19:30 EDT (UTC−4)	Taylor 31' (Schäfer), (red card) 51'; Schäfer (yellow card) 39'; Magalhães (yellow card) 48'; Hristov (yellow card) 55'; Cole (yellow card) 85'	Report	Tribbett (yellow card) 27'; Mkosana 49', 67' (Opoku); Franco (yellow card) 88'	Stadium: Al Lang Stadium; Attendance: 5,369; Referee: Mark Allatin
Note: Match rescheduled from June 23 to avoid conflict with the St. Pete Pride Parade.

June 27, 2018 15	Charlotte Independence	2–2	Tampa Bay Rowdies	Matthews
19:30 EDT (UTC−4)	Herrera 57' (Cato); Cato 64' (Herrera); Johnson (yellow card) 86' (yellow-red card) 89'; Smith (red card) 90+2'	Report	Gorskie (yellow card) 44'; Mkandawire 66'; Lachowecki (yellow card) 78'; Oduro 90'	Stadium: Sportsplex at Matthews; Attendance: 1,399; Referee: Marcos de Oliveira

July 4, 2018 16	Tampa Bay Rowdies	3–1	Toronto FC II	St. Petersburg
18:00 EDT (UTC−4)	Hristov 8' (Fitzgerald); Taylor (yellow card) 27', (goal) 54' (Fernandes); Cole 79' (Oduro)	Report	Romeo (yellow card) 30'; Dunn-Johnson (yellow card) 47'; Fitzgerald 58' (o.g.)	Stadium: Al Lang Stadium; Attendance: 5,221; Referee: Elvis Osmanovic

July 7, 2018 17	Tampa Bay Rowdies	1–2	Louisville City FC	St. Petersburg
19:30 EDT (UTC−4)	Flemmings 71' (Bonomo)	Report	Smith 22' (McCabe); Craig (yellow card) 41'; Williams (yellow card) 44'; McMahon (yellow card) 51'; Lancaster 76'; DelPiccolo (yellow card) 88'	Stadium: Al Lang Stadium; Attendance: 5,232; Referee: Guido Gonzalez

July 14, 2018 18	FC Cincinnati	2–0	Tampa Bay Rowdies	Cincinnati
19:30 EDT (UTC−4)	Ledesma 54' (Bone), (yellow card) 63'; König 54' (Welshman)	Report	Flemmings (yellow card) 23'	Stadium: Nippert Stadium; Attendance: 25,416; Referee: Malik Badawi

July 21, 2018 19	Tampa Bay Rowdies	3–1	Indy Eleven	St. Petersburg
19:30 EDT (UTC−4)	Bonomo 12' (Flemmings); Hristov 19' (Flemmings), (yellow card) 29'; Flemmings (yellow card) 54', (goal) 89' (Hristov); Cole (yellow card) 62'	Report	Starikov 20' (Pasher); Venegas (yellow card) 39'; Matern (yellow card) 49'; Ring (yellow card) 90+2'	Stadium: Al Lang Stadium; Attendance: 5,378; Referee: Matthew Miscannon

July 28, 2018 20	Tampa Bay Rowdies	2–2	New York Red Bulls II	St. Petersburg
19:30 EDT (UTC−4)	Bonomo 8' (pen.), 9' (Flemmings), (yellow card) 35'; Oduro (yellow card) 45+2'; Flemmings (red card) 45+9'; Mizell (yellow card) 88'	Report	Stroud 2' (Barlow); Ndam (yellow card) 17'; White 62' (Lema)	Stadium: Al Lang Stadium; Attendance: 5,784; Referee: Elvis Osmanovic

August 3, 2018 21	Ottawa Fury FC	2–0	Tampa Bay Rowdies	Ottawa
19:00 EDT (UTC−4)	Taylor 1' (Duba); Reid (yellow card) 45+1'; Attakora 53' (Oliveira)	Report	Gorskie (yellow card) 79'; Diakité (yellow card) 83'	Stadium: TD Place; Attendance: 4,226; Referee: David Barrie

August 8, 2018 22	Tampa Bay Rowdies	0–0	Charleston Battery	St. Petersburg
19:30 EDT (UTC−4)	Oduro (yellow card) 58'; Cole (yellow card) 86'	Report	Candela (yellow card) 23'	Stadium: Al Lang Stadium; Attendance: 5,028; Referee: Guido Gonzalez Jr.

August 11, 2018 23	Tampa Bay Rowdies	0–2	North Carolina FC	St. Petersburg
19:30 EDT (UTC−4)	Diakité (yellow card) 13'	Report	Tobin (yellow card) 6' da Luz (yellow card) 51'; Kandziora 65' (Miller); Ríos 78' (Bekker)	Stadium: Al Lang Stadium; Attendance: 4,876; Referee: Luis Guardia

August 22, 2018 24	Pittsburgh Riverhounds	1–1	Tampa Bay Rowdies	Pittsburgh
19:00 EDT (UTC−4)	Dabo 45+2' (Brett); Vancaeyezeele (yellow card) 62'	Report	Flemmings 72' (Vingaard); Vega (yellow card) 90+4'	Stadium: Highmark Stadium; Attendance: 1,910; Referee: Marcos de Oliveira

August 25, 2018 25	Tampa Bay Rowdies	1–2	FC Cincinnati	St. Petersburg
19:30 EDT (UTC−4)	Taku (yellow card) 1'; Cole (yellow card) 15'; Poku (yellow card) 43', (goal) 75'; Portillos (yellow card) 68'; Oduro (yellow card) 80'; Diakité (yellow card) 82' (yellow-red card) 85'	Report	Ledesma 2' (pen.), 86' (pen.); Smith (yellow card) 50' (yellow-red card) 62'; Barrett (yellow card) 88'; Newton (yellow card) 90+2'	Stadium: Al Lang Stadium; Attendance: 5,963; Referee: Kevin Broadley

September 1, 2018 26	North Carolina FC	0–3	Tampa Bay Rowdies	Cary
19:00 EDT (UTC−4)	Guillen (yellow card) 61'; Lomis (yellow card) 76'; Tobin (yellow card) 81' da Luz (yellow card) 90+2'	Report	Guenzatti 23' (Flemmings), 43' (Flemmings), 56' (Fernandes); Oduro (yellow card) 48'	Stadium: WakeMed Soccer Park; Attendance: 4,102; Referee: Matthew Franz

September 8, 2018 27	Charleston Battery	1–0	Tampa Bay Rowdies	Charleston
19:00 EDT (UTC−4)	Okonkwo 22'; Bolt (yellow card) 55'; Archer (yellow card) 90+6'	Report	Guenzatti (yellow card) 81'	Stadium: MUSC Health Stadium; Attendance: 2,949; Referee: Rubiel Vazquez

September 15, 2018 28	Tampa Bay Rowdies	1–0	Atlanta United 2	St. Petersburg
19:30 EDT (UTC−4)	Guenzatti 30' (Poku); Oduro (yellow card) 45+1'; Cole (yellow card) 87'	Report	Kissiedou (yellow card) 44'; Kendall-Moullin (yellow card) 51'; Shannon (yellow card) 79'	Stadium: Al Lang Stadium; Attendance: 6,045; Referee: Daniel Gutierrez

September 18, 2018 29	Nashville SC	1–2	Tampa Bay Rowdies	Nashville
20:30 EDT (UTC−4)	Moloto 20'	Report	Hristov 6' (pen.); Morad (yellow card) 46'; Woodberry 69' (o.g.); Guenzatti (yellow card) 90+7'; Vega (yellow card) 90+7'	Stadium: First Tennessee Park; Attendance: 7,269; Referee: Malik Badawi

September 22, 2018 30	Tampa Bay Rowdies	3–0	Richmond Kickers	St. Petersburg
19:30 EDT (UTC−4)	Gorskie 49' (Hristov); Chavez 57' (Taku), (yellow card) 58'; Flemmings 90+3' (Cole)	Report	Umar (yellow card) 9'; Hlavaty (yellow card) 18'; Williams (yellow card) 87'	Stadium: Al Lang Stadium; Attendance: 6,472; Referee: Lukas Szpala

September 26, 2018 31	Indy Eleven	2–0	Tampa Bay Rowdies	Indianapolis
19:00 EDT (UTC−4)	Ouimette 37' (Ayoze); Fôn Williams (yellow card) 74'; Collier 75'	Report	9,123	Stadium: Lucas Oil Stadium; Referee: Daniel Radford

October 3, 2018 32	Atlanta United 2	1–1	Tampa Bay Rowdies	Lawrenceville
19:00 EDT (UTC−4)	Robinson (yellow card) 60', (goal) 90+3'; Wheeler-Omiunu (yellow card) 62'; Shannon (yellow card) 65'; Carleton (yellow card) 83'; Kendall-Moulin (red card) 90+2'	Report	Morad (yellow card) 20'; Guenzatti 68'; Oduro (yellow card) 75'	Stadium: Coolray Field; Attendance: 1,269; Referee: Jon Freemon

October 6, 2018 33	Tampa Bay Rowdies	1–2	Charlotte Independence	St. Petersburg
19:30 EDT (UTC−4)	Gorskie (yellow card) 75'; Taylor 80' (Guenzatti); Vega (red card) 90+7'	Report	Voser 26' (Zayed), (yellow card) 84'; Gebhard 32' (Cato); Miller (yellow card) 82'	Stadium: Al Lang Stadium; Attendance: 7,709; Referee: Luis Guardia

October 14, 2018 34	Bethlehem Steel FC	1–0	Tampa Bay Rowdies	Bethlehem
15:00 EDT (UTC−4)	Ngalina 13' (Aaronson); Chambers (yellow card) 44'; Herbers (yellow card) 76'	Report		Stadium: Goodman Stadium; Attendance: 262; Referee: Sergii Demianchuk

=== U.S. Open Cup ===
May 16 2nd round	Jacksonville Armada FC (Florida)	1–0	(Florida) Tampa Bay Rowdies	Jacksonville, Florida
7:00 PM EDT	Melvin (yellow card) 27'; Banks 58'; Beckie (yellow card) 90+'	Report	Fernandes (yellow card) 14'; Blake (yellow card) 62'; Nanchoff (yellow card) 69'	Stadium: Southern Oak Stadium; Attendance: 374; Referee: Matthew Miscannon
