= Lance Rozeboom =

American soccer player (born 1989)

Personal information
- Full name: Lance Rozeboom
- Date of birth: May 31, 1989 (age 37)
- Place of birth: Walker, Iowa, United States
- Height: 1.85 m (6 ft 1 in)
- Position: Midfielder

Team information
- Current team: Des Moines Menace

Youth career
- 2002–2007: Cedar River SA

College career
Years	Team	Apps	(Gls)
2008–2011	New Mexico	79	(6)

Senior career*
Years	Team	Apps	(Gls)
2007–2009	Des Moines Menace	25	(1)
2012	D.C. United	0	(0)
2013–2014	Rochester Rhinos	49	(1)
2015	Austin Aztex	28	(0)
2016–2017	Ottawa Fury	52	(2)
2018	Tampa Bay Rowdies	17	(1)
2019–2021	Miami FC	32	(0)
2022–	Des Moines Menace	0	(0)
- * Club domestic league appearances and goals as of November 4, 2021

Lance Rozeboom (born May 31, 1989) is an American soccer player.

== Career ==
=== College and amateur ===
Rozeboom spent his entire college career at the University of New Mexico. In his freshman year in 2008, he made 16 appearances for the Lobos, but didn't record a goal or an assist that year. In 2009, he made started all 20 games for the Lobos and finished with a goal and an assist each. His lone goal came in the first round of the 2009 NCAA College Cup against the University of Portland. Unfortunately, New Mexico would end up losing that match 2–1 in extra time. Rozeboom went on to be named Second team All-Mountain Pacific Sports Federation, Academic All-MPSF and ESPN the Magazine Academic All-District VI First Team in 2009. In 2010, he started all 20 games for the Lobos and finished with two goals and two assists on his way to being named First Team All-MPSF and Third Team All-West. In 2011, he started all 22 games and finished with three goals and two assists on his way to being named First-Team All-MPSF, First-Team All-Far West and was named to Top Drawer Soccer's Top 100 list (No. 37).

Rozeboom also played three years with Des Moines Menace in the USL Premier Development League.

=== Professional ===
On January 17, 2012, Rozeboom was drafted in the second round (26th overall) of the 2012 MLS Supplemental Draft by D.C. United. After an impressive preseason, he signed a professional contract with the club on March 7. On March 23, Rozeboom suffered a Torn ACL during training and was ruled out for the rest of the season. He was released from the club on February 27, 2013, without making a single appearance for the club.

On March 20, 2013, Rozeboom joined USL Pro club Rochester Rhinos for the 2013 season. He made his professional debut on April 13 in a 3–0 defeat to VSI Tampa Bay FC.

On November 17, 2014, it was announced Rozeboom have moved to new USL Pro franchise Austin Aztex.

On December 18, 2015, Rozeboom and fellow Austin teammate Fernando Timbó were signed by Ottawa Fury FC of the North American Soccer League. He was re-signed for the 2017 season as the team jumped to the United Soccer League and latter named the third captain in team history.

Rozeboom signed with fellow USL club Tampa Bay Rowdies on January 8, 2018.

== Career statistics ==
As of November 4, 2021.

Club	Season	League			National Cup (Note: Includes appearances in Canadian Championship and U.S. Open Cup. Note, two early round Open Cup matches list Rozeboom on playing but are not listed on Soccerway. These are: 2013 Second Round versus GPS Portland Phoenix and 2015 First Round versus Laredo Heat.)		Other (Note: Includes appearances in the league playoffs.)		Total	
Club	Season	Division	Apps	Goals	Apps	Goals	Apps	Goals	Apps	Goals
D.C. United	2012	MLS	0	0	0	0	0	0	0	0
Rochester Rhinos	2013	USL Pro	24	1	2	0	0	0	26	1
Rochester Rhinos	2014	USL Pro	25	0	1	0	0	0	26	0
Rochester Rhinos	Total		49	1	3	0	0	0	52	1
Austin Aztex	2015	USL	28	0	3	0	0	0	31	0
Ottawa Fury FC	2016	USL	31	1	4	0	0	0	35	1
Ottawa Fury FC	2017	USL	21	1	4	0	0	0	25	1
Ottawa Fury FC	Total		52	2	8	0	0	0	60	2
Tampa Bay Rowdies	2018	USL	17	1	1	0	0	0	18	1
Miami FC	2019	NPSL	10	0	1	0	6	0	17	0
Miami FC	2019	NISA	5	0	-	-	1	0	6	0
Miami FC	2020	USLC	14	0	-	-	0	0	14	0
Miami FC	2021	USLC	3	0	-	-	0	0	3	0
Miami FC	Total		32	0	1	0	7	0	40	0
Career total			178	4	16	0	7	0	201	4
