= Harrison Heath =

English footballer

Personal information
- Full name: Harrison William Heath
- Date of birth: 6 March 1996 (age 30)
- Place of birth: Newcastle-under-Lyme, England
- Position: Midfielder

Youth career
- 2011–2012: Houston Dynamo
- 2012–2014: Norwich City

Senior career*
Years	Team	Apps	(Gls)
2012	Orlando City U-23	2	(0)
2014–2016	Orlando City	13	(0)
2016	→ Orlando City B (loan)	12	(1)
2017	Atlanta United	1	(0)
2017	→ Sacramento Republic (loan)	2	(0)
2018	Minnesota United	4	(0)
2019–2020	Miami FC	25	(0)
- * Club domestic league appearances and goals

Harrison William Heath (born 6 March 1996) is an English former professional footballer who played as a midfielder.

== Career ==
=== Youth career ===
Heath played in the youth academy of Houston Dynamo from 2011 to 2012 before moving to England to play for Norwich City's academy from 2012 to 2014, where he was part of the U18 squad that won the 2013 FA Youth Cup. In between his time at Houston and Norwich, Heath played for Orlando City U-23 and took part in two games.

=== Orlando City ===
Heath signed his first professional contract with Orlando City on 17 July 2014. This would be their last season in the United Soccer League before moving to Major League Soccer. During this final USL season, Heath appeared in 8 matches, starting 5 of them.

The next season he was kept with the team as they made their inaugural campaign into Major League Soccer. Heath was able to make three appearances in each of the team's first two seasons in the league. However, in his second season in MLS he was loaned to Orlando's reserve team, Orlando City B in March 2016. While with the reserves, Heath made 13 appearances in the USL.

=== Atlanta and Minnesota ===
On 11 December 2016 Heath was traded to Atlanta United FC by Orlando in exchange for a fourth-round pick in the 2019 MLS SuperDraft. Heath was subsequently loaned out to Sacramento Republic, where he made two appearances for the senior team. After only making one appearance for Atlanta, Heath was released by the team at the end of their 2017 season.

On 10 December 2017, Heath was signed by Minnesota United where he was reunited with his father Adrian Heath. Minnesota sent a fourth-round pick in the 2019 MLS SuperDraft to Atlanta for the MLS rights to Heath. Heath was only able to make four appearances for Minnesota, however, and was released at the end of Minnesota's 2018 season.

=== Miami FC ===
Heath signed with the National Premier Soccer League's defending champions, Miami FC, on 20 February 2019. Heath made four appearances during the 2019 NPSL season, which is only played during the summer, and the team successfully defended their title and won the league. Heath subsequently made the jump with the team to the inaugural season of the National Independent Soccer Association, however he did not make the bench for the team's first match against the Philadelphia Fury.

On 7 January 2020 it was announced that Heath re-signed with the team for the 2020 season, meaning that he would move with the team from NISA to the USL Championship.

Following several months away from playing Heath announced his retirement from professional football on 1 January 2022.

== Personal life ==
Harrison Heath is the son of retired footballer and former head coach of Minnesota United FC, Adrian Heath. Harrison holds a U.S. green card which qualifies him as a domestic player for MLS roster purposes.

He is married to Kaylyn Kyle. They welcomed their first child in June 2018, Hayden Jack Heath.

== Career statistics ==
As of 4 October 2020

Club	Season	League			Cup (Note: All appearances in the U.S. Open Cup)		Continental		Other		Total	
Club	Season	Division	Apps	Goals	Apps	Goals	Apps	Goals	Apps	Goals	Apps	Goals
Orlando City U-23	2012	PDL	2	0	0	0	—		0	0	2	0
Orlando City	2014	USL Pro	7	0	0	0	—		1 (Note: Appearance in the USL Cup playoffs)	0	8	0
Orlando City	2015	MLS	3	0	2	0	—		—		5	0
Orlando City	2016	MLS	3	0	2	0	—		—		5	0
Orlando City	Total		13	0	4	0	0	0	1	0	18	0
Orlando City B (loan)	2016	USL	12	1	—		—		1	0	13	1
Atlanta United	2017	MLS	1	0	1	0	—		0	0	2	0
Sacramento Republic (loan)	2017	USL	2	0	0	0	—		0	0	2	0
Minnesota United	2018	MLS	4	0	0	0	—		—		4	0
Miami FC	2019	NPSL	4	0	1	0	—		2 (Note: Appearances in the NPSL playoffs)	1	7	1
Miami FC	2019–20	NISA	5	0	—		—		1 (Note: Appearance in the NISA playoffs)	0	6	0
Miami FC	2020	USL Championship	16	0	0	0	—		0	0	16	0
Miami FC	Total		25	0	1	0	0	0	3	1	29	1
Career total			59	1	6	0	0	0	5	1	70	2

== Honours ==
Orlando City

- USL Pro (1): 2014

Miami FC

- NPSL (1): 2019 Sunshine Conference, South Region, National Championship
- NISA (1): 2019 East Coast Championship
