= Bryant Martin Gammiero =

American soccer player

Bryant Gammiero
Personal information
- Full name: Bryant Martin Gammiero
- Date of birth: November 2, 1993 (age 33)
- Place of birth: Miami, Florida, United States
- Height: 1.79 m (5 ft 10 1/2 in)
- Position: Goalkeeper

Youth career
- Atlético Venezuela

Senior career*
Years	Team	Apps	(Gls)
2018	Miami United	5	(0)
2019	Florida Soccer Soldiers		
2019–2020	Miami FC	6	(0)
- * Club domestic league appearances and goals as of September 2, 2020

Bryant Martin Gammiero is an American soccer player who plays as a goalkeeper.

== Career ==
=== Semi-professional & Professional ===
Gammiero played with NPSL side Miami United in 2018. In May 2019, he joined United Premier Soccer League side Florida Soccer Soldiers, featuring for the amateur club in its notable run in the Lamar Hunt US Open Cup, reaching the third round with wins over Miami FC and USL Championship's Charlotte Independence.

In September 2020, Gammiero joined Miami FC for their NISA season, making a single appearance. He stayed with the side during their move to the USL Championship in 2020. He made his USL debut on August 16, 2020, earning Miami its first league point in a 1–1 draw against rival Tampa Bay Rowdies.

== Career statistics ==
As of matches played September 2, 2020.

Club	Season	League			Cup (Note: Includes appearances in U.S. Open Cup)		League Cup		Total	
Club	Season	Division	Apps	Goals	Apps	Goals	Apps	Goals	Apps	Goals
Miami United	2018	National Premier Soccer League	5	0	0	0	0	0	5	0
Florida Soccer Soldiers	Spring 2019	United Premier Soccer League	-		3	0	2	0	5	0
Miami FC	2019	National Independent Soccer Association	1	0	-		0	0	1	0
Miami FC	2020	USL Championship	5	0	0	0	0	0	5	0
Miami FC	Total		6	0	0	0	0	0	6	0
Career total			11	0	3	0	2	0	16	0

== Honors ==
Miami FC

National Independent Soccer Association
East Coast Championship (1): 2019
