= Héctor Morales (footballer, born 1993) =

Cuban footballer

Personal information
- Full name: Hector Javier Morales Sanchez
- Date of birth: 19 January 1993 (age 33)
- Place of birth: Havana, Cuba
- Height: 1.83 m (6 ft 0 in)
- Position: Midfielder

Senior career*
Years	Team	Apps	(Gls)
- La Habana
2016–2017	AFC Ann Arbor	21	(3)
2019–2020	Miami FC	17	(1)

International career^{‡}
2013	Cuba U20	12	(0)
2014	Cuba U21	3	(0)
2016	Cuba U23	3	(0)
- * Club domestic league appearances and goals as of 23 September 2020 ‡ National team caps and goals as of 10 July 2016

Hector Javier Morales Sanchez (born 19 January 1993) is a Cuban footballer who plays as a midfielder.

== Career ==
On July 29, 2020, Morales made his USL debut with Miami FC in the team's second match of the 2020 season. He had previously played with the team during 2019 in both the National Premier Soccer League and National Independent Soccer Association.

== Career statistics ==
As of matches played 23 September 2020

Club	Season	League			Cup (Note: Includes appearances in U.S. Open Cup)		League Cup		Total	
Club	Season	Division	Apps	Goals	Apps	Goals	Apps	Goals	Apps	Goals
AFC Ann Arbor	2016	NPSL	12	2	0	0	6	0	18	2
AFC Ann Arbor	2017	NPSL	9	1	0	0	2	0	11	1
AFC Ann Arbor	Total		21	3	0	0	8	0	29	3
Miami FC	2019	NPSL	8	1	0	0	5	1	13	2
Miami FC	2019	NISA	4	0	-	-	0	0	4	0
Miami FC	2020	USL Championship	5	0	0	0	0	0	5	0
Miami FC	Total		17	1	0	0	5	1	22	2
Career total			38	4	0	0	13	1	51	5

== Honors ==
AFC Ann Arbor
Great Lakes Conference Championship (1): 2017

Miami FC
NPSL

Sunshine Conference Championship (1): 2019
South Region Championship (1): 2019
National Championship (1): 2019

NISA

East Coast Conference Championship (1): 2019
