= Amadou Macky Diop =

Senegalese footballer (born 1995)

Personal information
- Date of birth: August 17, 1995 (age 31)
- Place of birth: Dakar, Senegal
- Height: 1.90 m (6 ft 3 in)
- Position: Forward

Team information
- Current team: Kathmandu Rayzrs
- Number: 11

Youth career
- 2008–2013: Diambars

College career
Years	Team	Apps	(Gls)
2018–2019	Radford Highlanders	16	(13)

Senior career*
Years	Team	Apps	(Gls)
2013–2018	Diambars		
2015–2016	→ Dinamo Zagreb II (loan)	20	(3)
2019	New York Red Bulls U23	6	(4)
2020–2021	Atlanta United 2	32	(9)
2022	Birmingham Legion	7	(1)
2022	Detroit City	7	(0)
- * Club domestic league appearances and goals

Amadou Macky Diop (born 17 August 1995) is a Senegalese professional footballer.

== Career ==
=== Diambars ===
Diop began his career with Senegalese side Diambars, joining their academy aged 13-years old. During his time with Diambars, Diop spent a season on loan with Dinamo Zagreb.

=== Radford University ===
Diop moved to the United States to play college soccer at Radford University, where he scored 13 goals and tallied 5 assists in 16 appearances.

While at college, Diop also appeared for USL League Two amateur side New York Red Bulls U23.

=== Atlanta United 2 ===
On 19 November 2019, it was announced that Diop would sign for USL Championship side Atlanta United 2 ahead of their 2020 season. He made his debut for Atlanta on 11 July 2020, appearing as a 69th-minute substitute in a 2-1 loss against the Tampa Bay Rowdies. Diop scored his first and second goals for Atlanta on July 30, 2020, during a 4-3 victory over Miami FC. Diop was released by Atlanta following the 2021 season.

=== Birmingham Legion ===
On 9 December 2021, it was announced that Diop would join USL Championship side Birmingham Legion ahead of their 2022 season. Diop made his debut for Birmingham on March 13, 2022 during a 1-1 draw with the Tampa Bay Rowdies. He scored his first and only goal for Birmingham on April 24, 2022, the game winner in a 2-1 victory over Loudoun United FC.

=== Detroit City ===
On 27 April 2022, Diop was traded to fellow USL Championship club Detroit City. Diop made his debut for Detroit City on May 7, 2022, during a 3-1 loss to FC Tulsa. He left Detroit following their 2022 season.

== Career statistics ==
As of 9 June 2022

Appearances and goals by club, season and competition
Club	Season	League			Playoffs		Cup		Continental		Total	
Club	Season	Division	Apps	Goals	Apps	Goals	Apps	Goals	Apps	Goals	Apps	Goals
Dinamo Zagreb II	2015-16	Druga HNL	20	3	—		—		—		20	3
Atlanta United 2	2020	USL Championship	12	6	—		—		—		12	6
Atlanta United 2	2021	USL Championship	20	3	—		—		—		20	3
Atlanta United 2	Total		32	9	—		—		—		32	9
Birmingham Legion	2022	USL Championship	7	1	—		2	0	—		9	1
Detroit City FC	2022	USL Championship	6	0	—		0	0	—		6	0
Career total			65	13	0	0	2	0	0	0	67	13
