= Othello Bah =

Liberian footballer (born 1995)

Personal information
- Full name: Siryee Bah
- Date of birth: 27 April 1995 (age 31)
- Place of birth: Virginia, Liberia
- Height: 5 ft 7 in (1.70 m)
- Positions: Fullback; forward

College career
Years	Team	Apps	(Gls)
2014–2016	Tennessee Wesleyan Bulldogs	48	(14)
2017	Nova Southeastern Sharks	2	(0)

Senior career*
Years	Team	Apps	(Gls)
2015–2017	Chattanooga FC		
2019–2022	Miami FC	60	(8)

International career^{‡}
2021	Liberia	1	(0)
- * Club domestic league appearances and goals as of 01:41, 6 November 2021 (UTC) ‡ National team caps and goals as of 01:32, 18 June 2021 (UTC)

Siryee "Othello" Bah (born 27 April 1995) is a Liberian former footballer who played his entire career in the United States and made a single appearance for the Liberian national team.

== Career ==
=== College ===
Bah played college soccer at Tennessee Wesleyan University for three seasons before transferring to Nova Southeastern University in 2017.

=== Semi-professional & Professional ===
Bah played in the NPSL with Chattanooga FC from 2015 to 2017 while also in college. He later played with Miami FC in their NPSL and NISA seasons in 2019 and continued with the club as they moved to the USL Championship in 2020. On 27 September 2022, Bah announced his retirement from professional football.

== International career ==
Bah made his Liberia national football team debut on June 17, 2021, in a 5–1 loss to Algeria.

== Career statistics ==
As of matches played 4 October 2020.

Club	Season	League			Cup (Note: Includes appearances in U.S. Open Cup)		League Cup		Total	
Club	Season	Division	Apps	Goals	Apps	Goals	Apps	Goals	Apps	Goals
Miami FC	2019	National Premier Soccer League	8	0	0	0	6	0	14	0
Miami FC	2019	National Independent Soccer Association	3	1	-	-	1	0	4	1
Miami FC	2020	USL Championship	11	0	0	0	0	0	11	0
Miami FC	Total		22	1	0	0	7	0	29	1
Career total			22	1	0	0	7	0	29	1
