= Leon Taylor (soccer) =

American soccer player

Personal information
- Date of birth: May 19, 1993 (age 33)
- Place of birth: Dallas, Texas, United States
- Height: 1.90 m (6 ft 3 in)
- Position: Forward

Youth career
- 2010: Plano West HS

College career
Years	Team	Apps	(Gls)
2011	Oral Roberts Golden Eagles	2	(0)
2012–2013	Incarnate Word Cardinals	31	(6)
2014–2016	Midwestern State Mustangs	39	(8)

Senior career*
Years	Team	Apps	(Gls)
2015	Laredo Heat	11	(3)
2016	Midland-Odessa Sockers FC	5	(1)
2017	Bodens BK	24	(8)
2018–2019	Tampa Bay Rowdies	20	(4)
- * Club domestic league appearances and goals as of October 24, 2019

Leon Taylor (born May 19, 1993) is an American professional soccer player.

== Youth career ==
Taylor attended Plano West Senior High School where he played both football and soccer. He joined Club Bolivar in LaPaz Bolivia for a stint in 2010. Taylor returned to the U.S. to play in the Dallas Cup for the Bolivian team. He first played college soccer at Oral Roberts University in Oklahoma, before transferring to the University of the Incarnate Word in San Antonio, Texas and then on to Midwestern State University in Wichita Falls.

== Professional career ==
During his college years, Taylor also played for the Laredo Heat and the Midland-Odessa Sockers FC of the fourth-tier Premier Development League. After college, he signed a contract in the Swedish Division 2 with Bodens BK in 2017 where Taylor quickly made a name for himself leading the team in goals and assists. Shortly after returning to America, Taylor signed a contract with the Tampa Bay Rowdies.
