= Mohamed Thiaw =

American soccer player

Personal information
- Full name: Mohamed Thiaw
- Date of birth: January 24, 1995 (age 31)
- Place of birth: Dakar, Senegal
- Height: 1.88 m (6 ft 2 in)
- Position: Forward

Youth career
- 2011-2014: Bryan Station High School
- 2012-2014: Lexington FC

College career
| Years | Team | Apps | (Gls) |
| 2014–2016 | Cincinnati State | 34 | (41) |
| 2016–2017 | Louisville Cardinals | 41 | (20) |

Senior career*
| Years | Team | Apps | (Gls) |
| 2016 | Portland Timbers U23s | 6 | (0) |
| 2018 | San Jose Earthquakes | 0 | (0) |
| 2018 | → Reno 1868 (loan) | 24 | (3) |
| 2019–2020 | Miami FC | 30 | (17) |
- * Club domestic league appearances and goals as of 4 October 2020

Mohamed Thiaw (born January 24, 1995) is a Senegalese soccer player.

== Career ==
=== College ===
Born in Dakar, Senegal, Thiaw moved to Lexington, Kentucky as a 15-year-old where he attended Bryan Station High School and after graduation attended Cincinnati State Technical and Community College, where he played OCCAC soccer for two seasons and scored 41 goals in 34 appearances. He was a two-time All-America selection for his performances at Cincinnati State.

Thiaw transferred to the University of Louisville in 2016 and played for the Cardinals for two seasons, scoring 20 goals in 41 appearances.

=== Professional ===
On January 10, 2018, Thiaw was selected 35th overall by the San Jose Earthquakes during the 2018 MLS SuperDraft. He was officially signed by the club on March 1, 2018, and immediately sent on loan to San Jose's USL affiliate Reno 1868 FC, alongside fellow SuperDraft pick Danny Musovski. Thiaw made his first professional appearance on March 24, 2018, as a 77th minute substitution for Brian Brown during Reno's 1–1 draw with Las Vegas Lights FC.

Thiaw was released by San Jose at the end of their 2018 season.

==== Indoor ====
In March 2021, Thiaw joined Metro Louisville FC of the Premier Arena Soccer League ahead of the 2020–21 National Tournament.

== Career statistics ==
As of matches played 4 October 2020.

| Club | Season | League | | | Cup (Note: Includes appearances in U.S. Open Cup) | | League Cup | | Total | |
| Club | Season | Division | Apps | Goals | Apps | Goals | Apps | Goals | Apps | Goals |
|---|---|---|---|---|---|---|---|---|---|---|
| San Jose | 2018 | MLS | 0 | 0 | 0 | 0 | 0 | 0 | 0 | 0 |
| San Jose | Total | | 0 | 0 | 0 | 0 | 0 | 0 | 0 | 0 |
| Reno (loan) | 2018 | USL | 7 | 1 | 0 | 0 | 0 | 0 | 7 | 1 |
| Reno (loan) | Total | | 7 | 1 | 0 | 0 | 0 | 0 | 7 | 1 |
| Miami FC | 2019 | NPSL | 9 | 10 | 1 | 0 | 6 | 2 | 16 | 12 |
| Miami FC | 2019 | NISA | 6 | 4 | - | - | 1 | 0 | 7 | 4 |
| Miami FC | 2020 | USLC | 15 | 1 | - | - | 0 | 0 | 15 | 1 |
| Miami FC | Total | | 30 | 15 | 1 | 0 | 7 | 2 | 38 | 17 |
| Career total | | | 37 | 16 | 1 | 0 | 7 | 2 | 45 | 18 |

== Honors ==
=== Collegiate ===
- 2015 Junior College Player of the Year
- 2016 NSCAA All-South Region Second Team
- 2016 TopDrawerSoccer.com Best XI Second Team
- 2016 All-ACC First Team
- 2017 All-ACC Second Team

=== Club ===
- 2019 NPSL National Champion
- 2019 NISA East Coast Championship
- 2026 WYSA Coed Adult League Champion
