= Alessandro Milesi (footballer) =

Peruvian footballer (born 1999)

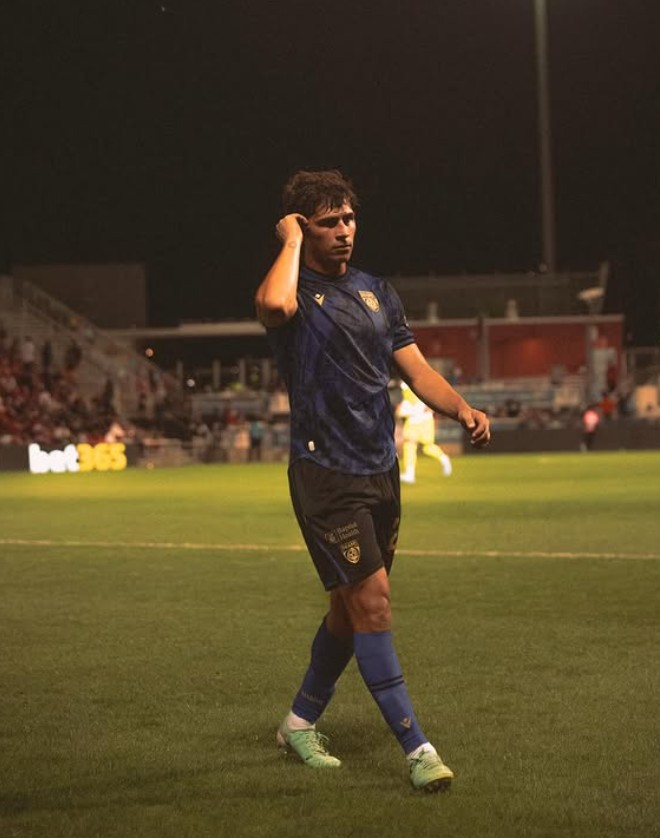
- Alessandro Milesi playing for Miami FC

Personal information
- Full name: Alessandro Milesi Germoni
- Date of birth: 21 December 1999 (age 26)
- Place of birth: Lima, Peru
- Height: 6 ft 1 in (1.85 m)
- Positions: Defender; midfielder

Team information
- Current team: Miami FC
- Number: 21

Youth career
- –2016: Esther Grande
- 2018–2019: Brescia

Senior career*
| Years | Team | Apps | (Gls) |
| 2019 | Brescia | 0 | (0) |
| 2019 | → Sicula Leonzio (loan) | 2 | (0) |
| 2019 | Miami FC | 2 | (0) |
| 2020–2021 | Sliema Wanderers F.C. | 23 | (2) |
| 2022 | Club Deportivo Universidad de San Martín de Porres | 4 | (0) |
| 2023 | Atlético Grau | 17 | (1) |
| 2024 | Alianza Atlético | 26 | (0) |
| 2025–2026 | Cusco FC | 18 | (0) |
| 2026– | Miami FC | 28 | (3) |

International career^{‡}
| 2014 | Peru U15 | 1 | (0) |
| 2019 | Peru U20 | 1 | (0) |
- * Club domestic league appearances and goals as of 13:36, 8 November 2026 (UTC) ‡ National team caps and goals as of 03:28, 15 August 2021 (UTC)

Alessandro Milesi (born 21 December 1999) is a Peruvian professional footballer currently playing with Miami F.C. in the USL Championship League. He is a left-footed defensive player who typically plays left wing-back but can also play center back.

== Career ==
He spent two years with the under-19 team of Brescia. During the 2018–19 season, Milesi trained with Brescia's senior squad and was named to the bench for two Serie B matches. While with the team, they won the Italian Second Division Championship in 2018.

In February 2019, he was loaned to Sicula Leonzio in Serie C, making two appearances against Vibonese and Casertana.

In September 2019, he signed a three-month contract with Miami FC in the newly-formed National Independent Soccer Association.

In July 2020, he signed a one-year contract with Sliema Wanderers in the Maltese Premier League where he played 23 matches and scored two goals.

In 2021, he signed for Deportivo San Martin in Lima, Peru where he had 5 appearances before suffering an ACL rupture.

On 15 December 2022, he joined Club Atlético Grau in Piura, a team which competes in Peruvian 1st Division.

On 15 December 2023, he joined Alianza Atletico in Sullana, which competes in Peruvian 1st Division.

On 15 December 2024, he joined Cusco FC in Cusco, Peru which competes in Peruvian 1st Division and qualified for local Peruvian playoffs of Copa Sudamericana. He played as a defender or midfielder. He played 18 games in the Liga 1 and accrued over 400 minutes played.

On 31 December 2025, he joined Miami F.C. as a left wing-back. He is a regular starter in the Championship season and scored 2 goals, including Miami F.C.'s first goal of the 2026 season, against Louisville F.C.

== International career ==
Alessandro was born in Lima, Peru, to Italian parents and spent most of his life in the United States. Consequently, he holds Peruvian, Italian and American nationality.

He was part of the Peru under-15 team that won the gold medal in the 2014 Youth Olympics in China. He also appeared for the Peru under-20 team at the 2019 South American Youth Football Championship.

== Career statistics ==
=== Club ===
As of December 2020.

| Club | Season | League | | | Cup | | Other | | Total | |
| Club | Season | Division | Apps | Goals | Apps | Goals | Apps | Goals | Apps | Goals |
|---|---|---|---|---|---|---|---|---|---|---|
| Brescia | 2018–19 | Serie B | 0 | 0 | 0 | 0 | 0 | 0 | 0 | 0 |
| Sicula Leonzio (loan) | 2018–19 | Serie C | 2 | 0 | 0 | 0 | 0 | 0 | 2 | 0 |
| Miami FC | 2019–20 | NISA | 2 | 0 | 0 | 0 | 0 | 0 | 2 | 0 |
| Sliema Wanderers | 2020-21 | Maltese Premier League | 23 | 2 | 0 | 0 | 0 | 0 | 23 | 2 |
| Deportivo San Martin | 2021-22 | Liga 1 (Peruvian 1st Division) | 4 | | | | | | | |
| Club Atletico Grau | 2022-23 | Liga 1 (Peruvian 1st Division) | 19 | 1 | | | | | | 1 |
| Alianza Atletico | 2023-24 | Liga 1 (Peruvian 1st Division) | 32 | | | | | | | |
| Cusco FC | 2024-25 | Liga 1 (Peruvian 1st Division) | 17 | | | | | | | |
| Miami FC | 2026 | USL Championship League | 15 | 2 | | | | | | 2 |
| Career total | | | 27 | 2 | 0 | 0 | 0 | 0 | 27 | 2 |
