= Brenton Griffiths =

Jamaican footballer (born 1991)

Personal information
- Full name: Brenton Griffiths
- Date of birth: 9 February 1991 (age 35)
- Place of birth: Spanish Town, Jamaica
- Height: 1.90 m (6 ft 3 in)
- Position: Defender

College career
Years	Team	Apps	(Gls)
2009–2010	TJC Apache		
2011–2012	South Florida Bulls	40	(4)

Senior career*
Years	Team	Apps	(Gls)
2013–2014	Colorado Rapids	1	(0)
2014–2016	Orange County Blues	58	(6)
2017–2018	Reno 1868	35	(2)
2019–2020	Miami FC	25	(3)

International career
2007	Jamaica U17	1	(0)
2008–2011	Jamaica U20	2	(0)
- * Club domestic league appearances and goals as of 23 September 2020

Brenton Griffiths (born 9 February 1991) is a Jamaican footballer who plays as a defender.

== Career ==
=== Youth ===
Griffiths played for St. Catherine High School in the parish St Catherine and Glenmuir High School in Clarendon, Jamaica before earning a soccer scholarship to Tyler Junior College in Texas. After Tyler JC, he spent two years at the University of South Florida.

=== Senior ===
On 22 January 2013, Griffiths was drafted in the second round (25th overall) of the 2013 MLS Supplemental Draft by the Colorado Rapids and signed to a professional contract three months later. He made his professional debut on 18 May 2013 in a 1–1 draw with the San Jose Earthquakes. He was released by the team on 11 June 2014.

In 2014, Griffiths signed with the Orange County Blues.

In 2016, Griffiths signed with Reno 1868 FC for the 2017 season. Griffiths was released by Reno on 3 December 2018.

Griffiths joined National Premier Soccer League club Miami FC in January 2019.

=== International ===
Griffiths played for Jamaica at the U17 and u20 level.

== Honours ==
Miami FC

- 2019 NPSL Champion
- 2019 NISA East Coast Championship
