= Mark Pais =

American soccer player (born 1991)

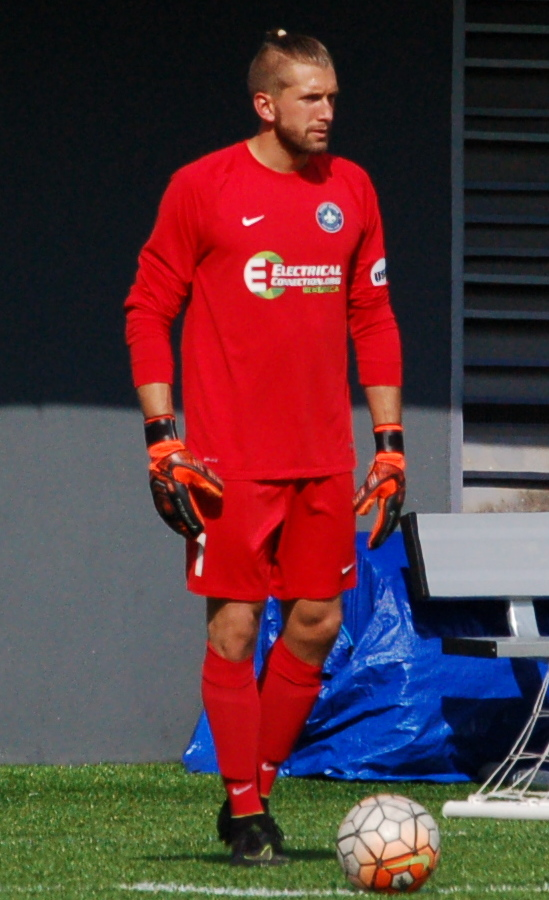
- Pais playing for Saint Louis FC in 2016

Personal information
- Date of birth: June 3, 1991 (age 35)
- Place of birth: St. Louis, Missouri, United States
- Height: 1.92 m (6 ft 4 in)
- Position: Goalkeeper

College career
Years	Team	Apps	(Gls)
2009–2011	Saint Louis Billikens	16	(0)
2012	Tulsa Golden Hurricane	21	(0)

Senior career*
Years	Team	Apps	(Gls)
2013	Des Moines Menace	2	(0)
2015–2016	Saint Louis FC	29	(0)
2017	Toronto FC II	2	(0)
2017	Toronto FC	0	(0)
2017	→ Toronto FC II (loan)	11	(0)
2018	Fresno FC	2	(0)
2019–2020	Miami FC	23	(0)

Managerial career
- 2023–: St. Louis City SC Academy (goalkeepers)
- * Club domestic league appearances and goals as of February 19, 2026

Mark Gregory Pais (born June 3, 1991) is an American soccer player who plays as a goalkeeper who was St. Louis City SC Academy goalkeeper coach.

== Career ==
=== College ===
Pais began his college career at Saint Louis University in 2009, before transferring in his senior year to the University of Tulsa.

After college, Pais played with USL PDL club Des Moines Menace during the 2013 season.

=== Professional ===
Pais signed with USL club Saint Louis FC on January 15, 2015.

== Honors ==
=== Club ===
Toronto FC

- MLS Cup: 2017

Miami FC

- NPSL National Championship: 2019
- NISA East Coast Championship: 2019
