= Tomás Granitto =

Salvadoran footballer (born 1993)

Personal information
- Full name: Tomás Granitto Heesch
- Date of birth: June 12, 1993 (age 33)
- Place of birth: San Salvador, El Salvador
- Height: 1.80 m (5 ft 11 in)
- Position: Midfielder

Team information
- Current team: Águila
- Number: 5

Youth career
- 2010: Estudiantes

College career
Years	Team	Apps	(Gls)
2011–2012	Florida Gulf Coast Eagles	15	(0)

Senior career*
Years	Team	Apps	(Gls)
2013–2014	Luis Ángel Firpo	8	(0)
2015	FC Edmonton	15	(0)
2016	Swope Park Rangers	26	(1)
2017	Portland Timbers 2	20	(0)
2018	Miami United	11	(2)
2019–2020	Miami FC	17	(1)
2021–2022	FAS	45	(0)
2022	Águila	14	(0)
2023	All Boys	13	(0)
2023–	Águila	71	(2)

International career^{‡}
2013	El Salvador U20		
2019–2021	El Salvador	3	(0)
- * Club domestic league appearances and goals as of 7 November 2023 ‡ National team caps and goals as of 27 March 2019

Tomás Granitto Heesch (born June 12, 1993) is a Salvadoran professional footballer who plays for Águila.

== Club career ==
Granitto played college soccer at Florida Gulf Coast University, before signing with Salvadoran club CD Luis Ángel Firpo in 2013.

After leaving Firpo, Granitto spent time with the reserve team of FC Dallas, before joining North American Soccer League side FC Edmonton on November 12, 2014.

On March 4, 2016, Granitto signed with USL side the Swope Park Rangers.

Granitto joined USL side Portland Timbers 2 in March 2017. In February 2018, he joined Miami United for the 2018 NPSL season.

On 4 February 2021, Granitto returned to El Salvador, joining FAS on a one-year contract. On 6 December 2021, after losing in the playoffs against Chalatenango, he announced that he would be leaving the club at the end of his contract.

On 8 September 2022, he joined Primera División rival, Águila.

On 28 December 2022, Granitto joined All Boys in the Argentine second division. After his short stint at All Boys, he returned to Águila in El Salvador.

== International career ==
Granitto made his debut for the senior El Salvador national team on March 26, 2019. The match was a 2–0 victory for El Salvador over Peru, played at RFK Stadium in Washington, D.C.

== Career statistics ==
=== Club ===
As of 6 December 2023

Appearances and goals by club, season and competition
Club	Season	League			National Cup		Continental		Total	
Club	Season	Division	Apps	Goals	Apps	Goals	Apps	Goals	Apps	Goals
Firpo	2013–14	Salvadoran Primera División	7	0	0	0	1 (Note: Appearance in CONCACAF Champions League)	0	8	0
FC Dallas II	2014	USL Championship	1	0	0	0	0	0	1	0
Edmonton	2015	North American Soccer League	14	0	3	0	0	0	17	0
Sporting Kansas City II	2016	USL Championship	27	1	0	0	0	0	27	1
Sporting Kansas City	2016	Major League Soccer	0	0	0	0	1	0	1	0
Portland Timbers 2	2017	USL Championship	20	0	0	0	0	0	20	20
Miami United	2019	USL Championship	11	2	3	2	0	0	14	4
Miami FC	2019–20	National Independent Soccer Association	17	1	1	0	0	0	18	1
FAS	2020–21	Salvadoran Primera División	20	0	0	0	0	0	20	0
FAS	2021–22	Salvadoran Primera División	23	0	0	0	2 (Note: Appearances in CONCACAF League)	0	25	0
FAS	Total									
Águila	2022–23	Salvadoran Primera División	14	0	0	0	0	0	14	0
All Boys	2023	Argentine Primera Nacional	13	0	0	0	0	0	13	0
Águila	2023–24	Salvadoran Primera División	11	0	0	0	0	0	11	0
Career total										

== Honours ==
FAS

- Salvadoran Primera División: Clausura 2021
