= Neill Collins =

Scottish football player and manager (born 1983)

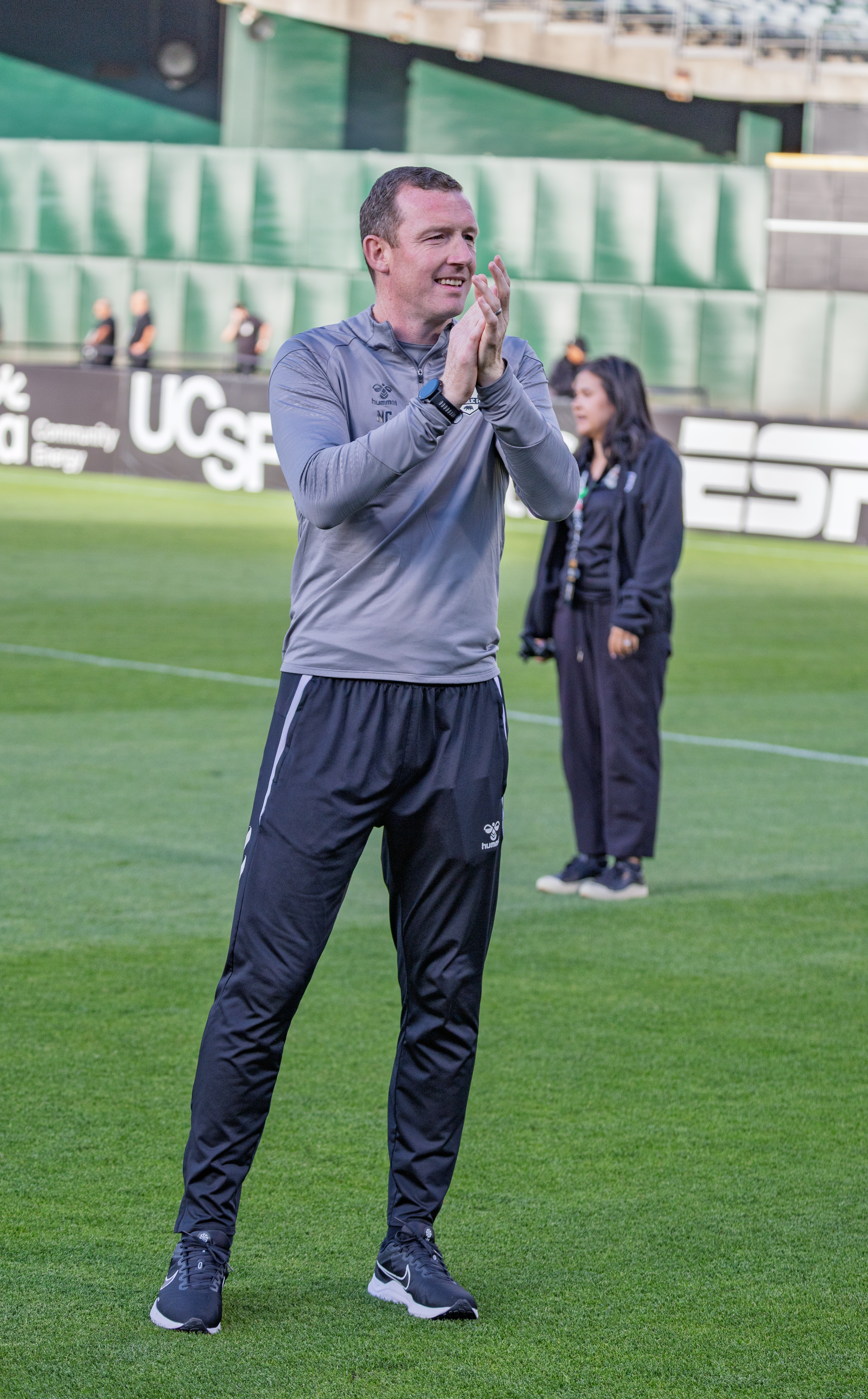
- Collins in 2026

Personal information
- Full name: Neill William Collins
- Date of birth: 2 September 1983 (age 43)
- Place of birth: Troon, Scotland
- Height: 6 ft 3 in (1.91 m)
- Position: Centre-back

Team information
- Current team: Sacramento Republic (manager)

Youth career
- Kilmarnock

Senior career*
Years	Team	Apps	(Gls)
2001–2002	Queen's Park	32	(0)
2002–2004	Dumbarton	63	(4)
2004–2007	Sunderland	18	(1)
2005–2006	→ Hartlepool United (loan)	22	(0)
2006	→ Sheffield United (loan)	2	(0)
2006–2007	→ Wolverhampton Wanderers (loan)	3	(1)
2007–2009	Wolverhampton Wanderers	81	(8)
2009–2010	→ Preston North End (loan)	16	(0)
2010	Preston North End	5	(1)
2010	→ Leeds United (loan)	9	(0)
2010–2011	Leeds United	21	(0)
2011–2016	Sheffield United	177	(12)
2015	→ Port Vale (loan)	7	(0)
2016–2018	Tampa Bay Rowdies	61	(3)
Total		517	(30)

International career
2005	Scotland U21	7	(0)
2007	Scotland B	1	(0)

Managerial career
- 2018–2023: Tampa Bay Rowdies
- 2023–2024: Barnsley
- 2024: Raith Rovers
- 2025–: Sacramento Republic
- * Club domestic league appearances and goals

Neill William Collins (born 2 September 1983) is a Scottish football manager and former player who is the head coach of USL Championship club Sacramento Republic.

Collins is a former Scotland U21 and Scotland B international who played as a centre-back. He started his playing career with Queen's Park before moving to Dumbarton. A transfer to English side Sunderland followed in 2004, but he failed to establish himself in the first team during his three-year spell on Wearside. After loan moves to Hartlepool United and Sheffield United, he was loaned to Wolverhampton Wanderers, where he became a first-team regular and signed a permanent deal in 2007. Following Wolves' promotion to the Premier League, he fell out of favour and moved on loan again, this time to Preston North End. Still, although they signed him permanently in 2010, he was never a regular. He quickly moved to Leeds United, with whom he won promotion to the Championship in 2010. After losing his place the following season, Collins returned to Sheffield United, one of his former loan clubs, where he made over 100 appearances. He lost his first-team place in the 2014–15 season and joined Port Vale on loan in March 2015. He moved to America in March 2016 to play for the Tampa Bay Rowdies. By the end of his 18-year playing career, he had scored 35 goals in 583 league and cup appearances.

He took his first post in management in May 2018 when he transitioned from player to head coach at the Tampa Bay Rowdies. The 2021 season would prove highly successful as he won two USL Championship Coach of the Month awards, as well as the Coach of the Year award, as his side won the Eastern Conference and went on to finish as runners-up in the playoffs. He returned to England as the head coach of Barnsley in July 2023 and was sacked with one game left to play of the 2023–24 season with his team in the League One play-off places. He was appointed as the head coach of Raith Rovers in September 2024.

== Club career ==
=== Queen's Park ===
Collins was born in Troon, Scotland. He was associated with Kilmarnock's youth academy, the team he supported as a boy before being released at the age of 14. He began his career with Scottish amateur club, Queen's Park, making his first-team debut in a 2–0 win at Stirling Albion on 24 March 2001. He went on to make four appearances in the 2000–01 season as John McCormack's Spiders were relegated from the Second Division to the Third Division. He played 31 games as Queen's Park finished bottom of the Scottish Football League in 2001–02. During this time he worked at a Safeway supermarket.

=== Dumbarton ===
Collins earned a move to newly-promoted Second Division club Dumbarton in July 2002. During his stay at the Strathclyde Homes Stadium, Collins became popular with the fans and had a spell as captain and was key to Paul Martin's Sons battle to stay in the Second Division in 2002–03. He then featured 34 times as Dumbarton finished two points outside the promotion places in 2003–04 under Brian Fairley's stewardship. During his time there he had trials with Falkirk, Hibernian, Rangers and Charlton Athletic. During his time in Scotland he also completed a BA 'Sport in the Community' degree at the University of Strathclyde.

=== Sunderland ===
Collins was signed by Sunderland manager Mick McCarthy in August 2004 for a fee of £25,000. Three months later he signed a new contract to keep him at the Stadium of Light until 2007. He made 11 appearances during the 2004–05 season as the club won promotion to the Premier League as champions of the Championship.

He never appeared in the top-flight for the Black Cats after Alan Stubbs was signed and was instead loaned out to League One side Hartlepool United in August 2005. He made 25 appearances for Martin Scott's Pools during his stay at Victoria Park. He was loaned out to Neil Warnock's Championship promotion hopefuls Sheffield United in February 2006. The Blades succeeded in winning promotion in 2005–06, though Collins featured in just two games at Bramall Lane.

With Sunderland back in the Championship in 2006–07, Collins was forced to play in the unfamiliar role of right-back after injuries to teammates Stephen Wright and Nyron Nosworthy. He was a regular under Mick McCarthy, but when McCarthy left the job, Collins was dropped by replacement manager Roy Keane despite Collins feeling he'd performed well.

=== Wolves ===
Collins was reunited with his former boss Mick McCarthy at Wolverhampton Wanderers after joining the club on loan in November 2006. The discussion of his loan deal was the first time that Roy Keane and McCarthy had spoken to each other since the Saipan incident in 2002. After his loan expired, he joined Wolves permanently in January 2007 for a fee of £150,000. He was a regular starter for the rest of the 2006–07 season as the club reached the Championship play-offs.

The 2007–08 season saw Wolves miss out on the play-offs on goal difference with Collins making 42 appearances. Collins started 2008–09 strongly with Wolves but was left out of the first-team with the loan arrival of Michael Mancienne from Chelsea. When Mancienne returned to Chelsea in the New Year, Collins returned to the side, partnering Richard Stearman. He contributed several important goals during this period. Still, he was soon ousted from the side again after receiving a red card for dissent at Reading and following the addition of Scottish international Christophe Berra. He remained out of the side for the remainder of the season as the club were promoted to the Premier League as champions and was transfer listed in July 2009.

=== Preston North End ===
In September 2009, Collins was loaned out to Championship side Preston North End, a move made permanent when he signed a three-and-a-half-year deal for an undisclosed fee in January 2010. The deal was finalised after manager Alan Irvine left the club. The defender lost his place in the side under new manager Darren Ferguson.

=== Leeds United ===
In March 2010, Collins moved to League One side Leeds United on loan for the rest of the 2009–10 season as a replacement for the injured Patrick Kisnorbo. He played an instrumental part as Leeds were promoted to the Championship after finishing in second place in League One. He signed a three-year deal with Leeds in July 2010 for an undisclosed fee.

He started the 2010–11 season as one of Leeds' first-choice defenders due to Patrick Kisnorbo still being out with a long-term injury. After some indifferent performances early on in the season, Collins scored an own goal in Leeds' 5–2 defeat by Barnsley and was dropped to the bench by manager Simon Grayson at the end of October.

=== Sheffield United ===
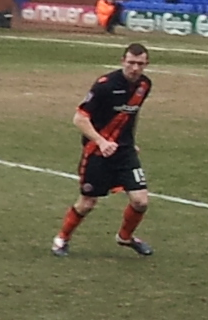
Collins playing for Sheffield United in 2013

Collins signed a two-and-a-half-year deal with Championship side Sheffield United after being signed by Micky Adams for an undisclosed fee in January 2011. He made his debut in a 3–0 defeat to Ipswich Town at Portman Road on 5 February. He was a regular in defence for the remainder of the 2010–11 season, playing 14 games, but struggled as the team undertook an ultimately unsuccessful battle against relegation; he later said that "ill discipline was rife at the club on and off the pitch" and "I tried to be like Roy of the Rovers and Terry Butcher rolled into one and it didn't go well".

Now in League One and under the stewardship of Danny Wilson, the 2011–12 campaign saw Collins establish an effective defensive partnership with fellow centre-back Harry Maguire, and he was awarded supporters Player of the Month for September 2011. He scored his first goal for the Blades in February 2012, in a 1–0 victory over Yorkshire rivals Huddersfield Town at the Galpharm Stadium. Collins remained a mainstay of the defence but United missed out on automatic promotion by three points to city rivals Sheffield Wednesday, then lost to Huddersfield in the play-off final at Wembley Stadium; the match ended in a 0–0 draw, and though Collins converted his penalty his team lost the shoot-out 8–7.

With the club still in League One, Collins remained as first-choice in central defence alongside Maguire, captaining the side during Michael Doyle's absence. During the first half of the 2012–13 season, Collins began to score regularly, netting five times by the start of December as United challenged for automatic promotion. In November, he extended his current contract by two more years until 2015, with the option of another year. His good form was halted when he fractured his cheekbone during a game against Scunthorpe United at the end of December, an injury that ruled him out of action for two months. He made 45 appearances across the campaign as United recorded a club record 21 clean sheets; however, they could only reach the play-off semi-finals.

He scored two goals in 55 appearances in the 2013–14 season and was named on the Football League Team of the Week after helping United to consecutive 1–0 victories away at Colchester United and Milton Keynes Dons as part of a total run of 450 minutes of League One football that the team went without conceding a goal.

He lost his place in the United first-team early in the 2014–15 season and dropped out of manager Nigel Clough's first-team plans, having failed to make an appearance past October. Despite this he vowed to remain at the club, saying he enjoyed a connection with the club. He joined League One rivals Port Vale on loan until the end of the season on 26 March 2015. Manager Rob Page signed him on transfer deadline day and Collins later said that "I had a difficult start... but I grew into the season, we stayed up and I really enjoyed it".

Following Nigel Clough's departure as manager, Collins was restored to the first-team under new boss Nigel Adkins for the 2015–16 season. He was named in the Football League Team of the Week after scoring a headed goal in a 2–0 victory at Swindon Town, winning praise for his centre-back partnership with David Edgar.

=== Tampa Bay Rowdies ===
On 11 March 2016, Collins had his contract with Sheffield United cancelled by mutual consent to allow him to sign a two-year contract with the North American Soccer League's Tampa Bay Rowdies. Head coach Stuart Campbell led the Rowdies to a ninth-place finish in the combined 2016 table. He featured 33 times in the 2017 campaign as the Rowdies finished third in the United Soccer League.

== International career ==
Collins won seven caps at Scotland under-21 level. On 20 November 2007, he played for Scotland B in a 1–1 draw with Republic of Ireland B at the Excelsior Stadium; he came on as a substitute for Darren Dods at half-time.

== Coaching career ==
=== Tampa Bay Rowdies ===
On 18 May 2018, Collins was promoted to manager at the Tampa Bay Rowdies after he impressed chairman Bill Edwards with his intensity and work ethic. The Rowdies went on to finish the 2018 season 12th in the USL Eastern Conference table under difficult circumstances, with Collins commenting that "We had players retiring for a variety of reasons, guys getting serious injuries, other off-field problems, it was one thing after another." They finished fifth in the 2019 season, before losing 2–1 to Louisville City FC in the Conference quarter-finals. The Rowdies finished top of the table in the 2020 season, which was brought to an early end and decided on points per game due to the COVID-19 pandemic in the United States. The play-offs continued and Tampa made it to the Championship final against Phoenix Rising FC. However, the final was cancelled the day before it was due to be played because several Tampa Bay Rowdies players and staff tested positive for COVID-19; the championship would not be awarded.

Collins was named USL Championship Coach of the Year after his team achieved 23 wins to top the Eastern Conference in the 2021 regular season. He was also named as Coach of the Month for April / May and September, having achieved 100% win records in both periods and setting a league record of 891 minutes without conceding a goal. In the playoffs, Tampa defeated FC Tulsa, Birmingham Legion FC and Louisville City FC, before falling to a 3–1 defeat to Orange County SC in the final.

He was named as Coach of the Month for July 2022 after overseeing five wins that extended the club's unbeaten run to 13 games; he credited the run to his players, name-checking new signing Jake LaCava. The Rowdies qualified for the play-offs with a third-place finish in the 2022 Eastern Conference standings; they went on to lose the Conference final game with a 1–0 loss to Louisville City FC.

=== Barnsley ===
On 6 July 2023, Collins returned to England when he was appointed head coach of League One club Barnsley on a two-year deal. He oversaw a 7–0 victory over Port Vale in his first game in charge, the biggest opening day defeat for any team in the EFL since the 1962–63 season over 60 years ago. His side maintained a top six position from 3 October until his departure. On 22 April 2024, Collins was sacked following a disappointing run of form with Barnsley in the play-off places in fifth position with one match remaining of the 2023–24 season.

=== Raith Rovers ===
On 3 September 2024, Collins signed a three-year contract to become head coach of Scottish Championship side Raith Rovers, replacing Ian Murray.

=== Sacramento Republic ===
On 21 December 2024, Collins left Raith Rovers to take charge of Sacramento Republic FC in the USL Championship. His team reached the USL Championship playoffs in the 2025 season, losing to Orange County SC on penalties.

== Style of play ==
Writing in The Guardian in 2007, Steve Claridge compared Collins to Tony Adams, describing him as "strong and robust" with good positional and organisation skills. Collins described heading as the strongest part of his game.

== Career statistics ==
=== Playing statistics ===
Appearances and goals by club, season and competition
Club	Season	League			National cup (Note: Includes Scottish Cup, FA Cup, U.S. Open Cup)		League cup (Note: Includes Scottish League Cup, Football League Cup)		Other		Total	
Club	Season	Division	Apps	Goals	Apps	Goals	Apps	Goals	Apps	Goals	Apps	Goals
Queen's Park	2000–01	Scottish Second Division	4	0	—		—		—		4	0
Queen's Park	2001–02	Scottish Third Division	28	0	2	0	1	0	0	0	31	0
Queen's Park	Total		32	0	2	0	1	0	0	0	35	0
Dumbarton	2002–03	Scottish Second Division	33	2	1	0	1	0	3 (Note: Appearance(s) in Scottish Challenge Cup)	0	38	2
Dumbarton	2003–04	Scottish Second Division	30	2	1	0	2	0	1	0	34	2
Dumbarton	Total		63	4	2	0	3	0	4	0	72	4
Sunderland	2004–05	Championship	11	0	2	0	1	0	—		14	0
Sunderland	2005–06	Premier League	0	0	2	1	—		—		2	1
Sunderland	2006–07	Championship	7	1	—		1	0	—		8	1
Sunderland	Total		18	1	4	1	2	0	—		24	2
Hartlepool United (loan)	2005–06	League One	22	0	0	0	2	0	1 (Note: Appearance(s) in Football League Trophy)	0	25	0
Sheffield United (loan)	2005–06	Championship	2	0	—		—		—		2	0
Wolverhampton Wanderers	2006–07	Championship	22	2	3	0	—		2 (Note: Appearance(s) in play-offs)	0	27	2
Wolverhampton Wanderers	2007–08	Championship	39	3	2	1	1	0	—		42	4
Wolverhampton Wanderers	2008–09	Championship	23	4	2	0	2	0	—		27	4
Wolverhampton Wanderers	2009–10	Premier League	0	0	—		1	0	—		1	0
Wolverhampton Wanderers	Total		84	9	7	1	4	0	2	0	97	10
Preston North End	2009–10	Championship	21	1	1	0	0	0	—		22	1
Leeds United	2009–10	League One	9	0	—		—		—		9	0
Leeds United	2010–11	Championship	21	0	0	0	2	0	—		23	0
Leeds United	Total		30	0	0	0	2	0	—		32	0
Sheffield United	2010–11	Championship	14	0	—		—		—		14	0
Sheffield United	2011–12	League One	42	2	4	0	2	0	6 (Note: 3 appearances in Football League Trophy and 3 appearances in the play-offs.)	0	54	2
Sheffield United	2012–13	League One	39	4	3	0	1	1	2	0	45	5
Sheffield United	2013–14	League One	44	2	8	0	1	0	2	0	55	2
Sheffield United	2014–15	League One	8	1	0	0	3	0	1	0	12	1
Sheffield United	2015–16	League One	30	3	3	0	1	1	0	0	34	4
Sheffield United	Total		177	12	18	0	8	2	11	0	214	14
Port Vale (loan)	2014–15	League One	7	0	—		—		—		7	0
Tampa Bay Rowdies	2016	NASL	22	1	2	0	—		—		24	1
Tampa Bay Rowdies	2017	USL	30	2	1	0	—		2 (Note: Appearances in USL Cup playoffs)	0	33	2
Tampa Bay Rowdies	2018	USL	9	0	1	0	—		—		10	0
Tampa Bay Rowdies	Total		61	3	4	0	0	0	2	0	67	3
Career total			515	30	38	2	22	2	20	0	595	34

=== Managerial statistics ===
As of match played 28 June 2025

Managerial record by team and tenure
Team	From	To	Record					Ref.
Team	From	To	P	W	D	L	Win %	Ref.
Barnsley	9 July 2023	22 April 2024	52	24	14	14	46.2	
Raith Rovers	3 September 2024	21 December 2024	15	6	3	6	40.0	

== Honours ==
=== Player ===
Sunderland

- Football League Championship: 2004–05

Wolverhampton Wanderers

- Football League Championship: 2008–09

Leeds United

- Football League One second-place promotion: 2009–10

=== Manager ===
Individual

- USL Championship Coach of the Month: April / May 2021, September 2021, July 2022
- USL Championship Coach of the Year: 2021

Tampa Bay Rowdies

- USL Championship
  - finalist: 2020 (Note: Championship game canceled due to COVID-19 outbreak in the Rowdies camp.)
  - Regular Season Division Champion: 2020, 2021
  - Eastern Conference Champion: 2020, 2021
  - Regular Season Champion: 2021
  - Playoff runner-up: 2021
- Coastal Cup: 2021
