= 2021 Tampa Bay Rowdies season =

Tampa Bay Rowdies
2021 season
- Chairman: Stuart Sternberg
- Head coach: Neill Collins
- Stadium: Al Lang Stadium
- USL Championship: 1st, Eastern Conference; Regular Season Winners
- USL Cup: Runners-up
- U.S. Open Cup: Cancelled
- Top goalscorer: League: Guenzatti (21); All: Guenzatti (22)
- Highest home attendance: League: 6,882; All: 7,521
- Lowest home attendance: League: 1,870; All: 1,870
- Average home league attendance: 3,753
- Biggest win: 6–0 (May 1 vs NYRB)
- Biggest defeat: 2–0 (July 31 @ CHAR)
Home colors	Away colors	Third colors

The 2021 Tampa Bay Rowdies season was the club's twelfth season of existence, their fifth in the United Soccer League, and third in the USL Championship. Including the previous Tampa Bay Rowdies, this is the 28th season of a franchise in the Tampa Bay metro area with the Rowdies moniker. Including the now-defunct Tampa Bay Mutiny, this is the 34th season of professional soccer in the Tampa Bay region.

== Club ==
=== Roster ===
As of June 3, 2021

Squad No.	Name	Nationality	Position(s)	Since	Date of birth (age)	Signed from	Games played (Note: Regular season only)	Goals scored
Goalkeepers
1	Evan Louro	(United States)	GK	2020	19 January 1996 (age 30)	New York Red Bulls	16	0
25	Ian McGrane	(United States)	GK	2020	22 November 1995 (age 30)	Stumptown Athletic	0	0
56	Raiko Arozarena	(Cuba)	GK	2021	27 March 1997 (age 29)	Cafetaleros de Chiapas	0	0
Defenders
2	Conner Antley	(United States)	RB/DF	2021	22 March 1995 (age 31)	Indy Eleven	0	0
3	Forrest Lasso	(United States)	CB	2020	11 May 1993 (age 33)	FC Cincinnati	16	3
5	Jordan Scarlett	(Jamaica)	CB	2020	8 July 1995 (age 31)	New York Red Bulls II	16	1
16	Max Lachowecki	(United States)	LB	2020	30 June 1992 (age 34)	Free Agent	24	0
33	Aarón Guillén	(Mexico)	CB	2020	23 June 1993 (age 33)	North Carolina FC	16	0
Midfielders
4	Lewis Hilton	(England)	CM	2020	22 October 1993 (age 33)	Saint Louis FC	16	0
7	Yann Ekra	(France)	CM	2019	12 October 1990 (age 36)	Charlotte Independence	31	1
8	Zach Steinberger	(United States)	AM	2019	10 May 1992 (age 34)	Indy Eleven	29	3
11	Leo Fernandes	(Brazil)	LM	2017	23 December 1991 (age 34)	Philadelphia Union	82	11
21	Dayonn Harris	(Canada)	RW	2021	29 August 1997 (age 29)	Real Monarchs SLC	0	0
22	Jordan Doherty	(Republic of Ireland)	DM	2019	29 August 2000 (age 26)	Sheffield United FC Academy	38	2
23	Sebastian Dalgaard	(Denmark)	WM	2020	23 August 1991 (age 35)	Hartford Athletic	13	0
27	Laurence Wyke	(England)	DM	2021	20 September 1996 (age 30)	Atlanta United FC	0	0
29	Matthew Srbely	(Canada)	AM	2021	29 November 1998 (age 27)	Toronto FC II	0	0
97	Luiz Fernando	(Brazil)	WM	2021	23 June 1997 (age 29)	Atlanta United FC	0	0
Forwards
9	Juan Tejada	(Panama)	CF	2019	14 January 1997 (age 29)	Lakeland Tropics	42	12
10	Steevan Dos Santos	(Cape Verde)	CF	2021	17 September 1989 (age 37)	Pittsburgh Riverhounds SC	0	0
13	Sebastián Guenzatti	(Uruguay)	CF	2017	8 July 1991 (age 35)	New York Cosmos	82	32
14	Foster Langsdorf	(United States)	CF	2021	14 December 1995 (age 30)	Loan from Minnesota United FC	0	0
17	Jordan Adebayo-Smith	(United States)	CF	2021	11 January 2001 (age 25)	Sutton United FC	0	0
77	Lucky Mkosana	(Zimbabwe)	CF	2019	30 September 1987 (age 39)	Louisville City FC	62	12

=== Team management and staff ===
Front Office
Owner	(United States) Stuart Sternberg
President & C.O.O.	(United States) Lee Cohen
Vice chairman	(United States) Matthew Silverman
Vice chairman	(United States) Brian Auld
Technical staff
Head coach/Technical director	(Scotland) Neill Collins
Assistant coach	(England) Stuart Dobson
Assistant coach	(Republic of Ireland) Kevin Foley
Assistant coach	(United States) Chad Burt
Performance coach	(United States) Pete Calabrese
Chief scout	(United States) Eric Rudland
Medical staff
Head athletic trainer	(United States) Andrew Keane
Assistant athletic trainer	(United States) Michelle Leget
Orthopedic surgeon	(United States) Dr. Mohit Bansal
Primary care physician	(United States) Dr. Mathew Vermeer

== Competitions ==
=== Exhibitions ===
The Rowdies initial preseason schedule was announced on March 10, 2021.

March 20, 2021 Preseason	Tampa Bay Rowdies	2–1	South Georgia Tormenta FC	St. Petersburg, FL
	Guenzatti 30' (Adebayo-Smith); Adbayo-Smith 34'; Trialist (yellow card) 90'	Report	Micaletto 38'	Stadium: Al Lang Stadium; Attendance: closed-door

March 27, 2021 Preseason	Tampa Bay Rowdies	1–0	Inter Miami CF	St. Petersburg, FL
	Wyke 81'			Stadium: Al Lang Stadium; Attendance: closed-door

March 31, 2021 Preseason	Tampa Bay Rowdies	0–1	Nashville SC	Bradenton, FL
	Aguirre (yellow card) 68'	Report	22'; McCarty (yellow card) 33'	Stadium: IMG Academy; Attendance: closed-door

April 3, 2021 Preseason	Tampa Bay Rowdies	1–3	New York Red Bulls	Bradenton, FL
		Report		Stadium: IMG Academy

April 11, 2021 Preseason	Tampa Bay Rowdies	1–5	CF Montréal	St. Petersburg, FL
	Dos Santos 89' (Hilton)		Mihailovic 10' (Toye); Toye 12' (Quioto), 40'; Scarlett 45' (o.g.); Sejdič 64'; (red card) 73'	Stadium: Al Lang Stadium

April 17, 2021 Preseason	Tampa Bay Rowdies	5–0	Naples United FC	St. Petersburg, FL
	Harris 31'; Wyke 50', (yellow card) 61'; Dos Santos 63' (pen.); Adebayo-Smith 74'; Steinberger 84' (Fernandes)	Report	#25 (yellow card) 42' #5 (yellow card) 45'	Stadium: Al Lang Stadium

April 24, 2021 Preseason	Tampa Spartans	1–3	Tampa Bay Rowdies	Tampa, FL
19:00 EDT (UTC−5)	Foster (34:27); Youth (yellow card) 68:37'	Report	Fernandes (20:44); Guenzatti (30:14); Dos Santos (51:46); Antley (yellow card) 54:45'; Lachowecki (yellow card) 56:18'; Scarlett (yellow card) 89:13'	Stadium: Pepin Stadium; Attendance: 0

=== USL Championship ===
==== Standings — Atlantic Division ====
Pos	Team	Pld	W	L	T	GF	GA	GD	Pts	Qualification
1	Tampa Bay Rowdies	32	23	7	2	55	23	+32	71	Advance to USL Championship Playoffs
2	Charlotte Independence	32	18	9	5	57	36	+21	59	Advance to USL Championship Playoffs
3	Pittsburgh Riverhounds SC	32	17	8	7	52	34	+18	58 (Note: The USL decided to replay the sides' October 16 match from the 67th minute after the referee wrongly disallowed a Pittsburgh Riverhounds SC goal. The original score was 0–0.)	Advance to USL Championship Playoffs
4	Miami FC	32	16	10	6	55	40	+15	54	Advance to USL Championship Playoffs
5	Hartford Athletic	32	12	15	5	50	50	0	41	
6	Charleston Battery	32	10	15	7	49	60	−11	37	
7	New York Red Bulls II	32	7	18	7	42	67	−25	28	
8	Loudoun United FC	32	4	25	3	31	78	−47	15	

Source: USL

==== Results summary ====
Overall								Home						Away					
Pld	W	D	L	GF	GA	GD	Pts	W	D	L	GF	GA	GD	W	D	L	GF	GA	GD
32	23	2	7	55	23	+32	71	14	1	2	39	10	+29	9	1	5	16	13	+3

Last updated: 19 September 2021.
Source: Match reports

==== Results by round ====
Round	1	2	3	4	5	6	7	8	9	10	11	12	13	14	15	16	17	18	19	20	21	22	23	24	25	26	27	28	29	30	31	32
Stadium	H	H	H	H	A	A	H	H	A	H	A	H	A	H	A	A	H	A	A	H	H	A	H	A	A	A	H	A	H	H	A	A
Result	W	W	W	W	W	L	W	L	W	W	L	L	L	W	L	W	W	D	W	W	W	W	W	W	W	W	W	L	D	W	W	W
Position	1	1	1	1	1	1	1	1	1	1	1	1	1	1	2	2	1	1	1	1	1	1	1	1	1	1	1	1	1	1	1	1

Updated to match(es) played on 19 September 2021. Source: Match reports
A = Away; H = Home; W = Win; D = Draw; L = Loss

==== Results ====
May 1, 2021 1	Tampa Bay Rowdies	3–0	Charlotte Independence	St. Petersburg, FL
19:30 EDT (UTC−5)	Steinberger (yellow card) 35'; Dalgaard (yellow card) 54'; Guenzatti 54' (pen.), 77' (Lasso); Fernandes 79' (Guenzatti)	Report	Areman (yellow card) 35'; Roberts (yellow card) 84'	Stadium: Al Lang Stadium; Attendance: 1,870; Referee: Tori Penso

May 8, 2021 2	Tampa Bay Rowdies	3–0	Pittsburgh Riverhounds	St. Petersburg, FL
19:30 EDT (UTC−5)	Dos Santos 30' (Fernandes); Guenzatti 75' (pen.); Adebayo-Smith 84'	Report	Griffin (yellow card) 11'; Gatt (yellow card) 76'	Stadium: Al Lang Stadium; Attendance: 1,978; Referee: Elvis Osmanovic

May 15, 2021 3	Tampa Bay Rowdies	2–1	Phoenix Rising	St. Petersburg, FL
20:00 EDT (UTC−5)	Quinn 4' (o.g.); Hilton (yellow card) 40'; Dos Santos 61'; Louro (yellow card) 68'; Adebayo-Smith (yellow card) 90+2'	Report	Quinn (yellow card) 42'; Moar 68' (Dadashov); Dadashov (yellow card) 68'; Adewole (yellow card) 80'; Saydee (yellow card) 86'; Billingsley (yellow card) 90'	Stadium: Al Lang Stadium; Attendance: 2,355; Referee: Ismir Pekmic

May 22, 2021 4	Tampa Bay Rowdies	2–1	Miami FC	St. Petersburg, FL
19:30 EDT (UTC−5)	Dos Santos 12' (Hilton); Hilton (yellow card) 65'; Guenzatti 79' (pen.)	Report	Palacios (yellow card) 17'; Forbes 38'; Akinyode (yellow card) 74'; Craig (yellow card) 84'	Stadium: Al Lang Stadium; Attendance: 2,518; Referee: Gabriele Giusti

June 2, 2021 5	New York Red Bulls II	0–1	Tampa Bay Rowdies	Montclair, NJ
19:00 EDT (UTC−5)	Zalinsky (yellow card) 60'; Tombul (yellow card) 79'; Edelman (yellow card) 84'	Report	Adebayo-Smith 32' (Doherty), (yellow card) 51'; Guenzatti (yellow card) 33'; Scarlett (yellow card) 41'; Langsdorf (yellow card) 90+4'	Stadium: MSU Soccer Park at Pittser Field; Attendance: 543; Referee: Luis Arroyo

June 5, 2021 6	Charlotte Independence	1–0	Tampa Bay Rowdies	Charlotte, NC
19:00 EDT (UTC−5)	Dean (yellow card) 14'; Etou 25' (pen.); Miller (yellow card) 62'; Bender (yellow card) 86'	Report	Langsdorf (yellow card) 64'; Adebayo-Smith (yellow card) 68'	Stadium: American Legion Memorial Stadium; Attendance: 2,380; Referee: Greg Dopka

June 11, 2021 7	Tampa Bay Rowdies	2–1	Loudoun United	St. Petersburg, FL
19:30 EDT (UTC−5)	Antley (yellow card) 13'; Guenzatti 34' (Antley); Wyke (yellow card) 79'; Langsdorf 85', (yellow card) 86'	Report	Dambrot 4' (Paz), (yellow card) 23'; Bolívar (yellow card) 74'	Stadium: Al Lang Stadium; Attendance: 4,332; Referee: Jonathan Bilinski

June 19, 2021 8	Tampa Bay Rowdies	1–2	Pittsburgh Riverhounds	St. Petersburg, FL
19:30 EDT (UTC−5)	Hilton (yellow card) 41'; Lasso (yellow card) 45+3'; Ekra (yellow card) 61'; Guenzatti 90+2' (Harris)	Report	Griffin 21' (Cicerone); Williams (yellow card) 40'; Cicerone 55' (Forbes)	Stadium: Al Lang Stadium; Attendance: 4,672; Referee: Sergii Demianchuk

June 26, 2021 9	Hartford Athletic	0–1	Tampa Bay Rowdies	Hartford, CT
19:00 EDT (UTC−5)	Lara (yellow card) 58'	Report	Guenzatti 33'; Fernandes (yellow card) 79'	Stadium: Dillon Stadium; Attendance: 4,966; Referee: Joshua Encarnación

July 2, 2021 10	Tampa Bay Rowdies	1–0	Charleston Battery	St. Petersburg, FL
19:30 EDT (UTC−5)	Scarlett (yellow card) 31'; Guenzatti 68' (pen.)	Report	Di Rosa (yellow card) 44'; Archer (yellow card) 67'; Crawford (yellow card) 90+1'	Stadium: Al Lang Stadium; Attendance: 4,326; Referee: Kyle Johnston

July 7, 2021 11	Miami FC	2–1	Tampa Bay Rowdies	Miami, FL
19:30 EDT (UTC−5)	Reid 21' (da Silva); Chapman-Page (yellow card) 39', (goal) 77' (François) da Silva (yellow card) 90+3'	Report	Lasso (yellow card) 23'; Scarlett 51' (Hilton)	Stadium: Riccardo Silva Stadium; Referee: Thomas Snyder

July 13, 2021 12	Tampa Bay Rowdies	0–1	Hartford Athletic	St. Petersburg, FL
19:30 EDT (UTC−5)	Scarlett (yellow card) 58'; Fernandes (yellow card) 64'	Report	Dodson 23' (Preston); Elney (yellow card) 34'; Ashitey (yellow card) 37'; Boudadi (yellow card) 52'; Gómez (yellow card) 56'	Stadium: Al Lang Stadium; Attendance: 2,943; Referee: Kevin Broadley

July 17, 2021 13	Miami FC	2–1	Tampa Bay Rowdies	Miami, FL
19:30 EDT (UTC−5)	Martínez 10'; Bah 34' (da Silva); Reid (yellow card) 90'	Report	Steinberger (yellow card) 28'; Guillén (yellow card) 36'; Dalgaard (yellow card) 60'; Fernandes 65' (Dalgaard)	Stadium: Riccardo Silva Stadium; Referee: Elvis Osmanovic

July 24, 2021 14	Tampa Bay Rowdies	3–1	Loudoun United	St. Petersburg, FL
19:30 EDT (UTC−5)	Guillén 7' (Dalgaard); Fernandes (yellow card) 21', (goal) 52' (Hilton); Lasso (yellow card) 37'; Ekra (yellow card) 73'; Guenzatti 74' (Ekra)	Report	Smith (yellow card) 34'; Downs 70' (Sorga)	Stadium: Al Lang Stadium; Attendance: 4,920; Referee: Sergii Demianchuk

July 31, 2021 15	Charlotte Independence	2–0	Tampa Bay Rowdies	Charlotte, NC
19:00 EDT (UTC−5)	Kelly 47' (Martínez), (yellow card) 48'; Parra 62' (Riascos); Dimick (yellow card) 89'	Report	Antley (yellow card) 22'; Hilton (yellow card) 59'; Doherty (yellow card) 90+5'	Stadium: American Legion Memorial Stadium; Attendance: 2,371; Referee: Jeremy Scheer

August 6, 2021 16	New York Red Bulls II	1–2	Tampa Bay Rowdies	Montclair, NJ
19:00 EDT (UTC−5)	LaCava 9' (Nagoma); Lewis (yellow card) 21'; Sowe (yellow card) 41'; Tombul (yellow card) 45+1'	Report	Adebayo-Smith 33' (Lachowecki); Lachowecki 47' (Wyke); Ekra (yellow card) 83'	Stadium: MSU Soccer Park at Pittser Field; Attendance: 587; Referee: Calin Radosav

August 13, 2021 17	Tampa Bay Rowdies	1–0	Hartford Athletic	St. Petersburg, FL
19:30 EDT (UTC−5)	Adebayo-Smith 85'	Report	Lara (yellow card) 31'; McGlynn (yellow card) 78'	Stadium: Al Lang Stadium; Attendance: 3,682; Referee: Elton Garcia

August 18, 2021 18	Pittsburgh Riverhounds	0–0	Tampa Bay Rowdies	Pittsburgh, PA
18:00 EDT (UTC−5)	Velarde (yellow card) 58'	Report	Lasso (yellow card) 31'; Mkosana (yellow card) 90+3'	Stadium: Highmark Stadium; Referee: Jon Freemon

August 23, 2021 19	Loudoun United	0–2	Tampa Bay Rowdies	Leesburg, VA
19:00 EDT (UTC−5)	Saravia (yellow card) 36'; Landry (yellow card) 64'	Report	Hilton 23'; Lasso 45+3' (Hilton); Wyke (yellow card) 82'; Mkosana (yellow card) 87'	Stadium: Segra Field; Attendance: 360; Referee: Luis Arroyo

August 28, 2021 20	Tampa Bay Rowdies	2–0	Charlotte Independence	St. Petersburg, FL
19:30 EDT (UTC−5)	Hilton (yellow card) 60'; Dos Santos 73', 76' (Wyke)	Report	Bronico (yellow card) 69'	Stadium: Al Lang Stadium; Attendance: 4,461; Referee: Ekaterina Koroleva

September 3, 2021 21	Tampa Bay Rowdies	3–0	Oakland Roots	St. Petersburg, FL
19:30 EDT (UTC−5)	Guillén (yellow card) 19'; Guenzatti 30' (Scarlett); Dalgaard 41' (Wyke); Mkosana 82' (Wyke)	Report	Hernández (yellow card) 85'	Stadium: Al Lang Stadium; Attendance: 3,514; Referee: Gerald Flores

September 7, 2021 22	Charleston Battery	0–1	Tampa Bay Rowdies	Charleston, SC
19:00 EDT (UTC−5)	Paterson (yellow card) 39'; Archer (yellow card) 52' (yellow-red card) 86'; Crawford (yellow card) 87'	Report	Wyke (yellow card) 55'; Hilton 63' (Dos Santos); Antley (red card) 82'	Stadium: Patriots Point Soccer Complex; Attendance: 2,024; Referee: Matthew Thompson

September 11, 2021 23	Tampa Bay Rowdies	6–0	New York Red Bulls II	St. Petersburg, FL
19:30 EDT (UTC−5)	Fernandes 12' (Dalgaard), 39' (Guenzatti); Guenzatti 36' (Ekra), 49' (Ekra); Ekra 58' (Guenzatti), 69'	Report	Knapp (yellow card) 9'; Zajec (yellow card) 80'	Stadium: Al Lang Stadium; Attendance: 4,413; Referee: Brandon Stevis

September 18, 2021 24	Atlanta United 2	0–2	Tampa Bay Rowdies	Kennesaw, GA
19:30 EDT (UTC−5)	Bauer (yellow card) 28'; Ambrose (yellow card) 71'	Report	Guenzatti 2' (Dos Santos), 45+1'; Dalgaard (yellow card) 27'; Scarlett (yellow card) 53'; Wyke (yellow card) 77'	Stadium: Fifth Third Bank Stadium; Attendance: 699; Referee: Melvin Rivas

September 25, 2021 25	Hartford Athletic	1–2	Tampa Bay Rowdies	Hartford, CT
19:00 EDT (UTC−5)	Yacoubou (yellow card) 31'; Haak (yellow card) 52'; McGlynn (yellow card) 63'; Preston (yellow card) 86'; Barrera 90+4' (Dodson)	Report	Guenzatti 12' (Fernandez), 45+2' (Fernandez); Hilton (yellow card) 27'	Stadium: Dillon Stadium; Attendance: 5,138; Referee: Lukasz Szpala

October 2, 2021 26	Charleston Battery	1–2	Tampa Bay Rowdies	Charleston, SC
19:00 EDT (UTC−5)	Repetto 10' (pen.); Zarkostas (yellow card) 13'; Kuzminsky (yellow card) 24'; Archer (yellow card) 24'; Harmon (yellow card) 42'; McCue (yellow card) 67'; Gdula (yellow card) 88'	Report	Scarlett (yellow card) 8'; Lasso (yellow card) 12'; Wyke 21' (Guenzatti); Guenzatti 25' (pen.), (yellow card) 69'	Stadium: Patriots Point Soccer Complex; Attendance: 2,848; Referee: Luis Guardia

October 7, 2021 27	Tampa Bay Rowdies	4–2	Charleston Battery	St. Petersburg, FL
20:00 EDT (UTC−5)	Guenzatti 27' (Antley), 34' (Fernandez), (yellow card) 48'; Fernandez 12' (Antley); Dos Santos 90+3' (Steinberger)	Report	Kelly-Rosales (yellow card) 24'; Scarlett 36' (o.g.); Zarokostas (yellow card) 37'; Bunting 90+3' (Repetto)	Stadium: Al Lang Stadium; Attendance: 3,210; Referee: Adam Kilpatrick

October 10, 2021 28	Pittsburgh Riverhounds	2–0	Tampa Bay Rowdies	Pittsburgh, PA
TBD EDT (UTC−5)	Williamson 42'; Vitiello (yellow card) 56'; Cicerone 74' (pen.); Wiedt (yellow card) 78'	Report	Lasso (yellow card) 59'; Wyke (yellow card) 90'	Stadium: Highmark Stadium; Attendance: 2,727; Referee: Ismir Pekmic

October 15, 2021 29	Tampa Bay Rowdies	1–1	New York Red Bulls II	St. Petersburg, FL
19:30 EDT (UTC−5)	Scarlett (yellow card) 34'; Castillo 45' (o.g.); Lasso (yellow card) 90+1'	Report	Archimède 23' (Sowe); Zajec (yellow card) 45+2'; Rafanello (red card) 90+4'	Stadium: Al Lang Stadium; Attendance: 6,882; Referee: Alyssa Nichols

October 20, 2021 30	Tampa Bay Rowdies	3–0	Miami FC	St. Petersburg, FL
19:30 EDT (UTC−5)	Guenzatti 3' (Fernandez), 71' (Antley); Antley (yellow card) 56'; Dos Santos 76' (Guenzatti)	Report	Kcira (yellow card) 38'; Craig (yellow card) 63'	Stadium: Al Lang Stadium; Attendance: 3,976; Referee: Matthew Thompson

October 23, 2021 31	Loudoun United	0–1	Tampa Bay Rowdies	Leesburg, VA
19:00 EDT (UTC−5)	Houssou (yellow card) 75'; Paz (yellow card) 86'	Report	Dos Santos 40'; Antley (yellow card) 41'; Hilton (yellow card) 71'; Dalgaard (yellow card) 86'	Stadium: Segra Field; Attendance: 917; Referee: Abdou Ndiaye

October 30, 2021 32	Las Vegas Lights	1–2	Tampa Bay Rowdies	Las Vegas, NV
22:00 EDT (UTC−5)	Trejo 24' (Traore); Leone (yellow card) 35'	Report	Dos Santos 12', 61' (Wyke); Wyke (yellow card) 49'	Stadium: Cashman Field; Referee: Mark Allatin

=== USL Championship playoffs ===
==== Bracket ====
Conference Quarter-finals; November 5–7	Conference Semi-finals; November 13
A1	Tampa Bay Rowdies	6
C4	FC Tulsa	2
A1	Tampa Bay Rowdies	1
C2	Birmingham Legion FC	0
C2	Birmingham Legion FC	w/o
A3	Pittsburgh Riverhounds SC
Eastern Conference
A2	Charlotte Independence	3
C3	Memphis 901 FC	1
A2	Charlotte Independence	0
C1	Louisville City FC	1
C1	Louisville City FC	1
A4	Miami FC	0
M1	El Paso Locomotive FC	0
P4	Oakland Roots SC	1
P4	Oakland Roots SC	0(5)
P2	Orange County SC (p)	0(6)
P2	Orange County SC	1
M3	Colorado Springs Switchbacks	0
Western Conference
M2	San Antonio FC	2
P3	San Diego Loyal SC	0
M2	San Antonio FC	3
M4	Rio Grande Valley FC	1
P1	Phoenix Rising FC	3(3)
M4	Rio Grande Valley FC (p)	3(4)

Conference Finals; November 20
A1	Tampa Bay Rowdies (a.e.t.)	3
C1	Louisville City FC	2
P2	Orange County SC (p)	1(5)
M2	San Antonio FC	1(3)

USL Championship Final; November 28
A1	Tampa Bay Rowdies	1
P2	Orange County SC	3

==== Results ====
November 6, 2021 EC Quarterfinal	Tampa Bay Rowdies	6–2	FC Tulsa	St. Petersburg, FL
19:30 EDT (UTC−5)	Guenzatti 21' (Antley); Guillén (yellow card) 45+2'; Kibato 46' (o.g.); Dos Santos 56' (Hilton), (yellow card) 79'; Fernandez 89' (Mkosana), 90+5' (Mkosana); Mkosana 90+2'	Report	Rivas 67' (Jadama); Bird (yellow card) 63' (yellow-red card) 73'; Suárez 90' (Bourgeois)	Stadium: Al Lang Stadium; Attendance: 6,262; Referee: Sergii Demianchuk

November 13, 2021 EC Semifinal	Tampa Bay Rowdies	1–0	Birmingham Legion FC	St. Petersburg, FL
19:00 EST (UTC−5)	Ekra 57' (Antley); Scarlett (yellow card) 90+4'	Report	A. Crognale (yellow card) 39'; Kasim (yellow card) 46'; E. Crognale (yellow card) 89'; Williams (yellow card) 90+3'	Stadium: Al Lang Stadium; Attendance: 5,949; Referee: Elton García

November 20, 2021 EC Final	Tampa Bay Rowdies	3–2 (a.e.t.)	Louisville City FC	St. Petersburg, FL
19:30 EST (UTC−5)	Tejada (yellow card) 43'; Dos Santos (yellow card) 77', (goal) 102' (Wyke); Wyke (yellow card) 83'; Mkosana 83', 90+6' (Lasso); Guillén (yellow card) 98'	Report	Ownby (yellow card) 5', (goal) 10' (Jimenez); Lasso 23' (o.g.); Gómez (yellow card) 55'; Jimenez (yellow card) 100'	Stadium: Al Lang Stadium; Attendance: 7,120; Referee: Lukasz Szpala

November 28, 2021 USL Championship Final	Tampa Bay Rowdies	1–3	Orange County SC	St. Petersburg, FL
20:30 EST (UTC−5)	Lasso (yellow card) 16'; Fernandes 57'	Report	Damus 25', 38'; Kuningas 45'; Mines (yellow card) 90+2'	Stadium: Al Lang Stadium; Attendance: 7,521; Referee: Rubiel Vazquez

=== U.S. Open Cup ===
On March 29, 2021, the Rowdies were confirmed as one of four representatives of the USL Championship to compete in the Open Cup. On July 20, it was announced that the tournament would be cancelled for the second straight year, and would resume in 2022.

TBD Round of 16	Tampa Bay Rowdies (Florida)	cancelled	TBD	TBD
				Stadium: TBD

== Honors ==
- USL Regular Season Champion
- USL Eastern Conference Champion
- USL Atlantic Division Champion

=== Individual honors ===
- Golden Glove

Evan Louro

- Coach of the Year

Neill Collins

- Goalkeeper of the Year

Evan Louro

- Defender of the Year

Forrest Lasso

- USL All-League

Evan Louro
Forrest Lasso
Sebastián Guenzatti
Aarón Guillén (second team)
