= 2006–07 Sunderland A.F.C. season =

English football club season

Sunderland A.F.C.
2006–07 season
- Chairman: Niall Quinn
- Manager: Niall Quinn (until 30 August); Roy Keane (from 28 August)
- Championship: 1st (promoted)
- FA Cup: Third round
- League Cup: First round
- Top goalscorer: League: David Connolly (13); All: David Connolly (13)
- Highest home attendance: 44,448 (v Burnley, 27 April 2007)
- Lowest home attendance: 24,242 (v West Bromwich Albion, 28 August 2006)

The 2006–07 season was the 112th full season in Sunderland A.F.C.'s history and their 106th in the league system of English football. After recording a record low total of 15 points in the 2005–06 season, Sunderland finished bottom of the league and were relegated to the Football League Championship.

== Background ==
Sunderland began the 2005–06 season with Mick McCarthy as manager, having been promoted as champions the previous season. Before the start of the season, McCarthy recruited Daryl Murphy, Nyron Nosworthy, Jonathan Stead, Kelvin Davis, Tommy Miller, Martin Woods, Alan Stubbs, Joe Murphy and Andy Gray. Their first match back in the Premier League came against Charlton Athletic where they were beaten 3–1. Sunderland's first victory of the season came in the Tees-Wear derby, when goals from Tommy Miller and Julio Arca saw them to a 2–0 victory. After this win, they had to wait until January to record their next victory when they beat West Bromwich Albion.

On 6 March 2006, McCarthy was sacked, and former player Kevin Ball was brought in for the final ten games of the season. In a match against Fulham heavy snow forced the game to be abandoned while Sunderland were 1–0 down. The rearranged fixture was won by Sunderland, as they narrowly avoided being the only club in English League football to not win a home game. They finished the season with 15 points, which was a record low in the top flight until Derby County broke it with 11 points in the 2007–08 season. This also broke their own record low number of points, beating the 19 points they achieved in 2002–03.

== Review ==
=== Pre-season ===
Much of the summer had involved rumours of a takeover deal between former player Niall Quinn and a consortium consisting mainly of Irish businessmen. Talks were confirmed between Quinn and the club on 28 April, and a takeover fee of £10,000,000 was later agreed. Just days before the takeover was complete, Quinn himself was appointed manager, with the start of the Championship looming. Quinn and the Drumaville Consortium completed the £10,000,000 takeover for 72.59% of the club's shares on 27 July. The pre-season transfer activity started with five signings for Sunderland and three players being transferred to other clubs. They recruited experienced players Kenny Cunningham, Darren Ward and Robbie Elliott for free transfers. Trevor Carson and Peter Hartley were promoted through the club's youth system. Sunderland allowed Kelvin Davis to join Southampton for £1,250,000, and former fan favourite Julio Arca left to join rivals Middlesbrough.

As Kevin Ball returned into his coaching role at the club, Kevin Richardson took charge of pre-season affairs. Their first pre-season match was against non-league Forest Green Rovers, which Sunderland won 3–0 with goals from Liam Lawrence, Daryl Murphy and Dean Whitehead. This was followed up by a 2–0 win against Rotherham United; Daryl Murphy and Jonathan Stead were the scorers. Murphy continued his pre-season scoring streak with a goal against Irish outfit Shelbourne; Rory Delap scored the other goal in a 2–0 victory. Sunderland finished their pre-season schedule with a 3–0 win over Carlisle United. Jonathan Stead, Liam Lawrence and Grant Leadbitter were the scorers, giving Sunderland an unbeaten pre-season record scoring ten goals, and not conceding any goals.

=== August ===
Sunderland's season started against Coventry City on 6 August 2006. They had taken the lead with a goal from Daryl Murphy, but ended up losing the match 2–1. On 8 August, Sunderland signed Clive Clarke from West Ham United for £400,000. Captain George McCartney went the opposite way for £1,000,000 after eight seasons at Sunderland. Sunderland's next game was against Birmingham City on 9 August; they lost the game 1–0. They further bolstered their squad with the signing of Barcelona B player Arnau Riera for a free transfer. Sunderland continued their poor start to the season with a defeat against Plymouth Argyle on 12 August. They initially led the match after a Daryl Murphy goal, but finished up 3–2 losers; Stephen Elliott was the other scorer for Sunderland. They recorded their fourth defeat in as many games against Southend United on 19 August, being beaten 3–1. Jonathan Stead grabbed a consolation goal late on, but Sunderland went to the bottom of the league. On 22 August Sunderland began their League Cup campaign against Bury who were bottom of the Football League; they were beaten 2–0. Arnau Riera was sent off after making his first start for the club. Quinn secured the signings of William Mocquet from Le Havre for an undisclosed fee, and Tobias Hysén from Djurgården for £1,700,000. He also allowed Kevin Kyle to join Coventry City for £600,000.

With prospective manager Roy Keane watching in the crowd, Sunderland and Quinn achieved their first victories of the season. They beat West Bromwich Albion 2–0 on 28 August with goals from Dean Whitehead and Neill Collins. Keane was appointed Sunderland manager on the same day, signing a three-year contract, with Tony Loughlan as assistant manager. On the transfer window deadline day, Keane secured the signings of Dwight Yorke from Sydney, Ross Wallace and Stanislav Varga from Celtic for a combined fee of £1,100,000. He also brought in Liam Miller from Manchester United, Graham Kavanagh and David Connolly who both joined from Wigan Athletic.

=== September ===
With a strengthened squad, Keane achieved his first win as a manager over Derby County on 9 September, when Chris Brown and debutant Ross Wallace scored. Sunderland continued their successful start under the new manager with a 3–0 win over Leeds United on 13 September. The goals came from new recruits Graham Kavanagh and Liam Miller while Stephen Elliott grabbed the other goal. Their next opponents were Leicester City on 16 September. This game was Keane's first at home, and Tobias Hysén scored a goal to make sure they remained unbeaten under him. Sunderland experienced their first defeat under the new manager against Ipswich Town on 23 September. They originally took the lead through a Jason de Vos own goal, but were eventually beaten 3–1. They returned to winning ways the next match on 30 September, as a Grant Leadbitter strike lead them to a 1–0 win against Sheffield Wednesday.

=== October ===
During the break for international games, Sunderland allowed Rory Delap and Jonathan Stead to join Stoke City and Derby County respectively on loan deals. They played their next match against Preston North End on 14 October, where they were beaten 4–1; Stanislav Varga scored the only Sunderland goal. They then met Stoke City on 17 October where they were beaten 2–1 despite having taken the lead through a Dwight Yorke goal. Delap, who was making his debut after recently joining Stoke on loan from Sunderland, suffered a broken leg after a tackle from Robbie Elliott. Sunderland themselves dipped into the loan market, signing left back Lewin Nyatanga from Derby County until January. They played Barnsley on 21 October, and goals from Dean Whitehead and Chris Brown earned them a 2–0 win. Sunderland achieved back-to-back wins when they beat Hull City 1–0 on 28 October. Ross Wallace scored a last minute goal but was sent off after removing his shirt in celebration. Sunderland played Cardiff City next on 31 October, and were beaten 2–1. Manager Keane said "We were very, very poor. We lost it everywhere – the goal we gave away, our passing, our tackling, our movement; everything really was poor."

== Match results ==
=== Legend ===
Win	Draw	Loss

=== Pre-season ===
Game	Date	Opponent	Venue	Result	Attendance	Goalscorers	Notes
1	15 July 2006	Forest Green Rovers	Away	3–0	1,450	Lawrence, Murphy, Whitehead	
2	19 July 2006	Rotherham United	Away	2–0	–	Murphy, Stead	
3	24 July 2006	Shelbourne	Away	2–0	–	Murphy, Delap	
4	29 July 2006	Carlisle United	Away	3–0	7,036	Stead, Lawrence, Leadbitter	

=== Championship ===
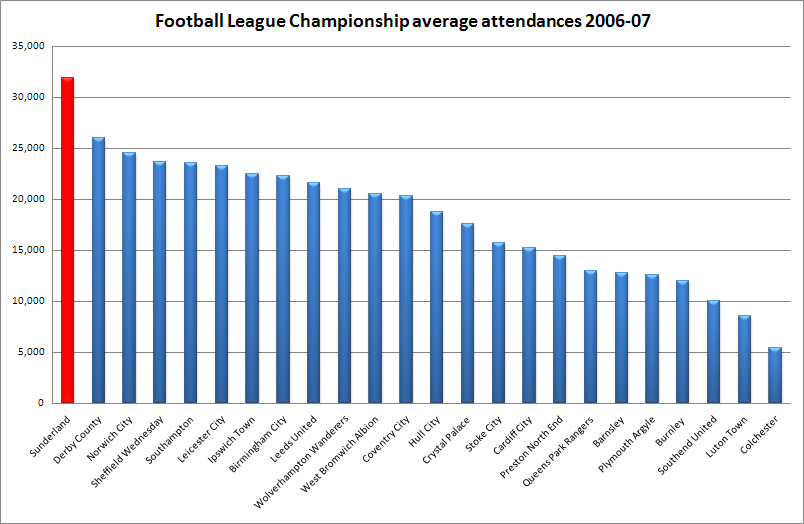
Sunderland recorded the highest average attendance during the 2006–07 Football League Championship season

==== League table ====
Pos	Team	Pld	W	D	L	GF	GA	GD	Pts	Promotion, qualification or relegation
1	Sunderland (C, P)	46	27	7	12	76	47	+29	88	Promotion to the Premier League
2	Birmingham City (P)	46	26	8	12	67	42	+25	86	Promotion to the Premier League
3	Derby County (O, P)	46	25	9	12	62	46	+16	84	Qualification for Championship play-offs
4	West Bromwich Albion	46	22	10	14	81	55	+26	76	Qualification for Championship play-offs
5	Wolverhampton Wanderers	46	22	10	14	59	56	+3	76	Qualification for Championship play-offs

Source: RSSSF
Rules for classification: In the Football League goals scored (F) takes precedence over goal difference (GD).
(C) Champions; (O) Play-off winners; (P) Promoted

==== Results summary ====
Overall								Home						Away					
Pld	W	D	L	GF	GA	GD	Pts	W	D	L	GF	GA	GD	W	D	L	GF	GA	GD
46	27	7	12	76	47	+29	88	15	4	4	38	18	+20	12	3	8	38	29	+9

Last updated: 4 December 2018.
Source: 11v11

==== Results by matchday ====
Round	1	2	3	4	5	6	7	8	9	10	11	12	13	14	15	16	17	18	19	20	21	22	23	24	25	26	27	28	29	30	31	32	33	34	35	36	37	38	39	40	41	42	43	44	45	46
Ground	A	H	H	A	H	A	A	H	A	H	A	A	H	A	H	A	H	H	A	A	H	H	A	A	H	H	A	H	A	H	H	A	H	A	H	A	A	H	H	A	H	A	H	A	H	A
Result	L	L	L	L	W	W	W	D	L	W	L	L	W	W	L	L	D	W	D	W	W	W	D	L	W	L	W	W	W	D	W	W	W	D	W	W	W	D	W	W	W	W	W	L	W	W
Position	19	22	21	24	23	21	14	14	17	14	17	19	17	13	15	17	19	15	16	14	14	12	11	11	11	12	10	9	7	9	7	7	5	5	4	4	3	3	2	2	2	1	1	1	1	1

A = Away; H = Home; W = Win; D = Draw; L = Loss

Game	Date	Opponent	Venue	Result	Attendance	Goalscorers	Notes
1	6 August 2006	Coventry City	Away	1–2	22,366	Murphy	
2	9 August 2006	Birmingham City	Home	0–1	26,668		
3	12 August 2006	Plymouth Argyle	Home	2–3	24,377	Murphy, Elliott	
4	19 August 2006	Southend United	Away	1–3	9,848	Stead	
5	28 August 2006	West Bromwich Albion	Home	2–0	24,242	Whitehead, N. Collins	
6	9 September 2006	Derby County	Away	2–1	26,502	Brown, Wallace	
7	13 September 2006	Leeds United	Away	3–0	23,037	Miller, Kavanagh, Elliott	
8	16 September 2006	Leicester City	Home	1–1	35,104	Hysen	
9	23 September 2006	Ipswich Town	Away	1–3	23,311	De Vos (o.g.)	
10	30 September 2006	Sheffield Wednesday	Home	1–0	36,764	Leadbitter	
11	14 October 2006	Preston North End	Away	1–4	19,603	Varga	
12	17 October 2006	Stoke City	Away	1–2	14,482	Yorke	
13	21 October 2006	Barnsley	Home	2–0	27,918	Whitehead, Brown	
14	28 October 2006	Hull City	Away	1–0	25,512	Wallace	
15	31 October 2006	Cardiff City	Home	1–2	26,528	Brown	
16	4 November 2006	Norwich City	Away	0–1	24,852		
17	11 November 2006	Southampton	Home	1–1	25,667	Wallace	
18	18 November 2006	Colchester United	Home	3–1	25,197	Elliott (2), Connolly	
19	24 November 2006	Wolverhampton Wanderers	Away	1–1	27,203	Elliott	
20	28 November 2006	Queens Park Rangers	Away	2–1	13,108	Murphy, Leadbitter	
21	2 December 2006	Norwich City	Home	1–0	27,934	Murphy	
22	9 December 2006	Luton Town	Home	2–1	30,445	Murphy, Connolly	
23	16 December 2006	Burnley	Away	2–2	14,798	Leadbitter, Connolly	
24	22 December 2006	Crystal Palace	Away	0–1	17,439		
25	26 December 2006	Leeds United	Home	2–0	40,116	Connolly, Leadbitter	
26	30 December 2006	Preston North End	Home	0–1	30,460		
27	1 January 2007	Leicester City	Away	2–0	21,975	Hysén, Connolly	
28	13 January 2007	Ipswich Town	Home	1–0	27,604	Connolly	
29	20 January 2007	Sheffield Wednesday	Away	4–2	29,103	Yorke, Hysén, Connolly, Edwards	
30	30 January 2007	Crystal Palace	Home	0–0	26,958		
31	3 February 2007	Coventry City	Home	2–0	33,591	Yorke, Edwards	
32	10 February 2007	Plymouth Argyle	Away	2–0	15,247	Connolly, Stokes	
33	17 February 2007	Southend United	Home	4–0	33,376	Connolly, Hysen, John (2)	
34	20 February 2007	Birmingham City	Away	1–1	20,941	Edwards	
35	24 February 2007	Derby County	Home	2–1	36,049	Connolly, Miller	
36	3 March 2007	West Bromwich Albion	Away	2–1	23,252	Yorke, John	
37	10 March 2007	Barnsley	Away	2–0	18,207	Leadbitter, Connolly	
38	13 March 2007	Stoke City	Home	2–2	31,358	Whitehead, Murphy	
39	17 March 2007	Hull City	Home	2–0	38,488	Evans, John	
40	31 March 2007	Cardiff City	Away	1–0	19,353	Wallace	
41	7 April 2007	Wolverhampton Wanderers	Home	2–1	40,748	Murphy, Wallace	
42	9 April 2007	Southampton	Away	2–1	25,766	Edwards, Leadbitter	
43	14 April 2007	Queens Park Rangers	Home	2–1	39,206	Whitehead, Leadbitter	
44	21 April 2007	Colchester United	Away	1–3	6,042	Yorke	
45	27 April 2007	Burnley	Home	3–2	44,448	Murphy, Connolly, Edwards	
46	6 May 2007	Luton Town	Away	5–0	10,260	Murphy (2), Stokes, Wallace, Connolly	

=== FA Cup ===
Round	Date	Opponent	Venue	Result	Attendance	Goalscorers	Notes
3	6 January 2007	Preston North End	Away	0–1	10,318		

=== League Cup ===
Round	Date	Opponent	Venue	Result	Attendance	Goalscorers	Notes
1	22 August 2006	Bury	Away	0–2	2,930		

== Player details ==
All players at the club with season in progress included. Duplicate squad numbers indicate departed players and current players.

No.	Pos.	Name	League		FA Cup		League Cup		Total		Discipline	
No.	Pos.	Name	Apps	Goals	Apps	Goals	Apps	Goals	Apps	Goals	Yellow card	Red card
1	GK	Ben Alnwick	11 (0)	0	0	0	1	0	12 (0)	0	0	0
2	DF	Stephen Wright	2 (1)	0	0	0	1	0	3 (1)	0	1	0
3	DF	George McCartney	0	0	0	0	0	0	0	0	0	0
3	DF	Lewin Nyatanga	9 (2)	0	0	0	0	0	9 (2)	0	0	0
3	DF	Danny Simpson	13 (1)	0	0	0	0	0	13 (1)	0	2	0
4	MF	Rory Delap	6	0	0	0	1	0	7	0	1	0
4	DF	Jonny Evans	18	1	0	1	0	0	19	1	3	0
5	DF	Kenny Cunningham	11	0	0	0	1	0	12	0	1	0
6	DF	Steven Caldwell	11	0	0	0	0	0	0	0	2	0
7	MF	Liam Lawrence	10 (2)	0	0	0	0 (1)	0	10 (3)	0	1	0
7	MF	Carlos Edwards	15	5	0 (1)	0	0	0	15 (1)	5	1	0
8	MF	Dean Whitehead (c)	43 (2)	4	1	0	1	0	45 (2)	4	7	0
9	FW	Jonathan Stead	1 (4)	1	0	0	0 (1)	0	1 (5)	1	0	0
9	FW	Anthony Stokes	7 (7)	2	0	0	0	0	7 (7)	2	1	0
10	FW	Stephen Elliott	15 (9)	5	1	0	1	0	17 (9)	5	0	0
11	FW	Daryl Murphy	27 (11)	10	1	0	1	0	29 (11)	10	1	0
12	DF	Nyron Nosworthy	27 (2)	0	0	0	0	0	27 (2)	0	4	0
13	GK	Darren Ward	30	0	1	0	0	0	31	0	0	0
14	MF	Tommy Miller	3 (1)	0	0	0	0	0	3 (1)	0	0	0
15	DF	Danny Collins	36 (2)	0	0 (1)	0	0 (1)	0	36 (4)	0	4	0
16	FW	Kevin Kyle	0 (2)	0	0	0	0	0	0 (2)	0	0	0
16	MF	Tobias Hysén	15 (11)	4	1	0	0	0	16 (11)	0	0	0
17	MF	Andy Welsh	0	0	0	0	0	0	0	0	0	0
18	MF	William Mocquet	0	0	0	0	0	0	0	0	0	0
19	MF	Arnau Riera	0 (1)	0	0	0	1	0	1 (1)	0	0	1
20	FW	Chris Brown	10 (6)	3	0	0	0	0	10 (6)	3	4	0
20	FW	Stern John	10 (5)	4	0	0	0	0	10 (5)	4	0	0
21	FW	Kevin Smith	0	0	0	0	0	0	0	0	0	0
22	DF	Clive Clarke	2 (2)	0	0	0	0	0	2 (2)	0	0	0
23	MF	Grant Leadbitter	24 (20)	7	1	0	1	0	26 (20)	7	3	0
24	GK	Trevor Carson	0	0	0	0	0	0	0	0	0	0
25	DF	Neill Collins	6 (1)	1	0	0	1	0	7 (1)	1	0	0
26	DF	Robbie Elliott	7	0	0	0	1	0	8	0	0	0
27	DF	Stanislav Varga	20	1	1	0	0	0	21	1	7	0
28	DF	Dan Smith	0	0	0	0	0	0	0	0	0	0
28	MF	Graham Kavanagh	10 (4)	1	0	0	0	0	10 (4)	1	3	0
29	DF	Peter Hartley	0 (1)	0	0	0	0	0	0 (1)	0	0	0
30	MF	Jake Richardson	0	0	0	0	0	0	0	0	0	0
31	MF	Christian Bassila	0	0	0	0	0	0	0	0	0	0
31	FW	David Connolly	30 (6)	13	1	0	0	0	31 (6)	13	1	0
32	GK	Márton Fülöp	5	0	0	0	0	0	5	0	0	0
33	MF	Ross Wallace	20 (12)	6	1	0	0	0	21 (12)	6	5	2
34	MF	Dwight Yorke	28 (4)	5	0 (1)	0	0	0	28 (5)	5	6	0
36	MF	Liam Miller	24 (6)	2	1	0	0	0	25 (6)	2	7	1

== Transfers ==
=== In ===
Date	Pos	Name	From	Fee	Notes
23 May 2006	GK	Trevor Carson	Youth system	–	
23 May 2006	DF	Peter Hartley	Youth system	–	
19 July 2006	DF	Kenny Cunningham	Birmingham City	Free	
4 August 2006	GK	Darren Ward	Norwich City	Free	
4 August 2006	DF	Robbie Elliott	Newcastle United	Free	
8 August 2006	DF	Clive Clarke	West Ham United	£400,000	
10 August 2006	MF	Arnau Riera	Barcelona B	Free	
22 August 2006	MF	William Mocquet	Le Havre	Undisclosed	
23 August 2006	MF	Tobias Hysén	Djurgården	£1,700,000	
31 August 2006	MF	Dwight Yorke	Sydney	£200,000	
31 August 2006	MF	Graham Kavanagh	Wigan Athletic	£500,000	
31 August 2006	DF	Stanislav Varga	Celtic	£1,100,000	
31 August 2006	MF	Ross Wallace	Celtic	£1,100,000	
31 August 2006	MF	Liam Miller	Manchester United	Free	
31 August 2006	FW	David Connolly	Wigan Athletic	£1,900,000	
2 January 2007	GK	Márton Fülöp	Tottenham Hotspur	£500,000	
2 January 2007	MF	Carlos Edwards	Luton Town	£1,500,000	
8 January 2007	FW	Anthony Stokes	Arsenal	£2,000,000	
29 January 2007	FW	Stern John	Coventry City	Undisclosed fee	

=== Out ===
Date	Pos	Name	To	Fee	Notes
21 July 2006	GK	Kelvin Davis	Southampton	£1,250,000	
26 July 2006	MF	Julio Arca	Middlesbrough	£1,750,000	
31 July 2006	MF	Christian Bassila	AEL	Free	
8 August 2006	DF	George McCartney	West Ham United	£1,000,000	
18 August 2006	DF	Dan Smith	Aberdeen	Undisclosed fee	
25 August 2006	FW	Kevin Kyle	Coventry City	£600,000	
2 January 2007	DF	Robbie Elliott	Leeds United	Free	
2 January 2007	MF	Liam Lawrence	Stoke City	£650,000	
2 January 2007	GK	Ben Alnwick	Tottenham Hotspur	£900,000	
5 January 2007	DF	Neill Collins	Wolverhampton Wanderers	£150,000	
9 January 2007	MF	Rory Delap	Stoke City	Free	
11 January 2007	FW	Jonathan Stead	Sheffield United	£1,250,000	
11 January 2007	FW	Chris Brown	Norwich City	£325,000	
1 February 2007	DF	Steven Caldwell	Burnley	£400,000	
23 March 2007	MF	Andy Welsh	Toronto	Free	

=== Loans in ===
Date	Pos	Name	From	To	Notes
19 October 2006	DF	Lewin Nyatanga	Derby County	1 January 2007	
23 November 2006	GK	Márton Fülöp	Tottenham Hotspur	1 January 2007	
4 January 2007	DF	Jonny Evans	Manchester United	End of season	
25 January 2007	DF	Danny Simpson	Manchester United	End of season	

=== Loans out ===
Date	Pos	Name	To	Until	Notes
11 October 2006	MF	Rory Delap	Stoke City	9 January 2007	
13 October 2006	FW	Jonathan Stead	Derby County	2 January 2007	
16 October 2006	MF	Andy Welsh	Leicester City	31 December 2006	
23 October 2006	MF	Clive Clarke	Coventry City	1 January 2007	
18 November 2006	MF	Liam Lawrence	Stoke City	2 January 2007	
2 December 2006	DF	Neill Collins	Wolverhampton Wanderers	2 January 2007	
31 October 2006	FW	Kevin Smith	Wrexham	31 November 2006	
14 November 2006	MF	Tommy Miller	Preston North End	1 January 2007	
23 November 2006	MF	William Mocquet	Rochdale	4 January 2007	
23 November 2006	MF	Arnau Riera	Southend United	1 January 2007	
9 January 2007	FW	Kevin Smith	Dundee United	1 May 2007	
23 March 2007	MF	William Mocquet	Bury	End of season	
