= Cristian Gómez =

Cristian Gómez is the name of:

- Cristian Gómez (footballer, born 1987), Argentine footballer
- Cristian Gómez (footballer, born 1989), Spanish footballer
- Cristián Gómez (born 1978), Chilean footballer
- Christian Gómez (born 1974), Argentine footballer
- Christian Gómez (Venezuelan footballer) (born 1999)
