= 2015–16 Sheffield United F.C. season =

Sheffield United
2015–16 season
- Chairman: David Green
- Manager: Nigel Adkins
- Stadium: Bramall Lane
- League One: 11th
- FA Cup: Third round (eliminated by Manchester United)
- League Cup: Second round (eliminated by Fulham)
- FL Trophy: Northern Area quarter-finals (eliminated by Fleetwood Town)
Home colours	Away colours

The 2015–16 season was Sheffield United's 127th season in their history and their fifth consecutive season in League One. Along with League One, the club also competed in the FA Cup, League Cup and Football League Trophy. The season covers the period from 1 July 2015 to 30 June 2016.

== Season overview ==
=== Pre-season ===
Following another failed play-off campaign, manager Nigel Clough was sacked with the club board stating "A change in direction was necessary for the forthcoming season." After having an enquiry about Bradford City's Phil Parkinson to succeed Clough, on 2 June Nigel Adkins was installed as Sheffield United's new manager. On 13 July, Diego De Girolamo signed a new two-year contract with the Blades, having initially rejecting a new offer. The following day, United announced the signing of Martyn Woolford on a free-transfer with him committing to Bramall Lane on a two-year deal.

== Transfers ==
=== Transfers in ===
Date from	Position	Nationality	Name	From	Fee	Ref.
14 July 2015	LW	ENG	Martyn Woolford	Millwall	Free transfer	
25 July 2015	CF	ENG	Billy Sharp	Leeds United	Undisclosed	
26 August 2015	DF	ENG	Jake Phillips	Llandudno		

=== Transfers out ===
Date from	Position	Nationality	Name	To	Fee	Ref.
1 July 2015	CB	ENG	Sam Berry	Alfreton Town (Note: Following Berry's release he joined Alfreton Town.)	Free transfer	
1 July 2015	CM	ENG	Ben Davies	Portsmouth (Note: Following Davies' release he joined Portsmouth.)	Free transfer	
1 July 2015	CM	IRL	Michael Doyle	Portsmouth (Note: Following Doyle's release he joined Portsmouth.)	Free transfer	
1 July 2015	MF	ENG	Jason Paling	Alfreton Town	Free transfer	
1 July 2015	MF	ENG	Kyle Scarisbrick	Free Agent	Released	
1 July 2015	GK	SCO	Iain Turner	Tranmere Rovers (Note: Following Turner's release he joined Tranmere Rovers.)	Released	
14 August 2015	CF	SCO	Jamie Murphy	Brighton & Hove Albion	£1,500,000	
7 January 2016	DF	ENG	Craig Alcock	Doncaster Rovers	Undisclosed	
25 January 2016	MF	PAK	Otis Khan	Barnsley	Released	
1 February 2016	MF	ENG	Connor Dimaio	Chesterfield	Released	
1 February 2016	FW	ENG	Michael Higdon	Tranmere Rovers	Released	
11 March 2016	CB	SCO	Neill Collins	Tampa Bay Rowdies	Released	

Total income: ▲£1,500,000

=== Loans in ===
Date from	Position	Nationality	Name	From	Date until	Ref.
25 July 2015	CF	IRL	Conor Sammon	Derby County	End of season	
10 August 2015	CB	CAN	David Edgar	Birmingham City	End of season	
20 October 2015	MF	ENG	Dean Hammond	Leicester City	1 January 2016	
1 March 2016	DF	ENG	Alex Baptiste	Middlesbrough	End of season	

=== Loans out ===
Date from	Position	Nationality	Name	To	Date until	Ref.
7 August 2015	AM	ENG	Dominic Calvert-Lewin	Northampton Town	January 2016	
29 August 2015	AM	ENG	David Brooks	FC Halifax Town	27 September 2015	
29 August 2015	RW	IRL	CJ Hamilton	FC Halifax Town	27 September 2015	
3 September 2015	GK	ENG	George Willis	Matlock Town	3 October 2015	
11 September 2015	DF	ENG	Julian Banton	FC Halifax Town	10 October 2015	
23 September 2015	CF	ENG	Michael Higdon	Oldham Athletic	19 December 2015	
30 October 2015	MF	PAK	Otis Khan	Barrow	30 November 2015	
6 November 2015	FW	SCO	Marc McNulty	Portsmouth	1 January 2015	
10 November 2015	DF	ENG	Craig Alcock	Doncaster Rovers	8 December 2015	
19 November 2015	DF	ENG	Terry Kennedy	Cambridge United	3 January 2016	
26 November 2015	MF	ENG	Callum McFadzean	Stevenage	1 January 2016	
12 January 2016	MF	ENG	James Wallace	Shrewsbury Town	End of season	
28 January 2016	DF	ENG	Kieron Freeman	Portsmouth	End of season	
18 February 2016	DF	SCO	Bob Harris	Fleetwood Town	End of season	
18 March 2016	MF	SCO	Stefan Scougall	Fleetwood Town	End of season	
19 March 2016	MF	ENG	Jamal Campbell-Ryce	Chesterfield	End of season	

=== Contracts ===
New contracts and contract extensions.

Player	Date	Length	Contracted until	Ref.
(Italy) Diego De Girolamo	13 July 2015	2 Year	Summer 2017	
(Myanmar) Kler Heh	July 2015	?	?	
(England) Louis Reed	24 July 2015	3 Year	Summer 2018	
(England) Che Adams	25 August 2015	3 Year	Summer 2018	

== Competitions ==
=== Pre-season friendlies ===
On 4 June 2015, Sheffield United announce they will play Newcastle United for Chris Morgan's testimonial. On 9 June 2015, a confirmed list of the club's pre-season schedule was released.

18 July 2015 Friendly	Ilkeston	0–1	Sheffield United	Ilkeston
15:00 BST		Report	Calvert-Lewin 85'	Stadium: New Manor Ground; Attendance: 1,278

21 July 2015 Friendly	Cheltenham Town	1–3	Sheffield United	Cheltenham
19:45 BST	Morgan-Smith 45'	Report	Adams 13'; Higdon 89'; Baxter 90'	Stadium: Whaddon Road; Attendance: 1,247 (236 Blades fans)

23 July 2015 Friendly	Exeter City	1–2	Sheffield United	Exeter
19:30 BST	Nichols 56'	Report	Collins 15'; Adams 79'	Stadium: St James Park; Attendance: 1,122 (192 Blades fans)

26 July 2015 Chris Morgan Testimonial	Sheffield United	2–2	Newcastle United	Sheffield
13:00 BST	McNulty 47'; Freeman 87'	Report	Wijnaldum 45' de Jong 78'	Stadium: Bramall Lane

29 July 2015 Friendly	Macclesfield Town	0–4	Sheffield United	Macclesfield
19:30 BST		Report	Diagne 11' (o.g.); Sharp 13'; Adams 61', 89'	Stadium: Moss Rose; Attendance: 999 (551 Blades)

2 August 2015 Friendly	Sheffield United	1–1	Hull City	Sheffield
15:00 BST	Murphy 44'	Report	Hernández 78'	Stadium: Bramall Lane

=== League One ===
==== League table ====
Pos	Team	Pld	W	D	L	GF	GA	GD	Pts
9	Gillingham	46	19	12	15	71	56	+15	69
10	Rochdale	46	19	12	15	68	61	+7	69
11	Sheffield United	46	18	12	16	64	59	+5	66
12	Port Vale	46	18	11	17	56	58	−2	65
13	Peterborough United	46	19	6	21	82	73	+9	63

Updated to match(es) played on 1 July 2016. Source: BBC Sport
Rules for classification: 1) Points; 2) Goal difference; 3) Number of goals scored

==== Results by matchday ====
Matchday	1	2	3	4	5	6	7	8	9	10	11	12	13	14	15	16	17	18	19	20	21	22	23	24	25	26	27	28	29	30	31	32	33	34	35	36	37	38	39	40	41	42	43	44	45	46
Ground	A	H	A	H	A	H	H	A	H	A	A	H	A	H	H	A	H	A	H	A	H	A	H	H	A	A	H	A	H	A	A	H	A	H	A	H	A	H	A	H	H	A	A	H	A	H
Result	L	W	W	W	W	L	L	D	W	D	L	W	D	W	L	L	D	D	L	D	W	W	W	L	D	W	D	D	L	W	L	W	L	L	D	W	L	W	L	W	D	W	W	D	L	L
Position	24	12	7	4	2	5	5	7	6	6	7	6	6	5	6	8	8	11	12	12	11	9	8	8	7	7	8	7	10	8	9	7	10	12	11	11	12	11	13	8	10	9	8	9	10	11

Updated to match(es) played on 13 May 2016. Source: Statto.com
A = Away; H = Home; W = Win; D = Draw; L = Loss

==== Matches ====
8 August 2015 1	Gillingham	4–0	Sheffield United	Gillingham
15:00 BST	Norris 8'; Oshilaja 43'; Egan 82'; Dack 90'	Report		Stadium: Priestfield Stadium; Attendance: 7,511; Referee: Lee Collins

15 August 2015 2	Sheffield United	2–0	Chesterfield	Sheffield
15:00 BST	Adams 3', 46'	Report		Stadium: Bramall Lane; Attendance: 23,031; Referee: Kevin Wright

18 August 2015 3	Peterborough United	1–3	Sheffield United	Peterborough
19:30 BST	Coulibaly 59'	Report	Sammon 15', 72'; Baxter 85'	Stadium: London Road; Attendance: 6,526; Referee: Nigel Miller

22 August 2015 4	Sheffield United	2–0	Blackpool	Sheffield
15:00 BST	Sharp 60'; McNulty 72'	Report		Stadium: Bramall Lane; Attendance: 5,224; Referee: Darren Dreadman

29 August 2015 5	Swindon Town	0–2	Sheffield United	Swindon
15:00 BST		Report	Collins 70'; Sharp 75'	Stadium: County Ground; Attendance: 8,614; Referee: Chris Sarginson

12 September 2015 6	Sheffield United	1–3	Bury	Sheffield
15:00 BST	Sharp 72' (pen.)	Report	Pope 61'; Riley 83'; L. Clarke 90'	Stadium: Bramall Lane; Attendance: 20,708; Referee: David Webb

15 September 2015 7	Sheffield United	2–3	Colchester United	Sheffield
19:45 BST	Sharp 51' (pen.); Woolford 61'	Report	Moncur 6', 23'; Sordell 82'; Elokobi (red card) 86'	Stadium: Brammall Lane; Attendance: 17,623; Referee: Darren Handley

20 September 2015 8	Bradford City	2–2	Sheffield United	Bradford
12:00 BST	Meredith 33'; Cole 47'	Report	Meredith 65' (o.g.); Sharp 70'	Stadium: Valley Parade; Attendance: 19,317; Referee: Neil Swarbrick

26 September 2015 9	Sheffield United	3–1	Doncaster Rovers	Sheffield
15:00 BST	Basham 17'; Sammon 35'; Sharp 79'	Report	Stewart 25'; MacKenzie (red card) 38'	Stadium: Bramall Lane; Attendance: 20,869; Referee: Mark Heywood

29 September 2015 10	Burton Albion	0–0	Sheffield United	Burton upon Trent
19:45 BST		Report		Stadium: Pirelli Stadium; Attendance: 5,029; Referee: Chris Kavanagh

3 October 2015 11	Port Vale	2–1	Sheffield United	Burslem
15:00	Moore 17'; Ikpeazu 45'	Report	Done 90+5'	Stadium: Vale Park; Attendance: 6,822; Referee: Graham Salisbury

10 October 2015 12	Sheffield United	3–2	Rochdale	Sheffield
15:00 BST	Adams 29', 40'; Collins 74'	Report	Vincenti 37' (pen.); Alessandra 72'	Stadium: Bramall Lane; Attendance: 19,039; Referee: Oliver Langford

17 October 2015 13	Oldham Athletic	1–1	Sheffield United	Oldham
15:00 BST	Philliskirk 10'; Burn (red card) 62'	Report	Done 30'	Stadium: Boundary Park; Attendance: 5,743; Referee: Kevin Wright

20 October 2015 14	Sheffield United	3–0	Fleetwood	Sheffield
19:45 BST	Adams 1', 64'; Sharp 72'	Report		Stadium: Bramall Lane; Attendance: 17,879; Referee: Eddie Ilderton

24 October 2015 15	Sheffield United	1–2	Millwall	Sheffield
12:15 BST	Baxter 70'	Report	O'Brien 30'; O'Brien 80'	Stadium: Bramall Lane; Attendance: 19,617; Referee: Andy Haines

31 October 2015 16	Crewe Alexandra	1–0	Sheffield United	Crewe
15:00 GMT	Colclough 71'	Report		Stadium: Gresty Road; Attendance: 5,227; Referee: Fred Graham

14 November 2015 17	Sheffield United	2–2	Southend	Sheffield
15:00 GMT	Baxter 36'; Collins 45'	Report	Leonard 29'; Payne 31'	Stadium: Bramall Lane; Attendance: 19,007; Referee: Scott Duncan

21 November 2015 18	Walsall	1–1	Sheffield United	Bescot
15:00 GMT	Bradshaw 51'	Report	Baxter 66'	Stadium: Bescot Stadium; Attendance: 5,780; Referee: Geoff Eltringham

24 November 2015 19	Sheffield United	2–4	Shrewsbury	Sheffield
19:45 GMT	Sammon 17'; Hammond 65'	Report	Kaikai 25'; Black 26'; Vernon 35'; Collins 48'	Stadium: Bramall Lane; Attendance: 17,843; Referee: Richard Clark

28 November 2015 20	Barnsley	1–1	Sheffield United	Barnsley
12:15 GMT	Hourihane 90+5'	Report	Basham 14'	Stadium: Oakwell; Attendance: 13,571; Referee: Neil Swarbrick

13 December 2015 21	Sheffield United	1–0	Coventry City	Sheffield
12:00 GMT	Sharp 79'	Report		Stadium: Bramall Lane; Attendance: 18,074; Referee: Iain Williamson

19 December 2015 22	Scunthorpe United	0–1	Sheffield United	Scunthorpe
15:00 GMT		Report	Sharp 50'	Stadium: Glanford Park; Attendance: 5,150; Referee: Andy Haines

26 December 2015 Postponed	Wigan Athletic	P–P	Sheffield United	Wigan
15:00 GMT		Report		Stadium: DW Stadium

28 December 2015 23	Sheffield United	3–1	Bradford City	Sheffield
15:00 GMT	Sharp 11'; McEveley (yellow card) 21'; Sammon 59'; Edgar 63'; Basham (yellow card) 81'; Long (yellow card) 90+3'	Report	Liddle 83'	Stadium: Bramall Lane; Attendance: 24,777; Referee: (England) Mark Haywood

2 January 2016 24	Sheffield United	2–3	Peterborough United	Sheffield
15:00 GMT	Sharp 32' (pen.); McEveley (yellow card) 51'; Hammond (yellow card) 67'; Baldwin 84' (o.g.)	Report	Washington 18'; Ricardo (yellow card) 38'; Fox (yellow card) 41'; Oztumer 48'; Samuelsen 84'	Stadium: Bramall Lane; Attendance: 22,302; Referee: (England) Darren Bond

12 January 2016 25	Wigan Athletic	3–3	Sheffield United	Wigan
19:45 GMT	Grigg 16'; Perkins (yellow card) 30'; Daniels (yellow card) 40'; Vučkić 43'; McCann 66'; Power (yellow card) 87'	Report	Hammond (yellow card) 36'; Collins (yellow card) 47'; Sharp (yellow card) 59' (goal) 75'; Done 68' 89'	Stadium: DW Stadium; Attendance: 10,113; Referee: Andy Woolmer

16 January 2016 26	Colchester United	1–2	Sheffield United	Colchester
15:00 GMT				Stadium: Colchester Community Stadium

23 January 2016 27	Sheffield United	1–1	Swindon Town	Sheffield
15:00 GMT				Stadium: Bramall Lane

26 January 2016 28	Blackpool	0–0	Sheffield United	Blackpool
19:45 GMT				Stadium: Bloomfield Road

6 February 2016 29	Sheffield United	0–2	Wigan Athletic	Sheffield
15:00 GMT				Stadium: Bramall Lane

13 February 2016 30	Doncaster Rovers	0–1	Sheffield United	Doncaster
15:00 GMT				Stadium: Keepmoat Stadium

16 February 2016 31	Bury	1–0	Sheffield United	Bury
19:45 GMT				Stadium: Gigg Lane

20 February 2016 32	Sheffield United	1–0	Port Vale	Sheffield
15:00 GMT				Stadium: Bramall Lane

27 February 2016 33	Rochdale	2–0	Sheffield United	Rochdale
15:00 GMT				Stadium: Spotland Stadium

1 March 2016 34	Sheffield United	0–1	Burton Albion	Sheffield
19:45 GMT				Stadium: Bramall Lane

5 March 2016 35	Fleetwood Town	2–2	Sheffield United	Fleetwood
15:00 GMT				Stadium: Highbury Stadium

12 March 2016 36	Sheffield United	3–0	Oldham Athletic	Sheffield
15:00 GMT				Stadium: Bramall Lane

19 March 2016 37	Millwall	1–0	Sheffield United	Bermondsey
15:00 GMT				Stadium: The Den

25 March 2016 38	Sheffield United	3–2	Crewe Alexandra	Sheffield
15:00 GMT				Stadium: Bramall Lane

30 March 2016 39	Southend United	3–1	Sheffield United	Southend-on-Sea
19:45 BST				Stadium: Roots Hall

2 April 2016 40	Sheffield United	2–0	Walsall	Sheffield
15:00 BST				Stadium: Bramall Lane

9 April 2016 41	Sheffield United	0–0	Gillingham	Sheffield
15:00 BST				Stadium: Bramall Lane

16 April 2016 42	Chesterfield	0–3	Sheffield United	Chesterfield
13:00 BST				Stadium: Proact Stadium

19 April 2016 43	Shrewsbury Town	1–2	Sheffield United	Shrewsbury
19:45 BST				Stadium: New Meadow

23 April 2016 44	Sheffield United	0–0	Barnsley	Sheffield
12:30 BST				Stadium: Bramall Lane

30 April 2016 45	Coventry City	3–1	Sheffield United	Coventry
15:00 BST				Stadium: Ricoh Arena

8 May 2016 46	Sheffield United	0–2	Scunthorpe United	Sheffield
12:30 BST				Stadium: Bramall Lane

=== FA Cup ===
7 November 2015 First round	Sheffield United	3–0	Worcester City	Sheffield
15:00 GMT	Baxter 19' (pen.); Sammon 81'; Freeman 90+1'	Report		Stadium: Bramall Lane; Attendance: 11,108; Referee: Simon Bennett

5 December 2015 Second round	Sheffield United	1–0	Oldham Athletic	Sheffield
15:00 GMT	Done 47'; Adams (red card) 67'	Report		Stadium: Bramall Lane; Attendance: 6,938; Referee: Eddie Ilderton

9 January 2016 Third round	Manchester United	1–0	Sheffield United	Manchester
17:30 GMT	Rooney 90+3' (pen.)	Report		Stadium: Old Trafford; Attendance: 74,284; Referee: Jonathan Moss

=== League Cup ===
On 16 June 2015, the first round draw was made, Sheffield United were drawn away against Morecambe. In the second round, the Blades were drawn away to Fulham.

11 August 2015 First round	Morecambe	0–1	Sheffield United	Morecambe
19:45 BST		Report	Collins 90'	Stadium: Globe Arena; Attendance: 2,168; Referee: Steve Martin

25 August 2015 Second round	Fulham	3–0	Sheffield United	Fulham
19:45 BST	McCormack 62' (pen.), 75'; Dembélé 90'	Report	Baxter (red card) 88'; Wallace (red card) 90'	Stadium: Craven Cottage; Attendance: 5,927; Referee: Dean Whitestone

=== Football League Trophy ===
On 8 August 2015, live on Soccer AM the draw for the first round of the Football League Trophy was drawn by Toni Duggan and Alex Scott. In the second round draw, made on 5 September 2015, the Blades were drawn at home to Notts County.

1 September 2015 First Round (Northern Area)	Hartlepool United	1–1 (3–4 p)	Sheffield United	Hartlepool
19:00 BST	Fenwick 51'	Report	Flynn 7'	Stadium: Victoria Park; Attendance: 2,221; Referee: Scott Duncan
	Penalties
	Bingham (penalty scored); Oates (penalty scored); Harrison (penalty missed); Fenwick (penalty missed); Featherstone (penalty scored)		Higdon (penalty scored); Sharp (penalty scored); McNulty (penalty scored); Woolford (penalty missed); McEveley (penalty scored)

6 October 2015 Second Round (Northern Area)	Sheffield United	5–1	Notts County	Bramall Lane, Sheffield
19:45 BST	Baxter 20' (pen.), 36' (pen.); Done 23'; Scougall 67'; Adams 74' (pen.)	Report	Stead 62'	Attendance: 5,497; Referee: Carl Boyeson

10 November 2015 Quarter Finals (Northern Area)	Fleetwood Town	0–0 (4–1 p)	Sheffield United	Highbury Stadium, Fleetwood
19:45 GMT		Report		Attendance: 1,587; Referee: Christopher Kavanagh
	Penalties
	(penalty scored) Grant; (penalty scored) Ball; (penalty scored) Ryan; (penalty scored) Haughton		(penalty scored) Baxter; (penalty missed) Sharp; (penalty missed) McEveley
