= Jordan Adebayo-Smith =

American soccer player (born 2001)

Personal information
- Full name: Adebowale Aderinto Jordan Adebayo-Smith
- Date of birth: January 11, 2001 (age 25)
- Place of birth: Colton, California, United States
- Height: 5 ft 11 in (1.80 m)
- Positions: Forward; winger

Team information
- Current team: Minnesota United
- Number: 99

Youth career
- ProStar
- EastSoccerBase

Senior career*
Years	Team	Apps	(Gls)
2018–2020	Lincoln City	0	(0)
2019	→ Grantham Town (loan)	13	(4)
2019	→ Boston United (loan)	6	(0)
2020	→ Gainsborough Trinity (loan)	6	(2)
2020–2021	Sutton United	1	(0)
2021–2022	Tampa Bay Rowdies	25	(4)
2022	→ New York Red Bulls II (loan)	33	(7)
2023	New England Revolution II	30	(12)
2024–	Minnesota United	11	(0)
2024	Minnesota United 2	17	(5)
2025	→ Detroit City (loan)	16	(0)
- * Club domestic league appearances and goals as of October 25, 2025

Adebowale Aderinto Jordan Adebayo-Smith (born January 11, 2001) is an American professional soccer player who plays as a forward for Major League Soccer side Minnesota United FC. He previously played for Sutton United and Lincoln City and spent time on loan with Grantham Town, Boston United and Gainsborough Trinity.

== Career ==
=== Lincoln City ===
He attended the EastSoccerBase football organisation in South East London and had trials with Cambridge United and Premier League side Watford, before joining Lincoln City on a two-year scholarship in August 2018 following a successful trial in which he scored against Derby County under-23 in a pre-season friendly. He was reportedly being tracked by Huddersfield Town and Wolverhampton Wanderers after scoring a hat-trick for Lincoln in a FA Youth Cup win over South Shields and scoring again in a third-round defeat at West Bromwich Albion. He made his senior debut for the "Imps" in the EFL Trophy, playing the first 63 minutes of a 2–2 draw at Accrington Stanley on December 4. Later that month he was named in "The 11", a list of 11 young footballers apprentices singled out for commendation by the League Football Education (LFE).

==== Loans ====
On February 11, 2019, Adebayo-Smith joined Grantham Town on loan for the remainder of the season. The next day, he made his debut for Grantham Town, scoring twice in a 2–1 win over South Shields F.C. In total, he made 13 appearances for Grantham Town, scoring four times.

In August 2019, Adebayo-Smith joined Boston United on a short-term loan. His lone goal for the club came against his former club Grantham Town in the Lincolnshire Senior Cup semifinals.

Adebayo-Smith joined Northern Premier League club Gainsborough Trinity on January 1, 2020, on loan for the rest of the season. However, his loan was cut short as a result of the COVID-19 pandemic which saw the season's competition formally abandoned on March 26 with all results from the season being expunged, and no promotion or relegation taking place to, from, or within the competition. He made a total of 7 appearances for the Blues in all competitions, scoring 3 goals. Adebayo-Smith was not given a squad number in the 2020–21 season.

On October 16, 2020, Adebayo-Smith had his contract with Lincoln terminated by mutual consent.

=== Sutton United ===
He joined Sutton United on November 30, 2020. On March 3, 2021, it was announced that Adebayo-Smith had left Sutton United in order to pursue in career in the United States.

=== Tampa Bay Rowdies ===
On March 5, 2021, Adebayo-Smith joined USL Championship side Tampa Bay Rowdies for the 2021 season with an option for the 2022 season. Adebayo-Smith made his debut for the Rowdies on May 1, 2021, during a 3–0 victory over Charlotte Independence.

=== New York Red Bulls II ===
In February 2022, the Rowdies sent Adebayo-Smith on loan to New York Red Bulls II for the 2022 USL Championship season. Adebayo-Smith scored his first goal for Red Bulls II on March 16, 2022, in a 1–0 victory versus Atlanta United 2.

=== New England Revolution II ===
On 8 December 2022, Adebayo-Smith signed for MLS Next Pro club New England Revolution II.

=== Minnesota United ===
Adebayo-Smith joined Major League Soccer club Minnesota United on a three-year contract on 15 January 2024.

=== Detroit City FC ===
Adebayo-Smith was sent to Detroit City FC for the 2025 USL Championship season. As of the 5th of September, he's played 10 games with Le Rouge, making the starting XI in 2 of them, so far.

== Style of play ==
Adebayo-Smith has been described by the All Nigeria Soccer website as a "lightning quick and very skillful striker with an eye for goal".

== Personal life ==
Born in the United States, Adebayo-Smith is also eligible to represent Nigeria and England at international level.

== Statistics ==
As of October 16, 2020

Club	Season	League			FA Cup		EFL Cup		Other		Total	
Club	Season	Division	Apps	Goals	Apps	Goals	Apps	Goals	Apps	Goals	Apps	Goals
Lincoln City	2018–19	League Two	0	0	0	0	0	0	1 (Note: Appearance/s in the EFL Trophy.)	0	1	0
Lincoln City	2019–20	League One	0	0	0	0	0	0	0	0	0	0
Lincoln City	2020–21	League One	0	0	0	0	0	0	0	0	0	0
Lincoln City	Total		0	0	0	0	0	0	1	0	1	0
Career total			0	0	0	0	0	0	1	0	1	0
