= 2003–04 Scottish Football League =

Scottish football season

Statistics of the Scottish Football League in season 2003–04.

== Scottish First Division ==
=== League standings ===
Pos	Team	Pld	W	D	L	GF	GA	GD	Pts	Promotion or relegation
1	Inverness CT (C, P)	36	21	7	8	67	33	+34	70	Promotion to the Premier League
2	Clyde	36	20	9	7	64	40	+24	69	
3	St Johnstone	36	15	12	9	59	45	+14	57	
4	Falkirk	36	15	10	11	43	37	+6	55	
5	Queen of the South	36	15	9	12	46	48	−2	54	
6	Ross County	36	12	13	11	49	41	+8	49	
7	St Mirren	36	9	14	13	39	46	−7	41	
8	Raith Rovers	36	8	10	18	37	57	−20	34	
9	Ayr United (R)	36	6	13	17	37	58	−21	31	Relegation to the Second Division
10	Brechin City (R)	36	6	9	21	37	73	−36	27	Relegation to the Second Division

Source: "2003-2004 First Division - SPFL Archive". SPFL.
Rules for classification: 1) points; 2) goal difference; 3) number of goals scored.
(C) Champions; (P) Promoted; (R) Relegated

=== Top scorers ===
Player	Club	Goals
(Scotland) Ian Harty	Clyde	15
(Scotland) Paul Ritchie	Inverness CT	14
(Scotland) David Bingham	Inverness CT	13
(Scotland) Alex Burke	Queen of the South	13
(England) John Sutton	Raith Rovers	13
(Scotland) Pat Keogh	Clyde	12
(England) Sean O'Connor	Queen of the South	12
(Scotland) Barry Wilson	Inverness CT	11
(Finland) Mixu Paatelainen	St Johnstone	11
(Scotland) Andy Smith	Clyde	10
(Scotland) David Winters	Ross County	10

== Scottish Second Division ==
=== League standings ===
Pos	Team	Pld	W	D	L	GF	GA	GD	Pts	Promotion or relegation
1	Airdrie United (C, P)	36	20	10	6	64	36	+28	70	Promotion to the First Division
2	Hamilton Academical (P)	36	18	8	10	70	47	+23	62	Promotion to the First Division
3	Dumbarton	36	18	6	12	56	41	+15	60	
4	Greenock Morton	36	16	11	9	66	58	+8	59	
5	Berwick Rangers	36	14	6	16	61	67	−6	48	
6	Forfar Athletic	36	12	11	13	49	57	−8	47	
7	Alloa Athletic	36	12	8	16	55	55	0	44	
8	Arbroath	36	11	10	15	41	57	−16	43	
9	East Fife (R)	36	11	8	17	38	45	−7	41	Relegation to the Third Division
10	Stenhousemuir (R)	36	7	4	25	28	65	−37	25	Relegation to the Third Division

Source: "2003-2004 Second Division - SPFL Archive". SPFL.
Rules for classification: 1) points; 2) goal difference; 3) number of goals scored.
(C) Champions; (P) Promoted; (R) Relegated

=== Top scorers ===
Scorer	Team	Goals
(Scotland) Gareth Hutchison	Berwick Rangers	22
(Scotland) Paul Tosh	Forfar Athletic	19
(Scotland) Brian McPhee	Hamilton Academical	18
(Scotland) Brian Carrigan	Hamilton Academical	15
(England) Peter Weatherson	Greenock Morton	15
(Scotland) Alex Williams	Greenock Morton	15
(Republic of Ireland) Owen Coyle	Airdrie United	13
(Scotland) Ross Hamilton	Alloa Athletic	13
(Scotland) Gary McCutcheon	Berwick Rangers	12
(Scotland) Alan Gow	Airdrie United	11
(Scotland) Kenny Deuchar	East Fife	11
(Scotland) Ian Little	Alloa Athletic	11

== Scottish Third Division ==
=== League standings ===
Pos	Team	Pld	W	D	L	GF	GA	GD	Pts	Promotion
1	Stranraer (C, P)	36	24	7	5	87	30	+57	79	Promotion to the Second Division
2	Stirling Albion (P)	36	23	8	5	78	27	+51	77	Promotion to the Second Division
3	Gretna	36	20	8	8	59	39	+20	68	
4	Peterhead	36	18	7	11	67	37	+30	61	
5	Cowdenbeath	36	15	10	11	46	39	+7	55	
6	Montrose	36	12	12	12	52	63	−11	48	
7	Queen's Park	36	10	11	15	41	53	−12	41	
8	Albion Rovers	36	12	4	20	66	75	−9	40	
9	Elgin City	36	6	7	23	48	93	−45	25	
10	East Stirlingshire	36	2	2	32	30	118	−88	8	

Source: "2003-2004 Third Division - SPFL Archive". SPFL.
Rules for classification: 1) points; 2) goal difference; 3) number of goals scored.
(C) Champions; (P) Promoted

=== Top scorers ===
Scorer	Goals	Team
(Scotland) Michael Moore	24	Stranraer
(Scotland) Scott McLean	21	Stirling Albion
(Scotland) David Graham	18	Stranraer
(Scotland) Martin Johnston	18	Peterhead
(Scotland) Paul McManus	18	Albion Rovers
(Scotland) Martin Cameron	17	Gretna
(Scotland) Martin Bavidge	16	Peterhead
(Scotland) Alex Bone	15	Elgin City
(Scotland) Scott Michie	13	Montrose
(Scotland) Dene Shields	12	Cowdenbeath

== See also ==
- 2003–04 in Scottish football
