= Emir Tombul =

Turkish footballer

Personal information
- Full name: Emir Can Tombul
- Date of birth: 4 January 2001 (age 25)
- Place of birth: Istanbul, Turkey
- Height: 1.93 m (6 ft 4 in)
- Position: Centre-back

Team information
- Current team: FC Vysočina
- Number: 99

Youth career
- –2018: Rapperswil-Jona
- 2018–2019: Grasshoppers
- 2019–2021: Lommel
- 2020–2021: → Vitória Guimarães (loan)

Senior career*
| Years | Team | Apps | (Gls) |
| 2021 | New York Red Bulls II | 30 | (0) |
| 2022 | Wil | 4 | (0) |
| 2022 | Wil II | 3 | (0) |
| 2022–2023 | YF Juventus | 14 | (1) |
| 2023- | FC Vysočina Jihlava | | |
- * Club domestic league appearances and goals as of 16:38, 23 February 2026 (UTC)

Emir Can Tombul (born 4 January 2001) is a Turkish footballer who plays as a centre-back for FC Vysočina Jihlava.

== Career ==
=== Early career ===
Tombul played with the academy sides of Rapperswil-Jona, Grasshoppers, Lommel and a loan spell with Vitória de Guimarães, where he made 6 appearances for Vitória SC B in the Liga Revelação U-23.

=== New York Red Bulls II ===
On 27 April 2021, Tombul signed with USL Championship side New York Red Bulls II. He made his debut on 30 April 2021, starting in a 3–2 loss to Hartford Athletic. Following the 2021 season, Tombul's contract option was declined by New York.

=== Later career ===
For the first six months of 2022, Tombul played for FC Wil. After a trial at Turkish side Sakaryaspor, Tombul signed with Young Fellows Juventus in September 2022. In June 2023, Tombul went on a trial at Czech club FC Vysočina Jihlava.
