= Arnau Riera =

Spanish footballer (born 1981)

Personal information
- Full name: Arnau Caldenteny Riera
- Date of birth: 1 October 1981 (age 45)
- Place of birth: Manacor, Spain
- Height: 1.74 m (5 ft 9 in)
- Position: Midfielder

Youth career
- Manacor
- Mallorca

Senior career*
| Years | Team | Apps | (Gls) |
| 1999–2001 | Mallorca | 0 | (0) |
| 1999–2001 | → Ferriolense (loan) | | |
| 2001 | → Mataró (loan) | | |
| 2001–2002 | Barcelona C | 1 | (0) |
| 2001–2006 | Barcelona B | 143 | (526) |
| 2006–2009 | Sunderland | 1 | (0) |
| 2006–2007 | → Southend United (loan) | 2 | (0) |
| 2007–2008 | → Falkirk (loan) | 19 | (1) |
| 2008–2009 | → Falkirk (loan) | 17 | (0) |
| 2009–2010 | Atlético Baleares | | |
| 2011–2012 | Manacor | 18 | (1) |
- * Club domestic league appearances and goals as of 30 June 2012

Arnau Caldenteny Riera (/ˈɑːrnaʊ/; born 1 October 1981) is a Spanish former professional footballer who played as a midfielder.

== Early career ==
Riera was born in Manacor, Mallorca. He played for Real Mallorca's youth team aged 18 and played for Balearic Island selection U17 when they were champions of Spain. Aged 18, he moved to Mataro (on loan from Mallorca) in Spain's Second Division B. A year later he moved to FC Barcelona B where he was an ever present in the side which won the league in 2001. He stayed with the B-team until 2006 and trained with the first team in Peralada in 2004. He was Lionel Messi's captain for the 2004–05 and 2005–06 seasons.

== Senior career ==
Riera made substitute appearances for the Barcelona first team in 2004–05. He also played with the first team in friendlies against Marseille 2004–05, China 2003–04, Shaktar Donetsk 2003–04.

On 10 August 2006, Riera signed for Sunderland, and made his debut in the 3–1 defeat to Southend United at Roots Hall on 19 August 2006. He played well in his debut game, but was sent off just three minutes into the following match, a League Cup match against Bury which Sunderland lost 2–0 at Gigg Lane. And although signed to Sunderland for three more years, he never played for them again.

Whilst signed to Sunderland, Riera joined Southend United on a month's loan, the team against which he made his Sunderland debut. He also joined Scottish Premier League side Falkirk on a season-long loan, on 17 July 2007. At Falkirk he scored twice; once in a 7–2 defeat to Rangers and once in a Scottish Cup tie against Aberdeen. He joined Blackpool for a week's trial in July 2008, which he left prematurely. Riera eventually rejoined Falkirk on another season-long loan.

He was finally released by Sunderland on 28 May 2009.

He currently resides in his hometown and runs a hotel.
