= William Mocquet =

French footballer (born 1983)

Personal information
- Full name: William Mocquet
- Date of birth: 23 January 1983 (age 43)
- Place of birth: Valognes, France
- Height: 1.78 m (5 ft 10 in)
- Position: Right winger

Team information
- Current team: AS Moulins
- Number: 9

Senior career*
Years	Team	Apps	(Gls)
2001–2006	Le Havre	59	(2)
2005–2006	→ Louhans-Cuiseaux (loan)	25	(4)
2006–2007	Sunderland	0	(0)
2006–2007	→ Rochdale (loan)	7	(1)
2007	→ Bury (loan)	9	(0)
2007–2008	FC Pau		
2008–	AS Moulins		

International career
- France U-21
- * Club domestic league appearances and goals as of 21:03, 9 May 2007 (UTC)

William Mocquet (born 23 January 1983) is a French former footballer. Mocquet, who was capped for the French Under-21 side, played as a midfielder.

Mocquet left Le Havre and signed for Sunderland on 22 August 2006 for an undisclosed fee, in a two-year deal. However, he found himself on the sidelines and was loaned to League Two sides Rochdale (where he scored once against Boston United) and Bury. He was released at the end of the 2006-07 season.
