= 2000–01 Scottish Football League =

Scottish football season

Statistics of the Scottish Football League in season 2000–01.

== Scottish First Division ==
Pos	Team	Pld	W	D	L	GF	GA	GD	Pts	Promotion or relegation
1	Livingston (C, P)	36	23	7	6	72	31	+41	76	Promotion to the Premier League
2	Ayr United	36	19	12	5	73	41	+32	69	
3	Falkirk	36	16	8	12	57	59	−2	56	
4	Inverness CT	36	14	12	10	71	54	+17	54	
5	Clyde	36	11	14	11	44	46	−2	47	
6	Ross County	36	11	10	15	48	52	−4	43	
7	Raith Rovers	36	10	8	18	41	55	−14	38	
8	Airdrieonians	36	8	14	14	49	67	−18	38	
9	Greenock Morton (R)	36	9	8	19	34	61	−27	35	Relegation to the Second Division
10	Alloa Athletic (R)	36	7	11	18	38	61	−23	32	Relegation to the Second Division

Source: "2000-2001 First Division - SPFL Archive". SPFL.
Rules for classification: 1) points; 2) goal difference; 3) number of goals scored.
(C) Champions; (P) Promoted; (R) Relegated

== Scottish Second Division ==
Pos	Team	Pld	W	D	L	GF	GA	GD	Pts	Promotion or relegation
1	Partick Thistle (C, P)	36	22	9	5	66	32	+34	75	Promotion to the First Division
2	Arbroath (P)	36	15	13	8	54	38	+16	58	Promotion to the First Division
3	Berwick Rangers	36	14	12	10	51	44	+7	54	
4	Stranraer	36	15	9	12	51	50	+1	54	
5	Clydebank	36	12	11	13	42	43	−1	47	
6	Queen of the South	36	13	7	16	52	59	−7	46	
7	Stenhousemuir	36	12	6	18	45	63	−18	42	
8	Forfar Athletic	36	10	10	16	48	52	−4	40	
9	Queens Park (R)	36	10	10	16	28	40	−12	40	Relegation to the Third Division
10	Stirling Albion (R)	36	5	17	14	34	50	−16	32	Relegation to the Third Division

Source: "2000-2001 Second Division - SPFL Archive". SPFL.
Rules for classification: 1) points; 2) goal difference; 3) number of goals scored.
(C) Champions; (P) Promoted; (R) Relegated

== Scottish Third Division ==
Pos	Team	Pld	W	D	L	GF	GA	GD	Pts	Promotion
1	Hamilton Academical (C, P)	36	22	10	4	75	41	+34	76	Promotion to the Second Division
2	Cowdenbeath (P)	36	23	7	6	58	31	+27	76	Promotion to the Second Division
3	Brechin City	36	22	6	8	71	36	+35	72	
4	East Fife	36	15	8	13	49	46	+3	53	
5	Peterhead	36	13	10	13	46	46	0	49	
6	Dumbarton	36	13	6	17	46	49	−3	45	
7	Albion Rovers	36	12	9	15	38	43	−5	45	
8	East Stirlingshire	36	10	7	19	37	69	−32	37	
9	Montrose	36	6	8	22	31	65	−34	26	
10	Elgin City	36	5	7	24	29	65	−36	22	

Source: "2000-2001 Third Division - SPFL Archive". SPFL (in Malay).
Rules for classification: 1) points; 2) goal difference; 3) number of goals scored.
(C) Champions; (P) Promoted

== See also ==
- 2000–01 in Scottish football
