= Christian Gómez (Venezuelan footballer) =

Venezuelan footballer (born 1999)

Personal information
- Full name: Christian Anthony Gómez Vargas
- Date of birth: February 23, 1999 (age 27)
- Place of birth: Puerto Ordaz, Venezuela
- Height: 5 ft 6 in (1.68 m)
- Position: Defensive midfielder

Team information
- Current team: Mineros de Guayana
- Number: 8

Youth career
- –2017: Mineros de Guayana

Senior career*
Years	Team	Apps	(Gls)
2017–2020	Mineros de Guayana	39	(2)
2018	→ Atlético San Francisco (loan)		
2021	Hartford Athletic	15	(0)
2022–2024	Angostura F.C.	48	(0)
2025–	Mineros de Guayana	0	(0)
- * Club domestic league appearances and goals as of 22:19, 26 April 2022 (UTC)

Christian Anthony Gómez Vargas (born 23 February 1999) is a Venezuelan professional footballer who plays as a midfielder. He currently plays for Mineros de Guayana.

== Career ==
Gómez was part of the Mineros de Guayana from 2017 to 2021, making 44 appearances for the club, scoring 2 goals. He also helped the team to the Copa Venezuela title in 2017. In 2018 he spent a season on loan with Dominican side Atlético San Francisco, where the team were runners up in the league.

On 16 March 2021, Gómez signed with USL Championship side Hartford Athletic. He made his debut for Hartford on 13 June 2021, appearing as a 62nd-minute substitute during a 3–2 loss to Charlotte Independence.

== Honours ==
=== Club ===
Mineros

- Copa Venezuela: 2017
