= 2017 Colorado Springs Switchbacks FC season =

Colorado Springs Switchbacks FC
2017 season
- President: Nick Ragain
- Head coach: Steve Trittschuh
- Stadium: Weidner Field; Colorado Springs, Colorado (Capacity: 5,000)
- USL: Conference: 9th
- 2017 USL Playoffs: Did not qualify
- 2017 U.S. Open Cup: Third Round
- Biggest win: OC 0–4 COL (8/8)
- Biggest defeat: SLC 5–2 COL (5/20)
Home colors	Away colors

The 2017 Colorado Springs Switchbacks FC season was the club's third year of existence, and their third season in the Western Conference of the United Soccer League, the second tier of the United States Soccer Pyramid. On February 14, 2017, the Colorado Springs Switchbacks FC officially announced Weidner Apartment Homes had acquired the naming rights to the Switchbacks Stadium which has been rebranded as "Weidner Field". The team's mascot is Ziggy, who is a mountain goat.

== Roster ==
As of September 3, 2017

No.	Position	Nation	Player
1	GK	CMR	Moise Pouaty
2	DF	USA	Josh Phillips
3	DF	CMR	Pascal Eboussi
4	MF	USA	Luke Vercollone
5	DF	USA	Josh Suggs
6	MF	USA	Davy Armstrong
8	MF	USA	Eddy Prugh
9	MF	USA	Damen Marcu
10	MF	CAN	Masta Kacher
11	FW	JAM	Kevaughn Frater (on loan from Harbour View)
12	GK	CRC	Dan Jackson
13	DF	MEX	Diego Gutiérrez
14	MF	USA	Rony Argueta
16	DF	ENG	Jake Cawsey
17	DF	JAM	Sean McFarlane
18	FW	USA	Aaron King
22	FW	USA	Connor Bevans
23	FW	GUM	Shane Malcolm
24	FW	NGA	Tobenna Uzo
29	GK	USA	Justin Luthy
33	FW	USA	Shawn Chin
35	MF	KOR	Kim Tae-seong
36	FW	USA	Akwafei Ajeakwa
44	DF	USA	Jordan Burt
77	DF	USA	Jack Jones

== Competitions ==
=== Preseason ===
February 22, 2017 1	Colorado Rapids Academy	1–3	Colorado Springs Switchbacks FC	Commerce City, Colorado
18:30 (MDT)	1st half'	Final	Malcolm 1st half' James 1st half' King 2nd half'	Stadium: Dick's Sporting Goods Park Field #8

February 25, 2017 2	Real Colorado	1–1	Colorado Springs Switchbacks FC	Highlands Ranch, Colorado
11:00	2nd half'	Final	King 1st half'	Stadium: Heritage Park

March 4, 2017 3	Colorado Springs Switchbacks FC	5–2	Air Force Falcons	Colorado Springs, Colorado
13:00 (MDT)				Stadium: Weidner Field; Attendance: Closed door

March 8, 2017 4	CSU–Pueblo ThunderWolves	1–3	Colorado Springs Switchbacks FC	Pueblo, Colorado
17:30 (MDT)				Stadium: Art & Lorraine Soccer/Lacrosse Stadium

March 11, 2017 5	Colorado Springs Switchbacks FC	3–1	UCCS Mountain Lions	Colorado Springs, Colorado
13:00 (MDT)				Stadium: Weidner Field

March 15, 2017 6	Colorado Mines Orediggers	0–4	Colorado Springs Switchbacks FC	Golden, Colorado
16:00 (MDT)				Stadium: Stermole Soccer Stadium

March 18, 2017 7	Colorado Springs Switchbacks FC	4–0	Harpo's FC	Colorado Springs, Colorado
19:00 (MDT)		Report		Stadium: Weidner Field

=== USL Regular season ===
==== Standings ====
Pos	Team	Pld	W	D	L	GF	GA	GD	Pts	Qualification
7	Tulsa Roughnecks	32	14	4	14	46	49	−3	46	Conference Playoffs
8	Sacramento Republic	32	13	7	12	45	43	+2	46	Conference Playoffs
9	Colorado Springs Switchbacks	32	12	8	12	55	51	+4	44	
10	Orange County SC	32	11	10	11	43	47	−4	43	
11	Rio Grande Valley Toros	32	9	8	15	37	50	−13	35	

Source: 2017 USL standings
Rules for classification: 1) total wins; 2) total goal differential; 3) total goals scored; 4) points earned against top four Conference finishers; 5) disciplinary points; 6) coin toss or drawing of lots

==== Matches ====
Win Draw Loss Upcoming fixture

March 25, 2017 USL 1	Tulsa Roughnecks FC	0–3 (Forfeit)	Colorado Springs Switchbacks FC	Tulsa, Oklahoma
6:00 P.M.(MDT)	Caffa 24'; Svantesson 32', 51'; Ugarte 78'	COL Report	Malcolm 17'	Stadium: ONEOK Field; Attendance: 4,952; Referee: A. Musashe
Note: Match forfeited after it was discovered the Roughnecks played Paris Gee, who was an ineligible player. Tulsa won the original match 4–1.

April 1, 2017 USL 2	Colorado Springs Switchbacks FC	1–1	Oklahoma City Energy FC	Colorado Springs, Colorado
6:00 P.M.(MDT)	Kacher 20'	Report	Dixon 26'	Stadium: Weidner Field; Attendance: 2,032; Referee: Y. Marrakchi

April 7, 2017 USL 3	San Antonio FC	1–1	Colorado Springs Switchbacks FC	San Antonio, Texas
6:00 P.M. (MDT)	Tyrpak 79'	Report	King 12'	Stadium: Toyota Field; Attendance: 6,217; Referee: P. Trejo

April 12, 2017 USL 4	Rio Grande Valley FC Toros	3–1	Colorado Springs Switchbacks FC	Edinburg, Texas
6:00 P.M. (MDT)	Rodríguez 18', 44'; Monroy 64'	Report	James 46'	Stadium: H-E-B Park; Attendance: 5,481; Referee: W. Hale

April 15, 2017 USL 5	Colorado Springs Switchbacks FC	2–1	Real Monarchs SLC	Colorado Springs, Colorado
6:00 P.M. (MDT)	Kacher 15'; King 19'	Report	Velasquez 60'	Stadium: Weidner Field; Attendance: 3,249; Referee: C. Street

April 22, 2017 USL 6	Reno 1868 FC	2–2	Colorado Springs Switchbacks FC	Reno, NV
8:00 P.M. (MDT)	Burgos 45'; Murrell 60'	Report	Burt 58'; Malcolm 90+1'	Stadium: Greater Nevada Field; Attendance: 4,881; Referee: M. Badawi

April 29, 2017 USL 7	Colorado Springs Switchbacks FC	2–3	Seattle Sounders FC 2	Colorado Springs, Colorado
6:00 P.M. (MDT)	Perez 40'; Burt 70'	Report	Parra 21'; Chenkam 51', 54'	Stadium: Weidner Field; Attendance: 1,482; Referee: V. Rivas

May 5, 2017 USL 8	Colorado Springs Switchbacks FC	3–0	Tulsa Roughnecks FC	Colorado Springs, Colorado
7:00 P.M. (MDT)	Kacher 2', 69'; Malcolm 27'	Report		Stadium: Weidner Field; Attendance: 3,404; Referee: G. Dopka

May 10, 2017 USL 9	Portland Timbers 2	0–0	Colorado Springs Switchbacks FC	Portland, Oregon
12:00 P.M. (MDT)		Report		Stadium: Merlo Field; Attendance: 7,277; Referee: B. Toledo

May 14, 2017 USL 10	Vancouver Whitecaps FC 2	3–1	Colorado Springs Switchbacks FC	Vancouver, BC
4:00 P.M. (MDT)	Bustos 24'; Amanda 68'; Serban 82'	Report	McFarlane 88'	Stadium: Thunderbird Stadium; Attendance: 410; Referee: D. Barrie

May 20, 2017 USL 11	Real Monarchs SLC	5–2	Colorado Springs Switchbacks FC	Salt Lake City, Utah
7"00 P.M. (MDT)	Hoffman 30', 54'; Velasquez 51', 57'; Haber 83'	Report	Suggs 25'; Frater 87'	Stadium: Rio Tinto Stadium; Attendance: 2,209; Referee: J. Dickerson

May 27, 2017 USL 12	Colorado Springs Switchbacks FC	3–3	Reno 1868 FC	Colorado Springs, Colorado
6:00 P.M. (MDT)	King 50'; Burt 57', 88'	Report	Hoppenot 37', 85'; Kelly 42'	Stadium: Weidner Field; Attendance: 3,046; Referee: R. Touchan

June 3, 2017 USL 13	Colorado Springs Switchbacks FC	1–0	Oklahoma City Energy FC	Colorado Springs, Colorado
6:00 P.M. (MDT)	Argueta 90+3'	Report		Stadium: Weidner Field; Attendance: 3,606; Referee: L. Guardia

June 10, 2017 USL 14	LA Galaxy II	1–2	Colorado Springs Switchbacks FC	Los Angeles, California
8:30 P.M. (MDT)	Dhillon 80'	Report	Frater 65', 90'	Stadium: StubHub Center; Attendance: 1,214; Referee: F. Dadkho

June 21, 2017 USL 15	Swope Park Rangers	2–1	Colorado Springs Switchbacks FC	Kansas City, Missouri
6:30 P.M. (MDT)	Doyle 67'; Duke 75'	Report	Prugh 23'	Stadium: Swope Soccer Village; Attendance: 914; Referee: I. Pekmic

June 24, 2017 USL 16	Colorado Springs Switchbacks FC	1–0	San Antonio FC	Colorado Springs, Colorado
7:00 P.M. (MDT)	McFarlane 45+3'	Report		Stadium: Weidner Field; Attendance: 4,429; Referee: M. Badawi

July 1, 2017 USL 17	Colorado Springs Switchbacks FC	0–1	Rio Grande Valley FC Toros	Colorado Springs, Colorado
7:00 P.M. (MDT)		Report	Luna 67'	Stadium: Weidner Field; Attendance: 3,621; Referee: M. Radchuk

July 8, 2017 USL 18	Colorado Springs Switchbacks FC	2–2	Vancouver Whitecaps FC 2	Colorado Springs, Colorado
6:00 P.M. (MDT)	Kacher 48'; Frater 58'	Report	Bustos 38'; Sanner 43'	Stadium: Weidner Field; Attendance: 3,962; Referee: R. Hullner

July 15, 2017 USL 19	Phoenix Rising FC	2–1	Colorado Springs Switchbacks FC	Scottsdale, Arizona
8:30 P.M. (MDT)	Johnson 66', 84'	Report	Frater 12'	Stadium: Phoenix Rising FC Soccer Complex; Attendance: 5,605; Referee: D. Radford

July 22, 2017 USL 20	Oklahoma City Energy FC	4–3	Colorado Springs Switchbacks FC	Oklahoma City, OK
6:30 P.M. (MDT)	González 39', 51'; Angulo 45+1', 60'	Report	Burt 25', 64'; Frater 72'	Stadium: Taft Stadium; Attendance: 3,283; Referee: J. Lara

July 29, 2017 USL 21	Colorado Springs Switchbacks FC	2–1	Seattle Sounders FC 2	Colorado Springs, Colorado
6:00 P.M. (MDT)	Malcolm 21'; Narbón 33' (o.g.)	Report	Mathers 51'	Stadium: Weidner Field; Attendance: 4,042; Referee: M. Badawi

August 5, 2017 USL 22	Colorado Springs Switchbacks FC	4–1	Portland Timbers 2	Colorado Springs, Colorado
6:00 P.M. (MDT)	Malcolm 13'; Suggs 18'; Frater 34'; Kacher 51'	Report	Bevans 89' (o.g.)	Stadium: Weidner Field; Attendance: 3,623; Referee: M. Urbina-Barrios

August 8, 2017 USL 23	Orange County SC	0–4	Colorado Springs Switchbacks FC	Irvine, California
8:30 P.M. (MDT)		Report	Vercollone 19'; Malcolm 22'; Kacher 39'; Frater 72'	Stadium: Anteater Stadium; Attendance: 1,553; Referee: T. Ford

August 12, 2017 USL 24	Real Monarchs SLC	2–0	Colorado Springs Switchbacks FC	Salt Lake City, Utah
7:00 P.M. (MDT)	Hoffman 2'; Moberg 14'	Report		Stadium: Rio Tinto Stadium; Attendance: 2,385; Referee: J. Dickerson

August 18, 2017 USL 25	Colorado Springs Switchbacks FC	1–2	LA Galaxy II	Colorado Springs, Colorado
7:00 P.M. (MDT)	King 77'	Report	Lassiter 52'; McFarlane 87' (o.g.)	Stadium: Weidner Field; Attendance: 4,437; Referee: E. Koroleva

September 2, 2017 USL 26	Sacramento Republic FC	2–2	Colorado Springs Switchbacks FC	Sacramento, California
8:30 P.M. (MDT)	Cararez 37'; Wiesenfarth 45+2'	Report	Vercollone 38'; Ebossi 90+1'	Stadium: Bonney Field; Attendance: 11,569; Referee: M. Radchuk

September 9, 2017 USL 27	Colorado Springs Switchbacks FC	1–2	Phoenix Rising FC	Colorado Springs, Colorado
6:00 P.M. (MDT)	Ajekwa 83'	Report	Dia 50'; Gray 86'	Stadium: Weidner Field; Attendance: 3,582; Referee: M. Allatin

September 16, 2017 USL 28	Seattle Sounders FC 2	1–1	Colorado Springs Switchbacks FC	Seattle, Washington
8:00 P.M. (MDT)	Wingo 21'	Report	Jones 45'	Stadium: Starfire Sports Complex; Attendance: 1,004; Referee: B. Oakley

September 23, 2017 USL 29	Colorado Springs Switchbacks FC	1–3	Swope Park Rangers	Colorado Springs, Colorado
6:00 P.M. (MDT)	Eboussi 90+2'	Report	Ballo 20'; Belmar 20'; Selbol 22'	Stadium: Weidner Field; Attendance: 2,788; Referee: L. Szpala

September 30, 2017 USL 30	Colorado Springs Switchbacks FC	2–1	Orange County SC	Colorado Springs, Colorado
6:00 P.M. (MDT)	Kim 22'; Frater 28'	Report	Parra 55'	Stadium: Weidner Field; Attendance: 3,059; Referee: J. Meyer

October 7, 2017 USL 31	Colorado Springs Switchbacks FC	1–0	Sacramento Republic FC	Colorado Springs, Colorado
6:00 P.M. (MDT)	Frater 36'	Report		Stadium: Weidner Field; Attendance: 3,860; Referee: Y. Marrakchi

October 14, 2017 USL 32	Tulsa Roughnecks FC	2–4	Colorado Springs Switchbacks FC	Tulsa, Oklahoma
6:00 P.M. (MDT)	Ayala 29'; Thierjung 35'	Report	Frater 38', 66'; Burt 45', 46'	Stadium: ONEOK Field; Attendance: 3,188; Referee: E. Tattersall

Schedule source

=== U.S. Open Cup ===
The Switchbacks beat FC Tucson 2–0 in the second round of the U.S. Open Cup on Wednesday, May 17, 2017. The Switchbacks' goals were scored by Jun Gyeong Park and Kevaughn Frater.

The Switchbacks lost to OKC Energy FC 2–1 in the third round of the U.S. Open Cup on Wednesday, May 31, 2017. The Switchbacks' goal was scored by Jordan Burt.

May 27, 2017 Second Round	Switchbacks FC (Colorado)	2–0	(Arizona) FC Tucson	Colorado Springs, Colorado
6:00 P.M. (MDT)	Park 47'; Frater 49'; Kim (yellow card) 76'; Cawsey (yellow card) 88'	Report	Solabarrieta (yellow card) 26'; Polster (yellow card) 41'	Stadium: Weidner Field; Referee: Chris Greer

May 31, 2017 Third Round	Switchbacks FC (Colorado)	1–2	(Oklahoma) OKC Energy FC	Colorado Springs, Colorado
8:00 PM CDT	Burt (yellow card) 28'; Cawsey (yellow card) 69'; Burt 90+1' (pen.)	Report	Barril 72'; Wojcik 83'; González (yellow card) 90+2'	Stadium: Weidner Field; Attendance: 1,222; Referee: Karen Abt
