= 2018 Colorado Springs Switchbacks FC season =

Colorado Springs Switchbacks FC
2018 season
- President: Nick Ragain
- Head coach: Steve Trittschuh
- Stadium: Weidner Field; Colorado Springs, Colorado (Capacity: 5,000)
- USL: Conference: 11th
- 2018 USL Playoffs: Did not qualify
- 2018 U.S. Open Cup: Third Round
- Highest home attendance: All: 5,000 (June 23 vs. Fresno FC)
- Lowest home attendance: League: 941 (July 14 vs. Sacramento Republic FC); All: 135 (May 16 vs. FC Denver)
- Average home league attendance: 4,050

The 2018 Colorado Springs Switchbacks FC season was the club's fourth year of existence, and their fourth season in the Western Conference of the United Soccer League, the second tier of the United States Soccer Pyramid. On January 26, 2018 it was announced that the Colorado Pride Switchbacks U23 will join the Premier Development League’s Mountain Division for the upcoming 2018 season as the PDL partner of the USL’s Colorado Springs Switchbacks FC.

== Players ==
As of February 22, 2018

No.	Position	Nation	Player
1	GK	CMR	Moise Pouaty
3	DF	CMR	Pascal Eboussi
4	MF	USA	Luke Vercollone
5	DF	USA	Josh Suggs
6	DF	USA	Taylor Hunter
7	MF	FIN	Verneri Välimaa
8	DF	TRI	Jamal Jack
9	FW	NIR	Marty Maybin
11	MF	JAM	Saeed Robinson
12	GK	HAI	Steward Ceus
14	FW	USA	Akwafei Ajeakwa
15	DF	CMR	Ayukokata També
19	MF	USA	Uriel Macias
22	MF	CAN	Jordan Schweitzer
23	FW	GUM	Shane Malcolm
24	FW	NGA	Tobenna Uzo
35	MF	KOR	Kim Tae-seong
44	DF	USA	Jordan Burt

== Competitions ==
=== USL ===
March 17, 2018 USL 1	Colorado Springs Switchbacks FC	2–0	LA Galaxy II	Colorado Springs, Colorado
6:00 P.M.(MDT)	Ajeakwa 25'; Burt 55' (pen.); Schweitzer (yellow card) 57'; Kim (yellow card) 73'	COS Report; USL Report	Arellano (yellow card) 57'; Hilliard-Arce (yellow card) 58'	Stadium: Weidner Field; Attendance: 3,023; Referee: Greg Dopka

March 24, 2018 USL 2	Colorado Springs Switchbacks FC	0–1	Portland Timbers 2	Colorado Springs, Colorado
6:00 P.M. (MDT)	Kim (yellow card) 35'; Välimaa (yellow card) 89'	COS Report; USL Report	Mulligan (yellow card) 58'; Phillips (yellow card) 73'; Williams 82'; Arboleda (yellow card) 90+1'	Stadium: Weidner Field; Attendance: 2,591; Referee: Kevin Stott

March 31, 2018 USL 3	Saint Louis FC	1–0	Colorado Springs Switchbacks FC	Fenton, Missouri
4:00 PM (CST)	Greig 5'; Barden (yellow card) 9'; Fink (yellow card) 39'	Report	Kim (yellow card) 11'; Ajeakwa (yellow card) 33'	Stadium: World Wide Technology Soccer Park; Attendance: 4,034; Referee: Javier Santos

April 4, 2018 USL 4	Swope Park Rangers	1–0	Colorado Springs Switchbacks FC	Overland Park, Kansas
6:30 P.M. (MDT)	Blackwood 7'; Barry (yellow card) 58'; Silva (yellow card) 90+2'; Rubio (yellow card) 90+3'	COS Report; USL Report	Malcolm (yellow card) 69'	Stadium: Shawnee Mission District Stadium; Attendance: 737; Referee: Guido Gonzalez Jr.

April 7, 2018 USL 5	Colorado Springs Switchbacks FC	2–1	Rio Grande Valley FC Toros	Colorado Springs, Colorado
6:00 P.M. (MDT)	Suggs 63'; Burt 70' (pen.); Kim (yellow card) 90+3'	COS Report; USL Report	Quintailla 80'; Ontiveros (yellow card) 83'	Stadium: Weidner Field; Attendance: 2,632; Referee: L. Szpala

April 14, 2018 USL 6	Reno 1868 FC	0–4	Colorado Springs Switchbacks FC	Reno, Nevada
8:00 P.M. (MDT)	Felipe Fernandes (yellow card) 17'; Griffiths (red card) 88'	COS Report; USL Report	Felipe Fernandes o.g' (18); Ajeakwa 25'; Ajeakwa (yellow card) 25'; Vercollone 47'; Uzo (yellow card) 56'; Jack 67'; Robinson (yellow card) 77'	Stadium: Greater Nevada Field; Attendance: 4,081; Referee: M. Allatin

April 18, 2018 USL 7	Sacramento Republic FC	2–1	Colorado Springs Switchbacks FC	Sacramento, California
8:30 P.M. (MDT)	Iwasa 64'; Bijev 73'; Moffat (yellow card) 79'; Hall (yellow card) 79'	COS Report; USL Report	Malcolm 28'; Burt (yellow card) 55'; Poaty (yellow card) 69'; Schweitzer (yellow card) 76'; Suggs (yellow card) 79'	Stadium: Papa Murphy's Park; Attendance: 11,569; Referee: L. Guardia

April 21, 2018 USL 8	Colorado Springs Switchbacks FC	0–0	Seattle Sounders FC 2	Colorado Springs, Colorado
6:00 P.M. (MDT)	Vercollone (yellow card) 49'; Vercollone (red card) 62'; També (yellow card) 80'	COS Report; USL Report	Saari (yellow card) 16'; Saari (red card) 59'	Stadium: Weidner Field; Attendance: 2,534; Referee: R. Mendoza

April 28, 2018 USL 9	Orange County SC	1–0	Colorado Springs Switchbacks FC	Orange County, California
8:00 P.M. (MDT)	Quinn 6' (pen.); Amico (yellow card) 8'; Crognale (yellow card) 90+3'	COS Report; USL Report	Ajeakwa (yellow card) 90+3'	Stadium: Orange County Great Park; Attendance: 3,742; Referee: M. Radchuk

May 5, 2018 USL 10	Colorado Springs Switchbacks FC	0–0	Reno 1868 FC	Colorado Springs, Colorado
6:00 P.M. (MDT)		COS Report	Murrell (yellow card) 80'	Stadium: Weidner Field; Attendance: 3,830; Referee: L. Varga

May 11, 2018 USL 11	Colorado Springs Switchbacks FC	1–0	Las Vegas Lights FC	Colorado Springs, Colorado
7:00 P.M. (MDT)	Vercollone 70'	COS Report; USL Report	Alvarez (yellow card) 53'; Jaime (yellow card) 65'; Alatorre (yellow card) 80'	Stadium: Weidner Field; Attendance: 4,039; Referee: A. Zarrin

May 19, 2018 USL 12	OKC Energy FC	1–0	Colorado Springs Switchbacks FC	Oklahoma City, Oklahoma
6:00 P.M. (MDT)	Ross 82'	Report	Schweitzer (yellow card) 73'; Suggs (yellow card) 85'; Uzo (yellow card) 90+1'	Stadium: Taft Stadium; Attendance: 5,347; Referee: Matthew Franz

May 26, 2018 USL 13	Colorado Springs Switchbacks FC	3–0	Saint Louis FC	Colorado Springs, Colorado
6:00 P.M. (MDT)	Vercollone 32' (pen.), 90+3'; Robinson 61'; Ceus (yellow card) 87'	Report	Stanley (yellow card) 35'	Stadium: Weidner Field; Attendance: 4,417; Referee: Chris Greer

June 2, 2018 USL 14	Las Vegas Lights FC	4–1	Colorado Springs Switchbacks FC	Las Vegas, Nevada
9:00 P.M. (MDT)	Alvarez 24'; Adu 47'; Thomas (yellow card) 52' (goal) 90+1'; Ochoa 58'	Report	Uzo (yellow card) 52'; Suggs 77'; Maybin (red card) 80'	Stadium: Cashman Field; Attendance: 5,712; Referee: Farhad Dadkho

June 9, 2018 USL 15	Colorado Springs Switchbacks FC	0–1	Swope Park Rangers	Colorado Springs, Colorado
6:00 P.M. (MDT)		Report	Barry 40'	Stadium: Weidner Field; Attendance: 4,086; Referee: Miguel Urbina-Barrios

June 17, 2018 USL 16	Portland Timbers 2	1–4	Colorado Springs Switchbacks FC	Portland, Oregon
3:00 P.M. (MDT)	Hanson 18'; Zambrano (yellow card) 36'; Phillips (yellow card) 49'	Report	Schweitzer (yellow card) 34'; Burt 51' 55'; Maybin 71'; Ajeakwa 79'; Hamilton (yellow card) 83'; Eboussi (yellow card) 86'	Stadium: Merlo Field; Attendance: 1,798; Referee: Chipalo Street

June 23, 2018 USL 17	Colorado Springs Switchbacks FC	1–0	Fresno FC	Colorado Springs, Colorado
7:00 P.M. (MDT)	Eboussi (yellow card) 50'; Malcolm 86'	Report		Stadium: Weidner Field; Attendance: 5,000; Referee: Oscar Arias Ochoa

June 30, 2018 USL 18	Colorado Springs Switchbacks FC	1–1	San Antonio FC	Colorado Springs, Colorado
6:00 P.M. (MDT)	Eboussi (yellow card) 7'; Burt 45+1' (pen.); Schweitzer (yellow card) 56'; Hanlin (yellow card) 70'	Report	Lopez (yellow card) 26'; Restrepo (yellow card) 45+1'; Castillo 66' (pen.); Guzmán (yellow card) 90+5'	Stadium: Weidner Field; Attendance: 3,879; Referee: Joe Wykowski

July 3, 2018 USL 19	Colorado Springs Switchbacks FC	0-1	Orange County SC	Colorado Springs, Colorado
7:00 P.M. (MDT)	Hall 58' (pen.); Turnley (yellow card) 80'; Moffat (yellow card) 81'	Report	Hashimoto (yellow card) 10'; Amico (yellow card) 26', (yellow card) 90+3' (red card); Kontor (yellow card) 32'; Juel-Nielsen (yellow card) 90+1'; Ramos-Godoy (yellow card) 90+2'	Stadium: Weidner Field; Attendance: 4,521; Referee: Adam Zarrin

July 7, 2018 USL 20	OKC Energy FC	1–1	Colorado Springs Switchbacks FC	Oklahoma City, Oklahoma
6:30 P.M. (MDT)	A. Dixon 16'; Atuahene (yellow card) 33'; Rasmussen (yellow card) 42'	Report	Malcolm 48'	Stadium: Taft Stadium; Attendance: 3,433; Referee: José Lara

July 14, 2018 USL 21	Colorado Springs Switchbacks FC	1–3	Sacramento Republic FC	Colorado Springs, Colorado
6:00 P.M. (MDT)	Barry 70'	Report	Iwasa 45', 54'; Eissele (yellow card) 67' (goal) 88'; Klimenta (yellow card) 73'	Stadium: Weidner Field; Attendance: 941; Referee: Rubiel Vazquez

July 21, 2018 USL 22	Colorado Springs Switchbacks FC	4–2	Tulsa Roughnecks FC	Colorado Springs, Colorado
6:00 P.M. (MDT)	Maybin 40', 70'; Burt 45' (pen.); Malcolm 87'	Report	Rivas 19'; Mirković (yellow card) 42'; Cerda (yellow card) 44'; Ceus 79' (o.g.); Ugarte (yellow card) 82'	Stadium: Weidner Field; Attendance: 4,029; Referee: Marco Villa

July 25, 2018 USL 23	San Antonio FC	1–0	Colorado Springs Switchbacks FC	San Antonio, Texas
6:30 P.M. (MDT)	Escalante (yellow card) 29'; Murphy 55'; King (yellow card) 85'	Report	Amoako (yellow card) 85'; Ajeakwa (red card) 90+4'	Stadium: Toyota Field; Attendance: 6,307; Referee: Matt Franz

July 28, 2018 USL 24	Rio Grande Valley FC Toros	1–0	Colorado Springs Switchbacks FC	Edinburg, Texas
6:30 P.M. (MDT)	Greene (yellow card) 46'; Perea (yellow card) 52'; Aguilar 83'	Report		Stadium: H-E-B Park; Attendance: 4,896; Referee: Arturo Ibarra

August 4, 2018 USL 25	Colorado Springs Switchbacks FC	2–0	OKC Energy FC	Colorado Springs, Colorado
6:00 P.M. (MDT)	Malcolm (yellow card) 69'; Uzo 74', (yellow card) 75'; Azira (yellow card) 80'; Malcolm 89'	Report	Beckie (yellow card) 52'	Stadium: Weidner Field; Attendance: 4,102; Referee: Adam Zarrin

August 11, 2018 USL 26	Tulsa Roughnecks FC	2–1	Colorado Springs Switchbacks FC	Tulsa, Oklahoma
6:30 P.M. (MDT)	Vukovic (yellow card) 17'; Gamble 55'; Rivas 71'	Report	Schweitzer (yellow card) 36'; Hunter 45'	Stadium: ONEOK Field; Attendance: 3,328; Referee: Michael Radchuk

August 25, 2018 USL 27	Phoenix Rising FC	4–0	Colorado Springs Switchbacks FC	Phoenix metropolitan area
8:30 P.M. (MDT)	Awako 68'; Farrell 74'; Cortez 80'; Frater 90+4'	Report	Burt (red card) 65'	Stadium: Phoenix Rising FC Soccer Complex; Attendance: 6,077; Referee: Sergii Demianchuk

August 29, 2018 USL 28	Colorado Springs Switchbacks FC	1–0	Real Monarchs	Colorado Springs, Colorado
7:00 P.M. (MDT)	Robinson 87'	Report	Mare (yellow card) 44'; Gallagher (yellow card) 78'	Stadium: Weidner Field; Attendance: 3,248; Referee: Joe Wykowsk

September 1, 2018 USL 29	LA Galaxy II	3–1	Colorado Springs Switchbacks FC	Carson, California
8:30 P.M. (MDT)	Hilliard-Arce 27'; Lassiter 29', 56'; Vera (yellow card) 81'	Report	Toye 11'; També (yellow card) 45+1'	Stadium: StubHub Center; Attendance: 1,683; Referee: Tim Ford

September 15, 2018 USL 30	Colorado Springs Switchbacks FC	1–1	Rio Grande Valley FC Toros	Colorado Springs, Colorado
6:00 P.M. (MDT)	Robinson 8'; També (yellow card) 35'	Report	Perea 71'	Stadium: Weidner Field; Attendance: 4,064; Referee: Adam Zarrin

September 22, 2018 USL 31	Colorado Springs Switchbacks FC	1–2	Phoenix Rising FC	Colorado Springs, Colorado
6:00 P.M. (MDT)	Jack (yellow card) 8'; Robinson 66'; També (yellow card) 71'	Report	Farrell 22'; Lambert 43'; Awako (yellow card) 63'; Musa (yellow card) 78'; Woszczynski (yellow card) 90+5'	Stadium: Weidner Field; Attendance: 4,871; Referee: Josh Willens

September 29, 2018 USL 32	Real Monarchs	0–2	Colorado Springs Switchbacks FC	Herriman, Utah
7:00 P.M. (MDT)	Kacher (yellow card) 53'; Ryden (yellow card) 90'	Report	Ajeakwa 63'; Maybin 90+1'	Stadium: Zions Bank Stadium; Attendance: 2,386; Referee: Elijio Arreguin

October 5, 2018 USL 33	Fresno FC	3–0	Colorado Springs Switchbacks FC	Fresno, California
8:00 P.M. (MDT)	Chaney 23'; Cooper 47'; Johnson (yellow card) 57', (goal) 71'	Report	Eboussi (yellow card) 25'	Stadium: Chukchansi Park; Attendance: 4,682; Referee: Lukasz Szpala

October 10, 2018 USL 34	Seattle Sounders FC 2	2–2	Colorado Springs Switchbacks FC	Tacoma, Washington
8:00 P.M. (MDT)	Neagle 45', (yellow card) 76'; Diaz 81'	Report	Hunter (yellow card) 33'; Robinson 51'; Malcolm 52'; Ajeakwa (yellow card) 61'	Stadium: Cheney Stadium; Referee: Michael Radchuk

=== Results summary ===
==== Standings ====
Pos	Team	Pld	W	D	L	GF	GA	GD	Pts
9	San Antonio FC	34	14	8	12	45	48	−3	50
10	OKC Energy FC	34	12	7	15	43	46	−3	43
11	Colorado Springs Switchbacks	34	11	6	17	36	39	−3	39
12	Fresno FC	34	9	12	13	44	38	+6	39
13	Rio Grande Valley Toros	34	8	14	12	36	42	−6	38

Source: 2018 USL standings
Rules for classification: 1) total wins; 2) total goal differential; 3) total goals scored; 4) points earned against top four Conference finishers; 5) disciplinary points; 6) coin toss or drawing of lots

=== U.S. Open Cup ===
May 16, 2018 Second round	Colorado Springs Switchbacks	3–2	(Colorado) FC Denver	Colorado Springs, Colorado
7:00 PM MDT	Eboussi 55'; Macias 58'; Burt 86' (pen.)	Report; SWbacks Report	Magallanes 36'; Castillo 77' (pen.)	Stadium: Weidner Field; Attendance: 135; Referee: Chris Greer

May 23, 2018 Third round	San Antonio FC (Texas)	1 – 1 (a.e.t.) (5 – 3 p)	Colorado Springs Switchbacks FC	San Antonio, Texas
7:30 p.m. CDT	Castillo 8' (pen.); McCarthy (yellow card) 89'	Report	Uzo 26'; Eboussi (yellow card) 58'; Robinson (yellow card) 104' (red card) 120'; Jack (yellow card) 120'	Stadium: Toyota Field; Attendance: 4,853; Referee: Elton Garcia
	Penalties
	Escalante (penalty scored); King (penalty scored); Rodriguez (penalty scored); Seth (penalty scored); Lopez (penalty scored)		(penalty scored) Vercollone; (penalty scored) Jack; (penalty scored) Suggs; (penalty missed) Macias
