= 2019 San Antonio FC season =

San Antonio FC
2019 season
- Owner: Spurs Sports & Entertainment
- Head coach: Darren Powell
- Stadium: Toyota Field
- USLC: Conference: 11th Overall: 20th
- USLC Playoffs: Did not qualify
- U.S. Open Cup: Third Round
- Copa Tejas: Runners-up
- Top goalscorer: League: Jack Barmby; Éver Guzmán; Frank López (8 goals); All: Jack Barmby; Éver Guzmán (9 goals)
- Highest home attendance: 8,406 vs Colorado Springs Switchbacks FC (October 19, 2019)
- Lowest home attendance: 4,702 vs Laredo Heat (May 14, 2019)
- Average home league attendance: 6,765
- Biggest win: 5–0 (August 24 vs. New Mexico United)
- Biggest defeat: 1–5 (August 30 at Tacoma Defiance)

The 2019 San Antonio FC season was the club's fourth season of existence. Including the San Antonio Thunder of the original NASL and the former San Antonio Scorpions of the modern NASL, this was the 10th season of professional soccer in San Antonio. The club played in the USL Championship, the second division of the United States soccer league system, and participated in the U.S. Open Cup.

== Club ==
=== Coaching staff ===
Position	Staff
Head coach	(England) Darren Powell
Assistant coach	(Canada) Alen Marcina
Assistant coach	(United States) Ryan Roushandel
Assistant coach / SAFC pro academy director	(Wales) Nick Evans
Assistant coach / director of goalkeeping	(Mexico) Juan Lamadrid
Athletic development coach	(United States) Frank Barone
Head athletic trainer	(United States) Adam Quigley
Team coordinator equipment manager	(United States) Rashad Moore

Source: San Antonio FC

=== Other information ===
Owner	(United States) Spurs Sports & Entertainment
Chairman	(United States) Julianna Hawn Holt
Managing Director	(United States) Tim Holt
Ground (capacity and dimensions)	Toyota Field (8,200 / 110x70 yards)
Training Ground	S.T.A.R. Soccer Complex

Source: San Antonio FC

== Squad information ==
=== First team squad ===
As of September 13, 2019.

Squad No.	Name	Nationality	Position(s)	Date of birth (age)
Goalkeepers
0	Matt Cardone	(United States)	GK	June 18, 1993 (age 33)
1	Jonathan Viscosi	(Canada)	GK	March 18, 1991 (age 35)
Defenders
2	Moises Hernandez	(Guatemala)	DF	March 5, 1992 (age 34)
3	Pascal Eboussi	(Cameroon)	DF	March 14, 1988 (age 38)
4	Joshua Yaro	(Ghana)	DF	November 18, 1994 (age 31)
6	Johnny Fenwick	(England)	DF	November 11, 1994 (age 31)
15	Ebenezer Ackon	(Ghana)	DF	February 12, 1996 (age 30)
31	Kai Greene	(United States)	DF	July 7, 1993 (age 33)
Midfielders
7	Lance Laing	(Jamaica)	MF	February 28, 1988 (age 38)
8	Pecka	(Brazil)	MF	May 2, 1989 (age 37)
10	Wálter Restrepo	(Colombia)	MF	June 1, 1988 (age 38)
11	Jack Barmby	(England)	MF	November 14, 1994 (age 31)
13	Michael Lahoud	(Sierra Leone)	MF	September 15, 1986 (age 40)
14	Leeroy Maguraushe	(Zimbabwe)	MF	January 11, 1996 (age 30)
16	Rafael Castillo	(Colombia)	MF	June 6, 1980 (age 46)
19	Cristian Parano	(Argentina)	MF	August 16, 1999 (age 27)
20	Brian Gómez	(Argentina)	MF	February 15, 1994 (age 32)
21	Leo Torres	(United States)	MF	January 22, 2004 (age 22)
27	Jose Gallegos	(United States)	MF	September 22, 2001 (age 25)
Forwards
9	Frank López	(Cuba)	FW	February 25, 1995 (age 31)
23	Tony Taylor	(Panama)	FW	July 13, 1989 (age 37)
70	Bradford Jamieson IV	(United States)	FW	October 18, 1996 (age 30)
99	Éver Guzmán	(Mexico)	FW	March 15, 1988 (age 38)

== Player movement ==
=== In ===
Pos	Player	Previous club	Fee	Date	Source
MF	(Jamaica) Lance Laing	(United States) FC Cincinnati	Undisclosed	November 15, 2018	
MF	(Colombia) Wálter Restrepo	(Colombia) Deportes Tolima	Undisclosed	November 20, 2018	
DF	(United States) Kai Greene	(United States) Rio Grande Valley FC Toros	Undisclosed	December 6, 2018	
DF	(Canada) Amer Didic	(United States) Sporting Kansas City	Undisclosed	December 18, 2018	
MF	(England) Jack Barmby	(United States) Portland Timbers	Undisclosed	December 24, 2018	
DF	(Ghana) Joshua Yaro	(United States) Philadelphia Union	Undisclosed	January 11, 2019	
GK	(Canada) Jonathan Viscosi	(Finland) TPS	Undisclosed	January 17, 2019	
DF	(England) Johnny Fenwick	(United States) High Point University	Undisclosed	January 18, 2019	
MF	(Zimbabwe) Leeroy Maguraushe	(United States) UNC Greensboro	Undisclosed	January 18, 2019	
MF	(Sierra Leone) Michael Lahoud	(United States) FC Cincinnati	Undisclosed	January 22, 2019	
MF	(Turks and Caicos Islands) Billy Forbes	(United States) Phoenix Rising FC	Undisclosed	January 23, 2019	
MF	(Argentina) Cristian Parano	(Argentina) San Martín de San Juan	Undisclosed	January 31, 2019	
DF	(Ghana) Ebenezer Ackon	(United States) Bowling Green State University	Undisclosed	February 1, 2019	
MF	(United States) Leo Torres	(United States) SAFC Pro Academy	Undisclosed	February 14, 2019	
MF	(Argentina) Brian Gómez	(Portugal) C.D. Feirense	Undisclosed	March 28, 2019	
MF	(United States) Jose Gallegos	(United States) SAFC Pro Academy	Undisclosed	April 25, 2019	
DF	(United States) Carson Price		Undisclosed	May 14, 2019	
GK	(United States) Joseph Batrouni		Undisclosed	June 21, 2019	
FW	(Panama) Tony Taylor	(Hungary) Puskás Akadémia FC	Undisclosed	September 13, 2019	

=== Out ===
Pos	Player	Transferred To	Fee	Date	Source
DF	(United States) Stephen McCarthy	Unattached	Retired	November 1, 2018	
MF	(United States) Sonny Guadarrama	(United States) Austin Bold FC	Undisclosed	November 6, 2018	
DF	(United States) Greg Cochrane	Unattached	Retired	November 8, 2018	
MF	(United States) Mikey Lopez	(United States) Birmingham Legion FC	Undisclosed	November 13, 2018	
DF	(United States) Darnell King	(United States) Nashville SC	Undisclosed	December 4, 2018	
DF	(United States) Ryan Felix	(United States) Tampa Bay Rowdies	Undisclosed	December 7, 2018	
DF	(Cameroon) Cyprian Hedrick	(United States) Tulsa Roughnecks FC	Undisclosed	December 17, 2018	
FW	(United States) Mike Seth	(United States) Colorado Springs Switchbacks FC	Undisclosed	January 4, 2019	
GK	(United States) Diego Restrepo	(United States) Austin Bold FC	Undisclosed	January 17, 2019	
MF	(England) Charlie Ward	(Canada) Ottawa Fury FC	Undisclosed	January 18, 2019	
DF	(United States) Ryan Roushandel	Joined coaching staff of San Antonio FC	Undisclosed	January 28, 2019	
FW	(United States) Kyle Murphy	(United States) Loudoun United FC	Undisclosed	February 21, 2019	
MF	(United States) Maxi Rodriguez	(United States) Richmond Kickers	Undisclosed	February 22, 2019	
FW	(Costa Rica) César Elizondo	(Costa Rica) Pérez Zeledón	Undisclosed		
MF	(United States) Connor Presley	(United States) Loudoun United FC	Undisclosed	March 6, 2019	
DF	(Canada) Amer Didic	(Canada) FC Edmonton	Undisclosed	April 15, 2019	
MF	(United States) Ethan Bryant	(Belgium) K.S.V. Roeselare	Undisclosed	August 26, 2019	
MF	(Turks and Caicos Islands) Billy Forbes	Unattached	Released	September 4, 2019	
DF	(United States) Carson Price	Unattached	Undisclosed		
GK	(United States) Joseph Batrouni	Unattached	Undisclosed		

=== Loan in ===
Pos	Player	Loaned From	Start	End	Source
DF	(Cameroon) Pascal Eboussi	(Czech Republic) MFK Vyškov	December 13, 2018	End of season	
FW	(Mexico) Jahir Barraza	(Mexico) Club Atlas	January 15, 2019	February 20, 2019	
FW	(United States) Bradford Jamieson IV	(United States) LA Galaxy	February 20, 2019	End of season	
DF	(Guatemala) Moises Hernandez	(United States) FC Dallas	March 21, 2019	End of season	
FW	(Cuba) Frank López	(United States) LA Galaxy II	July 15, 2019	End of season	

=== Loan out ===
Pos	Player	Loaned To	Start	End	Source
FW	(United States) Alex Bruce	(United States) Lansing Ignite FC	March 4, 2019	End of season	

== Pre-season ==
The pre-season matches were announced on January 14, 2019, by SAFC.

February 2, 2019	San Antonio FC	Cancelled	University of the Incarnate Word	San Antonio, Texas
11:00 AM CDT				Stadium: Toyota Field

February 9, 2019	FC Dallas	1 – 3	San Antonio FC	Frisco, Texas
4:00 PM CDT	Ondrášek 51'	Report	Forbes 8'; Didic 45'; Trialist 81'	Stadium: Toyota Soccer Center; Referee: Marcos De Oliveira

February 16, 2019	San Antonio FC	0 – 0	Saint Louis FC	San Antonio, Texas
11:00 AM CDT		Report		Stadium: Toyota Field; Attendance: Closed-door

February 16, 2019	San Antonio FC	1 – 0	Saint Louis FC	San Antonio, Texas
11:00 AM CDT	(o.g.)	Report		Stadium: Toyota Field; Attendance: Closed-door

February 23, 2019	San Antonio FC	0 – 0	El Paso Locomotive FC	San Antonio, Texas
7:00 PM CDT		Report	N'Toko (yellow card) 42'; Salgado (yellow card) 45'; Kiffe (yellow card) 55'	Stadium: Toyota Field

February 23, 2019	San Antonio FC	0 – 0	El Paso Locomotive FC	San Antonio, Texas
8:30 PM CDT		Report	Diaz (yellow card) 15'; Rezende (yellow card) 23'; Gebhard (yellow card) 45'	Stadium: Toyota Field

March 1, 2019	San Antonio FC	4 – 3	Rio Grande Valley FC Toros	San Antonio, Texas
1:00 PM CDT	Guzmán 4', 54'; Forbes 31'; 60' (o.g.)	Report	Small 21'; Foster 24'; W. Cabrera 53'	Stadium: Toyota Field; Attendance: Closed-door

March 2, 2019	San Antonio FC	3 – 2	Trinity University	San Antonio, Texas
11:00 AM CDT	Bruce 30', 60'; Trialist 46'	Report	61' (pen.); 65'	Stadium: Toyota Field; Attendance: Closed-door

== Competitions ==
=== Overall ===
Position in the Western Conference

Competition	Started round	Final position / round	First match	Last match
USL Championship	—	11th	March 9, 2019	October 19, 2019
U.S. Open Cup	Second Round	Third Round	May 14, 2019	June 3, 2019

Updated to match played October 21, 2019
Source: Competitions

=== Overview ===
Competition	Record							
Competition	G	W	D	L	GF	GA	GD	Win %
USL Championship	34	12	9	13	62	57	+5	35.29
U.S. Open Cup	2	1	0	1	4	4	+0	50.00
Total	36	13	9	14	66	61	+5	36.11

Updated to match played October 21, 2019
Source: Competitions

=== USL Championship ===
==== League table ====
Pos	Team	Pld	W	D	L	GF	GA	GD	Pts	Qualification
9	LA Galaxy II	34	12	12	10	59	62	−3	48	Play-In Round
10	New Mexico United	34	11	13	10	59	57	+2	46	Play-In Round
11	San Antonio FC	34	12	9	13	62	57	+5	45	
12	Rio Grande Valley Toros	34	11	8	15	50	58	−8	41	
13	Las Vegas Lights FC	34	11	8	15	46	56	−10	41	

Source: USL Championship Standings
Rules for classification: 1) total wins; 2) total goal differential; 3) total goals scored; 4) points earned against top four Conference finishers; 5) disciplinary points; 6) coin toss or drawing of lots

==== Results summary ====
Overall								Home						Away					
Pld	W	D	L	GF	GA	GD	Pts	W	D	L	GF	GA	GD	W	D	L	GF	GA	GD
34	12	9	13	62	57	+5	45	9	6	2	37	20	+17	3	3	11	25	37	−12

Last updated: October 21, 2019.

==== Results by matchday ====
Position in the Western Conference

Round	1	2	3	4	5	6	7	8	9	10	11	12	13	14	15	16	17	18	19	20	21	22	23	24	25	26	27	28	29	30	31	32	33	34
Stadium	H	H	A	A	H	H	A	H	A	H	H	A	A	H	A	A	H	H	A	A	H	H	A	H	H	A	A	H	A	A	H	A	A	H
Result	D	L	L	L	W	W	L	W	L	D	D	L	L	W	D	L	D	W	W	D	W	L	W	D	W	L	L	W	D	L	W	L	W	D
Position	4	16	16	17	15	11	16	10	16	16	16	16	16	16	15	16	15	14	11	11	12	12	10	12	8	11	13	10	11	11	10	11	10	11

Updated to match(es) played on October 21, 2019. Source:
A = Away; H = Home; W = Win; D = Draw; L = Loss

==== Matches ====
The first matches of 2019 were announced on December 14, 2018. The remaining schedule was released on December 19, 2018. Home team is listed first, left to right.

Win Draw Loss

Kickoff times are in CDT (UTC−05) unless shown otherwise

March 9, 2019 1	San Antonio FC	3 – 3	Phoenix Rising FC	San Antonio, Texas
7:30 p.m. CDT	Guzmán 9'; Forbes 40'; Greene (yellow card) 59'; Jahn 80' (o.g.)	Report	Flemmings 22' (yellow card) 75'; Lambert (yellow card) 33'; Jahn 42', (yellow card) 61'; Mala (yellow card) 78'; Dumbuya (yellow card) 82'; Johnson 90+3'	Stadium: Toyota Field; Attendance: 8,058; Referee: Malik Badawi

March 16, 2019 2	San Antonio FC	1 – 3	Portland Timbers 2	San Antonio, Texas
7:30 p.m. CDT	Pecka (yellow card) 14'; Barmby 28' (pen.), (yellow card) 72'; Greene (yellow card) 87'	Report	Wharton 18'; Loría 32', 78'; Williamson (yellow card) 66'; Miller (yellow card) 68'; Hurtado (yellow card) 79'	Stadium: Toyota Field; Attendance: 6,112; Referee: Michael Radchuk

March 23, 2019 3	Colorado Springs Switchbacks FC	1 – 0	San Antonio FC	Colorado Springs, Colorado
7:30 p.m. CDT	Schweitzer (yellow card) 25'; Argueta (yellow card) 28'; Romero 86'; Malcolm (yellow card) 90+1'	Report	Greene (yellow card) 71'	Stadium: Weidner Field; Attendance: 2,825; Referee: Matthew Franz

March 30, 2019 4	Austin Bold FC	1 – 0	San Antonio FC	Del Valle, Texas
7:30 p.m. CDT	McFarlane (yellow card) 59'; Kléber 78'	Report	Maguraushe (yellow card) 25'; Hernandez (yellow card) 54'	Stadium: Bold Stadium; Attendance: 5,803; Referee: Yusri Rudolf
Note: 100th USL league match

April 6, 2019 5	San Antonio FC	2 – 1	Las Vegas Lights FC	San Antonio, Texas
7:30 p.m. CDT	Jamieson 16'; Barmby (yellow card) 45'; Guzmán (yellow card) 70', (goal) 83'; Cardone (yellow card) 89'	Report	Torres (yellow card) 44'; Torre (yellow card) 45+1'; Rivas (yellow card) 75'; Parra 90+7' (pen.)	Stadium: Toyota Field; Attendance: 6,067; Referee: Alan Kelly

April 13, 2019 6	San Antonio FC	2 – 0	LA Galaxy II	San Antonio, Texas
7:30 p.m. CDT	Jamieson IV 14'; Lahoud (yellow card) 22'; Guzmán 35'; Hernández (yellow card) 90+1'	Report	Traore (yellow card) 73'; Walker (yellow card) 83'	Stadium: Toyota Field; Attendance: 6,096; Referee: Mike Lavergne

April 20, 2019 7	Real Monarchs	3 – 2	San Antonio FC	Herriman, Utah
8:00 p.m. CDT	Chang 48' (pen.); Blake 56' (pen.); Coffee 72'	Report	Gómez 6', 17'; Hernandez (yellow card) 47'; Lahoud (yellow card) 57'; Restrepo (yellow card) 58'	Stadium: Zions Bank Stadium; Attendance: 1,711; Referee: Malik Badawi

April 26, 2019 8	San Antonio FC	3 – 0	Tacoma Defiance	San Antonio, Texas
7:30 p.m. CDT	Jamieson 9'; Barmby 19', 24'; Eboussi (red card) 60'; Restrepo (yellow card) 69'	Report	Kingston (yellow card) 42'	Stadium: Toyota Field; Attendance: 6,357; Referee: Luis Guardia

May 5, 2019 9	New Mexico United	3 – 0	San Antonio FC	Albuquerque, New Mexico
6:00 p.m. CDT	Sandoval 9'; Wehan 59', 63'; Guzman (yellow card) 90+4'	Report	Hernández (yellow card) 45+2'; Ackon (yellow card) 86'	Stadium: Isotopes Park; Attendance: 15,023; Referee: Thomas Snyder

May 11, 2019 10	San Antonio FC	0 – 0	Orange County SC	San Antonio, Texas
7:30 p.m. CDT	Lahoud (yellow card) 17'; Hernández (yellow card) 59'; Guzmán (yellow card) 68'	Report	Seaton (yellow card) 70'; Quinn (yellow card) 72'; Forrester (yellow card) 85'	Stadium: Toyota Field; Attendance: 6,073; Referee: Kevin Broadley

May 18, 2019 11	San Antonio FC	1 – 1	Tulsa Roughnecks FC	San Antonio, Texas
7:30 p.m. CDT	Gómez 5'; Barmby (yellow card) 23'	Report	Cardone 12' (o.g.); Addai (yellow card) 45'; Roberts (yellow card) 50'; Hedrick (yellow card) 71' da Costa (yellow card) 90+3'	Stadium: Toyota Field; Attendance: 5,704; Referee: Matthew Franz

May 25, 2019 12	Rio Grande Valley FC Toros	3 – 1	San Antonio FC	Edinburg, Texas
7:30 p.m. CDT	Enríquez 30'; Salazar 36', 58'; Dunwell (yellow card) 74'; Lemoine (yellow card) 90+3'	Report	Guzmán 70'; Yaro (yellow card) 86'	Stadium: H-E-B Park; Attendance: 4,377; Referee: Michael Radchuk

June 1, 2019 13	Sacramento Republic FC	2 – 1	San Antonio FC	Sacramento, California
10:00 p.m. CDT	Keinan (yellow card) 11'; Yaro 78' (o.g.); Werner 83'; McCrary 90+5'	Report	Eboussi (yellow card) 39'; Lahoud (yellow card) 69', (goal) 90+1'; Ackon (yellow card) 79'; Restrepo (yellow card) 90+5'	Stadium: Papa Murphy's Park; Attendance: 10,020; Referee: Lukasz Szpala

June 8, 2019 14	San Antonio FC	3 – 2	Reno 1868 FC	San Antonio, Texas
7:30 p.m. CDT	Ackon (yellow card) 12'; Guzmán 44'; Bryant 61'; Gallegos 62'	Report	Hertzog 9'; Cowell 17'; Seymore (yellow card) 90+1'	Stadium: Toyota Field; Attendance: 7,467; Referee: Sergii Demianchuk

June 15, 2019 15	OKC Energy FC	1 – 1	San Antonio FC	Oklahoma City, Oklahoma
8:00 p.m. CDT	R.Garcia 55' (pen.) da Fonte (yellow card) 85'	Report	Barmby 90+1'	Stadium: Taft Stadium; Attendance: 3,415; Referee: Lorant Varga

June 21, 2019 16	Fresno FC	3 – 2	San Antonio FC	Fresno, California
9:30 p.m. CDT	Strong (yellow card) 12'; Johnson (yellow card) 20', (goal) 56', 64' (pen.); Chavez 70'	Report	Jamieson 58', (yellow card) 67'; Parano 78'; Barmby (yellow card) 90'	Stadium: Chukchansi Park; Attendance: 3,674; Referee: Brad Jensen

June 26, 2019 17	San Antonio FC	0 – 0	El Paso Locomotive FC	San Antonio, Texas
7:30 p.m. CDT	Ackon (yellow card) 45'; Barmby (yellow card) 58' (yellow-red card) 63'	Report	Beckie (yellow card) 16'; Ketterer (yellow card) 44'; Gebhard (yellow card) 87'; Gómez (yellow card) 90+3'	Stadium: Toyota Field; Attendance: 6,081; Referee: Rosendo Mendoza

July 3, 2019 18	San Antonio FC	3 – 0	Austin Bold FC	San Antonio, Texas
7:30 p.m. CDT	Okugo 8' (o.g.); Bryant (yellow card) 41'; Forbes 50'; Gallegos (yellow card) 64'; Ackon (yellow card) 67'; Parano 70'; Greene (yellow card) 90+2'	Report	Báez (yellow card) 45'; Guadarrama (yellow card) 76'	Stadium: Toyota Field; Attendance: 7,514; Referee: Daniel Gutierrez

July 17, 2019 19	El Paso Locomotive FC	1 – 3	San Antonio FC	El Paso, Texas
8:00 p.m. CDT	Fox (yellow card) 13', (goal) 28'; Salgado (yellow card) 90+2'	Report	López 8', 45+3'; Eboussi (yellow card) 34'; Jamieson 52'	Stadium: Southwest University Park; Attendance: 6,128; Referee: Mark Allatin

July 20, 2019 20	Orange County SC	0 – 0	San Antonio FC	Irvine, California
9:00 p.m. CDT	Forrester (yellow card) 29'; Alston (yellow card) 67'; Leonardo (red card) 90+2'	Report	Parano (yellow card) 57'; Barmby (yellow card) 90'; Pecka (yellow card) 90+4'	Stadium: Championship Soccer Stadium; Attendance: 1,723; Referee: Lorant Varga

July 27, 2019 21	San Antonio FC	3 – 1	Real Monarchs	San Antonio, Texas
7:30 p.m. CDT	Gómez 15'; López 31'; Forbes 83'	Report	Powder (yellow card) 28'; Etoundi (red card) 41'; Palma 45+6'; Portillo (yellow card) 51'; Blake (yellow card) 62'; Plewa (yellow card) 82'; Ryden (yellow card) 90'	Stadium: Toyota Field; Attendance: 6,550; Referee: Guido Gonzales Jr.

August 3, 2019 22	San Antonio FC	2 – 3	Sacramento Republic FC	San Antonio, Texas
7:30 p.m. CDT	López (yellow card) 14'; Barmby 51'; Pecka (yellow card) 87', (goal) 90+5'	Report	Bonomo 21', 45'; Iwasa 33'; Alemán (yellow card) 45+3'; McCrary (yellow card) 75'; Werner (yellow card) 86'; Díaz (yellow card) 87'	Stadium: Toyota Field; Attendance: 6,243; Referee: Daniel Gutierrez

August 10, 2019 23	Reno 1868 FC	1 – 4	San Antonio FC	Reno, Nevada
9:30 PM CDT	Calvillo (yellow card) 14' (yellow-red card) 50'; Fuentes (yellow card) 45+5'; Partida (yellow card) 59'; Gleadle 71'	Report	Parano 12', 44'; Jamieson (yellow card) 23'; López 56'; Barmby 57'; Hernández (yellow card) 82'	Stadium: Greater Nevada Field; Attendance: 4,670; Referee: Farhad Dadkho

August 17, 2019 24	San Antonio FC	2 – 2	Rio Grande Valley FC Toros	San Antonio, Texas
7:30 p.m. CDT	Barmby 14'; Parano 44'; Greene (yellow card) 68'; López (yellow card) 88'	Report	Fuenmayor (red card) 31'; Martinez (yellow card) 38'; Samuels (yellow card) 45+4'; Castellanos (yellow card) 51'; Small 75'; Ackon 80' (o.g.); Rodriguez (yellow card) 87'; Jackson (yellow card) 90'	Stadium: Toyota Field; Attendance: 7,533; Referee: Sergii Demianchuk

August 24, 2019 25	San Antonio FC	5 – 0	New Mexico United	San Antonio, Texas
7:30 p.m. CDT	Parano 28', 90'; Yaro (yellow card) 36'; Gómez 39'; Greene (yellow card) 42'; López 56'; Restrepo 66'	Report	Muhammad (red card) 21'; Guzmán (yellow card) 67'	Stadium: Toyota Field; Attendance: 6,057; Referee: Jon Freemon
Note: 50th all-time win in USL Championship play

August 30, 2019 26	Tacoma Defiance	5 – 1	San Antonio FC	Tacoma, Washington
9:00 p.m. CDT	Dhillon (yellow card) 9', (goal) 17', 90'; Robles 29'; Ocampo-Chavez 75' (pen.); Dobbelaere 80'; Daley (yellow card) 86'	Report	Barmby (yellow card) 31'; Hernández (yellow card) 74'; Restrepo (yellow card) 86'; Yaro 88'	Stadium: Cheney Stadium; Attendance: 2,880; Referee: Elijio Arreguin

September 7, 2019 27	Phoenix Rising FC	1 – 0	San Antonio FC	Tempe, Arizona
9:30 p.m. CDT	Aguinaga (yellow card) 64'; Musa (yellow card) 74'; Asante 87'; Dia (yellow card) 90+3'	Report	Pecka (yellow card) 80'; Hernández (yellow card) 83'; Barmby (yellow card) 89'	Stadium: Casino Arizona Field; Attendance: 6,466; Referee: Rosendo Mendoza

September 14, 2019 28	San Antonio FC	3 – 1	OKC Energy FC	San Antonio, Texas
7:30 p.m. CDT	Castillo 12'; López 26'; Harris 48' (o.g.); Pecka (yellow card) 81'	Report	Watson (yellow card) 35'; Ibeagha (yellow card) 44'; Brown 77' (pen.); Gordon (yellow card) 78'; Harris (yellow card) 90'	Stadium: Toyota Field; Attendance: 6,759; Referee: Ismir Pekmic

September 20, 2019 29	LA Galaxy II	1 – 1	San Antonio FC	Carson, California
9:30 p.m. CDT	Jorge Hernandez 8'; Hilliard-Arce (yellow card) 24'; Harvey (yellow card) 61'; Acheampong (yellow card) 82'	Report	López 10'; Pecka (yellow card) 49' (yellow-red card) 52'; Restrepo (yellow card) 84'	Stadium: Dignity Health Sports Park; Attendance: 1,504; Referee: Thomas Snyder
Note: 125th USL league match

September 25, 2019 30	Tulsa Roughnecks FC	4 – 3	San Antonio FC	Tulsa, Oklahoma
7:00 p.m. CDT	Uzo 2'; Marlon 6'; Lobo (yellow card) 24'; Altamirano 45' (pen.); Mompremier 87'; Addai (yellow card) 90'; Hedrick (yellow card) 90+5'	Report	Castillo 12', 25', (yellow card) 53'; Restrepo 30'; Taylor (yellow card) 50'; Lahoud (yellow card) 73'; Greene (yellow card) 90+2'	Stadium: Oneok Field; Attendance: 1,215; Referee: Victor Rivas

September 28, 2019 31	San Antonio FC	2 – 1	Fresno FC	San Antonio, Texas
7:30 p.m. CDT	Restrepo 17', (yellow card) 71'; Yaro (yellow card) 53'; Hernández 67'; Parano (yellow card) 71'; Castillo (yellow card) 78'	Report	del Campo (yellow card) 8'; Geffrard (yellow card) 49'; Cooper 55'; Jackson (yellow card) 62'; Samura (yellow card) 78'	Stadium: Toyota Field; Attendance: 7,932; Referee: Farhad Dadkho

October 5, 2019 32	Las Vegas Lights FC	4 – 2	San Antonio FC	Las Vegas, Nevada
9:30 p.m. CDT	Parra 8', (yellow card) 19', (goal) 45+5'; Etaka 22'; Fehr (yellow card) 34'; Garcia-Lopez (yellow card) 78'; Martínez 90+8'	Report	Gómez 10'; López 70' (pen.), (red card) 90+6'; Ackon (yellow card) 90'	Stadium: Cashman Field; Attendance: 7,765; Referee: Greg Dopka

October 11, 2019 33	Portland Timbers 2	3 – 4	San Antonio FC	Portland, Oregon
9:00 p.m. CDT	Williamson (yellow card) 22'; Ojeda 25'; Ornstil (yellow card) 73'; Wharton (yellow card) 77'; Calixtro 86'; Sierakowski 90+2'	Report	Guzmán 6', 12', 67'; Gómez 39'; Hernández (yellow card) 88'	Stadium: Providence Park; Attendance: 1,305; Referee: Matthew Franz
Note: Éver Guzmán records first hat-trick in San Antonio FC history

October 19, 2019 34	San Antonio FC	2 – 2	Colorado Springs Switchbacks FC	San Antonio, Texas
7:30 p.m. CDT	Hernández (yellow card) 8'; Pecka 30' (pen.), (yellow card) 72'; Restrepo (yellow card) 39', (red card) 90+6'; Gómez (yellow card) 45+4'; Barmby 48' (pen.); Ackon (yellow card) 63'	Report	Rwatubyaye (red card) 28'; Hundley (yellow card) 45+2'; Schweitzer (yellow card) 48'; Ackon 68' (o.g.); Bone 82'; Rodriguez (yellow card) 85'	Stadium: Toyota Field; Attendance: 8,406; Referee: Luis Guardia

=== Lamar Hunt U.S. Open Cup ===
May 14, 2019 Second Round	San Antonio FC (Texas)	2 – 0	(Texas) Laredo Heat	San Antonio, Texas
7:30 p.m. CDT	Eboussi 17'; Guzmán 42'	Report	Rebolledo (yellow card) 30'; Fama (yellow card) 49'; Kimishima (yellow card) 85'	Stadium: Toyota Field; Attendance: 4,702; Referee: Elton Garcia

May 29, 2019 Third Round	Austin Bold FC (Texas)	4 – 2	(Texas) San Antonio FC	Del Valle, Texas
7:30 p.m. CDT	Kléber 10', (yellow card) 84'; Guadarrama 39'; Lima 43', 62'; Taylor (yellow card) 57'; Saramutin (yellow card) 72'	Report	Castillo (yellow card) 37'; Laing (yellow card) 41'; Restrepo 44'; Gallegos (yellow card) 60'; Barmby (yellow card) 90+3', (goal) 90+4'	Stadium: Bold Stadium; Attendance: 2,555; Referee: Marco Vega

=== Exhibition ===
On May 31, 2019, it was announced that San Antonio would play an exhibition match against Cardiff City F.C.

July 13, 2019 Friendly	San Antonio FC (United States)	0 – 1	(Wales) Cardiff City F.C.	San Antonio, Texas
7:30 p.m. CDT	Castillo (yellow card) 76'	Report	Murphy 57' (pen.), (yellow card) 71'	Stadium: Toyota Field; Attendance: 7,723

== Statistics ==
=== Appearances ===
Discipline includes league, playoffs, and Open Cup play.

No.	Pos.	Name	League		U.S. Open Cup		Total		Discipline	
No.	Pos.	Name	Apps	Goals	Apps	Goals	Apps	Goals	Yellow card	Red card
0	GK	(United States) Matt Cardone	33	0	0	0	33	0	1	0
1	GK	(Canada) Jonathan Viscosi	1 (1)	0	2	0	3 (1)	0	0	0
2	DF	(Guatemala) Moises Hernandez	17 (2)	1	0	0	17 (2)	1	10	0
3	DF	(Cameroon) Pascal Eboussi	3 (2)	0	2	1	5 (2)	1	2	1
4	DF	(Ghana) Joshua Yaro	32	1	1	0	33	1	3	0
6	DF	(England) Johnny Fenwick	2 (1)	0	2	0	4 (1)	0	0	0
7	MF	(Jamaica) Lance Laing	6 (1)	0	2	0	8 (1)	0	1	0
8	MF	(Brazil) Pecka	21 (1)	2	0	0	21 (1)	2	7	0
9	FW	(Cuba) Frank López	12 (2)	8	0	0	12 (2)	8	2	0
10	MF	(Colombia) Wálter Restrepo	15 (10)	3	2	1	17 (10)	4	7	0
11	MF	(England) Jack Barmby	26 (6)	8	1 (1)	1	27 (7)	9	10	0
13	MF	(Sierra Leone) Michael Lahoud	24 (3)	1	1	0	25 (3)	1	5	0
14	MF	(Zimbabwe) Leeroy Maguraushe	2 (1)	0	0	0	2 (1)	0	1	0
15	MF	(Ghana) Ebenezer Ackon	32	0	0	0	32	0	7	0
16	MF	(Colombia) Rafael Castillo	5 (5)	3	1	0	6 (5)	3	3	0
19	MF	(Argentina) Cristian Parano	24 (8)	7	1	0	25 (8)	7	2	0
20	MF	(Argentina) Brian Gómez	26 (2)	7	0	0	26 (2)	7	1	0
21	MF	(United States) Leo Torres	0	0	0 (1)	0	0 (1)	0	0	0
23	FW	(Panama) Tony Taylor	2 (2)	0	0	0	2 (2)	0	1	0
25	MF	(United States) Ryan Roushandel	0 (2)	0	0	0	0 (2)	0	0	0
27	MF	(United States) Jose Gallegos	6 (8)	1	1 (1)	0	7 (9)	1	2	0
31	DF	(United States) Kai Greene	34	0	0 (1)	0	34 (1)	0	7	0
70	FW	(United States) Bradford Jamieson IV	14 (5)	5	1	0	15 (5)	5	2	0
99	FW	(Mexico) Éver Guzmán	14 (11)	8	1 (1)	1	15 (12)	9	2	0
Players who left the club
	MF	(United States) Ethan Bryant	5 (1)	1	1	0	6 (1)	1	1	0
	DF	(Canada) Amer Didic	2	0	0	0	2	0	0	0
	MF	(Turks and Caicos Islands) Billy Forbes	15 (8)	3	2	0	17 (8)	3	0	0
	DF	(United States) Carson Price	0 (2)	0	1 (1)	0	1 (3)	0	0	0

Last updated: October 21, 2019.
Source: San Antonio FC

=== Top scorers ===
The list is sorted by shirt number when total goals are equal.

Rnk	Pos	No.	Player	League	U.S. Open Cup	Total
1	MF	11	(England) Jack Barmby	8	1	9
1	FW	99	(Mexico) Éver Guzmán	8	1	9
3	MF	9	(Cuba) Frank López	8	0	8
4	MF	19	(Argentina) Cristian Parano	7	0	7
4	MF	20	(Argentina) Brian Gómez	7	0	7
6	FW	70	(United States) Bradford Jamieson IV	5	0	5
7	MF	10	(Colombia) Wálter Restrepo	3	1	4
8	MF	16	(Colombia) Rafael Castillo	3	0	3
8	MF	77	(Turks and Caicos Islands) Billy Forbes	3	0	3
10	MF	8	(Brazil) Pecka	2	0	2
11	DF	2	(Guatemala) Moises Hernandez	1	0	1
11	DF	3	(Cameroon) Pascal Eboussi	0	1	1
11	DF	4	(Ghana) Joshua Yaro	1	0	1
11	MF	13	(Sierra Leone) Michael Lahoud	1	0	1
11	MF	18	(United States) Ethan Bryant	1	0	1
11	MF	27	(United States) Jose Gallegos	1	0	1
#	Own goals			3	0	3
TOTALS				62	4	66

Last updated: October 21, 2019.
Source: San Antonio FC

=== Clean sheets ===
The list is sorted by shirt number when total clean sheets are equal.

Rnk	No.	Player	League	U.S. Open Cup	Total
1	0	(United States) Matt Cardone	7	0	7
2	1	(United States) Jonathan Viscosi	0	1	1
TOTALS			7	1	8

Last updated: October 21, 2019.
Source: San Antonio FC

=== Summary ===
Games played	34 (34 USL Championship) (2 U.S. Open Cup)
Games won	13 (12 USL Championship) (1 U.S. Open Cup)
Games drawn	9 (9 USL Championship) (0 U.S. Open Cup)
Games lost	14 (13 USL Championship) (1 U.S. Open Cup)
Goals scored	66 (62 USL Championship) (4 U.S. Open Cup)
Goals conceded	61 (57 USL Championship) (4 U.S. Open Cup)
Goal difference	+5 (+5 USL Championship) (+0 U.S. Open Cup)
Clean sheets	8 (7 USL Championship) (1 U.S. Open Cup)
Yellow cards	77 (73 USL Championship) (4 U.S. Open Cup)
Red cards	5 (5 USL Championship) (0 U.S. Open Cup)
Most appearances	(United States) Kai Greene (35 appearances)
Top scorer	(England) Jack Barmby (Mexico) Éver Guzmán (9 goals)
Winning Percentage	Overall: 13/36 (36.11%)

Last updated: October 21, 2019.
Source: San Antonio FC

== Awards ==
=== Player ===
No.	Player	Award	Week/Month	Source
77	(Turks and Caicos Islands) Billy Forbes	Championship Team of the Week	Week 1	
4	(Ghana) Joshua Yaro	Championship Team of the Week	Week 6	
20	(Argentina) Brian Gómez	Championship Team of the Week	Week 7	
11	(England) Jack Barmby	Championship Team of the Week	Week 8	
15	(Ghana) Ebenezer Ackon	Championship Team of the Week	Week 10	
0	(United States) Matt Cardone	Championship Save of the Week	Week 10	
27	(United States) Jose Gallegos	Championship Team of the Week	Week 14	
77	(Turks and Caicos Islands) Billy Forbes	Championship Team of the Week	Week 18	
9	(Cuba) Frank López	Championship Team of the Week	Week 20	
19	(Argentina) Cristian Parano	Championship Player of the Week	Week 23	
19	(Argentina) Cristian Parano	Championship Player of the Week	Week 25	
19	(Argentina) Cristian Parano	Championship Team of the Week	Week 28	
10	(Colombia) Wálter Restrepo	Championship Team of the Week	Week 30	
10	(Colombia) Wálter Restrepo	Championship Team of the Week	Week 32	
99	(Mexico) Éver Guzmán	Championship Player of the Week	Week 32	
End of Season Awards
19	(Argentina) Cristian Parano	2019 Championship Young Player of the Year	November	
