= 2018 San Antonio FC season =

San Antonio FC
2018 season
- Owner: Spurs Sports & Entertainment
- Head coach: Darren Powell
- Stadium: Toyota Field
- USL: Conference: 9th Overall: 15th
- USL Playoffs: Did not qualify
- U.S. Open Cup: Fourth round
- Top goalscorer: League: Éver Guzmán (11 goals); All: Éver Guzmán (11 goals)
- Highest home attendance: 7,946 vs Saint Louis FC (March 24, 2018)
- Lowest home attendance: 4,853 vs Colorado Springs Switchbacks FC (May 23, 2018)
- Average home league attendance: 6,939
- Biggest win: 4–0 (May 16 at Midland-Odessa FC)
- Biggest defeat: 0–4 (August 22 at Phoenix Rising FC)

The 2018 San Antonio FC season was the club's third season of existence. Including the San Antonio Thunder of the original NASL and the former San Antonio Scorpions of the modern NASL, this was the 9th season of professional soccer in San Antonio. The club played in the United Soccer League, the second division of the United States soccer league system, and participated in the U.S. Open Cup.

== Club ==
=== Coaching staff ===
Position	Staff
Head Coach	(England) Darren Powell
Assistant Coach	(Scotland) Andy Thomson
Assistant Coach/SAFC Pro Academy Director	(Wales) Nick Evans
Assistant Coach/Goalkeeping Director	(Mexico) Juan Lamadrid
Head Athletic Trainer	(United States) Adam Quigley
Equipment Manager	(United States) Rashad Moore

Source: San Antonio FC

=== Other information ===
Owner	(United States) Spurs Sports & Entertainment
Chairman	(United States) Julianna Hawn Holt
Managing Director	(United States) Tim Holt
Ground (capacity and dimensions)	Toyota Field (8,200 / 110x70 yards)
Training Ground	S.T.A.R. Soccer Complex

Source: San Antonio FC

== Squad information ==
=== First team squad ===
As of September 6, 2018.

Squad No.	Name	Nationality	Position(s)	Date of birth (age)
Goalkeepers
0	Matt Cardone	(United States)	GK	June 18, 1993 (age 33)
19	Armando Quezada	(United States)	GK	July 6, 1994 (age 32)
24	Diego Restrepo	(United States)	GK	February 25, 1988 (age 38)
Defenders
2	Darnell King	(United States)	DF	September 23, 1990 (age 35)
3	Ryan Felix	(United States)	DF	June 21, 1993 (age 33)
4	Cyprian Hedrick	(Cameroon)	DF	October 6, 1989 (age 36)
6	Moises Hernandez	(Guatemala)	DF	March 5, 1992 (age 34)
15	Stepthen McCarthy	(United States)	DF	July 21, 1988 (age 38)
20	Greg Cochrane	(United States)	DF	November 1, 1990 (age 35)
Midfielders
5	Mikey Lopez	(United States)	MF	February 20, 1993 (age 33)
7	Lance Laing	(Jamaica)	MF	February 28, 1988 (age 38)
8	Pecka	(Brazil)	MF	May 2, 1989 (age 37)
11	Ryan Roushandel	(United States)	MF	November 11, 1985 (age 40)
14	Gianluca Cuomo	(United States)	MF	April 2, 1993 (age 33)
16	Rafael Castillo	(Colombia)	MF	June 6, 1980 (age 46)
18	Ethan Bryant	(United States)	MF	August 20, 2001 (age 25)
21	Maxi Rodriguez	(United States)	MF	August 9, 1995 (age 31)
22	Charlie Ward	(England)	MF	February 19, 1995 (age 31)
23	José Escalante	(Honduras)	MF	May 29, 1995 (age 31)
27	Connor Presley	(United States)	MF	July 4, 1998 (age 28)
33	Sonny Guadarrama	(United States)	MF	March 27, 1987 (age 39)
91	Owayne Gordon	(Jamaica)	MF	October 8, 1991 (age 34)
Forwards
10	César Elizondo	(Costa Rica)	FW	February 10, 1988 (age 38)
12	Mike Seth	(United States)	FW	September 20, 1987 (age 38)
17	Kyle Murphy	(United States)	FW	December 11, 1992 (age 33)
28	Alex Bruce	(England)	FW	October 28, 1998 (age 27)
99	Éver Guzmán	(Mexico)	FW	March 15, 1988 (age 38)

== Player movement ==
=== In ===
Pos	Player	Previous Club	Fee	Date	Source
FW	(England) Alex Bruce	(United States) Texans SC Houston U-17/18	Undisclosed	January 10, 2018	
MF	(United States) Mikey Lopez	(United States) New York City FC	Undisclosed	January 26, 2018	
DF	(United States) Darnell King	(United States) Tampa Bay Rowdies	Undisclosed	February 6, 2018	
MF	(United States) Ethan Bryant	(United States) SAFC Pro Academy	Undisclosed	February 14, 2018	
DF	(United States) Chris Christian	(United States) Sacramento Republic FC	Undisclosed	February 15, 2018	
MF	(United States) Sonny Guadarrama	(Mexico) Atlante F.C.	Undisclosed	February 23, 2018	
DF	(United States) Ryan Felix	(United States) Rochester Rhinos	Undisclosed	March 2, 2018	
MF	(United States) Gianluca Cuomo	(United States) Rochester River Dogz FC	Undisclosed	March 2, 2018	
FW	(United States) Kyle Murphy	(United States) Rio Grande Valley FC Toros	Undisclosed	May 10, 2018	
MF	(England) Charlie Ward	(United States) Houston Dynamo	Undisclosed	June 8, 2018	
GK	(United States) Armando Quezada	(United States) UC Davis Aggies	Undisclosed	August 29, 2018	

=== Out ===
Pos	Player	Transferred To	Fee	Date	Source
MF	(United States) Devin Vega	(United States) Phoenix Rising FC	Undisclosed	December 13, 2017	
MF	(Turks and Caicos Islands) Billy Forbes	(United States) Phoenix Rising FC	Undisclosed	December 14, 2017	
MF	(United States) Michael Reed	(United States) Nashville SC	Undisclosed	January 10, 2018	
MF	(Cameroon) Mark O'Ojong	Unattached	Mutual Termination	February 6, 2018	
DF	(United States) Andrew Kendall-Moullin	(United States) Atlanta United 2	Undisclosed	February 18, 2018	
DF	(United States) Sebastien Ibeagha	(United States) New York City FC	Undisclosed	February 27, 2018	
MF	(United States) Kris Tyrpak	(United States) Miami FC 2	Mutual Termination	April 26, 2018	
GK	(United States) Lee Johnston	Unattached	Mutual Termination	July 26, 2018	
DF	(United States) Chris Christian	Unattached	Mutual Termination	August 7, 2018	

=== Loan in ===
Pos	Player	Loaned From	Start	End	Source
MF	(Honduras) José Escalante	(Honduras) Club Deportivo Olimpia	January 10, 2018	End of season	
MF	(Jamaica) Owayne Gordon	(Jamaica) Montego Bay United	January 16, 2018	End of season	
MF	(Jamaica) Lance Laing	(United States) FC Cincinnati	August 23, 2018	End of season	
DF	(Guatemala) Moises Hernandez	(United States) FC Dallas	September 6, 2018	End of season	

=== Loan out ===
Pos	Player	Loaned To	Start	End	Source

== Pre-season ==
The pre-season match against FC Dallas was announced by FCD on January 18, 2018. Remaining pre-season matches were announced on January 30, 2018, by SAFC.

February 3, 2018	San Antonio FC	3 – 2	University of the Incarnate Word	San Antonio, Texas
11:00 AM CDT	Bruce, Presley	Report		Stadium: Toyota Field; Attendance: Closed-door

February 11, 2018	FC Dallas	0 – 2	San Antonio FC	Frisco, Texas
1:00 PM CDT		Report	Guzmán 29'; Tyrpak	Stadium: Toyota Soccer Center

February 17, 2018	New England Revolution	3 – 3	San Antonio FC	Tucson, Arizona
6:00 PM CDT	Bunbury 22', 41'; Delamea 44'; Zahibo (yellow card) 58'; Rowe (yellow card) 63'	Report; Report	Guadarrama 12' (pen.), (yellow card) 39'; Lopez (yellow card) 49'; Guzmán 59', 61'	Stadium: Kino Veterans Memorial Stadium

February 24, 2018	San Antonio FC	3 – 1	St. Edward's University	San Antonio, Texas
11:00 AM CDT	Tyrpak 12'; Guzmán 31'; Presley 43'	Report	Goal	Stadium: Toyota Field; Attendance: Closed-door

February 24, 2018	San Antonio FC	2 – 0	UT RGV	San Antonio, Texas
1:00 PM CDT	Elizondo; Bruce 90'	Report		Stadium: Toyota Field; Attendance: Closed-door

March 2, 2018	San Antonio FC	0 – 0	Rio Grande Valley FC Toros	San Antonio, Texas
7:30 PM CDT	King (yellow card) 24'; Lopez (yellow card) 34'	Report		Stadium: Toyota Field

March 10, 2018	San Antonio FC	5 – 1	Tulsa Roughnecks FC	San Antonio, Texas
1:00 PM CDT	Tyrpak 40'; Guzmán 64'; Escalante 65', 72'; Bruce 84'	Report	Rivas 90'	Stadium: Toyota Field; Attendance: Closed-door

== Competitions ==
=== Overall ===
Position in the Western Conference

Competition	Started round	Final position / round	First match	Last match
United Soccer League	—	9th	March 17, 2018	October 13, 2018
U.S. Open Cup	Second Round	Fourth round	May 16, 2018	June 6, 2018

Updated to match played October 15, 2018
Source: Competitions

=== Overview ===
Competition	Record							
Competition	G	W	D	L	GF	GA	GD	Win %
United Soccer League	34	14	8	12	45	48	−3	41.18
U.S. Open Cup	3	1	1	1	5	2	+3	33.33
Total	37	15	9	13	50	50	+0	40.54

Updated to match played October 15, 2018
Source: Competitions

=== United Soccer League ===
==== League table ====
Pos	Team	Pld	W	D	L	GF	GA	GD	Pts	Qualification
7	Swope Park Rangers	34	15	8	11	52	53	−1	53	Conference Playoffs
8	Saint Louis FC	34	14	11	9	44	38	+6	53	Conference Playoffs
9	San Antonio FC	34	14	8	12	45	48	−3	50	
10	OKC Energy FC	34	12	7	15	43	46	−3	43	
11	Colorado Springs Switchbacks	34	11	6	17	36	39	−3	39	

Source: 2018 USL standings
Rules for classification: 1) total wins; 2) total goal differential; 3) total goals scored; 4) points earned against top four Conference finishers; 5) disciplinary points; 6) coin toss or drawing of lots

==== Results summary ====
Overall								Home						Away					
Pld	W	D	L	GF	GA	GD	Pts	W	D	L	GF	GA	GD	W	D	L	GF	GA	GD
34	14	8	12	45	48	−3	50	10	4	3	27	19	+8	4	4	9	18	29	−11

Last updated: October 15, 2018.

==== Results by matchday ====
Position in the Western Conference

Round	1	2	3	4	5	6	7	8	9	10	11	12	13	14	15	16	17	18	19	20	21	22	23	24	25	26	27	28	29	30	31	32	33	34
Stadium	A	H	A	H	H	A	A	H	A	H	A	H	H	H	A	H	A	H	H	A	H	A	A	A	H	A	A	H	A	A	A	H	H	H
Result	L	W	D	D	L	D	W	W	D	D	L	W	W	L	D	D	L	W	W	W	W	L	L	L	L	W	W	W	L	L	L	W	W	D
Position	15	7	9	11	12	12	10	8	9	8	9	9	9	10	11	10	11	10	10	8	6	7	8	8	10	9	8	7	9	9	9	9	8	9

Updated to match(es) played on October 15, 2018. Source:
A = Away; H = Home; W = Win; D = Draw; L = Loss

==== Matches ====
The first three matches of 2018 were announced on January 12, 2018. The remaining schedule was released on January 19, 2018. Home team is listed first, left to right.

Win Draw Loss

Kickoff times are in CDT (UTC−05) unless shown otherwise

March 17, 2018 1	Sacramento Republic FC	2 – 1	San Antonio FC	Sacramento, California
9:30 p.m. CDT	Alemán 45+2', (yellow card) 77'; Eissele 48'; Hall (yellow card) 76'	Report	Restrepo (yellow card) 5'; Guzmán (yellow card) 38'; Lopez 68', (yellow card) 82'; Pecka (yellow card) 72'	Stadium: Papa Murphy's Park; Attendance: 11,569; Referee: Joseph Dickerson

March 24, 2018 2	San Antonio FC	2 – 1	Saint Louis FC	San Antonio, Texas
7:30 p.m. CDT	Lopez (yellow card) 4' (goal) 21'; Pecka (yellow card) 27'; Tyrpak 60'; Restrepo (yellow card) 76'; Guadarrama (yellow card) 83'	Report	Greig 2'; Hilton (yellow card) 53'	Stadium: Toyota Field; Attendance: 7,946; Referee: Daniel Radford

March 31, 2018 3	LA Galaxy II	0 – 0	San Antonio FC	Carson, California
5:30 p.m. CDT	Requejo (yellow card) 41'; López (yellow card) 62'; Vera (yellow card) 79'; Appiah (yellow card) 90+1'	Report	Lopez (yellow card) 19' (yellow-red card) 77'; Tyrpak (yellow card) 71'; King (yellow card) 90+3'	Stadium: StubHub Center; Attendance: 1,123; Referee: Victor Rivas

April 7, 2018 4	San Antonio FC	1 – 1	Swope Park Rangers	San Antonio, Texas
7:30 p.m. CDT	King (yellow card) 32'; Pecka 34'	Report	Belmar 29'; Didic (yellow card) 32'; Barry (yellow card) 32'; Storm (yellow card) 35'; Hernandez (yellow card) 85'; Silva (yellow card) 88'	Stadium: Toyota Field; Attendance: 6,612; Referee: Ismir Pekmic

April 14, 2018 5	San Antonio FC	0 – 3	Orange County SC	San Antonio, Texas
7:30 p.m. CDT	Felix (yellow card) 55'; Elizondo (yellow card) 72'	Report	Crognale (yellow card) 6'; Sorto (yellow card) 24'; Hashimoto 48'; Enevoldsen 84'; Ramos-Godoy 86'	Stadium: Toyota Field; Attendance: 6,090; Referee: Elton Garcia

April 22, 2018 6	Fresno FC	0 – 0	San Antonio FC	Fresno, California
8:00 p.m. CDT	Johnson (yellow card) 61'; Cooper (yellow card) 78'; Caffa (yellow card) 90'	Report	King (yellow card) 76'; Tyrpak (red card) 88'	Stadium: Chukchansi Park; Attendance: 4,850; Referee: Lukasz Szpala

April 27, 2018 7	Las Vegas Lights FC	1 – 3	San Antonio FC	Las Vegas, Nevada
10:00 p.m. CDT	Adu (yellow card) 12'; Alvarez (yellow card) 69', (goal) 75'; Torres (red card) 88'; Garduño (yellow card) 90+8'	Report	Guzmán 18'; Escalante 33', (yellow card) 34'; Castillo 51' (pen.)	Stadium: Cashman Field; Attendance: 8,025; Referee: Luis Guardia

May 5, 2018 8	San Antonio FC	2 – 1	Fresno FC	San Antonio, Texas
7:30 p.m. CDT	Bruce 20'; Pecka (yellow card) 41'; Reynish 67' (o.g.); Felix (yellow card) 74'; Gordon (yellow card) 83'	Report	Ribeiro (yellow card) 39'; Johnson 63'; Cooper (yellow card) 64'	Stadium: Toyota Field; Attendance: 7,342; Referee: Michael Radchuk

May 12, 2018 9	Rio Grande Valley FC Toros	0 – 0	San Antonio FC	Edinburg, Texas
7:30 p.m. CDT	Zaldívar (yellow card) 62'; Wharton (yellow card) 78'	Report	Felix (yellow card) 37'; Castillo (yellow card) 59'; Guadarrama (yellow card) 60'; Escalante (yellow card) 82'; King (yellow card) 89'	Stadium: H-E-B Park; Attendance: 7,846; Referee: Farhad Dadkho

May 19, 2018 10	San Antonio FC	1 – 1	Tulsa Roughnecks FC	San Antonio, Texas
7:30 p.m. CDT	Gordon 7'; Felix (yellow card) 69'	Report	Jusino (yellow card) 47'; Rivas 51'	Stadium: Toyota Field; Attendance: 7,502; Referee: Ramy Touchan

May 26, 2018 11	Reno 1868 FC	2 – 1	San Antonio FC	Reno, Nevada
9:30 PM CDT	Felipe (yellow card) 5' van Ewijk 40'; Thiaw 61'; Qwiberg (yellow card) 63'; Marie (yellow card) 63'	Report	Escalante (yellow card) 41'; Gordon 47'; Pecka (yellow card) 77'; Restrepo (yellow card) 78'; Elizondo (yellow card) 83'	Stadium: Greater Nevada Field; Attendance: 4,565; Referee: Greg Dopka

June 2, 2018 12	San Antonio FC	2 – 1	Portland Timbers 2	San Antonio, Texas
7:30 p.m. CDT	King (yellow card) 50'; Elizondo (yellow card) 62'; Gordon 86'; Bruce 90+3'	Report	Williams 51' (pen.); Lewis (yellow card) 59'; Lowe (yellow card) 77'	Stadium: Toyota Field; Attendance: 7,244; Referee: Daniel Gutierrez

June 16, 2018 13	San Antonio FC	1 – 0	Sacramento Republic FC	San Antonio, Texas
7:30 p.m. CDT	Elizondo 43'	Report	Gomez (yellow card) 28'; Bijev (yellow card) 43'; Hall (yellow card) 60'	Stadium: Toyota Field; Attendance: 6,613; Referee: Rosendo Mendoza
Note: 75th USL league match

June 23, 2018 14	San Antonio FC	0 – 2	Reno 1868 FC	San Antonio, Texas
7:30 p.m. CDT	Pecka (yellow card) 85'	Report	van Ewijk 27'; Richards (yellow card) 40'; Brown 70'; Casiple (yellow card) 74'	Stadium: Toyota Field; Attendance: 6,527; Referee: Farhad Dadkho

June 30, 2018 15	Colorado Springs Switchbacks FC	1 – 1	San Antonio FC	Colorado Springs, Colorado
7:00 p.m. CDT	Eboussi (yellow card) 7'; Burt 45+1' (pen.); Schweitzer (yellow card) 56'; Hanlin (yellow card) 70'	Report	Lopez (yellow card) 26'; Restrepo (yellow card) 45+1'; Castillo 66' (pen.); Guzmán (yellow card) 90+5'	Stadium: Weidner Field; Attendance: 3,879; Referee: Joe Wykowski

July 4, 2018 16	San Antonio FC	1 – 1	OKC Energy FC	San Antonio, Texas
7:30 p.m. CDT	Cuomo (yellow card) 12'; Hedrick (yellow card) 56'; King (yellow card) 62'; Bruce 77'	Report	Rasmussen (yellow card) 35'; Barril 68'; Ross (yellow card) 80'; Ibeagha (yellow card) 90+2'	Stadium: Toyota Field; Attendance: 7,234; Referee: Malik Badawi

July 14, 2018 17	Orange County SC	3 – 0	San Antonio FC	Irvine, California
9:00 p.m. CDT	Bjurman (yellow card) 23', (goal) 63'; Enevoldsen 33'; Quinn (yellow card) 75'; Seaton (yellow card) 81', (goal) 90+3'; Pineda (yellow card) 90'	Report	Lopez (yellow card) 28'; Guzmán (yellow card) 41'; Restrepo (yellow card) 52'; Elizondo (yellow card) 73'; Hedrick (yellow card) 85'; Roushandel (yellow card) 88'	Stadium: Champions Soccer Stadium; Attendance: 2,712; Referee: Ramy Touchan

July 21, 2018 18	San Antonio FC	4 – 2	Real Monarchs	San Antonio, Texas
7:30 p.m. CDT	Gallagher 1' (o.g.); Gordon 27'; King (yellow card) 50'; Guzmán 56'; Ward 68'	Report	Velásquez 16', 61'; Blake (yellow card) 65'; Moberg (yellow card) 67'	Stadium: Toyota Field; Attendance: 6,572; Referee: Victor Rivas

July 25, 2018 19	San Antonio FC	1 – 0	Colorado Springs Switchbacks FC	San Antonio, Texas
8:00 p.m. CDT	Escalante (yellow card) 29'; Murphy 55'; King (yellow card) 85'	Report	Amoako (yellow card) 85'; Ajeakwa (red card) 90+4'	Stadium: Toyota Field; Attendance: 6,307; Referee: Matt Franz

July 28, 2018 20	OKC Energy FC	1 – 2	San Antonio FC	Oklahoma City, Oklahoma
7:30 p.m. CDT	Rasmussen 58'; Harris (yellow card) 80'	Report	Seth (yellow card) 57'; Lopez 73' (pen.); Guzmán 81'; Presley (yellow card) 88'	Stadium: Taft Stadium; Attendance: 5,168; Referee: Elton Garcia

August 4, 2018 21	San Antonio FC	2 – 1	LA Galaxy II	San Antonio, Texas
7:30 p.m. CDT	King 20'; Guzmán 50'; Lopez (yellow card) 69'; Hedrick (yellow card) 73'	Report	Büscher (yellow card) 63'; Zanga (yellow card) 76'; Hernandez (yellow card) 90+2'; López 90+4'	Stadium: Toyota Field; Attendance: 7,447; Referee: Greg Dopka

August 11, 2018 22	Seattle Sounders FC 2	3 – 2	San Antonio FC	Tacoma, Washington
9:00 p.m. CDT	Wingo 5', 45+3'; Hopeau 68'; Hinds (yellow card) 72'; Olsen (yellow card) 75' (yellow-red card) 77'	Report	Daley 13' (o.g.); Guzmán 24'; Lopez (yellow card) 31'; King (yellow card) 45+2'; Ward (yellow card) 73'; Rodriguez (yellow card) 79'; Hedrick (yellow card) 83'	Stadium: Cheney Stadium; Attendance: 4,761; Referee: Jon Freemon

August 15, 2018 23	Portland Timbers 2	2 – 1	San Antonio FC	Portland, Oregon
9:30 p.m. CDT	Diz (yellow card) 27'; Smith (yellow card) 38'; Langsdorf 42'; Zambrano (yellow card) 45+5', (goal) 54'; Anguiano (yellow card) 85'	Report	Gordon 28'; Lopez (yellow card) 42'; Cuomo (yellow card) 48'; Pecka (yellow card) 69'	Stadium: Providence Park; Attendance: 1,496; Referee: Chipalo Street

August 22, 2018 24	Phoenix Rising FC	4 – 0	San Antonio FC	Scottsdale, Arizona
9:00 p.m. CDT	Cortez 18'; Asante 27'; Mala (yellow card) 39' (red card) 59'; Vega 45'; Forbes 64'	Report	Rodriguez (yellow card) 45+4'	Stadium: Phoenix Rising FC Soccer Complex; Attendance: 5,017; Referee: Daniel Radford

August 25, 2018 25	San Antonio FC	1 – 2	Swope Park Rangers	San Antonio, Texas
7:30 p.m. CDT	King (yellow card) 24', (goal) 54'	Report	Barry 6'; Didic 25'; Storm (yellow card) 65'; Rebellón (yellow card) 79'	Stadium: Toyota Field; Attendance: 6,896; Referee: Tim Ford

August 29, 2018 26	Rio Grande Valley FC Toros	1 – 3	San Antonio FC	Edinburg, Texas
7:00 p.m. CDT	Enríquez 3'	Report	Presley 49'; Laing 62'; Guzmán 81'; Lopez (yellow card) 90'	Stadium: H-E-B Park; Attendance: 3,958; Referee: Rubiel Vazquez

September 3, 2018 27	Real Monarchs	1 – 2	San Antonio FC	Herriman, Utah
8:00 p.m. CDT	Williams (yellow card) 40'; Plewa 64'	Report	Guzmán 31'; Seth (yellow card) 63'; Laing 66'	Stadium: Zions Bank Stadium; Attendance: 1,030; Referee: Marcos de Oliveira

September 8, 2018 28	San Antonio FC	3 – 2	Phoenix Rising FC	San Antonio, Texas
7:30 p.m. CDT	Hedrick 22'; Guzmán 33'; Presley (yellow card) 45+2'; Laing 50' (pen.); Lopez (yellow card) 89'; Murphy (yellow card) 90+3'	Report	Cortez 15', 87'; Farrell (yellow card) 19'	Stadium: Toyota Field; Attendance: 6,534; Referee: Ramy Touchan

September 15, 2018 29	Tulsa Roughnecks FC	2 – 1	San Antonio FC	Tulsa, Oklahoma
7:00 p.m. CDT	Vukovic 37' (pen.); Mirković (yellow card) 45+3'; Tavares 57'; Tayou (yellow card) 90+7'	Report	Elizondo 18'; Gordon (yellow card) 90+7'	Stadium: ONEOK Field; Attendance: 2,877; Referee: Eric Tattersall

September 19, 2018 30	Swope Park Rangers	2 – 0	San Antonio FC	Kansas City, Kansas
7:30 p.m. CDT	Barry 51'; Bilyeu (yellow card) 63'; Blackwood 75'	Report	Hedrick (yellow card) 27'; Lopez (yellow card) 49'	Stadium: Children's Mercy Park; Attendance: 573; Referee: Ismir Pekmic

September 22, 2018 31	Saint Louis FC	2 – 0	San Antonio FC	Fenton, Missouri
7:30 p.m. CDT	Fink (yellow card) 64'; Hilton 79'; Dikwa (yellow card) 90', (goal) 90+3'	Report	King (yellow card) 52'; Cochrane (yellow card) 63'; Elizondo (yellow card) 67'; Hernandez (red card) 87'	Stadium: Toyota Stadium; Attendance: 4,781; Referee: Mark Allatin

September 29, 2018 32	San Antonio FC	3 – 1	Seattle Sounders FC 2	San Antonio, Texas
7:30 p.m. CDT	Laing 19'; Bryant 26', (yellow card) 62'; Castillo (yellow card) 78'; Pecka (yellow card) 85'; Lopez (yellow card) 86'; Rodriguez 90+2'	Report	Gonzalez 45'; Daley (yellow card) 43'; Ele (red card) 72'	Stadium: Toyota Field; Attendance: 7,614; Referee: Lorant Varga

October 6, 2018 33	San Antonio FC	3 – 1	Las Vegas Lights FC	San Antonio, Texas
7:30 p.m. CDT	Guzmán 34', 48'; Laing 80'	Report	Ochoa 12'; Kobayashi (yellow card) 61'; Guzman (yellow card) 88'	Stadium: Toyota Field; Attendance: 6,471; Referee: Victor Rivas

October 13, 2018 34	San Antonio FC	1 – 1	Rio Grande Valley FC Toros	San Antonio, Texas
7:30 p.m. CDT	Guzmán 24', (yellow card) 90+4'; King (yellow card) 68'	Report	Sullivan (yellow card) 12'; Aguilar (yellow card) 20'; Enríquez (yellow card) 43'; Small 51', (yellow card) 58'; Wharton (yellow card) 90+4'	Stadium: Toyota Field; Attendance: 7,018; Referee: Alejandro Mariscal

=== Lamar Hunt U.S. Open Cup ===
May 16, 2018 Second Round	Midland-Odessa FC (Texas)	0 – 4	(Texas) San Antonio FC	Midland, Texas
7:30 p.m. CDT	Dominguez (yellow card) 45'; Xavi Lao (yellow card) 82'	Report	King 33'; Christian (yellow card) 76'; Lopez 87'; Escalante (yellow card) 88'; Rodriguez 90+3'; Cochrane (yellow card) 90+4'; Gordon 90+5'	Stadium: Grande Communications Stadium; Attendance: 460; Referee: Jorge Luna Hernandez

May 23, 2018 Third Round	San Antonio FC (Texas)	1 – 1 (a.e.t.) (5 – 3 p)	Colorado Springs Switchbacks FC	San Antonio, Texas
7:30 p.m. CDT	Castillo 8' (pen.); McCarthy (yellow card) 89'	Report	Uzo 26'; Eboussi (yellow card) 58'; Robinson (yellow card) 104' (red card) 120'; Jack (yellow card) 120'	Stadium: Toyota Field; Attendance: 4,853; Referee: Elton Garcia
	Penalties
	Escalante (penalty scored); King (penalty scored); Rodriguez (penalty scored); Seth (penalty scored); Lopez (penalty scored)		(penalty scored) Vercollone; (penalty scored) Jack; (penalty scored) Suggs; (penalty missed) Macias

June 6, 2018 Fourth round	San Antonio FC (Texas)	0 – 1	(Texas) FC Dallas	San Antonio, Texas
7:30 p.m. CDT		Report	Akindele 46'; Cannon (yellow card) 52'	Stadium: Toyota Field; Attendance: 6,224; Referee: Elton Garcia

=== Exhibition ===
On June 7, 2017, it was announced that San Antonio would play an exhibition match against Santos Laguna.

July 8, 2018 Friendly	San Antonio FC (United States)	2 – 1	(Mexico) Santos Laguna	San Antonio, Texas
7:30 p.m. CDT	Seth 17'; Guzmán 80'; Ward (yellow card) 84'	Report	Djaniny 16'; Nervo (yellow card) 29'; Abella (yellow card) 60'	Stadium: Toyota Field; Attendance: 7,041; Referee: Rosendo Mendoza

== Statistics ==
=== Appearances ===
Discipline includes league, playoffs, and Open Cup play.

No.	Pos.	Name	League		U.S. Open Cup		Total		Discipline	
No.	Pos.	Name	Apps	Goals	Apps	Goals	Apps	Goals	Yellow card	Red card
0	GK	(United States) Matt Cardone	13	0	3	0	16	0	0	0
2	DF	(United States) Darnell King	32	2	2 (1)	1	34 (1)	3	12	0
3	DF	(United States) Ryan Felix	15 (1)	0	1 (1)	0	16 (2)	0	4	0
4	DF	(Cameroon) Cyprian Hedrick	22	1	2	0	24	1	5	0
5	MF	(United States) Mikey Lopez	26 (5)	3	2 (1)	1	28 (6)	4	11	1
6	DF	(Guatemala) Moises Hernandez	6	0	0	0	6	0	0	1
7	MF	(Jamaica) Lance Laing	9 (1)	5	0	0	9 (1)	5	0	0
8	MF	(Brazil) Pecka	20 (2)	1	0	0	20 (2)	1	7	0
10	FW	(Costa Rica) César Elizondo	9 (9)	2	0	0	10 (9)	2	4	0
11	MF	(United States) Ryan Roushandel	18 (1)	0	0	0	18 (1)	0	1	0
12	FW	(United States) Mike Seth	7 (6)	0	3	0	10 (6)	0	2	0
14	MF	(United States) Gianluca Cuomo	5 (1)	0	2	0	7 (1)	0	1	0
15	DF	(United States) Stephen McCarthy	6	0	2	0	8	0	2	0
16	MF	(Colombia) Rafael Castillo	5 (8)	2	1	1	6 (8)	3	2	0
17	FW	(United States) Kyle Murphy	6 (10)	1	1	0	7 (10)	1	1	0
18	MF	(United States) Ethan Bryant	10	1	1 (1)	0	11 (1)	1	1	0
20	DF	(United States) Greg Cochrane	31 (1)	0	2 (1)	0	33 (2)	0	2	0
21	MF	(United States) Maxi Rodriguez	6 (10)	1	3	1	9 (10)	2	2	0
22	MF	(England) Charlie Ward	8 (4)	1	0	0	8 (4)	1	1	0
23	MF	(Honduras) José Escalante	15 (6)	1	2 (1)	0	17 (7)	1	5	0
24	GK	(United States) Diego Restrepo	21	0	0	0	21	0	5	0
27	MF	(United States) Connor Presley	15 (8)	1	1	0	16 (8)	1	2	0
28	FW	(England) Alex Bruce	8 (5)	3	1	0	9 (5)	3	0	0
33	MF	(United States) Sonny Guadarrama	11 (6)	0	1	0	12 (6)	0	2	0
91	MF	(Jamaica) Owayne Gordon	21 (3)	5	2 (1)	1	23 (4)	6	2	0
99	FW	(Mexico) Éver Guzmán	21 (6)	11	0	0	21 (6)	11	4	0
Players who left the club
	DF	(United States) Chris Christian	4	0	2	0	6	0	1	0
	GK	(United States) Lee Johnston	0	0	0	0	0	0	0	0
	MF	(United States) Kris Tyrpak	5 (1)	1	0	0	5 (1)	1	1	1

Last updated: October 15, 2018.
Source: San Antonio FC

=== Top scorers ===
The list is sorted by shirt number when total goals are equal.

Rnk	Pos	No.	Player	League	U.S. Open Cup	Total
1	MF	99	(Mexico) Éver Guzmán	11	0	11
2	FW	91	(Jamaica) Owayne Gordon	5	1	6
3	MF	7	(Jamaica) Lance Laing	5	0	5
4	MF	5	(United States) Mikey Lopez	3	1	4
5	DF	2	(United States) Darnell King	2	1	3
5	MF	16	(Colombia) Rafael Castillo	2	1	3
5	FW	28	(United States) Alex Bruce	3	0	3
8	MF	10	(Costa Rica) César Elizondo	2	0	2
8	MF	21	(United States) Maxi Rodriguez	1	1	2
10	DF	4	(Cameroon) Cyprian Hedrick	1	0	1
10	MF	8	(Brazil) Pecka	1	0	1
10	FW	17	(United States) Kyle Murphy	1	0	1
10	FW	18	(United States) Ethan Bryant	1	0	1
10	MF	19	(United States) Kris Tyrpak	1	0	1
10	MF	22	(England) Charlie Ward	1	0	1
10	MF	23	(Honduras) José Escalante	1	0	1
10	MF	27	(United States) Connor Presley	1	0	1
#	Own goals			3	0	3
TOTALS				45	5	50

Last updated: October 15, 2018.
Source: San Antonio FC

=== Clean sheets ===
The list is sorted by shirt number when total clean sheets are equal.

Rnk	No.	Player	League	U.S. Open Cup	Total
1	24	(United States) Diego Restrepo	4	0	4
2	0	(United States) Matt Cardone	1	1	1
TOTALS			5	1	6

Last updated: October 15, 2018.
Source: San Antonio FC

=== Summary ===
Games played	37 (34 United Soccer League (3 U.S. Open Cup)
Games won	15 (14 United Soccer League) (1 U.S. Open Cup)
Games drawn	9 (8 United Soccer League) (1 U.S. Open Cup)
Games lost	13 (12 United Soccer League) (1 U.S. Open Cup)
Goals scored	50 (45 United Soccer League) (5 U.S. Open Cup)
Goals conceded	50 (48 United Soccer League) (2 U.S. Open Cup)
Goal difference	+0 (-3 United Soccer League) (+3 U.S. Open Cup)
Clean sheets	6 (5 United Soccer League) (1 U.S. Open Cup)
Yellow cards	82 (78 United Soccer League) (4 U.S. Open Cup)
Red cards	3 (3 United Soccer League) (0 U.S. Open Cup)
Most appearances	(United States) Greg Cochrane (United States) Darnell King (35 appearances)
Top scorer	(Mexico) Éver Guzmán (11 goals)
Winning Percentage	Overall: 15/37 (40.54%)

Last updated: October 15, 2018.
Source: San Antonio FC

== Awards ==
=== Player ===
No.	Player	Award	Week/Month	Source
5	(United States) Mikey Lopez	USL Team of the Week	Week 2	
24	(United States) Diego Restrepo	USL Team of the Week	Week 6	
23	(Honduras) José Escalante	USL Team of the Week	Week 7	
24	(United States) Diego Restrepo	USL Save of the Week	Week 8	
24	(United States) Diego Restrepo	USL Team of the Week	Week 9	
91	(Jamaica) Owayne Gordon	USL Team of the Week	Week 12	
28	(United States) Alex Bruce	USL Goal of the Week	Week 17	
22	(England) Charlie Ward	USL Team of the Week	Week 19	
4	(Cameroon) Cyprian Hedrick	USL Team of the Week	Week 20	
22	(England) Charlie Ward	USL Team of the Week	Week 20	
28	(United States) Alex Bruce	USL Goal of the Month	July	
2	(United States) Darnell King	USL Team of the Week	Week 21	
2	(United States) Darnell King	USL Goal of the Week	Week 21	
7	(Jamaica) Lance Laing	USL Team of the Week	Week 25	
4	(Cameroon) Cyprian Hedrick	USL Team of the Week	Week 26	
7	(Jamaica) Lance Laing	USL Team of the Week	Week 26	
0	(United States) Matt Cardone	USL Save of the Week	Week 27	
18	(United States) Ethan Bryant	USL Team of the Week	Week 29	
0	(United States) Matt Cardone	USL Save of the Month	September	
7	(Jamaica) Lance Laing	USL Team of the Week	Week 30	
End of Season Awards
2	(United States) Darnell King	2018 USL All-League Second Team	November	
