= Fatao Seidu =

Ghanaian football goalkeeper

Seidu Fatao
Personal information
- Full name: Seidu Fatao
- Date of birth: 2006 (age 19–20)
- Place of birth: Ghana
- Position: Goalkeeper

Team information
- Current team: Asante Kotoko S.C.

Senior career*
Years	Team	Apps	(Gls)
2023–	Asante Kotoko S.C.		(0)
- * Club domestic league appearances and goals

Fatao Seidu (born 2006) is a Ghanaian professional footballer who plays as a goalkeeper for Asante Kotoko S.C. in the Ghana Premier League.

== Club career ==
Fatao began his career with PAC Academy, a club newly promoted to Ghana's Division One League.

In August 2023, he signed a three-year deal with Asante Kotoko S.C., keeping him at the club until the end of the 2025–26 season. At the time of his arrival, he became the fourth goalkeeper in the squad alongside Danlad Ibrahim, Frederick Asare and Moise Pouaty.

He made his competitive debut for Kotoko in January 2025, starting in a 2–0 victory against Acceler8z FC in the MTN FA Cup round of 64. He was later named in Kotoko's 23-man squad for the 2025 MTN FA Cup final against Golden Kick.

== Career statistics ==
Club
Asante Kotoko

Season	Competition	Apps	Goals
2024–25	Ghana Premier League		0
2024–25	MTN FA Cup	1+	0

- Appearances in domestic cup include the 2025 MTN FA Cup.
