= Jonathan Viscosi =

Canadian soccer player (born 1991)

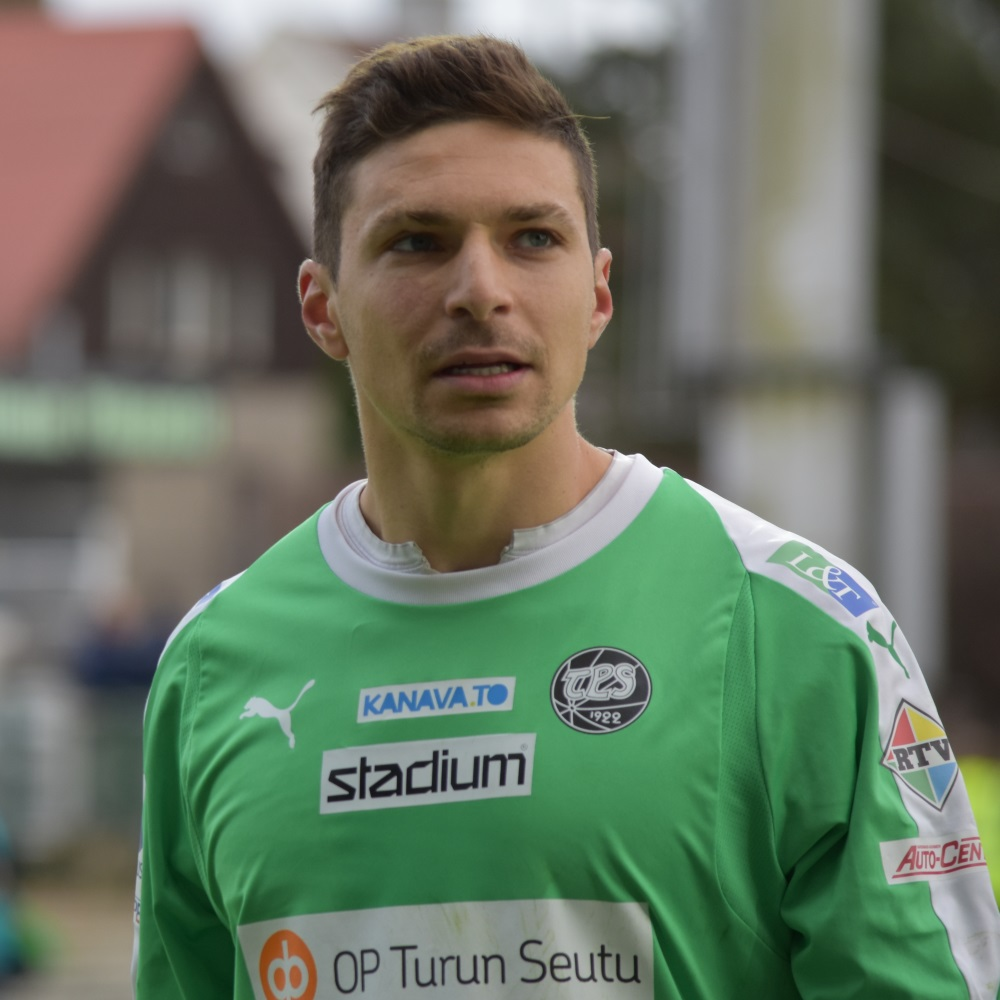
- Viscosi with TPS in 2018

Personal information
- Full name: Jonathan Joseph Viscosi
- Date of birth: March 18, 1991 (age 35)
- Place of birth: Ottawa, Ontario, Canada
- Height: 1.88 m (6 ft 2 in)
- Position: Goalkeeper

Youth career
- 2004–2009: Ottawa South United

College career
Years	Team	Apps	(Gls)
2009–2010	Rio Grande Red Storm	17	(0)
2011–2012	Buffalo Bulls	31	(0)

Senior career*
Years	Team	Apps	(Gls)
2010	Albany BWP Highlanders	7	(0)
2011	Ottawa Fury	5	(0)
2012	Des Moines Menace	7	(0)
2013–2014	Tiverton Town	13	(0)
2014	→ Carlton Town (loan)		
2014	Bishop's Stortford		
2014	Brackley Town	1	(0)
2015	Chester	1	(0)
2015–2016	Southport	6	(0)
2016	Oskarshamns AIK	8	(0)
2017–2018	TPS	59	(0)
2019	San Antonio FC	2	(0)
2020	IK Sirius	3	(0)
2021–2023	Dalkurd	45	(0)
2023	VPS	2	(0)
2024–2025	Valour FC	36	(0)

International career^{‡}
2013	Canada Universiade	2	(0)
- * Club domestic league appearances and goals as of August 10, 2025 ‡ National team caps and goals as of October 19, 2013

Jonathan Joseph Viscosi (born March 18, 1991) is a Canadian former soccer player.

== Early life ==
Viscosi played youth soccer with Ottawa South United from 2004 to 2009.

== College career ==
In 2009 and 2010, Viscosi attended the University of Rio Grande played his freshman and sophomore seasons with the Rio Grande Red Storm. He was named to the All-Mid-South Conference First Team and was a four-time Player of the Week selection.

In 2011, he transferred to the University of Buffalo. He made his debut on August 26, 2011, making eight saves in a 3-0 shutout victory over the St. Bonaventure Bonnies.

== Club career ==
During his college offseasons, he played with Albany BWP Highlanders, the Ottawa Fury and the Des Moines Menace in the Premier Development League between 2011 and 2013, respectively.

In 2013, he played for Tiverton Town in the Southern Football League during the 2013–14 season. Following his time at Tiverton, he had a proposed move to join St Mirren in the Scottish Premiership, however the deal fell through due to eligibility issues. In the summer of 2014, he had trials with Torquay United, Birmingham City, Oxford United, Mansfield Town and the Tranmere Rovers. He then had a loan spell with Carlton Town in the Northern Premier League Division One South.

During the beginning of the 2014-15 season, he played with Bishop's Stortford and Brackley Town.

In January 2015, he signed with Chester in the National League. He made his debut in a substitute appearance on 25 April 2015 against Nuneaton Town.

In July 2015, he signed with Southport in National League.

Viscosi then trialled with Finnish Ykkönen club Turun Palloseura, where he had the opportunity to join as the backup keeper, however, he instead opted to sign with Swedish club Oskarshamns AIK in search of a starting opportunity.

In January 2017, Viscosi signed with Finnish club TPS. After playing the season as the first choice goalkeeper, he indicated that he would wish to stay into the 2018 season. Upon completion of the 2017 season, Viscosi would sign a one-year extension for the 2018 season after starting every match, helping TPS earn promotion back to the Veikkausliiga in 2018, and being named the Ykkönen's best goalkeeper.

In January 2019, he signed with USL Championship club San Antonio FC. He had originally been set to play in Sweden, however, his contract fell through as the club was experiencing financial difficulties, prompting his move to San Antonio, facilitated through his relationship with Frank Barone, the club's Athletic Development Coach.

In December 2019, he signed a one-year contract with Swedish club IK Sirius for the 2020 season.

In January 2021, Viscosi would sign with Ettan club Dalkurd on a multi-year contract. In December 2022, he departed the club, despite one year remaining on his contract.

In 2023, Viscosi returned to Finland and signed a one-year deal with VPS.

In February 2024, Viscosi signed with Canadian Premier League club Valour FC. He was named the CPL Goalkeeper of the Month for September 2024. After the 2024 season, the club picked up his option for the 2025 season. He announced his retirement following the 2025 season.

== International career ==
In 2013, Viscosi was named to the Canada roster for the 2013 FISU Universiade Games.

== Personal life ==
Viscosi was born in Canada and is of Italian descent.

== Career statistics ==
As of August 10, 2025

Appearances and goals by club, season and competition
Club	Season	League			National Cup (Note: Includes appearances in the Finnish Cup, the U.S. Open Cup and the Svenska Cupen)		Other (Note: Includes appearances in the Veikkausliiga relegation playoff, the Superettan promotion playoff and the Finnish League Cup)		Total	
Club	Season	Division	Apps	Goals	Apps	Goals	Apps	Goals	Apps	Goals
Albany BWP Highlanders	2010	USL PDL	7	0	–		0	0	7	0
Ottawa Fury	2011	USL PDL	5	0	–		0	0	5	0
Des Moines Menace	2012	USL PDL	7	0	–		0	0	7	0
Tiverton Town	2013–14	Southern League Division One	13	0	0	0	0	0	13	0
Brackley Town	2014–15	Conference North	1	0	0	0	0	0	1	0
Chester	2014–15	Conference Premier	1	0	0	0	0	0	1	0
Southport	2015–16	National League	6	0	0	0	0	0	6	0
Oskarshamns AIK	2016	Swedish Division 1	8	0	0	0	0	0	8	0
TPS	2017	Ykkönen	27	0	5	0	0	0	32	0
TPS	2018	Veikkausliiga	32	0	4	0	2	0	38	0
TPS	Total		59	0	9	0	2	0	70	0
San Antonio FC	2019	USL Championship	2	0	2	0	0	0	4	0
IK Sirius	2020	Allsvenskan	3	0	2	0	0	0	5	0
Dalkurd	2021	Ettan	28	0	3	0	0	0	31	0
Dalkurd	2022	Superettan	17	0	1	0	2	0	20	0
Dalkurd	Total		45	0	4	0	2	0	51	0
VPS	2023	Veikkausliiga	2	0	3	0	2	0	7	0
Valour FC	2024	Canadian Premier League	26	0	0	0	–		26	0
Valour FC	2025	Canadian Premier League	10	0	0	0	–		10	0
Valour FC	Total		36	0	0	0	0	0	36	0
Career total			195	0	20	0	6	0	221	0
