= Jack Jones (soccer, born 1987) =

American soccer player

Personal information
- Date of birth: July 5, 1987 (age 39)
- Place of birth: Golden, Colorado, United States
- Height: 1.88 m (6 ft 2 in)
- Position: Defender

Senior career*
Years	Team	Apps	(Gls)
- FC Denver
2017	Colorado Springs Switchbacks	9	(1)
- * Club domestic league appearances and goals as of October 16, 2017

Jack Jones (born July 5, 1987) is an American soccer player.

== Career ==
Jones spent time in Colorado Amateur Soccer League with FC Denver and the Premier Arena Soccer League with Golden Strikers, before attending an open tryout for Colorado Springs Switchbacks ahead of their 2017 season. Jones signed with USL club on March 3, 2017.
