= Jun Gyeong Park =

Korean-American soccer player (born 1993)

Personal information
- Date of birth: January 22, 1993 (age 33)
- Place of birth: Jeongeup, South Korea
- Position: Forward

Youth career
- FC Seoul

Senior career*
Years	Team	Apps	(Gls)
2016	Real Monarchs	1	(0)
2016–2017	Colorado Springs Switchbacks FC	10	(0)
Korean name
Hangul	박준경
RR	Bak Jungyeong
MR	Pak Chun'gyŏng
- * Club domestic league appearances and goals as of 2 April 2017

Jun Gyeong Park (born January 22, 1993) is a South Korean-born American soccer player.

== Career ==
=== Youth and university ===
Park grew up in Jeongeup, South Korea, and attended Wonsam Middle School. Park was a member of FC Seoul's reserves and academy in the Korean K-League.

=== Professional ===
In August 2016 Park signed with the Colorado Springs Switchbacks FC after starting the 2016 season for Real Monarchs.
