= Jake Cawsey =

English footballer (born 1993)

Personal information
- Full name: Jacob Cawsey
- Date of birth: 7 May 1993 (age 33)
- Place of birth: Scunthorpe, England
- Position: Midfielder

College career
Years	Team	Apps	(Gls)
2011–2013	Bellevue Bruins	54	(4)
2013–2015	St. Louis Lions	39	(4)
2016–2017	Colorado Springs Switchbacks	15	(0)
2017–2020	St. Louis Ambush (indoor)	2	(0)

Jacob Cawsey (born 7 May 1993) is an English footballer who last played for the St. Louis Ambush of the Major Arena Soccer League.

== Career ==
Cawsey played non-league football in England with Barton Town Old Boys, Appleby Frodingham and Bottesford Town, before moving to the United States to play college soccer at Bellevue University in 2011. While at college, Cawsey played with Premier Development League side St. Louis Lions during their 2013, 2014 and 2015 seasons.

He returned to England with short spells at Winterton Rangers and Barton Town Old Boys, before signing with United Soccer League side Colorado Springs Switchbacks on 23 February 2016. He appeared in ten games in the 2016 season.

He is the son of former British Member of Parliament Ian Cawsey.
