= Ebenezer Ackon =

Ghanaian footballer

Personal information
- Date of birth: December 2, 1996 (age 29)
- Place of birth: Cape Coast, Ghana
- Height: 6 ft 0 in (1.83 m)
- Position: Defender

College career
Years	Team	Apps	(Gls)
2017–2018	Bowling Green Falcons	19	(5)

Senior career*
Years	Team	Apps	(Gls)
2016	Ebusua Dwarfs	9	(0)
2018	Lansing United	11	(0)
2019–2020	San Antonio FC	33	(0)
2021	San Diego Loyal	0	(0)
2022–2023	San Diego Loyal	6	(0)
2024	Lexington SC	2	(0)
- * Club domestic league appearances and goals as of November 21, 2024

Ebenezer "Eby" Ackon (born 2 December 1996) is a Ghanaian footballer who plays as a defender.

== Career statistics ==
=== Club ===
As of 8 February 2019

Club	Season	League			Cup		Continental		Other		Total	
Club	Season	Division	Apps	Goals	Apps	Goals	Apps	Goals	Apps	Goals	Apps	Goals
Ebusua Dwarfs	2016	Ghana Premier League	9	0	0	0	0	0	0	0	9	0
Lansing United	2018	PDL	11	0	0	0	0	0	1 (Note: Appearances in the PDL Playoffs)	0	12	0
San Antonio FC	2019	USL Championship	0	0	0	0	0	0	0	0	0	0
Career total			20	0	0	0	0	0	1	0	21	0
