= Eddy Prugh =

American soccer player

Personal information
- Full name: Edward Prugh
- Date of birth: November 3, 1989 (age 36)
- Place of birth: Bozeman, Montana, United States
- Height: 1.83 m (6 ft 0 in)
- Position: Midfielder

College career
| Years | Team | Apps | (Gls) |
| 2008 | Whitworth Pirates | 20 | (7) |
| 2009–2010 | Oregon State Beavers | | |
| 2011 | Marshall Thundering Herd | 17 | (1) |

Senior career*
| Years | Team | Apps | (Gls) |
| 2008 | Spokane Spiders | 3 | (2) |
| 2010 | Spokane Spiders | 3 | (0) |
| 2010 | Portland Timbers U23s | | |
| 2012 | West Virginia Chaos | 8 | (1) |
| 2014–2016 | Bodens BK | 70 | (26) |
| 2017 | Colorado Springs Switchbacks | 23 | (1) |
| 2018 | Skellefteå FF | 25 | (2) |
- * Club domestic league appearances and goals as of April 21, 2018

Edward Prugh (born November 3, 1989) is an American soccer player.

== Career ==
Prugh began playing college soccer at Whitworth University, before transferring to the Oregon State University and then again to Marshall University in his senior year.

Prugh represented Spokane Spiders, Portland Timbers U23s and West Virginia Chaos in the USL Premier Development League.

After a trial, Prugh was signed by Swedish club Bodens BK in January 2014, where he appeared in 70 matches for the club, during his tenure and tallied 26 goals. He became the captain of the club in his second season.

Prugh signed with USL club Colorado Springs Switchbacks on January 24, 2017.
