= Kevaughn Frater =

Jamaican footballer (born 1994)

Personal information
- Date of birth: 14 December 1994 (age 31)
- Place of birth: Saint Andrew Parish, Jamaica
- Height: 5 ft 11 in (1.80 m)
- Position: Forward

Team information
- Current team: Baltimore Blast
- Number: 31

Youth career
- 2009–2013: Harbour View

Senior career*
Years	Team	Apps	(Gls)
2013–2018	Harbour View	56	(7)
2016	→ Real Monarchs (loan)	19	(1)
2017	→ Colorado Springs Switchbacks (loan)	29	(12)
2018	→ Phoenix Rising (loan)	21	(3)
2019	New Mexico United	30	(14)
2020	Bengaluru FC	4	(1)
2020–2021	Maccabi Netanya	31	(5)
2021–2022	Hapoel Nof HaGalil	18	(3)
2022	Hapoel Ra'anana	15	(2)
2022	New Mexico United	8	(1)
2023–	Baltimore Blast (indoor)	0	(0)

International career^{‡}
2019	Jamaica	1	(0)
- * Club domestic league appearances and goals as of 16 November 2023 ‡ National team caps and goals as of 15 November 2019

Kevaughn Frater (born 14 December 1994) is a Jamaican footballer who plays as a forward for the Baltimore Blast in the Major Arena Soccer League.

== Club career ==
Frater was part of the Harbour View squad since he was sixteen years old, before signing on loan with United Soccer League side Real Monarchs SLC in January 2016.

On January 26, 2017, the Colorado Springs Switchbacks FC announced Frater would be joining the team for a season long loan. Frater won USL's Player of the Week after a 2 Goal performance against LA Galaxy II on 10 June 2017.

In December 2018, Frater signed with New Mexico United. Following a 4-goal April 2019, including a hat-trick against Portland Timbers 2, Frater was voted the USL Championship's Player of the Month.

=== Bengaluru FC ===
On February 12, 2020, Frater joined Indian Super League side Bengaluru FC, an outfit from the Garden city Bengaluru.

=== Israel ===
On July 6, 2020, he had signed for the Israeli Premier League club Maccabi Netanya.

On June 23, 2021, Frater signed for Hapoel Nof HaGalil.

=== United States ===
Frater returned to New Mexico United on August 8, 2022.

In November 2023, Frater joined the Major Arena Soccer League's Baltimore Blast.

== International career ==
In November 2019, Frater earned his second call-up to the Jamaica senior national team. He made his debut on 15 November 2019 in a CONCACAF Nations League game against Antigua & Barbuda.

== Career statistics ==
=== Club ===
As of matches played 1 July 2021.

Club	Season	League			National Cup		League Cup		Continental		Total	
Club	Season	Division	Apps	Goals	Apps	Goals	Apps	Goals	Apps	Goals	Apps	Goals
Harbour View	2013–14	National Premier League	20	0	0	0	—		0	0	20	0
Harbour View	2014–15	National Premier League	23	1	0	0	—		—		23	1
Harbour View	2015–16	National Premier League	16	7	—		—		—		16	7
Harbour View	2016–17	National Premier League	4	0	—		—		—		4	0
Harbour View	2017–18	National Premier League	2	0	—		—		—		2	0
Harbour View	Total		65	8	0	0	—		0	0	65	8
Real Monarchs (loan)	2016	USL	19	1	—		—		—		19	1
Colorado Springs Switchbacks (loan)	2017	USL	29	12	2 (Note: Appearance(s) in US Open Cup)	1	—		—		31	13
Phoenix Rising (loan)	2018	USL	20	3	1	0	1 (Note: Appearance(s) in USL playoffs)	0	—		22	3
New Mexico United	2019	USL Championship	29	14	4	3	1	0	—		34	17
Bengaluru FC	2019–20	Indian Super League	2	1	—		2 (Note: Appearance(s) in ISL Playoffs)	0	0	0	4	1
Maccabi Netanya	2020–21	Israeli Premier League	31	5	2	0	2 (Note: Appearance(s) in Toto Cup)	0	—		35	5
Hapoel Nof HaGalil	2021–22	Israeli Premier League	0	0	0	0	0	0	—		0	0
Career total			195	44	9	4	6	0	0	0	210	48

=== International ===
As of match played November 15, 2019

Year	Caps
2019	1
Total	1
