= Brian Gómez =

Argentine footballer

Personal information
- Full name: Brian Emanuel Gómez
- Date of birth: 15 February 1994 (age 32)
- Place of birth: San Justo, Argentina
- Height: 1.73 m (5 ft 8 in)
- Position: Winger

Team information
- Current team: Defensores de Belgrano

Youth career
- Argentinos Juniors

Senior career*
Years	Team	Apps	(Gls)
2012–2014	Argentinos Juniors	2	(0)
2014–2015	Estudiantes BA	46	(2)
2016–2018	Brown de Adrogué	65	(9)
2018–2019	Feirense	6	(0)
2019	San Antonio FC	28	(7)
2020	Brown de Adrogué	4	(0)
2020–2021	Droxa Dramas		
2021	Lincoln Red Imps	0	(0)
2022	Temperley	19	(0)
2023	Defensores Unidos	32	(1)
2024–	Defensores de Belgrano	69	(1)
- * Club domestic league appearances and goals as of 18:03, 25 April 2026 (UTC)

Brian Emanuel Gómez (born 15 February 1994) is an Argentine footballer who plays as a winger for Primera Nacional side Defensores de Belgrano.

== Career ==
=== Argentinos Juniors ===
He played for the "Bicho" youth team and made his debut on 20 October 2012, in a 1–0 defeat against Independiente de Avellaneda.

=== Estudiantes de Buenos Aires ===
Loaned from Asociación Atlética Argentinos Juniors, he joined Club Atlético Estudiantes in 2014, where he played a total of 44 games, scored two goals and gave 18 assists.

=== Argentina U-20 National Team ===
In 2012, Brian was called up by Marcelo Trobbiani for the U-20 8 Nations Cup that was played in South Africa. Accompanied by figures such as: Erik Lamela - Lucas Ocampos - Manuel Lanzini - Paulo Dybala - Among others.

=== Brown de Adrogué ===
After a very good time at Club Atlético Estudiantes, in 2016 Gomez arrived at his current Club (Club Atlético Brown). Where he has played 74 matches including Copa Argentina (football), and Primera B Nacional. In these matches he scored a total of 8 goals and gave 22 assists.

=== Feirense ===
On 18 August 2018, Clube Desportivo Feirense made his signing official for the next three seasons, being his first experience in European football.
