= Nicholas Amoako =

Ghanaian football player

Personal information
- Date of birth: 6 December 1997 (age 28)
- Place of birth: Mankessim, Ghana
- Height: 1.90 m (6 ft 3 in)
- Position: Forward

Team information
- Current team: Kalonji Pro-Profile
- Number: 10

Youth career
- 2014–2018: Kalonji Soccer Academy

Senior career*
Years	Team	Apps	(Gls)
2018–2019	Colorado Springs Switchbacks	6	(0)
2019–	Kalonji Pro-Profile		
- * Club domestic league appearances and goals as of 09:06, 16 October 2018 (UTC)

Nicholas Amoako (born 6 December 1997) is a Ghanaian footballer who currently plays for Kalonji Pro-Profile.

== Career ==
Amoako signed with USL club Colorado Springs Switchbacks on 11 July 2018. He made his professional debut on 14 July 2018, appearing as a 62nd-minute substitute in a 1–0 loss to Sacramento Republic.

== Personal ==
In 2011 Amoako came to the United States as a refugee from Mankessim in Ghana.
