= Uriel Macias =

American soccer player

Uriel Macias Padilla
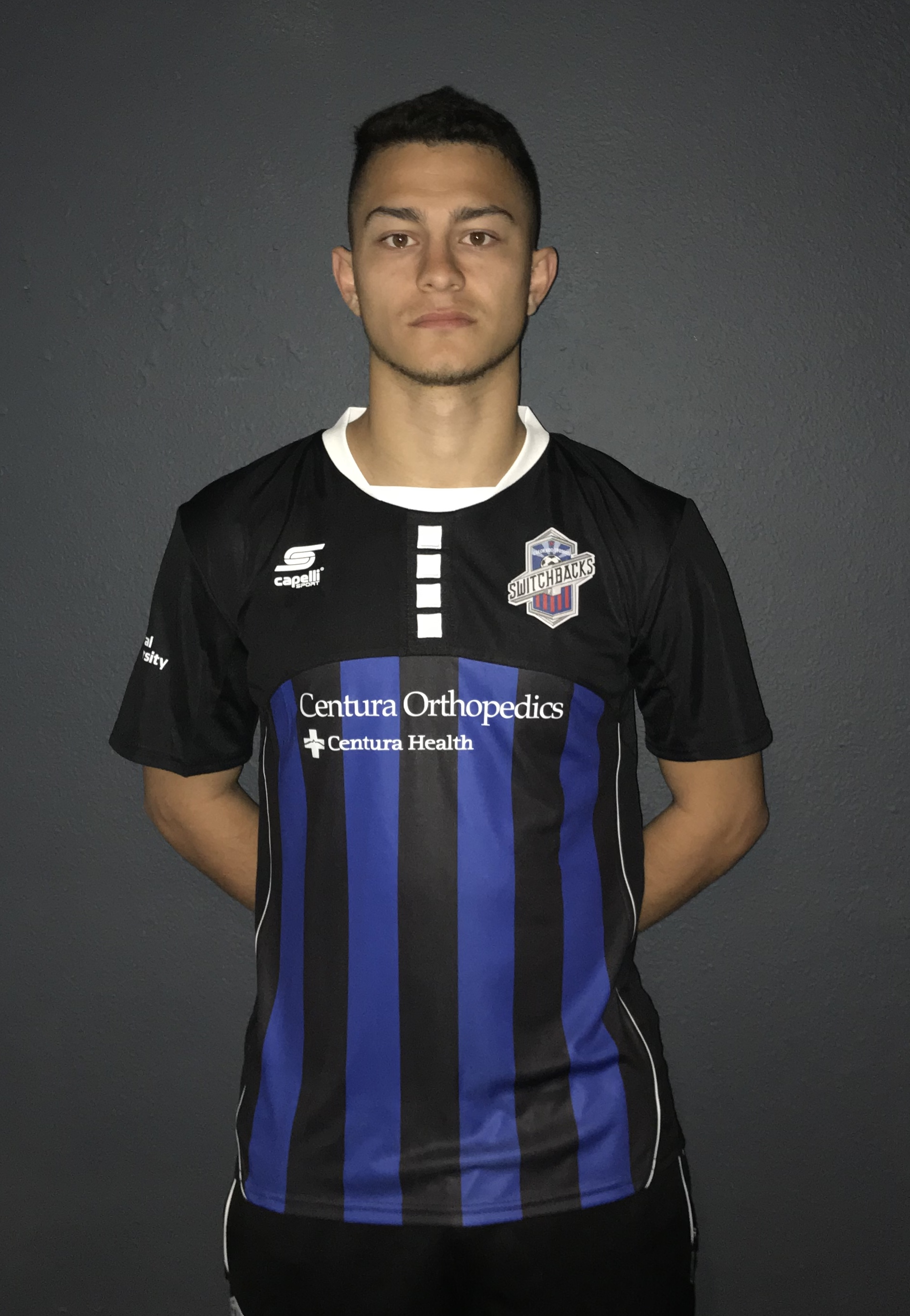

Personal information
- Date of birth: December 9, 1994 (age 31)
- Place of birth: Ligonier, Indiana, United States
- Height: 1.80 m (5 ft 11 in)
- Position: Forward

Team information
- Current team: Fort Wayne
- Number: 16

College career
Years	Team	Apps	(Gls)
2014–2017	IUPUI Jaguars	53	(15)

Senior career*
Years	Team	Apps	(Gls)
2018	Colorado Springs Switchbacks	5	(0)
2021–	Fort Wayne	0	(0)
- * Club domestic league appearances and goals as of 09:06, 16 October 2018 (UTC)

Uriel Macias (born December 9, 1994) is an American soccer player who plays for Fort Wayne.

== Career ==
=== College ===
Macias played four years of college soccer at Indiana University – Purdue University Indianapolis between 2014 and 2017. During his time with the Jaguars, he made 53 appearances, scored 15 goals and tallied four assists.

=== Professional ===
Macias signed with United Soccer League club Colorado Springs Switchbacks on February 22, 2018. In May 2021, Macias joined USL League Two side Fort Wayne.
