= Charlie Ward (footballer) =

English footballer

Personal information
- Full name: Charlie Ward
- Date of birth: 19 February 1995 (age 31)
- Place of birth: Birmingham, England
- Height: 1.76 m (5 ft 9 in)
- Position: Midfielder

Youth career
- 2007–2012: Aston Villa
- 2013–2015: Stoke City

Senior career*
Years	Team	Apps	(Gls)
2016–2017	Rio Grande Valley	43	(0)
2016	→ Houston Dynamo (loan)	0	(0)
2017–2018	Houston Dynamo	1	(0)
2018	San Antonio FC	12	(1)
2019	Ottawa Fury	33	(0)
2020–2021	Oklahoma City Energy	33	(0)
- * Club domestic league appearances and goals as of 5 November 2021

Charlie Ward (born 19 February 1995) is an English professional footballer who plays as a midfielder.

== Career ==
=== Youth ===
Ward played with the youth teams of both Aston Villa and Stoke City.

=== Professional ===
Ward signed with USL side Rio Grande Valley on 29 January 2016. On 19 July 2016, Ward signed a short-term loan deal with the Toros' MLS affiliate side Houston Dynamo, so he could compete for them in their upcoming Lamar Hunt Open Cup fixture against FC Dallas.

Ward joined Houston permanently on 1 July 2017. He was waived by Houston on 9 May 2018. He was signed by the USL's San Antonio on 8 June 2018.

Ward signed with Ottawa Fury FC on 18 January 2019.

Following Ottawa's decision to fold ahead of the 2020 season, Ward moved to fellow USL Championship side Oklahoma City Energy on 14 January 2020.

== Honours ==
Aston Villa Under-19s

- NextGen Series: 2012–13
