= Shane Malcolm =

Guamanian footballer (born 1991)

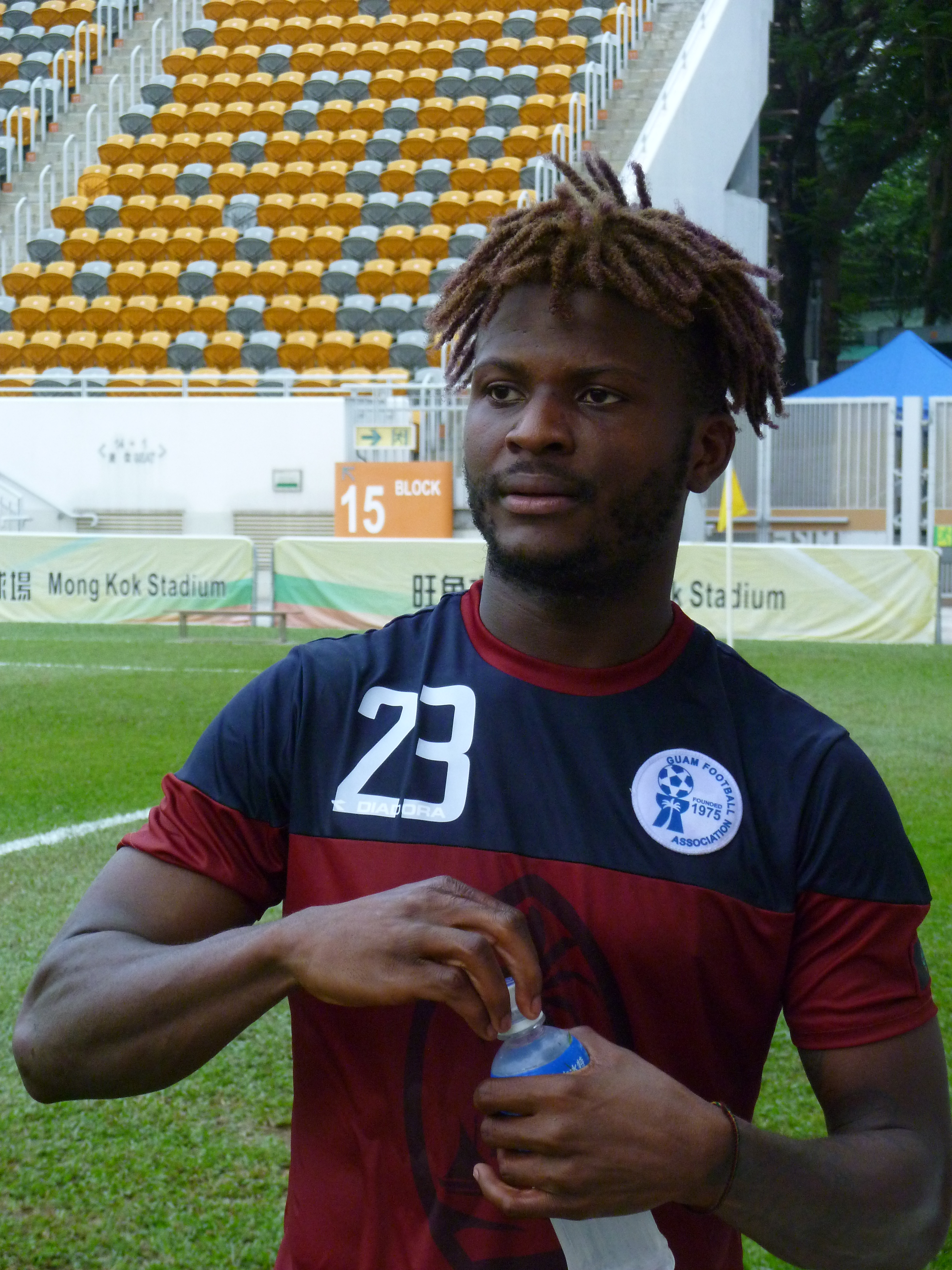

Personal information
- Full name: Shane Andre Malcolm
- Date of birth: 13 October 1991 (age 35)
- Place of birth: Montego Bay, Jamaica
- Height: 1.75 m (5 ft 9 in)
- Position: Attacking midfielder

Youth career
- Lauderhill Lions SC
- Miami FC Kendall Academy

College career
Years	Team	Apps	(Gls)
2009–2012	High Point Panthers		

Senior career*
Years	Team	Apps	(Gls)
2010	Fort Lauderdale Schulz Academy	3	(0)
2011	Reading United	14	(0)
2012	Carolina Dynamo	13	(1)
2013	Kitsap Pumas	12	(2)
2014	San Diego Flash	3	(0)
2015	Ashfield Sports Club	5	(3)
2015	Stirling Lions	6	(3)
2016	PSM Makassar		
2016	Bhayangkara Surabaya United		
2016	Persela Lamongan	8	(1)
2016	Rovers		
2017–2019	Colorado Springs Switchbacks	91	(16)

International career^{‡}
2014–2019	Guam	29	(4)
- * Club domestic league appearances and goals as of 25 October 2019 ‡ National team caps and goals as of 13 June 2021

Shane Andre Malcolm (born 13 October 1991) is a former soccer player who most recently played as an attacking midfielder for Colorado Springs Switchbacks. Born in Jamaica, he represented the Guam national team.

== Personal life ==
Malcolm was born in Jamaica, but his family moved to Sunrise, Florida, United States when he was nine years old. He qualifies to play for Guam through his paternal grandmother.

== International statistics ==
Guam
Year	Apps	Goals
2014	8	1
2015	9	0
2016	5	2
2018	3	0
2019	2	1
Total	27	4

Statistics accurate as of match played 11 June 2019

=== International goals ===
Score and Result list Guam's goal tally first

#	Date	Venue	Opponent	Score	Result	Competition
1.	13 November 2014	Taipei Municipal Stadium, Taipei, Taiwan	Chinese Taipei	2–0	2–1	2015 EAFF East Asian Cup
2.	19 March 2016	Taipei Municipal Stadium, Taipei, Taiwan	Chinese Taipei	2–1	2–3	Friendly
3.	6 November 2016	Mong Kok Stadium, Mong Kok, Hong Kong	Hong Kong	2–3	2–3	2017 EAFF East Asian Cup
4.	11 June 2019	Guam FA National Training Center, Dededo, Guam	Bhutan	3–0	5–0	2022 FIFA World Cup qualification
