= Moise Pouaty =

Cameroonian footballer

Personal information
- Full name: Pouaty Dendoum Moise D'assise
- Date of birth: January 19, 1996 (age 30)
- Place of birth: Mbanga, Cameroon
- Height: 1.91 m (6 ft 3 in)
- Position: Goalkeeper

Team information
- Current team: Asante Kotoko
- Number: 1

Youth career
- Union Douala

Senior career*
Years	Team	Apps	(Gls)
2015–2017	Union Douala		
2017–2018	Colorado Springs Switchbacks	43	(0)
2020–2022	AS Fortuna		
2022	Colombe Sport		
2022–	Asante Kotoko		
- * Club domestic league appearances and goals as of 09:01, 16 October 2018 (UTC)

Pouaty Dendoum Moise D'assise (born January 19, 1996) is a Cameroonian professional footballer who plays as a goalkeeper for Ghana Premier League club Asante Kotoko.

== Career ==
Pouaty signed with USL club Colorado Springs Switchbacks in March 2017. After signing with Colorado Springs he became an immediate impact for the team getting the Man of the Match award in his debut 2–1 win, and won his first Save of the Week award on June 8, 2017 after a clean sheet in a 1–0 win vs OKC Energy FC He kept up his dominate season, and won another save of the week in Week 20, winning over half of the vote Pouaty finished the season with 97 saves, ranking 2nd in the USL and 1st in the Western Conference.

After the season the Switchbacks decided to bring Pouaty back and announced the return of the keeper on December 18, 2017. After losing his starting spot to Steward Ceus Pouaty reclaimed his spot on April 4, 2018 in a 1-0 loss to Swope Park Rangers. In his 2nd match back as starter he earned his first win of the season against Rio Grande Valley Toros. On April 14, 2018 against Reno 1868 FC Pouaty would earn his first clean sheet of the season in a 0-4 win.
