= Pascal Eboussi =

Cameroonian football player

Personal information
- Full name: Desired Pascal Eboussi Mekongo
- Date of birth: March 14, 1998 (age 28)
- Place of birth: Ebolowa, Cameroon
- Height: 1.98 m (6 ft 6 in)
- Position: Centre-back

Team information
- Current team: AS Vita Club
- Number: 13

Youth career
- Rainbow FC

Senior career*
Years	Team	Apps	(Gls)
2017–2018	Colorado Switchbacks	31	(2)
2019–2021	MFK Vyškov	0	(0)
2019	→ San Antonio FC (loan)	5	(0)
2020	→ IFK Luleå (loan)	0	(0)
2021	Al-Merrikh		
2021–2023	Pierikos	16	(1)
2024–	AS Vita Club	0	(0)
- * Club domestic league appearances and goals as of 20:46, 6 March 2022 (UTC)

Desire Pascal Eboussi Mekongo (born 14 March 1998) is a Cameroonian professional footballer who plays as a centre-back for AS Vita Club.

== Career ==
Eboussi signed with USL club Colorado Springs Switchbacks in March 2017. Eboussi had a slow start to the season but finally broke out scoring his first goal on September 3 against Sacramento Republic FC in a 2–2 draw. This performance earned Eboussi his first spot on the USL's Team of the Week. Eboussi ended the 2017 season playing in 17 matches for the switchbacks with 11 of them being starts scoring 2 goals. On December 20, 2017, the Switchbacks announced that Eboussi would be returning for the 2018 season.

On 1 December 2018, the player signs on Czech club side MFK Vyškov. On 1 January 2019, the player signs a loan of one year on San Antonio FC in the USL Championship.

Ahead of the 2020 season, Eboussi and teammate Donovan Ewolo joined Swedish Division 1 side IFK Luleå on loan but their arrival at the club was delayed due to travel bans arising from the COVID-19 pandemic. He made the bench once for Luleå before returning to Vyškov.

At the end of January 2021, Eboussi joined Sudanese club Al-Merrikh SC. Ahead of the 2021-22 season, Eboussi joiedn Greek club Pierikos. On 2
