= 2019 Colorado Springs Switchbacks FC season =

Colorado Springs Switchbacks FC
2019 season
- President: Nick Ragain
- Head coach: Steve Trittschuh
- Stadium: Weidner Field; Colorado Springs, Colorado (Capacity: 5,000)
- USL Championship: Conference: 18th Overall: 35th
- USL Playoffs: Did not qualify
- 2019 U.S. Open Cup: Second Round
- Four Corners Cup: 4th
- Highest home attendance: League/All: 5,606 (July 4 vs. Orange County SC)
- Lowest home attendance: League: 2,702 (March 23 vs. Reno 1868 FC); All: 300 (May 15 vs. FC Denver, USOC )
- Average home league attendance: 4,005
- Biggest win: +3 goals (twice); 4–1 (March 9 vs. LA Galaxy II); 3–0 (June 8 vs. Tacoma Defiance)
- Biggest defeat: 0–5 (June 29 vs. Austin Bold FC)

The 2019 Colorado Springs Switchbacks FC season was the club's fifth year of existence, and their fifth season in the Western Conference of the United Soccer League Championship, the second tier of the United States Soccer Pyramid.

== Players ==
As of June 14, 2019

No.	Position	Nation	Player
1	GK	USA	Abraham Rodriguez
3	DF	GAM	Ismaila Jome
4	DF	GHA	Ibrahim Yaro
6	MF	USA	Rony Argueta
7	FW	MEX	Fernando González
8	DF	TTO	Jamal Jack
9	FW	HON	César Romero (on loan from Motagua)
10	FW	USA	Mike Seth
11	MF	JAM	Saeed Robinson
12	GK	HAI	Steward Ceus
13	MF	USA	Logan Hitzeman
14	DF	RWA	Abdul Rwatubyaye
16	FW	USA	Logan Dorsey
17	FW	USA	Austin Dewing
19	MF	USA	Tucker Bone
20	MF	GHA	Kwasi Donsu
21	DF	USA	Kris Reaves
22	MF	CAN	Jordan Schweitzer
23	FW	GUM	Shane Malcolm
24	MF	USA	Brandon Farmelo
33	DF	USA	Alejandro Padilla
34	DF	USA	Eben Noverr
44	DF	USA	Jordan Burt

On loan from MLS affiliate Colorado Rapids.
Colorado Rapids academy player.

== Competitions ==
=== Exhibitions ===
February 6 Preseason	Colorado Rapids U-18	—	Colorado Springs Switchbacks FC	Commerce City, Colorado
3:30 PM				Stadium: Dick's Sporting Goods Park - Turf Field
Note: Cancelled

February 9 Preseason	Colorado Pride U-19	1–5	Colorado Springs Switchbacks FC	Colorado Springs, Colorado
1:00 PM	Goal	Report	Seth, Burt; Schweitzer	Stadium: Pride Complex

February 13 Preseason	Harpo's FC	1–7	Colorado Springs Switchbacks FC	Commerce City, Colorado
5:00 PM	Goal	Report	Malcolm; Burt	Stadium: Dick's Sporting Goods Park - Turf Field

February 18 Wasatch Winter Cup	Reno 1868 FC	1–4	Colorado Springs Switchbacks FC	Herriman, Utah
10:00 AM	Richards 58'	COS Report; RNO Report	Jome 11', 61'; Seth 37'; Malcolm 77'	Stadium: Zions Bank Real Academy

February 21 Wasatch Winter Cup	Real Monarchs	2–2	Colorado Springs Switchbacks FC	Herriman, Utah
11:30 AM	Etoundi 33'; Brody 71'	Report	Argueta 17'; Seth 53'	Stadium: Zions Bank Real Academy

February 24 Preseason	Colorado Springs Switchbacks FC	—	Real Colorado	Colorado Springs, Colorado
12:00 PM		Report		Stadium: Pride Complex
Note: Cancelled

February 26 Preseason	Colorado Springs Switchbacks FC	2–0	Air Force Falcons	Colorado Springs, Colorado
2:00 PM	Reaves 44'; Bone 60'	Report		Stadium: Pride Complex Field #1

March 2 Preseason	Colorado Springs Switchbacks FC	2–2	Denver Pioneers	Colorado Springs, Colorado
1:00 PM	Burt 12' (pen.); Molano 45'	Report	Stensson 67'; Judd 81'	Stadium: Weidner Field

=== USL Championship ===
On December 19, 2018, the USL announced their 2019 season schedule.

==== Standings ====
Pos	Team	Pld	W	D	L	GF	GA	GD	Pts
14	Portland Timbers 2	34	10	8	16	65	71	−6	38
15	OKC Energy FC	34	9	11	14	45	58	−13	38
16	Tulsa Roughnecks	34	8	10	16	45	69	−24	34
17	Tacoma Defiance	34	8	7	19	42	82	−40	31
18	Colorado Springs Switchbacks	34	7	6	21	31	65	−34	27

Source: USL Championship Standings
Rules for classification: 1) total wins; 2) total goal differential; 3) total goals scored; 4) points earned against top four Conference finishers; 5) disciplinary points; 6) coin toss or drawing of lots

==== Match results ====
Kickoff times are in MDT (UTC-06) unless otherwise noted

March 9 1	LA Galaxy II	1–4	Colorado Springs Switchbacks	Carson, California
8:00 PM MST	Lopez (yellow card) 12'; Williams (yellow card) 26'; Acheampong 86'	Report	Malcolm 10', 48', 76'; Yaro (yellow card) 37'; Burt 57'	Stadium: Dignity Health Sports Park; Attendance: 689; Referee: Michael Radchuk

March 16 2	Colorado Springs Switchbacks	0–1	Sacramento Republic FC	Colorado Springs, Colorado
5:00 PM	Jack (yellow card) 56'	Report	Iwasa 57' (pen.); Skundrich (yellow card) 78'	Stadium: Weidner Field; Attendance: 2,862; Referee: Guido Gonzales, Jr.

March 23 3	Colorado Springs Switchbacks	1–0	San Antonio FC	Colorado Springs, Colorado
5:00 PM	Schweitzer (yellow card) 25'; Argueta (yellow card) 28'; Romero 86'; Malcolm (yellow card) 90+1'	Report	Greene (yellow card) 71'	Stadium: Weidner Field; Attendance: 2,825; Referee: Matthew Franz

March 30 4 Four Corners Cup	Phoenix Rising FC	2–2	Colorado Springs Switchbacks	Scottsdale, Arizona
8:30 PM	Jahn (yellow card) 41' (goal) 86'; Farrell 44'	Report	Burt 26'; Jome 90+1'	Stadium: Phoenix Rising FC Soccer Complex; Attendance: 6,446; Referee: Greg Dopka

April 6 5	Orange County SC	2–0	Colorado Springs Switchbacks	Irvine, California
8:00 PM	Jones 42', 57'; McLain (yellow card) 83'; Adams (yellow card) 87'	Report	Yaro (yellow card) 89'	Stadium: Orange County Great Park; Attendance: 1,726; Referee: Malik Badawi

April 13 6	Colorado Springs Switchbacks	0–2	Reno 1868 FC	Colorado Springs, Colorado
6:00 PM	Romero (yellow card) 68'	Report	Brown (yellow card) 60', (goal) 90+3'; Casiple 64'	Stadium: Weidner Field; Attendance: 2,702; Referee: Miguel Urbina-Barrios

April 20 7	Portland Timbers 2	2–2	Colorado Springs Switchbacks	Portland, Oregon
8:00 PM	Smith (yellow card) 46'; Jadama (yellow card) 61'; Langsdorf 63', 86'	Report	Burt 18' (pen.); Hundley (yellow card) 45'; Schweitzer 84'	Stadium: Merlo Field; Attendance: 1,822; Referee: Mark Allatin

April 24 8	Tulsa Roughnecks FC	2–0	Colorado Springs Switchbacks	Tulsa, Oklahoma
6:00 PM	da Costa 68', (yellow card) 78', (goal) 90+1'; Lobo (yellow card) 80'; Silva (yellow card) 84'	Preview	Argueta (yellow card) 70'	Stadium: ONEOK Field; Attendance: 1,948; Referee: Elton Garcia

Saturday. May 4 9	Colorado Springs Switchbacks	0–2	El Paso Locomotive FC	Colorado Springs, Colorado
6:00 PM	Schweitzer (yellow card) 65'	Report	Jérôme (yellow card) 24'; Ross (yellow card) 38'; Kiffe (yellow card) 45+3'; Kiesewetter 46', 56'; Ryan (yellow card) 59'; Rezende (yellow card) 64'	Stadium: Weidner Field; Attendance: 3,883; Referee: Lorant Varga

Saturday. May 11 10	Las Vegas Lights FC	3–0	Colorado Springs Switchbacks	Las Vegas, Nevada
8:30 PM	Parra 34', 76' (pen.); Fehr (yellow card) 41'; Ochoa 45+1'; Sandoval (yellow card) 65'; Hernandez (yellow card) 90+1'	Report	Hitzeman (yellow card) 87'	Stadium: Cashman Field; Attendance: 7,023; Referee: Alejandro Aguilera

May 18 11 Four Corners Cup	Colorado Springs Switchbacks	1–3	New Mexico United	Colorado Springs, Colorado
6:00 PM	Molano (yellow card) 24'; Reaves (yellow card) 38'; Seth 63'	Report	Frater 18', 36', 75', (yellow card) 88'; Guzman (yellow card) 90'	Stadium: Weidner Field; Attendance: 4,151; Referee: Farhad Dadkho

May 25 12	OKC Energy	1–0	Colorado Springs Switchbacks	Oklahoma City, Oklahoma
7:30 PM CDT	Gordon 15'; R.García (yellow card) 87'	Report	Jome (yellow card) 37'	Stadium: Taft Stadium; Attendance: 4,597; Referee: Matthew Corrigan

Saturday. June 1 13	Colorado Springs Switchbacks	1–0	Fresno FC	Colorado Springs, Colorado
8:30 PM	Burt 45'; Reaves (yellow card) 83'; Molano (yellow card) 89'	Report		Stadium: Weidner Field; Attendance: 3,517; Referee: Michael Radchuk

Saturday. June 8 14	Colorado Springs Switchbacks	3–0	Tacoma Defiance	Colorado Springs, Colorado
6:00 PM	Burt 23', (yellow card) 45+3'; Yaro (yellow card) 34'; Dorsey 71'; Jome 87'	Report	Gonzalez (yellow card) 51'; Berkolds (yellow card) 89'	Stadium: Weidner Field; Attendance: 3,547; Referee: Greg Dopka

June 15 15	Rio Grande Valley FC Toros	3–0	Colorado Springs Switchbacks	Edinburg, Texas
7:30 PM	Hernandez (yellow card) 32'; W. Cabrera 55'; Small 74' (pen.), 85'; Enriquez (yellow card) 84'	Report	Schweitzer (yellow card) 42'; Seth (yellow card) 50'	Stadium: H-E-B Park; Attendance: 4,004; Referee: Dejan Susak

June 22 16 Four Corners Cup	Colorado Springs Switchbacks	1–2	Real Monarchs	Colorado Springs, Colorado
7:00 PM	Argueta (yellow card) 30'; Seth 55'; Rwatubyaye (yellow card) 61'; Jome (yellow card) 64'	Report	Heard (yellow card) 36'; Ávila (yellow card) 45+3'; Coffee 81'; Portillo 86'	Stadium: Weidner Field; Attendance: 4,506; Referee: Luis Guardia

June 29 17	Austin Bold FC	5–0	Colorado Springs Switchbacks	Austin, Texas
7:30 PM	Lima 13', 20'; Kléber (yellow card) 21'; Atuahene 28'; Báez 50'; Burt 56' (o.g.)	Report	Rwatubyaye (yellow card) 54'; Robinson (yellow card) 75'	Stadium: Bold Stadium; Referee: Adam Kilpatrick

July 4 18	Colorado Springs Switchbacks	1–2	Orange County SC	Colorado Springs, Colorado
7:00 PM	Argueta 46'; Burt (yellow card) 67'	Report	Alvarado (yellow card) 44'; Seaton 49'; Ramos-Godoy 76'; Hume (red card) 86'	Stadium: Weidner Field; Attendance: 5,606; Referee: Rosendo Mendoza

July 13 19	Colorado Springs Switchbacks	1–0	Tulsa Roughnecks	Colorado Springs, Colorado
7:00 PM	Malcolm 61'	Report	Hedrick (yellow card) 60'; Roberts (yellow card) 63'	Stadium: Weidner Field; Attendance: 4,034; Referee: Ismir Pekmic

July 20 20	Colorado Springs Switchbacks	1–0	OKC Energy	Colorado Springs, Colorado
6:00 PM	Rwatubyaye (yellow card) 25' (yellow-red card) 83'; Jome 51'; Argueta (yellow card) 72'; Hundley (yellow card) 82'	Report	Ross (yellow card) 45+1'	Stadium: Weidner Field; Attendance: 3,727; Referee: Joseph Salinas

July 27 21	Reno 1868 FC	4–0	Colorado Springs Switchbacks	Reno, Nevada
7:30 PM	Hertzog 18'; Lacroix 27'; Mfeka 51', 69'; Partida (yellow card) 80'; Richards (yellow card) 90+3'	Report	Schweitzer (yellow card) 76'; Bone (yellow card) 80'; Hundley (yellow card) 90+3'	Stadium: Greater Nevada Field; Attendance: 4,209; Referee: Chris Ruska

August 2 22	Real Monarchs	1–0	Colorado Springs Switchbacks	Herriman, Utah
8:00 PM	German 86', (yellow card) 86'	Report	Rodriguez (yellow card) 83'	Stadium: Zions Bank Stadium; Attendance: 1,817; Referee: David Barrie

August 7 23	Colorado Springs Switchbacks	2–2	Portland Timbers 2	Colorado Springs, Colorado
7:00 PM	Jome 48'; Robinson 67'	Report	Ojeda 35'; Langsdorf 69'; Sierakowski (yellow card) 82'; Smith (yellow card) 90+3'	Stadium: Weidner Field; Attendance: 4,201; Referee: Brandon Stevis

August 10 24	Colorado Springs Switchbacks	3–3	Rio Grande Valley FC Toros	Colorado Springs, Colorado
7:00 PM	Malcolm 12'; Burt 20', (yellow card) 47'; Robinson (yellow card) 45+2'; Schweitzer (yellow card) 81'; Rwatubyaye 90+3'	Report	Salazar 27'; Rodriguez 42'; Arcila 58'; Coronado (yellow card) 90+6'	Stadium: Weidner Field; Attendance: 4,254; Referee: Eric Tattersall

August 17 25	Sacramento Republic FC	4–0	Colorado Springs Switchbacks	Sacramento, California
8:00 PM	Barahona (yellow card) 24'; Villareal 31'; Enevoldsen 57', 60'; Iwasa 72'; Partain (yellow card) 80'	Report	Hundley (yellow card) 43'; Burt (yellow card) 48'	Stadium: Papa Murphy's Park; Attendance: 9,350; Referee: Thomas Snyder

August 24 26	Fresno FC	2–1	Colorado Springs Switchbacks	Fresno, California
8:30 PM	del Campo (yellow card) 53', (goal) 90'; Kurimoto 67'	Report	Anderson (yellow card) 27'; Rwatubyaye (yellow card) 29'; Robinson 63'	Stadium: Chukchansi Park; Attendance: 3,396; Referee: Alejandro Aguilera

August 31 27	Colorado Springs Switchbacks	0–3	Phoenix Rising FC	Colorado Springs, Colorado
6:00pm	Reaves (yellow card) 37'; Jack (yellow card) 45+4'; Schweitzer (yellow card) 64'	Report	Aguinaga 5', (yellow card) 83'; Asante 8'; Jahn 27'; Calistri (yellow card) 82'	Stadium: Weidner Field; Attendance: 4,139; Referee: Brad Jensen

September 7 28	Colorado Springs Switchbacks	1–1	Austin Bold FC	Colorado Springs, Colorado
7:00 PM	Romero 41'	Report	Rissi (yellow card) 26', (goal) 70'; Restrepo (yellow card) 45+2'; Tyrpak (yellow card) 59'; Twumasi (yellow card) 65'; Phillips (yellow card) 90'	Stadium: Weidner Field; Attendance: 4,850; Referee: Calin Radosav

September 14 29	New Mexico United	3–1	Colorado Springs Switchbacks	Albuquerque, New Mexico
7:30 PM	Sandoval 8', (yellow card) 47', (goal) 47', 66'; Moar (yellow card) 26'; Hamilton (yellow card) 36'	Report	Romero (yellow card) 32'; Reaves (yellow card) 51'; Burt 78'; Jome (yellow card) 87'	Stadium: Isotopes Park; Attendance: 12,122; Referee: Farhad Dadkho

September 21 30	El Paso Locomotive FC	2–0	Colorado Springs Switchbacks FC	El Paso, Texas
7:30 PM	Rebellón 22'; Bosetti 90'	Report	Burt (yellow card) 51'; Malcolm (yellow card) 76'	Stadium: Southwest University Park; Attendance: 6,401; Referee: Jonathan Bilinski

September 28 31	Colorado Springs Switchbacks	1–3	Las Vegas Lights FC	Colorado Springs, Colorado
7:00 PM	Malcolm (yellow card) 25'; Rwatubyaye 90+2'	Report	de la Fuente (yellow card) 42'; Parra 55', (yellow card) 75', (goal) 84'; Tabortetaka 81'	Stadium: Weidner Field; Attendance: 4,279; Referee: Mark Allatin

October 5 32	Colorado Springs Switchbacks FC	2–0	LA Galaxy II	Colorado Springs, Colorado
16:00	Hundley 29'; Robinson 40'; Anderson (yellow card) 48'; Argueta (yellow card) 77'; Romero (yellow card) 79'	Report	Kamara (yellow card) 49'; DePuy (yellow card) 70'; Hilliard-Arce (yellow card) 84'	Stadium: Weidner Field; Attendance: 5,008; Referee: Lorant Varga

October 12 33	Tacoma Defiance	2–0	Colorado Springs Switchbacks FC	Tacoma, Washington
8:00 PM	Daley (yellow card) 55'; Burke-Gilroy (yellow card) 61'; Atencio 90+3'; Robles 90+4'	Report	Robinson (yellow card) 10'; Reaves (yellow card) 26'	Stadium: Cheney Stadium; Attendance: 3,351; Referee: Danielle Chesky

October 19 34	San Antonio FC	2–2	Colorado Springs Switchbacks FC	San Antonio, Texas
7:30 p.m. CDT	Hernández (yellow card) 8'; Pecka 30' (pen.), (yellow card) 72'; Restrepo (yellow card) 39', (red card) 90+6'; Gómez (yellow card) 45+4'; Barmby 48' (pen.); Ackon (yellow card) 63'	Report	Rwatubyaye (red card) 28'; Hundley (yellow card) 45+2'; Schweitzer (yellow card) 48'; Ackon 68' (o.g.); Bone 82'; Rodriguez (yellow card) 85'	Stadium: Toyota Field; Attendance: 8,406; Referee: Luis Guardia

=== U.S. Open Cup ===
As a member of the USL Championship, the Switchbacks will enter the tournament in the Second Round, to be played May 14–15, 2019

May 15 Second round	Colorado Springs Switchbacks	1–0	(Colorado) FC Denver	Colorado Springs, Colorado
7:00 pm MDT	Donsu 45+1'	Report		Stadium: Weidner Field; Attendance: 300; Referee: Adam Zarrin

May 29 Third round	Colorado Springs Switchbacks	1–2 (a.e.t.)	New Mexico United	Colorado Springs, Colorado
7:00 pm MDT	Burt 52'; Reaves (yellow card) 73'; Donsu (yellow card) 90+3'; Argueta (red card) 93'	Report	Frater (yellow card) 68', (goal) 95' (pen.); Wehan 87'	Stadium: Weidner Field; Attendance: 349; Referee: Karen Abt
