= 2016 Colorado Springs Switchbacks FC season =

Colorado Springs Switchbacks FC
2016 season
- President: Nick Ragain
- Head coach: Steve Trittschuh
- Stadium: Switchbacks Stadium
- USL: Conference: TBD
- USL Playoffs: TBD
Home colors	Away colors

The 2016 Colorado Springs Switchbacks FC season was the club's second year of existence, and their second season in the Western Conference of the United Soccer League, the third tier of the United States soccer pyramid.

== Roster ==
As of June 7, 2016

No.	Position	Nation	Player
1	GK	USA	Devala Gorrick
2	DF	USA	Josh Phillips
3	DF	USA	Christian Ibeagha
4	MF	USA	Luke Vercollone
5	DF	USA	Josh Suggs
6	MF	USA	Davy Armstrong
7	MF	USA	Nate Robinson
8	MF	USA	Rony Argueta
9	FW	NIR	Martin Maybin
10	FW	MEX	Miguel González
11	FW	JAM	Saeed Robinson
12	FW	USA	Mike Seth
13	MF	USA	Kevin Durr
14	MF	KOR	Kim Tae-woo
16	MF	ENG	Jake Cawsey
18	FW	USA	Aaron King
21	DF	JPN	Shintaro Harada
23	GK	USA	Billy Thompson
24	GK	CRC	Dan Jackson
34	DF	USA	J. J. Greer
35	MF	KOR	Kim Tae-seong
44	MF	USA	Jordan Burt

== Competitions ==
=== Preseason ===
February 13, 2016 1	Real Colorado Foxes	1–6	Colorado Springs Switchbacks FC	Highlands Ranch, Colorado
10:00 (MDT)		Report		Stadium: Shea Stadium

February 27, 2016 2	Air Force Falcons	1–2	Colorado Springs Switchbacks FC	Colorado Springs, Colorado
13:00 (MDT)	10'	Report	Suggs 4'; N. Robinson 53'	Stadium: Air Force Soccer Stadium

March 5, 2016 3	CSU–Pueblo ThunderWolves	1–3	Colorado Springs Switchbacks FC	Pueblo, Colorado
19:00 (MDT)	37'	Report	Vercollone 2'; Maybin 11'; King 74' (pen.)	Stadium: Rawlings Soccer Complex

March 8, 2016 4	Colorado Mines Orediggers	0–2	Colorado Springs Switchbacks FC	Golden, Colorado
16:00 (MDT)		Report	N. Robinson 82'; Maybin 85'	Stadium: CSM Soccer Stadium

March 12, 2016 5	Colorado Springs Switchbacks FC	3–2	Colorado–Colorado Springs Mountain Lions	Colorado Springs, Colorado
11:00 (MDT)	Vercollone 10'; Seth 18'; González 34'	Report	Berntsson 21'; Barnes 57' (pen.)	Stadium: Switchbacks Stadium

March 15, 2016 6	Ventura County Fusion	0–4	Colorado Springs Switchbacks FC	Ventura, California
20:00 (MDT)		Report	King 32'; S. Robinson 40'; N. Robinson 50'; Vercollone 80'	Stadium: Ventura College Sportsplex

March 18, 2016 7	Orange County Blues FC	0–0	Colorado Springs Switchbacks FC	Irvine, California
12:00 (MDT)				Stadium: Anteater Stadium

March 19, 2016 8	LA Galaxy II	4–2	Colorado Springs Switchbacks FC	Carson, California
11:00 (MDT)	Slager (1st half); Nishanian (1st half); McBean (1st half)		S. Robinson (1st half); Vercollone (2nd half)	Stadium: StubHub Center

=== USL Regular season ===
==== Standings ====
Pos	Team	Pld	W	D	L	GF	GA	GD	Pts	Qualification
1	Sacramento Republic	30	14	10	6	43	27	+16	52	Conference Playoffs
2	Rio Grande Valley Toros	30	14	9	7	47	24	+23	51	Conference Playoffs
3	Colorado Springs Switchbacks	30	14	7	9	37	27	+10	49	Conference Playoffs
4	Swope Park Rangers	30	14	6	10	45	36	+9	48	Conference Playoffs
5	LA Galaxy II	30	12	11	7	52	42	+10	47	Conference Playoffs

Source: 2016 USL Standings
Rules for classification: 1) total wins; 2) total goal differential; 3) total goals scored; 4) points earned against top four Conference finishers; 5) disciplinary points; 6) coin toss or drawing of lots

==== Matches ====
Win Draw Loss Upcoming fixture

March 26, 2016 USL 1	Oklahoma City Energy FC	1–2	Colorado Springs Switchbacks FC	Oklahoma City, Oklahoma
18:00 (MDT)	Evans (yellow card) 12'; König 63'	Report	Maybin 32'; González 53'; Gorrick (yellow card) 86'	Stadium: Taft Stadium

April 9, 2016 USL 2	Colorado Springs Switchbacks FC	2–0	Arizona United SC	Colorado Springs, Colorado
13:30 (MDT)	Maybin 21' (yellow card) 41'; Burt (yellow card) 44'; Argueta (yellow card) 49'; González (yellow card) 54'; Phillips (yellow card) 58'; Seth 61'; Greer (yellow card) 88'	Report	Poltronieri (yellow card) 39'	Stadium: Switchbacks Stadium

April 17, 2016 USL 3	Seattle Sounders FC 2	1–0	Colorado Springs Switchbacks FC	Tukwila, Washington
20:00 (MDT)	Alfaro (yellow card) 15'; Kovar 28'; Fisher (yellow card) 85'	Report	González (yellow card) 60'	Stadium: Starfire Sports Complex

April 23, 2016 USL 4	Colorado Springs Switchbacks FC	1–0	San Antonio FC	Colorado Springs, Colorado
13:30 (MDT)	Seth 59'	Report	Palacios (yellow card) 30'; Castillo (yellow card) 69'	Stadium: Switchbacks Stadium

May 4, 2016 USL 5	LA Galaxy II	3–2	Colorado Springs Switchbacks FC	Carson, California
20:30 (MDT)	McBean 32', 47', 71'; Smith (yellow card) 74'	Report	Maybin (yellow card) 30'; Gorrick (yellow card) 33'; Castillo (yellow card) 69'; Robinson 77'; González (yellow card) 81'; Seth 90+2'	Stadium: StubHub Center Track & Field Stadium; Attendance: 1,724

May 8, 2016 USL 6	Orange County Blues FC	0–3	Colorado Springs Switchbacks FC	Irvine, California
17:00 (MDT)	Mirković (yellow card) 47'; Ajeakwa (red card) 74'; Meeus (yellow card) 85'; Feeley (yellow card) 90'	Report	Robinson 10'; Tae-woo (yellow card) 32'; Vercollone 45' (yellow card) 82'; Armstrong (yellow card) 61'; Seth (yellow card) 62'; Ibeagha (yellow card) 70'; Maybin 86'	Stadium: Anteater Stadium; Attendance: 540

May 13, 2016 USL 7	Colorado Springs Switchbacks FC	1–0	Portland Timbers 2	Colorado Springs, Colorado
19:00 (MDT)	Burt (yellow card) 44'; Seth 52'	Report	Thoma (yellow card) 86'	Stadium: Switchbacks Stadium; Attendance: 4,012

May 21, 2016 USL 8	Arizona United SC	1–3	Colorado Springs Switchbacks FC	Peoria, Arizona
20:30 (MDT)	Granger (yellow card) 9'; Ringhof 16' (yellow card) 79'; Rooney (yellow card) 87'	Report	Suggs 7'; González 32'; Maybin (yellow card) 52'; Robinson 76' (red card) 86'	Stadium: Peoria Sports Complex

May 27, 2016 USL 9	Colorado Springs Switchbacks FC	1–1	Orange County Blues FC	Colorado Springs, Colorado
19:00 (MDT)	Greer (yellow card) 21'; Phillips 32'; Tae-woo (yellow card) 32'	Report	Cortes (yellow card) 20'; McCracken (yellow card) 66'; Mirković (red card) 73'; Meeus 90+8' (pen.)	Stadium: Switchbacks Stadium

June 4, 2016 USL 10	Colorado Springs Switchbacks FC	2–0	Saint Louis FC	Colorado Springs, Colorado
19:00 (MDT)	Maybin 3'; González 17'; Suggs (yellow card) 41'	Report	Bushue (yellow card) 59'	Stadium: Switchbacks Stadium; Attendance: 3,910

June 11, 2016 USL 11	LA Galaxy II	0–0	Colorado Springs Switchbacks FC	Carson, California
20:30 (MDT)	Smith (yellow card); Rebellón (yellow card)	Report	Maybin (yellow card)	Stadium: StubHub Center Track & Field Stadium; Attendance: 708

June 18, 2016 USL 12	San Antonio FC	2–1	Colorado Springs Switchbacks FC	San Antonio, Texas
18:30 (MDT)	Araujo 8'; McCarthy 35'	Report	Vercollone 45' (pen.) (yellow card) 57'	Stadium: Toyota Field; Attendance: 6,052

June 26, 2016 USL 13	Colorado Springs Switchbacks FC	0–1	Real Monarchs	Colorado Springs, Colorado
13:30 (MDT)	Argueta (yellow card) 19'; Tae-woo (yellow card) 41'; Ibeagha (red card) 70'	Report	Torres 24'; Orozco (yellow card) 26'; Arnone (yellow card) 70' (yellow-red card) 90'; Frater (yellow card) 76'	Stadium: Switchbacks Stadium; Attendance: 2,910

June 29, 2016 USL 14	Colorado Springs Switchbacks FC	1–0	Real Monarchs	Colorado Springs, Colorado
19:00 (MDT)	Burt 13' (yellow card) 67'; Armstrong (yellow card) 76'; Tae-woo (yellow card) 89'	Report	Sandoval (yellow card) 50'; Orozco (yellow card) 54'; Okwuonu (yellow card) 78'	Stadium: Switchbacks Stadium; Attendance: 2,544

July 7, 2016 USL 15	Portland Timbers 2	1–1	Colorado Springs Switchbacks FC	Portland, Oregon
20:00 (MDT)	Vercollone 16'	Report	Farfan (yellow card) 19'; Gallagher (yellow card) 81'; Belmar 87'	Stadium: Merlo Field; Attendance: 1,630; Referee: Victor Rivas

July 10, 2016 USL 16	Seattle Sounders FC 2	2–1	Colorado Springs Switchbacks FC	Tukwila, Washington
18:00 (MDT)	Jones 60'; Mansaray 86'; Samuel (yellow card) 89'	Report	Seth 27'; Greenspan (yellow card) 31' (yellow-red card) 70'	Stadium: Starfire Sports; Attendance: 1,370

July 16, 2016 USL 17	Colorado Springs Switchbacks FC	1–0	Sacramento Republic FC	Colorado Springs, Colorado
19:00 (MDT)	Argueta (yellow card) 53'; Greer (yellow card) 71' (goal) 84'	Report	Guzmán (yellow card) 86'	Stadium: Switchbacks Stadium; Attendance: 3,401

July 20, 2016 USL 18	Colorado Springs Switchbacks FC	1–1	Swope Park Rangers	Colorado Springs, Colorado
19:00 (MDT)	Suggs (yellow card) 37'; Seth 60'; González (yellow card) 70'	Report	Myers (yellow card) 34'; Alvarado (yellow card) 68'; Tyrpak (yellow card) 72'; Molano (yellow card) 84' (goal) 90+1'	Stadium: Switchbacks Stadium; Attendance: 2,212; Referee: Chipalo Street

July 23, 2016 USL 19	Saint Louis FC	2–1	Colorado Springs Switchbacks FC	Fenton, Missouri
18:30 (MDT)	Musa 35'; Herrera 45+2'	Report	Doyle (yellow card) 23'; Maybin 55'; Ibeagha (yellow card) 62'; Seth (yellow card) 86'	Stadium: World Wide Technology Soccer Park

July 29, 2016 USL 20	Colorado Springs Switchbacks FC	1–1	Whitecaps FC 2	Colorado Springs, Colorado
19:00 (MDT)	1		1	Stadium: Switchbacks Stadium

August 3, 2016 USL 21	Portland Timbers 2	1–1	Colorado Springs Switchbacks FC	Portland, Oregon
20:30 (MDT)	1		1	Stadium: Merlo Field

August 8, 2016 USL 22	Real Monarchs	0–0	Colorado Springs Switchbacks FC	Sandy, Utah
19:00 (MDT)				Stadium: Rio Tinto Stadium

August 11, 2016 USL 23	Colorado Springs Switchbacks FC	1–0	Tulsa Roughnecks FC	Colorado Springs, Colorado
19:00 (MDT)				Stadium: Switchbacks Stadium

August 21, 2016 USL 24	Colorado Springs Switchbacks FC	0–2	Rio Grande Valley FC Toros	Colorado Springs, Colorado
13:30 (MDT)				Stadium: Switchbacks Stadium

August 24, 2016 USL 25	Colorado Springs Switchbacks FC	2–0	Oklahoma City Energy FC	Colorado Springs, Colorado
19:00 (MDT)				Stadium: Switchbacks Stadium

August 27, 2016 USL 26	Rio Grande Valley FC Toros	2–1	Colorado Springs Switchbacks FC	Edinburg, Texas
18:30 (MDT)				Stadium: RGVFC Stadium

September 3, 2016 USL 27	Colorado Springs Switchbacks FC	3–0	LA Galaxy II	Colorado Springs, Colorado
19:00 (MDT)	Mike Seth 10', 45+2'; J. J. Greer (yellow card) 35'; Luke Vercollone 58'	Report		Stadium: Switchbacks Stadium

September 11, 2016 USL 28	Whitecaps FC 2	0–2	Colorado Springs Switchbacks FC	Vancouver, British Columbia
15:00 (MDT)				Stadium: Thunderbird Stadium

September 17, 2016 USL 29	Colorado Springs Switchbacks FC	2–1	Seattle Sounders FC 2	Colorado Springs, Colorado
19:00 (MDT)				Stadium: Switchbacks Stadium

September 24, 2016 USL 30	Orange County Blues FC	4–0	Colorado Springs Switchbacks FC	Irvine, California
20:00 (MDT)				Stadium: Anteater Stadium

Schedule source

=== U.S. Open Cup ===
May 18, 2016 Second round	Colorado Springs Switchbacks FC	1–0	(Colorado) Harpo's FC	Colorado Springs, Colorado
19:30 (MDT)	Maybin 13'	Report		Stadium: Switchbacks Stadium

June 1, 2016 Third round	Colorado Springs Switchbacks FC	3–0	Arizona United SC	Colorado Springs, Colorado
20:30 (MDT)	Vercollone 39', 83' (yellow card) 61'; King 59'; Ibeagha (yellow card) 64'	Report	Rooney (yellow card) 16'; Gavin (yellow card) 44'; Blackwood (yellow card) 49'	Stadium: Switchbacks Stadium

June 14, 2016 Fourth round	Colorado Rapids	1–0	Colorado Springs Switchbacks FC	Commerce City, Colorado
19:00 (MDT)	Powers (yellow card) 51'; Serna 84'	Report		Stadium: Dick's Sporting Goods Park

=== Friendlies ===
July 12, 2016 Freedom Cup	Colorado Springs Switchbacks FC (United States)	0–6	(Germany) 1. FSV Mainz 05	Colorado Springs, Colorado
19:30 (MDT)		CSS Report; USL Report	de Blasis 7'; Rodríguez (yellow card) 20'; Holtmann 40'; Clemens 45+1'; Jairo 51'; Halimi 57'; Córdoba 90'	Stadium: Switchbacks Stadium
