= 2020 Colorado Springs Switchbacks FC season =

Colorado Springs Switchbacks FC
2020 season
- President: Nick Ragain
- Head coach: Alan Koch
- Stadium: Weidner Field; Colorado Springs, Colorado (Capacity: 5,000)
- USL Championship: Group C: 3rd Conference: 13th Overall: 27th
- USL Playoffs: Did not qualify
- 2020 U.S. Open Cup: Cancelled
- Four Corners Cup: Cancelled
- Average home league attendance: 1,000
- Biggest win: OKC 1–2 COS (March 7); NM 1–2 COS (Sept. 19)
- Biggest defeat: SLC 4–1 COS (Sept. 9)

The 2020 Colorado Springs Switchbacks FC season was the club's sixth year of existence, and their sixth season in the Western Conference of the USL Championship, the second tier of the United States soccer league system.

This was planned to be the team's final season at Weidner Field, the club's home since it started play in 2015. A new downtown stadium, also known as Weidner Field, is set to open for the 2021 season.

== Players ==
As of March 6, 2020

No.	Position	Nation	Player
1	GK	CAN	Sean Melvin
2	DF	AND	Joan Cervós
5	DF	MEX	Ever Rubio
6	MF	USA	Rony Argueta
7	FW	USA	Austin Dewing
8	MF	JPN	Hiroki Kurimoto
9	FW	USA	Christian Volesky
10	FW	USA	Luke Ferreira
11	MF	GUI	Mamadi Camara
12	FW	USA	Niki Jackson
13	MF	CAN	Aidan Daniels
14	DF	RWA	Abdul Rwatubyaye
16	DF	CUB	Adrián Diz Pe
17	FW	RSA	George Lebese
21	DF	USA	Kris Reaves
22	DF	USA	Sebastian Anderson
23	MF	MEX	Uvaldo Luna
28	MF	USA	Will Vint
30	GK	USA	Abraham Rodriguez
31	DF	USA	Alejandro Padilla
44	DF	USA	Jordan Burt
77	MF	JAM	Andre Lewis

On loan from MLS affiliate Colorado Rapids.
Colorado Rapids academy player.

== Competitions ==
=== Exhibitions ===
February 5 Preseason 1	Colorado Rapids U-19s	1–2	Colorado Springs Switchbacks	Commerce City, Colorado
1:00 PM MST	(1st half)	Report	Daniels (1st half); Ferreira (2nd half)	Stadium: Dick's Sporting Goods Park - Turf Field

February 8 Preseason 2	New Mexico United	v	Colorado Springs Switchbacks	Albuquerque, New Mexico
12:00 PM MST		Report		Stadium: UNM Soccer Complex
Note: Canceled due to snow and road conditions.

February 16 Preseason 3	Louisville City	3–0	Colorado Springs Switchbacks	Herriman, Utah
7:00 PM MST	Lancaster 9', 22'; Thiam 90'	Report		Stadium: Zions Bank Stadium

February 19 Preseason 4	Real Monarchs	0–0	Colorado Springs Switchbacks	Herriman, Utah
10:00 AM MST		Report		Stadium: Zions Bank Stadium

February 22 Preseason 5	Union Omaha	1–0	Colorado Springs Switchbacks	Herriman, Utah
11:30 AM MST		Report		Stadium: Zions Bank Stadium

February 29 Preseason 6	Air Force Falcons	v	Colorado Springs Switchbacks	Colorado Springs, Colorado
1:00 PM MST				Stadium: Cadet Soccer Stadium

March 1 Preseason 7	Colorado Springs Switchbacks	v	Denver Pioneers	Colorado Springs, Colorado
2:00 PM MST				Stadium: Weidner Field

=== USL Championship ===
==== Standings — Group C ====
Pos	Team	Pld	W	D	L	GF	GA	GD	Pts	PPG	Qualification
1	El Paso Locomotive FC	16	9	5	2	24	14	+10	32	2.00	Advance to USL Championship Playoffs
2	New Mexico United	15	8	3	4	23	17	+6	27	1.80	Advance to USL Championship Playoffs
3	Colorado Springs Switchbacks FC	16	2	7	7	19	28	−9	13	0.81	
4	Real Monarchs	16	3	2	11	14	25	−11	11	0.69	

Source: USL

==== Match results ====
On January 9, 2020, the USL announced the 2020 season schedule. In the preparations for the resumption of league play following the shutdown prompted by the COVID-19 pandemic, the remainder of the Switchbacks' schedule was announced on July 2.

March 7 1	OKC Energy	1–2	Colorado Springs Switchbacks FC	Oklahoma City, Oklahoma
7:00 PM MST	Ward (yellow card) 53'; Harris 58'; Chavez (yellow card) 62'	Report	Volesky 16'; Lewis (yellow card) 33'; Stephenson 78' (o.g.); Diz Pe (yellow card) 90+5'	Stadium: Taft Stadium; Attendance: 4,067; Referee: Eric Tattersall

July 11 2 Four Corners Cup	Colorado Springs Switchbacks FC	1–2	New Mexico United	Colorado Springs, Colorado
5:00 PM MDT	Daniels 45+2'	Report	Muhammad 25'; Wehan (yellow card) 56', (goal) 87'	Stadium: Weidner Field; Attendance: 1,000; Referee: Laura Rodriguez

July 18 3 Four Corners Cup	Real Monarchs	3–3	Colorado Springs Switchbacks FC	Sandy, Utah
2:00 PM MDT	Coffee 30'; Brody 40'; Farnsworth (yellow card) 49'; Peay 61'	Report	Cervós 45+3'; Lewis (yellow card) 51' (yellow-red card) 73'; Burt 89'; Rwatubyaye 90+5', (yellow card) 90+5'	Stadium: Rio Tinto Stadium; Referee: Michael Radchuk

July 26 4	Colorado Springs Switchbacks FC	P–P	Austin Bold FC	Colorado Springs, Colorado
1:00 PM MDT				Stadium: Weidner Field

August 1 5 Four Corners Cup	Colorado Springs Switchbacks FC	1–2	Real Monarchs	Colorado Springs, Colorado
6:00 PM MDT	Burt (yellow card) 2'; Lebese 57' (pen.); Diz Pe (yellow card) 90+2'	Report	Blake 35' (pen.); Davis (yellow card) 67'; Peay 90+3'; Sierakowski (yellow card) 90+5'	Stadium: Weidner Field; Attendance: 1,000; Referee: Malik Badawi

August 8 6	El Paso Locomotive FC	4–2	Colorado Springs Switchbacks FC	El Paso, Texas
7:30 PM MDT	Mares 15', (yellow card) 90+2'; Gómez 21'; Diaz (yellow card) 23'; Herrera 66', 68'	Report	Reaves (yellow card) 14'; Quintero (yellow card) 36'; Luna 82', 90+1'; Burt (yellow card) 87'	Stadium: Southwest University Park; Referee: Jonathan Bilinski

August 15 7 Four Corners Cup	New Mexico United	0–1	Colorado Springs Switchbacks FC	Albuquerque, New Mexico
3:00 PM MDT	Rubio (yellow card) 63'; Ferreira (yellow card) 90+4'	Report	Tinari (yellow card) 30'; Wehan 45'; Najem (yellow card) 66'; Ryden (yellow card) 90+1'	Stadium: Isotopes Park; Attendance: 1,000; Referee: Malik Badawi

August 22 8	Colorado Springs Switchbacks FC	0–0	El Paso Locomotive FC	Colorado Springs, Colorado
5:00 PM MDT	Quintero (yellow card) 18'; Volesky (yellow card) 89'	Report	King (yellow card) 16'; Rebellón (yellow card) 51'; Ryan (yellow card) 82'	Stadium: Weidner Field; Attendance: 1,000; Referee: Laura Rodriguez

August 26 4	Colorado Springs Switchbacks FC	4–4	Austin Bold FC	Colorado Springs, Colorado
6:00 PM MDT	Volesky 48', 64'; Lewis 59'; Lebese 84'; Kurimoto (yellow card) 86'	Report	Forbes 2', 45'; Kléber 3', (yellow card) 89'; Báez 38'; Twumasi (yellow card) 75'; Okugo (yellow card) 86'	Stadium: Weidner Field; Attendance: 1,000; Referee: Ismir Pekmic

August 29 9 Four Corners Cup	Colorado Springs Switchbacks FC	1–1	New Mexico United	Colorado Springs, Colorado
5:00 PM MDT	Lewis (yellow card) 54'; Daniels 59'	Report	Tinari (yellow card) 37'; Moreno 54' (pen.); Williams (yellow card) 65' (yellow-red card) 75'; Mizell (yellow card) 90+3'	Stadium: Weidner Field; Attendance: 1,000; Referee: Farhad Dadkho

September 2 10	Colorado Springs Switchbacks FC	P–P	El Paso Locomotive FC	Colorado Springs, Colorado
5:00 PM MDT				Stadium: Weidner Field
Note: Match postponed due to the COVID exposure of a person in the Switchbacks' organization.

September 5 11	Colorado Springs Switchbacks FC	0–0	OKC Energy FC	Colorado Springs, Colorado
5:00 PM MDT	Argueta (yellow card) 89'	Report	Hernández (yellow card) 34'; Taravel (yellow card) 90+2'; Ellis-Hayden (red card) 90+9'	Stadium: Weidner Field; Attendance: 1,000; Referee: Calin Radosav

September 9 12 Four Corners Cup	Real Monarchs	4–1	Colorado Springs Switchbacks FC	Sandy, Utah
8:00 PM MDT	Vázquez 18'; Brown 26'; Davis 69'; Powder 76'	Report	Daniels 88', (yellow card) 34'	Stadium: Rio Tinto Stadium; Referee: Brad Jensen

September 16 13	El Paso Locomotive FC	2–0	Colorado Springs Switchbacks FC	El Paso, Texas
7:00 PM MDT	Robinson 53'; King (yellow card) 57'; Salgado 74'; Monsalvez (yellow card) 85'	Report	Daniels (yellow card) 26'	Stadium: Southwest University Park; Referee: Marco Vega

September 19 14 Four Corners Cup	New Mexico United	1–2	Colorado Springs Switchbacks FC	Albuquerque, New Mexico
3:30 PM MDT	Sandoval 28'; Moreno (yellow card) 64'	Report	Volesky 45+1' (pen.), (yellow card) 45+2'; Ferreira 48'; Daniels (yellow card) 88'	Stadium: Isotopes Park; Referee: Elton Garcia

September 26 15 Four Corners Cup	Colorado Springs Switchbacks FC	1–1	Real Monarchs	Colorado Springs, Colorado
6:00 PM MDT	Volesky (yellow card) 11', (goal) 42' (pen.); Cervós (yellow card) 45'	Report	Davis 21'; Brown (yellow card) 47'	Stadium: Weidner Field; Attendance: 700; Referee: Adam Kilpatrick

September 30 10	Colorado Springs Switchbacks FC	0–0	El Paso Locomotive FC	Colorado Springs, Colorado
7:00 PM MDT	Quintero (yellow card) 11'	Report	Robinson (yellow card) 57'	Stadium: Weidner Field; Referee: Elvis Osmanovic
Note: Reschedule of postponed match from September 2nd.

October 3 16	FC Tulsa	2–0	Colorado Springs Switchbacks FC	Tulsa, Oklahoma
6:00 PM MDT	Marlon 36', (yellow card) 38' da Costa 40'; Martínez (yellow card) 65'; Bourgeois (yellow card) 86'	Report	Diz Pe (yellow card) 43' (yellow-red card) 90+6'; Kurimoto (yellow card) 68'; Burt (yellow card) 81'	Stadium: ONEOK Field; Attendance: 3,128; Referee: Matthew Corrigan

=== U.S. Open Cup ===
As a USL Championship club, the Switchbacks will enter the competition in the Second Round, to be played April 7–9.

April 8 2nd round	FC Boulder Harpos (LQ) (Colorado) or Switchbacks FC (USLC) (Colorado)	P–P	(Colorado) Switchbacks FC (USLC) or (Washington (state)) Crossfire Redmond (NPSL)	Denver, Colorado or Colorado Springs, Colorado
7:00 pm MDT				Stadium: Regency Athletic Complex at MSU Denver or Weidner Field
Note: Match postponed due to the COVID-19 pandemic
