= List of Major League Soccer transfers 2020 =

The following is a list of transfers for the 2020 Major League Soccer (MLS) season that were made during the 2019–20 MLS offseason all the way through to the roster freeze on October 29, 2020.

== Transfers ==
List of 2020 MLS transfers
Date	Name	Moving from	Moving to	Mode of Transfer
September 21, 2019	(United States) Chris Duvall	Houston Dynamo	(United States) OKC Energy	Free
October 1, 2019	(Jamaica) Giles Barnes	Colorado Rapids	(India) Hyderabad	Free
October 3, 2019	(United States) Moses Nyeman	(United States) Loudoun United	D.C. United	Homegrown player
October 3, 2019	(United States) Moses Nyeman	D.C. United	(United States) Loudoun United	Loan
November 5, 2019	(United States) Casey Walls	(United States) San Jose Earthquakes Academy	San Jose Earthquakes	Homegrown player
November 8, 2019	(United States) Damian Rivera	(United States) New England Revolution Academy	New England Revolution	Homegrown player
November 11, 2019	(United States) Emmanuel Ochoa	(United States) San Jose Earthquakes Academy	San Jose Earthquakes	Homegrown player
November 11, 2019	(Mexico) Víctor Ulloa	FC Cincinnati	Inter Miami CF	Trade
November 12, 2019	(United States) Dax McCarty	Chicago Fire FC	Nashville SC	Trade
November 12, 2019	(United States) David Romney	LA Galaxy	Nashville SC	Trade
November 13, 2019	(Canada) Jay Chapman	Toronto FC	Inter Miami CF	Trade
November 13, 2019	(United States) Marlon Hairston	Houston Dynamo	Minnesota United FC	Trade
November 13, 2019	(United States) Darlington Nagbe	Atlanta United FC	Columbus Crew	Trade
November 13, 2019	(Colombia) Darwin Quintero	Minnesota United FC	Houston Dynamo	Trade
November 14, 2019	(United States) Grant Lillard	Chicago Fire FC	Inter Miami CF	Trade
November 18, 2019	(United States) Jerome Kiesewetter	(United States) El Paso Locomotive	Inter Miami CF	Transfer
November 19, 2019	(United States) Jalil Anibaba	New England Revolution	Nashville SC	Expansion Draft
November 19, 2019	(United States) Luis Argudo	Columbus Crew	Inter Miami CF	Expansion Draft
November 19, 2019	(Ghana) Abu Danladi	Minnesota United FC	Nashville SC	Expansion Draft
November 19, 2019	(United States) Daniel Lovitz	Montreal Impact	Nashville SC	Trade
November 19, 2019	(Colombia) Jimmy Medranda	Sporting Kansas City	Nashville SC	Expansion Draft
November 19, 2019	(United States) Bryan Meredith	Seattle Sounders FC	Inter Miami CF	Expansion Draft
November 19, 2019	(United States) Lee Nguyen	Los Angeles FC	Inter Miami CF	Expansion Draft
November 19, 2019	(Jamaica) Alvas Powell	FC Cincinnati	Inter Miami CF	Expansion Draft
November 19, 2019	(United States) Ben Sweat	New York City FC	Inter Miami CF	Expansion Draft
November 19, 2019	(United States) Zarek Valentin	Portland Timbers	Nashville SC	Expansion Draft
November 19, 2019	(United States) Zarek Valentin	Nashville SC	Houston Dynamo	Trade
November 19, 2019	(United States) Brandon Vazquez	Atlanta United FC	Nashville SC	Expansion Draft
November 19, 2019	(United States) Brandon Vazquez	Nashville SC	FC Cincinnati	Trade
November 19, 2019	(United States) Joe Willis	Houston Dynamo	Nashville SC	Trade
November 19, 2019	(United States) Adrian Zendejas	Sporting Kansas City	Nashville SC	Trade
November 20, 2019	(Ghana) Lalas Abubakar	Columbus Crew	Colorado Rapids	Trade
November 20, 2019	(Argentina) Víctor Cabrera	Montreal Impact	Houston Dynamo	Trade
November 20, 2019	(Canada) Doneil Henry	Vancouver Whitecaps FC	(South Korea) Suwon Samsung Bluewings	Transfer
November 20, 2019	(Honduras) Romell Quioto	Houston Dynamo	Montreal Impact	Trade
November 20, 2019	(United States) Auston Trusty	Philadelphia Union	Colorado Rapids	Trade
November 21, 2019	(Palestine) Nazmi Albadawi	FC Cincinnati	(United States) North Carolina FC	Transfer
November 21, 2019	(Cuba) Maikel Chang	(United States) Real Monarchs	Real Salt Lake	Transfer
November 21, 2019	(Algeria) Saphir Taïder	(Italy) Bologna	Montreal Impact	Transfer
November 22, 2019	(United States) Matt LaGrassa	(United States) Nashville SC (USL)	Nashville SC	Transfer
November 22, 2019	(Brazil) Ruan	(Brazil) Barra da Tijuca	Orlando City SC	Transfer
November 22, 2019	(United States) Ken Tribbett	(United States) Nashville SC (USL)	Nashville SC	Transfer
November 22, 2019	(United States) Taylor Washington	(United States) Nashville SC (USL)	Nashville SC	Transfer
November 22, 2019	(United States) Alan Winn	(United States) Nashville SC (USL)	Nashville SC	Transfer
November 25, 2019	(United States) Danilo Acosta	Real Salt Lake	LA Galaxy	Waiver Draft
November 25, 2019	(United States) Jeff Caldwell	New York City FC	New England Revolution	Waiver Draft
November 25, 2019	(Bosnia and Herzegovina) Haris Medunjanin	Philadelphia Union	FC Cincinnati	Waiver Draft
November 25, 2019	(Trinidad and Tobago) Greg Ranjitsingh	Orlando City SC	Minnesota United FC	Waiver Draft
November 26, 2019	(United States) Mikey Ambrose	Atlanta United FC	Inter Miami CF	Re-Entry Draft
November 26, 2019	(United States) Stefan Cleveland	Chicago Fire FC	Seattle Sounders FC	Trade
November 26, 2019	(United States) Tayvon Gray	(United States) New York City Academy	New York City FC	Homegrown player
November 26, 2019	(United States) Kendall McIntosh	Portland Timbers	New York Red Bulls	Re-Entry Draft
November 26, 2019	(United States) Eric Miller	New York City FC	Nashville SC	Re-Entry Draft
November 26, 2019	(United States) Fafà Picault	Philadelphia Union	FC Dallas	Trade
November 26, 2019	(Mexico) Richard Sánchez	Chicago Fire FC	Sporting Kansas City	Re-Entry Draft
November 27, 2019	(United States) Drew Moor	Toronto FC	Colorado Rapids	Free
November 30, 2019	(United States) Corben Bone	FC Cincinnati	(United States) Louisville City	Free
December 2, 2019	(Senegal) Dominique Badji	FC Dallas	Nashville SC	Trade
December 2, 2019	(Brazil) Fernando Bob	Minnesota United FC	(Brazil) Boavista	Free
December 2, 2019	(Guam) A. J. DeLaGarza	Houston Dynamo	Inter Miami CF	Free
December 2, 2019	(United States) Brooks Lennon	Real Salt Lake	Atlanta United FC	Trade
December 2, 2019	(United States) Luis Robles	New York Red Bulls	Inter Miami CF	Free
December 3, 2019	(United States) Saad Abdul-Salaam	Seattle Sounders FC	FC Cincinnati	Re-Entry Draft
December 3, 2019	(United States) Juan Agudelo	New England Revolution	Toronto FC	Re-Entry Draft
December 4, 2019	(Honduras) Brayan Beckeles	(Honduras) Olimpia	Nashville SC	Transfer
December 4, 2019	(Brazil) Everton Luiz	(Italy) SPAL	Real Salt Lake	Transfer
December 4, 2019	(United States) John McCarthy	(United States) Tampa Bay Rowdies	Inter Miami CF	Free
December 4, 2019	(Croatia) Roberto Punčec	(Croatia) Rijeka	Sporting Kansas City	Transfer
December 4, 2019	(United States) Kelyn Rowe	Real Salt Lake	New England Revolution	Free
December 4, 2019	(Sweden) Axel Sjöberg	Colorado Rapids	Columbus Crew	Waivers
December 5, 2019	(United States) Amando Moreno	Chicago Fire FC	(United States) New Mexico United	Free
December 5, 2019	(United States) Jimmy Ockford	San Jose Earthquakes	(United States) Louisville City	Free
December 6, 2019	(Panama) Michael Amir Murillo	New York Red Bulls	(Belgium) Anderlecht	Transfer
December 9, 2019	(United States) Bill Hamid	(Denmark) Midtjylland	D.C. United	Transfer
December 9, 2019	(United States) Emerson Hyndman	(England) Bournemouth	Atlanta United FC	Transfer
December 9, 2019	(Trinidad and Tobago) Alvin Jones	(United States) OKC Energy	Real Salt Lake	Transfer
December 9, 2019	(United States) David Loera	(United States) NC State Wolfpack	Orlando City SC	Homegrown player
December 9, 2019	(Colombia) Andrés Perea	(Colombia) Atlético Nacional	Orlando City SC	Loan
December 9, 2019	(United States) Sebastian Saucedo	Real Salt Lake	(Mexico) UNAM	Free
December 9, 2019	(United States) Khiry Shelton	(Germany) Paderborn 07	Sporting Kansas City	Transfer
December 10, 2019	(United States) Danny Musovski	(United States) Reno 1868	Los Angeles FC	Transfer
December 10, 2019	(Mexico) Alan Pulido	(Mexico) Guadalajara	Sporting Kansas City	Transfer
December 10, 2019	(United States) Nicholas Slonina	(United States) Chicago Fire Academy	Chicago Fire FC	Homegrown player
December 11, 2019	(Argentina) Cristian Espinoza	(Spain) Villarreal	San Jose Earthquakes	Transfer
December 11, 2019	(United States) Sacha Kljestan	Orlando City SC	LA Galaxy	Free
December 12, 2019	(Spain) Jon Bakero	Toronto FC	(United States) Phoenix Rising	Free
December 12, 2019	(United States) Jordan Bender	(United States) Orlando City B	Orlando City SC	Homegrown player
December 12, 2019	(United States) Matt Lampson	LA Galaxy	Columbus Crew	Free
December 16, 2019	(Canada) Lucas Cavallini	(Mexico) Puebla	Vancouver Whitecaps FC	Transfer
December 16, 2019	(United States) Kevin Partida	San Jose Earthquakes	(United States) Reno 1868	Free
December 17, 2019	(Costa Rica) David Guzmán	Columbus Crew	(Costa Rica) Saprissa	Free
December 17, 2019	(Colombia) Cristian Higuita	Orlando City SC	(Colombia) Atlético Junior	Free
December 17, 2019	(United States) Forrest Lasso	FC Cincinnati	(United States) Tampa Bay Rowdies	Transfer
December 17, 2019	(United States) Zac MacMath	Vancouver Whitecaps FC	Real Salt Lake	Trade
December 17, 2019	(Sweden) Tom Pettersson	(Sweden) Östersund	FC Cincinnati	Free
December 17, 2019	(United States) Seth Sinovic	Sporting Kansas City	New England Revolution	Free
December 18, 2019	(Netherlands) Vito Wormgoor	(Norway) Brann	Columbus Crew	Free
December 20, 2019	(Poland) Adam Buksa	(Poland) Pogoń Szczecin	New England Revolution	Transfer
December 20, 2019	(Canada) Brian Wright	New England Revolution	(United States) Birmingham Legion	Free
December 20, 2019	(Argentina) Lucas Zelarayán	(Mexico) UANL	Columbus Crew	Transfer
December 23, 2019	(United States) Drake Callender	(United States) California Golden Bears	Inter Miami CF	Homegrown player
December 23, 2019	(United States) Alex Crognale	Columbus Crew	(United States) Birmingham Legion	Free
December 23, 2019	(Canada) Aidan Daniels	Toronto FC	(United States) Colorado Springs Switchbacks	Free
December 23, 2019	(Venezuela) José Martínez	(Venezuela) Zulia	Philadelphia Union	Transfer
December 23, 2019	(Argentina) Rodrigo Schlegel	(Argentina) Racing	Orlando City SC	Loan
December 23, 2019	(United States) Blake Smith	FC Cincinnati	(United States) San Antonio FC	Free
December 23, 2019	(Haiti) Denso Ulysse	(United States) Tacoma Defiance	Inter Miami CF	Transfer
December 26, 2019	(United States) Eric Bird	Houston Dynamo	(United States) FC Tulsa	Free
December 27, 2019	(Panama) Harold Cummings	San Jose Earthquakes	(Chile) Unión Española	Free
December 27, 2019	(Sweden) Zlatan Ibrahimović	LA Galaxy	(Italy) Milan	Free
December 28, 2019	(United States) Juan Agudelo	Toronto FC	Inter Miami CF	Trade
December 29, 2019	(Panama) Román Torres	Seattle Sounders FC	Inter Miami CF	Free
December 30, 2019	(Chile) Pablo Aránguiz	FC Dallas	Universidad de Chile	Loan
December 30, 2019	(Brazil) Antônio Carlos	(Brazil) Palmeiras	Orlando City SC	Loan
December 31, 2019	(Guatemala) Moisés Hernández	FC Dallas	(Guatemala) Antigua GFC	Free
December 31, 2019	(Serbia) Aleksandar Katai	Chicago Fire FC	LA Galaxy	Trade
December 31, 2019	(Uruguay) Diego Polenta	LA Galaxy	(Paraguay) Olimpia	Free
January 1, 2020	(Ghana) David Accam	Columbus Crew	Nashville SC	Trade
January 1, 2020	(United States) George Acosta	(United States) Austin Bold	Inter Miami CF	Transfer
January 1, 2020	(Argentina) Luciano Acosta	D.C. United	(Mexico) Atlas	Free
January 1, 2020	(Argentina) Yamil Asad	(Argentina) Vélez Sarsfield	D.C. United	Free
January 1, 2020	(Netherlands) Alexander Büttner	(Netherlands) Vitesse	New England Revolution	Transfer
January 1, 2020	(United States) George Campbell	(United States) Atlanta United 2	Atlanta United FC	Homegrown player
January 1, 2020	(United States) Jack de Vries	(United States) Bethlehem Steel	Philadelphia Union	Homegrown player
January 1, 2020	(Uruguay) Francisco Ginella	(Uruguay) Montevideo Wanderers	Los Angeles FC	Transfer
January 1, 2020	(Panama) Aníbal Godoy	San Jose Earthquakes	Nashville SC	Trade
January 1, 2020	(Brazil) Judson	(Brazil) Tombense	San Jose Earthquakes	Transfer
January 1, 2020	(Costa Rica) Randall Leal	(Costa Rica) Saprissa	Nashville SC	Transfer
January 1, 2020	(Venezuela) Christian Makoun	(Venezuela) Zamora	Inter Miami CF	Transfer
January 1, 2020	(Spain) Álvaro Medrán	(Spain) Valencia	Chicago Fire FC	Free
January 1, 2020	(Germany) Hany Mukhtar	(Denmark) Brøndby	Nashville SC	Transfer
January 1, 2020	(Colombia) Miguel Nazarit	(Colombia) Once Caldas	Nashville SC	Transfer
January 1, 2020	(Canada) David Norman Jr.	Vancouver Whitecaps FC	Inter Miami CF	Trade
January 1, 2020	(England) Wayne Rooney	D.C. United	(England) Derby County	Transfer
January 1, 2020	(Brazil) Thiago Santos	(Brazil) Palmeiras	FC Dallas	Transfer
January 1, 2020	(United States) Cole Turner	(United States) Bethlehem Steel	Philadelphia Union	Homegrown player
January 1, 2020	(Jamaica) Romario Williams	Columbus Crew	(United States) Miami FC	Free
January 1, 2020	(Croatia) Dario Župarić	(Croatia) Rijeka	Portland Timbers	Transfer
January 2, 2020	(Colombia) Yimmi Chará	(Brazil) Atlético Mineiro	Portland Timbers	Transfer
January 2, 2020	(Albania) Shkëlzen Gashi	Colorado Rapids	(Switzerland) Aarau	Free
January 2, 2020	(Argentina) Emiliano Insúa	(Germany) VfB Stuttgart	LA Galaxy	Transfer
January 5, 2020	(Venezuela) Anthony Blondell	Vancouver Whitecaps FC	(Chile) Huachipato	Free
January 6, 2020	(United States) Connor Maloney	Columbus Crew	(United States) San Antonio FC	Free
January 6, 2020	(Canada) Sean Melvin	Vancouver Whitecaps FC	(United States) Colorado Springs Switchbacks	Free
January 6, 2020	(United States) Marcelo Palomino	(United States) Houston Dynamo Academy	Houston Dynamo	Homegrown player
January 7, 2020	(United States) Chris Lema	(United States) New York Red Bulls II	New York Red Bulls	Free
January 7, 2020	(United States) Jared Stroud	(United States) New York Red Bulls II	New York Red Bulls	Free
January 8, 2020	(Venezuela) José Hernández	Atlanta United FC	Atlético Venezuela	Free
January 8, 2020	(United States) Tomas Hilliard-Arce	LA Galaxy	(United States) Sacramento Republic	Free
January 8, 2020	(United States) Keaton Parks	(Portugal) Benfica	New York City FC	Transfer
January 8, 2020	(El Salvador) Rodolfo Zelaya	Los Angeles FC	(Mexico) Celaya	Free
January 9, 2020	(Peru) Carlos Ascues	Orlando City SC	(Peru) Alianza Lima	Free
January 9, 2020	(United States) Daryl Dike	(United States) Virginia Cavaliers	Orlando City SC	SuperDraft
January 9, 2020	(United States) Henry Kessler	(United States) Virginia Cavaliers	New England Revolution	SuperDraft
January 9, 2020	(Japan) Yuya Kubo	(Belgium) Gent	FC Cincinnati	Transfer
January 9, 2020	(United States) Jack Maher	(United States) Indiana Hoosiers	Nashville SC	SuperDraft
January 9, 2020	(Canada) Ryan Raposo	(United States) Syracuse Orange	Vancouver Whitecaps FC	SuperDraft
January 9, 2020	(United States) Robbie Robinson	(United States) Clemson Tigers	Inter Miami CF	SuperDraft
January 9, 2020	(Chile) Jeisson Vargas	Montreal Impact	(Chile) Unión La Calera	Free
January 9, 2020	(England) Anton Walkes	(England) Portsmouth	Atlanta United FC	Transfer
January 10, 2020	(United States) Amadou Dia	(United States) Phoenix Rising	Sporting Kansas City	Transfer
January 10, 2020	(Argentina) Brian Fernández	Portland Timbers	(Argentina) Colón	Free
January 10, 2020	(Argentina) Leandro González Pírez	Atlanta United FC	(Mexico) Tijuana	Transfer
January 10, 2020	(Cape Verde) Jamiro	(France) Metz	Philadelphia Union	Transfer
January 10, 2020	(Argentina) Fernando Meza	(Mexico) Necaxa	Atlanta United FC	Transfer
January 10, 2020	(Portugal) João Pedro	LA Galaxy	(Portugal) Tondela	Free
January 10, 2020	(United States) Dillon Powers	Orlando City SC	(Scotland) Dundee United	Free
January 11, 2020	(Finland) Rasmus Schüller	Minnesota United FC	(Finland) HJK Helsinki	Free
January 11, 2020	(United States) Gedion Zelalem	Sporting Kansas City	New York City FC	Free
January 13, 2020	(Switzerland) Leonardo Bertone	FC Cincinnati	(Switzerland) Thun	Transfer
January 13, 2020	(Ecuador) José Cifuentes	(Ecuador) América de Quito	Los Angeles FC	Transfer
January 13, 2020	(Croatia) Marko Marić	(Germany) 1899 Hoffenheim	Houston Dynamo	Transfer
January 13, 2020	(United States) Eddie Munjoma	(United States) SMU Mustangs	FC Dallas	Homegrown player
January 13, 2020	(Brazil) Júnior Urso	(Brazil) Corinthians	Orlando City SC	Transfer
January 14, 2020	(Colombia) Daniel Bedoya	New York City FC	(Dominican Republic) Atlético Pantoja	Free
January 14, 2020	(France) Nicolas Benezet	(France) Guingamp	Colorado Rapids	Transfer
January 14, 2020	(Peru) Edison Flores	(Mexico) Morelia	D.C. United	Transfer
January 14, 2020	(Liechtenstein) Nicolas Hasler	Sporting Kansas City	(Switzerland) Thun	Free
January 14, 2020	(United States) Aidan Morris	(United States) Indiana Hoosiers	Columbus Crew	Homegrown player
January 14, 2020	(United States) Shane O'Neill	Orlando City SC	Seattle Sounders FC	Free
January 14, 2020	(United States) John Tolkin	(United States) New York Red Bulls Academy	New York Red Bulls	Homegrown player
January 14, 2020	(Canada) Joel Waterman	(Canada) Cavalry FC	Montreal Impact	Transfer
January 15, 2020	(Cameroon) Brian Anunga	(United States) Charleston Battery	Nashville SC	Transfer
January 15, 2020	(United States) Marcus Epps	New York Red Bulls	(United States) Portland Timbers 2	Free
January 15, 2020	(Spain) Jon Erice	Vancouver Whitecaps FC	(Spain) Albacete	Free
January 15, 2020	(United States) Milan Iloski	(United States) UCLA Bruins	Real Salt Lake	Homegrown player
January 15, 2020	(Canada) Daniel Kinumbe	Montreal Impact	(Canada) HFX Wanderers	Free
January 15, 2020	(Japan) Ken Krolicki	Montreal Impact	(United States) Portland Timbers 2	Free
January 15, 2020	(United States) Eric Lopez	(United States) LA Galaxy II	LA Galaxy	Homegrown player
January 15, 2020	(Denmark) Younes Namli	(Russia) Krasnodar	Colorado Rapids	Loan
January 15, 2020	(Canada) Ballou Tabla	(Spain) Barcelona B	Montreal Impact	Transfer
January 15, 2020	(Netherlands) Kenneth Vermeer	(Netherlands) Feyenoord	Los Angeles FC	Transfer
January 16, 2020	(Paraguay) Cristian Colmán	FC Dallas	(Ecuador) Barcelona	Loan
January 16, 2020	(Argentina) Braian Galván	(Argentina) Colón	Colorado Rapids	Transfer
January 16, 2020	(Chile) Cristián Gutiérrez	(Chile) Colo-Colo	Vancouver Whitecaps FC	Free
January 16, 2020	(Brazil) Marcelo	Chicago Fire FC	(Portugal) Paços de Ferreira	Free
January 16, 2020	(United States) Tyler Miller	Los Angeles FC	Minnesota United FC	Trade
January 16, 2020	(Kenya) Lawrence Olum	Minnesota United FC	(United States) Miami FC	Free
January 17, 2020	(United States) Sebastian Berhalter	(United States) Columbus Crew Academy	Columbus Crew	Homegrown player
January 17, 2020	(United States) Edgar Castillo	New England Revolution	Atlanta United FC	Free
January 17, 2020	(Colombia) Cristian Dájome	(Colombia) Atlético Nacional	Vancouver Whitecaps FC	Transfer
January 17, 2020	(Peru) Pedro Gallese	(Mexico) Veracruz	Orlando City SC	Free
January 17, 2020	(New Zealand) James Musa	(United States) Phoenix Rising	Minnesota United FC	Transfer
January 17, 2020	(United States) Kevin Paredes	(United States) Loudoun United	D.C. United	Homegrown player
January 17, 2020	(United States) Mauricio Pineda	(United States) North Carolina Tar Heels	Chicago Fire FC	Homegrown player
January 18, 2020	(Slovenia) Robert Berić	(France) Saint-Étienne	Chicago Fire FC	Transfer
January 18, 2020	(Panama) Cristian Martínez	Chicago Fire FC	(Spain) Cádiz	Free
January 20, 2020	(United States) Bobby Edwards	(Northern Ireland) Portadown	FC Cincinnati	Transfer
January 20, 2020	(Slovakia) Matej Oravec	(Slovakia) Dunajská Streda	Philadelphia Union	Transfer
January 20, 2020	(United States) Connor Sparrow	(United States) Nashville SC (USL)	Chicago Fire FC	Free
January 21, 2020	(France) Vincent Bezecourt	New York Red Bulls	(United States) Miami FC	Free
January 21, 2020	(Germany) Julian Gressel	Atlanta United FC	D.C. United	Trade
January 21, 2020	(United States) Adam Grinwis	Orlando City SC	(United States) Sacramento Republic	Free
January 21, 2020	(United States) Jacori Hayes	FC Dallas	Minnesota United FC	Trade
January 21, 2020	(Mexico) Javier Hernández	(Spain) Sevilla	LA Galaxy	Transfer
January 21, 2020	(United States) Adam Jahn	(United States) Phoenix Rising	Atlanta United FC	Transfer
January 21, 2020	(United States) Lagos Kunga	Atlanta United FC	(United States) Phoenix Rising	Loan
January 21, 2020	(United States) Evan Louro	New York Red Bulls	(United States) Tampa Bay Rowdies	Free
January 21, 2020	(Germany) Ben Lundt	FC Cincinnati	(United States) Louisville City	Loan
January 21, 2020	(Canada) Thomas Meilleur-Giguère	Montreal Impact	(Canada) Pacific FC	Free
January 21, 2020	(Canada) Ashtone Morgan	Toronto FC	Real Salt Lake	Free
January 21, 2020	(Ghana) Leonard Owusu	(Israel) Ashdod	Vancouver Whitecaps FC	Transfer
January 21, 2020	(Canada) Rocco Romeo	(Canada) Toronto FC II	Toronto FC	Homegrown player
January 21, 2020	(England) Josh Sims	(England) Southampton	New York Red Bulls	Loan
January 22, 2020	(Luxembourg) Fred Emmings	(United States) Minnesota United Academy	Minnesota United FC	Homegrown player
January 22, 2020	(Argentina) Érik Godoy	(Argentina) Colón	Vancouver Whitecaps FC	Transfer
January 22, 2020	(The Gambia) Modou Jadama	Portland Timbers	(United States) Atlanta United 2	Free
January 22, 2020	(Canada) Jahkeele Marshall-Rutty	(Canada) Toronto FC II	Toronto FC	Homegrown player
January 22, 2020	(Brazil) PC	Vancouver Whitecaps FC	(United States) San Antonio FC	Free
January 23, 2020	(Canada) Gianfranco Facchineri	(Canada) Vancouver Whitecaps Academy	Vancouver Whitecaps FC	Homegrown player
January 23, 2020	(Israel) Gadi Kinda	(Israel) Beitar Jerusalem	Sporting Kansas City	Loan
January 23, 2020	(Canada) Patrick Metcalfe	(Canada) Whitecaps FC 2	Vancouver Whitecaps FC	Homegrown player
January 23, 2020	(Republic of Ireland) Jake Mulraney	(Scotland) Heart of Midlothian	Atlanta United FC	Transfer
January 23, 2020	(Canada) Jayden Nelson	(Canada) Toronto FC II	Toronto FC	Homegrown player
January 24, 2020	(United States) Blake Bodily	(United States) Portland Timbers U23s	Portland Timbers	Homegrown player
January 24, 2020	(United States) Andrew Carleton	Atlanta United FC	(United States) Indy Eleven	Loan
January 24, 2020	(United States) Cody Cropper	New England Revolution	Houston Dynamo	Free
January 24, 2020	(Haiti) Zachary Herivaux	New England Revolution	(United States) San Antonio FC	Free
January 24, 2020	(United States) Foster Langsdorf	Portland Timbers	(United States) Reno 1868	Free
January 24, 2020	(Nigeria) Orji Okwonkwo	(Italy) Bologna	Montreal Impact	Loan
January 25, 2020	(New Zealand) Kyle Adams	(United States) Rio Grande Valley Toros	Houston Dynamo	Free
January 25, 2020	(Canada) Zachary Brault-Guillard	(France) Lyon	Montreal Impact	Transfer
January 26, 2020	(United States) Bryce Duke	Real Salt Lake	Los Angeles FC	Trade
January 27, 2020	(Nigeria) Fanendo Adi	FC Cincinnati	Columbus Crew	Waivers
January 27, 2020	(United States) Ben Lundgaard	Columbus Crew	(United States) Atlanta United 2	Free
January 27, 2020	(France) David Milinković	(England) Hull City	Vancouver Whitecaps FC	Loan
January 27, 2020	(Venezuela) Miguel Navarro	(Venezuela) Deportivo La Guaira	Chicago Fire FC	Transfer
January 27, 2020	(Colombia) Ángelo Rodríguez	Minnesota United FC	(Colombia) Deportivo Cali	Free
January 28, 2020	(Mexico) Oswaldo Alanís	(Mexico) Guadalajara	San Jose Earthquakes	Loan
January 28, 2020	(Paraguay) Luis Amarilla	(Argentina) Vélez Sarsfield	Minnesota United FC	Loan
January 28, 2020	(United States) Jimmy Hague	FC Cincinnati	(United States) Memphis 901	Free
January 28, 2020	(Iceland) Gudmundur Thórarinsson	(Sweden) Norrköping	New York City FC	Transfer
January 29, 2020	(Denmark) David Jensen	(Netherlands) Utrecht	New York Red Bulls	Transfer
January 29, 2020	(Trinidad and Tobago) Ryan Telfer	Toronto FC	(Cyprus) Nea Salamis Famagusta	Free
January 30, 2020	(England) Mandela Egbo	(Germany) Darmstadt 98	New York Red Bulls	Transfer
January 30, 2020	(Argentina) Nicolás Figal	(Argentina) Independiente	Inter Miami CF	Transfer
January 30, 2020	(Ivory Coast) Jean-Christophe Koffi	New York Red Bulls	(United States) Memphis 901	Free
January 30, 2020	(Canada) Brett Levis	Vancouver Whitecaps FC	(Canada) Valour FC	Free
January 30, 2020	(United States) Bryan Meredith	Inter Miami CF	Vancouver Whitecaps FC	Trade
January 30, 2020	(Poland) Jarosław Niezgoda	(Poland) Legia Warsaw	Portland Timbers	Transfer
January 30, 2020	(Spain) Víctor Rodríguez	Seattle Sounders FC	(Spain) Elche	Free
January 30, 2020	(United States) Bobby Shuttleworth	Minnesota United FC	Chicago Fire FC	Free
January 31, 2020	(Argentina) Nicolás Gaitán	Chicago Fire FC	(France) Lille	Free
January 31, 2020	(Norway) Jakob Glesnes	(Norway) Strømsgodset	Philadelphia Union	Transfer
January 31, 2020	(United States) Bradford Jamieson IV	LA Galaxy	(Denmark) Vendsyssel	Free
January 31, 2020	(Jamaica) Kemar Lawrence	New York Red Bulls	(Belgium) Anderlecht	Transfer
January 31, 2020	(Chile) Felipe Mora	(Mexico) UNAM	Portland Timbers	Loan
January 31, 2020	(Scotland) Lewis Morgan	(Scotland) Celtic	Inter Miami CF	Transfer
January 31, 2020	(Brazil) João Paulo	(Brazil) Botafogo	Seattle Sounders FC	Transfer
January 31, 2020	(Norway) Jørgen Skjelvik	LA Galaxy	(Denmark) OB	Loan
January 31, 2020	(Argentina) Luis Solignac	Chicago Fire FC	(United States) San Antonio FC	Free
January 31, 2020	(United States) Wil Trapp	Columbus Crew	Inter Miami CF	Trade
January 31, 2020	(Paraguay) Héctor Villalba	Atlanta United FC	(Paraguay) Libertad	Transfer
February 1, 2020	(Cameroon) Hassan Ndam	FC Cincinnati	(United States) Miami FC	Loan
February 3, 2020	(Mexico) Marco Fabián	Philadelphia Union	(Qatar) Al-Sadd	Free
February 3, 2020	(Netherlands) Jürgen Locadia	(England) Brighton & Hove Albion	FC Cincinnati	Loan
February 3, 2020	(Brazil) Matheus Rossetto	(Brazil) Athletico Paranaense	Atlanta United FC	Transfer
February 4, 2020	(United States) Eric Dick	Sporting Kansas City	(United States) Phoenix Rising	Loan
February 4, 2020	(Haiti) Derrick Etienne	New York Red Bulls	Columbus Crew	Free
February 4, 2020	(Haiti) Steeven Saba	(Haiti) Violette	Montreal Impact	Transfer
February 5, 2020	(France) Yohan Croizet	Sporting Kansas City	(Belgium) OH Leuven	Free
February 5, 2020	(United States) Nick DePuy	(United States) LA Galaxy II	LA Galaxy	Free
February 5, 2020	(Colombia) Yeimar Gómez Andrade	(Argentina) Unión de Santa Fe	Seattle Sounders FC	Transfer
February 5, 2020	(United States) Collin Martin	Minnesota United FC	(United States) San Diego Loyal	Free
February 5, 2020	(Morocco) Adrien Regattin	(Turkey) Akhisarspor	FC Cincinnati	Free
February 6, 2020	(Canada) Jason Beaulieu	Montreal Impact	(Canada) HFX Wanderers	Free
February 6, 2020	(Jamaica) Cory Burke	Philadelphia Union	(Austria) St. Pölten	Loan
February 6, 2020	(England) Cameron Lancaster	Nashville SC	(United States) Louisville City	Loan
February 6, 2020	(United States) Cameron Lindley	Orlando City SC	(United States) Indy Eleven	Free
February 6, 2020	(Hungary) Nemanja Nikolić	Chicago Fire FC	(Hungary) Fehérvár	Free
February 6, 2020	(Paraguay) Cristhian Paredes	(Mexico) América	Portland Timbers	Transfer
February 6, 2020	(Venezuela) Jeizon Ramírez	(Venezuela) Deportivo Táchira	Real Salt Lake	Transfer
February 7, 2020	(Argentina) Pablo Piatti	(Spain) Espanyol	Toronto FC	Transfer
February 7, 2020	(Venezuela) Jefferson Savarino	Real Salt Lake	(Brazil) Atlético Mineiro	Transfer
February 8, 2020	(Senegal) Lamine Sané	Orlando City SC	(Netherlands) Utrecht	Free
February 9, 2020	(Serbia) Ranko Veselinović	(Serbia) Vojvodina	Vancouver Whitecaps FC	Loan
February 10, 2020	(United States) Christopher Garcia	(United States) Real Salt Lake Academy	Real Salt Lake	Homegrown player
February 10, 2020	(Argentina) Ignacio Piatti	Montreal Impact	(Argentina) San Lorenzo	Free
February 11, 2020	(Canada) Raheem Edwards	Chicago Fire FC	Minnesota United FC	Trade
February 11, 2020	(Argentina) Emanuel Maciel	(Argentina) San Lorenzo	Montreal Impact	Free
February 11, 2020	(Iraq) Justin Meram	Atlanta United FC	Real Salt Lake	Free
February 11, 2020	(Canada) Callum Montgomery	FC Dallas	(United States) San Antonio FC	Loan
February 11, 2020	(United States) Wyatt Omsberg	Minnesota United FC	Chicago Fire FC	Trade
February 11, 2020	(United States) Walker Zimmerman	Los Angeles FC	Nashville SC	Trade
February 12, 2020	(United States) Zico Bailey	(Denmark) Helsingør	FC Cincinnati	Homegrown player
February 12, 2020	(Uruguay) Manuel Castro	(Argentina) Estudiantes	Atlanta United FC	Loan
February 12, 2020	(United States) Logan Gdula	FC Cincinnati	(United States) Charleston Battery	Free
February 12, 2020	(United States) Aaron Schoenfeld	(Israel) Maccabi Tel Aviv	Minnesota United FC	Transfer
February 12, 2020	(Canada) Dayne St. Clair	Minnesota United FC	(United States) San Antonio FC	Loan
February 13, 2020	(Bolivia) Jairo Quinteros	(Spain) Valencia	Inter Miami CF	Transfer
February 13, 2020	(Bolivia) Jairo Quinteros	Inter Miami CF	(Bolivia) Bolívar	Loan
February 13, 2020	(Colombia) Andrés Reyes	(Colombia) Atlético Nacional	Inter Miami CF	Loan
February 14, 2020	(Uruguay) José Aja	(Chile) Unión Española	Minnesota United FC	Transfer
February 14, 2020	(Canada) Damiano Pecile	(Canada) Vancouver Whitecaps Academy	Vancouver Whitecaps FC	Homegrown player
February 14, 2020	(New Zealand) Winston Reid	(England) West Ham United	Sporting Kansas City	Loan
February 14, 2020	(England) Bradley Wright-Phillips	New York Red Bulls	Los Angeles FC	Free
February 15, 2020	(Slovakia) Boris Sekulić	(Poland) Górnik Zabrze	Chicago Fire FC	Transfer
February 15, 2020	(Venezuela) Eduardo Sosa	Columbus Crew	(United States) Fort Lauderdale CF	Free
February 17, 2020	(Mexico) Rodolfo Pizarro	(Mexico) Monterrey	Inter Miami CF	Transfer
February 18, 2020	(England) Luis Binks	(England) Tottenham Hotspur	Montreal Impact	Transfer
February 18, 2020	(United States) Nkosi Burgess	(United States) Seattle Redhawks	FC Dallas	SuperDraft
February 18, 2020	(United States) Phillip Goodrum	(United States) Atlanta United 2	Atlanta United FC	Short-term agreement
February 19, 2020	(Switzerland) François Affolter	San Jose Earthquakes	(Switzerland) Aarau	Free
February 19, 2020	(Argentina) Ignacio Aliseda	(Argentina) Defensa y Justicia	Chicago Fire FC	Transfer
February 19, 2020	(United States) Andrew Tarbell	San Jose Earthquakes	Columbus Crew	Trade
February 20, 2020	(Netherlands) Siem de Jong	(Netherlands) Ajax	FC Cincinnati	Free
February 20, 2020	(France) Claude Dielna	Portland Timbers	(Romania) U Craiova	Free
February 20, 2020	(United States) Cameron Dunbar	(United States) LA Galaxy Academy	LA Galaxy	Homegrown player
February 20, 2020	(United States) Miguel Ibarra	Minnesota United FC	Seattle Sounders FC	Free
February 20, 2020	(Denmark) David Ousted	Chicago Fire FC	(Sweden) Hammarby	Free
February 20, 2020	(United States) Abraham Rodriguez	(United States) Colorado Springs Switchbacks	Colorado Rapids	Homegrown player
February 20, 2020	(Serbia) Luka Stojanović	(Serbia) Čukarički	Chicago Fire FC	Transfer
February 21, 2020	(Nigeria) Ifunanyachi Achara	(United States) Georgetown Hoyas	Toronto FC	Superdraft
February 21, 2020	(United States) Sebastian Anderson	Colorado Rapids	(United States) Colorado Springs Switchbacks	Loan
February 21, 2020	(United States) Joey DeZart	(United States) Wake Forest Demon Deacons	Orlando City SC	Superdraft
February 21, 2020	(United States) Matt Hundley	Colorado Rapids	(United States) Memphis 901	Loan
February 21, 2020	(United States) Niki Jackson	Colorado Rapids	(United States) Colorado Springs Switchbacks	Loan
February 21, 2020	(United States) Rey Ortiz	(United States) Portland Pilots	FC Cincinnati	Superdraft
February 21, 2020	(Mexico) Jonathan Perez	(United States) LA Galaxy Academy	LA Galaxy	Homegrown player
February 21, 2020	(United States) Abraham Rodriguez	Colorado Rapids	(United States) Colorado Springs Switchbacks	Loan
February 21, 2020	(Rwanda) Abdul Rwatubyaye	Colorado Rapids	(United States) Colorado Springs Switchbacks	Loan
February 21, 2020	(New Zealand) Tommy Smith	Colorado Rapids	(England) Sunderland	Free
February 24, 2020	(Costa Rica) Diego Campos	Chicago Fire FC	(Norway) Jerv	Free
February 24, 2020	(Argentina) Gastón Giménez	(Argentina) Vélez Sarsfield	Chicago Fire FC	Transfer
February 24, 2020	(United States) John Pulskamp	(United States) Sporting Kansas City II	Sporting Kansas City	Homegrown player
February 25, 2020	(New Zealand) Noah Billingsley	(United States) UC Santa Barbara Gauchos	Minnesota United FC	Superdraft
February 25, 2020	(United States) Tanner Dieterich	(United States) Clemson Tigers	Nashville SC	Superdraft
February 25, 2020	(United States) Chris Duvall	(United States) OKC Energy	Portland Timbers	Free
February 25, 2020	(United States) Luke Haakenson	(United States) Creighton Bluejays	Nashville SC	Superdraft
February 25, 2020	(Canada) Alistair Johnston	(United States) Wake Forest Demon Deacons	Nashville SC	Superdraft
February 25, 2020	(South Korea) Kim Kee-hee	Seattle Sounders FC	(South Korea) Ulsan Hyundai	Free
February 25, 2020	(United States) Jeremy Kelly	(United States) North Carolina Tar Heels	Colorado Rapids	Superdraft
February 25, 2020	(United States) Elliot Panicco	(United States) Charlotte 49ers	Nashville SC	Superdraft
February 25, 2020	(Germany) Gordon Wild	D.C. United	LA Galaxy	Free
February 26, 2020	(Hungary) Krisztián Németh	Sporting Kansas City	(Slovakia) Dunajská Streda	Free
February 26, 2020	(United States) Sam Raben	Colorado Rapids	(United States) Sporting Kansas City II	Free
February 27, 2020	(Spain) Miguel Berry	(United States) San Diego Toreros	Columbus Crew	Superdraft
February 27, 2020	(Italy) Giuseppe Rossi	(Italy) Genoa	Real Salt Lake	Free
February 27, 2020	(United States) Patrick Seagrist	(United States) Marquette Golden Eagles	New York Red Bulls	Superdraft
February 27, 2020	(United States) Jack Skahan	(United States) North Carolina Tar Heels	San Jose Earthquakes	Superdraft
February 27, 2020	(United States) Tanner Tessmann	(United States) North Texas SC	FC Dallas	Homegrown player
February 27, 2020	(United States) JJ Williams	Columbus Crew	(United States) Birmingham Legion	Free
February 28, 2020	(France) Romain Alessandrini	LA Galaxy	(China) Qingdao Huanghai	Free
February 28, 2020	(Portugal) Janio Bikel	(Bulgaria) CSKA Sofia	Vancouver Whitecaps FC	Transfer
February 28, 2020	(United States) Rey Ortiz	FC Cincinnati	(United States) Charlotte Independence	Loan
February 28, 2020	(United States) Dillon Serna	Colorado Rapids	(United States) Sporting Kansas City II	Free
February 29, 2020	(Estonia) Erik Sorga	(United States) Loudoun United	D.C. United	Free
February 29, 2020	(Ghana) Ema Twumasi	FC Dallas	(United States) Austin Bold	Loan
February 29, 2020	(England) Laurence Wyke	(United States) Atlanta United 2	Atlanta United FC	Short-term agreement
March 2, 2020	(Uruguay) Nicolás Acevedo	(Uruguay) Liverpool Montevideo	New York City FC	Transfer
March 2, 2020	(Argentina) Federico Higuaín	Columbus Crew	D.C. United	Free
March 3, 2020	(Ghana) Mohammed Abu	(Norway) Vålerenga	D.C. United	Loan
March 3, 2020	(United States) Kevin Garcia	Houston Dynamo	(United States) FC Tulsa	Free
March 3, 2020	(Kenya) Victor Wanyama	(England) Tottenham Hotspur	Montreal Impact	Free
March 4, 2020	(United States) Tim Howard	Colorado Rapids	(United States) Memphis 901	Free
March 4, 2020	(United States) Will Vint	(United States) Atlanta United 2	Colorado Rapids	Homegrown player
March 5, 2020	(United States) JJ Williams	(United States) Birmingham Legion	Atlanta United FC	Free
March 6, 2020	(Ghana) Francis Atuahene	FC Dallas	(United States) San Diego Loyal	Loan
March 6, 2020	(United States) Luke Haakenson	Nashville SC	(United States) Charlotte Independence	Loan
March 6, 2020	(United States) Jon Kempin	Columbus Crew	(United States) San Diego Loyal	Loan
March 6, 2020	(United States) Jack Maher	Nashville SC	(United States) Charlotte Independence	Loan
March 6, 2020	(Canada) James Pantemis	Montreal Impact	(Canada) Valour FC	Loan
March 6, 2020	(Canada) Jonathan Sirois	(Canada) Montreal Impact Academy	Montreal Impact	Homegrown player
March 6, 2020	(Sweden) Axel Sjöberg	Columbus Crew	(United States) San Antonio FC	Loan
March 6, 2020	(United States) Will Vint	Colorado Rapids	(United States) Colorado Springs Switchbacks	Loan
March 6, 2020	(United States) William Yarbrough	(Mexico) León	Colorado Rapids	Loan
March 7, 2020	(New Zealand) Kyle Adams	Houston Dynamo	(United States) Rio Grande Valley Toros	Loan
March 7, 2020	(Sweden) Erik McCue	Houston Dynamo	(United States) Rio Grande Valley Toros	Loan
March 7, 2020	(Venezuela) Ronaldo Peña	Houston Dynamo	(United States) Rio Grande Valley Toros	Loan
March 10, 2020	(United States) Will Bruin	Seattle Sounders FC	(United States) Tacoma Defiance	Loan
March 10, 2020	(Kenya) Handwalla Bwana	Seattle Sounders FC	(United States) Tacoma Defiance	Loan
March 10, 2020	(United States) Javier Casas	(United States) Chicago Fire Academy	Chicago Fire FC	Homegrown player
March 10, 2020	(United States) Danny Leyva	Seattle Sounders FC	(United States) Tacoma Defiance	Loan
March 10, 2020	(France) Jason Pendant	(France) Sochaux	New York Red Bulls	Transfer
March 11, 2020	(United States) Alex Monis	(United States) Chicago Fire Academy	Chicago Fire FC	Homegrown player
March 24, 2020	(United States) Chris Brady	(United States) Chicago Fire Academy	Chicago Fire FC	Homegrown player
March 25, 2020	(United States) Allan Rodríguez	(United States) Chicago Fire Academy	Chicago Fire FC	Homegrown player
May 7, 2020	(United States) Chris Durkin	D.C. United	(Belgium) Sint-Truiden	Transfer
June 11, 2020	(United States) Nico Lemoine	(United States) Rio Grande Valley FC	Houston Dynamo	Homegrown player
June 15, 2020	(United States) Josh Atencio	(United States) Tacoma Defiance	Seattle Sounders FC	Homegrown player
June 15, 2020	(United States) Ethan Dobbelaere	(United States) Tacoma Defiance	Seattle Sounders FC	Homegrown player
June 17, 2020	(Canada) Keesean Ferdinand	(Canada) Montreal Impact Academy	Montreal Impact	Homegrown player
June 17, 2020	(Canada) Tomas Giraldo	(Canada) Montreal Impact Academy	Montreal Impact	Homegrown player
June 17, 2020	(Honduras) Andy Najar	(Belgium) Anderlecht	Los Angeles FC	Transfer
June 18, 2020	(United States) Carlos Avilez	(United States) North Texas SC	FC Dallas	Homegrown player
June 18, 2020	(Venezuela) Pablo Bonilla	(United States) Portland Timbers 2	Portland Timbers	Free
June 23, 2020	(United States) Zac McGraw	(United States) Army Black Knights	Portland Timbers	Superdraft
June 25, 2020	(United States) Kai Koreniuk	(United States) LA Galaxy II	LA Galaxy	Free
June 25, 2020	(United States) Brek Shea	Atlanta United FC	Inter Miami CF	Free
June 26, 2020	(Panama) Carlos Harvey	(Panama) Tauro	LA Galaxy	Loan
June 30, 2020	(United States) Shandon Hopeau	(United States) Tacoma Defiance	Seattle Sounders FC	Homegrown player
June 30, 2020	(United States) Collen Warner	(Denmark) Helsingør	Colorado Rapids	Free
July 1, 2020	(Mexico) Jürgen Damm	(Mexico) Tigres	Atlanta United FC	Free
July 1, 2020	(Ecuador) Romario Ibarra	Minnesota United FC	(Mexico) Pachuca	Transfer
July 2, 2020	(United States) Tyler Wolff	(United States) Atlanta United Academy	Atlanta United FC	Homegrown player
July 6, 2020	(United States) Kevin Silva	(Canada) Toronto FC II	Toronto FC	Free
July 7, 2020	(Argentina) Franco Jara	(Mexico) Pachuca	FC Dallas	Free
July 8, 2020	(Jamaica) Rashawn Dally	FC Cincinnati	(United States) Las Vegas Lights	Loan
July 8, 2020	(United States) Erik Dueñas	(United States) Los Angeles FC Academy	Los Angeles FC	Homegrown player
July 8, 2020	(United States) Tony Leone	(United States) Los Angeles FC Academy	Los Angeles FC	Homegrown player
July 8, 2020	(United States) Matt Polster	(Scotland) Rangers	New England Revolution	Transfer
July 8, 2020	(United States) Christian Torres	(United States) Los Angeles FC Academy	Los Angeles FC	Homegrown player
July 10, 2020	(Serbia) Aleksandar Katai	LA Galaxy	(Serbia) Red Star Belgrade	Free
July 11, 2020	(Hungary) Botond Baráth	Sporting Kansas City	(Hungary) Budapest Honvéd	Transfer
July 13, 2020	(United States) Rece Buckmaster	New York Red Bulls	(United States) Memphis 901	Free
July 15, 2020	(United States) Michael Halliday	(United States) Orlando City B	Orlando City SC	Homegrown player
July 20, 2020	(Uganda) Mustafa Kizza	(Uganda) KCCA FC	Montreal Impact	Transfer
July 20, 2020	(Uganda) Mustafa Kizza	Montreal Impact	(Uganda) KCCA FC	Loan
July 22, 2020	(Scotland) Sam Nicholson	Colorado Rapids	(England) Bristol Rovers	Free
July 22, 2020	(Canada) Jonathan Sirois	Montreal Impact	Vancouver Whitecaps FC	One-day loan
July 31, 2020	(Mexico) Erick Torres	(Mexico) Club Tijuana	Atlanta United FC	Free
August 3, 2020	(Mali) Bakaye Dibassy	(France) Amiens	Minnesota United FC	Transfer
August 5, 2020	(England) Dru Yearwood	(England) Brentford	New York Red Bulls	Transfer
August 7, 2020	(United States) Tanner Dieterich	Nashville SC	(United States) Chattanooga Red Wolves	Loan
August 11, 2020	(Ghana) Samuel Tetteh	(Austria) Red Bull Salzburg	New York Red Bulls	Loan
August 13, 2020	(England) Luis Binks	Montreal Impact	(Italy) Bologna	Transfer
August 13, 2020	(England) Luis Binks	(Italy) Bologna	Montreal Impact	Loan
August 13, 2020	(France) Blaise Matuidi	(Italy) Juventus	Inter Miami CF	Free
August 13, 2020	(United States) Efrain Morales	(United States) Atlanta United Academy	Atlanta United FC	Homegrown player
August 13, 2020	(United States) Alex Muyl	New York Red Bulls	Nashville SC	Trade
August 14, 2020	(Ghana) Emmanuel Boateng	D.C. United	Columbus Crew	Trade
August 14, 2020	(South Korea) Hwang In-beom	Vancouver Whitecaps FC	(Russia) Rubin Kazan	Transfer
August 14, 2020	(United States) Grant Lillard	Inter Miami CF	Columbus Crew	Trade
August 14, 2020	(Colombia) Andrés Ricaurte	(Colombia) Independiente Medellín	FC Dallas	Loan
August 14, 2020	(Canada) Rocco Romeo	Toronto FC	(Denmark) HB Køge	Loan
August 14, 2020	(Sweden) Axel Sjöberg	Columbus Crew	D.C. United	Trade
August 17, 2020	(United States) Fatai Alashe	FC Cincinnati	Columbus Crew	Trade
August 17, 2020	(Canada) Isaac Boehmer	(Canada) Vancouver Whitecaps Academy	Vancouver Whitecaps FC	Homegrown player
August 17, 2020	(Costa Rica) Ariel Lassiter	(Costa Rica) Alajuelense	Houston Dynamo	Loan
August 17, 2020	(The Gambia) Kekuta Manneh	FC Cincinnati	New England Revolution	Trade
August 17, 2020	(United States) Jack McGlynn	(United States) Philadelphia Union II	Philadelphia Union	Homegrown player
August 17, 2020	(United States) Tommy McNamara	Houston Dynamo	New England Revolution	Trade
August 17, 2020	(United States) Brady Scott	(Germany) FC Köln	Nashville SC	Free
August 17, 2020	(Senegal) Mohamed Traore	(United States) SIMA Águilas	Los Angeles FC	Transfer
August 17, 2020	(Central African Republic) Wilfried Zahibo	New England Revolution	Houston Dynamo	Trade
August 18, 2020	(Brazil) Phelipe Megiolaro	(Brazil) Grêmio	FC Dallas	Loan
August 19, 2020	(Colombia) Yony González	(Portugal) Benfica	LA Galaxy	Loan
August 20, 2020	(United States) Jonathan Klinsmann	(Switzerland) St. Gallen	LA Galaxy	Free
August 20, 2020	(South Africa) Kamohelo Mokotjo	(England) Brentford	FC Cincinnati	Free
August 20, 2020	(Canada) Jordan Perruzza	(Canada) Toronto FC II	Toronto FC	Homegrown player
August 21, 2020	(Brazil) Matheus Aiás	(England) Watford	Orlando City SC	Transfer
August 21, 2020	(Sweden) Magnus Eriksson	San Jose Earthquakes	(Sweden) Djurgården	Transfer
August 21, 2020	(Colombia) Santiago Patiño	Orlando City SC	(Mexico) Cimarrones de Sonora	Loan
August 21, 2020	(Colombia) Carlos Terán	(Colombia) Envigado	Chicago Fire FC	Transfer
August 24, 2020	(Paraguay) Cecilio Domínguez	(Argentina) Independiente	Austin FC	Transfer
August 24, 2020	(United States) Brady Scott	Nashville SC	(United States) Sacramento Republic	Loan
August 31, 2020	(Venezuela) Gelmin Rivas	(Turkey) Ankaragücü	D.C. United	Free
September 1, 2020	(Paraguay) Cecilio Domínguez	Austin FC	(Paraguay) Guaraní	Loan
September 1, 2020	(Argentina) Emanuel Reynoso	(Argentina) Boca Juniors	Minnesota United FC	Transfer
September 2, 2020	(Argentina) Álvaro Barreal	(Argentina) Vélez Sarsfield	FC Cincinnati	Transfer
September 3, 2020	(Spain) Sergio Ruiz	(Spain) Racing Santander	Charlotte FC	Transfer
September 3, 2020	(Spain) Sergio Ruiz	Charlotte FC	(Spain) Las Palmas	Loan
September 5, 2020	(Venezuela) Christian Makoun	Inter Miami CF	(United States) Fort Lauderdale CF	Loan
September 7, 2020	(Argentina) Pity Martínez	Atlanta United FC	(Saudi Arabia) Al-Nassr	Transfer
September 8, 2020	(United States) Lee Nguyen	Inter Miami CF	New England Revolution	Trade
September 9, 2020	(Venezuela) Jhonder Cádiz	(Portugal) Benfica	Nashville SC	Loan
September 9, 2020	(United States) Reggie Cannon	FC Dallas	(Portugal) Boavista	Transfer
September 13, 2020	(Czech Republic) Zdeněk Ondrášek	FC Dallas	(Czech Republic) Viktoria Plzeň	Transfer
September 14, 2020	(Scotland) Tony Gallacher	(England) Liverpool	Toronto FC	Loan
September 17, 2020	(United States) Adrian Zendejas	Nashville SC	Minnesota United FC	Trade
September 18, 2020	(Argentina) Gonzalo Higuaín	(Italy) Juventus	Inter Miami CF	Free
September 19, 2020	(Sierra Leone) Kei Kamara	Colorado Rapids	Minnesota United FC	Trade
September 19, 2020	(Peru) Yordy Reyna	Vancouver Whitecaps FC	D.C. United	Trade
September 20, 2020	(Iran) Steven Beitashour	Los Angeles FC	Colorado Rapids	Free
September 21, 2020	(Honduras) Alberth Elis	Houston Dynamo	(Portugal) Boavista	Transfer
September 22, 2020	(United States) Bode Davis	(United States) Real Monarchs	Real Salt Lake	Homegrown player
September 22, 2020	(Argentina) Marcelino Moreno	(Argentina) Lanús	Atlanta United FC	Transfer
September 25, 2020	(United States) Andrew Brody	(United States) Real Monarchs	Real Salt Lake	Homegrown player
September 25, 2020	(Canada) Noble Okello	Toronto FC	(Denmark) HB Køge	Loan
September 25, 2020	(Morocco) Adrien Regattin	FC Cincinnati	(Turkey) Altay	Free
September 28, 2020	(United States) Evan Bush	Montreal Impact	Vancouver Whitecaps FC	Trade
September 28, 2020	(Panama) Román Torres	Inter Miami CF	Seattle Sounders FC	Trade
October 1, 2020	(United States) Mason Toye	Minnesota United FC	Montreal Impact	Trade
October 2, 2020	(United States) Justin Che	(United States) North Texas SC	FC Dallas	Homegrown player
October 5, 2020	(Argentina) Mateo Bajamich	(Argentina) Instituto	Houston Dynamo	Transfer
October 5, 2020	(Australia) Riley McGree	(Australia) Adelaide United	Charlotte FC	Transfer
October 5, 2020	(Australia) Riley McGree	Charlotte FC	(England) Birmingham City	Loan
October 5, 2020	(Hungary) Krisztián Németh	(Slovakia) DAC Dunajská Streda	Columbus Crew	Free
October 6, 2020	(Ghana) Kwadwo Opoku	(Ghana) Attram De Visser Soccer Academy	Los Angeles FC	Transfer
October 7, 2020	(Canada) Simon Colyn	Vancouver Whitecaps FC	(Italy) SPAL	Loan
October 8, 2020	(Romania) Alexandru Mitriță	New York City FC	(Saudi Arabia) Al Ahli	Loan
October 10, 2020	(United States) Caden Clark	(United States) New York Red Bulls II	New York Red Bulls	Free
October 10, 2020	(Argentina) Federico Higuaín	D.C. United	Inter Miami CF	Trade
October 12, 2020	(Croatia) Franko Kovačević	(Germany) 1899 Hoffenheim	FC Cincinnati	Loan
October 13, 2020	(Ecuador) Alexander Alvarado	(Ecuador) Aucas	Orlando City SC	Loan
October 13, 2020	(United States) Mark Segbers	(United States) Memphis 901	Los Angeles FC	Loan
October 14, 2020	(Colombia) Jesús David Murillo	(Colombia) Independiente Medellín	Los Angeles FC	Loan
October 14, 2020	(United States) Beckham Sunderland	(United States) FC Cincinnati Academy	FC Cincinnati	Homegrown player
October 14, 2020	(Algeria) Saphir Taïder	Montreal Impact	(Saudi Arabia) Al-Ain	Transfer
October 21, 2020	(Somalia) Handwalla Bwana	Seattle Sounders FC	Nashville SC	Trade
October 21, 2020	(United States) Wilson Harris	(United States) Sporting Kansas City II	Sporting Kansas City	Homegrown player
October 21, 2020	(Colombia) Jimmy Medranda	Nashville SC	Seattle Sounders FC	Trade
