= Fernando González (footballer, born 1997) =

Mexican footballer

Personal information
- Full name: Fernando González Delfín
- Date of birth: 9 September 1997 (age 29)
- Place of birth: Xalapa, Veracruz, Mexico
- Height: 1.66 m (5 ft 5 in)
- Position: Midfielder

Youth career
- 2014–2019: América

Senior career*
Years	Team	Apps	(Gls)
2018	América Premier	15	(2)
2019	América	2	(0)
2019	Colorado Springs Switchbacks	6	(0)
2020–2022	Celaya	46	(0)
- * Club domestic league appearances and goals as of 8 May 2022

Fernando González Delfín (born 9 September 1997) is a Mexican professional footballer who plays as a midfielder.

== Career ==
González played for América at youth level for many years, appearing for their Under-20's and for América Premier during their 2018 season.

González appeared for América in Liga MX in 2019, making two appearances.

On 13 August 2019, González moved to the United States, signing for USL Championship side Colorado Springs Switchbacks.
