= Aidan Daniels =

Canadian soccer player (born 1998)

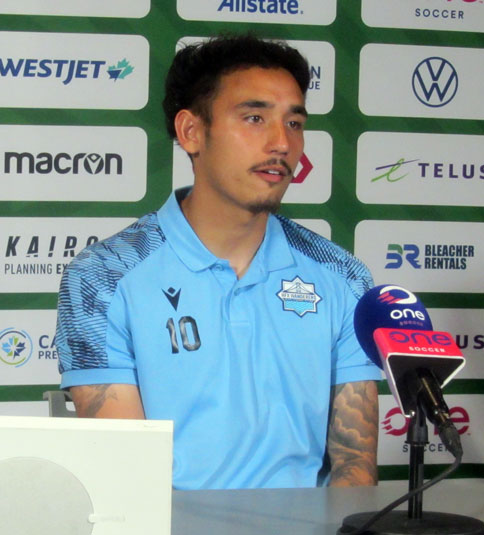
- Daniels in 2023

Personal information
- Full name: Aidan Jun Valcarcel Daniels
- Date of birth: September 6, 1998 (age 28)
- Place of birth: Markham, Ontario, Canada
- Height: 1.79 m (5 ft 10 in)
- Position: Midfielder

Team information
- Current team: Pacific FC
- Number: 8

Youth career
- Ajax FC
- Richmond Hill SC
- 2012–2016: Toronto FC

Senior career*
Years	Team	Apps	(Gls)
2016–2017	Toronto FC III	5	(0)
2016–2017	Toronto FC II	39	(1)
2018–2019	Toronto FC	1	(0)
2018	→ Toronto FC II (loan)	26	(2)
2019	→ Ottawa Fury (loan)	14	(1)
2020	Colorado Springs Switchbacks	16	(3)
2021	OKC Energy FC	30	(3)
2022–2024	HFX Wanderers	75	(5)
2025–	Pacific FC	47	(1)

International career^{‡}
2015	Canada U17	4	(0)
2017	Canada U20	3	(0)
2018	Canada U21	4	(0)
2021	Canada U23	4	(0)
- * Club domestic league appearances and goals as of October 27, 2026 ‡ National team caps and goals as of March 28, 2021

Aidan Jun Valcarcel Daniels (born September 6, 1998) is a Canadian professional soccer player who plays for Canadian Premier League club Pacific FC.

== Club career ==
=== Toronto FC ===
In July 2016, at the age of 17, Daniels signed a professional contract with Toronto FC II. A product of the Toronto FC Academy, he was rewarded with a loan to affiliate club Toronto FC II ahead of the 2016 USL season. Having already been capped internationally while playing for the academy, Daniels made his professional debut in the season opener on March 26, 2016. He played for 78 minutes in a 2–2 draw with New York Red Bulls II, before being replaced by Malik Johnson. During the 2017 offseason, Daniels would train with Danish club HB Køge.

On April 13, 2018, Daniels signed as a homegrown player with Major League Soccer side Toronto FC. On 21 April 2018, Daniels made his MLS debut with Toronto FC against Houston Dynamo.

==== Loan to Ottawa Fury FC ====
On March 6, 2019, it was announced that Daniels would be loaned to USL Championship club Ottawa Fury FC for the 2019 season.

=== Colorado Springs Switchbacks ===
Daniels would sign with USL Championship club Colorado Springs Switchbacks FC for the 2020 season. On July 11, he scored his first goal against New Mexico United. He later re-signed with the club for the 2021 season.

=== OKC Energy ===
On January 26, 2021, Daniels joined USL Championship side OKC Energy. In December 2021, Oklahoma City Energy would announce that they would go on hiatus for the 2022 season, ending Daniels' time with the club after one season.

=== HFX Wanderers ===
In January 2022, Canadian Premier League side HFX Wanderers announced they had signed Daniels to a two-year deal. He made his debut for the Wanderers on April 7 against York United. Daniels scored his first goal for his new club on May 10 in the Canadian Championship, netting the second against Guelph United in a 2–0 victory. In January 2022 the Wanderers announced Daniels had signed a new contract through 2023, with added options for 2024 and 2025.

=== Pacific FC ===
In January 2025, he signed with Pacific FC on a two-year contract with an option for 2027.

== International career ==
Daniels qualifies to represent Canada, South Africa or the Philippines at senior level as his father hails from Johannesburg and his mother from Manila. After call-ups to the Canada Under-15 camps in USA and Laval in 2013, Daniels finally made his international debut in 2015. He made two appearances at the Under-17 CONCACAF Championship, the first coming in a 3–1 victory over Saint Lucia on March 9, 2015. His next appearance came just three days later in a 1–0 defeat to Panama. In February 2017, Daniels was named to Canada's roster for the 2017 CONCACAF U-20 Championship In May 2018, Daniels was named to Canada's under-21 squad for the 2018 Toulon Tournament. Daniels was named to the Canadian U-23 provisional roster for the 2020 CONCACAF Men's Olympic Qualifying Championship on February 26, 2020. He was named to the final squad for Olympic qualification on March 10, 2021.

== Personal ==
Daniels' father was born in Johannesburg, South Africa and his mother was born in Manila, Philippines. His grandfather was a professional soccer player in South Africa and also played for Portuguese club Sporting CP. His uncles also played professionally, while an Achilles injury prevented his father from signing a professional contract.

== Career statistics ==
As of October 24, 2025

Club	League	Season	League		Playoffs		Domestic Cup		Total	
Club	League	Season	Apps	Goals	Apps	Goals	Apps	Goals	Apps	Goals
Toronto FC III	PDL	2016	1	0	—		—		1	0
Toronto FC III	League1 Ontario	2017	4	0	0	0	—		4	0
Toronto FC II	USL	2016	23	1	—		—		23	1
Toronto FC II	USL	2017	16	0	—		—		16	0
Toronto FC II	USL	2018	26	2	—		—		26	2
Toronto FC II	Total		65	3	0	0	0	0	65	3
Toronto FC	MLS	2018	1	0	—		0	0	1	0
Ottawa Fury (loan)	USL Championship	2019	14	1	0	0	0	0	14	1
Colorado Springs Switchbacks	USL Championship	2020	16	3	—		—		16	3
OKC Energy	USL Championship	2021	30	3	—		—		30	3
HFX Wanderers	Canadian Premier League	2022	21	1	—		2	1	23	2
HFX Wanderers	Canadian Premier League	2023	28	3	1	0	1	0	30	4
HFX Wanderers	Canadian Premier League	2024	26	0	—		1	0	27	0
HFX Wanderers	Total		75	4	1	0	4	1	80	5
Pacific FC	Canadian Premier League	2025	24	1	—		1	0	25	1
Career Total			230	15	1	0	5	1	236	16
