= Kwasi Donsu =

Ghanaian professional footballer

Personal information
- Full name: Kwasi Donsu
- Date of birth: 2 December 1995 (age 30)
- Place of birth: Tamale, Ghana
- Height: 5 ft 8 in (1.73 m)
- Position: Midfielder

Team information
- Current team: Sirens (loan)
- Number: 29

Senior career*
| Years | Team | Apps | (Gls) |
| 2013– | Medeama | 111 | (27) |
| 2019 | → Colorado Springs Switchbacks (loan) | 15 | (0) |
| 2023– | → Sirens (loan) | 26 | (2) |
- * Club domestic league appearances and goals as of 13 May 2024

Kwasi Donsu (born 2 December 1995), is a Ghanaian professional footballer who plays for Maltese side Sirens, on loan from Ghana Premier League club Medeama.

== Career ==
Donsu led the Ghana Premier League in scoring during its abbreviated 2018 season with 8 goals and compiled 22 goals in 39 appearances between 2017 and 2018. With the 2019 season in Ghana unclear Donsu and teammate Ibrahim Yaro were loaned to USL Championship team Colorado Springs Switchbacks with an option to buy. The option for both players was declined and they returned to Ghana after the 2019 USL Championship season ended.
