= Ibrahim Yaro =

Ghanaian footballer

Nasallah A Musa
Personal information
- Full name: Ibrahim Yaro
- Date of birth: 21 June 1996 (age 30)
- Place of birth: Ghana
- Position: Central defender

Youth career
- Medeama

Senior career*
Years	Team	Apps	(Gls)
2016–	Medeama	56	(1)
2019	→ Colorado Springs Switchbacks (loan)	18	(0)
- * Club domestic league appearances and goals as of 2 March 2021 ‡ National team caps and goals as of 31 January 2019

Ibrahim Yaro (born 21 June 1996), is a Ghanaian professional footballer who plays for Medeama in the Ghana Premier League.

== Professional career ==
With the 2019 season in Ghana unclear Yaro and teammate Kwasi Donsu were loaned to USL Championship team Colorado Springs Switchbacks with an option to buy. The option for both players was declined and they returned to Ghana after the 2019 USL Championship season ended.

== International career ==
Yaro last appeared international for Ghana in December 2018 when he was called up by the Ghanaian U23 National Team for the U23 African Cup of Nations qualifier match against Togo.

== Personal life ==
Yaro and his longtime girlfriend, Feli, were married in April 2018.
