= Kris Reaves =

American soccer player (born 1995)

Personal information
- Full name: Kris Reaves
- Date of birth: November 10, 1995 (age 30)
- Place of birth: Atlanta, Georgia, United States
- Height: 6 ft 2 in (1.88 m)
- Position: Defender

Youth career
- 2012–2014: FC Dallas

College career
| Years | Team | Apps | (Gls) |
| 2014–2015 | Wake Forest Demon Deacons | 41 | (1) |
| 2016–2017 | Portland Pilots | 35 | (0) |

Senior career*
| Years | Team | Apps | (Gls) |
| 2018 | FC Dallas | 2 | (0) |
| 2019–2020 | Colorado Springs Switchbacks | 36 | (0) |
- * Club domestic league appearances and goals as of October 5, 2020

Kris Reaves (born November 10, 1995) is an American retired professional soccer player.

== Career ==
=== Youth and college ===
Reaves played two years of college soccer at the University of Portland between 2016 and 2017.

=== Professional ===
On January 10, 2018, Reaves was signed as a homegrown player by FC Dallas.

He was the 20th overall homegrown player signed by FC Dallas. He made his debut on June 29, 2018, starting and playing 78 minutes in a 1–0 victory over Minnesota United.

Reaves was released by Dallas at the end of their 2018 season.

Reaves signed with USL Championship side Colorado Springs Switchbacks FC for the 2019 season.

Reaves retired from professional soccer following the 2020 season and returned to the University of Portland to pursue an MBA.
