= Martin Maybin =

Northern Irish footballer

Personal information
- Date of birth: 10 January 1992 (age 34)
- Place of birth: Larne, Northern Ireland
- Position: Forward

Youth career
- –2010: Larne Colts
- 2008–2010: Glentoran

College career
Years	Team	Apps	(Gls)
2010–2014	Regis Rangers	73	(53)

Senior career*
Years	Team	Apps	(Gls)
2015–2016	Colorado Springs Switchbacks	52	(10)
2017	Carrick Rangers	14	(0)
2018	Colorado Springs Switchbacks	24	(4)
2019	Hamilton Wanderers	6	(0)
- * Club domestic league appearances and goals as of 01:32, 23 December 2020 (UTC)

Martin "Marty" Maybin (born 10 January 1992) is a Northern Irish footballer who plays as a forward.

== Career ==
=== Youth and college ===
While at St MacNissi's College, Maybin played for local club team Larne Colts until 2010. In 2006, he was the U15 side's top goal scorer. In November 2007, while still with the U16 side, Maybin recorded his 300th goal for the club in all competitions. He was again the team's top goal scorer for the 2008 season. He also played for the academy of Glentoran of the NIFL Premiership and was close to being offered a first-team contract. However, he opted to leave the club and play college soccer in the United States.

Maybin played four years of college soccer at Regis University between 2010 and 2014, including a red-shirted year in 2010. During his time at Regis, Maybin was named South Central Region Player of the Year and RMAC Player of the Year and scored 53 goals in 73 total matches.

=== Professional ===
Maybin signed with USL club Colorado Springs Switchbacks on 5 February 2015. Maybin ended his first season with the Switchbacks with 3 goals and 1 assist in 21 games.

On 14 January 2016 Maybin resigned with the Colorado Springs Switchbacks for the 2016 USL Pro Season. Maybin scored in a 3-1 victory against Colorado State-Pueblo University. On 8 March Maybin scored a goal in a 2-0 for the Colorado Springs Switchbacks over the Colorado School of Mines. Maybin scored the first goal in the Switchbacks 2-1 opening day victory of the 2016 USL Pro season, away at OKC Energy. Maybin scored his second goal of the 2016 USL Pro season in the Colorado Springs Switchbacks FC's home opener.

In June 2017 Maybin returned to Northern Ireland and signed for Carrick Rangers F.C. of the NIFL Premiership ahead of the 2017–18 season.

On 21 December 2017 Switchbacks FC announced they would bring Maybin back for the 2018 season.
