= Abraham Rodriguez (soccer) =

American soccer player

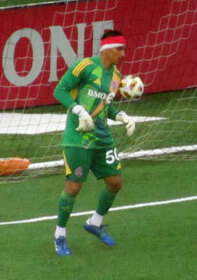
- Rodriguez in 2024

Personal information
- Date of birth: July 19, 2002 (age 24)
- Place of birth: El Paso, Texas, United States
- Height: 5 ft 8 in (1.73 m)
- Position: Goalkeeper

Youth career
- 2016–2020: Colorado Rapids

Senior career*
Years	Team	Apps	(Gls)
2019	Colorado Springs Switchbacks	16	(0)
2020–2023	Colorado Rapids	2	(0)
2020–2021	→ Colorado Springs Switchbacks (loan)	11	(0)
2022–2023	→ Colorado Rapids 2 (loan)	25	(0)
2024	Toronto FC II	6	(0)
- * Club domestic league appearances and goals as of November 15, 2024

Abraham Rodriguez (born July 19, 2002) is an American professional soccer player who plays as a goalkeeper.

== Early life ==
In 2016, Rodriguez joined the Colorado Rapids academy at U14 level. Born in the United States, he is of Mexican descent and holds dual-citizenship.

== Club career ==
Rodriguez began the 2019 season on a USL Academy contract with the Colorado Springs Switchbacks, who were the Colorado Rapids' USL Championship affiliate. Rodriguez made his professional debut on March 30, 2019, at 16 years old in a 2–2 draw against Phoenix Rising FC. His performance earned him the league Player of the Week honors, becoming the second-youngest player ever to do so, and also earned Save of the Week honors for his penalty kick save in the match. Later in April, he was nominated for the league's Save of the Week honor. In August 2019, he signed a professional USL contract with the Switchbacks. At the end of the season, he was named #20 on the USL's 20 Under 20 list.

After attending 2020 preseason with the Colorado Rapids first team, on February 20, 2020, at age sixteen, Rodriguez signed a homegrown player contract with the club. He was then subsequently loaned to the Colorado Springs Switchbacks the next day. In March 2021, he was again loaned to the Switchbacks. On June 25, 2022, he made his debut for the Rapids, coming on as a substitute for the injured William Yarbrough, in a match against the Portland Timbers, becoming the youngest goalkeeper to play in franchise history at 19 years, 341 days. On October 21, 2023, he made his first Major League Soccer start in a match against Real Salt Lake. During the 2022 and 2023 seasons, he also spent time with the second team, Colorado Rapids 2, in MLS Next Pro making a combined 27 appearances.

In March 2024, he signed with Toronto FC II in MLS Next Pro. He made his debut for the club on March 17 in a match against Philadelphia Union II. In November 2024, it as announced that Rodriguez's contract option would not be picked up.

== Career statistics ==
As of match played September 22, 2024

Appearances and goals by club, season and competition
Club	Season	League			Playoffs		National cup		Continental		Other		Total	
Club	Season	Division	Apps	Goals	Apps	Goals	Apps	Goals	Apps	Goals	Apps	Goals	Apps	Goals
Colorado Springs; Switchbacks	2019	USL Championship	16	0	—		2	0	—		—		18	0
Colorado Rapids	2020	Major League Soccer	0	0	0	0	—		—		—		0	0
Colorado Rapids	2021	Major League Soccer	0	0	0	0	—		—		—		0	0
Colorado Rapids	2022	Major League Soccer	1	0	—		0	0	0	0	—		1	0
Colorado Rapids	2023	Major League Soccer	1	0	—		0	0	—		0	0	1	0
Colorado Rapids	Total		2	0	0	0	0	0	0	0	0	0	2	0
Colorado Springs; Switchbacks (loan)	2020	USL Championship	5	0	—		—		—		—		5	0
Colorado Springs; Switchbacks (loan)	2021	USL Championship	6	0	0	0	—		—		—		6	0
Colorado Springs; Switchbacks (loan)	Total		11	0	0	0	0	0	0	0	0	0	11	0
Colorado Rapids 2 (loan)	2022	MLS Next Pro	17	0	—		—		—		—		17	0
Colorado Rapids 2 (loan)	2023	MLS Next Pro	8	0	2	0	—		—		—		10	0
Colorado Rapids 2 (loan)	Total		25	0	2	0	0	0	0	0	0	0	27	0
Toronto FC II	2024	MLS Next Pro	6	0	—		—		—		—		6	0
Career total			60	0	2	0	0	0	0	0	0	0	62	0
