= Jordan Schweitzer =

Canadian soccer player (born 1994)

Personal information
- Full name: Jordan Schweitzer
- Date of birth: April 19, 1994 (age 32)
- Place of birth: Dallas, Texas, United States
- Height: 1.80 m (5 ft 11 in)
- Position: Midfielder

Youth career
- 2010–2012: Seattle Sounders FC

College career
Years	Team	Apps	(Gls)
2012–2015	Denver Pioneers	73	(2)

Senior career*
Years	Team	Apps	(Gls)
2013–2015	Seattle Sounders FC U-23	24	(0)
2016	Seattle Sounders FC	0	(0)
2016	Seattle Sounders FC 2	22	(4)
2017	Orlando City B	24	(1)
2018–2019	Colorado Springs Switchbacks	67	(1)
2020	Phoenix Rising	14	(1)

International career^{‡}
2017	Canada U23	4	(0)

Managerial career
- 2017: UCF Knights (scout/video analyst)
- 2018: UCCS Mountain Lions (assistant)
- * Club domestic league appearances and goals as of April 1, 2021 ‡ National team caps and goals as of March 29, 2017

Jordan Schweitzer (born April 19, 1994) is a Canadian soccer player.

== Club career ==
Schweitzer was raised in Everett, Washington, and played for Henry M. Jackson High School in Mill Creek, where he captained the team as a journal and was named a First Team All-WESCO selection. He was a member of the Seattle Sounders FC Academy from 2011 to 2012, recording six goals in 25 appearances for the U-18s in the 2011–2012 season, as well as six scoring tallies in 29 games for the U-16s in 2010–2011.

Schweitzer was a three-time All-Summit League First Team selection at the University of Denver, starting 70 of his 73 appearances across four collegiate seasons from 2012 to 2015. He led the Pioneers to three consecutive NCAA Tournament appearances.

As a senior in 2015, the defensive midfielder was named a First Team All-West Region selection after co-captaining the Pioneers to their second-straight Summit League Championship and a 15–1–3 record. Unbeaten in 18 matches prior to the NCAA Tournament, Schweitzer sat in front of a backline that recorded a 0.40 goals against average and 12 clean-sheets in 2015. Schweitzer recorded two goals and three assists and missed just six matches in his collegiate career, with Denver accumulating a 50–18–11 record during his four-year span.

=== Seattle Sounders FC ===
Schweitzer was signed to a Homegrown Player contract on January 7, 2016, by Seattle Sounders FC of Major League Soccer. On March 1, he was waived and immediately added to the Seattle Sounders FC 2 roster. Sounders FC 2 had indicated that Schweitzer would make his full professional debut in the season-opening match against Sacramento Republic FC on March 25, 2016, before he suffered an injury. He made his professional debut on April 17 in a 1–0 victory over Colorado Springs Switchbacks.

=== Orlando City B ===
Schweitzer signed with USL side Orlando City B on December 6, 2016. At the conclusion of the 2017 season, Orlando City B announced they would not pick up Schweitzer's option for the following season.

=== Colorado Springs Switchbacks FC ===
On January 12, 2018, it was announced that Schweitzer had signed for USL side Colorado Springs Switchbacks FC.

=== Phoenix Rising FC ===
Schweitzer signed with Phoenix Rising FC on December 24, 2019.

== International ==
Eligible for both the United States and Canada, Schweitzer was called up by the Canadian U23 team for the Aspire U-23 tournament in Qatar on March 18, 2017. He received his first call up to the senior team for a friendly against El Salvador on September 29, 2017.

== Personal life ==
The son of Darwin and Kari Schweitzer and Connie Schweitzer, he has two sisters, Taylor and Rachael. From 2010 to 2012, Schweitzer coached Sounders FC summer camps, and was also a part of a project to send soccer gear to Thailand. He enjoys snowboarding and traveling.
