= Matt Hundley =

American soccer player

Personal information
- Full name: Matthew David Hundley
- Date of birth: May 11, 2000 (age 26)
- Place of birth: Littleton, Colorado, United States
- Height: 5 ft 10 in (1.78 m)
- Position: Forward

Youth career
- 2015–2016: Real Colorado
- 2016–2018: Colorado Rapids

College career
Years	Team	Apps	(Gls)
2018	UCLA Bruins	19	(5)

Senior career*
Years	Team	Apps	(Gls)
2018	Colorado Rapids U-23	2	(2)
2019–2022	Colorado Rapids	0	(0)
2019	→ Colorado Springs Switchbacks (loan)	29	(1)
2020	→ Memphis 901 (loan)	10	(2)
2021	→ Colorado Springs Switchbacks (loan)	3	(0)

International career^{‡}
2016–2017	United States U17	5	(6)
2018–	United States U19	1	(1)
- * Club domestic league appearances and goals as of November 7, 2021 ‡ National team caps and goals as of March 13, 2019

Matthew David Hundley (born May 11, 2000) is an American soccer player who plays as a forward. Before turning pro, he appeared in the Premier Development League for Colorado Rapids U-23.

== Youth ==
Hundley played youth soccer for the Colorado Rapids Academy at the U-18/19 level before attending UCLA. Hundley played one year for the Bruins in 2018, appearing in all 19 matches, starting 14. Hundley finished with five goals and seven assists before being selected to the All-Pac-12 Second Team.

== Professional ==
Hundley became the ninth Rapids Academy product to sign a Homegrown contract with Colorado on Jan. 15, 2019. Hundley was loaned to Colorado Springs Switchbacks FC in the USL Championship on March 6. Hundley made 29 USL appearances for Switchbacks FC, 19 of them starts. Hundley scored his first professional goal in a 2–0 win over LA Galaxy II on Oct. 5.

On Feb. 21, 2020, Hundley was loaned to Memphis 901 FC in the USL Championship. Hundley made two starts in 10 appearances for Memphis and scored two goals as a substitute in a 3–2 win over North Carolina FC on Sept. 10. Hundley was on the Rapids' bench for MLS matches against Sporting Kansas City on Oct. 24 and Minnesota United FC on Oct. 28.

In March 2021, Hundley returned to Colorado Springs on loan for the 2021 season.

On March 1, 2022, Hundley was waived by Colorado Rapids without having made a first team appearance.
