= Alex Molano =

American professional soccer player (born 1992)

Personal information
- Full name: Alexander William Molano
- Date of birth: April 10, 1992 (age 34)
- Place of birth: Grapevine, Texas, United States
- Height: 1.78 m (5 ft 10 in)
- Position: Midfielder

Youth career
- FC Dallas
- 2009: IMG Academy
- 2009–2011: Dinamo Zagreb

Senior career*
Years	Team	Apps	(Gls)
2011	Bodens BK	5	(0)
2012–2013	NK Vrapče		
2013	Bodens BK	8	(0)
2014–2015	Dallas Sidekicks (indoor)	6	(2)
2014–2015	Dallas City FC		
2016	Swope Park Rangers	17	(1)
2017	North Carolina FC	5	(0)
2018	Dallas Elite FC		
2019	Colorado Springs Switchbacks	13	(0)
2019–2020	Dallas Sidekicks (indoor)	7	(0)
2020	Los Angeles Force	1	(0)
2021	Denton Diablos		

International career
2009	United States U17	4	(0)
2010	United States U20	5	(3)
- * Club domestic league appearances and goals as of 2 July 2020

Alexander William Molano (born April 10, 1992) is an American professional soccer player.

== Career ==
Molano signed with Dinamo Zagreb in 2009, spending two seasons with their academy before moving to Sweden with Boden. He made five appearances for Boden before returning to Croatia a year later to join NK Vrapče, and again returning to Sweden with Boden in 2013, where he tallied two assists in eight appearances.

Molano came back to the United States in 2014, playing with fifth-tier National Premier Soccer League side Dallas City FC in both 2014 and 2015.

Molano returned to professional soccer in January 2016, signing with United Soccer League side Swope Park Rangers. He scored his first goal with a 95th-minute equalizing free kick against Colorado Springs Switchbacks FC on July 20, 2016.

Molano signed with the Major Arena Soccer League's Dallas Sidekicks on September 18, 2019. His father Willie Molano had played for the original Dallas Sidekicks from 1987 to 1990.
