= Mike Seth =

American soccer player (born 1987)

Personal information
- Full name: Michael Seth
- Date of birth: September 20, 1987 (age 39)
- Place of birth: Pittsburgh, Pennsylvania, United States
- Height: 6 ft 1 in (1.85 m)
- Positions: Forward; attacking midfielder

College career
Years	Team	Apps	(Gls)
2005–2009	Behrend Lions		

Senior career*
Years	Team	Apps	(Gls)
2008	Colorado Rapids U23's	1	(0)
2010–2014	Pittsburgh Riverhounds	64	(5)
2015–2016	Colorado Springs Switchbacks	56	(12)
2017	Phoenix Rising	4	(0)
2017–2018	San Antonio FC	19	(0)
2019	Colorado Springs Switchbacks	20	(2)
- * Club domestic league appearances and goals as of October 25, 2019

Mike Seth (born September 20, 1987) is an American soccer player who most recently played for Colorado Springs Switchbacks in the USL Championship.

== Career ==
=== College and amateur ===
Seth attended Baldwin High School and played club soccer for Century United, before playing four years of college soccer at Penn State Erie, The Behrend College. At PSB Seth was a four-time all-AMCC player, and helped his team capture an AMCC Championship in 2007.

During his college years Seth also played with Colorado Rapids U23's in the USL Premier Development League.

=== Professional ===
Undrafted out of college, Seth trialled with the Harrisburg City Islanders, and spent most of 2009 training with Major League Soccer side Colorado Rapids.

He turned professional in 2010 when he signed for the Pittsburgh Riverhounds of the USL Second Division, and made his professional debut on May 15, 2010, in a game against Charleston Battery. The club, now playing in the USL Pro league, re-signed him for the 2011 season on March 15, 2011.

=== Colorado Springs Switchbacks ===
Seth moved to Colorado Springs Switchbacks on February 3, 2015. Seth ended his first season with the Colorado Springs Switchbacks with 3 goals and 2 assist in 26 appearances.

On January 19, 2016, Seth resigned with the Colorado Springs Switchbacks for the 2016 USL Pro Season.

On March 12, 2016, Seth scored in a 3-2 preseason victory over UCCS.

=== Phoenix Rising ===
On December 7, 2016, Seth joined Phoenix Rising FC

=== San Antonio FC ===
On August 10, 2017, Seth signed with San Antonio FC
