= Abdul Rwatubyaye =

Rwandese footballer

Personal information
- Date of birth: 23 October 1996 (age 30)
- Place of birth: Kigali, Rwanda
- Height: 1.85 m (6 ft 1 in)
- Position: Centre back

Team information
- Current team: KF Shkëndija Haraçinë

Youth career
- –2012: A.P.R

Senior career*
Years	Team	Apps	(Gls)
2012–2013	Isonga		
2013–2016	A.P.R	21	(3)
2016–2019	Rayon Sports	22	(4)
2019	Sporting Kansas City	2	(0)
2019	→ Swope Park Rangers (loan)		
2019–2020	Colorado Rapids	0	(0)
2019–2020	→ Colorado Switchbacks (loan)	24	(3)
2021–2022	Shkupi	29	(3)
2022–2024	Rayon Sports		
2024	Shkupi	19	(3)
2024	AP Brera Strumica	12	(0)
2025	Abu Muslim		
2026	Shkëndija Haraçinë		

International career^{‡}
2015–	Rwanda	32	(3)
- * Club domestic league appearances and goals ‡ National team caps and goals as of 14 June 2024

Abdul Rwatubyaye (born 23 October 1996) is a Rwandan professional footballer who plays as a defender.

== Honours ==
Shkupi

- Macedonian First League: 2021–22
