= Jordan Burt =

American soccer player

Personal information
- Date of birth: 19 August 1990 (age 36)
- Place of birth: Elkhart, Indiana, United States
- Height: 1.85 m (6 ft 1 in)
- Positions: Right back; defensive midfielder

College career
| Years | Team | Apps | (Gls) |
| 2009–2013 | Butler Bulldogs | | |

Senior career*
| Years | Team | Apps | (Gls) |
| 2009 | Indiana Invaders | 7 | (0) |
| 2010 | Rochester Thunder | 7 | (0) |
| 2011 | Southern California Seahorses | 14 | (2) |
| 2012 | Washington Crossfire | 8 | (0) |
| 2013 | Real Colorado Foxes | 7 | (0) |
| 2014 | Carolina RailHawks | 7 | (0) |
| 2015–2021 | Colorado Springs Switchbacks | 168 | (23) |
| Total | | 218 | (25) |
- * Club domestic league appearances and goals as of November 7, 2021

Jordan Burt (born August 19, 1990) is an American former soccer player who previously played as a fullback for Colorado Springs Switchbacks in the USL Championship.

== Career ==
=== Youth and college ===
Burt attended Concord High School in Elkhart, Indiana, where he started all four years on the soccer team, scoring 48 career goals and 50 assists. Burt played five years of college soccer at Butler University between 2009 and 2013.

While at college, Burt appeared for various USL PDL clubs, including Indiana Invaders, Rochester Thunder, Southern California Seahorses, Washington Crossfire and Real Colorado Foxes.

=== Professional ===
Burt signed with North American Soccer League club Carolina RailHawks on April 15, 2014.

Burt signed with the USL’s Colorado Springs Switchbacks in 2015 as a member of the inaugural roster. He quickly became a mainstay of the starting lineup, making 21 starts over 27 appearances in his debut season.

Burt continued to help lead the Switchbacks, scoring a combined fourteen goals in the 2017 and 2018 seasons, while earning multiple USL Team of the Week selections.

Ahead of the 2019 season, Burt was named team captain in recognition of his achievements on the field as well as his leadership in the locker room. He went on to score seven goals in 32 total starts.

As of his re-signing in 2020, he is the only player remaining with Switchbacks from the club's inaugural squad. He has made the most appearances in club history with 155 and is three goals shy of the franchise record for most goals with the club in all competitions with 27.
