= Martin 'Ed' Ragain Field =

Stadium in Colorado Springs, Colorado

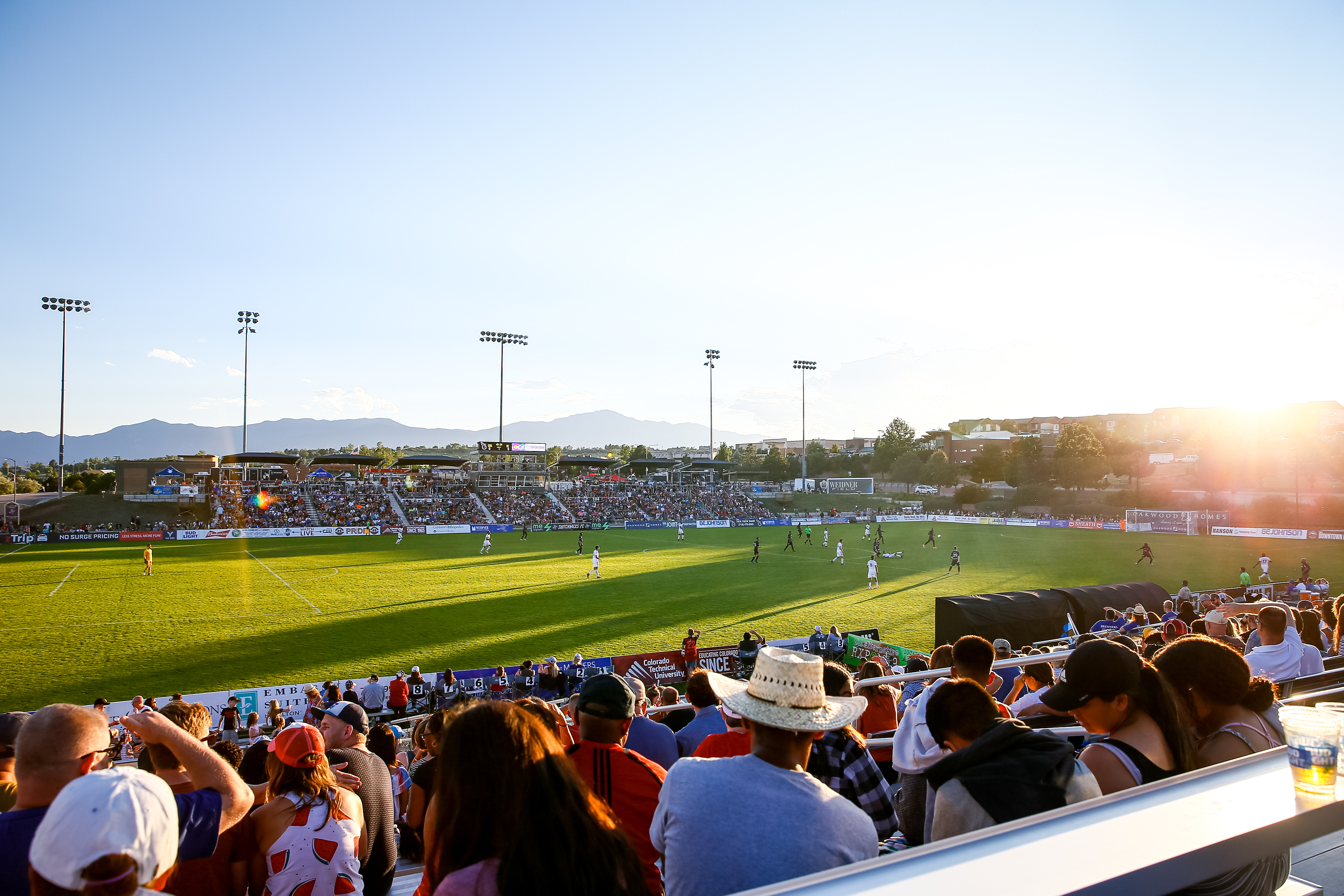
- Martin 'Ed' Ragain Field during a July 2019 match.
- Interactive map of Martin 'Ed' Ragain Field
- Former names: Weidner Field, Switchbacks Stadium, Sand Creek Stadium
- Location: 6303 Barnes Road, Colorado Springs, Colorado
- Coordinates: 38.895826°N 104.711321°W
- Owner: Colorado Springs, Parks and Recreation Department
- Capacity: 5,000
- Surface: Grass
- Field size: Grass Pitch 120 x 76

Construction
- Groundbreaking: July 23, 2014
- Built: 1985
- Opened: 1985
- Renovated: 2014–2015
- Cost: $8 million
- Architect: Populous Architects (overlay)
- Structural engineer: ME Engineers
- General contractor: Bryan Construction

Tenants
- Colorado Springs Switchbacks FC (USLC) (2015–2020); Colorado Springs Blizzard (PDL) (2005–2006)

Switchbacks Stadium Logo (2016-17)

Martin 'Ed' Ragain Field is a 5,000-seat soccer-specific stadium built in Colorado Springs, Colorado. At an altitude of roughly 6,600 feet above sea-level, the stadium had the highest elevation of any primary home stadium used by a professional team in the American soccer pyramid through the 2020 season. The stadium is immediately adjacent to UCHealth Park.

== History ==
The Colorado Springs Switchbacks FC were awarded a USL Pro franchise (now known as the USL Championship) in December 2013. On June 14, 2014, the Colorado Springs City Council approved an agreement that gave the Switchbacks a ten-year lease on the site with the right to sell naming rights in exchange for a $3M investment into facility improvements. A groundbreaking ceremony was held on July 23, 2014.

On March 7, 2016, Sand Creek Stadium had a new name proposal approved by the City of Colorado Springs changing the name to "Switchbacks Stadium". This helped avoid confusion with the name of the nearby Sand Creek High School and its stadium. On February 14, 2017, Weidner Apartment Homes purchased the stadium naming rights for an undisclosed amount, and the stadium was renamed Weidner Field.

In 2021, the Switchbacks opened a new 8,000 seat stadium in Downtown Colorado Springs. Ed Ragain and Dean Weidner formed a new partnership to build the stadium, run the team, and operate the facility. Weidner Apartment Homes also purchased the naming rights for the new stadium creating two facilities with the same name in Colorado Springs, Weidner Field. On June 24, 2022, the City of Colorado Springs renamed 6303 Barnes Rd stadium to "Martin 'Ed' Ragain Field" to commemorate the work and investment made by Ed Ragain and family.
