= Saeed Robinson =

Jamaican footballer (born 1990)

Personal information
- Date of birth: 8 August 1990 (age 36)
- Place of birth: Kingston, Jamaica
- Height: 1.74 m (5 ft 9 in)
- Position: Midfielder

Team information
- Current team: Greek American AA

Youth career
- Wolmer's Boys' School

College career
Years	Team	Apps	(Gls)
2009–2010	Western Texas Westerners	36	(29)
2011–2012	Grand Canyon Antelopes	37	(34)

Senior career*
Years	Team	Apps	(Gls)
2013	FC Tucson	13	(2)
2014	Los Angeles Misioneros	14	(2)
2015–2016	Colorado Springs Switchbacks	49	(7)
2017	North Carolina FC	7	(0)
2018–2019	Colorado Springs Switchbacks	59	(8)
2020	El Paso Locomotive	11	(3)
2022–	Greek American AA		
- * Club domestic league appearances and goals as of 14 July 2022

Saeed Robinson (born 8 August 1990) is a Jamaican footballer who plays as a midfielder for Greek American AA in the Eastern Premier Soccer League.

== Career ==
=== College and amateur ===
Robinson played four years of college soccer split between Western Texas College and Grand Canyon University, between 2009 and 2012.

Robinson also played with USL PDL clubs FC Tucson and LA Misioneros.

=== Professional ===
Robinson signed with USL club Colorado Springs Switchbacks on 9 February 2015. Robinson ended his first season with the Colorado Springs Switchbacks with 3 goals and 1 assist in 22 appearances.

On 9 December 2015 it was announced that Robinson will return with the Colorado Springs Switchbacks for the 2016 USL Pro Season. On 15 March 2016 Robinson scored in a 4-0 preseason victory against Ventura County Fusion.

On 22 January 2020, Robinson made the move to USL Championship side El Paso Locomotive.
