= Rony Argueta =

American soccer player

Personal information
- Full name: Rony Alexander Argueta
- Date of birth: January 4, 1991 (age 35)
- Place of birth: Fountain Valley, California, United States
- Height: 5 ft 8 in (1.73 m)
- Position: Defensive midfielder

Senior career*
Years	Team	Apps	(Gls)
2014	Ventura County Fusion	0	(0)
2015–2016	Colorado Springs Switchbacks	55	(3)
2017	Celaya	1	(0)
2017	Colorado Springs Switchbacks	31	(1)
2018	Fresno FC	23	(3)
2019–2021	Colorado Springs Switchbacks	58	(1)
2022	PEPO	18	(0)
2023	Ventura County Fusion	9	(0)
- * Club domestic league appearances and goals as of June 5, 2023

Rony Alexander Argueta (born January 4, 1991) is an American soccer player who plays as a midfielder.

== Early life and education ==
Argueta was born in Fountain Valley, California, but was raised in Costa Mesa, California. He attended Estancia High School where he played for the varsity soccer team for three years. While there, he also competed in football and tennis.

Argueta later enrolled at the University of California, Santa Barbara. He joined the UC Santa Barbara Gauchos men's soccer team to play college soccer, but made no appearances for the team. He later joined UCSB's club soccer team.

== Playing career ==
Argueta joined USL PDL club Ventura County Fusion just prior to their play-off run in 2014. He appeared twice in the 2014 PDL season playoffs, scoring once.

Argueta turned professional with USL franchise Colorado Springs Switchbacks FC, signing a contract in January 2015. In his first year with the club, he made 24 appearances and scored twice. He was re-signed for the following season. Argueta won the Back Chat Supporters 2016 Young Player of the Season award.

On December 17, 2016, it was announced via Twitter he had joined Celaya F.C.

On February 9, 2017, it was announced that Switchbacks FC had brought back Argueta for the 2017 season.

On December 15, 2017, it was announced that Argueta had signed with USL side Fresno FC for the 2018 season.
