= 2019 Phoenix Rising FC season =

American professional soccer season

Phoenix Rising FC
2019 season
- Owners: (Turkey) Berke Bakay (United States) Brett M. Johnson (Hong Kong) Alex Zheng (United States) Tim Riester (United States) Mark Detmer (Ivory Coast) Didier Drogba (United States) Brandon McCarthy (United States) Diplo (United States) Pete Wentz (United States) David Rappaport (United States) Dave Stearns (United States) Rick Hauser (United States) William Kraus (United States) Kevin Kusatsu (United States) Dr. Mark Leber (United States) Jim Scussel (United States) Dr. Christopher Yeung
- Manager: (United States) Rick Schantz
- Stadium: Casino Arizona Field
- USL Championship: 1st, Western Conference; Regular Season Winners
- USL Playoffs: Conference Semifinals
- U.S. Open Cup: 2nd round
- Four Corners Cup: 3rd place
- Top goalscorer: Solomon Asante (22) (Club Record)
- Highest home attendance: 7,606 (October 18 v. OKC Energy FC)
- Lowest home attendance: 6,372 (June 29 v. Portland Timbers 2)
- Average home league attendance: Regular Season: 6,752; Playoffs: 7,095
- Biggest win: 6–0 (July 19 v. Austin Bold FC)
- Biggest defeat: 0–1 (April 17 at Austin Bold FC); 1–2 (May 4 at Orange County SC); 1–2 (September 21 at Fresno FC); 1–2 (October 12 vs Real Monarchs); 1–2 (November 1 vs Real Monarchs)
Home colors	Away colors	Third colors

The 2019 Phoenix Rising FC season was the club's sixth season in the USL Championship and their third as Rising FC. They are the defending Western Conference Champions.

== Competitions ==
=== Friendlies ===
February 2, 2019 Friendly	Phoenix Rising FC	0–0	Minnesota United FC	Tucson, Arizona
2:00pm		Report		Stadium: Kino North Stadium

February 7, 2019 Friendly	Phoenix Rising FC	2–3	Sporting Kansas City	Scottsdale, Arizona
6:00pm	Neagle 70' (1st game); Lambert 28' (2nd game)	Report	Russell 56' (1st game); Zusi 72' (1st game); Freeman 1' (2nd game)	Stadium: Phoenix Rising Soccer Complex
Note: Two 75 minute games; aggregate score

February 10, 2019 Friendly	Phoenix Rising FC	1–5	New York Red Bulls	Oro Valley, Arizona
1:00pm	Spencer 42'	Report; Report	Wright-Phillips 6', 38', 63'; Kaku 40'; Muyl 56'	Stadium: Naranja Park

February 16, 2019 Mobile Mini Sun Cup	Phoenix Rising FC	1–4	Real Salt Lake	Scottsdale, Arizona
7:00pm	Jahn 2' (yellow card) 24'; Dia (yellow card) 34'	Report; Report	Kreilach 11', 42'; Lennon 62' (pen.); Savarino 74'	Stadium: Phoenix Rising Soccer Complex; Attendance: 5,867

February 20, 2019 Mobile Mini Sun Cup	Phoenix Rising FC	2–5	New York Red Bulls	Tucson, Arizona
3:00pm	Johnson 29'; Calistri 67'		DeSousa 32'; Stroud 47'; Valot 49'; Barlow 52'; Elney 81'	Stadium: Kino North Stadium

February 20, 2019 Mobile Mini Sun Cup	Phoenix Rising FC	1–0	Portland Timbers	Tucson, Arizona
6:00pm	Dia (yellow card) 71'; Jahn 87'; Mala (red card) 90'	Report; Report	Dielna (yellow card) 70'; Blanco (red card) 90'	Stadium: Kino North Stadium

February 23, 2019 Mobile Mini Sun Cup	Phoenix Rising FC	0–2	OKC Energy FC	Tucson, Arizona
2:30pm	Cochran (yellow card) 51'; Farrell (yellow card) 68'; Flemmings (yellow card) 75'; Musa (red card) 88'	Report	Brown 11'; Gordon 26'	Stadium: Kino North Stadium

=== USL Championship ===
All times from this point on Mountain Standard Time (UTC-07:00)

=== Results summary ===
Overall								Home						Away					
Pld	W	D	L	GF	GA	GD	Pts	W	D	L	GF	GA	GD	W	D	L	GF	GA	GD
34	24	6	4	89	36	+53	78	13	3	1	51	16	+35	11	3	3	38	20	+18

Source: Match reports

Round	1	2	3	4	5	6	7	8	9	10	11	12	13	14	15	16	17	18	19	20	21	22	23	24	25	26	27	28	29	30	31	32	33	34
Stadium	A	H	H	H	A	A	H	A	A	H	H	A	H	H	A	A	H	A	H	A	A	H	H	H	A	A	H	A	H	A	A	A	H	H
Result	D	D	D	D	W	L	W	D	L	W	W	W	W	W	W	W	W	W	W	W	W	W	W	W	W	W	W	W	W	L	D	W	L	W

Updated to match(es) played on October 18, 2019. Source: Match reports
A = Away; H = Home; W = Win; D = Draw; L = Loss

=== League results ===
March 9, 2019 1	San Antonio FC	3–3	Phoenix Rising FC	San Antonio, Texas
	Guzmán 9'; Forbes 40'; Greene (yellow card) 59'; Jahn 80' (o.g.)	Report; Report	Flemmings 22' (yellow card) 74'; Lambert (yellow card) 33'; Jahn 43' (yellow card) 61'; Mala (yellow card) 78'; Dumbuya (yellow card) 82'; Johnson 90+3'	Stadium: Toyota Field; Attendance: 8,058; Referee: Malik Badawi

March 16, 2019 2	Phoenix Rising FC	3–3	New Mexico United	Scottsdale, Arizona
7:30pm	Pérez (yellow card) 11'; Asante 29' (pen.) (yellow card) 40' (goal) 48' (pen.); Jahn (yellow card) 35'; Johnson 71'	Report; Report	Moar 16' (yellow card) 33' (goal) 55'; Estrada (yellow card) 24'; Mizell (yellow card) 28'; Frater 30' (yellow card) 72'; Williams (yellow card) 63'; Schmidt (yellow card) 81'	Stadium: Casino Arizona Field; Attendance: 6,607; Referee: Alejandro Mariscal

March 30, 2019 3	Phoenix Rising FC	2–2	Colorado Springs Switchbacks	Scottsdale, Arizona
7:30pm	Jahn (yellow card) 41' (goal) 86'; Farrell 44'	Report; Report	Burt 26'; Jome 90+1'	Stadium: Casino Arizona Field; Attendance: 6,446; Referee: Greg Dopka

April 6, 2019 4	Phoenix Rising FC	0–0	Fresno FC	Scottsdale, Arizona
7:30pm	Lambert (yellow card) 69'	Report; Report	Moses (yellow card) 11' (red card) 40'; Martin (yellow card) 75'	Stadium: Casino Arizona Field; Attendance: 6,433; Referee: Farhad Dadkho

April 13, 2019 5	El Paso Locomotive	0–2	Phoenix Rising FC	El Paso, Texas
6:30pm		Report; Report	Flemmings 7'; Lambert (yellow card) 69'; Spencer 77'; Fernandez (yellow card) 88'	Stadium: Southwest University Park; Attendance: 7,389; Referee: Mark Allatin

April 17, 2018 6	Austin Bold FC	1–0	Phoenix Rising FC	Austin, Texas
5:30 PM	Mallace (yellow card) 40'; Guadarrama 52'	Report; Report	Pérez (yellow card) 11'; Flemmings (yellow card) 65'; Spencer (yellow card) 71'; Asante (yellow card) 74'	Stadium: Bold Stadium; Attendance: 1,615; Referee: Jon Freemon

April 20, 2019 7	Phoenix Rising FC	4–0	Tacoma Defiance	Scottsdale, Arizona
7:30pm	Flemmings 34', 44'; Johnson 37'; Asante 53'; Blackmon (yellow card) 90'	Report; Report	Hinds (yellow card) 45+1'; Ulysse (yellow card) 65'	Stadium: Casino Arizona Field; Attendance: 6,534; Referee: Guido Gonzales, Jr.

April 27, 2019 8	Sacramento Republic FC	0–0	Phoenix Rising FC	Sacramento, California
7:30pm	Gomez (yellow card) 53'; Alemán (yellow card) 81'	Report; Report	Fernandez (yellow card) 10'	Stadium: Papa Murphy's Park; Attendance: 11,569; Referee: Elton Garcia

May 4, 2019 9	Orange County SC	2–1	Phoenix Rising FC	Irvine, California
7:00pm	Quinn 28' (pen.); Alston (yellow card) 33'; Vinicius (yellow card) 48'; Seaton 57'; Forrester (yellow card) 63'; Kontor (yellow card) 69'; Jones (yellow card) 79'; McLain (yellow card) 90+3'	Report; Report	Lambert (yellow card) 26'; Jahn (yellow card) 47' (goal) 70'	Stadium: Champions Stadium; Attendance: 5,013; Referee: Michael Radchuk

May 10, 2019 10	Phoenix Rising FC	3–1	Rio Grande Valley Toros	Scottsdale, Arizona
7:30pm	Jahn 16', 28' (pen.); Musa 69'	Report; Report	Foster 71'	Stadium: Casino Arizona Field; Attendance: 6,715; Referee: Dejan Susak

May 18, 2019 11	Phoenix Rising FC	4–0	Las Vegas Lights	Scottsdale, Arizona
7:30pm	Lambert 40'; Asante 51'; Bjornethun (yellow card) 73'; Jahn 77'; Flemmings 90+2'	Report; Report	Fehr (yellow card) 31' (red card) 82'; Hernández (yellow card) 79'; Ochoa (yellow card) 80'	Stadium: Casino Arizona Field; Attendance: 6,474; Referee: Mark Allatin

May 25, 2019 12	Real Monarchs	2–4	Phoenix Rising FC	Herriman, Utah
	Silva 10', (yellow card) 73'; Martínez 25'; Ávila (yellow card) 45'; Powder (yellow card) 67'	Report; Report	Jahn 32'; Bakero 35'; Farrell (yellow card) 45'; Flemmings 60'; Dia (yellow card) 69'; Asante 81'	Stadium: Zions Bank Stadium; Attendance: 2,936; Referee: Farhad Dadkho

June 7, 2019 13	Phoenix Rising FC	5–0	Tulsa Roughnecks FC	Scottsdale, Arizona
7:30pm	Jahn 13'; Flemmings 25', 65'; Asante 41' (pen.); Wheeler-Omiunu 71'	Report; Report	Roberts (yellow card) 40'	Stadium: Casino Arizona Field; Attendance: 6,708; Referee: Elijio Arreguin

June 15, 2019 14	Phoenix Rising FC	3–0	Orange County SC	Scottsdale, Arizona
7:30pm	Alston 6' (o.g.); Calistri 17'; Asante 50'; Mala (yellow card) 60'; Musa (yellow card) 69'	Report	Crisostomo (yellow card) 19'; Vinicius (yellow card) 37'	Stadium: Casino Arizona Field; Attendance: 6,562; Referee: Victor Rivas

June 18, 2019 15	Reno 1868 FC	0–3	Phoenix Rising FC	Reno, Nevada
7:30pm	Mendiola (yellow card) 24'; Galindo (yellow card) 59'	Report; Report	Jahn 7'; Musa (yellow card) 22'; Asante 56'; Calistri (yellow card) 66', (goal) 90+5'; Fernandez (yellow card) 90'	Stadium: Greater Nevada Field; Attendance: 4,262; Referee: Malik Badawi

June 22, 2019 16	OKC Energy FC	1–4	Phoenix Rising FC	Oklahoma City, Oklahoma
6:00pm	Garcia 31' (pen.), (yellow card) 48' da Fonte (yellow card) 58'; Harris (yellow card) 78'	Report; Report	Farrell (yellow card) 9' (red card) 29'; Harris 15' (o.g.); Asante 18', 79', (yellow card) 48'; Bakero 54'	Stadium: Taft Stadium; Attendance: 4,422; Referee: Elvis Osmanovic

June 29, 2019 17	Phoenix Rising FC	4–2	Portland Timbers 2	Scottsdale, Arizona
7:30pm	Asante 32' (pen.), 90+7' (pen.); Dia 62', 90+4'	Report; Report	Smith (yellow card) 32'; Ojeda 37'; Hurtado 49'; Hanson (yellow card) 52'	Stadium: Casino Arizona Field; Attendance: 6,372; Referee: Matthew Thompson

July 13, 2019 18	Rio Grande Valley Toros	0–1	Phoenix Rising FC	Edinburg, Texas
7:30pm	Enríquez (yellow card) 38'; Rodríguez (yellow card) 90+3'	Report; Report	Asante (yellow card) 32'; Jahn 62'; Musa (yellow card) 85'; Aguinaga (yellow card) 87'	Stadium: H-E-B Park; Attendance: 3,339; Referee: Elton García

July 19, 2019 19	Phoenix Rising FC	6–0	Austin Bold FC	Scottsdale, Arizona
7:30pm	Asante 17', 58'; Musa 54'; Jahn 66'; Bakero 76'; Farrell (yellow card) 80'; Calistri 84'	Report; Report	Okugo (yellow card) 28'; Saramutin (yellow card) 41'; Woodberry (yellow card) 51'; Braafheid (red card) 73'	Stadium: Casino Arizona Field; Attendance: 7,387; Referee: Dejan Susak

July 27, 2019 20	Tulsa Roughnecks FC	0–1	Phoenix Rising FC	Tulsa, Oklahoma
5:30pm	Mompremier (red card) 45'; Altamirano (yellow card) 59' da Costa (yellow card) 67'; Roberts (yellow card) 86'; Ajeakwa (yellow card) 87'	Report; Report	Dumbuya (yellow card) 17'; Musa (yellow card) 34'; Farrell (yellow card) 41'; Aguinaga (yellow card) 44'; Lambert 69'	Stadium: ONEOK Field; Attendance: 2,529; Referee: Eric Tattersall

August 3, 2019 21	LA Galaxy II	2–3	Phoenix Rising FC	Carson, California
7:00pm	Vera (yellow card) 28'; Álvarez (yellow card) 33', (goal) 52' (pen.); Zubak 39'	Report; Report	Cochran (yellow card) 51'; Asante 58'; Flemmings 74'; Calistri 83'	Stadium: StubHub Track & Field Stadium; Attendance: 1,004; Referee: Calin Radosav

August 10, 2019 22	Phoenix Rising FC	2–1	El Paso Locomotive	Scottsdale, Arizona
7:30pm	Aguinaga 21'; Jahn (yellow card) 40'; Asante 73' (pen.)	Report; Report	Partida 26'; Kiffe (yellow card) 41' (red card) 45'; Contreras (yellow card) 42'; Velásquez (yellow card) 45'	Stadium: Casino Arizona Field; Attendance: 6,520; Referee: Guido Gonzales, Jr.

August 16, 2019 23	Phoenix Rising FC	4–2	Reno 1868 FC	Scottsdale, Arizona
7:30pm	Flemmings 20'; Asante 59' (pen.), 79' (pen.); Dumbuya 61'	Report; Report	Musovski 53'; Hertzog 74'	Stadium: Casino Arizona Field; Attendance: 7,046; Referee: Mark Allatin

August 23, 2019 24	Phoenix Rising FC	2–1	Sacramento Republic FC	Scottsdale, Arizona
7:30pm	Barahona 7' (o.g.); Farrell 44'; Vassell (yellow card) 66'; Mala (yellow card) 85' (red card) 90'	Report; Report	Iwasa 2'; Barahona (yellow card) 49'; McCrary (yellow card) 70'	Stadium: Casino Arizona Field; Attendance: 7,403; Referee: Ismir Pekmic

August 27, 2019 25	Tacoma Defiance	2–4	Phoenix Rising FC	Tacoma, Washington
7:00pm	Hopeau 26' (pen.); Bwana 72'	Report; Report	Musa (yellow card) 1'; Jahn 2', 83'; Lambert (yellow card) 67'; Asante 81'; Flemmings 84'	Stadium: Cheney Stadium; Attendance: 2,710; Referee: Alejandro Mariscal

August 31, 2019 26	Colorado Springs Switchbacks	0–3	Phoenix Rising FC	Colorado Springs, Colorado
5:00pm	Reaves (yellow card) 37'; Jack (yellow card) 45+4'; Schweitzer (yellow card) 64'	Report; Report	Aguinaga 5', (yellow card) 83'; Asante 8'; Jahn 27'; Calistri (yellow card) 82'	Stadium: Weidner Field; Attendance: 4,139; Referee: Brad Jensen

September 7, 2019 27	Phoenix Rising FC	1–0	San Antonio FC	Scottsdale, Arizona
7:30pm	Aguinaga (yellow card) 64'; Musa (yellow card) 74'; Asante 87'; Dia (yellow card) 90+3'	Report; Report	Pecka (yellow card) 80'; Hernández (yellow card) 83'; Barmby (yellow card) 89'	Stadium: Casino Arizona Field; Attendance: 6,466; Referee: Rosendo Mendoza

September 11, 2019 28	Las Vegas Lights	0–1	Phoenix Rising FC	Las Vegas, Nevada
7:30pm	Tabortetaka (yellow card) 65'; Villarreal (yellow card) 88'	Report; Report	Calistri (yellow card) 49'; Jahn 62'	Stadium: Cashman Field; Attendance: 5,101; Referee: David Barrie

September 14, 2019 29	Phoenix Rising FC	4–1	LA Galaxy II	Scottsdale, Arizona
7:30pm	Asante 10' (pen.); Flemmings 15', 45'; Lambert (yellow card) 18'; Cochran (yellow card) 27'; Spencer 77'	Report; Report	Harvey (yellow card) 8'; Koreniuk (yellow card) 51', (goal) 76'; Hernández (yellow card) 62'	Stadium: Casino Arizona Field; Attendance: 6,647; Referee: Elijio Arreguin
Note: Match was abandoned in the 84th minute after projectiles were thrown onto the pitch. Both teams left the field for their safety. Per USL Championship rules, the game was declared official.

September 21, 2019 30	Fresno FC	2–1	Phoenix Rising FC	Fresno, California
7:30pm	Ellis-Hayden (yellow card) 40'; Lawal 68', (yellow card) 75'; Kurimoto (yellow card) 77'; Chavez 83' (pen.); Martin (yellow card) 85'; Daly (yellow card) 90+2'	Report; Report	Dia (yellow card) 75'; Flemmings 78'; Dumbuya (yellow card) 81'	Stadium: Chukchansi Park; Attendance: 4,523; Referee: Elton García

September 28, 2019 31	New Mexico United	2–2	Phoenix Rising FC	Albuquerque, New Mexico
6:30p	Sandoval 4'; Frater (yellow card) 41'; Hamilton (yellow card) 48'; Schmidt 53'; Padilla (yellow card) 58'; Guzmán (yellow card) 68'	Report; Report	Jahn (yellow card) 13'; Calistri 74', 90'	Stadium: Isotopes Park; Attendance: 13,009; Referee: Michael Radchuk

October 5, 2019 32	Portland Timbers 2	3–5	Phoenix Rising FC	Portland, Oregon
7:00pm	Calixtro 24'; Anguiano (yellow card) 31'; Ojeda (yellow card) 31'; Diz (yellow card) 45+4' (red card) 66'; Hurtado 73'; Ledbetter 76' (o.g.); Wharton (yellow card) 86'; Ornstil (yellow card) 86'	Report; Report	Lambert 4', (yellow card) 38'; Spencer 35', 70'; Flemmings 54'; Mala (yellow card) 82'; Aguinaga 88'	Stadium: Providence Park; Attendance: 1,213; Referee: Luis Guardia

October 12, 2019 33	Phoenix Rising FC	1–2	Real Monarchs	Scottsdale, Arizona
7:30pm	Musa (yellow card) 54'; Asante (yellow card) 73'; Spencer 82'; Dia (yellow card) 86'; Whelan (red card) 89'	Report; Report	Jasso (yellow card) 31'; Chang 74' (pen.); Plewa (red card) 89'; Coffee 90+3'	Stadium: Casino Arizona Field; Attendance: 6,863; Referee: Malik Badawi

October 18, 2019 34	Phoenix Rising FC	3–1	OKC Energy FC	Scottsdale, Arizona
7:30pm	Jahn 21', 70'; Lubin (yellow card) 26'; Lambert 32'	Report; Report	Ibeagha (yellow card) 13'; Harris (yellow card) 50'; Ross (yellow card) 62'; Brown 73'; Hyland (yellow card) 82'; Williams (yellow card) 90'	Stadium: Casino Arizona Field; Attendance: 7,606; Referee: Dejan Susak

=== USL Championship Playoffs ===
==== Conference Playoffs ====
October 26, 2019 Quarterfinals	Phoenix Rising FC	0–0 (a.e.t.) (8–7 p)	Austin Bold FC	Scottsdale, Arizona
7:30 pm MST	Lambert (yellow card) 70'; Jahn (yellow card) 86'	Report; Report	Soto (yellow card) 14'; McFarlane (yellow card) 35'; Guadarrama (yellow card) 68' de Villardi (yellow card) 95'	Stadium: Casino Arizona Field; Attendance: 6,642; Referee: Elvis Osmanovic
	Penalties
	Flemmings (penalty scored); Bakero (penalty scored); Calistri (penalty scored); Lambert (penalty missed); Spencer (penalty scored); Farrell (penalty scored); Johnson (penalty scored); Dia (penalty scored); Cochran (penalty scored)		(penalty scored) Tyrpak; (penalty missed) de Villardi; (penalty scored) McFarlane; (penalty scored) Soto; (penalty scored) Braafheid; (penalty scored) Okugo; (penalty scored) Atuahene; (penalty scored) Twumasi; (penalty missed) Taylor

November 1, 2019 Semifinals	Phoenix Rising FC	1–2	Real Monarchs	Scottsdale, Arizona
7:30 pm MST	Flemmings 25'; Asante (yellow card) 47'	Report; Report	Blake 33', (yellow card) 61'; Chang 43'; Powder (yellow card) 84'	Stadium: Casino Arizona Field; Attendance: 7,548; Referee: Jon Freemon

=== Western Conference standings ===
Pos	Team	Pld	W	D	L	GF	GA	GD	Pts	Qualification
1	Phoenix Rising FC (X)	34	24	6	4	89	36	+53	78	Conference Quarterfinals
2	Reno 1868 FC	34	18	6	10	72	51	+21	60	Conference Quarterfinals
3	Fresno FC	34	16	9	9	58	44	+14	57	Conference Quarterfinals
4	Real Monarchs (C)	34	16	8	10	71	53	+18	56	Conference Quarterfinals
5	Orange County SC	34	15	9	10	54	43	+11	54	Conference Quarterfinals

Source: USL Championship Standings
Rules for classification: 1) total wins; 2) total goal differential; 3) total goals scored; 4) points earned against top four Conference finishers; 5) disciplinary points; 6) coin toss or drawing of lots
(C) Champions; (X) Regular Season League Champion

=== U.S. Open Cup ===
As a member of the USL Championship, Phoenix Rising entered the tournament proper in the Second Round.

May 15, 2019 Second Round	Phoenix Rising FC	2–2 (3–4 p)	New Mexico United	Scottsdale, Arizona
7:30pm	Flemmings 65' (pen.); Musa (yellow card) 80'; Jahn 101'	Report; Report	Muhammad (yellow card) 28'; Frater (yellow card) 44'; Sandoval 79', 95'; Moar (yellow card) 90+3'	Stadium: Casino Arizona Field; Attendance: 2,500; Referee: Dejan Susak
	Penalties
	Jahn (penalty scored); Asante (penalty scored); Dia (penalty missed); Spencer (penalty scored); Cochran (penalty missed)		(penalty scored) Wehan; (penalty scored) Moar; (penalty scored) Sandoval; (penalty missed) Suggs; (penalty scored) Schmidt

== Statistics ==
(regular-season & Playoffs)

#	Pos.	Name	GP	GS	Min.	Goals	Assists	A yellow rectangle, denoting the yellow penalty card shown to a player being cautioned	A red rectangle, denoting the red penalty card shown to a player being sent off
20	MF	(Ghana) Solomon Asante	34	33	2940	22	17	6	0
9	FW	(United States) Adam Jahn	33	32	2890	17	6	7	0
7	MF	(Jamaica) Junior Flemmings	30	25	2275	16	7	2	0
21	FW	(United States) Joey Calistri	31	12	1335	6	2	3	0
22	FW	(United States) Ben Spencer	18	2	343	5	0	1	0
27	MF	(Jamaica) Kevon Lambert	28	23	2208	4	1	7	0
19	MF	(Spain) Jose Aguinaga	31	29	2315	3	7	4	0
10	MF	(Spain) Jon Bakero	26	22	1855	3	5	0	0
14	FW	(Jamaica) Jason Johnson	14	5	458	3	1	0	0
13	DF	(United States) Amadou Dia	33	32	2925	2	2	5	0
41	DF	(New Zealand) James Musa	28	20	1841	2	2	7	0
15	DF	(United States) Joe Farrell	26	21	1891	2	1	3	1
24	DF	(Sierra Leone) Mustapha Dumbuya	28	27	2268	1	1	3	0
35	MF	(United States) Andrew Wheeler-Omiunu	6	0	70	1	1	0	0
3	DF	(United States) A. J. Cochran	26	26	2341	0	4	2	0
2	DF	(Ivory Coast) Doueugui Mala	16	15	1348	0	1	3	1
4	DF	(Republic of Ireland) Corey Whelan	9	9	838	0	1	0	1
16	MF	(United States) Austin Ledbetter	8	5	536	0	0	0	0
8	MF	(Peru) Collin Fernandez	10	5	439	0	0	4	0
33	DF	(United States) Tristan Blackmon	5	4	390	0	0	1	0
8	MF	(Jamaica) Peter-Lee Vassell	6	3	288	0	1	1	0
32	DF	(United States) Kyle Bjornethun	5	3	272	0	1	1	0
6	MF	(Spain) Javi Pérez	3	3	225	0	0	2	0
4	DF	(United States) Lamar Batista	2	2	180	0	0	0	0
23	MF	(United States) Devin Vega	3	1	124	0	0	0	0
5	FW	(United States) Shaft Brewer Jr.	1	0	45	0	0	0	0
18	FW	(United States) Joshua Pérez	1	0	2	0	0	0	0

- One Own Goal scored by Orange County SC, OKC Energy FC, Sacramento Republic FC

=== Goalkeepers ===
#	Name	GP	GS	Min.	SV	GA	GAA	SO	A yellow rectangle, denoting the yellow penalty card shown to a player being cautioned	A red rectangle, denoting the red penalty card shown to a player being sent off
28	(United States) Zac Lubin	31	31	2820	87	27	.863	14	1	0
1	(United States) Carl Woszczynski	5	5	450	20	11	2.200	1	0	0

== Transfers ==
=== Loan in ===
Start date	End date	Position	No.	Player	From club
February 16, 2019	May 18, 2019	Defender	16	(United States) Logan Gdula	(United States) FC Cincinnati
March 7, 2019	End of Season	Defender	4	(United States) Lamar Batista	(United States) Los Angeles FC
March 14, 2019	End of Season	Defender	33	(United States) Tristan Blackmon	(United States) Los Angeles FC
March 14, 2019	July 28, 2019	Defender	5	(United States) Shaft Brewer Jr.	(United States) Los Angeles FC
March 14, 2019	End of Season	Midfielder	6	(Spain) Javi Pérez	(United States) Los Angeles FC
March 14, 2019	End of Season	Forward	18	(United States) Joshua Pérez	(United States) Los Angeles FC
March 20, 2019	End of Season	Midfielder	10	(Spain) Jon Bakero	(Canada) Toronto FC
April 26, 2019	End of Season	Defender	16	(United States) Austin Ledbetter	(United States) FC Tucson
April 27, 2019	End of Season	Defender	32	(United States) Kyle Bjornethun	(United States) FC Tucson
May 24, 2019	End of Season	Midfielder	35	(United States) Andrew Wheeler-Omiunu	(United States) FC Tucson
August 15, 2019	End of Season	Midfielder	8	(Jamaica) Peter-Lee Vassell	(United States) Los Angeles FC

=== Loan out ===
Start date	End date	Position	No.	Player	To club
April 2, 2019	End of Season	Midfielder	23	(United States) Devin Vega	(United States) FC Tucson
April 11, 2019	End of Season	Forward	25	(United States) Ilijah Paul	(United States) FC Tucson
April 30, 2019	End of Season	Forward	21	(United States) Joey Calistri	(United States) FC Tucson
April 30, 2019	End of Season	Forward	25	(United States) Ben Spencer	(United States) FC Tucson

== See also ==
- 2019 in American soccer
- 2019 USL Championship season
- Phoenix Rising FC
- Casino Arizona Field
