= 2018 Portland Timbers 2 season =

Portland Timbers 2
2018 season
- Head coach: Cameron Knowles
- Stadium: Providence Park; Portland, Oregon (Capacity: 21,144)
- United Soccer League: Conference: 6th Overall: 10th
- USL Playoffs: Quarterfinals PHX 3–0 POR (October 19)

The 2018 Portland Timbers 2 season was the 4th season for Portland Timbers 2 in the United Soccer League (USL), the second-tier professional soccer league in the United States and Canada.

== Club ==
No.	Position	Nation	Player
7	DF	CRC	Roy Miller
17	FW	USA	Jeremy Ebobisse
18	DF	CRC	Julio Cascante
19	FW	COL	Victor Arboleda
23	MF	ENG	Jack Barmby
25	DF	NZL	Bill Tuiloma
26	DF	GAM	Modou Jadama
27	FW	COL	Dairon Asprilla
28	FW	USA	Foster Langsdorf
30	MF	USA	Eryk Williamson
35	MF	ARG	Tomás Conechny
36	FW	ARG	Lucas Melano
40	MF	VEN	Renzo Zambrano
41	GK	USA	Alex Mangels
42	DF	USA	Nathan Smith
43	GK	USA	Kendall McIntosh
44	FW	CRC	Marvin Loría (on loan from Saprissa)
45	DF	USA	Harold Hanson
48	DF	USA	Max Ornstil
49	DF	USA	Josh Phillips
53	FW	ZIM	Devyn Jambga
61	GK	USA	Austin Pack
73	MF	USA	Vitalis Takawira
76	DF	USA	Kyle Gruno
77	MF	JAM	Andre Lewis
80	FW	SLE	Augustine Williams
83	DF	ENG	Max Elliott
84	DF	USA	Jimmy Mulligan
87	DF	CUB	Adrián Diz
89	MF	USA	Terrell Lowe
91	FW	USA	Gio Calixtro
93	FW	USA	Kashope Oladapo
94	MF	USA	Carlos Anguiano
96	MF	USA	Christian Enriquez
98	DF	USA	Lamar Batista

Signed to first team contract with Portland Timbers.
Portland Timbers Academy player.

== Competitions ==
=== Preseason ===
Win Draw Loss Upcoming fixture

March 9, 2018 PRE 1	Portland Timbers 2	3–1	University of Portland	Portland, Oregon
19:00 (PST)		Report		Stadium: Merlo Field

=== Regular season ===
Win Draw Loss Upcoming fixture

March 16, 2018 USL 1	Seattle Sounders FC 2	2–1	Portland Timbers 2	Tacoma, Washington
19:00 (PST)	Alfaro (yellow card) 28'; Chenkam 43' (pen.); Hinds 45' (Olsen); Ulysse (yellow card) 78'; Morris (yellow card) 85'	Report	Williams 30' (Mulligan)	Stadium: Cheney Stadium; Attendance: 6,089; Referee: Victor Rivas

March 24, 2018 USL 2	Colorado Springs Switchbacks FC	0–1	Portland Timbers 2	Colorado Springs, Colorado
17:00 (PST)	Kim (yellow card) 35'; Välimaa (yellow card) 89'	Report	Mulligan (yellow card) 58'; Phillips (yellow card) 73'; Williams 82'; Arboleda (yellow card) 90+1'	Stadium: Weidner Field; Attendance: 2,591; Referee: Kevin Stott

March 31, 2018 USL 3	Real Monarchs SLC	2–4	Portland Timbers 2	Sandy, Utah
12:00 (PST)	Besler 3' (Ruíz); Ryden 7' (Portillo) 32' (Portillo); Gallagher (yellow card) 54'; Velásquez 66' (Heard)	Report	Jadama (yellow card) 31'; Ebobisse 35'; Arboleda 59' (Lewis)	Stadium: Rio Tinto Stadium; Attendance: 2,514; Referee: Brad Jensen

April 4, 2018 USL 4	Tulsa Roughnecks FC	0–0	Portland Timbers 2	Tulsa, Oklahoma
17:00 (PST)	Montano (yellow card) 38'; Maidana (yellow card) 83'; Arce (yellow card) 90+4'	Report	Arboleda (yellow card) 42'; Williamson (yellow card) 81'	Stadium: ONEOK Field; Attendance: 2,432; Referee: Alejandro Mariscal

April 7, 2018 USL 5	OKC Energy FC	0–3	Portland Timbers 2	Oklahoma City, Oklahoma
17:00 (PST)	Ibeagha (yellow card) 83'	Report	Langsdorf 34' (Williams) (yellow card) 45'; Vytas (yellow card) 38'; Arboleda 54' (Williams); McIntosh (yellow card) 57'; Batista 84' (pen.)	Stadium: Taft Stadium; Attendance: 4,041; Referee: Marco Vega

April 18, 2018 USL 6	Portland Timbers 2	3–2	Rio Grande Valley FC Toros	Portland, Oregon
19:00 (PST)	Ebobisse 56'; Barmby 61' (pen.), (yellow card) 76'; Langsdorf 68' (Lowe); Batista (yellow card) 22' (yellow card) 90+2' (red card)	Report	Ontiveros 30' (Donovan); Padilla (yellow card) 33'; Etim (yellow card) 45+2'; Wharton 81' (pen.); Zaldívar (yellow card) 42' (yellow card) 90+4' (red card)	Stadium: Merlo Field; Attendance: 1,748; Referee: Ismir Pekmic

April 21, 2018 USL 7	Portland Timbers 2	1–2	Reno 1868 FC	Portland, Oregon
19:00 (PST)	Arboleda 38'; Williams (yellow card) 85'	Report	Musovski 75' (Hoppenot) 89' (Hoppenot); Hoppenot (yellow card) 80'	Stadium: Merlo Field; Attendance: 1,834; Referee: Farhad Dadkho

May 2, 2018 USL 8	Portland Timbers 2	2–0	Sacramento Republic FC	Portland, Oregon
19:00 (PST)	Asprilla 16'; Zambrano (yellow card) 21'; Jadama 38' (Williamson); Williams (yellow card) 90'	Report		Stadium: Providence Park; Attendance: 1,937; Referee: Mark Allatin

May 5, 2018 USL 9	Saint Louis FC	0–0	Portland Timbers 2	Fenton, Missouri
17:30 (PST)	Fink (yellow card) 35'; Hertzog (yellow card) 85'	Report	Williamson (yellow card) 45+2'; Batista (yellow card) 61'; Mulligan (yellow card) 65'; Williams (yellow card) 89'	Stadium: Toyota Stadium; Attendance: 4,039; Referee: Jonathan Bilinski

May 12, 2018 USL 10	Seattle Sounders FC 2	0–1	Portland Timbers 2	Tacoma, Washington
17:00 (PST)	Ele (yellow card) 10'; Narbón (yellow card) 62'	Report	Williamson (yellow card) 49' (goal) 90+2' (Arboleda); Jadama (yellow card) 56'	Stadium: Cheney Stadium; Attendance: 4,602; Referee: Elijio Arreguin

May 18, 2018 USL 11	Portland Timbers 2	7–3	LA Galaxy II	Portland, Oregon
11:00 (PST)	Langsdorf 25' (Arboleda) 43' (Mulligan) 57' (pen.); Loría (yellow card) 58'; Tuiloma (yellow card) 80'; Williamson 81' (Loría); Lewis (yellow card) 87'; Loría 90+1'; Arboleda 90+4'; Williams 90+5' (Loría)	Report	Aguilar (yellow card) 47' (goal) 59' (Appiah); Alvarez 49' (Aguilar) 68'; Appiah (yellow card) 90+1'	Stadium: Providence Park; Attendance: 5,857; Referee: Mike Hohnholz

May 26, 2018 USL 12	Portland Timbers 2	1–0	Real Monarchs SLC	Portland, Oregon
14:00 (PST)	Asprilla (yellow card) 36' (goal) 77' (Zambrano); Vytas (yellow card) 50'	Report	Peay (yellow card) 56'	Stadium: Providence Park; Attendance: 1,548; Referee: Rosendo Mendoza

June 2, 2018 USL 13	San Antonio FC	2–1	Portland Timbers 2	San Antonio, Texas
17:30 (PST)	King (yellow card) 50'; Elizondo (yellow card) 62'; Gordon 86' (King); Bruce 90+3'	Report	Williams 50' (pen.); Lewis (yellow card) 59'; Lowe (yellow card) 77'	Stadium: Toyota Field; Attendance: 7,244; Referee: Daniel Gutierrez

June 9, 2018 USL 14	Rio Grande Valley FC Toros	0–1	Portland Timbers 2	Edinburg, Texas
17:30 (PST)		Report	Phillips 14' (Barmby); Lewis (yellow card) 53'; Loría (yellow card) 78'	Stadium: H-E-B Park; Attendance: 3,995; Referee: Baltazar Peral Hana

June 13, 2018 USL 15	Portland Timbers 2	1–2	OKC Energy FC	Portland, Oregon
19:00 (PST)	Langsdorf 49' (pen.)	Report	Siaj 6' (Alhassan); Ibeagha 62' (Rasmussen) (yellow card) 90'	Stadium: Providence Park; Attendance: 4,147; Referee: Jeff Arthurholtz

June 17, 2018 USL 16	Portland Timbers 2	1–4	Colorado Springs Switchbacks FC	Portland, Oregon
14:00 (PST)	Hanson 18' (Jadama); Zambrano (yellow card) 36'; Phillips (yellow card) 49'	Report	Schweitzer (yellow card) 34'; Burt 51' (Hanlin) 55' (Hanlin); Maybin 71' (Malcolm); Ajeakwa 79' (Suggs); Hamilton (yellow card) 83'; Eboussi (yellow card) 86'	Stadium: Merlo Field; Attendance: 1,798; Referee: Chipalo Street

June 30, 2018 USL 17	Reno 1868 FC	1–0	Portland Timbers 2	Reno, Nevada
19:30 (PST)	Hoppenot (yellow card) 70'; Musovski 81' (Hoppenot)	Report		Stadium: Greater Nevada Field; Attendance: 4,603; Referee: Ismir Pekmic

July 8, 2018 USL 18	Portland Timbers 2	2–4	Fresno FC	Portland, Oregon
14:00 (PST)	Langsdorf 36' (pen.); Tuiloma (yellow card) 64'; Loría 79'	Report	Chaney 21' (Caffa); Caffa 24' (pen.) 65'; Argueta 51' (Barrera); Verhoeven (yellow card) 66'; Ellis-Hayden (yellow card) 88'	Stadium: Merlo Field; Attendance: 1,121; Referee: Alejandro Mariscal

July 14, 2018 USL 19	Portland Timbers 2	2–1	Swope Park Rangers	Portland, Oregon
19:00 (PST)	Langsdorf 23' (Loría); Loría 45+2' (Williamson); Williamson (yellow card) 60'	Report	Harris 59' (Storm); Silva (yellow card) 66'	Stadium: Merlo Field; Attendance: 1,034; Referee: Robi Hullner

July 22, 2018 USL 20	Portland Timbers 2	1–2	Las Vegas Lights FC	Portland, Oregon
14:00 (PST)	Barmby 63' (Langsdorf)	Report	Ochoa 53'; Salgado 74'; Herrera-Perla (yellow card) 90+3'	Stadium: Providence Park; Attendance: 1,947; Referee: Daniel Radford

July 28, 2018 USL 21	LA Galaxy II	3–4	Portland Timbers 2	Carson, California
13:00 (PST)	Zubak 1' (Aguilar); Dhillon 11'; Zanga (yellow card) 26'; Acheampong (yellow card) 33'; López 78' (Traore)	Report	Ebobisse 3' (Loría); Williamson 23' (Ebobisse); Langsdorf 54' (Lewis) 63' (Lewis) (yellow card) 86'; Loría (yellow card) 61'; McIntosh (yellow card) 90'	Stadium: StubHub Center; Attendance: 833; Referee: Ceciah Valero

August 1, 2018 USL 22	Orange County SC	2–2	Portland Timbers 2	Irvine, California
12:30 (PST)	Quinn 62' (Seaton); Enevoldsen 84' (Quinn)	Report	Loría 13' (Zambrano); Barmby 31' (Langsdorf)	Stadium: Championship Soccer Stadium; Attendance: 4,124; Referee: Joseph Salinas

August 5, 2018 USL 23	Portland Timbers 2	1–4	Phoenix Rising FC	Portland, Oregon
12:00 (PST)	Farfan 72'	Report	Cortez 8' (Riggi) (yellow card) 69' (goal) 82'; Fernandez 63'; Musa (yellow card) 85'; Asante 89' (Cortez); Johnson (yellow card) 90+2'	Stadium: Providence Park; Attendance: 1,536; Referee: Mike Hohnholz

August 11, 2018 USL 24	Swope Park Rangers	0–2	Portland Timbers 2	Kansas City, Kansas
17:30 (PST)	Smith (yellow card) 55'	Report	Ebobisse 7' (Loría); Barmby 55' (pen.)	Stadium: Children's Mercy Park; Attendance: 964; Referee: Daniel Gutierrez

August 15, 2018 USL 25	Portland Timbers 2	2–1	San Antonio FC	Portland, Oregon
19:30 (PST)	Diz Pe (yellow card) 27'; Smith (yellow card) 37'; Langsdorf 42' (Batista); Zambrano (yellow card) 45+5' (goal) 54' (Diz Pe); Anguiano (yellow card) 85'	Report	Gordon 28'; Lopez (yellow card) 42'; Cuomo (yellow card) 48'; Pecka (yellow card) 69'	Stadium: Providence Park; Attendance: 1,496; Referee: Chipalo Street

August 19, 2018 USL 26	Portland Timbers 2	4–1	Seattle Sounders FC 2	Portland, Oregon
19:00 (PST)	Barmby (yellow card) 1'; Langsdorf 34' 68' (Loría); Zambrano 61' (Barmby); Diz Pe 78'	Report	Brisco (yellow card) 54'; Atencia 76' (Gonzalez); Ele (yellow card) 87'	Stadium: Merlo Field; Attendance: 1,145; Referee: Bardhyl Pashaj

August 22, 2018 USL 27	Portland Timbers 2	2–3	Orange County SC	Portland, Oregon
19:00 (PST)	Conechny 44' (Langsdorf) (yellow card) 57'; Langsdorf (yellow card) 54' (goal) 79' (Zambrano)	Report	Enevoldsen 9' (Amico) 85' (Powder); Quinn (yellow card) 27'; Crognale 65'	Stadium: Merlo Field; Attendance: 1,017; Referee: Farhad Dadkho

September 1, 2018 USL 28	Portland Timbers 2	1–0	Saint Louis FC	Portland, Oregon
19:00 (PST)	Ornstil (yellow card) 44'; Diz Pe (yellow card) 68'; Zambrano (yellow card) 78'; Arboleda 90+3' (Zambrano) (yellow card) 90+4'	Report	Calistri (yellow card) 41'; Fall (yellow card) 69'	Stadium: Providence Park; Attendance: 1,441; Referee: Michael Radchuk

September 9, 2018 USL 29	Portland Timbers 2	4–0	Tulsa Roughnecks FC	Portland, Oregon
14:00 (PST)	Tuiloma 12' (Loría); Loría 24' (Farfan); Barmby (yellow card) 55'; Arboleda 84' (Asprilla)	Report		Stadium: Providence Park; Attendance: 3,445; Referee: Alejandro Mariscal

September 16, 2018 USL 30	Las Vegas Lights FC	1–2	Portland Timbers 2	Las Vegas, Nevada
20:00 (PST)	Mendiola 4' (Thomas); R. Garcia (yellow card) 45'; Ochoa (yellow card) 71'; Avila (yellow card) 71'; J. Garcia (yellow card) 79'	Report	Arboleda 72' (Diz Pe); Zambrano 84' (Langsdorf)	Stadium: Cashman Field; Attendance: 4,875; Referee: Matthew Franz

September 22, 2018 USL 31	Fresno FC	2–2	Portland Timbers 2	Fresno, California
19:00 (PST)	Brown (yellow card) 38'; Baldisimo (yellow card) 54'; Ribeiro (yellow card) 60'; Ellis-Hayden 70'; Chaney 90+5' (Smart) (yellow card) 90+5'	Report	Barmby 8' (pen.) (yellow card) 84'; Loría 11' (pen.); Zambrano (yellow card) 62'	Stadium: Chukchansi Park; Attendance: 6,103; Referee: Luis Guardia

September 29, 2018 USL 32	Sacramento Republic FC	1–0	Portland Timbers 2	Sacramento, California
19:30 (PST)	Iwasa 6' (Hord); Seiler (yellow card) 90+5'	Report	Smith (yellow card) 58' (yellow card) 74' (red card); Zambrano (yellow card) 83'; Diz Pe (yellow card) 90+7'	Stadium: Papa Murphy's Park; Attendance: 11,569; Referee: Michael Radchuk

October 3, 2018 USL 33	Portland Timbers 2	0–2	Reno 1868 FC	Portland, Oregon
19:00 (PST)	Barmby (yellow card) 22'; Hanson (yellow card) 89'	Report	Lacroix 36' (Casiple); Graf (yellow card) 69' (goal) 85' (Hoppenot)	Stadium: Merlo Field; Attendance: 1,205; Referee: Malik Badawi

October 13, 2018 USL 34	Phoenix Rising FC	0–1	Portland Timbers 2	Tempe, Arizona
19:30 (PST)	Mala (yellow card) 45+3'; Drogba (yellow card) 89'	Report	Barmby (yellow card) 34'; Williams 85' (Barmby)	Stadium: Phoenix Rising FC Soccer Complex; Attendance: 7,289; Referee: Lorant Vaga

=== Postseason ===
Win Draw Loss Upcoming fixture

October 19, 2018 Quarterfinal	Phoenix Rising FC	3–0	Portland Timbers 2	Tempe, Arizona
19:30 (PST)	Drogba 28'; J. Johnson 62' (Cortez); Asante 90'	Report	Zambrano (yellow card) 40'; Hanson (yellow card) 84'; Diz Pe (red card) 90+5'	Stadium: Phoenix Rising FC Soccer Complex; Attendance: 7,511; Referee: Rubiel Vazquez

=== Friendlies ===
Win Draw Loss Upcoming fixture

May 22, 2018	Portland Timbers 2	2–2 (4–2 p)	(Germany) FC St. Pauli	Portland, Oregon
19:30 (PST)	Flores (yellow card) 23'; Williams 72' (Langsdorf) 81'; Diz Pe (red card) 86'	Report	Allagui 4'; Diamantakos 63' (Buballa); Sobiech (yellow card) 78'; Zehir (red card) 86'	Stadium: Providence Park; Attendance: 5,774
	Penalties
	(penalty scored) Vytas; (penalty scored) Lewis; (penalty scored) Langsdorf; (penalty scored) Zambrano		(penalty scored) Diamantakos; (penalty missed) Sobiech; (penalty scored) Koglin; (penalty missed) Sobota
