= 2019 Portland Timbers 2 season =

Portland Timbers 2
2019 season
- Head coach: Cameron Knowles
- Stadium: Providence Park; Portland, Oregon (Capacity: 21,144)
- USL Championship: Conference: TBD; Overall: TBD
- USL Championship Playoffs: TBD
- Highest home attendance: 3,513 (June 16 vs. Fresno)
- Lowest home attendance: 1,116 (April 13 vs. Sacramento)
- Average home league attendance: 1,899
- Biggest win: 4–1 (May 12 at Tacoma); 6–3 (September 20 vs. Tacoma)
- Biggest defeat: 1–5 (September 14 at Real Monarchs)

The 2019 Portland Timbers 2 season was the fifth season for Portland Timbers 2 in the USL Championship, the second-tier professional soccer league in the United States and Canada.

== Club ==
As of February 25, 2019

| No. | Position | Nation | Player |
|---|---|---|---|
| 7 | MF | CRC | Roy Miller |
| 19 | FW | ARG | Tomás Conechny |
| 25 | MF | NZL | Bill Tuiloma |
| 28 | FW | USA | Foster Langsdorf |
| 29 | FW | USA | Ryan Sierakowski |
| 30 | MF | USA | Eryk Williamson |
| 32 | DF | USA | Marco Farfan |
| 40 | MF | VEN | Renzo Zambrano |
| 42 | DF | USA | Nathan Smith |
| 43 | GK | USA | Kendall McIntosh |
| 44 | FW | CRC | Marvin Loría |
| 45 | DF | USA | Harold Hanson |
| 48 | DF | USA | Max Ornstil |
| 50 | GK | USA | Jake Leeker |
| 54 | DF | USA | Niko de Vera |
| 62 | GK | USA | Hunter Sulpe |
| 63 | GK | USA | Kashope Oladapo |
| 66 | DF | USA | Carlos Anguiano |
| 77 | MF | USA | Todd Wharton |
| 80 | MF | ARG | Cristian Ojeda (on loan from Talleres) |
| 83 | DF | ENG | Maxwell Elliott |
| 84 | MF | TTO | John Paul Rochford |
| 85 | MF | USA | Nicholas Scardina |
| 86 | MF | USA | Masango Akale } |
| 87 | DF | CUB | Adrián Diz |
| 91 | FW | USA | Gio Calixtro |
| 94 | DF | GAM | Modou Jadama |
| 97 | MF | USA | Zach Kobayashi |
| 99 | FW | VEN | Brayan Hurtado (on loan from Mineros) |

Signed to first team contract with Portland Timbers.
Portland Timbers Academy player.

== Competitions ==
=== Preseason ===
Win Draw Loss Upcoming fixture

| March 1, 2019 PRE 1 | Portland Pilots | 1–3 | Portland Timbers 2 | Portland, Oregon |
| 7:00 PM (PST) | 53' | Report | Langsdorf 8'; Miller 65'; Diz 90' | Stadium: Merlo Field |

=== USL Championship ===
==== Match results ====
On December 19, 2018, the USL announced their 2019 season schedule.
All times are in Pacific time.

| March 9 1 | Tulsa Roughnecks | 1–1 | Portland Timbers 2 | Tulsa, Oklahoma |
| 5:00 PM | Altamirano 12'; Gonzalez (yellow card) 57'; Sheldon (yellow card) 71'; Hedrick (yellow card) 90+1' | Report | Jadama 55'; Hanson (yellow card) 84' | Stadium: ONEOK Field; Attendance: 3,122; Referee: Jose Lara |

| March 16 2 | San Antonio FC | 1–3 | Portland Timbers 2 | San Antonio, Texas |
| 5:30 PM | Pecka (yellow card) 14'; Barmby 28' (pen.), (yellow card) 72'; Greene (yellow card) 87' | Report | Wharton 18'; Loría 32', 78'; Williamson (yellow card) 66'; Miller (yellow card) 68'; Hurtado (yellow card) 79' | Stadium: Toyota Field; Attendance: 6,112; Referee: Michael Radchuk |

| March 23 3 | Portland Timbers 2 | 3–1 | Las Vegas Lights FC | Portland, Oregon |
| 7:00 PM | Langsdorf 10'; Asprilla 44' (pen.), 74' | Report | Hernández (yellow card) 22'; Torres (yellow card) 45+1'; Rivas (yellow card) 59'; Robinson 70' | Stadium: Providence Park; Attendance: 2,124; Referee: Farhad Dadkho |

| March 30 4 | LA Galaxy II | 3–2 | Portland Timbers 2 | Carson, California |
| 7:00 PM | Acheampong 34'; Hilliard-Arce 38', 90' | Report | Calixtro 12', 65'; Williamson (yellow card) 78'; Wharton (yellow card) 83' | Stadium: Dignity Health Sports Park; Attendance: 788; Referee: Joseph Salinas |

| April 6 5 | OKC Energy FC | 2–3 | Portland Timbers 2 | Oklahoma City, Oklahoma |
| 5:30 PM | da Fonte 22'; Cato 25'; Williams (yellow card) 55'; Ross (yellow card) 87' | Report | Diz (yellow card) 5'; Hurtado 68'; Kobayashi 79'; Sierakowski 90+1' | Stadium: Taft Stadium; Attendance: 3,396; Referee: Elton Garcia |

| April 13 6 | Portland Timbers 2 | 1–0 | Sacramento Republic FC | Portland, Oregon |
| 7:00 PM | Jadama 29' (pen.) | Report | Bijev (yellow card) 57' (yellow-red card) 63'; Chantzopoulos (yellow card) 78' (yellow-red card) 90+1'; Saari (yellow card) 84' | Stadium: Providence Park; Attendance: 1,116; Referee: Mike Hohnholz |

| April 20 7 | Portland Timbers 2 | 2–2 | Colorado Springs Switchbacks | Portland, Oregon |
| 8:00 PM | Smith (yellow card) 46'; Jadama (yellow card) 61'; Langsdorf 63', 86' | Report | Burt 18' (pen.); Hundley (yellow card) 45'; Schweitzer 84' | Stadium: Merlo Field; Attendance: 1,822; Referee: Mark Allatin |

| April 26 8 | New Mexico United | 3–3 | Portland Timbers 2 | Albuquerque, New Mexico |
| 7:30 PM | Suggs (yellow card) 34'; Frater (yellow card) 35', (goal) 50', 54' (pen.), 90+3' | Report | Ornstil (yellow card) 42'; Williamson 66', 77' (pen.); Sierakowski 68'; Wharton (yellow card) 69'; Leeker (yellow card) 85' | Stadium: Isotopes Park; Attendance: 12,921; Referee: Alejandro Aguilera, Jr. |

| April 30 9 | Portland Timbers 2 | 1–2 | Rio Grande Valley FC Toros | Portland, Oregon |
| 7:00 PM | Miller (yellow card) 19'; Farfan (yellow card) 45+1'; Jadama (yellow card) 64', (goal) 71'; Smith (yellow card) 88' | Report | W. Cabrera 9'; Small 85' | Stadium: Merlo Field; Attendance: 1,120; Referee: Farhad Dadkho |

| May 12 10 | Tacoma Defiance | 1–4 | Portland Timbers 2 | Tacoma, Washington |
| 1:30 pm (PDT) | Dhillon 42'; Hinds (yellow card) 88' | Report | Langsdorf 24'; Williamson (yellow card) 38'; Asprilla 49' (pen.), 61'; Hurtado 59' | Stadium: Cheney Stadium; Attendance: 1,927; Referee: Alejandro Mariscal |

| May 25 11 | Portland Timbers 2 | 1–1 | El Paso Locomotive FC | Portland, Oregon |
| 8:00 PM | Asprilla 41', (yellow card) 65'; Hanson (yellow card) 45+2' | Report | N'Toko (yellow card) 31'; Salgado (yellow card) 40', (goal) 45+1'; Contreras (yellow card) 52'; Kiffe (yellow card) 75'; Jérôme (yellow card) 90+1' | Stadium: Providence Park; Attendance: 3,134; Referee: Elijio Arreguin |

| May 29 12 | Portland Timbers 2 | 2–1 | Real Monarchs | Portland, Oregon |
| 7:00 PM | Asprilla 63', (yellow card) 90+2'; Jadama 70', (yellow card) 71'; Farfan (yellow card) 88'; Hanson (yellow card) 89' | Report | Kacher (yellow card) 28'; Martínez 37'; Plewa (yellow card) 59'; Heard (yellow card) 68' | Stadium: Providence Park; Attendance: 2,523; Referee: Jon Freemon |

| June 8 13 | Austin Bold FC | 2–2 | Portland Timbers 2 | Austin, Texas |
| 5:30 PM | Lima 19', (yellow card) 68'; Báez (yellow card) 19'; Tyrpak 33'; Saramutin (yellow card) 43' | Report | Ornstil (yellow card) 8'; Williamson 43'; Langsdorf (yellow card) 51'; Wharton 81'; Jadama (yellow card) 90+1'; Anguiano (yellow card) 90+4' | Stadium: Bold Stadium; Attendance: 2,815; Referee: Mark Allatin |

| June 16 14 | Portland Timbers 2 | 2–2 | Fresno FC | Portland, Oregon |
| 2:00 PM | Asprilla (yellow card) 45+3'; Wharton 47' (pen.); Langsdorf (yellow card) 72'; Smith 90+2' | Report | Martin 53'; Kurimoto (yellow card) 66'; Lawal 68'; Cochran (yellow card) 72' | Stadium: Providence Park; Attendance: 3,513; Referee: Elton Garcia |

| June 22 15 | Orange County SC | 0–2 | Portland Timbers 2 | Irvine, California |
| 9:00 PM | Vinicius (yellow card) 57' | Report | Ojeda (yellow card) 46'; Miller 87'; Hurtado 90+1' | Stadium: Championship Soccer Stadium; Attendance: 3,172; Referee: Alejandro Mariscal |

| June 26 16 | Portland Timbers 2 | 1–2 | Reno 1868 FC | Portland, Oregon |
| 7:00 PM | Hurtado 14'; Miller (yellow card) 50' | Report | Seymore (yellow card) 49'; Carroll (yellow card) 50'; Musovski 60', (yellow card) 67'; Casiple 62'; Rivas (yellow card) 87' | Stadium: Providence Park; Attendance: 1,922; Referee: Dejan Susak |

| June 29 17 | Phoenix Rising FC | 4–2 | Portland Timbers 2 | Scottsdale, Arizona |
| 7:30pm | Asante 32' (pen.), 90+7' (pen.); Dia 62', 90+4' | Report | Smith (yellow card) 32'; Ojeda 37'; Hurtado 49'; Hanson (yellow card) 52' | Stadium: Casino Arizona Field; Attendance: 6,372; Referee: Matthew Thompson |

| July 6 18 | Portland Timbers 2 | 1–1 | Tulsa Roughnecks | Portland, Oregon |
| 7:30 PM | Wharton 90+8' (pen.) | Report | Rogers (yellow card) 2' da Costa 14'; Silva (yellow card) 26'; Rezende (yellow card) 70'; Reyes (yellow card) 85' (yellow-red card) 90+1'; Mompremier (red card) 90+6' | Stadium: Providence Park; Attendance: 1,986; Referee: Marco Vega |

| July 13 19 | Sacramento Republic FC | 1–0 | Portland Timbers 2 | Sacramento, California |
| 8:00 PM | Partain 41'; Taintor (yellow card) 47' | Report | Tuiloma (yellow card) 36'; Langsdorf (yellow card) 47'; Leeker (yellow card) 66'; Smith (yellow card) 73'; Kobayashi (yellow card) 82'; Calixtro (yellow card) 86' | Stadium: Papa Murphy's Park; Attendance: 11,569; Referee: Lukasz Szpala |

| July 20 20 | Fresno FC | 2–1 | Portland Timbers 2 | Fresno, California |
| 8:30 PM | del Campo 6'; Basuljevic 19'; Johnson (yellow card) 40'; Lawal (yellow card) 44'; Cooper (yellow card) 84' | Report | Wharton (yellow card) 44'; Sierakowski 47' | Stadium: Chukchansi Park; Attendance: 3,457; Referee: Mark Allatin |

| July 28 21 | Portland Timbers 2 | 1–2 | LA Galaxy II | Portland, Oregon |
| 6:00 PM | Asprilla 32'; Williamson (yellow card) 35' | Report | Zubak 7'; Gallagher (yellow card) 20'; Ontiveros (yellow card) 76'; Harvey (yellow card) 90+1'; Hernández 90+5' | Stadium: Providence Park; Attendance: 1,874; Referee: Alejandro Aguilera |

| August 3 22 | El Paso Locomotive FC | P–P | Portland Timbers 2 | El Paso, Texas |
| 6:30 PM | | | | Stadium: Southwest University Park; Referee: Dejan Susak |
Note: Match postponed due to mass shooting event in El Paso.

| August 7 23 | Colorado Springs Switchbacks | 2–2 | Portland Timbers 2 | Colorado Springs, Colorado |
| 6:00 PM | Jome 48'; Robinson 67' | Report | Ojeda 35'; Langsdorf 69'; Sierakowski (yellow card) 82'; Smith (yellow card) 90+3' | Stadium: Weidner Field; Attendance: 4,201; Referee: Brandon Stevis |

| August 11 24 | Portland Timbers 2 | 3–2 | New Mexico United | Portland, Oregon |
| 6:00 PM | Langsdorf 3'; Williamson (yellow card) 43'; Sierakowski 58'; Wharton 74' (pen.) | Report | Padilla (yellow card) 14' (yellow-red card) 84'; Suggs (yellow card) 19'; Frater (yellow card) 66'; Moar 72'; Schmidt (yellow card) 77'; Bruce (yellow card) 90+3' | Stadium: Providence Park; Attendance: 2,316; Referee: Greg Dopka |

| August 16 25 | Portland Timbers 2 | 2–4 | OKC Energy FC | Portland, Oregon |
| 7:30 PM | Calixtro 4'; Sierakowski 28'; Ojeda (yellow card) 90+2' | Report | Eissele 20', 56'; Williams 53'; Ibeagha 86' | Stadium: Providence Park; Attendance: 1,546; Referee: Elijio Arreguin |

| August 24 26 | Las Vegas Lights FC | 1–0 | Portland Timbers 2 | Las Vegas, Nevada |
| 9:30 PM | Villareal 45' | Report | Williamson (yellow card) 52'; Smith (yellow card) 83'; Langsdorf (yellow card) 90+5' | Stadium: Cashman Field; Attendance: 7,686; Referee: Rosendo Mendoza |

| August 31 27 | Reno 1868 FC | 1–3 | Portland Timbers 2 | Reno, Nevada |
| 7:00 PM | Hertzog 82'; Galindo (yellow card) 90+3'; Hertzog (yellow card) 90+4' | Report | Ornstil (yellow card) 8'; Sierakowski 26'; Anguiano 42'; Ojeda 51'; Kiner (yellow card) 90' | Stadium: Greater Nevada Field; Attendance: 4,763; Referee: Ismir Pekmic |

| September 8 28 | Portland Timbers 2 | 1–2 | Orange County SC | Portland, Oregon |
| 7:30 PM | Calixtro 60'; Diz (yellow card) 90+1' | Report | Seaton 35', (yellow card) 89'; Jones 54'; Quinn (yellow card) 73'; Hume (yellow card) 77' | Stadium: Providence Park; Attendance: 1,914; Referee: Malik Badawi |

| September 14 29 | Real Monarchs | 5–1 | Portland Timbers 2 | Herriman, Utah |
| 8:00 PM | Martínez 22', 38', 66', 70'; Saucedo (yellow card) 80'; Coffee 83'; Moberg (yellow card) 87' | Report | Calixtro 24', (yellow card) 41'; Sierakowski (yellow card) 44'; Wharton (yellow card) 80' | Stadium: Zions Bank Stadium; Referee: Brad Jensen |

| September 20 30 | Portland Timbers 2 | 6–3 | Tacoma Defiance | Portland, Oregon |
| 7:30 pm (PDT) | Hurtado 3'; Asprilla 22', 48' (pen.), (yellow card) 58'; Sierakowski 40'; Williamson 45'; Anguiano 83' | Report | Roldan 42'; Daley (yellow card) 44'; Dhillon (yellow card) 53', (goal) 53'; Ocampo-Chavez 90+1' | Stadium: Providence Park; Attendance: 1,504; Referee: Matthew Thompson |

| September 29 31 | Portland Timbers 2 | 1–2 | Austin Bold FC | Portland, Oregon |
| 3:00 PM | Hanson 25'; Diz (yellow card) 27'; Smith (yellow card) 65' | Report | Tyrpak 64'; Lima (yellow card) 82', (goal) 84'; Báez (yellow card) 90+2' | Stadium: Providence Park; Attendance: 1,357; Referee: Eric Tattersall |

| October 5 32 | Portland Timbers 2 | 3–5 | Phoenix Rising FC | Portland, Oregon |
| 7:00 PM | Calixtro 24'; Anguiano (yellow card) 31'; Ojeda (yellow card) 31'; Diz (yellow card) 45+4' (red card) 66'; Hurtado 73'; Ledbetter 76' (o.g.); Wharton (yellow card) 86'; Ornstil (yellow card) 86' | Report | Lambert 4', (yellow card) 38'; Spencer 35', 70'; Flemmings 54'; Mala (yellow card) 82'; Aguinaga 88' | Stadium: Providence Park; Attendance: 1,213; Referee: Luis Guardia |

| October 11 33 | Portland Timbers 2 | 3–4 | San Antonio FC | Portland, Oregon |
| 7:00 PM | Williamson (yellow card) 22'; Ojeda 25'; Ornstil (yellow card) 73'; Wharton (yellow card) 77'; Calixtro 86'; Sierakowski 90+2' | Report | Guzmán 6', 12', 67'; Gómez 39'; Hernández (yellow card) 88' | Stadium: Providence Park; Attendance: 1,305; Referee: Matthew Franz |

| October 15 22 | El Paso Locomotive FC | 4–1 | Portland Timbers 2 | El Paso, Texas |
| 6:30 PM | Velásquez 4'; Monsalvez (yellow card) 12'; Ross 24'; Gómez 68', 79' | Report | Kobayashi 25'; Durán (yellow card) 78'; Diz (yellow card) 83'; Calixtro (yellow card) 88' | Stadium: Southwest University Park; Attendance: 6,175; Referee: Sergii Demianchuk |
Note: Reschedule of postponed August 3 match.

| October 18 34 | Rio Grande Valley FC Toros | 2–1 | Portland Timbers 2 | Edinburg, Texas |
| 7:30 PM | Beckford 15'; Small 43' | Report | Hurtado (yellow card) 17'; Wharton 19'; Ornstil (yellow card) 34'; Hanson (yellow card) 48'; Diz (yellow card) 90+3' | Stadium: H-E-B Park; Attendance: 4,967; Referee: Lukasz Szpala |

==== Standings ====
| Pos | Team | Pld | W | D | L | GF | GA | GD | Pts |
|---|---|---|---|---|---|---|---|---|---|
| 12 | Rio Grande Valley Toros | 34 | 11 | 8 | 15 | 50 | 58 | −8 | 41 |
| 13 | Las Vegas Lights FC | 34 | 11 | 8 | 15 | 46 | 56 | −10 | 41 |
| 14 | Portland Timbers 2 | 34 | 10 | 8 | 16 | 65 | 71 | −6 | 38 |
| 15 | OKC Energy FC | 34 | 9 | 11 | 14 | 45 | 58 | −13 | 38 |
| 16 | Tulsa Roughnecks | 34 | 8 | 10 | 16 | 45 | 69 | −24 | 34 |

Source: USL Championship Standings
Rules for classification: 1) total wins; 2) total goal differential; 3) total goals scored; 4) points earned against top four Conference finishers; 5) disciplinary points; 6) coin toss or drawing of lots

==== Results summary ====
Source: Match reports

| Round | 1 | 2 | 3 | 4 | 5 | 6 | 7 | 8 | 9 | 10 | 11 | 12 | 13 | 14 | 15 | 16 | 17 | 18 | 19 | 20 | 21 | 22 |
|---|---|---|---|---|---|---|---|---|---|---|---|---|---|---|---|---|---|---|---|---|---|---|
| Stadium | A | A | H | A | A | H | H | A | H | A | H | H | A | H | A | H | A | H | A | A | H | A |
| Result | D | W | W | L | W | W | D | D | L | W | D | W | D | D | W | L | W | D | L | W | L | P |

Updated to match(es) played on August 3, 2019. Source: Results Table
A = Away; H = Home; W = Win; D = Draw; L = Loss; P = Postponed

=== U.S. Open Cup ===
Due to their ownership by a more advanced level professional club, Portland Timbers 2 is one of 13 teams expressly forbidden from entering the Cup competition.
