= 2018 Rio Grande Valley FC season =

Rio Grande Valley FC Toros
2018 season
- Head coach: Gerson Echeverry
- United Soccer League: Conference: 13th Overall: 25th
- Highest home attendance: 7,846 (May 12 vs. San Antonio FC)
- Lowest home attendance: 3,058 (September 5 vs. Real Monarchs)
- Average home league attendance: 4,650
- Biggest win: 3 goals: RGVFC 3–0 Seattle Sounders FC 2 (September 22)
- Biggest defeat: 4 goals: Reno 1868 FC 4–0 RGVFC (September 26)
Home colours	Away colours	Third colours

The 2018 Rio Grande Valley FC Toros season was the 3rd season for Rio Grande Valley FC Toros in the United Soccer League (USL), the second-tier professional soccer league in the United States and Canada.

== Club ==
Note: Flags indicate national team as defined under FIFA eligibility rules; some limited exceptions apply. Players may hold more than one non-FIFA nationality. Squad correct as of March 16, 2018.

No.	Pos.	Nation	Player
0	GK	BEL	Nico Corti
1	GK	PUR	Matt Sanchez
2	DF	USA	Kai Greene
3	MF	USA	Luis Gil
4	DF	USA	Robert Castellanos
5	DF	USA	Manny Padilla
6	MF	JAM	Jorginho James (on loan from Harbour View)
7	MF	ARG	Matías Zaldívar
8	MF	COL	Nicolás Perea
10	MF	GUA	Pablo Aguilar
11	FW	USA	Jesús Enríquez
13	MF	COL	David Cabrera
14	MF	USA	Todd Wharton
15	MF	USA	Bryce Marion
18	FW	USA	Zach Wright
19	FW	USA	Mac Steeves
20	DF	USA	Conor Donovan
21	DF	USA	A. J. DeLaGarza
22	FW	USA	Jordan Jones
23	FW	MEX	Aldo Quintanilla
24	DF	USA	Derek Luke
26	GK	USA	Michael Nelson
27	DF	SWE	Adam Lundqvist
28	FW	COL	Wilmer Cabrera Jr.
30	DF	USA	Omar Ontiveros
31	DF	USA	Sheldon Sullivan
32	DF	NZL	Kyle Adams
33	DF	USA	Jared Watts
34	GK	USA	Tyler Deric
36	MF	USA	Andrew Wenger
53	MF	USA	Eric Bird
58	FW	PAN	Carlos Small (on loan from Árabe Unido)
90	MF	NGA	Monday Etim
—	MF	USA	Brandon Morales

Signed to first team contract with MLS affiliate Houston Dynamo.
Houston Dynamo academy player.

== Competitions ==
=== Preseason ===
February 3	Rio Grande Valley FC Toros	1–9	Houston Dynamo	Edinburg, Texas
				Stadium: H-E-B Park

February 22	Rio Grande Valley FC Toros	0–0	Houston Baptist University	Edinburg, Texas
				Stadium: H-E-B Park

February 24	Rio Grande Valley FC Toros	2–5	Motagua FC	Edinburg, Texas
				Stadium: H-E-B Park

March 2	San Antonio FC	0–0	Rio Grande Valley FC Toros	San Antonio, Texas
7:30 PM CST	King (yellow card) 24'; Lopez (yellow card) 34'	Report		Stadium: Toyota Field

=== United Soccer League ===
==== Standings ====
Pos	Team	Pld	W	D	L	GF	GA	GD	Pts
11	Colorado Springs Switchbacks	34	11	6	17	36	39	−3	39
12	Fresno FC	34	9	12	13	44	38	+6	39
13	Rio Grande Valley Toros	34	8	14	12	36	42	−6	38
14	LA Galaxy II	34	10	7	17	60	67	−7	37
15	Las Vegas Lights FC	34	8	7	19	50	74	−24	31

Source: 2018 USL standings
Rules for classification: 1) total wins; 2) total goal differential; 3) total goals scored; 4) points earned against top four Conference finishers; 5) disciplinary points; 6) coin toss or drawing of lots

==== Match results ====
Win Draw Loss Upcoming fixture

Unless otherwise noted, all times in CDT

March 16 1	Rio Grande Valley FC Toros	1–1	Saint Louis FC	Edinburg, Texas
7:30 P.M.	Donovan (yellow card) 52'; Aguilar (yellow card) 66', (goal) 77'	Report	Hilton (yellow card) 26'; Fall (yellow card) 56'; Walls 82'	Stadium: H-E-B Park; Attendance: 5,910; Referee: Christopher Scruggs

March 31 2	Rio Grande Valley FC Toros	2–2	Sacramento Republic FC	Edinburg, Texas
5:30 P.M.	Ontiveros (yellow card) 43'; Wharton 51' (pen.); James (yellow card) 74', (goal) 79'	Report	Bijev 30'; Iwasa (yellow card) 35', (goal) 80'; Donovan 90+2' (o.g.)	Stadium: H-E-B Park; Attendance: 5,903; Referee: Marco Vega

April 7 3	Colorado Springs Switchbacks FC	2–1	Rio Grande Valley FC Toros	Colorado Springs, Colorado
7:00 P.M.	Suggs 63'; Burt 70' (pen.); Kim (yellow card) 90+3'	Report	Quintailla 80'; Ontiveros (yellow card) 83'	Stadium: Weidner Field; Attendance: 2,632; Referee: L. Szpala

April 14 4	Seattle Sounders FC 2	3–2	Rio Grande Valley FC Toros	Tacoma, Washington
7:00 P.M.	Chenkam 1', 66'; Rogers (yellow card) 50'; Gonzalez 82'	Report	Luke (yellow card) 9'; Zaldívar 22'; Wharton (yellow card) 32'; Delgado 45'+1'	Stadium: Cheney Stadium; Attendance: 2,798; Referee: Levi Rippy

April 18 5	Portland Timbers 2	3–2	Rio Grande Valley FC Toros	Portland, Oregon
9:00 P.M.	Ebobisse 56'; Barmby 61' (PK); Langsdorf 68' (Lowe); Barmby (yellow card) 76'; Batista (yellow card) 90+2' (red card)	Report	Ontiveros 30' (Donovan); Padilla (yellow card) 33'; Etim (yellow card) 45+2'; Wharton 81' (PK); Zaldívar (yellow card) 90+4' (red card)	Stadium: Merlo Field; Attendance: 1,748; Referee: Ismir Pekmic

April 25 6	Rio Grande Valley FC Toros	2–0	Orange County SC	Edinburg, Texas
7:00 P.M.	Rodríguez 36'; Ontiveros (yellow card) 40'; Aguilar (yellow card) 47'; Quintanilla 89'	Report	Amico (yellow card) 82'; Segbers (yellow card) 88'	Stadium: H-E-B Park; Attendance: 4,145; Referee: Mark Allatin

May 2 7	Rio Grande Valley FC Toros	0–0	Reno 1868 FC	Edinburg, Texas
	Ontiveros (yellow card) 24'	Report	Mfeka (yellow card) 61'	Stadium: H-E-B Park; Attendance: 4,483; Referee: Alejandro Mariscal

May 9 8	Fresno FC	2–2	Rio Grande Valley FC Toros	Fresno, California
7:30 P.M.	Fewo (yellow card) 14'; Donovan 30' (o.g.); Fiddes (yellow card) 43'; Del Campo (yellow card) 60'; Cooper 61'; Argueta (yellow card) 87'	Report	Enríquez 52'; Quintanilla 73'	Stadium: Chukchansi Park; Attendance: 4,568; Referee: Joseph Dickerson

May 12 9	Rio Grande Valley FC Toros	0–0	San Antonio FC	Edinburg, Texas
7:30 P.M.	Zaldívar (yellow card) 62'; Wharton (yellow card) 78'	Report	Felix (yellow card) 37'; Castillo (yellow card) 59'; Guadarrama (yellow card) 60'; Escalante (yellow card) 82'; King (yellow card) 89'	Stadium: H-E-B Park; Attendance: 7,846; Referee: Farhad Dadkho

May 19 10	Rio Grande Valley FC Toros	0–0	Swope Park Rangers	Edinburg, Texas
7:30 P.M.		Report	Rebellón (yellow card) 18'; Hernandez (yellow card) 86'	Stadium: H-E-B Park; Attendance: 4,102; Referee: Rosendo Mendoza

May 23 11	Rio Grande Valley FC Toros	1–1	LA Galaxy II	Edinburg, Texas
7:00 P.M>	Quintanilla 14'; Zaldívar (yellow card) 65'; Enríquez (yellow card) 69'; Wharton (yellow card) 72'; Montaño (yellow card) 90+1'	Report	Büscher (yellow card) 5'; Requejo (yellow card) 21'; F. López 87'	Stadium: H-E-B Park; Attendance: 4,794; Referee: Malik Badawi

June 4 12	Real Monarchs	2–0	Rio Grande Valley FC Toros	Herriman, Utah
7:00 P.M.	Ledezma 25'; Moberg (yellow card) 45'; Kacher (yellow card) 48', (goal) 70'	Report	Enríquez (yellow card) 31'; James (yellow card) 49'; Sullivan (yellow card) 79'	Stadium: Zions Bank Stadium; Attendance: 1,654

June 9 13	Rio Grande Valley FC Toros	0–1	Portland Timbers 2	Edinburg, Texas
7:30 P.M.		Report	Phillips 14'; Lewis (yellow card) 53'; Loría (yellow card) 78'	Stadium: H-E-B Park; Attendance: 3,995; Referee: Baltazar Peral Hana

June 16 14	OKC Energy FC	3–1	Rio Grande Valley FC Toros	Oklahoma City, Oklahoma
7:30 P.M.	Beckie (yellow card) 10'; Siaj 21'; Ross 53'; González 90+7'	Report	Ontiveros (yellow card) 5', (goal) 15'; Delgado (yellow card) 69'	Stadium: Taft Stadium; Attendance: 3,903; Referee: Marcos de Oliveira

June 23 15	Rio Grande Valley FC Toros	0–0	Phoenix Rising FC	Edinburg, Texas
7:30 P.M.	Padilla (yellow card) 34'	Report	Musa (yellow card) 47'	Stadium: H-E-B Park; Attendance: 5,649; Referee: Ramy Touchan

June 30 16	Saint Louis FC	0–0	Rio Grande Valley FC Toros	Fenton, Missouri
7:30 P.M.	Fink (yellow card) 40'; Reynolds (yellow card) 47'; Culbertson (yellow card) 73'; Hilton (yellow card) 90+4'	Report	Greene (yellow card) 45'; Padilla (yellow card) 85'	Stadium: Toyota Stadium; Attendance: 4,284; Referee: Lukasz Szpala

July 7 17	Rio Grande Valley FC Toros	1–1	Tulsa Roughnecks FC	Edinburg, Texas
7:30 P.M.	Enríquez 75'; Sullivan (yellow card) 83'	Report	Ferreira (yellow card) 74'; Gee 77'; Pirez (yellow card) 86'	Stadium: H-E-B Park; Attendance: 3,098; Referee: Elton García

July 14 18	Rio Grande Valley FC Toros	2–0	Las Vegas Lights FC	Edinburg, Texas
7:30 P.M.	Greene (yellow card) 35'; Donovan 45'; Enríquez 90'	Report	Pérez (yellow card) 14'; Salgado (yellow card) 35'; Jaime (yellow card) 38'; Alatorre (yellow card) 90+4'	Stadium: H-E-B Park; Attendance: 4,078; Referee: Rosendo Mendoza

July 22 19	Swope Park Rangers	0–0	Rio Grande Valley FC Toros	Kansas City, Kansas
4:00 P.M.		Report		Stadium: Children's Mercy Park; Attendance: 933; Referee: Ramy Touchan

July 28 20	Rio Grande Valley FC Toros	1–0	Colorado Springs Switchbacks FC	Edinburg, Texas
7:30 P.M.	Greene (yellow card) 46'; Perea (yellow card) 52'; Aguilar 83'	Report		Stadium: H-E-B Park; Attendance: 4,896; Referee: Arturo Ibarra

August 4 21	Las Vegas Lights FC	1–0	Rio Grande Valley FC Toros	Las Vegas, Nevada
10:00 P.M.	Huiqui (yellow card) 41', (goal) 82'; Ochoa (yellow card) 90+2'	Report		Stadium: Cashman Field; Attendance: 6,752; Referee: Michael Zapata

August 11 22	Sacramento Republic FC	2–1	Rio Grande Valley FC Toros	Sacramento, California
10:00 P.M.	Iwasa 61'; Alemán (yellow card) 64'; Hall 68'; Matjašič (yellow card) 78'; Bijev (yellow card) 80'	Report	Small 1'; Wharton (yellow card) 83'	Stadium: Papa Murphy's Park; Attendance: 10,937; Referee: Farhad Dadkho

August 18 23	Rio Grande Valley FC Toros	2–4	OKC Energy FC	Edinburg, Texas
7:30 PM CDT	Zaldívar 45+5'; Greene (yellow card) 62'; Wharton 79' (pen.)	Report	Volesky 34,55'; Dixon 36'; Jahn 67'; Barril (yellow card) 69'; Beckie (yellow card) 85'	Stadium: H-E-B Park; Attendance: 4,177; Referee: Sergii Demianchuk

August 22 24	LA Galaxy II	1–1	Rio Grande Valley FC Toros	Carson, California
19:30	Engola (yellow card) 18'; Aguilar (yellow card) 28'; Dhillon 77'	Report	Sullivan (yellow card) 38'; Enríquez 51'	Stadium: StubHub Center; Attendance: 478; Referee: Alejandro Mariscal

August 25 25	Orange County SC	0–2	Rio Grande Valley FC Toros	Irvine, California
9:00 PM	Hooiveld (yellow card) 57'	Report	Zaldívar 30'; Small 45+2'; Wharton (yellow card) 90'	Stadium: Championship Soccer Stadium; Attendance: 2,958; Referee: Elton Garcia

August 29 26	Rio Grande Valley FC Toros	1–3	San Antonio FC	Edinburg, Texas
7:00 p.m. CDT	Enríquez 3'	Report	Presley 49'; Laing 62'; Guzmán 81'; Lopez (yellow card) 90'	Stadium: H-E-B Park; Attendance: 3,958; Referee: Rubiel Vazquez

September 5 27	Phoenix Rising FC	1–0	Rio Grande Valley FC Toros	Scottsdale, Arizona
9:30 P.M.	Asante 61'	Report	Greene (yellow card) 12'	Stadium: Phoenix Rising FC Soccer Complex; Attendance: 5,307; Referee: Jon Freemon

September 5 28	Rio Grande Valley FC Toros	2–1	Real Monarchs	Edinburg, Texas
8:30 P.M.	Padilla (yellow card) 45'; Quintailla 71'; Wharton 77'	Report	Plewa 26'; Portillo (yellow card) 76'	Stadium: H-E-B Park; Attendance: 3,058; Referee: Luis Guardia

September 15 29	Colorado Springs Switchbacks FC	1–1	Rio Grande Valley FC Toros	Colorado Springs, Colorado
7:00 P.M.	Robinson 8'; També (yellow card) 35'	Report	Perea 71'	Stadium: Weidner Field; Attendance: 4,064; Referee: Adam Zarrin

September 22 30	Rio Grande Valley FC Toros	3–0	Seattle Sounders FC 2	Edinburg, Texas
7:30 P.M.	Wharton 5'; Bird 41'; Perea 76'	Report	Gonzalez (yellow card) 32'	Stadium: H-E-B Park; Attendance: 4,468; Referee: Elijio Arreguin

September 26 31	Reno 1868 FC	4–0	Rio Grande Valley FC Toros	Reno, Nevada
9:00 PM	Casiple 12'; Wehan 22'; Brown 80'; Thiaw 89'	Report	James (yellow card) 4'; Padilla (yellow card) 23'	Stadium: Greater Nevada Field; Attendance: 5,095; Referee: Timothy Ford

September 29 32	Rio Grande Valley FC Toros	2–1	Fresno FC	Edinburg, Texas
7:30 P.M.	Enríquez 9'; Small 84'	Report	Cazarez 14'; Strong (yellow card) 26'; Johnson (yellow card) 43'	Stadium: H-E-B Park; Attendance: 4,489; Referee: Daniel Gutierrez

October 6 33	Tulsa Roughnecks FC	1–2	Rio Grande Valley FC Toros	Tulsa, Oklahoma
7:00 P.M.	Rivas 60'; Vukovic (yellow card) 85'	Report	Perea 51'; Small 53'	Stadium: ONEOK Field; Attendance: 2,766; Referee: Danielle Chesky

October 13 34	San Antonio FC	1–1	Rio Grande Valley FC Toros	San Antonio, Texas
7:30 P.M.	Guzmán 24', (yellow card) 90+4'; King (yellow card) 68'	Report	Sullivan (yellow card) 12'; Aguilar (yellow card) 20'; Enríquez (yellow card) 43'; Small 51', (yellow card) 58'; Wharton (yellow card) 90+4'	Stadium: Toyota Field; Attendance: 7,018; Referee: Alejandro Mariscal
