= Cristian Ojeda =

Cristian Ojeda may refer to:

- Cristian Ojeda (footballer, born 1985), Colombian midfielder for Real Cartagena
- Cristian Ojeda (footballer, born 1999), Argentine midfielder for Talleres de Córdoba
