= Renzo Zambrano =

Venezuelan footballer (born 1994)

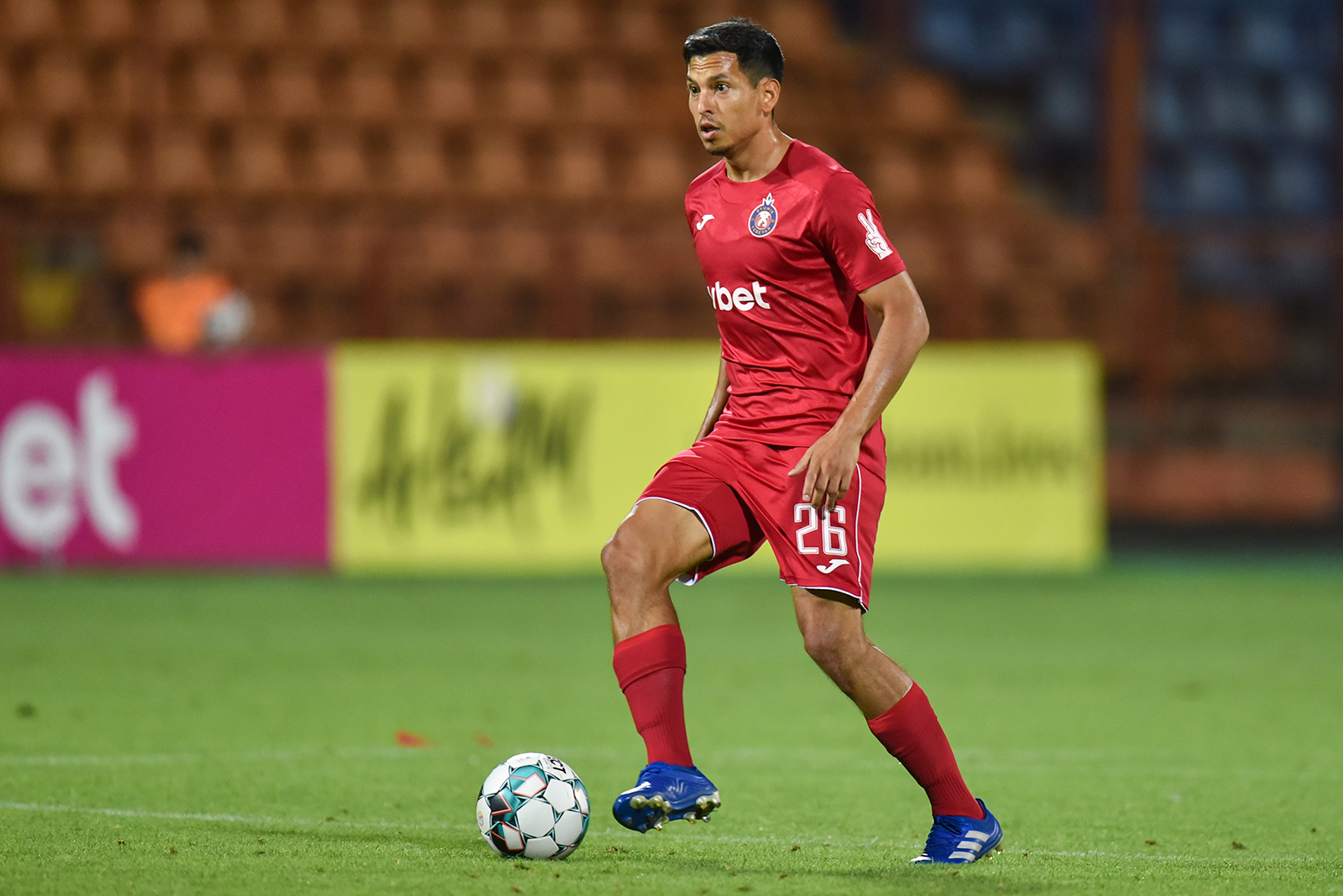

Personal information
- Full name: Renzo José Zambrano
- Date of birth: 26 August 1994 (age 32)
- Place of birth: Aragua de Maturín, Venezuela
- Height: 1.74 m (5 ft 9 in)
- Position: Defensive midfielder

Youth career
- Monagas

Senior career*
Years	Team	Apps	(Gls)
2011–2014	Monagas	61	(0)
2014–2015	Deportivo Lara	26	(1)
2015–2017	Valladolid B	54	(2)
2016–2017	Valladolid	2	(0)
2017–2020	Portland Timbers 2	46	(3)
2019–2021	Portland Timbers	29	(0)
2022	Pyunik	21	(1)
2023–2024	Phoenix Rising	70	(0)

International career^{‡}
2011	Venezuela U17	4	(0)
2013	Venezuela U20	3	(0)
2016–	Venezuela	5	(0)
- * Club domestic league appearances and goals as of 16 November 2024 ‡ National team caps and goals as of 19 November 2019

Renzo José Zambrano (born 26 August 1994) is a Venezuelan footballer as a midfielder.

== Club career ==
Born in Aragua de Maturín, Zambrano graduated with Monagas SC's youth setup. On 14 August 2011, aged just 16, he made his professional debut, coming on as a half-time substitute in a 2–0 away win against Aragua FC for the Primera División championship.

Zambrano appeared regularly during his first two seasons at the club, but was demoted to the reserves in his third. On 24 June 2014 he moved to Deportivo Lara, also in the top division.

On 8 March 2015 Zambrano scored his first professional goal, netting the second in a 2–1 win at Caracas FC. On 13 July he signed a two-year deal with Real Valladolid, initially assigned to the B-team.

Zambrano made his first team debut for the Pucelanos on 21 August 2016, starting in a 1–0 Segunda División home win against Real Oviedo.

On 22 August 2017, Zambrano signed for United Soccer League side Portland Timbers 2.

Zambrano signed with the Portland Timbers first team for the 2019 season.

On 5 February 2022, Zambrano signed for Armenian Premier League club Pyunik.

Zambrano signed with Phoenix Rising FC on December 1, 2022.

== International career ==
After representing Venezuela at under-17 and under-20 levels, Zambrano was called up to the main side on 2 November 2016 for two 2018 FIFA World Cup qualifying matches against Bolivia and Ecuador. He made his full international debut eight days later, starting in a 5–0 routing of the former.

== Career statistics ==
=== Club ===
As of match played 31 October 2022

Appearances and goals by club, season and competition
Club	Season	League			National cup		Continental		Other		Total	
Club	Season	Division	Apps	Goals	Apps	Goals	Apps	Goals	Apps	Goals	Apps	Goals
Real Valladolid	2015–16	Segunda División	0	0	0	0	-		-		0	0
Real Valladolid	2016–17	Segunda División	2	0	1	0	-		-		3	0
Real Valladolid	Total		2	0	1	0	-	-	-	-	3	0
Real Valladolid B	2015–16	Segunda División B	34	2	-		-		-		34	2
Real Valladolid B	2016–17	Segunda División B	20	0	-		-		-		20	0
Real Valladolid B	Total		54	2	-	-	-	-	-	-	54	2
Portland Timbers	2018	Major League Soccer	0	0	1	0	-		-		1	0
Portland Timbers	2019	Major League Soccer	10	0	1	0	0	0	-		11	0
Portland Timbers	2020	Major League Soccer	5	0	2	0	0	0	-		7	0
Portland Timbers	2021	Major League Soccer	14	0	0	0	1	0	-		15	0
Portland Timbers	Total		29	0	4	0	2	0	-	-	35	0
Portland Timbers 2	2018	USL Championship	7	0	-		-		-		7	0
Portland Timbers 2	2018	USL Championship	32	3	-		-		-		32	3
Portland Timbers 2	2019	USL Championship	8	0	-		-		-		8	0
Portland Timbers 2	2020	USL Championship	0	0	-		-		-		0	0
Portland Timbers 2	2021	USL Championship	0	0	-		-		-		0	0
Portland Timbers 2	Total		47	3	-	-	-	-	-	-	47	3
Pyunik	2021–22	Armenian Premier League	16	0	0	0	5	0	-		21	0
Pyunik	2022–23	Armenian Premier League	5	1	0	0	2	0	-		7	1
Pyunik	Total		21	1	0	0	7	0	-	-	28	1
Career total			153	6	5	0	9	0	-	-	167	6

== Honours ==
=== Club ===
Pyunik

- Armenian Premier League: 2021–22

Portland Timbers

- MLS is Back Tournament: 2020
