= Cristian Ojeda (footballer, born 1985) =

Colombian footballer

Personal information
- Full name: Cristian Camilo Ojeda Rubio
- Date of birth: 5 June 1985 (age 41)
- Place of birth: Montería, Colombia
- Height: 1.79 m (5 ft 10 1/2 in)
- Position: Midfielder

Senior career*
Years	Team	Apps	(Gls)
2011–2012	Valledupar	52	(3)
2012–2013	Real Cartagena	31	(0)
2015	Cortuluá	0	(0)
2015	Llaneros	5	(0)
- * Club domestic league appearances and goals as of 16:09, 12 May 2018 (UTC)

Cristian Camilo Ojeda Rubio (born 5 June 1985) is a Colombian former professional footballer who played as a midfielder.

== Career ==
Ojeda joined Valledupar in 2011, subsequently making his debut on 30 January in a Categoría Primera B defeat to Atlético Bucaramanga - he was sent off with nine minutes remaining. Ojeda's first goal for the club came in the following September against Atlético. In total, Ojeda played seventy times and scored five goals for Valledupar in all competitions. On 30 June 2012, Categoría Primera A side Real Cartagena signed Ojeda. A month later, his professional bow arrived during a match with Once Caldas. He featured in seven fixtures in 2012 which ended with relegation. In 2015, Ojeda agreed to play for Cortuluá.

However, he departed Cortuluá months later after just one appearance - in a Copa Colombia win versus Deportivo Cali on 18 February 2015. He had a short spell with Categoría Primera B's Llaneros to end 2015.

== Personal life ==
Upon retiring, Ojeda teamed up with fellow former footballers Alonso Acosta and Diego Carmona to teach and develop younger players in and around Montería, Colombia.

== Career statistics ==
Club statistics
Club	Season	League			Cup		League Cup		Continental		Other		Total	
Club	Season	Division	Apps	Goals	Apps	Goals	Apps	Goals	Apps	Goals	Apps	Goals	Apps	Goals
Valledupar	2011	Categoría Primera B	36	2	13	2	—		—		0	0	49	4
Valledupar	2012	Categoría Primera B	16	1	5	0	—		—		0	0	21	1
Valledupar	Total		52	3	18	2	—		—		0	0	70	5
Real Cartagena	2012	Categoría Primera A	7	0	0	0	—		—		0	0	7	0
Real Cartagena	2013	Categoría Primera B	24	0	7	2	—		—		0	0	31	2
Real Cartagena	Total		31	0	7	2	—		—		0	0	38	2
Cortuluá	2015	Categoría Primera B	0	0	1	0	—		—		0	0	1	0
Llaneros	2015	Categoría Primera B	5	0	0	0	—		—		0	0	5	0
Career total			88	3	26	4	—		—		0	0	114	7
