= Conor Donovan (soccer) =

American soccer player

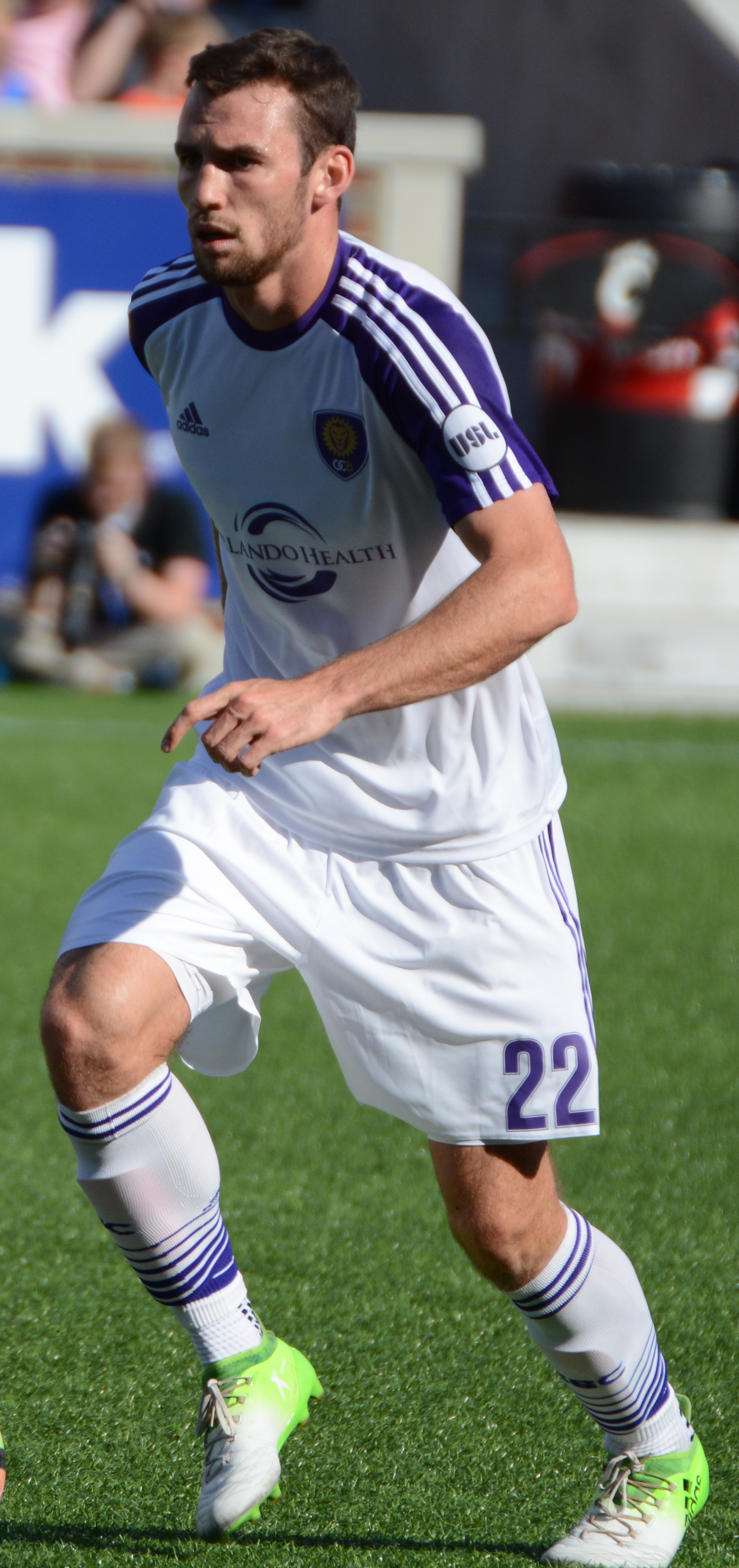
- Donovan with Orlando City B in 2017

Personal information
- Date of birth: January 8, 1996 (age 30)
- Place of birth: Fuquay-Varina, North Carolina, U.S.
- Height: 6 ft 2 in (1.88 m)
- Position: Defender

Youth career
- 2011–2013: U.S. Soccer Residency
- 2013–2014: Capital Area RailHawks

College career
Years	Team	Apps	(Gls)
2014	NC State Wolfpack	15	(1)

Senior career*
Years	Team	Apps	(Gls)
2015–2017	Orlando City	2	(0)
2015	→ Pittsburgh Riverhounds (loan)	1	(0)
2016–2017	→ Orlando City B (loan)	35	(1)
2018	Rio Grande Valley FC	10	(0)
2018	Houston Dynamo	1	(0)
2018	→ Rio Grande Valley FC (loan)	17	(1)
2019	Rio Grande Valley FC	20	(1)
2020	North Carolina FC	14	(1)
2021	OKC Energy	32	(2)
2022–2024	Sacramento Republic	121	(3)
2025	North Carolina FC	26	(1)

International career^{‡}
2011–2013	United States U17	29	(2)
2014–2015	United States U20	10	(1)
- * Club domestic league appearances and goals as of October 26, 2025 ‡ National team caps and goals as of June 5, 2015

Conor Donovan (born January 8, 1996) is an American professional soccer player who plays as a defender.

== Early life and career ==
Born on January 8, 1996, Donovan began his soccer career playing for Cardinal Gibbons High School in Raleigh, North Carolina.

=== College ===
As a freshman, Donovan made 15 appearances for the NC State Wolfpack during the 2014 season, recording one goal and one assist.

== Club career ==
Donovan was selected 22nd overall in the 2015 MLS SuperDraft. Donovan signed a Generation Adidas contract. He made his professional debut on June 17, 2015, in a Lamar Hunt U.S. Open Cup match against the Charleston Battery. Orlando went on to advance after winning 8–7 on penalties. On August 8, 2015, Donovan made his MLS debut against the Philadelphia Union; he tore the anterior cruciate ligament in his left knee in the 10th minute.

Donovan signed with the Rio Grande Valley FC Toros of the USL for 2018. On May 31, 2018, Donovan signed with RGVFC's MLS affiliate the Houston Dynamo. He started for the Dynamo in a 5-0 US Open Cup match win against NTX Reyados before being loaned back to RGVFC. On November 27, 2018, Houston declined Donovan's contract option.

Donovan returned to Rio Grande Valley for the 2019 season.

Following his release from Rio Grande Valley FC, Donovan returned to his home state and joined North Carolina FC of the USL Championship.

On January 12, 2021, Donovan moved to USL Championship side OKC Energy.

Donovan moved to Sacramento Republic on January 6, 2022, following OKC Energy's decision to go on a season-long hiatus. He finished all league first team and 3rd in defender of the year voting in the 2023 season.

== International career ==
Donovan was called up to the United States U17 team for the 2013 CONCACAF U-17 Championship.

Donovan was called up to the United States U20 team for the 2015 CONCACAF U-20 Championship and the 2015 FIFA U-20 World Cup.

== Personal ==
His sister, Caitlin Donovan, played college soccer for the Charlotte 49ers. He is of Irish and Italian descent.

== Career statistics ==
As of matches played on January 8, 2021.

Club	Season	League			Playoffs		Cup		Total	
Club	Season	League	Apps	Goals	Apps	Goals	Apps	Goals	Apps	Goals
Orlando City	2015	MLS	1	0	—		1	0	2	0
Pittsburgh Riverhounds (loan)	2015	USL	1	0	0	0	—		1	0
Orlando City B (loan)	2016	USL	15	1	—		—		15	1
Orlando City B (loan)	2017	USL	20	0	—		—		20	0
Orlando City B (loan)	OCB Totals		35	1	0	0	0	0	35	1
Rio Grande Valley	2018	USL	10	0	—		—		10	0
Houston Dynamo	2018	MLS	0	0	—		1	0	1	0
Rio Grande Valley (loan)	2018	USL	17	1	—		—		17	1
Rio Grande Valley	2019	USLC	20	1	—		—		20	1
Rio Grande Valley	RGVFC Totals		47	2	0	0	0	0	47	2
North Carolina FC	2020	USLC	14	1	—		—		14	1
Career totals			98	4	0	0	2	0	100	4

== Honors ==
Houston Dynamo

- US Open Cup: 2018
