= Javi Pérez (footballer, born 1996) =

Spanish footballer

Personal information
- Full name: Javier Pérez de Lucía Burgos
- Date of birth: March 29, 1996 (age 30)
- Place of birth: Valencia, Spain
- Height: 1.74 m (5 ft 9 in)
- Position: Midfielder

Youth career
- 2001–2016: Valencia

College career
Years	Team	Apps	(Gls)
2017–2018	Pittsburgh Panthers	35	(6)

Senior career*
Years	Team	Apps	(Gls)
2015–2016	Valencia	0	(0)
2015–2016	→ Hospitalet (loan)	9	(0)
2016	→ Alzira (loan)	10	(0)
2016–2017	Buñol	17	(2)
2019	Los Angeles FC	1	(0)
2019	→ Phoenix Rising (loan)	3	(0)
- * Club domestic league appearances and goals as of 00:06, 4 May 2019 (UTC)

Javier "Javi" Pérez de Lucía Burgos (born 29 March 1996) is a Spanish footballer who most recently played for Los Angeles FC in Major League Soccer.

== Career ==
=== Youth & college ===
Pérez joined Valencia aged five-years old and played at youth levels through the club for 15 years. He spent time on loan with lower league sides Hospitalet and UD Alzira, before been released by Valencia and spending a short spell with CD Buñol.

Pérez later moved to the United States to study and play college soccer at the University of Pittsburgh between 2017 and 2018.

=== Professional ===
On 14 January 2019, Pérez was selected 64th overall in the 2019 MLS SuperDraft by Los Angeles FC. He signed with Los Angeles on 10 March 2019.

On 14 March 2019, Pérez was loaned to USL Championship side Phoenix Rising for the 2019 season.
