= Jake Leeker =

American soccer player

Personal information
- Full name: Jacob Leeker
- Date of birth: June 14, 1995 (age 31)
- Place of birth: St. Louis, Missouri, United States
- Height: 6 ft 5 in (1.96 m)
- Position: Goalkeeper

Youth career
- 2011–2012: St. Louis Scott Gallagher

College career
Years	Team	Apps	(Gls)
2014–2017	Memphis Tigers	47	(0)

Senior career*
Years	Team	Apps	(Gls)
2016	Mississippi Brilla	1	(0)
2016–2017	Des Moines Menace	6	(0)
2018	Real Monarchs	17	(0)
2018	→ Real Salt Lake (loan)	0	(0)
2019–2020	Portland Timbers 2	25	(0)
2021	Pittsburgh Riverhounds	5	(0)
- * Club domestic league appearances and goals as of January 14, 2023

Jacob "Jake" Leeker (born June 14, 1995) is an American soccer player who plays as a goalkeeper.

== Career ==
=== College and amateur ===
Leeker played college soccer at the University of Memphis between 2014 and 2017, including a redshirted year in 2013. Leeker totaled 10 shutouts in his 47 appearances for the Tigers to earn a save percentage of .749 in four years as a starter.

While at college, Leeker appeared for Premier Development League sides Mississippi Brilla and Des Moines Menace.

=== Professional ===
On January 29, 2018, Leeker signed with United Soccer League side Real Monarchs.

On January 30, 2019, Leeker joined USL Championship side Portland Timbers 2. Timbers 2 opted to stop operating following the 2020 season.

On March 12, 2021, Pittsburgh Riverhounds SC signed Leeker for the 2021 season with an option for 2022.
