= Sheldon Sullivan =

American soccer player

Personal information
- Date of birth: February 3, 1995 (age 31)
- Place of birth: Stafford, Virginia, United States
- Height: 5 ft 9 in (1.75 m)
- Position: Defender

College career
Years	Team	Apps	(Gls)
2013–2017	Virginia Cavaliers	78	(0)

Senior career*
Years	Team	Apps	(Gls)
2015–2016	Reading United	10	(0)
2018	Rio Grande Valley FC	19	(0)
- * Club domestic league appearances and goals as of 15:44, 16 October 2018 (UTC)

Sheldon Sullivan (born February 3, 1995) is an American soccer player.

== Career ==
=== Youth and college ===
Sullivan played four years of college soccer at the University of Virginia between 2014 and 2017.

Sullivan also played for Premier Development League side Reading United AC in 2015 and 2016.

=== Professional ===
On January 21, 2018, Sullivan was selected 66th overall in the 2018 MLS SuperDraft by Houston Dynamo. On March 16, 2018, Sullivan signed with Houston's United Soccer League affiliate side Rio Grande Valley FC.
