= Ben Spencer (soccer) =

American soccer player

Personal information
- Full name: Ben Fritz Spencer Jr.
- Date of birth: March 28, 1995 (age 31)
- Place of birth: Albuquerque, New Mexico, United States
- Height: 1.97 m (6 ft 5 1/2 in)
- Position: Forward

Youth career
- 2010–2011: Real Salt Lake
- 2011–2012: Chivas USA

Senior career*
Years	Team	Apps	(Gls)
2013–2016	Molde FK	2	(0)
2014	→ Indy Eleven (loan)	11	(2)
2015	→ Toronto FC II (loan)	0	(0)
2016–2017	Toronto FC II	6	(0)
2017–2018	Toronto FC	5	(0)
2017–2018	→ Toronto FC II (loan)	13	(1)
2019	Phoenix Rising	16	(5)
2019	→ FC Tucson (loan)	3	(0)
2020–2021	San Diego Loyal	31	(1)

International career^{‡}
2012	United States U18	8	(6)
2015	United States U20	5	(5)
2014	United States U23	1	(0)
- * Club domestic league appearances and goals as of November 8, 2021 ‡ National team caps and goals as of January 14, 2015

Ben Fritz Spencer Jr. (born March 28, 1995) is a retired American soccer player who played as a forward.

== Club career ==
=== Youth ===
A native of New Mexico, Spencer joined Real Salt Lake's Grande Sports Academy ahead of the 2010–11 season. He left the RSL system for the 2011–12 season for the Chivas USA academy (although his MLS rights were retained by Real Salt Lake). Spencer committed to play college soccer for UC Santa Barbara for the fall 2013 season but instead agreed to join Molde in Norway in December 2012.

=== Professional ===
After several months of training, Spencer signed a professional deal with Molde in April 2013, shortly after turning 18. He made his professional debut in a 4–0 win over Vålerenga on September 1, 2013.

In March 2014 Spencer moved on a season-long loan to NASL side Indy Eleven, returning to Molde in November 2014 upon the completion of his loan deal.

He moved to Toronto FC II in 2015, on loan, however, he suffered a season ending injury and was unable to appear in a match for the team. After the season, Toronto FC acquired his MLS rights from Real Salt Lake. Soon after his loan ended, he joined Toronto FC on a permanent transfer. After spending 2016 with Toronto FC II in the United Soccer League, Spencer made the move up to Toronto FC on May 2, 2017. Spencer was a member of the treble winning Toronto FC team which won the Canadian Cup, Supporters' Shield, and MLS Cup during the 2017 season. He was released by the club in June 2018, after only making 5 appearances in 2 seasons, contributing 2 assists.

In 2019, he joined Phoenix Rising FC in the USL Championship. He scored a penalty kick in the shootout of their 2019 US Open Cup Second Round loss. Spencer had the highest goals-per-minute ratio in the USL Championship during the 2019 season. At the end of the season, he was not re-signed by the club.

Spencer joined San Diego Loyal SC in July 2020.

On December 9, 2021, Spencer announced via his social media platforms his decision to retire from playing professional soccer.

== International career ==
Spencer featured for the United States U18 in 2012, scoring three goals in six matches.. Spencer featured for the United States U20 in 2014 and 2015 and helped the team qualify for the Under-20 World Cup held in New Zealand. Spencer featured once for the United States U23 in a friendly against Brazil.

== Career statistics ==
As of November 1, 2019

Club	Season	Division	League		Cup		Playoffs		Continental		Total	
Club	Season	Division	Apps	Goals	Apps	Goals	Apps	Goals	Apps	Goals	Apps	Goals
Molde	2013	Tippeligaen	2	0	0	0	—		0	0	2	0
Molde	Totals		2	0	0	0	0	0	0	0	2	0
Indy Eleven (loan)	2014	NASL	11	2	2	0	—		—		13	2
Indy Eleven (loan)	Totals		11	2	2	0	0	0	0	0	13	2
Toronto FC II (loan)	2015	USL	0	0	—		—		—		0	0
Toronto FC II	2016	USL	2	0	—		—		—		2	0
Toronto FC II	2017	USL	13	1	—		—		—		13	1
Toronto FC II	2018	USL	4	0	—		—		—		4	0
Toronto FC II	Totals		19	1	0	0	0	0	0	0	19	1
Toronto FC	2017	Major League Soccer	2	0	0	0	0	0	0	0	2	0
Toronto FC	2018	Major League Soccer	3	0	0	0	—		0	0	3	0
Toronto FC	Totals		5	0	0	0	0	0	0	0	5	0
Phoenix Rising	2019	USL Championship	16	5	1	0	2	0	—		19	5
Phoenix Rising	Totals		16	5	1	0	2	0	0	0	19	5
FC Tucson (loan)	2019	USL League One	3	0	—		—		—		3	0
FC Tucson (loan)	Totals		3	0	0	0	0	0	0	0	3	0
Career total			56	8	3	0	2	0	0	0	61	8
