= Matías Zaldívar =

Argentine footballer

Personal information
- Full name: Matías Ezequiel Zaldívar
- Date of birth: 4 August 1995 (age 31)
- Place of birth: Avellaneda, Argentina
- Height: 1.78 m (5 ft 10 in)
- Position: Attacking midfielder

Team information
- Current team: Círculo Deportivo

Youth career
- Arsenal de Sarandí

Senior career*
| Years | Team | Apps | (Gls) |
| 2014–2017 | Arsenal de Sarandí | 8 | (0) |
| 2018 | Rio Grande Valley FC | 19 | (3) |
| 2018 | → Houston Dynamo (loan) | 0 | (0) |
| 2019–2020 | Sportivo Italiano | 11 | (0) |
| 2021 | San Miguel | 9 | (1) |
| 2022 | San Martín de Burzaco | 24 | (0) |
| 2023– | Círculo Deportivo | 0 | (0) |
- * Club domestic league appearances and goals as of 18:05, 10 October 2023 (UTC)

Matías Ezequiel Zaldívar (born 4 August 1995) is an Argentine professional footballer who plays as an attacking midfielder for Círculo Deportivo.

== Career ==
Zaldívar started his career with Argentine Primera División team Arsenal de Sarandí and made his first-team debut for the club on 11 May 2014 against Belgrano as he came on for the final few seconds. He had to wait two years before featuring again, but he did go onto play in five consecutive 2016 Argentine Primera División fixtures. In September 2017, Zaldívar rescinded his contract with Arsenal. On 13 March 2018, Zaldívar joined United Soccer League side Rio Grande Valley FC Toros. He scored his first senior goal on 14 April during a 3–2 loss versus Seattle Sounders FC 2 at Cheney Stadium.

On 5 June, Zaldívar signed for RGVFC's affiliate club Houston Dynamo of Major League Soccer on a short-team loan. He made his debut for Houston Dynamo a day later in the U.S. Open Cup against NTX Rayados, scoring the club's fourth goal in a 5–0 victory in the process. He went back to RGVFC days later. In total, Zaldívar scored three times across nineteen games for Rio Grande Valley FC Toros before departing at the conclusion of the 2018 campaign. A return to his homeland was completed in July 2019, as he penned terms with Primera C Metropolitana's Sportivo Italiano. Ten games followed.

In August 2020, Zaldívar secured a move up to Primera B Metropolitana with San Miguel. He debuted in a goalless draw at home to Talleres on 5 December, having replaced Federico Sena off the bench with twenty-seven minutes remaining.

== Career statistics ==
As of 22 March 2021.

Club statistics
| Club | Season | League | | | Cup | | League Cup | | Continental | | Other | | Total | |
| Club | Season | Division | Apps | Goals | Apps | Goals | Apps | Goals | Apps | Goals | Apps | Goals | Apps | Goals |
|---|---|---|---|---|---|---|---|---|---|---|---|---|---|---|
| Arsenal de Sarandí | 2013–14 | Primera División | 1 | 0 | 0 | 0 | — | | 0 | 0 | 0 | 0 | 1 | 0 |
| Arsenal de Sarandí | 2014 | Primera División | 0 | 0 | 0 | 0 | — | | 0 | 0 | 0 | 0 | 0 | 0 |
| Arsenal de Sarandí | 2015 | Primera División | 0 | 0 | 0 | 0 | — | | 0 | 0 | 0 | 0 | 0 | 0 |
| Arsenal de Sarandí | 2016 | Primera División | 5 | 0 | 0 | 0 | — | | — | | 0 | 0 | 5 | 0 |
| Arsenal de Sarandí | 2016–17 | Primera División | 2 | 0 | 0 | 0 | — | | 0 | 0 | 0 | 0 | 2 | 0 |
| Arsenal de Sarandí | 2017–18 | Primera División | 0 | 0 | 0 | 0 | — | | 0 | 0 | 0 | 0 | 0 | 0 |
| Arsenal de Sarandí | Total | | 8 | 0 | 0 | 0 | — | | 0 | 0 | 0 | 0 | 8 | 0 |
| Rio Grande Valley FC Toros | 2018 | United Soccer League | 19 | 3 | — | | — | | — | | 0 | 0 | 19 | 3 |
| Houston Dynamo (loan) | 2018 | Major League Soccer | 0 | 0 | 1 | 1 | — | | — | | 0 | 0 | 1 | 1 |
| Sportivo Italiano | 2019–20 | Primera C Metropolitana | 10 | 0 | 0 | 0 | — | | — | | 0 | 0 | 10 | 0 |
| San Miguel | 2020 | Primera B Metropolitana | 5 | 0 | 0 | 0 | — | | — | | 0 | 0 | 5 | 0 |
| Career total | | | 42 | 3 | 1 | 1 | — | | 0 | 0 | 0 | 0 | 43 | 4 |
