= Cristian Ojeda (footballer, born 1999) =

Argentine footballer

Personal information
- Full name: Cristian Rómulo Ojeda
- Date of birth: 22 January 1999 (age 27)
- Place of birth: Posadas, Argentina
- Height: 1.67 m (5 ft 5 1/2 in)
- Position: Attacking midfielder

Team information
- Current team: Universidad Técnica de Cajamarca
- Number: 15

Youth career
- 2007–2013: Huracán de Posadas
- 2013–2018: Talleres

Senior career*
Years	Team	Apps	(Gls)
2018–2023	Talleres	6	(0)
2019	→ Portland Timbers 2 (loan)	27	(4)
2020	→ Atenas (loan)	4	(1)
2021	→ Villa Dálmine (loan)	6	(0)
2021–2022	→ Tlaxcala (loan)	12	(0)
2023	Sarmiento	4	(0)
2024–	UTC	3	(0)
- * Club domestic league appearances and goals as of 13:01, 17 April 2024 (UTC)

Cristian Rómulo Ojeda (born 22 January 1999) is an Argentine professional footballer who plays as an attacking midfielder for Universidad Técnica de Cajamarca.

== Club career ==
Before joining Talleres, Ojeda played for the Huracán de Posadas youth system from 2007 to 2013. Midway through the 2017–18 Argentine Primera División season, Talleres promoted Ojeda into their first-team squad. He made his debut on 26 January during a home victory over San Lorenzo. In February, Ojeda made three appearances at 2018 U-20 Copa Libertadores in Uruguay for the club's U20 team. On 1 March 2019, Ojeda joined USL Championship side Portland Timbers 2 on loan for their 2019 season. He scored his first senior goal in a 4–2 defeat at Casino Arizona Field to Phoenix Rising on 29 June.

Ojeda returned to Talleres at the end of 2019 after four goals in twenty-seven matches for the Americans, as he subsequently departed to Uruguayan football with Atenas in August 2020. He made his Segunda División debut on 18 August against Albion, prior to scoring his first goal for Atenas in a 2–2 draw with Villa Española on 1 September. He ended his loan in October after picking up a muscle injury.

== International career ==
In March 2018, Ojeda was selected by the Argentina U20 team that trained and travelled with the seniors for friendlies with Italy and Spain.

== Career statistics ==
As of 19 December 2020.

Club statistics
Club	Season	League			Cup		League Cup		Continental		Other		Total	
Club	Season	Division	Apps	Goals	Apps	Goals	Apps	Goals	Apps	Goals	Apps	Goals	Apps	Goals
Talleres	2017–18	Primera División	5	0	0	0	—		—		0	0	5	0
Talleres	2018–19	Primera División	1	0	0	0	0	0	0	0	0	0	1	0
Talleres	2019–20	Primera División	0	0	0	0	0	0	—		0	0	0	0
Talleres	2020–21	Primera División	0	0	0	0	0	0	—		0	0	0	0
Talleres	Total		6	0	0	0	0	0	0	0	0	0	6	0
Portland Timbers 2 (loan)	2019	USL Championship	27	4	—		—		—		0	0	27	4
Atenas (loan)	2020	Segunda División	4	1	—		—		—		0	0	4	1
Career total			37	5	0	0	0	0	0	0	0	0	37	5
