= Harold Hanson (soccer) =

American soccer player (born 1999)

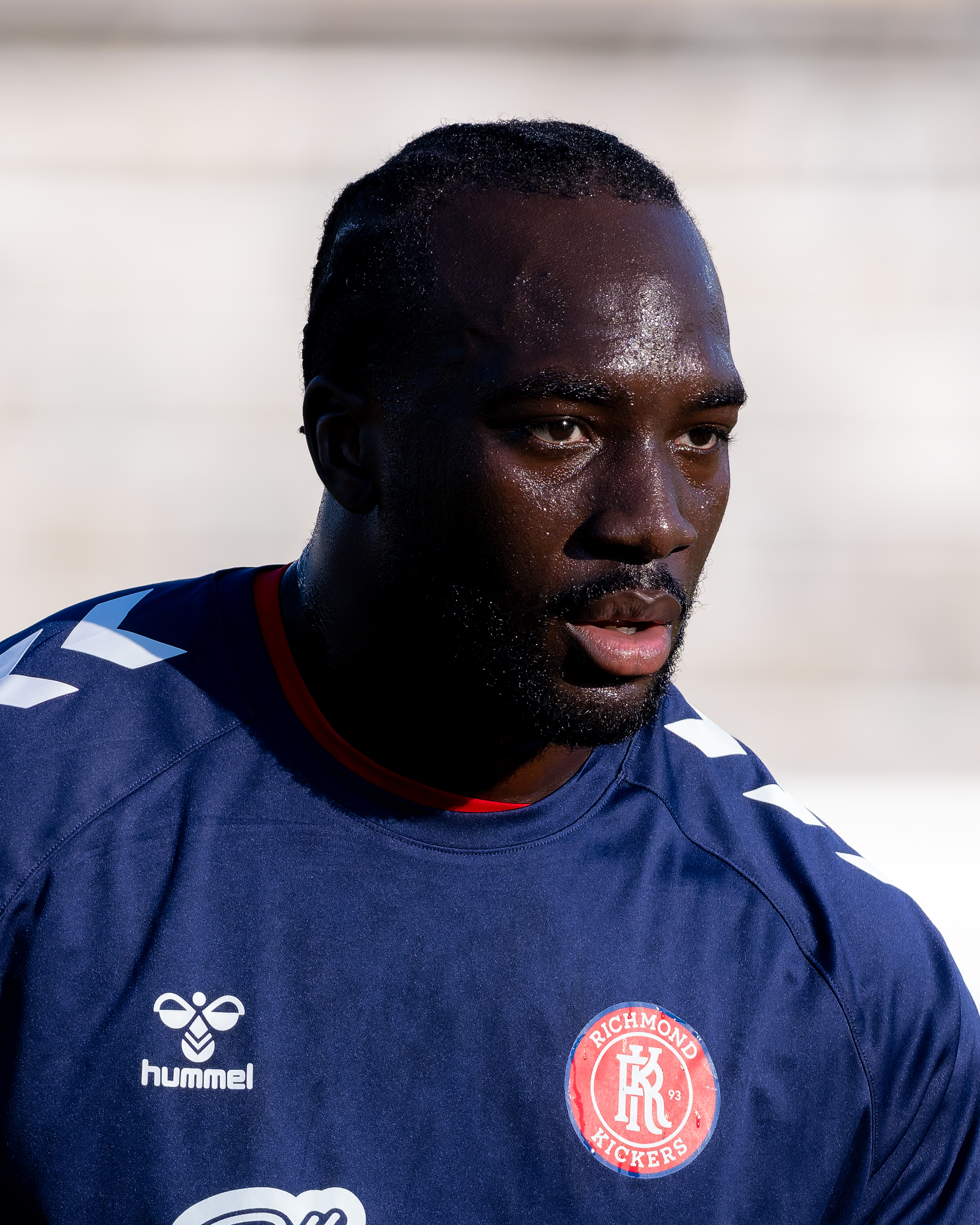
- Hanson with the Richmond Kickers in 2026

Personal information
- Date of birth: July 16, 1999 (age 27)
- Place of birth: Ontario, California, United States
- Height: 1.75 m (5 ft 9 in)
- Position: Right back

Team information
- Current team: Richmond Kickers
- Number: 45

Youth career
- 2015–2017: FC Golden State

Senior career*
Years	Team	Apps	(Gls)
2017–2020	Portland Timbers 2	78	(2)
2017	Portland Timbers	1	(0)
2022	Albion San Diego	19	(1)
2023	Central Valley Fuego	21	(1)
2023–2026	Empire Strykers (indoor)	16	(2)
2026	Eintracht Nordhorn	14	(3)
2026–	Richmond Kickers	13	(0)
- * Club domestic league appearances and goals as of November 2, 2026

Harold Hanson (born July 16, 1999) is an American professional soccer player who plays as a defender for the Richmond Kickers in USL League One.

== Career ==
Born in Ontario, California, Hanson signed for Portland Timbers 2, the reserve side of Portland Timbers, on March 17, 2017. He made his professional debut for Timbers 2 on April 9, 2017, against Orange County SC. Hanson started the match as Timbers 2 were defeated 2–1. On June 14, Hanson was called up to the Portland Timbers first-team for their U.S. Open Cup match against the Seattle Sounders FC. He started the match and played the whole 90 minutes as Portland were knocked-out 2–1.

On July 22, 2017, due to not having enough outfielders, Hanson signed a short-term contract with the Portland Timbers first-team for their Major League Soccer match against the Vancouver Whitecaps FC. He came off the bench in that match in the 89th minute as a substitute for Dairon Asprilla as the Timbers won 2–1.

On January 30, 2019, it was announced that Hanson had signed a new contract with Portland Timbers 2. Timbers 2 opted to stop operating following the 2020 season.

Hanson joined National Independent Soccer Association club Albion San Diego in February 2022.

On March 22, 2023, Hanson signed with USL League One side Central Valley Fuego.

On 21 July 2026, Hanson signed for the Richmond Kickers returning to USL League One.

== Career statistics ==
As of January 5, 2020

Club	Season	League			Cup		Continental		Total	
Club	Season	Division	Apps	Goals	Apps	Goals	Apps	Goals	Apps	Goals
Portland Timbers 2	2017	USL	23	0	—	—	—	—	23	0
Portland Timbers 2	2018	USL	15	1	—	—	—	—	15	1
Portland Timbers 2	2019	USL Championship	25	1	—	—	—	—	25	1
Portland Timbers 2	Total		63	2	—	—	—	—	63	2
Portland Timbers	2017	MLS	1	0	1	0	—	—	2	0
Career total			65	2	0	0	0	0	65	2
