= Todd Wharton =

American soccer player

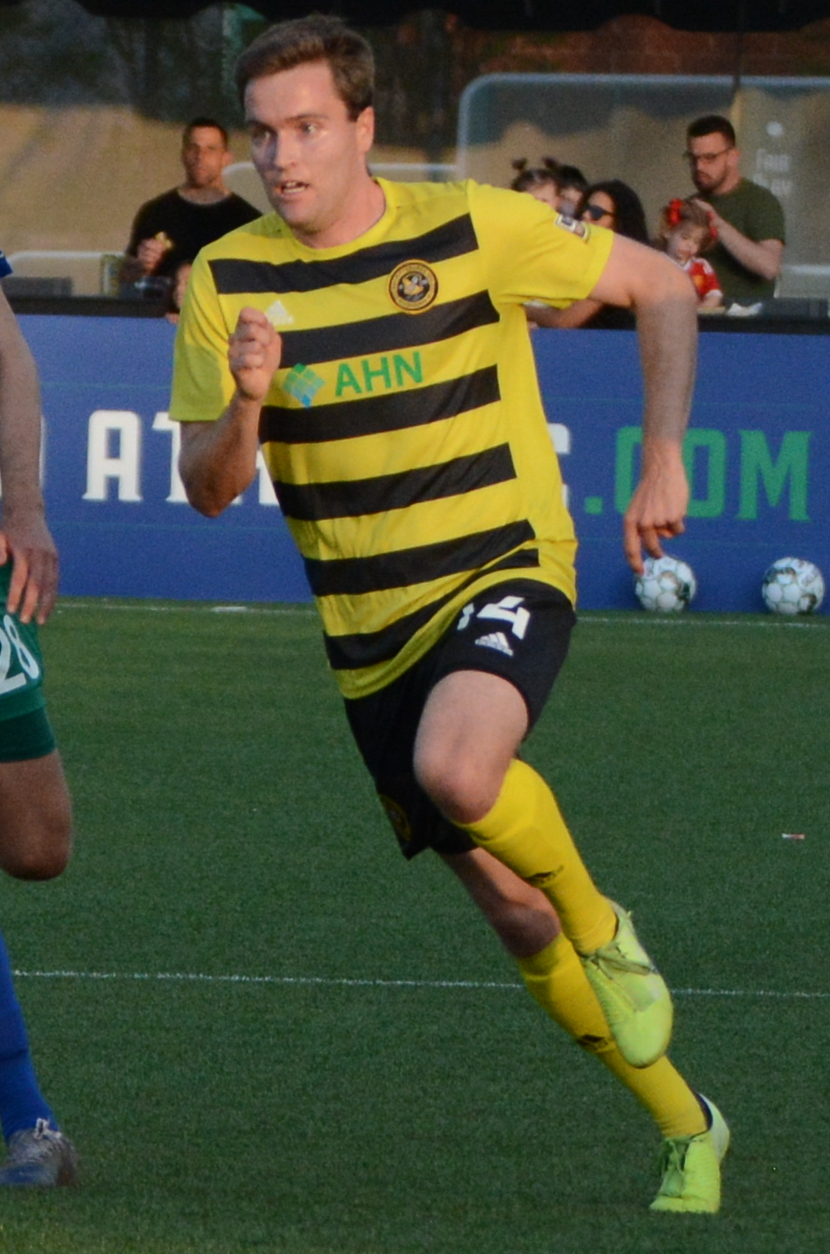
- Wharton with Pittsburgh Riverhounds in 2021

Personal information
- Date of birth: February 8, 1994 (age 32)
- Place of birth: Richmond, Virginia, United States
- Height: 1.83 m (6 ft 0 in)
- Position: Midfielder

Youth career
- 2008–2012: Richmond Strikers

College career
Years	Team	Apps	(Gls)
2012–2015	Virginia Cavaliers	85	(11)

Senior career*
Years	Team	Apps	(Gls)
2013	RVA FC	3	(3)
2015	Portland Timbers U23s	12	(3)
2016–2018	Rio Grande Valley FC	61	(6)
2019	Portland Timbers 2	34	(6)
2020	Saint Louis FC	15	(0)
2021	Pittsburgh Riverhounds	32	(4)
Total		157	(22)
- * Club domestic league appearances and goals as of November 4, 2021

Todd Wharton (born February 8, 1994) is an American former soccer player.

== Career ==
=== Youth and college ===
Wharton played four years of college soccer at the University of Virginia between 2012 and 2015. During his stay at Virginia, Wharton was part of the team that won the 2014 NCAA National Championship.

Wharton also appeared for National Premier Soccer League side RVA FC in 2013 and Premier Development League side Portland Timbers U23s in 2015.

=== Professional ===
On January 13, 2016, Wharton signed a contract with Major League Soccer ahead of the 2016 MLS SuperDraft, where he was expected to go early on in the draft. Surprisingly however, Wharton wasn't selected by any MLS team over the four rounds.

Wharton signed with United Soccer League side Rio Grande Valley FC on March 16, 2016. He made his professional debut on March 26, 2016, as a 66th-minute substitute during a 0–2 loss against Tulsa Roughnecks.

After three seasons with Rio Grande Valley, Wharton moved to Portland Timbers 2 on January 30, 2019.

On December 10, 2019, Wharton moved to USL Championship side Saint Louis FC. Saint Louis FC folded following the 2020 USL Championship season.

On February 19, 2021, Wharton signed with USL Championship side Pittsburgh Riverhounds.

On January 11, 2022, Wharton announced his retirement from professional soccer.
