= 2017 Phoenix Rising FC season =

Phoenix Rising FC
2017 season
- Owners: (Turkey) Berke Bakay (United States) Brett M. Johnson (United States) Tim Riester (United States) Mark Detmer (Ivory Coast) Didier Drogba (United States) Brandon McCarthy (United States) Diplo (United States) Pete Wentz (United States) David Rappaport (United States) Dave Stearns (United States) Rick Hauser (United States) William Kraus (United States) Kevin Kusatsu (United States) Dr. Mark Leber (United States) Jim Scussel (United States) Dr. Christopher Yeung
- Manager: (Canada) Frank Yallop (2-2-0) (United States) Rick Schantz (Interim)(2-3-0) (France) Patrice Carteron (13-3-7)
- Stadium: Phoenix Rising FC Soccer Complex
- USL: 5th, Western Conference
- USL Playoffs: Conference Quarterfinals
- U.S. Open Cup: 3rd Round
- Top goalscorer: Jason Johnson (13)
- Highest home attendance: 7,162 (Team Record) (April 23 v. Swope Park Rangers)
- Lowest home attendance: 4,536 (September 6 v. Orange County SC)
- Average home league attendance: League: 6,127; All: 6,092
- Biggest win: VAN 0–4 PHX (9/24)
- Biggest defeat: PHX 0–4 RNO (5/6)
Home colors	Away colors

The 2017 Phoenix Rising FC season was the club's fourth season of United Soccer League play and the first under a new name and ownership.

== Friendlies ==
All times from this point are on Mountain Standard Time (UTC−07:00)

February 25, 2017 Preseason	Albion SC Pros	3–1	Phoenix Rising FC	San Diego, California
8:30pm	Luquen 4' (pen.), 45+'; Staats (red card) 9'; Waligorski 56' (pen.)	Report	Langman (yellow card) 43'; Pikitis 59' (pen.)	Stadium: Mission Bay High School Stadium

March 4, 2017 Preseason	Grand Canyon University	2–2	Phoenix Rising FC	Phoenix, Arizona
8:00pm	Delmonte 36'; Moreno 58'	Report	Nygard 60'; Seth 69' (pen.)	Stadium: GCU Stadium

March 9, 2017 Preseason	Cal State Fullerton	1–0	Phoenix Rising FC	Fullerton, California
12:00pm				Stadium: Titan Stadium

March 10, 2017 Preseason	Orange County SC	3–0	Phoenix Rising FC	Irvine, California
12:00pm				Stadium: Orange County Great Park

March 17, 2017 Preseason	Grand Canyon University	1–1	Phoenix Rising FC	Phoenix, Arizona
7:00pm	? 77'	Report	Ramage 39'; Wright-Phillips (yellow card) 50'; Greer (yellow card) 62'	Stadium: GCU Stadium

April 29, 2017 Friendly	FC Tucson (1st Half); University of Arizona Men's Team (2nd Half)	1–1; 0–0	Phoenix Rising FC	Tucson, Arizona
7:30pm	Vasquez 36'	Report	Bravo 9' (pen.)	Stadium: Kino Sports Complex; North Stadium; Attendance: 2,115

== USL ==
=== Results summary ===
Overall								Home						Away					
Pld	W	D	L	GF	GA	GD	Pts	W	D	L	GF	GA	GD	W	D	L	GF	GA	GD
32	17	7	8	50	37	+13	58	11	2	3	30	19	+11	6	5	5	20	18	+2

Source: Match reports

Round	1	2	3	4	5	6	7	8	9	10	11	12	13	14	15	16	17	18	19	20	21	22	23	24	25	26	27	28	29	30	31	32
Stadium	H	A	H	H	H	H	A	A	A	H	A	H	A	A	H	A	H	A	A	A	H	H	H	A	H	A	A	A	A	H	H	H
Result	L	L	W	W	L	W	L	W	L	W	D	D	D	D	W	L	L	W	D	D	W	W	D	W	W	W	W	W	L	W	W	W

Updated to match(es) played on October 14, 2017. Source: Match reports
A = Away; H = Home; W = Win; D = Draw; L = Loss

=== League results ===
March 25, 2017 1	Phoenix Rising FC	0–1	Toronto FC II	Scottsdale, Arizona
7:30pm	Greer (yellow card) 65'; Gray (yellow card) 82'	Report; Report	Telfer 8'; Onkony (yellow card) 89'	Stadium: Phoenix Rising FC Soccer Complex; Attendance: 6,890; Referee: Ramy Touchan

April 1, 2017 2	Real Monarchs	2–0	Phoenix Rising FC	Sandy, Utah
3:00pm	Hoffman 45+2' (pen.); Holness 76'	Report; Report	Watson (yellow card) 36'	Stadium: Rio Tinto Stadium; Attendance: 1,771; Referee: Michael Radchuk

April 8, 2017 3	Phoenix Rising FC	2–1	LA Galaxy II	Scottsdale, Arizona
7:30pm	Rooney 60' (pen.), 78'	Report; Report	Amaya 51'; Kempin (yellow card) 60'; Zanga (yellow card) 81'	Stadium: Phoenix Rising FC Soccer Complex; Attendance: 6,330; Referee: Daniel Radford

April 23, 2017 4	Phoenix Rising FC	4–3	Swope Park Rangers	Scottsdale, Arizona
7:00pm	Riggi 22'; Rooney 25' (pen.); Cortez 27'; Ramage 47'; Wakasa (red card) 78'; Wright-Phillips (yellow card) 90+5'	Report; Report	Greczek (yellow card) 24'; Oliveira 79' (pen.), 90'; Duke 90+3'	Stadium: Phoenix Rising FC Soccer Complex; Attendance: 7,162; Referee: Luis Guardia

May 6, 2017 5	Phoenix Rising FC	0–4	Reno 1868 FC	Scottsdale, Arizona
7:30pm		Report; Report	Kelly 2', 6', 66' (yellow card) 66'; Mfeka (yellow card) 74'; Wehan 77'	Stadium: Phoenix Rising FC Soccer Complex; Attendance: 6,067; Referee: Joseph Dickerson

May 13, 2017 6	Phoenix Rising FC	2–1	OKC Energy FC	Scottsdale, Arizona
7:30pm	Cortez (yellow card) 48'; Johnson 50'; Wright-Phillips (yellow card) 86' (goal) 90+5'; Greer (yellow card) 90+2'; Bravo (yellow card) 90+2'	Report; Report	Guzman (yellow card) 87'; Hyland 90+3' (pen.)	Stadium: Phoenix Rising FC Soccer Complex; Attendance: 6,259; Referee: Robi Hullner

May 20, 2017 7	San Antonio FC	1–0	Phoenix Rising FC	San Antonio, Texas
5:30pm	Ajeakwa 12'; McCarthy (yellow card) 90+1'	Report; Report	Wakasa (yellow card) 39'; Bravo (yellow card) 73'	Stadium: Toyota Field; Attendance: 7,414; Referee: Juan Guzman

May 27, 2017 8	LA Galaxy II	1–2	Phoenix Rising FC	Carson, California
7:30pm	Lassiter 13'; Arellano (yellow card) 22'; Zanga (yellow card) 86'	Report; Report	Timm (yellow card) 30'; Avila 32'; Johnson 61' (pen.); Watson (yellow card) 64'; Gray (yellow card) 75'	Stadium: StubHub Center; Attendance: 2,502; Referee: Chipalo Street

June 6, 2017 9	OKC Energy FC	3–2	Phoenix Rising FC	Oklahoma City, Oklahoma
5:30pm	Guzman (yellow card) 40'; Wojcik 45+2', 69' (yellow card) 72'; Hyland 56'	Report; Report	Greer 47' (yellow card) 90+1'; Arreola 83'; Watson (yellow card) 85'	Stadium: Taft Stadium; Attendance: 3,632; Referee: Caleb Mendez

June 10, 2017 10	Phoenix Rising FC	2–1	Vancouver Whitecaps 2	Scottsdale, Arizona
7:30pm	Bravo (yellow card) 19'; Drogba 40'; Wright-Phillips 77'	Report; Report	Greig (yellow card) 16'; Norman Jr. (yellow card) 52'; Bustos 69' (pen.)	Stadium: Phoenix Rising FC Soccer Complex; Attendance: 7,062; Referee: Ramy Touchan

June 18, 2017 11	Swope Park Rangers	2–2	Phoenix Rising FC	Kansas City, Missouri
2:00pm	Doyle (yellow card) 9'; Oliveira 26' (pen.); Selbol 62' (pen.) (yellow card) 65'; Duke (yellow card) 77'	Report; Report	Greer (yellow card) 25'; Drogba 57', 89' (pen.) (yellow card) 86'	Stadium: Children's Mercy Victory Field; Attendance: 1,405; Referee: Ekaterina "Katja" Koroleva

June 24, 2017 12	Phoenix Rising FC	1–1	Real Monarchs	Scottsdale, Arizona
8:00pm	Bravo (yellow card) 26' (goal) 45'	Report; Report	Haber 12'; Curinga (yellow card) 14'	Stadium: Phoenix Rising FC Soccer Complex; Attendance: 6,365; Referee: Younes Marrakchi

June 30, 2017 13	Reno 1868 FC	0–0	Phoenix Rising FC	Reno, Nevada
7:45pm	Brown (yellow card) 86'	Report; Report	Wakasa (yellow card) 34'; Drogba (yellow card) 90+4'	Stadium: Greater Nevada Field; Attendance: 7,092; Referee: Rosendo Mendoza

July 8, 2017 14	Orange County SC	1–1	Phoenix Rising FC	Irvine, California
5:00pm	Etim (yellow card) 64'; Meeus (yellow card) 77' (goal) 84'	Report; Report	Timm (yellow card) 50'; Drogba (yellow card) 79' (goal) 90+4'	Stadium: Orange County Great Park; Attendance: 4,554; Referee: Malik Badawi

July 15, 2017 15	Phoenix Rising FC	2–1	Colorado Springs Switchbacks	Scottsdale, Arizona
8:00pm	Timm (yellow card) 28'; Johnson 66', 84' (yellow card) 90+3'; Watson (yellow card) 90'; Cohen (yellow card) 90+7'	Report; Report	Frater 12'; Phillips (yellow card) 90+8'	Stadium: Phoenix Rising FC Soccer Complex; Attendance: 5,605; Referee: Daniel Radford

July 22, 2017 16	Tulsa Roughnecks FC	3–0	Phoenix Rising FC	Tulsa, Oklahoma
5:30pm	Svantesson 15'; Hayes (yellow card) 28' (goal) 44'; Thierjung 85'	Report; Report	Wright-Phillips (yellow card) 65'; Watson (yellow card) 65'	Stadium: ONEOK Field; Attendance: 5,647; Referee: Jon Freemon

July 29, 2017 17	Phoenix Rising FC	0–1	San Antonio FC	Scottsdale, Arizona
8:00pm	Johnson (yellow card) 49'; Ramage (yellow card) 50'; Riggi (yellow card) 75'; Wright-Phillips (yellow card) 76'; Drogba (yellow card) 90+4'	Report; Report	O'Ojong (yellow card) 49'; Castillo (yellow card) 37' (goal) 85' (pen.); Tyrpak (yellow card) 75'; Elizondo (yellow card) 79'; McCarthy (yellow card) 90+3'	Stadium: Phoenix Rising FC Soccer Complex; Attendance: 5,463; Referee: Mark Allatin

August 5, 2017 18	LA Galaxy II	0–2	Phoenix Rising FC	Carson, California
7:30pm	Payeras (yellow card) 82'	Report; Report	Drogba 13'; Riggi 45'	Stadium: StubHub Center; Attendance: 1,076; Referee: Ramy Touchan

August 12, 2017 19	Rio Grande Valley Toros	1–1	Phoenix Rising FC	Edinburg, Texas
5:30pm	Bird (yellow card) 90+4'; Magalhães 90+5'	Report; Report	Gibbons (yellow card) 30'; Gavin (yellow card) 34'; Johnson 41' (pen.); Wright-Phillips (yellow card) 59'; Dia (yellow card) 67' (red card) 86'; Riggi (yellow card) 85'; Mala (red card) 88'	Stadium: H-E-B Park; Attendance: 8,866; Referee: Rosendo Mendoza

August 18, 2017 20	Orange County SC	1–1	Phoenix Rising FC	Irvine, California
7:30pm	Chaplow (yellow card) 16'; Abolaji 89'	Report	Cortez 18'; Gray (red card) 43'	Stadium: Orange County Great Park; Attendance: 4,963; Referee: Joseph Dickerson

August 26, 2017 21	Phoenix Rising FC	3–1	Sacramento Republic FC	Scottsdale, Arizona
8:00pm	Cortez 10'; Wakasa (yellow card) 38'; Johnson 48' (yellow card) 90+3'; Ramage 52'	Report; Report	Partain (yellow card) 37'; Caesar 50'	Stadium: Phoenix Rising FC Soccer Complex; Attendance: 5,693; Referee: Timothy Ford

September 2, 2017 22	Phoenix Rising FC	2–0	Seattle Sounders 2	Scottsdale, Arizona
7:30pm	Cortez (yellow card) 43'; Dia 78'; Johnson 90+4'	Report; Report	Alfaro (yellow card) 10'; Chenkam (yellow card) 28'; Delem (yellow card) 83'	Stadium: Phoenix Rising FC Soccer Complex; Attendance: 6,150; Referee: Farhad Dadkho

September 6, 2017 23	Phoenix Rising FC	0–0	Orange County SC	Scottsdale, Arizona
7:30pm		Report; Report	Chaplow (yellow card) 63'	Stadium: Phoenix Rising FC Soccer Complex; Attendance: 4,536; Referee: Baboucarr Jallow

September 9, 2017 24	Colorado Springs Switchbacks	1–2	Phoenix Rising FC	Colorado Springs, Colorado
5:00pm	Tae-seong (yellow card) 64'; Malcolm (yellow card) 70'; Uzo (yellow card) 71'; Ajeakwa 83'	Report; Report	Mala (yellow card) 1'; Gavin (yellow card) 45+1'; Dia 50'; Lambert (yellow card) 57'; Gray 86'	Stadium: Weidner Field; Attendance: 3,582; Referee: Mark Allatin

September 16, 2017 25	Phoenix Rising FC	2–0	Real Monarchs	Scottsdale, Arizona
7:30pm	Awako (yellow card) 4'; Hamilton 29'; Dia (yellow card) 54'; Johnson 73'; Cohen (yellow card) 90+2'	Report; Report	Cruz (yellow card) 90+3'	Stadium: Phoenix Rising FC Soccer Complex; Attendance: 6,008; Referee: Ismir Pekmic

September 20, 2017 26	Seattle Sounders 2	0–1	Phoenix Rising FC	Tukwila, Washington
7:30pm	Delem (yellow card) 42' (red card) 64'; Ulysse (yellow card) 84'	Report; Report	Vásquez (yellow card) 33' (yellow card) 60'; Riggi 44'; Johnson (yellow card) 75'	Stadium: Starfire Sports Complex; Attendance: 966; Referee: Ekaterina "Katja" Koroleva
Note: Referee assessed two yellow cards to a Phoenix player, but failed to give the player a red card and send him off.

September 24, 2017 27	Vancouver Whitecaps 2	0–4	Phoenix Rising FC	Vancouver, British Columbia
3:00pm		Report; Report	Johnson 4'; Riggi 6'; Cortez 50'; Awako 76'	Stadium: Thunderbird Stadium; Attendance: 827; Referee: Alain Ruch

September 27, 2017 28	Portland Timbers 2	0–2	Phoenix Rising FC	Portland, Oregon
7:30pm	Jimenez (yellow card) 74'	Report; Report	Wright-Phillips 8'; Johnson 82'; Ramage (yellow card) 87'; Gavin (yellow card) 90+2'	Stadium: Providence Park; Attendance: 1,867; Referee: Jeff Arthurholtz

September 30, 2017 29	Sacramento Republic FC	2–0	Phoenix Rising FC	Sacramento, California
7:30pm	McGlynn (yellow card) 45+2'; Klimenta 49'; Cazarez 54'; Kiffe (yellow card) 60'; Hall (yellow card) 76'	Report; Report	Hamilton (yellow card) 34'; Watson (yellow card) 48'	Stadium: Papa Murphy's Park; Attendance: 11,569; Referee: Victor Rivas

October 4, 2017 30	Phoenix Rising FC	4–3	Tulsa Roughnecks FC	Scottsdale, Arizona
7:00pm	Drogba 16', 24' (pen.); Johnson 19', 66'; Gavin (yellow card) 73'	Report; Report	Rivas 12'; Caffa 14'; Thierjung 30'	Stadium: Phoenix Rising FC Soccer Complex; Attendance: 5,681; Referee: Malik Badawi

October 7, 2017 31	Phoenix Rising FC	2–0	Rio Grande Valley Toros	Scottsdale, Arizona
7:30pm	Johnson 34'; Drogba 75'	Report; Report		Stadium: Phoenix Rising FC Soccer Complex; Attendance: 6,046; Referee: Luis Guardia

October 14, 2017 32	Phoenix Rising FC	4–1	Portland Timbers 2	Scottsdale, Arizona
7:30pm	Lambert 4' (yellow card) 72'; Cortez 13'; Drogba 56'; Watson 75'	Report; Report	Williams 60'; Zambrano (yellow card) 63'	Stadium: Phoenix Rising FC Soccer Complex; Attendance: 6,711; Referee: Anthony Bersano

=== USL Playoffs ===
October 21, 2017	Swope Park Rangers	1–1 (a.e.t.) (4–2 p)	Phoenix Rising FC	Kansas City, Missouri
7:30 pm CDT	Didic 109'	Report; Report	Drogba 99'	Stadium: Children's Mercy Victory Field; Attendance: 912; Referee: Guido Gonzales Jr.
	Penalties
	Selbol (penalty scored); Duke (penalty scored); Belmar (penalty scored); Moloto (penalty scored)		(penalty missed) Lambert; (penalty scored) Dia; (penalty scored) Awako; (penalty missed) Mala
Note: Match was postponed due to lightning and heavy rain after the first half, Second half was played the following day.

=== Western Conference standings ===
Pos	Team	Pld	W	D	L	GF	GA	GD	Pts	Qualification
3	Reno 1868 FC	32	17	8	7	75	39	+36	59	Conference Playoffs
4	Swope Park Rangers	32	17	7	8	55	37	+18	58	Conference Playoffs
5	Phoenix Rising FC	32	17	7	8	50	37	+13	58	Conference Playoffs
6	OKC Energy FC	32	14	7	11	46	41	+5	49	Conference Playoffs
7	Tulsa Roughnecks	32	14	4	14	46	49	−3	46	Conference Playoffs

Source: 2017 USL standings
Rules for classification: 1) total wins; 2) total goal differential; 3) total goals scored; 4) points earned against top four Conference finishers; 5) disciplinary points; 6) coin toss or drawing of lots

== U.S. Open Cup ==
May 17, 2017 Second round	Fresno Fuego	1–3	Phoenix Rising FC	Fresno, California
7:00pm	Sousa 59'; Campos (red card) 83'; Nus (yellow card) 90+'	Report	Wakasa 33'; Avila 35'; Greer (yellow card) 46'; Seth 54'; Gibbons (yellow card) 77'	Stadium: Fresno State Soccer & Lacrosse Stadium; Attendance: 1,499; Referee: Matthew Buckman

May 31, 2017 Third round	Phoenix Rising FC	1–2	San Francisco Deltas	Scottsdale, Arizona
7:30pm	Greer (yellow card) 40'; Timm (yellow card) 45+1'; Bravo 86' (pen.)	Report	Attakora (yellow card) 49'; Bekker 82'; Teijsse (yellow card) 84'; Stephens (yellow card) 86'; Heinemann 90+5'	Stadium: Phoenix Rising FC Soccer Complex; Attendance: 5,532; Referee: Robi Hullner

== Statistics ==
(regular-season & Playoffs)

#	Pos.	Name	GP	GS	Min.	Goals	Assists	A yellow rectangle, denoting the yellow penalty card shown to a player being cautioned	A red rectangle, denoting the red penalty card shown to a player being sent off
14	FW	(Jamaica) Jason Johnson	30	19	1,830	13	3	4	0
11	FW	(Ivory Coast) Didier Drogba	14	13	1,196	10	3	4	0
7	FW	(United States) Chris Cortez	21	19	1,630	5	5	2	0
17	MF	(Canada) Alessandro Riggi	21	15	1,218	4	4	1	0
29	MF	(England) Shaun Wright-Phillips	26	22	1,922	3	3	5	0
10	MF	(England) Luke Rooney	5	5	317	3	1	0	0
5	DF	(England) Peter Ramage	25	25	2,194	2	0	2	0
19	DF	(United States) Amadou Dia	22	20	1,831	2	3	1	1
8	MF	(England) Matt Watson	31	24	2,300	1	1	6	0
9	FW	(Mexico) Omar Bravo	13	11	1,009	1	2	4	0
24	MF	(Canada) A. J. Gray	24	7	824	1	0	2	1
27	MF	(Jamaica) Kevon Lambert	10	8	805	1	0	2	0
16	MF	(United States) Sam Hamilton	14	9	750	1	0	1	0
28	MF	(Ghana) Gladson Awako	11	7	710	1	2	1	0
30	MF	(United States) Eric Avila	11	5	534	1	0	0	0
34	DF	(United States) J. J. Greer	7	4	438	1	0	4	0
13	MF	(United States) Eder Arreola	6	0	109	1	0	0	0
3	DF	(United States) Kody Wakasa	26	25	2,287	0	4	4	1
25	DF	(United States) Victor Vásquez	25	25	2,180	0	0	0	1
33	DF	(England) Jordan Stewart	23	23	2,079	0	0	0	0
4	MF	(United States) Blair Gavin	17	12	1,050	0	1	4	0
2	DF	(Ivory Coast) Doueugui Mala	10	9	855	0	0	1	1
6	MF	(South Africa) Miguel Timm	10	9	743	0	0	3	0
15	MF	(England) Jordan Gibbons	7	6	494	0	0	1	0
23	FW	(United States) Matthew Hurlow-Paonessa	8	3	273	0	1	0	0
20	MF	(El Salvador) Romilio Hernandez	2	2	113	0	0	0	0
12	FW	(United States) Mike Seth	4	2	98	0	1	0	0
2	DF	(Nigeria) Uchenna Uzo	1	1	90	0	0	0	0

=== Goalkeepers ===
#	Name	GP	GS	Min.	SV	GA	GAA	SO	A yellow rectangle, denoting the yellow penalty card shown to a player being cautioned	A red rectangle, denoting the red penalty card shown to a player being sent off
18	(United States) Josh Cohen	28	28	2,520	79	32	1.143	8	2	0
1	(United States) Carl Woszczynski	5	5	450	15	6	1.200	1	0	0

== Transfers ==
=== Loan in ===
Start date	End date	Position	No.	Player	From club
August 10, 2017	End of Season	Midfielder	16	(United States) Sam Hamilton	(United States) Colorado Rapids
September 7, 2017	End of Season	Goalkeeper	12	(United States) John Berner	(United States) Colorado Rapids

== See also ==
- 2017 in American soccer
- 2017 USL season
- Phoenix Rising FC
