= 2018 Phoenix Rising FC season =

Phoenix Rising FC
2018 season
- Owners: Berke Bakay; Brett M. Johnson; Alex Zheng; Tim Riester; Mark Detmer; Didier Drogba; Brandon McCarthy; Diplo; Pete Wentz; David Rappaport; Dave Stearns; Rick Hauser; William Kraus; Kevin Kusatsu; Dr. Mark Leber; Jim Scussel; Dr. Christopher Yeung
- Manager: Patrice Carteron (7-3-4); Rick Schantz (Interim)(15-7-2)
- Stadium: Phoenix Rising FC Soccer Complex
- USL: 3rd, Western Conference
- USL Playoffs: Conference Champions
- U.S. Open Cup: 2nd Round
- Top goalscorer: Chris Cortez (19)
- Highest home attendance: 7,707 (Team Record) (Playoff) (October 26 v. Swope Park Rangers)
- Lowest home attendance: 5,017 (August 22 v. San Antonio FC)
- Average home league attendance: Regular Season: 6,380; Playoffs: 7,609
Home colors	Away colors	Third colors

The 2018 Phoenix Rising FC season was the club's fifth season in the United Soccer League and their second under the Rising FC name.

== Friendlies ==
All times from this point are on Mountain Standard Time (UTC-07:00)

February 10, 2018 Mobile Mini Sun Cup	Phoenix Rising FC	2–3	New York Red Bulls	Scottsdale, Arizona
7:00pm	Collin 7' (o.g.); Frater 75'	Report; Report	Muyl 37'; Bezecourt 90'; Escobar 90+1'	Stadium: Phoenix Rising FC Soccer Complex; Attendance: 6,620

February 14, 2018 Mobile Mini Sun Cup	Phoenix Rising FC	0–2	Colorado Rapids	Scottsdale, Arizona
6:00pm		Report; Report	Badji 75'; Smith 80'	Stadium: Phoenix Rising FC Soccer Complex; Attendance: 3,418

February 17, 2018 Mobile Mini Sun Cup	Phoenix Rising FC	1–2	Sporting Kansas City	Scottsdale, Arizona
3:00pm	Frater 5'; Cortez (yellow card) 38'; Lambert (yellow card) 71'	Report; Report	Sánchez 17'; Sallói 30'; Espinoza (yellow card) 34'	Stadium: Phoenix Rising FC Soccer Complex; Attendance: 5,060

February 21, 2018 Mobile Mini Sun Cup	Phoenix Rising FC	0–1	Houston Dynamo	Tucson, Arizona
5:00pm	Farrell (yellow card) 24'	Report; Report	Ward (red card) 38'; Álvarez 41'; Fuenmayor (yellow card) 78'	Stadium: Kino North Stadium

February 24, 2018 Mobile Mini Sun Cup	Phoenix Rising FC	2–1	New York Red Bulls	Tucson, Arizona
2:00pm	da Fonte (yellow card) 8'; Asante 28'; Mala (red card) 47'; Drogba 54' (pen.); Fernandez (yellow card) 68'	Report; Report	Stevens (yellow card) 8'; White 65'	Stadium: Kino North Stadium

February 28, 2018 International	L.D.U. Quito (Ecuador)	2–2 (3–2 p)	(United States) Phoenix Rising FC	Quito, Ecuador
5:30pm	Rodríguez 3'; Anangonó 52'	Report; Report	Drogba 55'; Farrell 83'	Stadium: Estadio Rodrigo Paz Delgado
	Penalties
	Anangonó (penalty missed); Borja (penalty scored); Salaberry (penalty scored); Villena (penalty missed); Barcos (penalty scored)		(penalty scored) Cortez; (penalty missed) Awako; (penalty missed) Riggi; (penalty scored) Johnson; (penalty missed) Fernandez

== USL ==
=== Results summary ===
Overall								Home						Away					
Pld	W	D	L	GF	GA	GD	Pts	W	D	L	GF	GA	GD	W	D	L	GF	GA	GD
34	19	6	9	63	38	+25	63	10	3	4	35	16	+19	9	3	5	28	22	+6

Source: Match reports

Round	1	2	3	4	5	6	7	8	9	10	11	12	13	14	15	16	17	18	19	20	21	22	23	24	25	26	27	28	29	30	31	32	33	34
Stadium	A	H	A	H	A	H	H	H	A	A	H	A	A	A	H	H	A	H	A	H	A	A	H	A	H	H	H	A	A	A	H	H	A	H
Result	D	W	W	L	W	D	D	W	W	W	L	L	W	D	W	W	D	W	L	W	L	W	L	W	W	W	W	L	W	W	W	D	L	L

Updated to match(es) played on October 13, 2018. Source: Match reports
A = Away; H = Home; W = Win; D = Draw; L = Loss

=== League results ===
March 17, 2018 1	Orange County SC	1–1	Phoenix Rising FC	Irvine, California
7:00pm	Seaton (yellow card) 28'; Quinn (yellow card) 68'; Crognale (yellow card) 83' (goal) 90'	Report; Report	Asante 11' (yellow card) 36'; Mala (yellow card) 20'; Dubose (yellow card) 85'	Stadium: Champions Stadium; Attendance: 3,127; Referee: Michael Radchuk

March 24, 2018 2	Phoenix Rising FC	4–1	OKC Energy FC	Scottsdale, Arizona
7:00pm	Asante 28'; Cortez 45', 83', 90+4'; Woszczynski (yellow card) 90+1'	Report; Report	Guzman (yellow card) 21'; Dixon (yellow card) 21'; González (yellow card) 52'; Ibeagha 85'	Stadium: Phoenix Rising FC Soccer Complex; Attendance: 6,828; Referee: Malik Badawi

March 31, 2018 3	Reno 1868 FC	0–1	Phoenix Rising FC	Reno, Nevada
	Abend (yellow card) 69'	Report; Report	Asante (yellow card) 68' (goal) 90+2' (pen.); Mala (yellow card) 73'	Stadium: Greater Nevada Field; Attendance: 4,104; Referee: Joseph Dickerson

April 7, 2018 4	Phoenix Rising FC	0–1	Real Monarchs	Scottsdale, Arizona
7:30pm	Lambert (yellow card) 28'; Fernandez (yellow card) 50'; Drogba (yellow card) 90+3'	Report; Report	Velásquez 56'; Heard (yellow card) 58'; Brody (yellow card) 65'; Ryden (yellow card) 71'; Portillo (yellow card) 78'; Chang (yellow card) 90+5'	Stadium: Phoenix Rising FC Soccer Complex; Attendance: 6,531; Referee: Ramy Touchan

April 11, 2018 5	LA Galaxy II	0–1	Phoenix Rising FC	Carson, California
7:30pm	Acheampong (yellow card) 31'; Büscher (yellow card) 90+4'	Report; Report	Drogba 64' da Fonte (yellow card) 90+2'	Stadium: StubHub Track & Field Stadium; Attendance: 1,236; Referee: Alejandro Mariscal

April 21, 2018 6	Phoenix Rising FC	2–2	Swope Park Rangers	Scottsdale, Arizona
7:00pm	Lambert (yellow card) 8' (red card) 90+2'; Dubose (yellow card) 45'; Musa (yellow card) 52'; Forbes 66'; Asante 90'	Report; Report	Hernandez (yellow card) 25'; Didic (yellow card) 28'; Belmar 70', 88' (yellow card) 89'; Kuzain (yellow card) 77'	Stadium: Phoenix Rising FC Soccer Complex; Attendance: 6,310; Referee: Victor Rivas

April 28, 2018 7	Phoenix Rising FC	1–1	Fresno FC	Scottsdale, Arizona
7:00pm	Dia (red card) 26'; Mala (yellow card) 54'; Riggi (yellow card) 82' (goal) 90'	Report; Report	Daly (yellow card) 27'; Ribeiro (yellow card) 45+3'; Johnson 47'; Barrera (yellow card) 78'; Verhoeven (yellow card) 88'	Stadium: Phoenix Rising FC Soccer Complex; Attendance: 5,829; Referee: Greg Dopka

May 4, 2018 8	Phoenix Rising FC	4–3	LA Galaxy II	Scottsdale, Arizona
7:30pm	Johnson 21', 71'; Riggi 47'; Drogba 78' (pen.)	Report; Report	Alvarez 19'; Llanez 26'; Arellano 40' (yellow card) 56'	Stadium: Phoenix Rising FC Soccer Complex; Attendance: 7,332; Referee: Ismir Pekmic

May 9, 2018 9	OKC Energy FC	0–3	Phoenix Rising FC	Oklahoma City, Oklahoma
5:00pm	Chavez (yellow card) 54'; Ross (yellow card) 61'; Ibeagha (yellow card) 77'; Dixon (yellow card) 88'	Report; Report	Farrell 16' da Fonte 22' (yellow card) 54'; Johnson 75'	Stadium: Taft Stadium; Attendance: 2,616; Referee: Marcos DeOliveira

May 12, 2018 10	Tulsa Roughnecks FC	1–5	Phoenix Rising FC	Tulsa, Oklahoma
5:00pm	Arce 11' (pen.) (yellow card) 23'; Jusino (yellow card) 36'; Gamble (yellow card) 41'; Vukovic (yellow card) 81'	Report; Report	Drogba 4', 69'; Lambert 66' (yellow card) 73'; Wakasa 80'; Cortez 87'	Stadium: ONEOK Field; Attendance: 3,586; Referee: Matt Franz

May 19, 2018 11	Phoenix Rising FC	1–3	Sacramento Republic FC	Scottsdale, Arizona
7:30pm	Wakasa (yellow card) 45+2' da Fonte (yellow card) 59'; Cortez 62'; Drogba (yellow card) 90+2'	Report; Report	Iwasa 8'; Bijev 21' (yellow card) 39'; Rodriguez (yellow card) 32'; Gomez (yellow card) 41'; Matjašič (yellow card) 64'; Kneeshaw 88'; Taintor (yellow card) 90+2'	Stadium: Phoenix Rising FC Soccer Complex; Attendance: 6,503; Referee: J.J. Bilinski

May 26, 2018 12	Swope Park Rangers	1–0	Phoenix Rising FC	Kansas City, Kansas
2:00pm	Barry 4'; Didic (yellow card) 49'; Zendejas (yellow card) 78'	Report; Report	Dia (yellow card) 30'; Johnson (yellow card) 57'	Stadium: Children's Mercy Park; Attendance: 916; Referee: Farhad Dadkho

May 30, 2018 13	Saint Louis FC	1–3	Phoenix Rising FC	Fenton, Missouri
5:30pm	Barden (yellow card) 38'; Rudolph 74'	Report; Report	Cortez 6'; Asante 49'; Musa (yellow card) 58'; Johnson 68'	Stadium: Toyota Stadium; Attendance: 4,318; Referee: Kevin Broadley

June 9, 2018 14	Sacramento Republic FC	0–0	Phoenix Rising FC	Sacramento, California
8:00pm	Villarreal (yellow card) 53'; Taintor (yellow card) 85'	Report; Report	Dia (yellow card) 13'; Awako (yellow card) 54'; Lambert (yellow card) 83'	Stadium: Papa Murphy's Park; Attendance: 11,569; Referee: Victor Rivas

June 13, 2018 15	Phoenix Rising FC	4–0	Las Vegas Lights	Scottsdale, Arizona
7:30pm	Johnson 32', 77'; Wakasa (yellow card) 42'; Farrell 53'; Woszczynski (yellow card) 90+1'; Asante 90+2' (pen.)	Report; Report	Huiqui (yellow card) 52'; Mathers (yellow card) 56'; Ferriño (yellow card) 79'	Stadium: Phoenix Rising FC Soccer Complex; Attendance: 5,939; Referee: Rubiel Vazquez

June 16, 2018 16	Phoenix Rising FC	3–0	Tulsa Roughnecks FC	Scottsdale, Arizona
7:30pm	Cortez 38'; Johnson 42' (yellow card) 43'; Musa (yellow card) 57'; Farrell (yellow card) 78'; Frater 89'; Waldrep (yellow card) 90+1'	Report; Report	Pírez (yellow card) 30' (red card) 45+1'; Ugarte (yellow card) 60'; Cerda (yellow card) 73'	Stadium: Phoenix Rising FC Soccer Complex; Attendance: 6,273; Referee: Michael Radchuk

June 23, 2018 17	Rio Grande Valley Toros	0–0	Phoenix Rising FC	Edinburg, Texas
5:30pm	Padilla (yellow card) 34'	Report	Musa (yellow card) 47'	Stadium: H-E-B Park; Attendance: 5,649; Referee: Ramy Touchan

June 29, 2018 18	Phoenix Rising FC	1–0	Orange County SC	Scottsdale, Arizona
7:30pm	Cortez 13'; Wakasa (red card) 35'; Asante (yellow card) 37' da Fonte (yellow card) 55'; Woszczynski (yellow card) 89'	Report; Report		Stadium: Phoenix Rising FC Soccer Complex; Attendance: 7,001; Referee: Mark Allatin

July 14, 2018 19	Fresno FC	4–0	Phoenix Rising FC	Fresno, California
7:00pm	Chaney 25'; Ellis-Hayden (yellow card) 29' (red card) 84'; Del Campo (yellow card) 54'; Ribeiro 64'; Caffa 67'; Johnson 73'; Cuevas (yellow card) 88'	Report; Report	Mala (yellow card) 34'; Lambert (red card) 43'; Awako (yellow card) 52'	Stadium: Chukchansi Park; Attendance: 3,914; Referee: Michael Radchuk

July 20, 2018 20	Phoenix Rising FC	1–0	Seattle Sounders 2	Scottsdale, Arizona
8:00pm	Cortez 56'; Musa (yellow card) 70'	Report; Report	Burke-Gilroy (yellow card) 48'; Ulysse (yellow card) 53'; Usman (yellow card) 83'; Hinds (yellow card) 86'	Stadium: Phoenix Rising FC Soccer Complex; Attendance: 7,381; Referee: Ismir Pekmic

July 28, 2018 21	Real Monarchs	4–1	Phoenix Rising FC	Herriman, Utah
7:00pm	Velásquez 37' da Fonte 43' (o.g.); Heard (yellow card) 45'; Henley (yellow card) 60'; Chang (yellow card) 61'; Hoffman 65'; Portillo (yellow card) 77'; Brody 84'	Report; Report	Awako (red card) 62'; Ryden 76' (o.g.) da Fonte (yellow card) 78'; Woszczynski (yellow card) 85'	Stadium: Zions Bank Stadium; Attendance: 1,743; Referee: Lukasz Szpala

August 5, 2018 22	Portland Timbers 2	1–4	Phoenix Rising FC	Portland, Oregon
12:00pm	Farfan 72'	Report; Report	Cortez 8', 82' (yellow card) 68'; Fernandez 63'; Musa (yellow card) 85'; Asante 89'; Johnson (yellow card) 90+2'	Stadium: Providence Park; Attendance: 1,536; Referee: Mike Hohnholz

August 11, 2018 23	Phoenix Rising FC	3–4	Orange County SC	Scottsdale, Arizona
7:30pm	Fernandez (yellow card) 38'; Mala (yellow card) 59'; Asante 68' (pen.), 73', 90+4'	Report; Report	Seaton 39' (yellow card) 40' (goal) 67'; Enevoldsen 48'; Quinn 65' (pen.); Alston (yellow card) 90+1'	Stadium: Phoenix Rising FC Soccer Complex; Attendance: 6,330; Referee: Malik Badawi

August 18, 2018 24	Las Vegas Lights	0–2	Phoenix Rising FC	Las Vegas, Nevada
8:00pm	Pérez (yellow card) 29'; Íñigo (yellow card) 65'; Salgado (yellow card) 72'	Report; Report	Asante 10'; Vega (yellow card) 79'; Frater 85' (pen.)	Stadium: Cashman Field; Attendance: 6,720; Referee: Daniel Gutierrez

August 22, 2018 25	Phoenix Rising FC	4–0	San Antonio FC	Scottsdale, Arizona
7:30pm	Cortez 18'; Asante 27'; Mala (yellow card) 39' (red card) 59'; Vega 45'; Forbes 64'	Report; Report	Rodriguez (yellow card) 45+4'	Stadium: Phoenix Rising FC Soccer Complex; Attendance: 5,017; Referee: Daniel Radford

August 25, 2018 26	Phoenix Rising FC	4–0	Colorado Springs Switchbacks	Scottsdale, Arizona
7:30pm	Awako 68'; Farrell 74'; Cortez 80'; Frater 90+4'	Report; Report	Burt (red card) 65'	Stadium: Phoenix Rising FC Soccer Complex; Attendance: 6,077; Referee: Sergii Demianchuk

September 5, 2018 27	Phoenix Rising FC	1–0	Rio Grande Valley Toros	Scottsdale, Arizona
7:30pm	Asante 61'	Report; Report	Greene (yellow card) 12'	Stadium: Phoenix Rising FC Soccer Complex; Attendance: 5,307; Referee: Jon Freemon

September 8, 2018 28	San Antonio FC	3–2	Phoenix Rising FC	San Antonio, Texas
7:30 P.M.	Hedrick 22'; Guzmán 33'; Presley (yellow card) 45+2'; Laing 50' (pen.); Lopez (yellow card) 89'; Murphy (yellow card) 90+3'	Report; Report	Cortez 15', 87'; Farrell (yellow card) 19'	Stadium: Toyota Field; Attendance: 6,534; Referee: Ramy Touchan

September 15, 2018 29	Seattle Sounders 2	0–1	Phoenix Rising FC	Tacoma, Washington
7:00pm	Ulysse (yellow card) 38'; Markey (yellow card) 62'; Hopeau (yellow card) 69'	Report; Report	Cortez 16'; Awako (yellow card) 89'	Stadium: Cheney Stadium; Attendance: 5,392; Referee: Greg Dopka

September 22, 2018 30	Colorado Springs Switchbacks	1–2	Phoenix Rising FC	Colorado Springs, Colorado
6:00pm	Jack (yellow card) 8'; Robinson 66'; També (yellow card) 71'	Report; Report	Farrell 22'; Lambert 43'; Awako (yellow card) 63'; Musa (yellow card) 78'; Woszczynski (yellow card) 90+5'	Stadium: Weidner Field; Attendance: 4,871; Referee: Josh Willens

September 29, 2018 31	Phoenix Rising FC	2–0	Saint Louis FC	Scottsdale, Arizona
7:30pm	Forbes 82'; Cortez 90+2'	Report; Report		Stadium: Phoenix Rising FC Soccer Complex; Attendance: 6,377; Referee: Farhad Dadkho

October 6, 2018 32	Phoenix Rising FC	0–0	Reno 1868 FC	Scottsdale, Arizona
7:30pm		Report; Report		Stadium: Phoenix Rising FC Soccer Complex; Attendance: 6,151; Referee: Daniel Gutierrez

October 10, 2018 33	Las Vegas Lights	5–2	Phoenix Rising FC	Las Vegas, Nevada
8:00pm	García 29' (pen.); Huiqui (yellow card) 41'; Íñigo (yellow card) 66'; Garduño 71'; Mendiola 74'; Alvarez 79'; Ochoa 84'; Thomas (yellow card) 90+2'	Report; Report	Fernandez 2'; Vega 43' (pen.); Vásquez (yellow card) 67'	Stadium: Cashman Field; Attendance: 5,929; Referee: Joseph Dickerson

October 13, 2018 34	Phoenix Rising FC	0–1	Portland Timbers 2	Scottsdale, Arizona
7:30pm	Mala (yellow card) 45+3'; Drogba (yellow card) 89'	Report; Report	Barmby (yellow card) 34'; Williams 85'	Stadium: Phoenix Rising FC Soccer Complex; Attendance: 7,289; Referee: Lorant Varga

=== USL Playoffs ===
==== Conference Playoffs ====
October 19, 2018 Quarterfinals	Phoenix Rising FC	3–0	Portland Timbers 2	Scottsdale, Arizona
7:30 pm MST	Drogba 28'; Johnson 62'; Asante 90'	Report; Report	Zambrano (yellow card) 40'; Hanson (yellow card) 84'; Diz Pe (red card) 90+5'	Stadium: Phoenix Rising FC Soccer Complex; Attendance: 7,511; Referee: Rubiel Vazquez

October 26, 2018 Semifinals	Phoenix Rising FC	4–2	Swope Park Rangers	Scottsdale, Arizona
7:30 pm MST	Johnson 22'; Drogba (yellow card) 29' (goal) 90+4'; Cortez 36'; Lambert 48'	Report; Report	Blackwood 26'; Barry 33'; Akhmatov (yellow card) 49'	Stadium: Phoenix Rising FC Soccer Complex; Attendance: 7,707; Referee: Guido Gonzales Jr.

November 3, 2018 Finals	Orange County SC	1–2	Phoenix Rising FC	Irvine, California
7:00 pm MST	Chaplow (yellow card) 47'; Hashimoto 82'	Report	Cortez 2'; Drogba 73'; Forbes (yellow card) 90+7'	Stadium: Championship Soccer Stadium; Attendance: 5,189; Referee: Tim Ford

==== USL Championship ====
November 8, 2018 Final	Louisville City FC	1–0	Phoenix Rising FC	Louisville, Kentucky
8:00 PM EST	Smith (yellow card) 45'; Spencer 62' (yellow card) 90+1'; Ranjitsingh (yellow card) 90+3'	Report; Report	Farrell (yellow card) 39'; Drogba (yellow card) 73'; Lambert (yellow card) 85'	Stadium: Lynn Stadium; Attendance: 7,025; Referee: Joseph Dickerson

=== Western Conference standings ===
Pos	Team	Pld	W	D	L	GF	GA	GD	Pts	Qualification
1	Orange County SC	34	20	6	8	70	40	+30	66	Conference Playoffs
2	Sacramento Republic	34	19	8	7	47	32	+15	65	Conference Playoffs
3	Phoenix Rising FC	34	19	6	9	63	38	+25	63	Conference Playoffs
4	Real Monarchs	34	19	3	12	55	47	+8	60	Conference Playoffs
5	Reno 1868 FC	34	16	11	7	56	38	+18	59	Conference Playoffs

Source: 2018 USL standings
Rules for classification: 1) total wins; 2) total goal differential; 3) total goals scored; 4) points earned against top four Conference finishers; 5) disciplinary points; 6) coin toss or drawing of lots

== U.S. Open Cup ==
May 16, 2018 Second Round	Sporting AZ FC	1–1 (a.e.t.) (5–4 p)	Phoenix Rising FC	Chandler, Arizona
7:30 PM MST	Arrubla 67'; Kishimoto (yellow card) 88'	Report; Report	Cortez 64'	Stadium: Chandler-Gilbert Community College; Referee: Paul Nothman
	Penalties
	Flood (penalty scored); Vulovich (penalty scored); LaMarca (penalty scored); Guse (penalty scored); Paul (penalty missed); Kishimoto (penalty scored)		(penalty missed) Cortez; (penalty scored) Johnson; (penalty scored) Frater; (penalty scored) Awako; (penalty scored) Dia; (penalty missed) Wakasa

== Statistics ==
(regular-season & Playoffs)

#	Pos.	Name	GP	GS	Min.	Goals	Assists	A yellow rectangle, denoting the yellow penalty card shown to a player being cautioned	A red rectangle, denoting the red penalty card shown to a player being sent off
9	FW	(United States) Chris Cortez	33	25	2232	19	5	1	0
20	FW	(Ghana) Solomon Asante	36	35	3042	14	9	3	0
14	FW	(Jamaica) Jason Johnson	33	26	2331	9	2	3	0
11	FW	(Ivory Coast) Didier Drogba	12	11	980	7	2	4	0
15	DF	(United States) Joe Farrell	26	24	2225	4	0	3	0
27	MF	(Jamaica) Kevon Lambert	32	31	2776	3	4	4	2
7	FW	(Turks and Caicos Islands) Billy Forbes	24	11	1100	3	2	1	0
51	FW	(Jamaica) Kevaughn Frater	21	7	815	3	1	0	0
8	MF	(Peru) Collin Fernandez	21	17	1428	2	3	2	0
23	MF	(United States) Devin Vega	12	7	690	2	1	1	0
17	MF	(Canada) Alessandro Riggi	14	4	342	2	5	1	0
4	DF	(United States) Mike da Fonte	31	30	2699	1	0	5	0
10	MF	(Ghana) Gladson Awako	30	23	1833	1	5	4	1
3	DF	(United States) Kody Wakasa	13	11	938	1	1	2	1
13	DF	(United States) Amadou Dia	35	35	3086	0	3	2	1
41	MF	(New Zealand) James Musa	26	24	2126	0	1	7	0
2	DF	(Ivory Coast) Doueugui Mala	16	15	1295	0	0	6	1
5	DF	(United States) Saad Abdul-Salaam	13	13	1134	0	1	0	0
32	DF	(United States) Devante Dubose	15	13	1093	0	1	2	0
77	DF	(United States) Tristan Blackmon	8	8	720	0	0	0	0
6	MF	(United States) Evan Waldrep	12	3	375	0	1	1	0
24	FW	(United States) Shaft Brewer Jr.	10	3	302	0	0	0	0
25	DF	(United States) Victor Vásquez	3	3	260	0	0	1	0
21	MF	(Canada) Luca Ricci	4	1	124	0	1	0	0
18	FW	(United States) Joshua Perez	1	0	28	0	0	0	0

- One Own Goal scored vs Real Monarchs

=== Goalkeepers ===
#	Name	GP	GS	Min.	SV	GA	GAA	SO	A yellow rectangle, denoting the yellow penalty card shown to a player being cautioned	A red rectangle, denoting the red penalty card shown to a player being sent off
1	(United States) Carl Woszczynski	30	29	2633	94	29	0.990	13	5	0
28	(United States) Zac Lubin	9	9	787	16	13	1.494	3	0	0

== Transfers ==
=== Loan in ===
Start date	End date	Position	No.	Player	From club
January 29, 2018	December 31, 2018	Forward	51	(Jamaica) Kevaughn Frater	(Jamaica) Harbour View
February 2, 2018	End of Season	Midfielder	21	(Canada) Luca Ricci	(Canada) Montreal Impact
February 10, 2018	End of Season	Defender	4	(United States) Mike da Fonte	(United States) Colorado Rapids
August 13, 2018	November 30, 2018	Defender	5	(United States) Saad Abdul-Salaam	(United States) New York City FC
August 15, 2018	End of Season	Defender	77	(United States) Tristan Blackmon	(United States) Los Angeles FC
August 17, 2018	End of Season	Forward	24	(United States) Shaft Brewer Jr.	(United States) Los Angeles FC
September 4, 2018	End of Season	Forward	18	(United States) Joshua Pérez	(United States) Los Angeles FC

=== Loan out ===
Start date	End date	Position	No.	Player	To club
June 30, 2018	August 17, 2018	Goalkeeper	28	(United States) Zac Lubin	(United States) Seattle Sounders FC

== See also ==
- 2018 in American soccer
- 2018 USL season
- Phoenix Rising FC
