= 2019–20 Oakland Roots SC season =

American soccer club season

Oakland Roots SC
2019–20 NISA season
- Chairman: Steven Aldrich
- Head coach: Paul Bravo (until 31st Oct.); Jordan Ferrell (since 3rd Dec.)
- Stadium: Laney College; Oakland, CA
- NISA: Fall, West Coast Conf.: 4th Spring: 1st
- Playoffs: Fall: DNQ; Spring: N/A
- U.S. Open Cup: Cancelled
- Top goalscorer: League: Jack McInerney (8); All: Jack McInerney (8)
- Highest home attendance: 5,723 (October 19 vs. Los Angeles)
- Lowest home attendance: 4,556 (August 31 vs. Cal United)
- Average home league attendance: 5,189
- Biggest win: 2–1 (March 7 vs. Michigan)
- Biggest defeat: 3–4 (September 28 vs. San Diego)

The 2019–20 Oakland Roots SC season was the club's first ever and its first in the newly created National Independent Soccer Association (NISA), a newly established third division soccer league in the United States.

== Overview ==
Oakland Roots announced on June 27, 2019 that the team would apply to join NISA after previously announcing it would take part in the NPSL Members Cup. a tournament put on by the National Premier Soccer League as a precursor to a proposed professional league in 2020. In August, the team was announced into the league along with Detroit City FC and Chattanooga FC. Unlike the other two teams, the Roots were announced as part of the Fall season and took part as members of the West Coast Conference.

On December 11, NISA announced the Oakland, Detroit, Chattanooga, and Michigan Stars FC had all been approved by the U.S. Soccer Board of Directors.

Paul Bravo was announced as the Roots' first head coach on May 9, 2019. On October 31, following the fall season, the club announced they and Bravo had mutually parted ways. Assistant coach Jordan Ferrell was named as interim head coach and later, on December 3, officially named as the new head coach. The team won its first NISA match on March 7, 2020, 2–1, at home against Michigan Stars FC.

The team played two friendly matches against Mexican professional teams early in the season, falling to Liga MX side FC Juárez in early September and beating second division side Club Atlético Zacatepec with both games selling out.

On April 27, 2020, following a stoppage of play and subsequent extension due to the COVID-19 pandemic, NISA announced the cancellation of the 2020 Spring season.

== Roster ==
=== Players ===
As of April 24, 2020

No.	Position	Nation	Player
1	GK	USA	Christian Herrera
2	DF	USA	Daniel Navarro
3	DF	LBR	Wilfred Williams
4	DF	CIV	Doueugui Mala
5	DF	CAN	Nana Attakora
06	FW	USA	Matthew Fondy
8	MF	USA	Angel Heredia
9	FW	USA	Jack McInerney
11	FW	USA	Tristan Bowen
12	MF	USA	Peter Pearson
13	DF	ITA	Francesco Tiozzo
15	MF	SEN	Khadim Seye
16	MF	IRL	Niall Irwin
17	MF	COL	David Ochoa
19	FW	USA	Josiah Romero
22	FW	USA	Alex Garuba
24	DF	USA	Nikolai Littleton
27	FW	MEX	Julio Cervantes
32	MF	COL	Manny González
33	DF	USA	Robert Hines II
44	MF	COD	Ariel Mbumba
47	GK	USA	Taylor Bailey
49	DF	USA	Tarn Weir
50	DF	USA	David Abidor
90	GK	USA	Kevin Gonzalez
91	MF	ERI	Yohannes Harish
98	MF	USA	Jonathan Orozco

=== Staff ===
- (United States) Jordan Ferrell – Head coach
- (Croatia) Dario Pot – Assistant coach
- (Japan) Yuta Tanaka – Strength and conditioning coach

== Transfers ==
=== In ===
#	Pos.	Player	Signed from	Details	Date	Source
20	MF	(United States) Angel Heredia	(United States) FC Tucson	Free transfer	August 21, 2018 (Note: Signed initially to non-professional contracts; later made professional for 2020 season.)	
14	FW	(United States) Jesus Maldonado	(United States) CD Aguiluchos USA	Free transfer	September 11, 2018	
90	GK	(United States) Kevin Gonzales	(United States) CD Aguiluchos USA	Free transfer	September 11, 2018	
24	MF	(United States) Nikolai Littleton	(United States) San Francisco City FC	Free transfer	September 12, 2018	
6	MF	(Republic of Ireland) Niall Irwin	Unattached	Free transfer	September 14, 2018	
33	DF	(United States) Robert Hines II	(United States) San Francisco City FC	Free transfer	September 14, 2018	
67	DF	(United States) Devante Dubose	(United States) Phoenix Rising FC	Free transfer	February 19, 2019 (Note: First professional signing.)	
91	FW	(Eritrea) Yohannes Harish	(United States) San Francisco Glens SC	Free transfer	March 18, 2019	
27	FW	(Mexico) Julio Cervantes	Unattached	Free transfer	March 18, 2019	
10	FW	(United States) Benji Joya	(Mexico) Irapuato F.C.	Free transfer	April 25, 2019	
5	DF	(Honduras) Víctor Bernárdez	Unattached	Free transfer	June 14, 2019	
23	DF	(Japan) Satoshi Chaffin	(United States) Seattle Sounders FC U-23	Free transfer	July 3, 2019	
7	FW	(Sierra Leone) Dembakwi Yomba	(United States) Reno 1868 FC	Free transfer	July 5, 2019	
17	MF	(Mexico) Octavio Guzmán	(United States) CD Aguiluchos USA	Free transfer	July 5, 2019	
1	GK	(United States) Larry Jackson	(United States) Fresno FC	Free transfer	July 15, 2019	
19	DF	(Mexico) Ricardo Guerra	Unattached	Free transfer	July 19, 2019	
21	MF	(United States) Ryan Masch	Unattached	Free transfer	July 19, 2019	
28	DF	(United States) Eric Gonzalez	(United States) Las Vegas Lights FC	Free transfer	July 19, 2019	
9	FW	(United States) Jack McInerney	(United States) Indy Eleven	Free transfer	July 24, 2019	
13	DF	(United States) Chris Christian	(United States) San Antonio FC	Free transfer	August 16, 2019	
4	DF	(Israel) Nadeer Ghantous	(United States) Cal Poly Pomona Broncos	Free transfer	August 17, 2019	
2	DF	(United States) David Chavez	Unattached	Free transfer	—	
7	FW	(The Gambia) Salifu Jatta	(United States) Corpus Christi FC	Free transfer	—	
11	FW	(United States) Dylan Autran	(Norway) Asker Fotball	Free transfer	—	
15	MF	(Senegal) Khadim Seye	(United States) ASC San Diego	Free transfer	—	
44	MF	(Democratic Republic of the Congo) Ariel Mbumba	Unattached	Free transfer	—	
11	FW	(United States) Tristan Bowen	Unattached	Free transfer	January 8, 2020	
06	FW	(United States) Matthew Fondy	(United States) The Olympic Club	Free transfer	January 10, 2020	
12	MF	(United States) Peter Pearson	(United States) Tormenta FC	Free transfer	January 28, 2020	
22	MF	(United States) Alex Garuba	(United States) Des Moines Menace	Free transfer	January 28, 2020	
17	MF	(Colombia) David Ochoa	(United States) Miami United FC	Free transfer	January 30, 2020	
32	MF	(Colombia) Manny González	(United States) Tulsa Roughnecks	Free transfer	January 30, 2020	
98	MF	(United States) Jonathan Orozco	(United States) San Francisco State Gators	Free transfer	February 3, 2020	
5	DF	(Canada) Nana Attakora	(Canada) Ottawa Fury FC	Free transfer	February 5, 2020	
1	GK	(United States) Christian Herrera	(United States) Orlando City B	Free transfer	February 7, 2020	
2	DF	(United States) Daniel Navarro	(United States) El Paso Locomotive FC	Free transfer	February 7, 2020	
3	DF	(United States) Wilfred Williams	(United States) Orlando City B	Free transfer	February 7, 2020	
19	FW	(United States) Josiah Romero	(United States) Holy Names Hawks	Free transfer	February 11, 2020	
4	DF	(Ivory Coast) Doueugui Mala	(United States) Phoenix Rising FC	Free transfer	February 13, 2020	
13	DF	(Italy) Francesco Tiozzo	(United States) Portland Pilots	Free transfer	February 13, 2020	
50	DF	(United States) David Abidor	(Israel) Hapoel Bnei Lod F.C.	Free transfer	February 13, 2020	
47	GK	(United States) Taylor Bailey	(United States) CCSF Rams	Free transfer	February 14, 2020	
7	FW	(Honduras) Darwin Espinal	(United States) New York Cosmos	Loan for NISA Spring Season	February 18, 2020	
49	DF	(United States) Tarn Weir	(Greece) Panthiraikos F.C.	Free transfer	April 24, 2020	

=== Out ===
#	Pos.	Player	Signed to	Details	Date	Source
67	DF	(United States) Devante Dubose	(United States) Richmond Kickers	Free transfer	December 12, 2019	
1	GK	(United States) Larry Jackson	Unattached	Not retained	December 17, 2019	
2	DF	(United States) David Chavez	Unattached	Not retained	December 17, 2019	
4	DF	(Israel) Nadeer Ghantous	Unattached	Not retained	December 17, 2019	
5	DF	(Honduras) Víctor Bernárdez	Unattached	Not retained	December 17, 2019	
7	FW	(Sierra Leone) Dembakwi Yomba	Unattached	Not retained	December 17, 2019	
8	MF	(United States) Andres Jimenez	Unattached	Not retained	December 17, 2019	
11	FW	(United States) Dylan Autran	Unattached	Not retained	December 17, 2019	
13	DF	(United States) Chris Christian	Unattached	Not retained	December 17, 2019	
17	MF	(Mexico) Octavio Guzmán	Unattached	Not retained	December 17, 2019	
21	MF	(United States) Ryan Masch	Unattached	Not retained	December 17, 2019	
25	GK	(United States) Jairo Zermeno	Unattached	Not retained	December 17, 2019	
28	DF	(United States) Eric Gonzalez	Unattached	Not retained	December 17, 2019	
7	FW	(The Gambia) Salifu Jatta	Unattached	Released	—	
14	FW	(United States) Jesus Maldonado	Unattached	Released	—	
19	DF	(Mexico) Ricardo Guerra	Unattached	Released	—	
23	DF	(Japan) Satoshi Chaffin	Unattached	Released	—	
7	FW	(Honduras) Darwin Espinal	New York Cosmos	Loan Terminated	March 5, 2020	
10	MF	(United States) Benji Joya	Unattached	Released	April 16, 2020	

== Friendlies ==
September 8, 2019 Friendly	Oakland Roots SC	2–4	(Mexico) FC Juárez	Oakland, California
5:00 p.m.	Seye (yellow card) 7'; Joya 27'; Masch 50'	Report	Rolán 2', 9', 43', (yellow card) 24'; Lezcano 11'	Stadium: Laney College

October 13, 2019 Friendly	Oakland Roots SC	2–0	(Mexico) Club Atlético Zacatepec	Oakland, California
5:00 p.m.	McInerney 8', (yellow card) 36'; Guzmán 46'	Report	Sánchez (yellow card) 51'	Stadium: Laney College

January 25, 2020 Preseason	NorCal United FC (UPSL)	0–8	Oakland Roots SC	Vacaville, California
7:00 p.m.				Stadium: Will C. Wood High School

February 1, 2020 Preseason	Academica SC (NPSL)	3–1	Oakland Roots SC	Turlock, California
3:00 p.m.		Report		Stadium: Academica Field

February 8, 2020 Preseason	Reno 1868 FC (USLC)	3–0	Oakland Roots SC	Sparks, Nevada
4:30 p.m.	Gleadle; Kikanovic	Report		Stadium: Golden Eagle Sports complex

February 15, 2020 Preseason	LA Galaxy II (USLC)	0–1	Oakland Roots SC	Carson, California
10:00 a.m.				Stadium: Dignity Health Park

February 22, 2020 Preseason	Sacramento Republic (USLC)	2–1	Oakland Roots SC	Sacramento, California
3:00 p.m.	Mickelson 27'; Belmar 55' (pen.)	Report	Goal	Stadium: Cosumnes River College
Note: Closed door friendly

February 25, 2020 Preseason	JASA RWC (UPSL)	1–0	Oakland Roots SC	Redwood City, California
3:00 p.m.	(Second half)	Report		Stadium: Red Morton Park
Note: Friendly

== Competitions ==
=== NISA Fall season (Showcase) ===
==== Standings ====
Pos	Team	Pld	W	D	L	GF	GA	GD	Pts	Qualification
1	Los Angeles Force	6	3	2	1	8	7	+1	11	West Coast Championship
2	California United Strikers FC (O)	6	2	3	1	13	9	+4	9	West Coast Championship
3	San Diego 1904 FC	6	2	0	4	9	15	−6	6	
4	Oakland Roots SC	6	0	3	3	10	13	−3	3	

Source: NISAofficial.com
(O) Play-off winners

==== Results summary ====
Overall								Home						Away					
Pld	W	D	L	GF	GA	GD	Pts	W	D	L	GF	GA	GD	W	D	L	GF	GA	GD
6	0	3	3	10	13	−3	3	0	2	0	4	4	0	0	1	3	6	9	−3

Last updated: 26 October 2019.
Source: Match reports

==== Matches ====
August 31, 2019 1	Oakland Roots SC	3–3	California United Strikers FC	Oakland, California
7:00 p.m.	McInerney 20', 31', 43'; Gonzalez (yellow card) 54'; Joya (yellow card) 57'	Report; MyCujoo Broadcast	Klute 45', (yellow card) 90+1'; Villalobos 79'; Thierjung 88'	Stadium: Laney College; Attendance: 4,556

September 25, 2019 2	California United Strikers FC	1–1	Oakland Roots SC	Irvine, California
7:00 p.m.	Thierjung 4'; Ebert (Coach) (yellow card) 17'; Bryant (yellow card) 84'; Chingirian (Ast. Coach) (yellow card) 90+1'	Report; MyCujoo Broadcast	Masch (yellow card) 22'; Jimenez (yellow card) 27'; Chaffin 35'; Guzmán (yellow card) 55'; McInerney (yellow card) 80'	Stadium: Championship Soccer Stadium; Attendance: 1,025; Referee: Karen Callado

September 28, 2019 3	San Diego 1904 FC	4–3	Oakland Roots SC	San Diego, California
7:04 p.m	Garton 25', (yellow card) 83'; Blanco 29'; Ramirez Jr. 45+1'; Amaya 80' (pen.); Arreola (yellow card) 90+6'	MyCujoo Broadcast	Joya (yellow card) 7'; Autran (yellow card) 16'; Masch 38', 68'; Christian (red card) 48'; McInerney 90+2'	Stadium: SDCCU Stadium; Attendance: 2,536

October 5, 2019 4	Los Angeles Force	1–0	Oakland Roots SC	Whittier, California
7:00 p.m.	Amo (yellow card) 38'; Hernandez (yellow card) 59'; Ruiz (yellow card) 63'; Merlano 70', (yellow card) 90'	MyCujoo Broadcast	McInerney (yellow card) 23'; Seye (yellow card) 58'; Heredia (yellow card) 66'	Stadium: Rio Hondo Stadium; Attendance: 473

October 19, 2019 5	Oakland Roots SC	1–1	Los Angeles Force	Oakland, California
7:00 p.m.	Masch 34'; Seye (yellow card) 59'	Report	Merlano 8'	Stadium: Laney College; Attendance: 5,723

October 26, 2019 6	Miami FC	3–2	Oakland Roots SC	Miami, Florida
7:00 p.m.	González 11', 38'; Rozeboom (yellow card) 57'; Chin 90+3'	Report; MyCujoo Broadcast	Ghantous (yellow card) 24'; McInerney 43', 49'	Stadium: Riccardo Silva Stadium; Attendance: 891
Note: Due to Miami playing more than six games, this game was not counted towards its standings in the East Table but did count for Oakland in the West Table.

=== NISA Spring Season ===
Details for the 2020 NISA Spring season were announced January 27, 2020.

==== Standings ====
Pos	Team	Pld	W	D	L	GF	GA	GD	Pts	Qualification
1	Oakland Roots SC	2	1	1	0	3	2	+1	4	Playoffs
2	California United Strikers FC (Q)	2	1	1	0	1	0	+1	4	Playoffs
3	Detroit City FC	1	1	0	0	2	0	+2	3	Playoffs
4	Stumptown Athletic	2	0	2	0	3	3	0	2	Playoffs
5	San Diego 1904 FC	2	0	2	0	2	2	0	2	
6	Chattanooga FC	1	0	1	0	1	1	0	1	
7	Los Angeles Force	2	0	1	1	1	3	−2	1	
8	Michigan Stars FC	2	0	0	2	1	3	−2	0	

Updated to match(es) played on March 8, 2020. Source: NISAofficial.com
(Q) Qualified for the phase indicated

==== Results summary ====
Overall								Home						Away					
Pld	W	D	L	GF	GA	GD	Pts	W	D	L	GF	GA	GD	W	D	L	GF	GA	GD
2	1	1	0	3	2	+1	4	1	1	0	3	2	+1	0	0	0	0	0	0

Last updated: 7 March 2020.
Source: Match reports

==== Matches ====
February 29, 2020 1	Oakland Roots SC	1–1	Chattanooga FC	Oakland, California
5:10 p.m.	Hines II (red card) 41'; McInerney 90+3', (yellow card) 90+3'	MyCujoo Broadcast	McGrath 33', (yellow card) 42'; Lee (yellow card) 51'	Stadium: Laney College; Attendance: 5,603

March 7, 2020 2	Oakland Roots SC	2–1	Michigan Stars FC	Oakland, California
5:10 p.m.	Harish (yellow card) 16'; Littleton (yellow card) 45'; McInerney 75' (pen.); Garuba 82'; Attakora (yellow card) 88'	MyCujoo Broadcast	Mahic (yellow card) 12'; Schneider (yellow card) 63'; Ward 89'	Stadium: Laney College; Attendance: 4,873

March 21, 2020 3	Detroit City FC	P–P	Oakland Roots SC	Hamtramck, Michigan
7:00 p.m				Stadium: Keyworth Stadium
Note: On March 12, NISA announced that it would be suspending its season 30 days due to the COVID-19 pandemic

March 28, 2020 4	San Diego 1904 FC	P–P	Oakland Roots SC	San Diego, California
7:04 p.m.				Stadium: Lincoln High School
Note: On March 12, NISA announced that it would be suspending its season 30 days due to the COVID-19 pandemic

April 4, 2020 5	Oakland Roots SC	P–P	Detroit City FC	Oakland, California
5:10 p.m.				Stadium: Laney College
Note: On March 12, NISA announced that it would be suspending its season 30 days due to the COVID-19 pandemic

April 11, 2020 6	Oakland Roots SC	P–P	California United Strikers FC	Oakland, California
5:10 p.m.				Stadium: Laney College
Note: On March 30, NISA announced that it would be extending its suspension of play to May 10 in accordance with CDC guidelines for COVID-19

April 25, 2020 7	Stumptown Athletic	P–P	Oakland Roots SC	Matthews, North Carolina
7:04 p.m.				Stadium: Sportsplex at Matthews
Note: On March 30, NISA announced that it would be extending its suspension of play to May 10 in accordance with CDC guidelines for COVID-19

May 2, 2020 8	Michigan Stars FC	P–P	Oakland Roots SC	Pontiac, Michigan
7:00 p.m.				Stadium: Ultimate Soccer Arenas Outdoor Stadium
Note: On March 30, NISA announced that it would be extending its suspension of play to May 10 in accordance with CDC guidelines for COVID-19

May 9, 2020 9	Oakland Roots SC	P–P	Los Angeles Force	Oakland, California
7:00 p.m.				Stadium: Laney College
Note: On March 30, NISA announced that it would be extending its suspension of play to May 10 in accordance with CDC guidelines for COVID-19

May 16, 2020 10	Chattanooga FC	P–P	Oakland Roots SC	Chattanooga, Tennessee
7:30 p.m.				Stadium: Finley Stadium
Note: On April 28, NISA announced the cancellation of the 2020 Spring season due to COVID-19

May 23, 2020 11	Oakland Roots SC	P–P	Stumptown Athletic	Oakland, California
5:10 p.m.				Stadium: Laney College
Note: On April 28, NISA announced the cancellation of the 2020 Spring season due to COVID-19

May 30, 2020 12	Oakland Roots SC	P–P	San Diego 1904 FC	Oakland, California
5:10 p.m.				Stadium: Laney College
Note: On April 28, NISA announced the cancellation of the 2020 Spring season due to COVID-19

June 7, 2020 13	California United Strikers FC	P–P	Oakland Roots SC	Irvine, California
4:00 p.m.				Stadium: Championship Soccer Stadium
Note: On April 28, NISA announced the cancellation of the 2020 Spring season due to COVID-19

June 12, 2019 14	Los Angeles Force	P–P	Oakland Roots SC	Los Angeles, California
7:30 p.m.				Stadium: Jesse Owens Stadium
Note: On April 28, NISA announced the cancellation of the 2020 Spring season due to COVID-19

=== U.S. Open Cup ===
Oakland will enter the 2020 U.S. Open Cup with the rest of the National Independent Soccer Association teams in the Second Round. It was announced on 29 January that their first opponent would be USL Championship side Sacramento Republic FC.

April 8 Second round	Sacramento Republic FC (USLC) (California)	P–P	(California) Oakland Roots SC (NISA)	Sacramento, California
7:30 pm PDT				Stadium: Papa Murphy's Park
Note: On March 13, U.S. Soccer’s Open Cup Committee announced the tournament would be temporarily suspended due to the COVID-19 pandemic

== Squad statistics ==
As of Match played 7 March 2020

=== Appearances and goals ===
No.	Pos	Nat	Player	Total		Fall Season		Spring Season	
No.	Pos	Nat	Player	Apps	Goals	Apps	Goals	Apps	Goals
Goalkeepers
1	GK	(United States) USA	Christian Herrera	0	0	0	0	0	0
47	GK	(United States) USA	Taylor Bailey	2	0	0	0	2	0
90	GK	(United States) USA	Kevin Gonzalez	1	0	1	0	0	0
Defenders
2	DF	(United States) USA	Daniel Navarro	2	0	0	0	2	0
3	DF	(Liberia) LBR	Wilfred Williams	1	0	0	0	1	0
4	DF	(Ivory Coast) CIV	Doueugui Mala	0	0	0	0	0	0
5	DF	(Canada) CAN	Nana Attakora	2	0	0	0	2	0
13	DF	(Italy) ITA	Francesco Tiozzo	0	0	0	0	0	0
24	DF	(United States) USA	Nikolai Littleton	1	0	0	0	1	0
33	DF	(United States) USA	Robert Hines II	6	0	5	0	1	0
50	DF	(United States) USA	David Abidor	2	0	0	0	2	0
Midfielders
8	MF	(United States) USA	Angel Heredia	8	0	6	0	2	0
12	MF	(United States) USA	Peter Pearson	2	0	0	0	2	0
15	MF	(Senegal) SEN	Khadim Seye	6	0	5	0	1	0
16	MF	(Republic of Ireland) IRL	Niall Irwin	1	0	1	0	0	0
17	MF	(Colombia) COL	David Ochoa	0	0	0	0	0	0
32	MF	(Colombia) COL	Manny González	2	0	0	0	2	0
44	MF	(Democratic Republic of the Congo) COD	Ariel Mbumba	1	0	0	0	1	0
91	MF	(Eritrea) ERI	Yohannes Harish	2	0	0	0	2	0
98	MF	(United States) USA	Jonathan Orozco	0	0	0	0	0	0
Forwards
06	FW	(United States) USA	Matthew Fondy	2	0	0	0	2	0
9	FW	(United States) USA	Jack McInerney	8	8	6	6	2	2
11	FW	(United States) USA	Tristan Bowen	0	0	0	0	0	0
19	FW	(United States) USA	Josiah Romero	1	0	0	0	1	0
22	FW	(United States) USA	Alex Garuba	1	1	0	0	1	1
27	FW	(Mexico) MEX	Julio Cervantes	2	0	1	0	1	0
Left during season
1	GK	(United States) USA	Larry Jackson	3	0	3	0	-	-
2	DF	(United States) USA	David Chavez	4	0	4	0	-	-
4	DF	(Israel) ISR	Nadeer Ghantous	3	0	3	0	-	-
5	DF	(Honduras) HON	Víctor Bernárdez	2	0	2	0	-	-
7	FW	(Honduras) HON	Darwin Espinal	0	0	0	0	0	0
7	FW	(The Gambia) GAM	Salifu Jatta	2	0	2	0	-	-
7	FW	(Sierra Leone) SLE	Dembakwi Yomba	4	0	4	0	-	-
8	MF	(United States) USA	Andres Jimenez	3	0	3	0	-	-
10	MF	(United States) USA	Benji Joya	6	0	4	0	2	0
11	FW	(United States) USA	Dylan Autran	5	0	5	0	-	-
13	DF	(United States) USA	Chris Christian	5	0	5	0	-	-
14	FW	(Mexico) MEX	Jesus Maldonado	0	0	0	0	-	-
17	MF	(Mexico) MEX	Octavio Guzmán	5	0	5	0	-	-
19	DF	(Mexico) MEX	Ricardo Guerra	0	0	0	0	-	-
21	MF	(United States) USA	Ryan Masch	5	3	5	3	-	-
23	DF	(Japan) JPN	Satoshi Chaffin	5	1	5	1	-	-
25	GK	(United States) USA	Jairo Zermeno	2	0	2	0	-	-
28	DF	(United States) USA	Eric Gonzalez	5	0	5	0	-	-
67	FW	(United States) USA	Devante Dubose	3	0	3	0	-	-

=== Goal scorers ===
Place	Position	Nation	Number	Name	Fall Season	Spring Season	Total
1	FW	(United States)	9	Jack McInerney	6	2	8
2	MF	(United States)	21	Ryan Masch	3	-	3
3	FW	(United States)	22	Alex Garuba	-	1	1
3	DF	(Japan)	23	Satoshi Chaffin	1	-	1

=== Disciplinary record ===
Number	Nation	Position	Name	Fall Season		Spring Season		Total	
Number	Nation	Position	Name	Booked	Sent off (straight red)	Booked	Sent off (straight red)	Booked	Sent off (straight red)
4	(Israel)	DF	Nadeer Ghantous	1	0	-	-	1	0
5	(Canada)	DF	Nana Attakora	-	-	1	0	1	0
8	(United States)	MF	Angel Heredia	1	0	0	0	1	0
8	(United States)	MF	Andres Jimenez	1	0	-	-	1	0
9	(United States)	FW	Jack McInerney	2	0	1	0	3	0
10	(United States)	FW	Benji Joya	2	0	0	0	2	0
11	(United States)	FW	Dylan Autran	1	0	-	-	1	0
13	(United States)	DF	Chris Christian	0	1	-	-	0	1
15	(Senegal)	MF	Khadim Seye	2	0	0	0	2	0
17	(Mexico)	MF	Octavio Guzmán	1	0	-	-	1	0
21	(United States)	MF	Ryan Masch	1	0	-	-	1	0
24	(United States)	DF	Nikolai Littleton	0	0	1	0	1	0
28	(United States)	DF	Eric Gonzalez	1	0	-	-	1	0
33	(United States)	DF	Robert Hines II	0	0	0	1	0	1
91	(Eritrea)	MF	Yohannes Harish	0	0	1	0	1	0
