= Jordan Gibbons =

English footballer

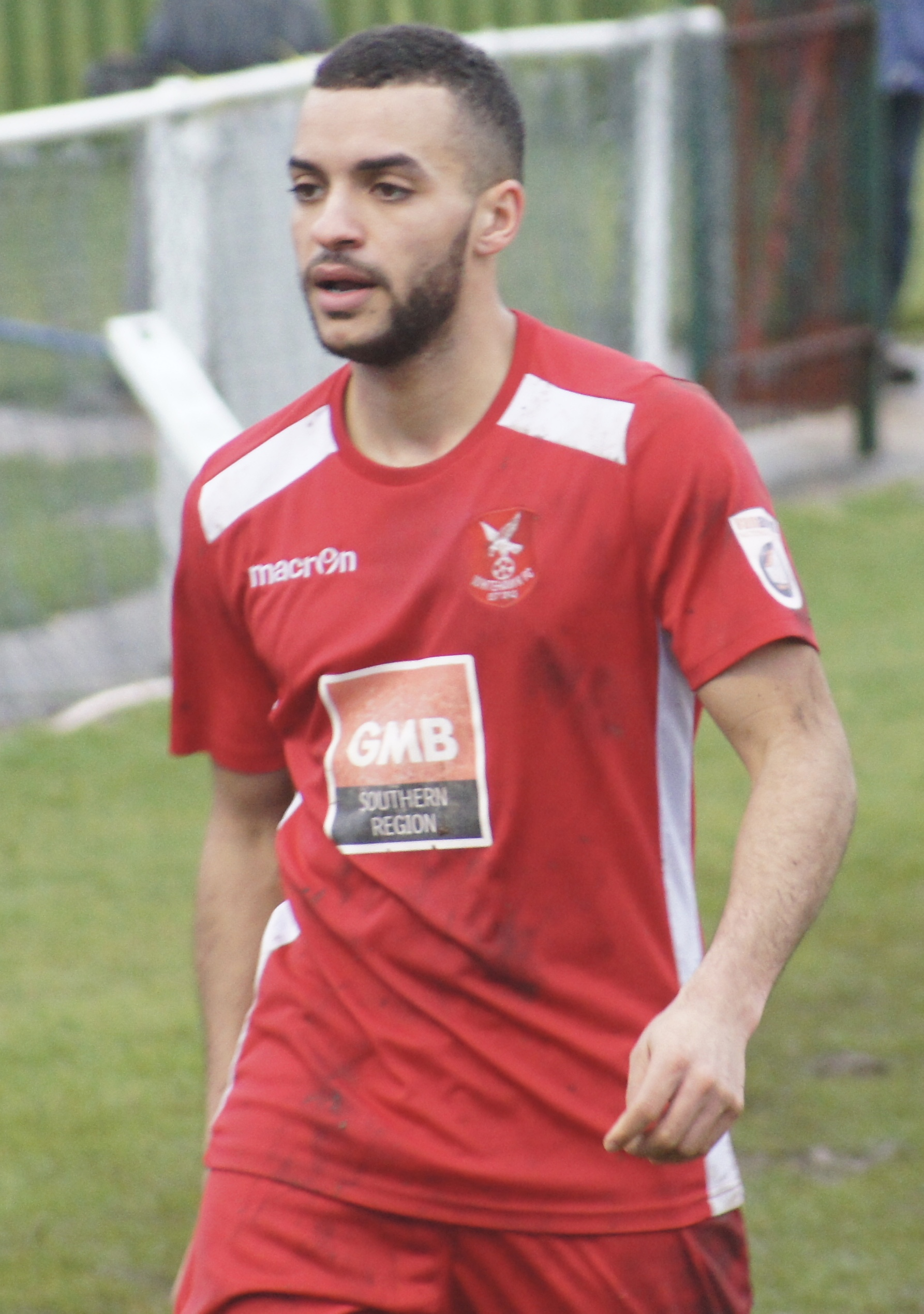
- Gibbons playing for Whitehawk in 2018

Personal information
- Full name: Jordan Leon Chidubem Gibbons
- Date of birth: 18 November 1993 (age 32)
- Place of birth: Bromley, England
- Height: 1.79 m (5 ft 10 1/2 in)
- Position: Defender

Team information
- Current team: Chesham United

Youth career
- 2008–2011: Queens Park Rangers

Senior career*
Years	Team	Apps	(Gls)
2011–2015	Queens Park Rangers	0	(0)
2013	→ Inverness Caledonian Thistle (loan)	1	(0)
2015–2016	Yeovil Town	3	(0)
2016	Hanwell Town	0	(0)
2016–2017	Wingate & Finchley	8	(0)
2017	Kingstonian	2	(0)
2017–2018	Phoenix Rising	7	(0)
2018	Whitehawk	9	(0)
2018–2019	Welling United	17	(0)
2019	Chelmsford City	1	(0)
2019	Whitehawk	1	(0)
2019	Dartford	6	(0)
2020	Whitehawk	2	(0)
2021	Wingate & Finchley	7	(0)
2021–	Chesham United	10	(0)
- * Club domestic league appearances and goals as of 16:24, 20 February 2022 (UTC)

Jordan Leon Chidubem Gibbons (born 18 November 1993) is an English footballer who plays as a defender for Chesham United.

== Club career ==
A product of Queens Park Rangers youth academy he was given professional contract in 2011. On 23 August 2011 he was an unused substitute against Rochdale. On 29 January 2013, Scottish Premier League team Inverness Caledonian Thistle signed him on loan until the end of the season. His signing to the club was followed by Charlie Taylor's loan arrival from Leeds United. In the next day he made his league debut against St Mirren in a 2–1 loss coming as an 89th-minute substitute for Aaron Doran.

Following his release from QPR, Gibbons signed for League Two side Yeovil Town on a one-year contract ahead of the 2015–16 season. He was released at the end of the 2015–16 season. Having been released by Yeovil, Gibbons called time on his professional football career having struggled with injury.

In November 2016, it was announced that Gibbons would return to football to join Isthmian League Premier Division side Wingate & Finchley. On 19 November 2016, Gibbons made his Wingate & Finchley debut in a 4–1 victory against Canvey Island, replacing Ola Williams in the 39th minute.

On 28 April 2017, after a spell with Kingstonian, Gibbons joined recently founded American side Phoenix Rising.

In March 2018 Gibbons signed for Brighton-based National League South side Whitehawk.

On 30 July 2019, Gibbons signed for Chelmsford City from Welling United, after spending the 2018–19 season with the latter. In August 2019, after a solitary appearance in a 4–1 defeat against Weymouth, Chelmsford assistant manager Nick Haycock confirmed the departure of Gibbons due to injury problems.

Gibbons re-signed for Whitehawk in October 2019 and made his second debut in a 2–1 defeat at Faversham Town on 5 October 2019, before moving to Dartford after one further cup appearance.

Ahead of the 2021–22 campaign, Gibbons returned to Wingate & Finchley, following a third spell back at Whitehawk in March 2020. In November 2021, he was on the move again, when he signed for Southern Football League Premier Division South side Chesham United, making his debut against Hendon.

== Career statistics ==
As of match played 8 February 2022

Appearances and goals by club, season and competition
Club	Season	League			National Cup		League Cup		Other		Total	
Club	Season	Division	Apps	Goals	Apps	Goals	Apps	Goals	Apps	Goals	Apps	Goals
Queens Park Rangers	2011–12	Premier League	0	0	0	0	0	0	—		0	0
Queens Park Rangers	2012–13	Premier League	0	0	0	0	0	0	—		0	0
Queens Park Rangers	2013–14	Championship	0	0	0	0	0	0	0	0	0	0
Queens Park Rangers	2014–15	Premier League	0	0	0	0	0	0	—		0	0
Queens Park Rangers	Total		0	0	0	0	0	0	0	0	0	0
Inverness Caledonian Thistle (loan)	2012–13	Scottish Premier League	1	0	1	0	0	0	—		2	0
Yeovil Town	2015–16	League Two	3	0	0	0	0	0	1 (Note: Appearance in the Football League Trophy)	0	4	0
Hanwell Town	2016–17	Southern League Division One Central	0	0	—		—		1 (Note: Appearance in the FA Trophy)	0	1	0
Wingate & Finchley	2016–17	Isthmian League Premier Division	8	0	—		—		—		8	0
Kingstonian	2016–17	Isthmian League Premier Division	2	0	—		—		—		2	0
Phoenix Rising	2017	United Soccer League	7	0	1	0	—		0	0	8	0
Whitehawk	2017–18	National League South	9	0	—		—		—		9	0
Welling United	2018–19	National League South	17	0	2	0	—		2 (Note: Appearance in the National League South play-offs)	0	21	0
Chelmsford City	2019–20	National League South	1	0	—		—		—		1	0
Whitehawk	2019–20	Isthmian League South East Division	1	0	—		—		1	0	2	0
Dartford	2019–20	National League South	6	0	1	0	—		—		7	0
Whitehawk	2019–20	Isthmian League South East Division	2	0	—		—		—		2	0
Wingate & Finchley	2021–22	Isthmian League Premier Division	7	0	4	0	—		1	0	12	0
Chesham United	2021–22	Southern League Premier Division South	10	0	—		—		—		10	0
Career total			75	0	5	0	0	0	6	0	86	0
