= Devin Vega =

Puerto Rican footballer

Personal information
- Full name: Devin David Vega
- Date of birth: December 11, 1998 (age 27)
- Place of birth: San Antonio, Texas, United States
- Height: 1.67 m (5 ft 6 in)
- Position: Attacking midfielder

Youth career
- 2015–2017: FC Dallas

Senior career*
Years	Team	Apps	(Gls)
2017	San Antonio FC	14	(3)
2018–2019	Phoenix Rising	15	(2)
2019	→ FC Tucson (loan)	5	(2)
2020	Real Monarchs	7	(0)
2023	Des Moines Menace	1	(0)

International career
2014	United States U17	1	(0)
2019–	Puerto Rico	8	(2)
- * Club domestic league appearances and goals as of October 5, 2020

Devin Vega (born December 11, 1998) is a footballer who plays as an attacking midfielder. Born in the mainland United States, he plays for the Puerto Rico national team.

== Career ==
Vega grew up in San Antonio, Texas, and played his youth career at the U.S. Soccer Federation's residency program and the FC Dallas Academy.

Vega signed with San Antonio FC on January 26, 2017. Vega scored his first professional goal on Tuesday April 25, 2017, against Seattle Sounders FC 2, slotting the ball into the back of the net in the 69th minute.

Vega signed with Phoenix Rising FC on December 13, 2017, for the 2018 season. Vega scored a goal against his old team in Phoenix's 4–0 win over San Antonio in 2018. Vega made one appearance with Phoenix Rising in the 2019 season before being placed on loan to USL Leage One Club, FC Tucson. For the 2020 season, Vega secured a contract with Real Monarchs. He was unsigned into the 2022 season. He later made appearances with USL League 2 club, Des Moines Menace.

== International career ==
Vega played for the United States national under-17 team in 2014 at the Aegean Cup. However, he was also eligible to play for the Puerto Rico national team and was called up in August 2019 for friendly matches. He made his debut in an exhibition match against Hartford Athletic. He was later called up in September for matches against Honduras and Guatemala.

=== International goals ===
Scores and results Puerto Rico's goal tally first.

No.	Date	Venue	Opponent	Score	Result	Competition
1.	19 November 2019	Juan Ramón Loubriel Stadium, Bayamón, Puerto Rico	Anguilla	3–0	3–0	2019–20 CONCACAF Nations League C
