= Jack McInerney =

American soccer player (born 1992)

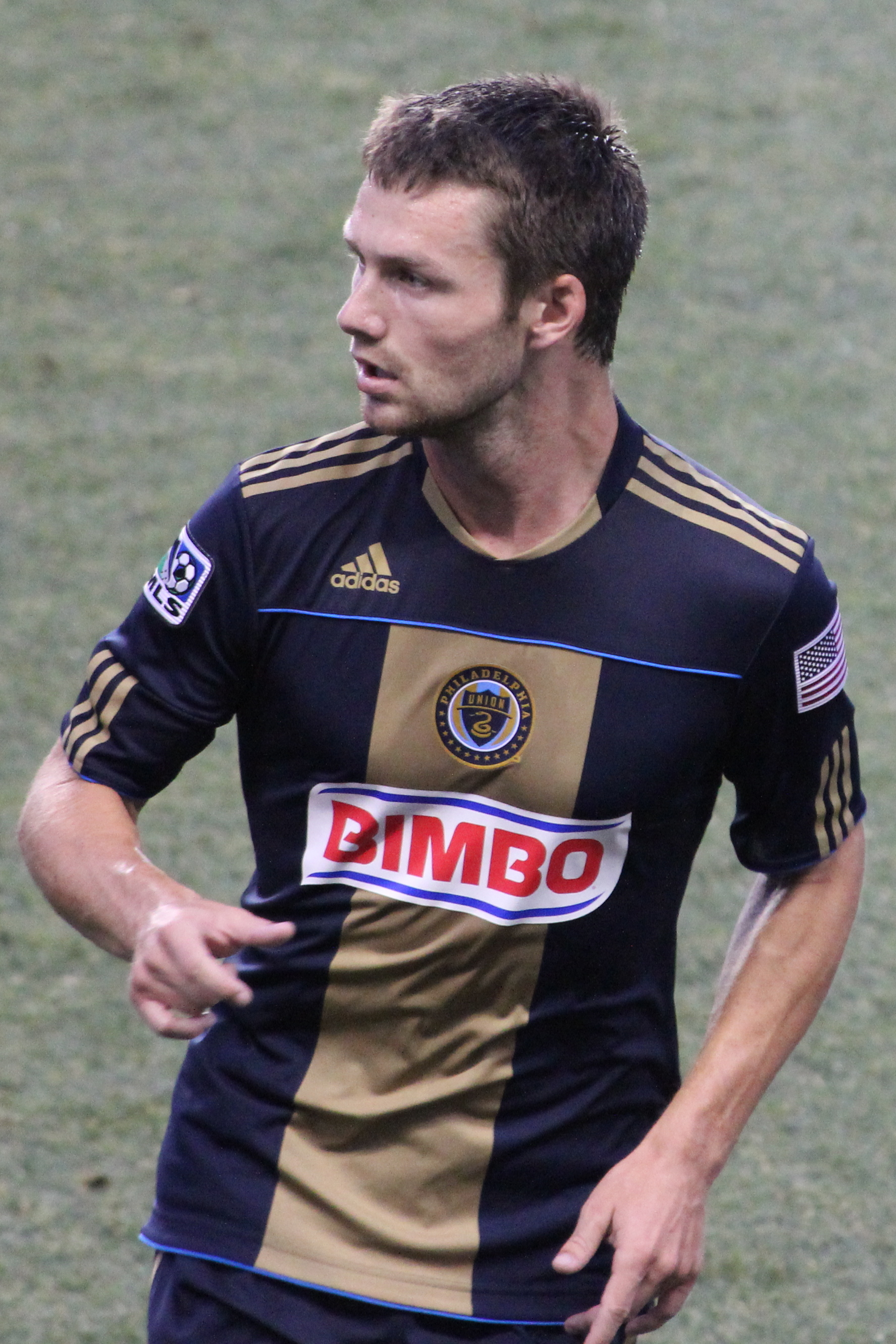

Personal information
- Full name: John Seamus McInerney
- Date of birth: August 5, 1992 (age 34)
- Place of birth: Chattanooga, Tennessee, United States
- Height: 5 ft 10 in (1.78 m)
- Position: Forward

Youth career
- 2004–2009: Cobb Futbol Club

Senior career*
Years	Team	Apps	(Gls)
2010–2014	Philadelphia Union	95	(25)
2010	→ Harrisburg City Islanders (loan)	1	(0)
2014–2015	Montreal Impact	43	(11)
2015	Columbus Crew SC	5	(2)
2016	Portland Timbers	24	(5)
2017	LA Galaxy	8	(0)
2018	Indy Eleven	30	(10)
2019–2020	Oakland Roots	10	(9)
2026	CS St-Laurent	2	(0)
2026–	FC Supra du Quebec	1	(0)

International career
2008–2009	United States U17	15	(11)
2010	United States U20	1	(1)
2011	United States U23	2	(0)
Medal record
Representing United States
Winner	CONCACAF Gold Cup	2013
Men's Soccer
- * Club domestic league appearances and goals as of September 20, 2026

John Seamus McInerney (born August 5, 1992) is an American professional soccer player who plays for FC Supra du Quebec in the Canadian Premier League.

== Early life ==
Born in Chattanooga, Tennessee, McInerney moved with his family to Colorado, Illinois, California, and Florida before finally settling in Alpharetta, Georgia before he entered the third grade. He graduated from Bradenton Preparatory High School in Bradenton, Florida, and played club soccer for the Cobb Futbol Club in Georgia. He was named the National Soccer Coaches Association of America National Youth Player of the Year for 2009, having already established a regional reputation as a member of the Georgia 1992 Boys Olympic Development Program.

== Club career ==
McInerney turned professional straight out of high school; he was drafted in the first round (7th overall) of the 2010 MLS SuperDraft by Philadelphia Union. He made his professional debut on March 25, in the opening game of the 2010 MLS season against Seattle Sounders FC. He scored his first professional goal on May 1 against the LA Galaxy.

McInerney also spent one match on loan with the Harrisburg City Islanders of the USL Second Division during the 2010 season.

In April 2014, McInerney was traded to the Montreal Impact in exchange for Andrew Wenger. During his first season with the Montreal Impact, McInerney grabbed his first professional silverware scoring three goals and winning the Canadian Championship golden boot as Montreal claimed the Canadian title.

McInerney scored the first goal in Montreal's 4–2 loss in the 2014–15 CONCACAF Champions League semi-final second leg. However, because they won the opening leg at home 2–0, they advanced to the final on away goals. McInerney scored in the second leg of the final against Club América, however, Montreal lost the game 4–2 and 5–3 on aggregate.

In August 2015, McInerney was traded to the Columbus Crew SC in exchange for a 2nd round pick in the 2016 MLS SuperDraft after the Impact signed Didier Drogba. He ranks second in MLS history in goals scored by the age of 23 with 36.

Portland Timbers acquired McInerney from the Crew In January 2016 in exchange for targeted and general allocation money.

McInerney was acquired by LA Galaxy on April 18, 2017, after having been waived by Portland at the end of the 2016 season.

Indy Eleven announced on February 19, 2018, the signing of McInerney for the 2018 season.

On July 24, 2019, McInerney joined NISA expansion side Oakland Roots SC.

In 2020, McInerney retired from professional soccer and moved back to Montreal with his family. He began coaching his daughter's youth team at CS St-Laurent and continued to play in recreation leagues, where he was spotted by members of FC Supra du Québec of the Canadian Premier League in 2026. He then began training with the professional side, and joined up with the senior CS St-Laurent side in LS Pro to get back to speed. In September 2026, he signed with FC Supra du Québec for the remainder of the 2026 season.

== International career ==
McInerney was a member of the U.S. Under 15 National Team during 2006 and 2007, and as a member of the U.S. Under-17 Team he scored five goals in qualifiers for the U-17 World Cup, where head coach Wilmer Cabrera complimented the player, calling him "far and away the best player." McInerney went on to score two goals at the 2009 FIFA U-17 World Cup. After scoring 10 goals in the first 14 matches of the 2013 Major League Soccer season, McInerney was named to the preliminary 35-man roster for the 2013 CONCACAF Gold Cup by Jürgen Klinsmann. McInerney was then named to the final 23-man roster for the tournament, giving him his first call-up to the senior side.

== Career statistics ==
As of October 2, 2020

Club	Season	League			Playoffs (Note: Appearances in the MLS Cup Playoffs, USL Cup, and NISA Playoffs)		Cup (Note: Includes the U.S. Open Cup and Canadian Championship)		Continental		Total	
Club	Season	Division	Apps	Goals	Apps	Goals	Apps	Goals	Apps	Goals	Apps	Goals
Philadelphia Union	2010	Major League Soccer	17	3	–		1	0	–		18	3
Philadelphia Union	2011	Major League Soccer	18	1	2	0	1	0	–		21	1
Philadelphia Union	2012	Major League Soccer	25	8	–		2	1	–		27	9
Philadelphia Union	2013	Major League Soccer	31	12	–		2	2	–		33	14
Philadelphia Union	2014	Major League Soccer	4	1	–		0	0	–		4	1
Philadelphia Union	Total		95	25	2	0	6	3	0	0	103	28
Harrisburg City Islanders (loan)	2010	USL Second Division	1	0	–		0	0	–		1	0
Montreal Impact	2014	Major League Soccer	26	7	–		4	3	2	1	32	11
Montreal Impact	2015	Major League Soccer	17	4	0	0	2	1	3	2	22	7
Montreal Impact	Total		43	11	0	0	6	4	5	3	54	18
Columbus Crew SC	2015	Major League Soccer	5	2	2	0	0	0	–		7	2
Portland Timbers	2016	Major League Soccer	24	5	–		2	1	4	2	30	8
LA Galaxy	2017	Major League Soccer	8	0	–		3	0	–		11	0
Indy Eleven	2018	USL	30	10	1	0	1	0	–		32	10
Oakland Roots	2019–20	NISA	8	8	0	0	0	0	–		8	8
Oakland Roots	2020–21	NISA	2	1	5	1	0	0	–		7	2
Oakland Roots	Total		10	9	5	1	0	0	0	0	15	10
Career total			216	62	10	1	18	8	9	5	253	76

== Honors ==
Montreal Impact

- Canadian Championship: 2014

United States

- CONCACAF Gold Cup: 2013

Individual

- Canadian Championship Golden Boot: 2014
