= A. J. Gray =

Canadian soccer player (born 1988)

Personal information
- Full name: Andrew Richard Gray Jr.
- Date of birth: April 12, 1988 (age 38)
- Place of birth: Mississauga, Ontario, Canada
- Height: 1.84 m (6 ft 0 in)
- Position: Winger

Youth career
- 2007: Toronto FC

College career
Years	Team	Apps	(Gls)
2008–2009	Sheridan		
2010–2011	St. Francis Xavier		

Senior career*
Years	Team	Apps	(Gls)
2011	Victoria Highlanders		
2012	Juventus IF		
2013	Ventura County Fusion		
2014	OPS	9	(2)
2015	FC Haka	21	(0)
2016	Orange County Blues	7	(0)
2017	Phoenix Rising	24	(1)
2019	Vaughan Azzurri	7	(0)
Total		68	(3)

International career
2005	Canada U17	6	(1)
2007	Canada U20	10	(0)
- * Club domestic league appearances and goals

Andrew Richard Gray Jr. (born April 12, 1988) is a Canadian retired soccer player who played as a winger.

== Career ==
Gray began his career in Sweden with fifth-tier side Juventus IF in 2012. He had spells with Ventura County Fusion, OPS and FC Haka, before signing with United Soccer League side Orange County Blues on August 4, 2016.
