= Eric Gonzalez (soccer) =

American association football player

Personal information
- Full name: Eric Noel Gonzalez
- Date of birth: March 24, 1994 (age 32)
- Place of birth: Corona, California, United States
- Height: 5 ft 9 in (1.75 m)
- Position: Midfielder

Team information
- Current team: Temecula FC

Youth career
- 2011–2012: Chivas USA
- 2010–2011: LA Galaxy

College career
Years	Team	Apps	(Gls)
2012–2015	UC Riverside Highlanders	70	(1)

Senior career*
Years	Team	Apps	(Gls)
2016–2017	SoCal SC		
2018	Cal FC		
2019	Las Vegas Lights	6	(0)
2019	Oakland Roots	4	(0)
2021–	Temecula FC	0	(0)

International career
2009–2010	United States U17		
- * Club domestic league appearances and goals as of February 12, 2021

Eric Gonzalez (born March 24, 1994) is an American soccer player who currently plays for Temecula FC in the National Premier Soccer League.

== Youth, amateur, and college career ==
Gonzalez attended Santiago High School in Corona, California. In 2011, he helped lead Corona to an undefeated season and the squad won the Big VIII League Title — a first for Santiago High School. In 2011 he was selected as Press Enterprise Player of the Year.

Gonzalez's youth career includes playing in the U.S. Soccer Development Academy with the LA Galaxy and Chivas USA academies. In 2008–09, he made 24 appearances for the LA Galaxy U15/U16 squad and helped the club win the first USSDA U-16 Championship. In 2009 he was part of the U17 US National team located in Bradenton, Florida.

Eric Gonzalez played four years of college soccer for the University of California, Riverside soccer team. While at UCR Eric he played 70 matches (started 57) and obtained the third-most assists. In 2014 Eric helped win the first ever NCAA Big West Title.

In February 2021, Gonzalez joined National Premier Soccer League club Temecula FC.

== Professional ==
In January 2019, Gonzalez signed with Las Vegas Lights FC in the USL Championship.

Gonzalez joined the Oakland Roots in July 2019.
