= Felipe Sousa =

Brazilian footballer (born 1999)

Personal information
- Full name: Felipe Fernandes Sousa
- Date of birth: 6 May 1999 (age 27)
- Place of birth: Patos de Minas, Brazil
- Position: Forward

Team information
- Current team: Gama

Youth career
- –2018: URT
- 2018: XV de Piracicaba
- 2018–2019: Atlético Mineiro

Senior career*
Years	Team	Apps	(Gls)
2018	URT	3	(0)
2019	Atlético Mineiro	0	(0)
2020–	Gama	0	(0)
- * Club domestic league appearances and goals as of 17:17, 12 November 2019 (UTC)

Felipe Fernandes Sousa (born 6 May 1999) is a Brazilian footballer who plays as a forward for Gama.

== Career statistics ==
=== Club ===
As of 12 November 2019.

Club	Season	League			State league		Cup		Continental		Other		Total	
Club	Season	Division	Apps	Goals	Apps	Goals	Apps	Goals	Apps	Goals	Apps	Goals	Apps	Goals
URT	2018	Série D	2	0	0	0	0	0	–		0	0	2	0
Atlético Mineiro	2019	Série A	0	0	1 (Note: Appearances in the Campeonato Mineiro)	0	0	0	0	0	0	0	1	0
Career total			2	0	1	0	0	0	0	0	0	0	3	0
