= J. J. Greer =

American soccer player

Personal information
- Full name: Jarvis Greer, Jr.
- Date of birth: 4 February 1991 (age 35)
- Place of birth: Memphis, Tennessee, United States
- Height: 1.83 m (6 ft 0 in)
- Position: Defender

Youth career
- 2009–2013: Memphis Tigers

Senior career*
Years	Team	Apps	(Gls)
2010–2011	Mississippi Brilla	12	(0)
2013	Portland Timbers U23s	12	(0)
2014	Charlotte Eagles	17	(0)
2015–2016	Colorado Springs Switchbacks	47	(2)
2017	Phoenix Rising FC	7	(1)
- * Club domestic league appearances and goals as of 15:00, 21 October 2017 (UTC)

Jarvis "J. J." Greer Jr. (born February 4, 1991) is an American soccer player who plays as a defender.

== Career ==
=== College and amateur ===
Greer played five years of college soccer at the University of Memphis between 2009 and 2013. While at college, Greer also appeared for USL PDL club's Mississippi Brilla and Portland Timbers U23s.

=== Professional career ===
Greer signed with USL Pro club Charlotte Eagles on March 7, 2014.

Greer signed with USL Pro's Colorado Springs Switchbacks on January 29, 2015.

Greer signed with Phoenix Rising FC on November 15, 2016.
