= Shaquille Jimenez =

Costa Rican footballer (born 1996)

Shaquille Jiménez
Personal information
- Full name: Neeuro Shaquille Jiménez Ortega
- Date of birth: 29 March 1996 (age 30)
- Place of birth: Liberia, Costa Rica
- Height: 1.75 m (5 ft 9 in)
- Position: Right back

Team information
- Current team: Uruguay de Coronado

Youth career
- Deportivo Saprissa

Senior career*
Years	Team	Apps	(Gls)
2014–2018	Deportivo Saprissa	1	(0)
2017	→ Portland Timbers 2 (loan)	12	(0)
2018	Limón	0	(0)
2019	Limón	1	(0)
2020–	Uruguay de Coronado	0	(0)
- * Club domestic league appearances and goals as of 18:59, 4 June 2020 (UTC)

Neeuro Shaquille Jiménez Ortega (born 29 March 1996) is a Costa Rican footballer who currently plays for C.S. Uruguay de Coronado.

== Career ==
Jiménez joined United Soccer League side Portland Timbers 2 on 1 March 2017.

In 2020, Shaquille joined C.S. Uruguay de Coronad.
