= Devante Dubose =

American soccer player

Personal information
- Date of birth: August 5, 1992 (age 34)
- Place of birth: Oakland, California, United States
- Height: 5 ft 10 in (1.78 m)
- Position: Defender

Youth career
- East Bay United/Bay Oaks

College career
Years	Team	Apps	(Gls)
2010–2013	Virginia Tech Hokies	60	(0)

Senior career*
Years	Team	Apps	(Gls)
2013	Midland/Odessa Sockers	8	(0)
2014	San Jose Earthquakes U23	14	(0)
2014–2015	CD Aguiluchos USA		
2015	FC Tucson	11	(1)
2016	Oklahoma City Energy U23	14	(0)
2016	Oklahoma City Energy	1	(0)
2018	Phoenix Rising	15	(1)
2019	Oakland Roots	3	(0)
2020–2021	Richmond Kickers	5	(0)
- * Club domestic league appearances and goals as of November 2, 2021

Devante Dubose (born August 5, 1992) is an American former professional soccer player who last played for the Richmond Kickers in USL League One.

On February 19, 2019, Dubose became the first player ever signed by Oakland Roots SC.

Dubose signed with the Richmond Kickers of USL League One on 6 December 2019.
