= Kody Wakasa =

American soccer player

Personal information
- Full name: Kody M. Wasaka
- Date of birth: May 6, 1994 (age 32)
- Place of birth: Belmont, California, United States
- Height: 1.86 m (6 ft 1 in)
- Position: Defender

Youth career
- De Anza Force

College career
Years	Team	Apps	(Gls)
2012–2016	Cal Poly Mustangs	64	(3)

Senior career*
Years	Team	Apps	(Gls)
2014	Ventura County Fusion	0	(0)
2017–2018	Phoenix Rising	38	(1)
2019–2020	FC Tucson	17	(1)
- * Club domestic league appearances and goals as of October 21, 2019

Kody Wakasa (born May 6, 1994) is an American former soccer player who previously played as a defender for FC Tucson in USL League One.

== Early life ==
Kody M. Wakasa was born in Belmont, California on May 6, 1994. His father, Michael, played soccer in high school and his mother Bonnie, played at UC Davis.

== Career ==
=== College ===
Wakasa played five years of college soccer at California Polytechnic State University between 2012 and 2016. While at Cal Poly, Wakasa scored the game-winning overtime header against UC Santa Barbara in front of a crowd that was the 12th largest attendance in NCAA men's soccer regular-season history. He also was with USL PDL side Ventura County Fusion during his time at Cal Poly, but never appeared for the club.

=== Professional ===
Wakasa signed with United Soccer League club Phoenix Rising on March 24, 2017. After playing two years at Phoenix Rising, he then joined FC Tucson in USL League One in 2019. Wakasa retired on July 2, 2020, in order to attend the Stritch School of Medicine at Loyola University Chicago.
