= Victor Vásquez =

American soccer player

Personal information
- Full name: Victor Vásquez
- Date of birth: 8 July 1993 (age 33)
- Place of birth: Anaheim, California, U.S.
- Height: 1.78 m (5 ft 10 in)
- Position: Defender

Youth career
- Chivas USA

College career
Years	Team	Apps	(Gls)
2012	Humboldt State Lumberjacks	0	(0)
2013–2015	Cal State Northridge Matadors	58	(0)

Senior career*
Years	Team	Apps	(Gls)
2013	North Sound SeaWolves	4	(0)
2016	FC Golden State Force	5	(0)
2017	Phoenix Rising	27	(0)
2018	La Máquina		
2019–	Cal FC		
- * Club domestic league appearances and goals as of October 16, 2018

Victor Vásquez (born July 8, 1993) is an American soccer player who plays as a defender for Cal FC in the United Premier Soccer League.

== Career ==
=== College and amateur ===
Vásquez played three years of college soccer at Cal State Northridge between 2013 and 2015 after transferring from Humboldt State University. In 2016, Vásquez played with USL PDL side FC Golden State Force.

=== Professional ===
Vásquez signed with United Soccer League club Phoenix Rising on December 15, 2016.
