= Doueugui Mala =

Ivorian footballer

Personal information
- Full name: Doueugui Jean-Marie Mala
- Date of birth: December 20, 1993 (age 32)
- Place of birth: Abidjan, Ivory Coast
- Height: 1.83 m (6 ft 0 in)
- Position: Defender

Team information
- Current team: Gagra
- Number: 24

Senior career*
Years	Team	Apps	(Gls)
- Williamsville Athletic Club
2017–2019	Phoenix Rising	41	(0)
2020	Oakland Roots	0	(0)
2021–2023	F.C. Kafr Qasim	79	(3)
2023–2024	Ihud Bnei Shefa-'Amr	33	(1)
2023–	Gagra	3	(0)
- * Club domestic league appearances and goals as of 15 April 2025

Doueugui Jean-Marie Mala (born December 20, 1993) is an Ivorian footballer who plays for Gagra in the Georgian Erovnuli Liga.

== Career ==
Mala, who plays as a defender, signed with United Soccer League side Phoenix Rising FC from Williamsville Athletic Club on 10 August 2017.

In February 2020, Mala joined Oakland Roots SC.
