= 2021 San Antonio FC season =

San Antonio FC
2021 season
- Owner: Spurs Sports & Entertainment
- Head coach: Alen Marcina
- Stadium: Toyota Field
- USLC: Mountain Division: 2nd Overall: 10th
- USLC Playoffs: Conference Finals
- U.S. Open Cup: Cancelled
- Copa Tejas: 4th
- Copa Tejas Shield: Runners-up
- Top goalscorer: League: Nathan (11 goals); All: Nathan (13 goals)
- Highest home attendance: 6,516 vs Austin Bold FC (October 23, 2021)
- Lowest home attendance: 3,735 (Note: Capacity limited due to the COVID-19 pandemic in the United States.) vs Real Monarchs (May 8, 2021)
- Average home league attendance: League: 4,832; Playoffs: 7,485
- Biggest win: 3–0 (May 1 vs. Colorado Springs Switchbacks FC); 3–0 (July 21 vs. New Mexico United); 3–0 (July 31 at Austin Bold FC); 3–0 (October 30 vs. Colorado Springs Switchbacks FC)
- Biggest defeat: 2–0 (June 16 at New Mexico United); 2–0 (August 4 at El Paso Locomotive FC); 4–2 (October 20 at New Mexico United)
Home colors	Away colors	Third colors

The 2021 San Antonio FC season was the club's sixth season of existence. Including the San Antonio Thunder of the original NASL and the former San Antonio Scorpions of the modern NASL, it was the 12th season of professional soccer in San Antonio. The club played in the USL Championship, the second division of the United States soccer league system, and would have participated in the U.S. Open Cup, however the field of teams was reduced due to ongoing COVID-19 pandemic concerns and eventually cancelled.

== Club ==
=== Coaching staff ===
Position	Staff
Head coach	(Canada) Alen Marcina
SAFC Pro Academy Director & Assistant coach	(Wales) Nick Evans
Director of Goalkeeping	(Mexico) Juan Lamadrid
Assistant coach	(Croatia) Dario Pot
Assistant coach	(United States) Oscar Munoz
Assistant coach	(United States) Tim Chestney
Assistant coach	(United States) Jeremiah Narvaez
Assistant coach	(United States) Ryan Roushandel
High Performance Coordinator	(United States) Sean Arters
Athletic trainer	(United States) Jesse Lowrance
Equipment Manager	(United States) Rashad Moore

Source: San Antonio FC

=== Other information ===
Owner	(United States) Spurs Sports & Entertainment
Chairman	(United States) Julianna Hawn Holt
Managing Director	(United States) Tim Holt
Ground (capacity and dimensions)	Toyota Field (8,200 / 110x70 yards)
Training Ground	S.T.A.R. Soccer Complex

Source: San Antonio FC

== Squad information ==
=== First team squad ===
As of September 29, 2021.

Squad No.	Name	Nationality	Position(s)	Date of birth (age)
Goalkeepers
37	Matt Cardone	(United States)	GK	June 18, 1993 (age 33)
99	Carlos Mercado	(United States)	GK	September 27, 1999 (age 26)
Defenders
3	Mitchell Taintor	(United States)	DF	September 11, 1994 (age 32)
13	Mathieu Deplagne	(France)	DF	October 1, 1991 (age 34)
23	Sam Gleadle	(England)	DF	March 20, 1996 (age 30)
24	Kortne Ford	(United States)	DF	January 26, 1996 (age 30)
27	Joaquín Varela	(Argentina)	DF	March 25, 1997 (age 29)
31	Connor Maloney	(United States)	DF	May 18, 1995 (age 31)
33	Jasser Khmiri	(Tunisia)	DF	July 27, 1997 (age 29)
44	Axel Sjöberg	(Sweden)	DF	March 8, 1991 (age 35)
47	Roman Holt	(United States)	DF	March 9, 2005 (age 21)
49	Bradley Dildy	(United States)	DF	May 20, 2004 (age 22)
Midfielders
4	Chris Lema	(United States)	MF	August 5, 1996 (age 30)
6	PC	(Brazil)	MF	March 10, 1994 (age 32)
8	Cameron Lindley	(United States)	MF	July 18, 1997 (age 29)
14	Ollie Wright	(England)	MF	March 1, 1999 (age 27)
17	Jose Gallegos	(United States)	MF	September 22, 2001 (age 24)
19	Shandon Hopeau	(United States)	MF	December 1, 1998 (age 27)
20	Marcus Epps	(United States)	MF	January 16, 1995 (age 31)
25	Mohammed Abu	(Ghana)	MF	November 14, 1991 (age 34)
43	Rocky Perez	(United States)	MF	January 8, 2004 (age 22)
Forwards
7	Nathan Fogaça	(Brazil)	FW	June 9, 1999 (age 27)
9	Santiago Patiño	(Colombia)	FW	March 10, 1997 (age 29)
11	Justin Dhillon	(United States)	FW	June 6, 1995 (age 31)
48	Abraham Lincon	(United States)	FW	April 21, 2004 (age 22)

== Player movement ==
=== In ===
Pos	Player	Previous club	Fee	Date	Source
MF	(England) Ollie Wright	(United States) Corpus Christi FC	Undisclosed	December 15, 2020	
MF	(United States) Cameron Lindley	(United States) Indy Eleven	Undisclosed	December 18, 2020	
MF	(Brazil) PC	(United States) San Antonio FC	Re-signed	December 21, 2020	
GK	(United States) Matt Cardone	(United States) San Antonio FC	Re-signed	December 23, 2020	
FW	(Colombia) Santiago Patiño	(United States) Orlando City SC	Undisclosed	January 6, 2021	
DF	(United States) Connor Maloney	(United States) San Antonio FC	Re-signed	January 7, 2021	
MF	(United States) Ethan Bryant	(United States) San Antonio FC	Re-signed	January 12, 2021	
MF	(United States) Chris Lema	(United States) New York Red Bulls	Undisclosed	January 14, 2021	
FW	(United States) Justin Dhillon	(United States) Seattle Sounders FC	Undisclosed	January 15, 2021	
MF	(Argentina) Emil Cuello	(United States) LA Galaxy	Undisclosed	January 20, 2021	
DF	(Sweden) Axel Sjöberg	(United States) D.C. United	Undisclosed	January 21, 2021	
MF	(United States) Marcus Epps	(United States) Portland Timbers 2	Undisclosed	January 22, 2021	
DF	(England) Sam Gleadle	(United States) Minnesota United FC	Undisclosed	April 6, 2021	
DF	(France) Mathieu Deplagne	(United States) FC Cincinnati	Undisclosed	April 8, 2021	
FW	(United States) Abraham Lincon	(United States) SAFC Pro Academy	Undisclosed	April 22, 2021	
FW	(United States) Fabrizio Bernal	(United States) SAFC Pro Academy	Undisclosed	April 22, 2021	
MF	(United States) Rocky Perez	(United States) SAFC Pro Academy	Undisclosed	April 22, 2021	
DF	(United States) Roman Holt	(United States) SAFC Pro Academy	Undisclosed	April 22, 2021	
DF	(United States) Bradley Dildy	(United States) SAFC Pro Academy	Undisclosed	July 16, 2021	
MF	(Ghana) Mohammed Abu	(United States) D.C. United	Undisclosed	July 19, 2021	

=== Out ===
Pos	Player	Transferred To	Fee	Date	Source
FW	(Argentina) Luis Solignac	(Chile) San Luis de Quillota	Undisclosed	October 26, 2020	
DF	(United States) Blake Smith	Retired	Undisclosed	November 6, 2020	
DF	(United States) Mitchell Taintor	(United States) Sacramento Republic FC	Undisclosed	December 3, 2020	
DF	(Ghana) Ebenezer Ackon	(United States) San Diego Loyal SC	Undisclosed	December 15, 2020	
MF	(Argentina) Cristian Parano	(Portugal) F.C. Paços de Ferreira	Undisclosed	January 5, 2021	
FW	(United States) Fabrizio Bernal	(United States) Xavier University	Undisclosed	August 12, 2021	

=== Loan in ===
Pos	Player	Loaned From	Start	End	Source
DF	(Tunisia) Jasser Khmiri	(Canada) Vancouver Whitecaps FC	March 26, 2021	End of season	
FW	(Brazil) Nathan Fogaça	(Brazil) Coritiba Foot Ball Club	April 1, 2021	End of season	
MF	(United States) Shandon Hopeau	(United States) Seattle Sounders FC	April 15, 2021	End of season	
DF	(Argentina) Joaquín Varela	(Argentina) San Martín de Tucumán	May 12, 2021	End of season	
FW	(Canada) Jordan Perruzza	(Canada) Toronto FC	May 20, 2021	July 16, 2021	
DF	(United States) Kortne Ford	(United States) Colorado Rapids	August 19, 2021	End of season	
DF	(United States) Mitchell Taintor	(United States) Sacramento Republic FC	August 25, 2021	End of season	
GK	(United States) Jordan Farr	(United States) Indy Eleven	November 4, 2021	End of season	

=== Loan out ===
Pos	Player	Loaned To	Start	End	Source
MF	(United States) Ethan Bryant	(United States) Richmond Kickers	August 12, 2021	End of season	
MF	(Argentina) Emil Cuello	(United States) Sacramento Republic FC	August 25, 2021	End of season	
DF	(Isle of Man) Liam Doyle	(United States) Indy Eleven	September 13, 2021	End of season	
MF	(United States) Leo Torres	(United States) Real Monarchs	September 29, 2021	End of season	

== Pre-season ==
The pre-season match vs North Texas SC was announced on March 3, 2021, by NTSC. The remaining schedule was released by SAFC on March 19, 2021.

March 20, 2021	San Antonio FC	3–1	North Texas SC	San Antonio, Texas
3:00 PM CDT	Epps (1st period); Wright (2nd period); Torres (3rd period)	Report	(3rd period)	Stadium: Toyota Field; Attendance: Closed-Door
Note: Played in three 30-minute periods.

March 27, 2021 La Copita	San Antonio FC	0–0 (4–5 p)	FC Dallas	San Antonio, Texas
1:00 PM CDT	PC (yellow card) 14'; Dhillon (yellow card) 40'; Lindley (yellow card) 53'	Report	Obrian (yellow card) 36'	Stadium: Toyota Field; Attendance: Closed-Door
	Penalties
	Doyle (penalty scored); Bernal (penalty scored); Tyrpak (penalty scored); Lincon (penalty missed); Academy Player (penalty scored); Academy Player (penalty missed)		Pepi (penalty missed); Nelson (penalty scored); ElMedkhar (penalty scored); Hernandez (penalty scored); Sealy (penalty scored); Megiolaro (penalty scored)

April 2, 2021 La Copita	FC Dallas	5–0	San Antonio FC	Frisco, Texas
11:00 AM CDT	Jara 7' (Obrian); 19' (o.g.); Hollingshead 49' (Vargas); Obrian 52', 68' (Ricuarte)	Report		Stadium: Toyota Stadium; Attendance: Closed-Door

April 10, 2021 La Copita	Austin FC	5–1	San Antonio FC	Austin, Texas
4:00 PM CDT	Domínguez; Hoesen 14' (Sweat); Pochettino 35'; Ring 54' (pen.)	ATX Report	Patiño 39'	Stadium: St. David's Performance Center; Attendance: Closed-Door

April 24, 2021	San Antonio FC	2–2	Rio Grande Valley FC Toros	San Antonio, Texas
1:00 PM CDT	Patiño 17'; Lindley	Report	90+3'	Stadium: Toyota Field; Attendance: Closed-Door

== Competitions ==
=== Overall ===
Position in the Mountain Division

Competition	Started round	Final position / round	First match	Last match
USL Championship	—	2nd	May 1, 2021	October 30, 2021
USL Championship Playoffs	Conference Quarterfinals	Conference Final	November 5, 2021	November 20, 2021

Updated to match played November 22, 2021
Source: Competitions

=== Overview ===
Competition	Record							
Competition	G	W	D	L	GF	GA	GD	Win %
USL Championship	32	14	10	8	50	38	+12	43.75
USL Championship Playoffs	3	2	1	0	6	2	+4	66.67
Total	35	16	11	8	56	40	+16	45.71

Updated to match played November 22, 2021
Source: Competitions

=== USL Championship ===
==== Group table ====
Mountain Division

Pos	Team	Pld	W	L	T	GF	GA	GD	Pts	Qualification
1	El Paso Locomotive FC	32	18	4	10	56	34	+22	64	Advance to USL Championship Playoffs
2	San Antonio FC	32	14	8	10	50	38	+12	52	Advance to USL Championship Playoffs
3	Colorado Springs Switchbacks FC	32	13	8	11	61	48	+13	50	Advance to USL Championship Playoffs
4	Rio Grande Valley FC Toros	32	13	11	8	49	42	+7	47	Advance to USL Championship Playoffs
5	New Mexico United	32	12	10	10	44	40	+4	46	
6	Austin Bold FC	32	10	10	12	32	42	−10	42	
7	Real Monarchs	32	5	20	7	28	56	−28	22	

Source: USL

==== Results summary ====
Overall								Home						Away					
Pld	W	D	L	GF	GA	GD	Pts	W	D	L	GF	GA	GD	W	D	L	GF	GA	GD
32	14	10	8	50	38	+12	52	7	6	3	27	16	+11	7	4	5	23	22	+1

Last updated: October 31, 2021.

==== Results by matchday ====
Position in the Mountain Division

Round	1	2	3	4	5	6	7	8	9	10	11	12	13	14	15	16	17	18	19	20	21	22	23	24	25	26	27	28	29	30	31	32
Stadium	H	H	A	H	H	A	A	A	H	A	H	A	H	H	A	A	A	H	H	H	A	A	A	A	H	A	A	H	H	A	H	H
Result	W	D	L	W	D	D	D	L	D	D	L	W	W	L	W	L	W	W	W	D	L	W	W	W	L	W	D	W	D	L	D	W
Position	1	2	2	2	2	3	4	4	5	6	6	6	5	6	6	5	4	4	3	3	3	3	2	2	3	3	2	2	2	2	2	2

Updated to match(es) played on October 31, 2021. Source:
A = Away; H = Home; W = Win; D = Draw; L = Loss

==== Matches ====
The home opener vs Colorado Springs was announced on March 23, 2021. The remaining schedule was released on March 30, 2021. Home team is listed first, left to right.

Win Draw Loss Postponed

Kickoff times are in CDT (UTC-05) unless shown otherwise

May 1, 2021 1	San Antonio FC	3–0	Colorado Springs Switchbacks FC	San Antonio, Texas
7:30 p.m. CST	Patiño 16', (yellow card) 24', (goal) 27', 87'	Report	Ockford (yellow card) 38'; Torres (yellow card) 70'	Stadium: Toyota Field; Attendance: 3,768; Referee: Matthew Thompson

May 8, 2021 2	San Antonio FC	2–2	Real Monarchs	San Antonio, Texas
7:30 p.m. CST	Epps 19'; Nathan (red card) 31'; Patiño (yellow card) 38'; Cuello 44'; Lindley (yellow card) 45'; PC (yellow card) 68'	Report	Garcia (yellow card) 26' (yellow-red card) 75'; Bancé 47'; Davis 55'; Moberg (yellow card) 83'; Brown (yellow card) 88'	Stadium: Toyota Field; Attendance: 3,735; Referee: Michael Radchuk

May 16, 2021 3	Rio Grande Valley FC Toros	2–1	San Antonio FC	Edinburg, Texas
7:30 p.m. CST	Kuzain 42'; Sorto 57'; Robinson (yellow card) 75'; López (yellow card) 90+6'	Report	Patiño (yellow card) 31', (goal) 68'; Lema (yellow card) 45'; Cuello (yellow card) 45+3'; Khmiri (yellow card) 78'	Stadium: H-E-B Park; Attendance: 2,610; Referee: Melvin Rivas

May 22, 2021 4	San Antonio FC	2–1	Birmingham Legion FC	San Antonio, Texas
7:30 p.m. CST	Patiño 1', (yellow card) 18'; Varela (yellow card) 25'; Cuello (yellow card) 60'; Nathan (yellow card) 74'; Lindley (yellow card) 81'; Perruzza 81'	Report	Kavita (yellow card) 18'; Brett 90+4'	Stadium: Toyota Field; Attendance: 3,845; Referee: Sergii Demianchuk
Note: 150th USL league match

May 29, 2021 5	San Antonio FC	1–1	Rio Grande Valley FC Toros	San Antonio, Texas
7:30 p.m. CST	Lema (yellow card) 34'; Epps 40'; Cuello (red card) 80'	Report	Pimentel (yellow card) 42'; J. Sánchez (yellow card) 55'; Azócar 89'; V. Sánchez (yellow card) 90'	Stadium: Toyota Field; Attendance: 3,852; Referee: Jon Freemon

June 5, 2021 6	Colorado Springs Switchbacks FC	1–1	San Antonio FC	Colorado Springs, Colorado
7:00 p.m. CDT	Barry 6'; Mahoney (yellow card) 15'; Beckford (yellow card) 17'; Edwards (red card) 45+1'; Makangila (yellow card) 49'	Report	Patiño (yellow card) 34', (red card) 45+1'; Dhillon 88'	Stadium: Weidner Field; Attendance: 5,531; Referee: Brandon Stevis

June 11, 2021 7	Las Vegas Lights FC	1–1	San Antonio FC	Las Vegas, Nevada
9:30 p.m. CDT	Crisostomo (yellow card) 72'; Jennings 82' (pen.); Vázquez (yellow card) 88'	Report	Varela 9', (yellow card) 84'; Lindley (yellow card) 72'; Lema (yellow card) 90+3'	Stadium: Cashman Field; Referee: Lukasz Szpala

June 16, 2021 8	New Mexico United	2–0	San Antonio FC	Albuquerque, New Mexico
8:30 p.m. CDT	Suggs 33'; Yearwood 52'	Report	Doyle (yellow card) 68'; Nathan (yellow card) 77'; Gleadle (yellow card) 82'; Varela (yellow card) 90'	Stadium: Isotopes Park; Attendance: 6,260; Referee: Elton García

June 19, 2021 9	San Antonio FC	1–1	Rio Grande Valley FC Toros	San Antonio, Texas
7:30 p.m. CST	Dhillon 13', (yellow card) 17'; Lindley (yellow card) 15'; Valera (yellow card) 66'; Lema (yellow card) 90'; Doyle (yellow card) 90+5'	Report	Sorto 23'; Sánchez (yellow card) 59'; Albuquerque (yellow card) 64'; Sánchez (yellow card) 90+1'; Ramsay (yellow card) 90+5'	Stadium: Toyota Field; Attendance: 3,920; Referee: Elijio Arreguin

June 26, 2021 10	Real Monarchs	1–1	San Antonio FC	Herriman, Utah
9:00 p.m. CST	Martínez 39'; Nydegger (yellow card) 85'	Report	Deplagne (yellow card) 61'; Dhillon 77'	Stadium: Zions Bank Stadium; Attendance: 1,158; Referee: Ekaterina Koroleva

July 3, 2021 11	San Antonio FC	0–1	Austin Bold FC	San Antonio, Texas
7:30 p.m. CDT	Doyle (yellow card) 15'; Lindley (yellow card) 41'; Patiño (yellow card) 71'; Deplagne (yellow card) 79'	Report	Diouf 2', (yellow card) 33'; Gordon (yellow card) 45'; Báez (yellow card) 52'; Okoli (red card) 60'; Panicco (yellow card) 77'; Soto (yellow card) 83'	Stadium: Toyota Field; Attendance: 6,243; Referee: Matthew Franz

July 17, 2021 12	Colorado Springs Switchbacks FC	2–3	San Antonio FC	Colorado Springs, Colorado
1:00 p.m. CDT	Barry 14'; Edwards (yellow card) 23'; Mayaka (yellow card) 41'; Ockford (yellow card) 57'; Zandi 73'	Report	Nathan 7', 43' (pen.); PC 24' (pen.), (yellow card) 36'; Cardone (yellow card) 90+1'; Gleadle (yellow card) 90+4'; Cuello (yellow card) 90+7'	Stadium: Weidner Field; Attendance: 4,875; Referee: Mark Allatin

July 21, 2021 13	San Antonio FC	3–0	New Mexico United	San Antonio, Texas
8:30 p.m. CDT	Nathan 35', 63'; Cuello (yellow card) 68'; Doyle (yellow card) 73'; Gallegos 90+3'	Report		Stadium: Toyota Field; Attendance: 5,601; Referee: Natalie Simon

July 28, 2021 14	San Antonio FC	1–2	El Paso Locomotive FC	San Antonio, Texas
7:30 p.m. CDT	Lindley (yellow card) 23'; Sjöberg (yellow card) 27', (goal) 74'; Abu (yellow card) 42'	Report	Solignac 18' (pen.); Bahner (yellow card) 30'; Luna (yellow card) 37', (goal) 71'; Ryan (yellow card) 59'	Stadium: Toyota Field; Attendance: 5,273; Referee: Malik Badawi

July 31, 2021 15	Austin Bold FC	0–3	San Antonio FC	Del Valle, Texas
8:00 p.m. CDT	Gordon (yellow card) 12'; Ycaza (yellow card) 20'; Okoli (yellow card) 23'; Garcia (yellow card) 29'; Taylor (yellow card) 37'; Hinds (yellow card) 40'; Panicco (yellow card) 67'	Report	Cuello 30' (pen.); Gallegos (yellow card) 34', (goal) 74'; Abu (yellow card) 45+4'; Deplagne (yellow card) 59'; Nathan 69' (pen.); Maloney (yellow card) 90+5'	Stadium: Bold Stadium; Attendance: 1,577; Referee: Jervis Atagana

August 4, 2021 16	El Paso Locomotive FC	2–0	San Antonio FC	El Paso, Texas
8:00 p.m. CDT	Luna 29'; King (yellow card) 37'; Aguinaga (yellow card) 44', (goal) 45+2'; Jérôme (yellow card) 68'; Rebellón (yellow card) 70' (yellow-red card) 77'	Report	Deplagne (yellow card) 12'; Maloney (yellow card) 56'	Stadium: Southwest University Park; Attendance: 4,688; Referee: Brad Jensen

August 8, 2021 17	Rio Grande Valley FC Toros	1–2	San Antonio FC	Edinburg, Texas
7:30 p.m. CDT	Azócar 35'; Robinson (yellow card) 38'; Njie (yellow card) 77'; Pimentel (yellow card) 79'	Report	Nathan 18' (pen.), 58'; Khmiri (yellow card) 50'; Abu (yellow card) 50'; Cardone (yellow card) 78'	Stadium: H-E-B Park; Attendance: 3,495; Referee: Elvis Osmanovic

August 14, 2021	New York Red Bulls II	PP	San Antonio FC	Montclair, New Jersey
6:00 p.m. CDT		Report		Stadium: MSU Soccer Park
Note: Postponed after multiple covered individuals from San Antonio tested positive for COVID-19.

August 21, 2021	San Antonio FC	PP	Real Monarchs	San Antonio, Texas
7:30 p.m. CST				Stadium: Toyota Field
Note: Postponed after multiple covered individuals from San Antonio tested positive for COVID-19.

August 28, 2021 18	San Antonio FC	2–1	El Paso Locomotive FC	San Antonio, Texas
7:30 p.m. CDT	Epps 32'; PC (yellow card) 41'; Dhillon 90+3', (yellow card) 90+3'	Report	Fox (yellow card) 24'; Velásquez 54'	Stadium: Toyota Field; Attendance: 4,883; Referee: Ricardo Fierro

September 1, 2021 19	San Antonio FC	3–2	Real Monarchs	San Antonio, Texas
7:30 p.m. CST	Nathan (yellow card) 9'; Gallegos 27'; Ford 75'; Epps 79'	Report	Benitez (yellow card) 1'; Bancé 57', (yellow card) 71'; Flores (yellow card) 59'; Taintor 90+4' (o.g.)	Stadium: Toyota Field; Attendance: 3,836; Referee: Joshua Encarnación
Note: Rescheduled from August 21 after multiple covered individuals from San Antonio tested positive for COVID-19 prior to the club’s postponed match against New York Red Bulls II on August 14

September 4, 2021 20	San Antonio FC	1–1	Pittsburgh Riverhounds SC	San Antonio, Texas
7:30 p.m. CST	Ford (yellow card) 31'; PC (yellow card) 38'; Nathan (penalty missed) 49', 64'	Report	Wharton (yellow card) 69'; Forbes (yellow card) 87'; Dixon 90'	Stadium: Toyota Field; Attendance: 5,009; Referee: Elijio Arreguin

September 7, 2021 21	Austin Bold FC	2–1	San Antonio FC	Del Valle, Texas
8:00 p.m. CDT	Garcia (yellow card) 36', (goal) 45'; Fernandez 40'; Báez (yellow card) 72'; Avila (yellow card) 83'; Soto (yellow card) 88'	Report	Sjöberg (yellow card) 32'; Dhillon 42'; PC (yellow card) 56'	Stadium: Bold Stadium; Attendance: 650; Referee: Matthew Corrigan

September 11, 2021 22	Real Monarchs	0–1	San Antonio FC	Herriman, Utah
8:00 p.m. CST	Saucedo (yellow card) 9'; Bancé (yellow card) 35'; Benitez (yellow card) 54'; Moberg (yellow card) 64'	Report	Lindley (yellow card) 31'; Epps 80'	Stadium: Zions Bank Stadium; Attendance: 1,649; Referee: Gerald Flores

September 15, 2021 23	New York Red Bulls II	1–2	San Antonio FC	Montclair, New Jersey
6:00 p.m. CDT	Ngoma (yellow card) 25'; Egbo (yellow card) 28'; Edelman (yellow card) 40'; Zajec 55'; Castillo (yellow card) 64'	Report	Dhillon (yellow card) 18'; Gallegos 33'; Abu (yellow card) 37' (yellow-red card) 53'; Joseph 48' (o.g.); Varela (yellow card) 65'; Cardone (yellow card) 90'	Stadium: MSU Soccer Park; Attendance: 468; Referee: Jonathan Bilinski
Note: Rescheduled from August 14 after multiple covered individuals from San Antonio tested positive for COVID-19

September 18, 2021 24	Sacramento Republic FC	0–1	San Antonio FC	Sacramento, California
9:30 p.m. CDT	Villarrealq (yellow card) 10'; McCrary (yellow card) 57'; Wheeler-Omiunu (yellow card) 90+1'; Foster (red card) 90+8'; Belmar (red card) 90+8'	Report	Ford 74', (red card) 90+8'; Cardone (yellow card) 82'; Epps (yellow card) 83'; Gallegos (yellow card) 86'; Dhillon (yellow card) 90'	Stadium: Heart Health Park; Attendance: 9,483; Referee: Ismir Pekmic

September 25, 2021 25	San Antonio FC	0–1	New Mexico United	San Antonio, Texas
7:30 p.m. CDT	Sjöberg (yellow card) 38'	Report	Tetteh (yellow card) 29'; Tinari (yellow card) 72'; Ryden (yellow card) 74'; Wehan 84'; Martinez (yellow card) 85'	Stadium: Toyota Field; Attendance: 5,503; Referee: Elton García

October 3, 2021 26	OKC Energy FC	0–1	San Antonio FC	Oklahoma City, Oklahoma
5:00 p.m. CST	Kurimoto (yellow card) 31'; Batista (yellow card) 54'; Bijev (yellow card) 86'	Report	Taintor (yellow card) 34'; Epps 66'; Gallegos (yellow card) 80'; Hopeau (yellow card) 90+4'	Stadium: Taft Stadium; Attendance: 1,828; Referee: Lukasz Szpala

October 6, 2021 27	El Paso Locomotive FC	3–3	San Antonio FC	El Paso, Texas
8:00 p.m. CDT	Yuma (yellow card) 42'; King 57'; Ross 73'; Luna 85'	Report	Dhillon 10'; Deplagne 27', (yellow card) 62'; Ford (yellow card) 45+1', (goal) 90+4'; Fogaça (yellow card) 82'	Stadium: Southwest University Park; Attendance: 5,250; Referee: Sergii Demianchuk

October 10, 2021 28	San Antonio FC	4–2	Memphis 901 FC	San Antonio, Texas
7:30 p.m. CDT	Deplagne (yellow card) 11'; Gallegos 30'; Nathan (yellow card) 44', (goal) 66', 86'; Khmiri (yellow card) 45+1' (yellow-red card) 90+3'; Taintor (yellow card) 51'; Cardone (yellow card) 82'	Report	Salazar (yellow card) 13', (goal) 22'; Thomas (yellow card) 73'; Dacres 90+5' (pen.)	Stadium: Toyota Field; Attendance: 5,005; Referee: Kevin Broadley

October 16, 2021 29	San Antonio FC	1–1	FC Tulsa	San Antonio, Texas
7:30 p.m. CDT	Maloney (yellow card) 25'; Gallegos 56'	Report	Da Costa 27'; Kibato (yellow card) 45+1'; Marlon (yellow card) 59'; Ayagwa (yellow card) 87'; Milke (yellow card) 87'	Stadium: Toyota Field; Attendance: 5,090; Referee: Elvis Osmanovic
Note: 175th USL league match

October 20, 2021 30	New Mexico United	4–2	San Antonio FC	Albuquerque, New Mexico
8:00 p.m. CDT	Ilić 12'; Tetteh (yellow card) 21'; Suggs (yellow card) 31'; Yearwood (yellow card) 33'; Ryden (yellow card) 38'; Wehan 66', 88'; Guzmán (yellow card) 72'; Tinari 78'; Tambakis (yellow card) 82'	Report	PC (yellow card) 9'; Fogaça (yellow card) 26', (goal) 32' (pen.); Gallegos (yellow card) 28'; Varela 35', (yellow card) 41'; Wright (yellow card) 47' (yellow-red card) 58'; Ford (yellow card) 86'; Deplagne (yellow card) 90+3'; Epps (yellow card) 90+6'	Stadium: Isotopes Park; Attendance: 5,593; Referee: Michael Radchuk

October 23, 2021 31	San Antonio FC	0–0	Austin Bold FC	San Antonio, Texas
7:30 p.m. CDT	Ford (yellow card) 30'; Maloney (yellow card) 65'; Khmiri (yellow card) 86'	Report	Guadarrama (yellow card) 30'; Panicco (yellow card) 89'	Stadium: Toyota Field; Attendance: 6,516; Referee: Ismir Pekmic

October 30, 2021 32	San Antonio FC	3–0	Colorado Springs Switchbacks FC	San Antonio, Texas
7:30 p.m. CST	Edwards 5' (o.g.); Patiño (yellow card) 24'; Khmiri (yellow card) 45+1'; Gallegos 46'; Ford (yellow card) 63', (goal) 68'; Gleadle (yellow card) 81'; Abu (yellow card) 86'	Report	Barry (yellow card) 81'	Stadium: Toyota Field; Attendance: 5,232; Referee: Matthew Corrigan

=== USL Championship Playoffs ===
On October 20, 2021, San Antonio clinched a spot in the 2021 USL Championship Playoffs.

November 5, 2021 Conference Quarterfinals	San Antonio FC	2–0	San Diego Loyal SC	San Antonio, Texas
8:00 p.m. CDT	PC (yellow card) 6'; Nathan 14'; Patiño 25'; Epps (yellow card) 46'; Maloney (yellow card) 60'	Report	Stoneman (yellow card) 16'; C. Martin (yellow card) 81'; E. Martin (yellow card) 86'	Stadium: Toyota Field; Attendance: 7,003; Referee: Matt Thompson

November 13, 2021 Conference Semifinals	San Antonio FC	3–1	Rio Grande Valley FC Toros	San Antonio, Texas
8:00 p.m. CST	Patiño 24', 55'; Nathan 61'; PC (yellow card) 73'; Farr (yellow card) 84'	Report	Cabezas (yellow card) 43'; Edwards (yellow card) 45+1'; Azócar (yellow card) 64'; Amoh 69' (pen.)	Stadium: Toyota Field; Attendance: 7,966; Referee: Mark Allatin

November 20, 2021 Conference Final	Orange County SC	1–1 (a.e.t.)	San Antonio FC	Irvine, California
9:00 p.m. CST	Damus (yellow card) 6', (goal) 39'; Alston (yellow card) 60'	Report	Nathan (yellow card) 64'; Epps 67'; PC (yellow card) 88'; Taintor (yellow card) 105+3'	Stadium: Championship Soccer Stadium; Attendance: 5,386; Referee: Elton García
	Penalties
	Casiple (penalty scored); Powers (penalty scored); Mines (penalty scored); Enevoldsen (penalty scored); Okoli (penalty scored)		(penalty scored) Maloney; (penalty scored) Patiño; (penalty scored) Khmiri; (penalty missed) Dhillon

=== Exhibition ===
On June 21, 2021, it was announced that San Antonio would host the ‘SAFC International Showcase’ featuring Mexican sides Querétaro F.C. and Pumas UNAM.

July 6, 2021 Friendly	San Antonio FC (United States)	2–4	(Mexico) Querétaro F.C.	San Antonio, Texas
7:30 p.m. CDT	Wright 25'; Nathan 30'; Cuello (yellow card) 69'	Report	Gallardo 27'; Cabrera (yellow card) 32'; Holt 69' (o.g.); Sosa (yellow card) 75'; Ramirez 83', 90'; Torres (yellow card) 86'	Stadium: Toyota Field
Note: SAFC International Showcase

July 9, 2021 Friendly	San Antonio FC (United States)	2–4	(Mexico) Pumas UNAM	San Antonio, Texas
7:30 p.m. CDT	Nathan 10', (yellow card) 27'; Khmiri 23'; Doyle (yellow card) 43'; Mercado (yellow card) 74'	Report	García 19'; Dinenno (yellow card) 45', (goal) 76', 80'; Galindo (yellow card) 59'; Corozo 90'	Stadium: Toyota Field; Attendance: 5,373
Note: SAFC International Showcase

== Statistics ==
=== Appearances ===
Discipline includes league and playoffs play.

No.	Pos.	Name	League		Playoffs		Total		Discipline	
No.	Pos.	Name	Apps	Goals	Apps	Goals	Apps	Goals	Yellow card	Red card
1	GK	(United States) Jordan Farr	0	0	3	0	3	0	1	0
3	DF	(United States) Mitchell Taintor	13	0	3	0	16	0	3	0
4	MF	(United States) Chris Lema	14 (12)	0	0	0	14 (12)	0	4	0
6	MF	(Brazil) PC	18	1	3	0	21	1	9	0
7	FW	(Brazil) Nathan Fogaça	27 (4)	11	3	2	30 (4)	13	7	1
8	MF	(United States) Cameron Lindley	24 (6)	0	0 (1)	0	24 (7)	0	7	0
9	FW	(Colombia) Santiago Patiño	9 (2)	5	3	3	12 (2)	8	7	1
11	MF	(United States) Justin Dhillon	12 (14)	7	0 (3)	0	12 (17)	7	4	0
13	DF	(France) Mathieu Deplagne	18	1	0	0	18	1	7	0
14	MF	(England) Ollie Wright	2 (12)	0	0	0	2 (12)	0	0	1
17	MF	(United States) Jose Gallegos	27 (2)	7	3	0	30 (2)	7	4	0
19	MF	(United States) Shandon Hopeau	1 (10)	0	0	0	1 (10)	0	2	0
20	MF	(United States) Marcus Epps	30 (2)	6	3	1	33 (2)	7	2	0
23	DF	(England) Sam Gleadle	19 (3)	0	0 (3)	0	19 (6)	0	3	0
24	DF	(United States) Kortne Ford	13	4	3	0	16	4	5	1
25	MF	(Ghana) Mohammed Abu	15 (3)	0	3	0	18 (3)	0	4	1
27	DF	(Argentina) Joaquín Varela	9 (7)	2	0	0	9 (7)	2	6	0
31	DF	(United States) Connor Maloney	19 (1)	0	3	0	22 (1)	0	5	0
33	DF	(Tunisia) Jasser Khmiri	15	0	3	0	18	0	4	0
37	GK	(United States) Matt Cardone	32	0	0	0	32	0	5	0
43	MF	(United States) Rocky Perez	0	0	0	0	0	0	0	0
44	DF	(Sweden) Axel Sjöberg	14 (2)	1	0	0	14 (2)	1	3	0
47	DF	(United States) Roman Holt	0	0	0	0	0	0	0	0
48	FW	(United States) Abraham Lincon	0	0	0	0	0	0	0	0
49	DF	(United States) Bradley Dildy	0	0	0	0	0	0	0	0
99	GK	(United States) Carlos Mercado	0 (1)	0	0	0	0 (1)	0	0	0
Players who left the club
	FW	(United States) Fabrizio Bernal	0 (1)	0	0	0	0 (1)	0	0	0
	MF	(United States) Ethan Bryant	0	0	0	0	0	0	0	0
	MF	(Argentina) Emil Cuello	10 (6)	3	0	0	10 (6)	3	5	1
	DF	(Isle of Man) Liam Doyle	10 (3)	0	0	0	10 (3)	0	5	0
	FW	(Canada) Jordan Perruzza	1 (5)	1	0	0	1 (5)	1	0	0
	MF	(United States) Leo Torres	0 (6)	0	0	0	0 (6)	0	0	0

Last updated: November 22, 2021.
Source: San Antonio FC

=== Top scorers ===
The list is sorted by shirt number when total goals are equal.

Rnk	Pos	No.	Player	League	Playoffs	Total
1	FW	7	(Brazil) Nathan Fogaça	11	2	13
2	FW	9	(Colombia) Santiago Patiño	5	3	8
3	FW	11	(United States) Justin Dhillon	7	0	7
3	MF	17	(United States) Jose Gallegos	7	0	7
3	MF	20	(United States) Marcus Epps	6	1	7
6	DF	24	(United States) Kortne Ford	4	0	4
7	MF	10	(Argentina) Emil Cuello	3	0	3
8	DF	27	(Argentina) Joaquín Varela	2	0	2
9	MF	9	(Brazil) PC	1	0	1
9	DF	13	(France) Mathieu Deplagne	1	0	1
9	DF	44	(Sweden) Axel Sjöberg	1	0	1
9	FW	77	(Canada) Jordan Perruzza	1	0	1
#	Own goals			1	0	1
TOTALS				50	6	56

Last updated: November 22, 2021.
Source: San Antonio FC

=== Clean sheets ===
The list is sorted by shirt number when total clean sheets are equal.

Rnk	No.	Player	League	Playoffs	Total
1	0	(United States) Matt Cardone	7	0	7
2	1	(United States) Jordan Farr	0	1	1
TOTALS			7	1	8

Last updated: November 22, 2021.
Source: San Antonio FC

=== Summary ===
Games played	35 (32 USL Championship) (3 USL Championship Playoffs)
Games won	16 (14 USL Championship) (2 USL Championship Playoffs)
Games drawn	11 (10 USL Championship) (1 USL Championship Playoffs)
Games lost	8 (8 USL Championship) (0 USL Championship Playoffs)
Goals scored	56 (50 USL Championship) (6 USL Championship Playoffs)
Goals conceded	40 (38 USL Championship) (2 USL Championship Playoffs)
Goal difference	16 (+12 USL Championship) (+4 USL Championship Playoffs)
Clean sheets	9 (8 USL Championship) (1 USL Championship Playoffs)
Yellow cards	102 (94 USL Championship) (8 USL Championship Playoffs)
Red cards	7 (7 USL Championship) (0 USL Championship Playoffs)
Most appearances	(United States) Marcus Epps (35 appearances)
Top scorer	(Brazil) Nathan (13 goals)
Winning Percentage	Overall: 16/35 (45.71%)

Last updated: November 22, 2021.
Source: San Antonio FC

== Awards ==
=== Player ===
No.	Player	Award	Week/Month	Source
9	(Colombia) Santiago Patiño	Championship Player of the Week	Week 2	
6	(Brazil) PC	Championship Team of the Week	Week 2	
20	(United States) Marcus Epps	Championship Team of the Week	Week 3	
13	(France) Mathieu Deplagne	Championship Team of the Week	Week 5	
37	(United States) Matt Cardone	Championship Save of the Week	Week 6	
37	(United States) Matt Cardone	Championship Save of the Month	April/May	
37	(United States) Matt Cardone	Championship Team of the Week	Week 13	
7	(Brazil) Nathan Fogaça	Championship Team of the Week	Week 13	
7	(Brazil) Nathan Fogaça	Championship Team of the Week	Week 14	
17	(United States) Jose Gallegos	Championship Team of the Week	Week 14	
7	(Brazil) Nathan Fogaça	Championship Team of the Week	Week 16	
20	(United States) Marcus Epps	Championship Team of the Week	Week 20	
7	(Brazil) Nathan Fogaça	Championship Team of the Week	Week 25	
24	(United States) Kortne Ford	Championship Team of the Week	Week 28	
End of Season Awards
17	(United States) Jose Gallegos	2021 USL Championship All-League Second Team	November	
1	(United States) Jordan Farr	2021 USL Championship Save of the Playoffs	December	
