= Copa Tejas =

Soccer competition in Texas, U.S.

- Founded: 2019; 7 years ago
- Region: Texas
- Teams: 7 (Shield); 3 (Division 1 – male); 2 (Division 2 – male)
- Current champion(s): Shield: Dallas Trinity FC (2025); Division 1: FC Dallas (2026); Division 2: El Paso Locomotive FC (2026)
- Most championships: Shield: San Antonio FC (2 titles); Division 1: FC Dallas (3 titles); Division 2: San Antonio FC; El Paso Locomotive FC (3 titles each)
- Website: copatejas.com

Copa Tejas is the two cup competitions and one shield between the Major League Soccer, USL Championship, NWSL, and USL Super League teams of the state of Texas, awarded by independent supporters groups of the state's teams. It was initially founded in 2019 by supporters of San Antonio FC. It awards a Division 1 trophy for the top Major League Soccer team, a Division 2 trophy for the top USL Championship team, and the Copa Tejas Shield for the best team across all participants. The current Major League Soccer clubs are Austin FC, FC Dallas, and Houston Dynamo FC. The USL Championship clubs are El Paso Locomotive FC and San Antonio FC. NWSL side Houston Dash and USL Super League side Dallas Trinity FC participates only in the Copa Tejas Shield as the lone Texas teams in their respective league.

It was first contested in 2019 and was won by Austin Bold FC.

== History ==
San Antonio FC and Rio Grande Valley FC both competed in the USL from 2016 through 2023, contesting their own rivalry: the South Texas Derby. With the addition of Austin and El Paso in the 2019 season, the Copa Tejas was created by supporters of San Antonio FC to determine the best team in Texas.

Austin Bold FC claimed the inaugural Copa Tejas with a 3–0 win over Rio Grande Valley FC on September 1, 2019. They finished top of the table with a 3–2–1 (W–T–L) record and 11 points.

Due to the coronavirus pandemic and the rescheduling of the 2020 USL Championship season into group play, El Paso was not included in the group with the other Texas teams. This resulted in the lack of a "fair round-robin format", and so the Copa Tejas was not awarded in 2020.

In 2021, with Austin FC joining Major League Soccer, an MLS division of the competition, called Division 1, was created. This was to supplement the existing Texas Derby which is contested between FC Dallas and Houston Dynamo FC. The USL Championship division would now be known as Division 2.

The Copa Tejas Shield was announced in 2021 as a cross-league award, featuring the teams from both the Division 1 and Division 2 competition and NWSL side Houston Dash.

Austin Bold FC announced it would not participate in the 2022 USL Championship season as it actively sought relocation to another city in Texas. Rio Grande Valley FC ceased operations after the 2023 USL Championship season, leaving only two teams at the Division II level.

Dallas Trinity FC was included in the overall ranking from the 2025 Copa Tejas Shield. Since USL Super League runs a fall to spring calendar, the Trinity's 2024–25 season standings was used.

== Division 1 ==
Copa Tejas Division 1

Club	Titles	Years
FC Dallas	3	2021, 2024, 2026
Austin FC	2	2022, 2023
Houston Dynamo FC	1	2025

Year	Champions	Second	Third
2021	FC Dallas	Houston Dynamo FC	Austin FC
2022	Austin FC	FC Dallas	Houston Dynamo FC
2023	Austin FC	Houston Dynamo FC	FC Dallas
2024	FC Dallas	Austin FC	Houston Dynamo FC
2025	Houston Dynamo FC	FC Dallas	Austin FC
2026	FC Dallas	Houston Dynamo FC	Austin FC

=== 2021 ===
2021 results summary
Pos	Team	Pld	W	D	L	GF	GA	GD	Pts
1	FC Dallas (C)	6	3	2	1	14	10	+4	11
2	Houston Dynamo FC	6	2	2	2	12	10	+2	8
3	Austin FC	6	2	0	4	9	15	−6	6

Source: https://copatejas.com/
(C) Champions

Austin FC win FC Dallas win Houston Dynamo FC win Draw

May 8, 2021 1	FC Dallas	1–1	Houston Dynamo FC	Frisco, TX
2:30 p.m. CDT	Obrian 42'	Report	Picault 34' (pen.)	Stadium: Toyota Stadium; Attendance: 8,749; Referee: Alex Chilowicz

August 4, 2021 2	Austin FC	3–2	Houston Dynamo FC	Austin, TX
8:00 p.m. CDT	Pochettino 7', 45+1'; Domínguez 56'	Report	Cerén (red card) 20'; Pasher 27'; Picault 86'	Stadium: Q2 Stadium; Attendance: 20,738; Referee: Joe Dickerson

August 7, 2021 3	FC Dallas	2–0	Austin FC	Frisco, TX
7:30 p.m. CDT	Hollingshead 50'; Ferreira 63'	Report		Stadium: Toyota Stadium; Attendance: 16,625; Referee: Alan Kelly

August 21, 2021 4	Houston Dynamo FC	2–2	FC Dallas	Houston, TX
7:30 p.m. CDT	Picault 25' (pen.); Vera 72'	Report	Tafari 54'; Pepi 58'	Stadium: BBVA Stadium; Attendance: 13,548; Referee: Allen Chapman

August 29, 2021 4	Austin FC	3–5	FC Dallas	Austin, TX
7:30 p.m. CDT	Cascante 13'; Fagúndez 59'; Ring 68'	Report	Ferreira 5', 38'; Pepi 36', 40'; Obrian 53'	Stadium: Q2 Stadium; Attendance: 20,738; Referee: Jair Marrufo

September 11, 2021 6	Houston Dynamo FC	3–0	Austin FC	Houston, TX
7:30 p.m. CDT	Dorsey 1'; Picault 24', 65'	Report		Stadium: BBVA Stadium; Attendance: 14,070; Referee: Ismail Elfath

September 18, 2021 7	Houston Dynamo FC	3–2	FC Dallas	Houston, TX
7:30 p.m. CDT	Dorsey 5'; Picault 20'; Quintero 59' (pen.)	Report	Obrian 86', 90+4'	Stadium: BBVA Stadium; Attendance: 12,353; Referee: Victor Rivas

October 24, 2021 8	Austin FC	2–1	Houston Dynamo FC	Austin, TX
3:00 p.m. CDT	Maric 6' (o.g.); Driussi 45+3'	Report	Cascante 90+1' (o.g.)	Stadium: Q2 Stadium; Attendance: 20,738; Referee: Tim Ford

October 30, 2021 9	FC Dallas	2–1	Austin FC	Frisco, TX
7:30 p.m. CDT	Ferreira 38'; Jara 80'	Report	Fagúndez 36'	Stadium: Toyota Stadium; Attendance: 16,080; Referee: Silviu Petrescu

=== 2022 ===
2022 results summary
Pos	Team	Pld	W	D	L	GF	GA	GD	Pts
1	Austin FC (C)	4	2	2	0	8	5	+3	8
2	FC Dallas	4	1	3	0	7	6	+1	6
3	Houston Dynamo FC	4	0	1	3	5	9	−4	1

Source: https://copatejas.com/
(C) Champions

Austin FC win FC Dallas win Houston Dynamo FC win Draw

April 23, 2022 1	FC Dallas	2—1	Houston Dynamo FC	Frisco, TX
2:00 p.m. CDT	Ntsabeleng 87'; Quignon 90+3'	Report	Ferreira 33'	Stadium: Toyota Stadium; Attendance: 15,792; Referee: Victor Rivas

April 30, 2022 2	Houston Dynamo FC	1—2	Austin FC	Houston, TX
12:30 p.m. CDT	Ferreira 5'	Report	Pereira 39'; Driussi 66'	Stadium: PNC Stadium; Attendance: 16,296; Referee: Ted Unkel

June 25, 2022 3	Austin FC	2—2	FC Dallas	Austin, TX
8:00 p.m. CDT	Driussi 72'; Hoesen 85'	Report	Arriola 58'; Servania 64'	Stadium: Q2 Stadium; Attendance: 20,738; Referee: Allen Chapman

July 9, 2022 4	Houston Dynamo FC	2—2	FC Dallas	Houston, TX
7:30 p.m. CDT	Úlfarsson 69'; Hadebe 90+11'	Report	Hedges 27'; Ferreira 90+3'; Servania (yellow card) 90+8' (yellow-red card) 90+13'	Stadium: PNC Stadium; Attendance: 21,284; Referee: Jon Freemon

July 12, 2022 5	Austin FC	3–1	Houston Dynamo FC	Austin, TX
8:00 p.m. CDT	Fagúndez 15'; Urruti 57'; Ring 70'	Report	Carrasquilla 11'	Stadium: Q2 Stadium; Attendance: 20,738; Referee: Chris Penso

July 16, 2022 6	FC Dallas	1–1	Austin FC	Frisco, TX
8:00 p.m. CDT	Arriola 42'	Report	Fagúndez 79'	Stadium: Toyota Stadium; Attendance: 16,833; Referee: Armando Villarreal

=== 2023 ===
2023 results summary
Pos	Team	Pld	W	D	L	GF	GA	GD	Pts
1	Austin FC (C)	4	2	0	2	7	3	+4	6
2	Houston Dynamo FC	4	1	2	1	3	5	−2	5
3	FC Dallas	4	1	2	1	2	4	−2	5

Source: https://copatejas.com/
(C) Champions

Austin FC win FC Dallas win Houston Dynamo FC win Draw

May 20, 2023 1	FC Dallas	1–1	Houston Dynamo FC	Frisco, TX
8:30 p.m. CDT	Obrian 53'	Report	Úlfarsson 85'	Stadium: Toyota Stadium; Attendance: 19,096; Referee: Victor Rivas

May 27, 2023 2	Houston Dynamo FC	2–1	Austin FC	Houston, TX
7:30 p.m. CDT	Herrera 37'; Franco 87'	Report	Zardes 22'	Stadium: Shell Energy Stadium; Attendance: 16,055; Referee: Ted Unkel

June 21, 2023 3	Austin FC	3–0	FC Dallas	Austin, TX
7:30 p.m. CDT	Finlay 17'; Fagúndez 42'; Zardes 58'	Report		Stadium: Q2 Stadium; Attendance: 20,738; Referee: Rosendo Mendoza

June 24, 2023 4	Austin FC	3–0	Houston Dynamo FC	Austin, TX
7:30 p.m. CDT	Finlay 22'; Zardes 32'; Cascante 50'	Report		Stadium: Q2 Stadium; Attendance: 20,738; Referee: Victor Rivas

August 26, 2023 5	FC Dallas	1–0	Austin FC	Frisco, TX
7:30 p.m. CDT	Tafari 90+7'	Report	Pereira (yellow card) 45' (yellow-red card) 67'	Stadium: Toyota Stadium; Attendance: 18,267; Referee: Rubiel Vazquez

September 30, 2023 6	Houston Dynamo FC	0–0	FC Dallas	Houston, TX
8:30 p.m. CDT		Report		Stadium: Shell Energy Stadium; Attendance: 18,175; Referee: Ismail Elfath

=== 2024 ===
2024 results summary
Pos	Team	Pld	W	D	L	GF	GA	GD	Pts	PPG
1	FC Dallas (C)	5	3	1	1	9	5	+4	10	2.00
2	Austin FC	6	3	0	3	6	7	−1	9	1.50
3	Houston Dynamo FC	5	1	1	3	2	5	−3	4	0.80

Source: MLS Copa Tejas
(C) Champions

Austin FC win FC Dallas win Houston Dynamo FC win Draw

March 30, 2024 1	Austin FC	2–1	FC Dallas	Austin, TX
7:30 p.m. CDT	Cascante 54'; Rubio 70'	Report	Ansah 51'	Stadium: Q2 Stadium; Attendance: 20,738; Referee: Rosendo Mendoza

April 20, 2024 2	Houston Dynamo FC	0–1	Austin FC	Houston, TX
7:30 p.m. CDT		Report	Rigoni 86'	Stadium: Shell Energy Stadium; Attendance: 20,115; Referee: Rubiel Vazquez

April 27, 2024 3	FC Dallas	2–0	Houston Dynamo FC	Frisco, TX
7:30 p.m. CDT	Musa 55'; Ibeagha 80'	Report		Stadium: Toyota Stadium; Attendance: 19,096; Referee: Lukasz Szpala

May 11, 2024 4	FC Dallas	2–1	Austin FC	Frisco, TX
7:30 p.m. CDT	Musa 4'; Ferreira 56'	Report	Driussi 84' (pen.)	Stadium: Toyota Stadium; Attendance: 19,096; Referee: Jair Marrufo

May 15, 2024 5	Austin FC	1–0	Houston Dynamo FC	Austin, TX
7:30 p.m. CDT	Driussi 87'	Report		Stadium: Q2 Stadium; Attendance: 20,738; Referee: Filip Dujic

May 18, 2024 6	Houston Dynamo FC	1–1	FC Dallas	Houston, TX
7:30 p.m. CDT	Bassi 45+6'	Report	Musa 69'	Stadium: Shell Energy Stadium; Attendance: 19,284; Referee: Tori Penso

July 17, 2024 7	FC Dallas	3–1	Austin FC	Frisco, TX
7:30 p.m. CDT	Arriola 10'; Musa 56' (pen.); Farfan 74'	Report	Zardes 16'; Driussi (red card) 60'	Stadium: Toyota Stadium; Attendance: 20,500; Referee: Armando Villarreal

September 21, 2024 8	Austin FC	0–1	Houston Dynamo FC	Austin, TX
7:30 p.m. CDT		Report	Carrasquilla 83'	Stadium: Q2 Stadium; Attendance: 20,738; Referee: Victor Rivas

=== 2025 ===
2025 results summary
Pos	Team	Pld	W	D	L	GF	GA	GD	Pts	PPG
1	Houston Dynamo FC (C)	4	2	1	1	7	4	+3	7	1.75
2	FC Dallas	4	2	1	1	6	4	+2	7	1.75
3	Austin FC	4	0	2	2	3	8	−5	2	0.50

Source: MLS
(C) Champions

Austin FC win FC Dallas win Houston Dynamo FC win Draw

February 22, 2025 1	Houston Dynamo FC	1–2	FC Dallas	Houston, TX
7:30 p.m. CST	Bassi 18'	Report	Musa 55'; Julio 76'	Stadium: Shell Energy Stadium; Attendance: 18,623; Referee: Armando Villarreal

April 26, 2025 2	Houston Dynamo FC	2–0	Austin FC	Houston, TX
7:30 p.m. CDT	Lingr 61'; Ponce 79'	Report		Stadium: Shell Energy Stadium; Attendance: 17,808; Referee: Chris Penso

May 17, 2025 3	FC Dallas	0–2	Houston Dynamo FC	Frisco, TX
7:30 p.m. CDT		Report	McGlynn 64'; Dorsey 81'	Stadium: Toyota Stadium; Attendance: 11,004; Referee: Tori Penso

August 9, 2025 4	Austin FC	2–2	Houston Dynamo FC	Austin, TX
7:30 p.m. CDT	Ilie 31'; Biro 41'	Report	McGlynn 80' (pen.), 89'	Stadium: Q2 Stadium; Attendance: 20,738; Referee: Alexis Da Silva

August 16, 2025 5	Austin FC	1–1	FC Dallas	Austin, TX
7:30 p.m. CDT	Wolff 51'	Report	Moore 37'	Stadium: Q2 Stadium; Attendance: 20,738; Referee: Armando Villarreal

September 13, 2025 6	FC Dallas	2–0	Austin FC	Frisco, TX
7:30 p.m. CST	Musa 2'; Kamungo 49'	Report		Stadium: Toyota Stadium; Attendance: 11,004; Referee: Victor Rivas

=== 2026 ===
2026 results summary
Pos	Team	Pld	W	D	L	GF	GA	GD	Pts	PPG
1	FC Dallas (C)	4	2	2	0	8	6	+2	8	2.00
2	Houston Dynamo FC	4	1	1	2	8	8	0	4	1.00
3	Austin FC	4	1	1	2	3	5	−2	4	1.00

Source: MLS Copa Tejas
(C) Champions

Austin FC win FC Dallas win Houston Dynamo FC win Draw

March 21, 2026 1	FC Dallas	4–3	Houston Dynamo FC	Frisco, TX
7:30 p.m. CDT	Farrington 6'; Farrington 14'; Holmes 54'; Musa 86'	Report	Guilherme 14'; Sviatchenko 31'; Ennali 33'	Stadium: Toyota Stadium; Attendance: 11,004; Referee: Rosendo Mendoza

April 25, 2026 2	Austin FC	2–0	Houston Dynamo FC	Austin, TX
7:30 p.m. CDT	Nelson 13'; Uzuni 45+2'	Report		Stadium: Q2 Stadium; Attendance: 20,738; Referee: Alexis Da Silva

July 25, 2026 3	Houston Dynamo FC	3–0	Austin FC	Houston, TX
7:30 p.m. CDT	Bogusz 12', 29'; Guilherme 32'	Report		Stadium: Shell Energy Stadium; Attendance: 19,869; Referee: Filip Dujic

August 16, 2026 4	Austin FC	1–2	FC Dallas	Austin, TX
7:30 p.m. CDT	E. Torres 57'	Report	Abubakar 45+2'; Musa 73'	Stadium: Q2 Stadium; Attendance: 20,738; Referee: Ramy Touchan

September 19, 2026 5	FC Dallas	0–0	Austin FC	Frisco, TX
7:30 p.m. CDT		Report		Stadium: Toyota Stadium; Attendance: 10,925; Referee: Allen Chapman

October 17, 2026 6	Houston Dynamo FC	2–2	FC Dallas	Houston, TX
7:30 p.m. CDT	Herrera 49'; Bogusz 90+4' (pen.)	Report	Cappis 12'; Musa 90+11' (pen.); Sarver (red card) 90+12'	Stadium: Shell Energy Stadium; Attendance: 20,112; Referee: Victor Rivas

=== 2027 ===
2027 results summary
Pos	Team	Pld	W	D	L	GF	GA	GD	Pts	PPG
1	Austin FC	0	0	0	0	0	0	0	0	—
2	Houston Dynamo FC	0	0	0	0	0	0	0	0	—
3	FC Dallas	0	0	0	0	0	0	0	0	—

Source: MLS Copa Tejas

Austin FC win FC Dallas win Houston Dynamo FC win Draw

February 20, 2027 1	Austin FC	v	FC Dallas	Austin, TX
7:00 p.m. CDT				Stadium: Q2 Stadium

April 3, 2027 2	Houston Dynamo FC	v	Austin FC	Houston, TX
7:00 p.m. CST				Stadium: Shell Energy Stadium

April 24, 2027 3	FC Dallas	v	Houston Dynamo FC	Frisco, TX
8:00 p.m. CST				Stadium: Toyota Stadium

== Division 2 ==
Copa Tejas Division 2

Club	Titles	Years
Austin Bold FC (Note: Franchise relocated after completion of the 2021 USLC season)	1	2019
El Paso Locomotive FC	3	2021, 2024, 2026
Rio Grande Valley FC (Note: Franchise ceased operations after the 2023 USLC season)	0	
San Antonio FC	3	2022, 2023, 2025

Notes

Year	Champions	Second	Third	Fourth
2019	Austin Bold FC	San Antonio FC	Rio Grande Valley FC	El Paso Locomotive FC
2020	Not held due to COVID–19			
2021	El Paso Locomotive FC	Austin Bold FC	Rio Grande Valley FC	San Antonio FC
2022	San Antonio FC	Rio Grande Valley FC	El Paso Locomotive FC	–
2023	San Antonio FC	Rio Grande Valley FC	El Paso Locomotive FC	–
2024	El Paso Locomotive FC	San Antonio FC	–	–
2025	San Antonio FC	El Paso Locomotive FC	–	–
2026	El Paso Locomotive FC	San Antonio FC	–	–

=== 2019 ===
2019 results summary
Pos	Team	Pld	W	D	L	GF	GA	GD	Pts
1	Austin Bold FC	6	3	2	1	6	4	+2	11
2	San Antonio FC	6	2	2	2	9	7	+2	8
3	Rio Grande Valley FC	6	2	2	2	8	9	−1	8
4	El Paso Locomotive FC	6	0	4	2	4	7	−3	4

Source: https://copatejas.com/

Austin Win El Paso Win Rio Grande Valley Win San Antonio Win Draw

March 23, 2019 1	El Paso	2–2	Rio Grande Valley	El Paso
8:30 p.m. MST	Ross 45+1'; Rebellón (yellow card) 59'; Contreras (yellow card) 72'; Gebhard 78'	USLC Report	Dunwell (yellow card) 47'; Hernandez (yellow card) 66', (goal) 79'; Duvall (yellow card) 69'; Enríquez 90'	Stadium: Southwest University Park; Attendance: 7,458; Referee: Alejandro Aguilera

March 30, 2019 2	Austin	1–0	San Antonio	Del Valle
7:30 p.m. CDT	McFarlane (yellow card) 59'; Kléber 78'	SAN Report	Maguraushe (yellow card) 25'; Hernandez (yellow card) 54'	Stadium: Bold Stadium; Attendance: 5,803; Referee: Yusri Rudolf

April 21, 2019 3	Austin	0–0	El Paso	Del Valle
4:00 p.m. CDT	Okugo (yellow card) 62'	USLC Report	N'Toko (yellow card) 44'; Kiffe (yellow card) 79'	Stadium: Bold Stadium; Attendance: 1,839; Referee: Michael Radchuk

May 25, 2019 4	Rio Grande Valley	3–1	San Antonio	Edinburg
7:30 p.m. CDT	Enríquez 30'; Salazar 36', 58'; Dunwell (yellow card) 74'; Lemoine (yellow card) 90+3'	SAN Report	Guzmán 70'; Yaro (yellow card) 86'	Stadium: H-E-B Park; Attendance: 4,377; Referee: Michael Radchuk

June 22, 2019 5	Rio Grande Valley	0–1	Austin	Edinburg
7:30 p.m. CDT	Castellanos (yellow card) 22'; Adams (yellow card) 83'	USLC Report	Saramutin (yellow card) 32'; McFarlane (yellow card) 41'; Lima 50'; Kléber (yellow card) 55'; Tyrpak (yellow card) 88'; Okugo (yellow card) 90+4'; Restrepo (yellow card) 90+6'	Stadium: H-E-B Park; Attendance: 3,286; Referee: Gustavo Solorio

June 26, 2019 6	San Antonio	0–0	El Paso	San Antonio
7:30 p.m. CDT	Ackon (yellow card) 45'; Barmby (yellow card) 58' (yellow-red card) 63'	SAN Report	Beckie (yellow card) 16'; Ketterer (yellow card) 44'; Gebhard (yellow card) 87'; Gómez (yellow card) 90+3'	Stadium: Toyota Field; Attendance: 6,081; Referee: Rosendo Mendoza

July 3, 2019 7	San Antonio	3–0	Austin	San Antonio
7:30 p.m. CDT	Okugo 8' (o.g.); Bryant (yellow card) 41'; Forbes 50'; Gallegos (yellow card) 64'; Ackon (yellow card) 67'; Parano 70'; Greene (yellow card) 90+2'	SAN Report	Báez (yellow card) 45'; Guadarrama (yellow card) 76'	Stadium: Toyota Field; Attendance: 7,514; Referee: Daniel Gutierrez

July 17, 2019 8	El Paso	1–3	San Antonio	El Paso
7:00 p.m. MST	Fox (yellow card) 13', (goal) 28'; Salgado (yellow card) 90+2'	SAN Report	López 8', 45+3'; Eboussi (yellow card) 34'; Jamieson 52'	Stadium: Southwest University Park; Attendance: 6,128; Referee: Mark Allatin

August 17, 2019 9	San Antonio	2–2	Rio Grande Valley	San Antonio
7:30 p.m. CDT	Barmby 14'; Parano 44'; Greene (yellow card) 68'; López (yellow card) 88'	SAN Report	Fuenmayor (red card) 31'; Martinez (yellow card) 38'; Samuels (yellow card) 45+4'; Castellanos (yellow card) 51'; Small 75'; Ackon 80' (o.g.); Rodriguez (yellow card) 87'; Jackson (yellow card) 90'	Stadium: Toyota Field; Attendance: 7,533; Referee: Sergii Demianchuk

August 24, 2019 10	Rio Grande Valley	1–0	El Paso	Edinburg
7:30 p.m. CDT	Bird 46'	ELP Report	Ryan (yellow card) 56' (yellow-red card) 90+1'	Stadium: H-E-B Park; Attendance: 4,275; Referee: Luis Guardia

September 1, 2019 11	Austin	3–0	Rio Grande Valley	Del Valle
7:30 p.m. CDT	Twumasi 33'; Taylor (yellow card) 55'; Lima 60'; Promise (yellow card) 72', (goal) 87'	AUS Report; USL Report	Corti (red card) 44'; Enríquez (yellow card) 57'; Fuenmayor (yellow card) 77'; Coronado (yellow card) 85'	Stadium: Bold Stadium; Attendance: 1,968; Referee: Kevin Broadley

October 10, 2019 12	El Paso	1–1	Austin	El Paso
8:00 p.m. MST	Monsalvez (yellow card) 42'; Velásquez 76' (pen.)	ELP Report; AUS Report; USL Report	Mallace (yellow card) 35'; Okugo (yellow card) 45+3'; Kléber (yellow card) 53'; Lima (yellow card) 77', (goal) 81'; Taylor (yellow card) 82'; Soto (yellow card) 90+3'	Stadium: Southwest University Park; Referee: Pierre-Luc Lauziere

=== 2020 ===
Due to the coronavirus pandemic and the announcement of the updated format for the remainder of the 2020 USL Championship season, the 2020 Copa Tejas competition was not played-out as originally scheduled. El Paso Locomotive FC was put in Group C while Austin Bold FC, Rio Grande Valley FC, and San Antonio FC were placed in Group D. Therefore, the Copa Tejas was not awarded in 2020.

=== 2021 ===
2021 results summary
Pos	Team	Pld	W	D	L	GF	GA	GD	Pts
1	El Paso Locomotive FC	12	7	2	3	24	16	+8	23
2	Austin Bold FC	12	3	6	3	10	17	−7	15
3	Rio Grande Valley FC	12	3	5	4	17	17	0	14
4	San Antonio FC	12	3	4	5	15	16	−1	13

Source: https://copatejas.com/

Austin Win El Paso Win Rio Grande Valley Win San Antonio Win Draw

May 16, 2021 1	Rio Grande Valley	2–1	San Antonio	Edinburg
7:30 p.m. CDT	Kuzain 42'; Sorto 57'; Robinson (yellow card) 75'; López (yellow card) 90+6'	Report	Patiño (yellow card) 31', (goal) 68'; Lema (yellow card) 45'; Cuello (yellow card) 45+3'; Khmiri (yellow card) 78'	Stadium: H-E-B Park; Attendance: 2,610; Referee: Melvin Rivas

May 22, 2021 2	El Paso	1–0	Rio Grande Valley	El Paso
8:30 p.m. MST	Solignac 1'; Ryan (yellow card) 45+2'; Ross (yellow card) 62'; Mares (yellow card) 77'; Borelli (yellow card) 89'		Amoh (yellow card) 70' (yellow-red card) 80'	Stadium: Southwest University Park; Attendance: 6,325; Referee: Lukasz Szpala

May 29, 2021 3	San Antonio	1–1	Rio Grande Valley	San Antonio
7:30 p.m. CDT	Lema (yellow card) 34'; Epps 40'; Cuello (red card) 80'	Report	Pimentel (yellow card) 42'; J. Sánchez (yellow card) 55'; Azócar 89'; V. Sánchez (yellow card) 90'	Stadium: Toyota Field; Attendance: 3,852; Referee: Jon Freemon

June 3, 2021 4	Austin	0–1	El Paso	Del Valle
8:00 p.m. CDT	Ycaza (yellow card) 9'; Garcia (yellow card) 29'; Hinds (yellow card) 57'; Báez (yellow card) 71'; Okoli (yellow card) 87'	Report	Yuma (yellow card) 39'; Rebellón (yellow card) 51'; Luna 56'; Zendejas (yellow card) 81'; Solignac (yellow card) 90+2'	Stadium: Bold Stadium; Attendance: 791; Referee: Mark Allatin

June 16, 2021 5	Rio Grande Valley	1–2	Austin	Edinburg
7:00 p.m. CDT	Diz Pe (yellow card) 13'; Cerritos 21'; Kuzain (yellow card) 58'; Cabezas (yellow card) 75'; Pimentel (yellow card) 82'	Report	Okali 55'; Okali (yellow card) 90'; Gracia 90+6'	Stadium: H-E-B Park; Attendance: 2572; Referee: Ismir Pekmic

June 19, 2021 6	San Antonio FC	1–1	Rio Grande FC	San Antonio
7:30 p.m. CDT	Dhillon 13'; Lindley (yellow card) 14'; Dhillon (yellow card) 17'; Varela (yellow card) 66'; Lema (yellow card) 90'; Doyle (yellow card) 90+5'	Report	Sorto 22'; Sanchez (yellow card) 58'; Alburquerque (yellow card) 64'; Sanchez (yellow card) 90+1'; Ramsey (yellow card) 90+5'	Stadium: Toyota Stadium; Attendance: 3920; Referee: Elijio Arreguin

June 30, 2021 7	Rio Grande Valley	3–2	El Paso	Edinburg
7:00 p.m. CDT	Manley 5'; Kuzain 61'; Lopez 73'; Vera (yellow card) 87'; Kuzain (yellow card) 90+3'	Report	Aguinaga 31'; Luna (yellow card) 77'; Solignac 82'	Stadium: H-E-B Park; Attendance: 2445; Referee: Brandon Stevis

July 3, 2021 8	San Antonio	0–1	Austin	San Antonio
7:30 p.m. CDT	Doyle (yellow card) 15'; Lindley (yellow card) 41'; Patino (yellow card) 71'; Deplagne (yellow card) 79'	Report	Diouf 2'; Diouf (yellow card) 33'; Gordon (yellow card) 45' Baez (yellow card) 52'; Okoli 60; Panicco (yellow card) 77'; Soto (yellow card) 83'	Stadium: Toyota Field; Attendance: 6243; Referee: Matthew Franz

July 7, 2021 9	Austin	1–1	Rio Grande Valley	Del Valle
8:00 p.m. CDT	Hinds (yellow card) 16'; Sarkodie (yellow card) 45+1'; Sarkodie 48'; Adamolekun (yellow card) 88'	Report	Kuzain (yellow card) 45+2'; Cabezas (yellow card) 45+3'; Pimental (yellow card) 52'; Azocar 62'	Stadium: Bold Stadium; Attendance: 686; Referee: Elijio Arreguin

June 24, 2021 10	Rio Grande Valley	1–1	Austin	Edinburg
8:00 p.m. CDT	Cabezas 8'; Cabezas (yellow card) 56'; Lopez (yellow card) 67'; Deric (yellow card) 85'	Report	Torres (yellow card) 35' (yellow-red card) 50'; Baez (yellow card) 79'; Baez 85'	Stadium: H-E-B Park; Referee: Brad Jensen

July 28, 2021 11	San Antonio	1–2	El Paso	San Antonio
7:30 p.m. CDT	Lindley (yellow card) 23'; Sjoberg (yellow card) 27'; Abu (yellow card) 42'; Sjoberg 74'	Report	Solignac 18'; Bahner (yellow card) 30'; Luna (yellow card) 37'; Ryan (yellow card) 58'; Luna 71'	Stadium: Toyota Field; Attendance: 5,273; Referee: Malik Badawi

July 31, 2021 12	Austin	0–3	San Antonio	Del Valle
8:00 p.m. CDT	Gordon (yellow card) 12'; Ycaza (yellow card) 20'; Okoli (yellow card) 23'; Garcia (yellow card) 29'; Taylor (yellow card) 37'; Hinds (yellow card) 40'; Panicco (yellow card) 67'	Report	Cuello 30'; Gallegos (yellow card) 34'; Abu (yellow card) 45+4'; Deplange (yellow card) 59'; Nathan 69'; Gallegos 74'; Maloney (yellow card) 90+5'	Stadium: Bold Stadium; Attendance: 1,577; Referee: Jervis Atagana

August 4, 2021 13	El Paso	2–0	San Antonio	El Paso
8:00 p.m. MST	Luna 29'; King (yellow card) 37'; Aguinaga (yellow card) 44'; Aguinaga 45+2'; Jerome (yellow card) 68'; Rebellon (yellow card) 70' (yellow-red card) 77'	Report	Deplange (yellow card) 12'; Maloney (yellow card) 56'	Stadium: Southwest University Park; Attendance: 4,688; Referee: Brad Jensen

August 7, 2021 14	El Paso	3–0	Austin	El Paso
7:30 p.m. CDT	Fox 59'; Mares 72'; Carrijo 90+3'	Report	Garcia (yellow card) 86'	Stadium: Southwest University Park; Attendance: 5,348; Referee: Michael Radchuk

August 8, 2021 15	Rio Grande Valley	1–2	San Antonio	Edinburg
8:30 p.m. MST	Azocar 35'; Robinson (yellow card) 38'; Njie (yellow card) 77'; Pimental (yellow card) 79'	Report	Nathan 18'; Khmiri (yellow card) 50'; Nathan 58'; Abu (yellow card) 60'; Cardone (yellow card) 78'	Stadium: H-E-B Park; Attendance: 3,495; Referee: Elvis Osmanovic

August 17, 2021 16	Austin	1–1	Rio Grande Valley	Del Valle
8:00 p.m. CDT	Baez 26'; Diouf (yellow card) 40'; Avila (yellow card) 44'	Report	Diz Pe (yellow card) 8'; Manley (yellow card) 24'; Amoh 35'; Riley (yellow card) 55'	Stadium: Bold Stadium; Attendance: 531; Referee: Tori Penso

August 21, 2021 17	El Paso	3–1	Rio Grande Valley	El Paso
8:30 p.m. MST	Rebellon (yellow card) 7'; Solignac 67'; Velasquez 89'; Mares 90+6'	Report	Murphy (yellow card) 24'; Amoh 38'; Pimentel (yellow card) 82'	Stadium: Southwest University Park; Attendance: 7,017; Referee: Matthew Thompson

August 28, 2021 18	San Antonio	2–1	El Paso	San Antonio
7:30 p.m. CDT	Epps 32'; PC (yellow card) 41'; Dhillon 90+3', (yellow card) 90+3'	Report	Fox (yellow card) 24'; Velasquez 54'	Stadium: Toyota Field; Attendance: 4,883; Referee: Ricardo Fierro

September 7, 2021 19	Austin	2–1	San Antonio	Del Valle
8:00 p.m. CDT	Garcia (yellow card) 36', (goal) 45'; Fernandez 40'; Baez (yellow card) 72'; Avila (yellow card) 83'; Soto (yellow card) 88'	Report	Sjoberg (yellow card) 32'; Dhillon 42'; PC (yellow card) 56'	Stadium: Bold Stadium; Attendance: 650; Referee: Matthew Corrigan

September 22, 2021 20	Austin	2–2	El Paso	Del Valle
8:00 p.m. CDT	Stefano 31'; Guadarrama 90+4'	Report	Luna 70'; Gómez 83'	Stadium: Bold Stadium; Attendance: 1,022; Referee: Natalie Simon

October 6, 2021 21	El Paso	3–3	San Antonio	El Paso
8:00 p.m. MST	King 57'; Ross 73'; Luna 85'	Report	Dhillon 10'; Deplagne 27'; Ford 90+4'	Stadium: Southwest University Park; Attendance: 5,250; Referee: Sergii Demianchuk

October 20, 2021 22	El Paso	3–0	Austin	El Paso
8:00 p.m. MST	Gómez 23'; Solignac 48'; Luna 90'	Report		Stadium: Southwest University Park; Attendance: 5,007; Referee: Kevin Broadley

October 23, 2021 23	San Antonio	0–0	Austin	San Antonio
7:30 p.m. CDT		Report		Stadium: Toyota Field; Attendance: 6,516; Referee: Ismir Pekmic

October 30, 2021 24	Rio Grande Valley	4–1	El Paso	Edinburg
8:30 p.m. CDT	Lopez 7'; Ycaza (yellow card) 14' (goal) 79'; Azocar (yellow card) 45+2'; Edwards 45+4' (yellow card) 45+4' (goal) 59'; Vera (yellow card) 90+1'	Report	Borelli (yellow card) 45'; Herrera 52'	Stadium: H-E-B Park; Attendance: 4,440; Referee: John Griggs

=== 2022 ===
2022 results summary
Pos	Team	Pld	W	D	L	GF	GA	GD	Pts
1	San Antonio FC	4	3	1	0	7	4	+3	10 (Note: Due to the uneven schedule, San Antonio FC's match against RGV on 3/27/22 did not count as a Copa Tejas match.)
2	Rio Grande Valley FC	4	1	2	1	6	5	+1	5
3	El Paso Locomotive FC	4	0	1	3	0	4	−4	1

Source: https://copatejas.com/
Notes:

El Paso Win Rio Grande Valley Win San Antonio Win Draw

April 16, 2022 1	San Antonio FC	1–0	El Paso Locomotive FC	San Antonio
7:30 p.m. CDT	Collier 11'; Giro (yellow card) 38'; Garcia (yellow card) 41'; Maloney (yellow card) 69'; Taintor (yellow card) 90+5'	Report	Brockbank (yellow card) 18'; Borelli (yellow card) 64'; Luna (yellow card) 90+7'	Stadium: Toyota Field; Attendance: 5,167; Referee: Luis Guardia

May 28, 2022 2	Rio Grande Valley FC	2–3	San Antonio FC	Edinburg
7:30 p.m. CDT	Cabezas 41'; Ycaza (yellow card) 56'; López (yellow card) 71'; Hernández (yellow card) 76'; Pimentel (red card) 77'; Ackwei (yellow card) 79'; Malešević (yellow card) 80'; Herrera 90+2'	Report	Dhillon 26', (yellow card) 31', (goal) 87'; Traore (yellow card) 31'; Garcia (yellow card) 43'; Khmiri (yellow card) 45+5'; Taintor 62', (yellow card) 79'; Delem (yellow card) 89'	Stadium: H-E-B Park; Attendance: 3,053; Referee: Melvin Rivas

June 29, 2022 3	Rio Grande Valley FC	0–0	El Paso Locomotive FC	Edinburg
7:30 p.m. CDT	Hernández (yellow card) 83'	Report	Sonupe (yellow card) 32'; Yuma (yellow card) 61' (yellow-red card) 83'; Velásquez (yellow card) 90'	Stadium: H-E-B Park; Attendance: 2,519; Referee: Gerald Flores

July 23, 2022 4	El Paso Locomotive FC	0–1	San Antonio FC	El Paso
8:30 p.m. CDT	Yuma (yellow card) 43'; Gómez (yellow card) 83'; Azcona (yellow card) 88'	Report	Abdul-Salaam (yellow card) 11'; Patiño 47'; Abu (yellow card) 74'; Gomez (yellow card) 81'	Stadium: Southwest University Park; Attendance: 6,333; Referee: Ricardo Fierro

August 20, 2022 5	San Antonio FC	2–2	Rio Grande Valley FC	San Antonio
8:00 p.m. CDT	Khmiri (yellow card) 17'; Abu (yellow card) 18'; Farr (yellow card) 43'; Adeniran (yellow card) 45'; Maloney (yellow card) 53'; Gomez 59'; Bailone (yellow card) 84'; Taintor (yellow card) 90', (goal) 90+6'	Report	Pinzon 34'; Ward 36', (yellow card) 90+5'; Ycaza (yellow card) 80'; Coronado (yellow card) 90+9' (yellow-red card) 90+10'	Stadium: Toyota Field; Attendance: 6,511; Referee: Greg Dopka

September 7, 2022 6	El Paso Locomotive FC	0–2	Rio Grande Valley FC	El Paso
8:00 p.m. CDT	Hinds (yellow card) 13'; Borelli	Report	López 72'; Pinzon 80'; Torres (yellow card) 86'	Stadium: Southwest University Park; Attendance: 7,589; Referee: Mark Allatin

=== 2023 ===
2023 results summary
Pos	Team	Pld	W	D	L	GF	GA	GD	Pts
1	San Antonio FC	4	2	2	0	6	4	+2	8
2	Rio Grande Valley FC	4	1	2	1	7	5	+2	5
3	El Paso Locomotive FC	4	0	2	2	6	10	−4	2

Source: https://copatejas.com/

El Paso Win Rio Grande Valley Win San Antonio Win Draw

June 10, 2023 1	San Antonio FC	2–2	El Paso Locomotive FC	San Antonio, Texas
8:00 p.m. CDT	Taintor 4', (yellow card) 45+3'; Abu (yellow card) 7'; Hernandez (yellow card) 56'; Adeniran 60'; Marcina (yellow card) 67'	Report	Gómez 11'; Navarro (yellow card) 15'; McCue (yellow card) 36'; Solignac (yellow card) 45+2', (goal) 78'	Stadium: Toyota Field; Attendance: 4,706; Referee: Alexis Da Silva

July 12, 2023 2	El Paso Locomotive FC	1–2	San Antonio FC	El Paso, Texas
8:00 p.m. CDT	Calvillo 29' (pen.), (yellow card) 90+6'; Clarhaut (yellow card) 38'; Kostyshyn (yellow card) 38'; Hinds (yellow card) 59'; Borelli (yellow card) 85'; Herrera (yellow card) 90+6'; Lyons (yellow card) 90+6'	Report	Zouhir 58', 62', (yellow card) 90+6'; Batista (yellow card) 80' (yellow-red card) 90+6'; Hernández (yellow card) 90+6'; Oluwaseyi (yellow card) 90+6'	Stadium: Southwest University Park; Attendance: 5,785; Referee: Sergii Demianchuk

July 15, 2023 3	El Paso Locomotive FC	1–1	Rio Grande Valley FC	El Paso, Texas
8:30 pm	Calvillo (yellow card) 22'; Solignac (yellow card) 66'; Zacarías (yellow card) 77'; Rose (yellow card) 80'; Gómez 88'; Navarro (yellow card) 90+6'	Report	Cabrera 38', (yellow card) 41'; Benítez (yellow card) 71'	Stadium: Southwest University Park; Attendance: 5,589; Referee: Abdou Ndiaye

July 29, 2023 4	Rio Grande Valley FC	5–2	El Paso Locomotive FC	Edinburg, Texas
	Davila 7', 20'; Calvillo 34' (o.g.); Cabrera 59'; Kinzner (yellow card) 70'; Torres 74' (pen.); López (yellow card) 86'	Report	Solignac 3' (pen.); Gómez 16', (yellow card) 51'; Zacarías (yellow card) 24'; Calvillo (yellow card) 40'	Stadium: H-E-B Park; Attendance: 4,730; Referee: Alejo Calume

August 16, 2023 5	San Antonio FC	2–1	Rio Grande Valley FC	San Antonio, Texas
8:00 PM CDT	Patiño 13'; Zouhir 30'; Garcia (yellow card) 83'; Hayes (yellow card) 86'	Report	Cerro 11'	Stadium: Toyota Field; Attendance: 6,034; Referee: Sergii Boiko

August 30, 2023 6	Rio Grande Valley FC	0–0	San Antonio FC	Edinburg, Texas
7:00 PM CDT	Ruiz (yellow card) 45'; Ricketts (yellow card) 82'; Cabezas (yellow card) 90'	Report	Patiño (yellow card) 24'; Hayes (yellow card) 67'	Stadium: H-E-B Park; Attendance: 2,731; Referee: Elvis Osmanovic

=== 2024 ===
2024 results summary
Pos	Team	Pld	W	D	L	GF	GA	GD	Pts
1	El Paso Locomotive FC	2	1	1	0	3	2	+1	4
2	San Antonio FC	2	0	1	1	2	3	−1	1

Updated to match(es) played on October 9, 2024. Source: https://copatejas.com/

El Paso Win San Antonio Win Draw

June 5, 2024 1	San Antonio FC	0–1	El Paso Locomotive FC	San Antonio, Texas
8:00 p.m. CDT		Report	Craig 65'	Stadium: Toyota Field; Attendance: 5,805; Referee: Ricardo Fierro

October 9, 2024 2	El Paso Locomotive FC	2–2	San Antonio FC	El Paso, Texas
8:00 p.m. CDT	Burks 83' (o.g.); Lyons 88'	Report	LaCava 53'; Solignac 63'	Stadium: Southwest University Park; Referee: Servando Berna Rico

=== 2025 ===
2025 results summary
Pos	Team	Pld	W	D	L	GF	GA	GD	Pts
1	San Antonio FC	2	2	0	0	7	3	+4	6
2	El Paso Locomotive FC	2	0	0	2	3	7	−4	0

Updated to match(es) played on October 25. Source: https://copatejas.com/

El Paso Win San Antonio Win Draw

July 4 1	El Paso Locomotive FC	1–2	San Antonio FC	El Paso, Texas
TBD	Cabrera (yellow card) 28'; Moreno 67', (yellow card) 77' (yellow-red card) 90+5'; Rui (yellow card) 77'; Alfaro (yellow card) 81'	Report	Agudelo 11', (yellow card) 15'; Medranda (yellow card) 45+4'; Soto (yellow card) 46'; Hernandez (yellow card) 57'; Buckmaster (yellow card) 80'; Taintor (yellow card) 81'; Crognale 83'; Berrón (yellow card) 86'	Stadium: Southwest University Park; Attendance: 8,432; Referee: Thomas Snyder

October 25 2	San Antonio FC	5−2	El Paso Locomotive FC	San Antonio, Texas
8:00 p.m. CDT	Patino 9'; Haakenson 22'; Alfaro 35' (o.g.); D. Hernandez 53'; Taintor 86'	Report	Moreno 7'; Sorto 54'	Stadium: Toyota Field; Attendance: 8,164; Referee: Abdou Ndiaye

=== 2026 ===
2025 results summary
Pos	Team	Pld	W	D	L	GF	GA	GD	Pts
1	El Paso Locomotive FC (C)	2	1	0	1	5	3	+2	3
2	San Antonio FC	2	1	0	1	3	5	−2	3

Updated to match(es) played on August 15, 2026. Source: https://copatejas.com/
(C) Champions

El Paso Win San Antonio Win Draw

April 18 1	El Paso Locomotive FC	2–3	San Antonio FC	El Paso, Texas
9:00pm	Rubin 45+2'; Avila 55'	Report	Crognale 16'; Hernadez 43'; Parano 90'	Stadium: Southwest University Park; Referee: Rodrigo Albuquerque

August 15 2	San Antonio FC	0–3	El Paso Locomotive FC	San Antonio, Texas
9:00 PM ET		Report	Mendez 20', 39'; Farkarlun 44'	Stadium: Toyota Field; Attendance: 7,742; Referee: Matthew Thompson

== Shield ==
Club	Titles	Years
Austin Bold FC (Note: Franchise has since ceased operations after the 2021 USLC season.)	0	
Austin FC	0	
Dallas Trinity FC	1	2025
El Paso Locomotive FC	1	2021
FC Dallas	0	
Houston Dash	0	
Houston Dynamo FC	1	2024
Rio Grande Valley FC (Note: Franchise ceased operations after the 2023 USLC season.)	0	
San Antonio FC	2	2022, 2023

Notes

Year	Champions	Runners-up
2021	El Paso Locomotive FC	San Antonio FC
2022	San Antonio FC	Austin FC
2023	San Antonio FC	Houston Dynamo FC
2024	Houston Dynamo FC	Austin FC
2025	Dallas Trinity FC	Austin FC

2026 results summary
Pos	Team	Pld	PPG
1	El Paso Locomotive FC	30	1.67
2	FC Dallas	33	1.67
3	Houston Dynamo FC	32	1.59
4	San Antonio FC	30	1.50
5	Dallas Trinity FC	28	1.43
6	Houston Dash	29	1.14
7	Austin FC	33	1.03

Updated to match(es) played on October 31, 2026, 2026. Source: MLS StandingsNWSL StandingsUSLC StandingsUSLS Standings

== All scorers ==
=== Division 1 ===
Stats as of October 17, 2026 – Bold denotes still active with team

Position	Name	Team	Goals
1	(Croatia) **Petar Musa**	FC Dallas	9
2	(United States) Fafà Picault	Houston Dynamo FC	6
2	(United States) Jesús Ferreira	FC Dallas	6
2	(Argentina) Sebastian Driussi	Austin FC	6
5	(Colombia) Jáder Obrian	FC Dallas/Austin FC	5
5	(Uruguay) Diego Fagundez	Austin FC	5
5	(United States) Gyasi Zardes	Austin FC	5
8	(United States) Ricardo Pepi	FC Dallas	3
8	(Costa Rica) Julio Cascante	Austin FC	3
8	(United States) Paul Arriola	FC Dallas	3
8	(United States) Griffin Dorsey	Houston Dynamo FC	3
8	(United States) **Jack McGlynn**	Houston Dynamo FC	3
8	(Poland) **Mateusz Bogusz**	Houston Dynamo FC	3
14	(Paraguay) Sebastián Ferreira	Houston Dynamo FC	2
14	(Argentina) Tomás Pochettino	Austin FC	2
14	(Finland) Alexander Ring	Austin FC	2
14	(Iceland) Thorleifur Úlfarsson	Houston Dynamo FC	2
14	(United States) Ethan Finlay	Austin FC	2
14	(United States) Nkosi Tafari	FC Dallas	2
14	(Panama) Adalberto Carrasquilla	Houston Dynamo FC	2
14	(Morocco) Amine Bassi	Houston Dynamo FC	2
14	(United States) **Logan Farrington**	FC Dallas	2
14	(Brazil) **Guilherme**	Houston Dynamo FC	2
14	(Mexico) **Héctor Herrera**	Houston Dynamo FC	2
25	(Paraguay) Cecilio Dominguez	Austin FC	1
25	(Paraguay) Iván Franco	Houston Dynamo FC	1
25	(Zimbabwe) Teenage Hadebe	Houston Dynamo FC	1
25	(United States) Matt Hedges	FC Dallas/Austin FC	1
25	(Netherlands) Danny Hoesen	Austin FC	1
25	(United States) Ryan Hollingshead	FC Dallas	1
25	(Argentina) Franco Jara	FC Dallas	1
25	(South Africa) Tsiki Ntsabeleng	FC Dallas	1
25	(Canada) Tyler Pasher	Houston Dynamo FC	1
25	(Venezuela) **Daniel Pereira**	Austin FC	1
25	(Argentina) Facundo Quignon	FC Dallas	1
25	(Colombia) Darwin Quintero	Houston Dynamo FC	1
25	(United States) Brandon Servania	FC Dallas	1
25	(Argentina) Maximiliano Urruti	Austin FC	1
25	(Argentina) Matías Vera	Houston Dynamo FC	1
25	(Chile) Diego Rubio	Austin FC	1
25	(Argentina) Emiliano Rigoni	Austin FC	1
25	(United States) **Sebastien Ibeagha**	FC Dallas	1
25	(United States) Marco Farfan	FC Dallas	1
25	(Ecuador) **Anderson Julio**	FC Dallas	1
25	(Czech Republic) **Ondřej Lingr**	Houston Dynamo FC	1
25	(Argentina) **Ezequiel Ponce**	Houston Dynamo FC	1
25	(Spain) **Ilie Sánchez**	Austin FC	1
25	(Brazil) **Guilherme Biro**	Austin FC	1
25	(United States) **Owen Wolff**	Austin FC	1
25	(United States) **Shaq Moore**	FC Dallas	1
25	(United States) **Bernard Kamungo**	FC Dallas	1
25	(England) **Osaze Urhoghide**	FC Dallas	1
25	(Brazil) **Erik Sviatchenko**	Houston Dynamo FC	1
25	(Germany) **Lawrence Ennali**	Houston Dynamo FC	1
25	(Albania) **Myrto Uzuni**	Austin FC	1
25	(Canada) **Jayden Nelson**	Austin FC	1
25	(Ghana) **Lalas Abubakar**	FC Dallas	1
25	(United States) **Ervin Torres**	Austin FC	1
25	(United States) **Christian Cappis**	FC Dallas	1

=== Division 2 ===
Stats as of August 18, 2026 – Bold denotes still active with team

Position	Name	Team	Goals
1	(Argentina) Luis Solignac	El Paso Locomotive FC/San Antonio FC	8
2	(United States) Diego Luna	El Paso Locomotive FC	6
2	(Brazil) André Lima	Austin Bold FC	6
2	(United States) Justin Dhillon	San Antonio FC/El Paso Locomotive FC	6
2	**(Colombia) Santiago Patiño**	San Antonio FC	6
6	(Mexico) Aarón Gómez	El Paso Locomotive FC	5
7	(Brazil) Nathan Fogaça	San Antonio FC	4
7	(Venezuela) Juan Carlos Azócar	Rio Grande Valley FC Toros	4
7	(Colombia) Sebastián Velásquez	El Paso Locomotive FC	4
7	**(United States)** **Mitchell Taintor**	San Antonio FC	4
11	(Venezuela) Elvis Amoh	Rio Grande Valley FC Toros	3
11	(Cuba) Frank López	San Antonio FC/Rio Grande Valley FC Toros	3
11	(Canada) Rida Zouhir	San Antonio FC	3
11	(El Salvador) Christian Sorto	Rio Grande Valley FC Toros/El Paso Locomotive FC	3
11	(Argentina) Cristian Parano	San Antonio FC	3
15	(Saint Vincent and the Grenadines) Kyle Edwards	Rio Grande Valley FC Toros	2
15	(United States) Wan Kuzain	Rio Grande Valley FC Toros	2
15	(Mexico) Rodrigo Lopez	Rio Grande Valley FC Toros	2
15	(United States) Dylan Mares	El Paso Locomotive FC	2
15	(Spain) José Aguinaga	El Paso Locomotive FC	2
15	(Mexico) Xavier Báez	Austin Bold FC	2
15	(France) Fabien Garcia	Austin Bold FC/San Antonio FC	2
15	(United States) Marcus Epps	San Antonio FC	2
15	(England) Andrew Fox	El Paso Locomotive FC	2
15	(United States) Jesús Enríquez	Rio Grande Valley FC Toros	2
15	(Belize) Michael Salazar	Rio Grande Valley FC Toros	2
15	(New Zealand) Elliot Collier	San Antonio FC	2
15	(Colombia) Juan David Cabezas	Rio Grande Valley FC Toros	2
15	(Mexico) Christian Pinzón	Rio Grande Valley FC Toros	2
15	(United States) Taylor Davila	Rio Grande Valley FC Toros	2
15	(Colombia) Wilmer Cabrera Jr.	Rio Grande Valley FC Toros/El Paso Locomotive FC	2
15	(United States) **Amando Moreno**	El Paso Locomotive FC	2
15	**(United States)** **Alex Crognale**	San Antonio FC	2
15	**(United States)** **Alex Mendez**	El Paso Locomotive FC	2
35	(Argentina) Emil Cuello	San Antonio FC	1
35	(France) Mathieu Deplagne	San Antonio FC	1
35	(United States) Kortne Ford	San Antonio FC	1
35	(United States) Jose Gallegos	San Antonio FC	1
35	(Sweden) Axel Sjöberg	San Antonio FC	1
35	(Senegal) Ates Diouf	San Antonio FC	1
35	(United States) Collin Fernandez	Austin Bold FC	1
35	(United States) Sonny Guadarrama	Austin Bold FC	1
35	(Brazil) Stefano Pinho	Austin Bold FC	1
35	(United States) Kofi Sarkodie	Austin Bold FC	1
35	(United States) Sean Okoli	Austin Bold FC	1
35	(England) Macauley King	El Paso Locomotive FC	1
35	(United States) Chapa Herrera	El Paso Locomotive FC	1
35	(Brazil) Leandro Carrijó	El Paso Locomotive FC	1
35	(Scotland) Nick Ross	El Paso Locomotive FC	1
35	(El Salvador) Alexis Cerritos	Rio Grande Valley FC Toros	1
35	(United States) Carter Manley	Rio Grande Valley FC Toros/San Antonio FC	1
35	(United States) Derek Gebhard	El Paso Locomotive FC	1
35	(United States) Emilio Ycaza	Rio Grande Valley FC Toros	1
35	(Brazil) Kléber	Austin Bold FC	1
35	(Niger) Isaac Promise	Austin Bold FC	1
35	(Ghana) Ema Twumasi	Austin Bold FC	1
35	(Mexico) Éver Guzmán	San Antonio FC	1
35	(United States) Amobi Okugo	Austin Bold FC	1
35	(Turks and Caicos Islands) Billy Forbes	San Antonio FC	1
35	(United States) Bradford Jamieson IV	San Antonio FC	1
35	(England) Jack Barmby	Rio Grande Valley FC Toros	1
35	(El Salvador) Romilio Hernandez	Rio Grande Valley FC Toros	1
35	(Panama) Carlos Small	Rio Grande Valley FC Toros	1
35	(Ghana) Ebenezer Ackon	Rio Grande Valley FC Toros	1
35	(United States) Eric Bird	Rio Grande Valley FC Toros	1
35	(United States) David Loera	San Antonio FC	1
35	(United States) Dylan Borczak	Rio Grande Valley FC Toros	1
35	(United States) Duilio Herrera	San Antonio FC/Rio Grande Valley FC	1
35	(Trinidad and Tobago) Shannon Gomez	San Antonio FC	1
35	(United States) Akeem Ward	Rio Grande Valley FC Toros	1
35	(United States) Samuel Adeniran	San Antonio FC	1
35	(El Salvador) **Eric Calvillo**	El Paso Locomotive FC	1
35	(United States) José Torres	Rio Grande Valley FC Toros	1
35	(United States) Ian Cerro	Rio Grande Valley FC Toros	1
35	(United States) Brandan Craig	El Paso Locomotive FC	1
35	(United States) Jake LaCava	San Antonio FC	1
35	(United States) Miles Lyons	El Paso Locomotive FC	1
35	(United States) Juan Agudelo	San Antonio FC	1
35	**(United States)** **Nicky Hernandez**	San Antonio FC	1
35	**(United States)** **Luke Haakenson**	San Antonio FC	1
35	(Guatemala) **Rubio Rubín**	El Paso Locomotive FC	1
35	**(United States)** **Alex Crognale**	San Antonio FC	1
35	**(Mexico)** **Jorge Hernandez**	San Antonio FC	1
35	(Liberia) **Jimmy Farkarlun**	El Paso Locomotive FC	1

== Cup rule ==
The Division 1 and Division 2 Copa Tejas format is similar to the Cascadia Cup, although in the Copa Tejas uneven numbers of games can be played - points from all games between the teams count toward the total. Points are earned during the regular season: three for a victory, one for a draw, and no points for a loss. The team that accumulates the most points during the regular USL season, excluding possible U.S. Open Cup match ups and league playoffs, will be awarded the trophy at the conclusion of the league season, and will keep it and bragging rights for a year. If a tiebreaker is necessary, it will be determined from goal differential and other criteria.

The winner each year is decided by these criteria, in order:

- Greater number of points earned in matches between the teams concerned
- Greater goal difference in matches between the teams concerned
- Greater number of goals scored in matches between the teams concerned
- Reapply first three criteria if two or more teams are still tied
- Greater goal difference in all cup matches
- Greater number of goals scored in all cup matches
- Smaller number of disciplinary points in all cup matches (yellow = 1 point, red = 2 points)

== Shield rule ==
The Copa Tejas Shield format is similar to the Supporters Shield awarded by Major League Soccer's Supporters Shield Foundation. Total points for a team across a its regular season will be divided by the number of matches played for an average points per game total. The team with the highest average points per game will be awarded the Copa Tejas Shield. In the event of a tiebreaker, the following criteria will be used to break the tie:

- Goal difference average
- Fewest disciplinary points
- Away goals average
- Away goal difference
- Home goals average
- Home goal difference
- Coin toss if two teams tied and draw straws if three teams tied.
