= 2021 USL Championship playoffs =

Tournament details
- Country: United States
- Teams: 16

Final positions
- Champions: Orange County SC (1st title)
- Runners-up: Tampa Bay Rowdies

Tournament statistics
- Matches played: 14
- Goals scored: 40 (2.86 per match)
- Attendance: 93,029 (6,645 per match)
- Top goal scorer(s): (Haiti) Ronaldo Damus (4 goals)

The 2021 USL Championship playoffs (branded as the 2021 USL Championship Playoffs presented by TwinSpires for sponsorship reasons) was the post-season championship of the 2021 USL Championship. It was the eleventh edition of the USL Championship playoffs. The playoffs began on November 5, and concluded with the USL Championship Final on November 28.

Tampa Bay Rowdies won the regular season with 71 standings points. They were beaten in the Final by Orange County SC, which won its first league title.

Real Monarchs, having won the title in 2019, were the title holders, since the 2020 Final was cancelled due to the COVID-19 outbreak in the Rowdies and the title was not awarded. However, they were eliminated in the regular season as they finished bottom of the Mountain Division table.

== Qualified teams ==
Atlantic Division

- Charlotte Independence
- Miami FC
- Pittsburgh Riverhounds SC
- Tampa Bay Rowdies

Central Division

- Birmingham Legion FC
- FC Tulsa
- Louisville City FC
- Memphis 901 FC

Mountain Division

- Colorado Springs Switchbacks FC
- El Paso Locomotive FC
- Rio Grande Valley FC Toros
- San Antonio FC

Pacific Division

- Oakland Roots SC
- Orange County SC
- Phoenix Rising FC
- San Diego Loyal SC

== Format ==
The top four teams in each division qualified for the playoffs. They began to play on the first weekend on November, featuring a single-elimination, 16-team bracket. Under the revised season format, four division winners in each conference earned hosting rights for the Eastern and Western conference quarterfinals. Following the opening round, hosting rights were determined by regular season record (ranks, then points, then number of wins). All playoff matches were streamed live on ESPN+ except the Championship final on ESPN, ESPN Deportes, and SiriusXM FC.

== Division tables ==
Atlantic Division

Pos	Team	Pld	Pts
1	Tampa Bay Rowdies	32	71
2	Charlotte Independence	32	59
3	Pittsburgh Riverhounds SC	32	58
4	Miami FC	32	54
5	Hartford Athletic	32	41
6	Charleston Battery	32	37
7	New York Red Bulls II	32	28
8	Loudoun United FC	32	15

Source: USL

Central Division

Pos	Team	Pld	Pts
1	Louisville City FC	32	61
2	Birmingham Legion FC	32	60
3	Memphis 901 FC	32	50
4	FC Tulsa	32	47
5	OKC Energy FC	32	37
6	Indy Eleven	32	35
7	Atlanta United 2	32	34
8	Sporting Kansas City II	32	20

Source: USL

Mountain Division

Pos	Team	Pld	Pts
1	El Paso Locomotive FC	32	64
2	San Antonio FC	32	52
3	Colorado Springs Switchbacks FC	32	50
4	Rio Grande Valley FC Toros	32	47
5	New Mexico United	32	46
6	Austin Bold FC	32	42
7	Real Monarchs	32	22

Source: USL

Pacific Division

Pos	Team	Pld	Pts
1	Phoenix Rising FC	32	67
2	Orange County SC	32	52
3	San Diego Loyal SC	32	48
4	Oakland Roots SC	32	41
5	Tacoma Defiance	32	39
6	LA Galaxy II	32	39
7	Sacramento Republic FC	32	36
8	Las Vegas Lights FC	32	21

Source: USL

== Bracket ==
Conference Quarterfinals; November 5–7	Conference Semifinals; November 13
A1	Tampa Bay Rowdies	6
C4	FC Tulsa	2
A1	Tampa Bay Rowdies	1
C2	Birmingham Legion FC	0
C2	Birmingham Legion FC	w/o
A3	Pittsburgh Riverhounds SC
Eastern Conference
A2	Charlotte Independence	3
C3	Memphis 901 FC	1
A2	Charlotte Independence	0
C1	Louisville City FC	1
C1	Louisville City FC	1
A4	Miami FC	0
M1	El Paso Locomotive FC	0
P4	Oakland Roots SC	1
P4	Oakland Roots SC	0 (5)
P2	Orange County SC (p)	0 (6)
P2	Orange County SC	1
M3	Colorado Springs Switchbacks FC	0
Western Conference
M2	San Antonio FC	2
P3	San Diego Loyal SC	0
M2	San Antonio FC	3
M4	Rio Grande Valley FC Toros	1
P1	Phoenix Rising FC	3 (3)
M4	Rio Grande Valley FC Toros (p)	3 (4)

Conference Finals; November 20
A1	Tampa Bay Rowdies (a.e.t.)	3
C1	Louisville City FC	2
P2	Orange County SC (p)	1 (5)
M2	San Antonio FC	1 (3)

USL Championship Final; November 28
A1	Tampa Bay Rowdies	1
P2	Orange County SC	3

== Schedule ==
=== Conference Quarterfinals ===
November 6, 2021 East	Charlotte Independence	3–1	Memphis 901 FC	Charlotte, North Carolina
7:00 PM EDT	Johnson 10'; Fuchs 32'; Bronico (yellow card) 35'; Marveaux 72'	Report	Kissiedou (yellow card) 39'; Murphy 83'; Segbers (yellow card) 89'; Carroll (yellow card) 90+3'	Stadium: American Legion Memorial Stadium; Attendance: 2,723; Referee: Mark Allatin

November 6, 2021 East	Tampa Bay Rowdies	6–2	FC Tulsa	St. Petersburg, Florida
7:30 PM EDT	Guenzatti 21'; Guillén (yellow card) 45+2'; Benton 46' (o.g.); Dos Santos 56' (yellow card) 79'; Fernandes 89', 90+5'; Mkosana 90+2'	Report	Bird (yellow card) 63' (yellow-red card) 72'; Rivas 67'; Suárez 90'	Stadium: Al Lang Stadium; Attendance: 6,262; Referee: Sergii Demianchuk

November 6, 2021 East	Louisville City FC	1–0	Miami FC	Louisville, Kentucky
8:00 PM EDT	Gonzalez 74'; Lancaster (yellow card) 87'; Greig (yellow card) 89'	Report	Craig (yellow card) 24'; Da Silva (yellow card) 72'	Stadium: Lynn Family Stadium; Attendance: 9,097; Referee: Elton García

November 7, 2021 East	Birmingham Legion FC	w/o	Pittsburgh Riverhounds SC	Birmingham, Alabama
5:00 PM EST		Report		Stadium: BBVA Field
Note: Match canceled after multiple Pittsburgh Riverhounds SC players tested positive for COVID-19.

November 5, 2021 West	San Antonio FC	2–0	San Diego Loyal SC	San Antonio, Texas
8:00 PM CDT	Giro (yellow card) 6'; Nathan 14'; Patiño 25'; Epps (yellow card) 46'; Maloney (yellow card) 60'	Report	Stoneman (yellow card) 16'; Martin (yellow card) 81'; Martin (yellow card) 86'	Stadium: Toyota Field; Attendance: 7,003; Referee: Matthew Thompson

November 5, 2021 West	El Paso Locomotive FC	0–1	Oakland Roots SC	El Paso, Texas
7:30 PM MDT	Fox (yellow card) 20'; Luna (yellow card) 78'	Report	Nane (yellow card) 26'; Bokila 76'; Morad (yellow card) 90+3'	Stadium: Southwest University Park; Attendance: 7,201; Referee: Ismir Pekmic

November 6, 2021 West	Orange County SC	1–0	Colorado Springs Switchbacks FC	Irvine, California
7:00 PM PDT	Kuningas (yellow card) 20'; Kiernan (red card) 31'; Damus 45+1'; Orozco (yellow card) 50'; Romero (yellow card) 90+6'	Report	Ockford (yellow card) 27'; Beckford (yellow card) 66'; Hodge (yellow card) 86'	Stadium: Championship Soccer Stadium; Attendance: 4,194; Referee: Lukasz Szpala

November 6, 2021 West	Phoenix Rising FC	3–3 (a.e.t.) (3–4 p)	Rio Grande Valley FC Toros	Chandler, Arizona
7:30 PM MST	Asante 23', 101'; Rodríguez (yellow card) 39' (goal) 54'; Asante (yellow card) 73'; Moar (yellow card) 120+1'	Report	Njie 19' (yellow card) 22'; Cabezas (yellow card) 37'; Pimentel (yellow card) 66'; López 71' (yellow card) 72'; Amoh 109' (pen.)	Stadium: Wild Horse Pass; Attendance: 8,234; Referee: Brandon Stevis
	Penalties
	Bakero (penalty scored); Rodríguez (penalty missed); Quinn (penalty missed); Farrell (penalty scored); Moar (penalty scored)		(penalty scored) Njie; (penalty scored) Ycaza; (penalty scored) Pimentel; (penalty missed) López; (penalty scored) Amoh

=== Conference Semifinals ===
November 13, 2021 East	Tampa Bay Rowdies	1–0	Birmingham Legion FC	St. Petersburg, Florida
7:00 pm EST	Ekra 57'; Scarlett (yellow card) 90+4'	Report	Crognale (yellow card) 38'; Kasim (yellow card) 46'; Crognale (yellow card) 89'; Williams (yellow card) 90+3'	Stadium: Al Lang Stadium; Attendance: 5,949; Referee: Elton García

November 13, 2021 East	Louisville City FC	1–0	Charlotte Independence	Louisville, Kentucky
7:30 pm EST	DelPiccolo (yellow card) 5'; Ownby (yellow card) 21'; McCabe (yellow card) 44'; Lancaster 89' (pen.)	Report	Kelly (yellow card) 34'; Parra (yellow card) 44'; Roascos (yellow card) 76'; Martínez (yellow card) 87'; Pack (yellow card) 87'; Fuchs (yellow card) 90+2'; Johnson (yellow card) 90+6'	Stadium: Lynn Family Stadium; Attendance: 9,155; Referee: Elijio Arreguin

November 13, 2021 West	Orange County SC	0–0 (a.e.t.) (6–5 p)	Oakland Roots SC	Irvine, California
7:00 pm PST		Report	Ward (yellow card) 97'	Stadium: Championship Soccer Stadium; Attendance: 5,218; Referee: Matthew Thompson
	Penalties
	Kuningas (penalty scored); Powers (penalty scored); Casiple (penalty scored); Enevoldsen (penalty scored); Okoli (penalty scored); Damus (penalty scored)		(penalty scored) Morad; (penalty scored) Bokila; (penalty scored) Mbumba; (penalty scored) Nane; (penalty scored) Harish; (penalty missed) Ward

November 13, 2021 West	San Antonio FC	3–1	Rio Grande Valley FC Toros	San Antonio, Texas
8:00 PM CST	Patiño 24', 55'; Nathan 61'; Giro (yellow card) 73'; Farr (yellow card) 84'	Report	Cabezas (yellow card) 43'; Edwards (yellow card) 45+1'; Azócar (yellow card) 64'; Amoh 69' (pen.)	Stadium: Toyota Field; Attendance: 7,966; Referee: Mark Allatin

=== Conference Finals ===
November 20, 2021 East	Tampa Bay Rowdies	3–2 (a.e.t.)	Louisville City FC	St. Petersburg, Florida
7:00 pm EST	Tejada (yellow card) 43'; Dos Santos (yellow card) 73' (goal) 102'; Wyke (yellow card) 83'; Guillén (yellow card) 98'; Mkosana 83', 90+6'	Report	Ownby (yellow card) 5' (goal) 10'; Lasso 23' (o.g.); Gómez (yellow card) 55'; Jimenez (yellow card) 100'	Stadium: Al Lang Stadium; Attendance: 7,120; Referee: Lukasz Szpala

November 20, 2021 West	Orange County SC	1–1 (a.e.t.) (5–3 p)	San Antonio FC	Irvine, California
7:00 pm PST	Damus (yellow card) 6' (goal) 39'; Alston (yellow card) 60'	Report	Fogaça (yellow card) 64'; Epps 67'; Giro (yellow card) 88'; Taintor (yellow card) 105+3'	Stadium: Championship Soccer Stadium; Attendance: 5,386; Referee: Elton García
	Penalties
	Casiple (penalty scored); Powers (penalty scored); Mines (penalty scored); Enevoldsen (penalty scored); Okoli (penalty scored)		(penalty scored) Maloney; (penalty scored) Patiño; (penalty scored) Khmiri; (penalty missed) Dhillon

=== USL Championship Final ===
November 28, 2021	Tampa Bay Rowdies	1–3	Orange County SC	St. Petersburg, Florida
8:30 PM EST	Lasso (yellow card) 16'; Fernandes 57'	Report	Damus 25', 38'; Kuningas 45'; Mines (yellow card) 90+2'	Stadium: Al Lang Stadium; Attendance: 7,521; Referee: Rubiel Vazquez

Championship Game MVP: (Haiti) Ronaldo Damus (Orange County SC)

== Top goalscorers ==
Rank	Player	Club	Goals
1	(Haiti) Ronaldo Damus	Orange County SC	4
2	(Brazil) Leo Fernandes	Tampa Bay Rowdies	3
2	(Zimbabwe) Lucky Mkosana	Tampa Bay Rowdies	3
2	(Colombia) Santiago Patiño	San Antonio FC	3
5	(Ghana) Elvis Amoh	Rio Grande Valley FC Toros	2
5	(Ghana) Solomon Asante	Phoenix Rising FC	2
5	(Cape Verde) Steevan Dos Santos	Tampa Bay Rowdies	2
5	(Brazil) Nathan Fogaça	San Antonio FC	2
9	17 players		1

== Awards ==
- Goal of the Playoffs: (United States) Rodrigo López (RGV)
- Save of the Playoffs: (United States) Jordan Farr (SAN)
