= Joaquín Varela (footballer, born 1997) =

Argentinian association football player

Personal information
- Full name: Héctor Joaquín Varela
- Date of birth: 25 March 1997 (age 29)
- Place of birth: Catamarca, Argentina
- Height: 1.90 m (6 ft 3 in)
- Position: Centre-back

Team information
- Current team: Gimnasia Jujuy
- Number: 6

Youth career
- 2006: Villa Cubas de Catamarca
- 2006–2008: San Lorenzo
- 2008–2014: Proyecto Crecer
- 2014–2017: Newell's Old Boys

Senior career*
Years	Team	Apps	(Gls)
2017–2018	Newell's Old Boys	10	(2)
2018–2020	Godoy Cruz	16	(0)
2020–2022	San Martín de Tucumán	4	(0)
2021	→ San Antonio FC (loan)	17	(2)
2022	→ Gimnasia Mendoza (loan)	17	(1)
2023	Almagro	22	(0)
2024	Deportivo Riestra	0	(0)
2024–2025	Patronato	5	(0)
2025–	Gimnasia Jujuy	2	(0)
- * Club domestic league appearances and goals as of 12:06, 1 May 2024 (UTC)

Héctor Joaquín Varela (born 25 March 1997) is an Argentine professional footballer who plays as a centre-back for Gimnasia Jujuy .

== Career ==
Varela played for Villa Cubas de Catamarca to start his youth career in 2006, though was signed by San Lorenzo soon after. Two years later, Varela was selected for Proyecto Crecer; a project partly supported by Bordeaux. Varela then joined Newell's Old Boys in 2014. He made his senior debut on 10 December 2017 during a loss away to Rosario Central, which preceded Varela scoring his first goal versus Arsenal de Sarandí on 27 February 2018; a 92nd-minute winner in a 2–1 home victory. He made nine further appearances, whilst netting another goal in April against Atlético Tucumán; which was also scored in additional time.

On 2 August 2018, fellow Argentine Primera División side Godoy Cruz signed Varela. His first appearance came against his former employers on 27 August.

== Career statistics ==
As of 14 October 2018.

Club statistics
Club	Season	League			Cup (Note: Includes the Copa Argentina)		League Cup		Continental (Note: Includes the Copa Libertadores and Copa Sudamericana)		Other		Total	
Club	Season	Division	Apps	Goals	Apps	Goals	Apps	Goals	Apps	Goals	Apps	Goals	Apps	Goals
Newell's Old Boys	2017–18	Primera División	10	2	0	0	—		1 (Note: One appearance in the 2018 Copa Sudamericana)	0	0	0	11	2
Godoy Cruz	2018–19	Primera División	1	0	0	0	—		0	0	0	0	1	0
Career total			11	2	0	0	—		1	0	0	0	12	2
