= Jordan Farr =

American soccer player (born 1994)

Personal information
- Date of birth: October 5, 1994 (age 32)
- Place of birth: Salem, Oregon, U.S.
- Height: 6 ft 1 in (1.85 m)
- Position: Goalkeeper

Team information
- Current team: D.C. United
- Number: 24

College career
Years	Team	Apps	(Gls)
2013–2017	Corban Warriors	80	(0)

Senior career*
Years	Team	Apps	(Gls)
2016	Charlotte Eagles	1	(0)
2017	Portland Timbers U23	12	(0)
2018–2021	Indy Eleven	31	(0)
2021	→ San Antonio FC (loan)	3	(0)
2022–2023	San Antonio FC	59	(0)
2024	Tampa Bay Rowdies	32	(0)
2025–	D.C. United	3	(0)
2026	→ Loudoun United (loan)	6	(1)
- * Club domestic league appearances and goals as of October 3, 2026

Jordan Farr (born October 5, 1994) is an American professional soccer player who plays as a goalkeeper for USL Championship side Loudoun United on loan from Major League Soccer club D.C. United.

== Career ==
=== College and amateur ===
Farr played college soccer at Corban University between 2013 and 2017, which included a redshirted 2014 season. He made 80 appearances for the Warriors during his time at Corban.

While at college, Farr played in the USL PDL with both Charlotte Eagles and Portland Timbers U23.

=== Professional ===
On February 2, 2018, Farr signed for United Soccer League side Indy Eleven.

Prior to the 2021 USL Championship Playoffs, San Antonio FC acquired Farr on an emergency loan following an injury to goalkeeper Matt Cardone.

Following the 2021 season, it was announced that Farr's contract option was declined by Indy Eleven.

On January 26, 2022, Farr signed with San Antonio FC. On May 12, 2022, Farr was named USL Championship player of the month for April 2022 due to a league high 18 saves and 4 shutouts throughout the month. On November 8, 2022, after a season in which San Antonio FC won its first USL championship and in which he scored 15 clean sheets, Farr was named 2022 USL Championship Goalkeeper of the Year.

Farr signed with the Tampa Bay Rowdies on January 22, 2024. Farr and the Rowdies advanced to the Eastern Conference Semifinals, losing to Charleston Battery 2–1.

On November 20, 2024, it was announced that Farr would sign with Major League Soccer's D.C. United on a two-year deal.

On June 5, 2026, Loudoun United FC of the USL Championship announced they had acquired Farr on loan from D.C. United for the remainder of the 2026 season.

== Career statistics ==
As of 20 November 2024

Appearances and goals by club, season and competition
Club	Season	League			Playoffs		Cup		Continental		Total	
Club	Season	Division	Apps	Goals	Apps	Goals	Apps	Goals	Apps	Goals	Apps	Goals
Indy Eleven	2019	USL Championship	9	0	3	0	2	0	—		14	0
Indy Eleven	2020	USL Championship	1	0	—		—		—		1	0
Indy Eleven	2021	USL Championship	21	0	—		—		—		21	0
Indy Eleven	Total		31	0	3	0	2	0	—		36	0
San Antonio FC	2021	USL Championship	0	0	3	0	—		—		3	0
San Antonio FC	2022	USL Championship	31	0	3	0	2	0	—		36	0
San Antonio FC	2023	USL Championship	28	0	—		1	0	—		29	0
San Antonio FC	Total		59	0	6	0	3	0	—		68	0
Tampa Bay Rowdies	2024	USL Championship	32	0	2	0	2	0	—		36	0
Tampa Bay Rowdies	Total		32	0	2	0	2	0	—		36	0
D.C. United	2025	Major League Soccer	3	0	0	0	1	0	—		4	0
D.C. United	Total		3	0	0	0	1	0	—		4	0
Career total			93	0	9	0	6	0	0	0	108	0

== Honors ==
San Antonio FC

- USL Championship (regular season): 2022
- USL Championship Final: 2022

Individual

- USL Championship All League First Team: 2022
- USL Championship Goalkeeper of the Year: 2022

== Personal ==
In February 2023, Farr appeared in a commercial for Old Trapper Beef Jerky.
