= Ibrahim Bancé =

Burkinabé footballer

Personal information
- Full name: Ibrahim Bancé
- Date of birth: 15 January 2001 (age 25)
- Place of birth: Krouffian, Burkina Faso
- Height: 1.75 m (5 ft 9 in)
- Position: Midfielder

Team information
- Current team: Marumo Gallants
- Number: 44

Youth career
- ASEC Mimosas

Senior career*
| Years | Team | Apps | (Gls) |
| 2018–2023 | ASEC Mimosas | | |
| 2019 | → Helsingborg (loan) | 6 | (0) |
| 2021 | → Real Monarchs (loan) | 24 | (2) |
| 2023 | RC Abidjan | | |
| 2023–2025 | Stade d'Abidjan | | |
| 2025– | Marumo Gallants | 5 | (0) |

International career^{‡}
| 2019–2021 | Burkina Faso U20 | 3 | (0) |
| 2019– | Burkina Faso | 2 | (0) |
- * Club domestic league appearances and goals as of 4 January 2026 ‡ National team caps and goals as of 6 September 2019

Ibrahim Bancé (born 15 January 2001) is a Burkinabé professional footballer who plays as a midfielder for Marumo Gallants in the South African Premiership and the Burkina Faso national team.

== Professional career ==
On 10 July 2019, Bancé joined Swedish club Helsingborgs IF on a loan deal from ASEC Mimosas for the rest of 2019 with an option to buy. Bancé made his professional debut with Helsingborgs in a 5–0 Allsvenskan loss to IFK Norrköping on 25 August 2019. On 2 December 2019 it was confirmed, that Helsingborg had decided not to trigger his buying option and Bancé returned to ASEC with a total of seven first team games for the Swedish club.

On 29 March 2021, Bancé signed on loan with USL Championship, side Real Monarchs for their 2021 season.

== International career ==
Bancé made his debut for the Burkina Faso national football team in a friendly 0–0 tie with the DR Congo on 9 June 2019.
