= Kortne Ford =

American soccer player

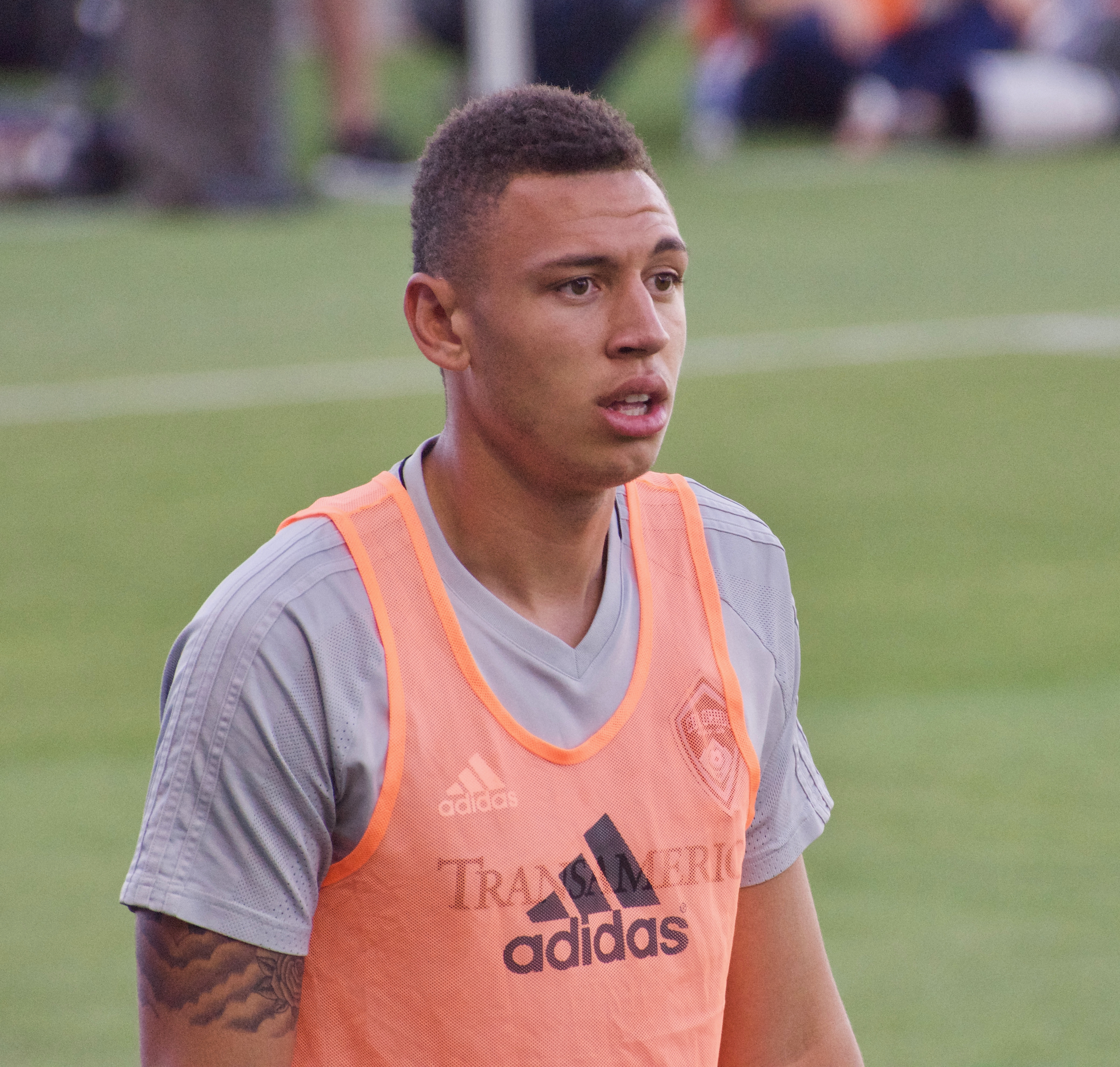
- Ford with Colorado Rapids in 2017

Personal information
- Date of birth: January 26, 1996 (age 30)
- Place of birth: Olathe, Kansas, United States
- Height: 6 ft 2 in (1.88 m)
- Position: Center-back

Youth career
- –2012: Colorado Storm North
- 2012–2014: Colorado Rapids

College career
Years	Team	Apps	(Gls)
2014–2016	Denver Pioneers	62	(5)

Senior career*
Years	Team	Apps	(Gls)
2017–2021	Colorado Rapids	35	(1)
2021	→ San Antonio FC (loan)	13	(4)
2022–2023	Sporting Kansas City	14	(0)
2024	Sporting Kansas City II	0	(0)
Total		62	(5)
- * Club domestic league appearances and goals as of April 3, 2024

Kortne Thompson-Ford (born January 26, 1996) is an American former professional soccer player who played as a center-back.

== Early life ==
Kortne Ford spent his early life in Olathe, Kansas where he made the Kansas City Wizards academy team. In 2008, he moved with his mother to Colorado at the age of 12.

== Career ==
=== College ===
Ford played three years of college soccer at the University of Denver between 2014 and 2016. In his three seasons at the University of Denver, Ford was a two-time All-Summit League First Team selection and was a Top Drawer Soccer Second Team All-America in 2016.

=== Professional ===
Ford signed a homegrown player deal with Colorado Rapids on January 6, 2017. He made his professional debut on April 9, 2017, playing 83-minutes in a 3–1 loss to Sporting Kansas City. He scored his first professional goal on May 27, 2017, also against Sporting Kansas City, in a 1–0 victory for the Rapids.

Ford played every minute of Colorado's Concacaf Champions League games against Toronto FC in February 2018. On March 3, Ford suffered a sprained MCL in his left knee. Ford returned to action on July 1, playing 29 minutes in a 1–0 win at Vancouver Whitecaps FC. Ford started the next 12 MLS matches for Colorado, finishing the season with 1,141 minutes across 15 appearances.

Ford did not appear in 2019 and underwent successful knee surgery on July 21, 2019. Ford did not appear in 2020 and underwent successful knee surgery on Aug. 25.

Ford was loaned to San Antonio FC on August 19, 2021. 1,042 days after his last professional appearance, Ford made his debut for San Antonio on August 21, 2021.

On January 14, 2022, it was announced Ford would be signing with Sporting Kansas City on a one-year deal with the option to extend into the 2023 and 2024 seasons.

On July 15, 2022, Ford was suspended ten games and fined twenty percent of his annual salary after testing positive for a performance-enhancing substance.

== Career statistics ==
=== Club ===
As of match played June 22, 2022

Appearances and goals by club, season and competition
Club	Season	League			National cup		Continental		Total	
Club	Season	Division	Apps	Goals	Apps	Goals	Apps	Goals	Apps	Goals
Colorado Rapids	2017	Major League Soccer	20	1	1	0	—		21	1
Colorado Rapids	2018	Major League Soccer	15	0	—		2	0	17	0
Colorado Rapids	2019	Major League Soccer	0	0	—		—		0	0
Colorado Rapids	2020	Major League Soccer	0	0	—		—		0	0
Colorado Rapids	2021	Major League Soccer	0	0	—		—		0	0
Colorado Rapids	Total		35	1	1	0	2	0	38	1
San Antonio FC (loan)	2021	USL Championship	16	4	—		—		16	4
Sporting Kansas City	2022	Major League Soccer	12	0	2	1	—		14	1
Career total			63	5	3	1	2	0	68	6
