= Jose Gallegos (soccer) =

American soccer player

Personal information
- Full name: Jose Gallegos
- Date of birth: September 22, 2001 (age 25)
- Place of birth: San Antonio, Texas, United States
- Height: 1.76 m (5 ft 9 in)
- Positions: Attacking midfielder; winger

Team information
- Current team: Botev Vratsa
- Number: 10

Youth career
- San Antonio FC

Senior career*
Years	Team	Apps	(Gls)
2019–2021	San Antonio FC	59	(10)
2022–2025	Sønderjyske	84	(9)
2025–	Botev Vratsa	32	(1)
- * Club domestic league appearances and goals as of 06:38, 28 May 2026 (UTC)

Jose Gallegos (born September 22, 2001) is an American professional soccer player who plays as an attacking midfielder for Bulgarian First League club Botev Vratsa.

== Club career ==
On April 25, 2019, Gallegos signed with USL Championship side San Antonio FC after spending time in their academy setup.

In 2020 was a finalist for the USL Championship Young Player of the Year award. In March 2021 Gallegos spent two weeks training with Bayern Munich.

On January 27, 2022, Gallegos was transferred to Danish Superliga side SønderjyskE on a deal until 2026.

In July 2025, Gallegos joined Bulgarian First League club Botev Vratsa.

== International career ==
Born in the United States to Mexican parents, Gallegos holds United States and Mexican citizenship, making him eligible to represent either the United States or Mexico.

== Career statistics ==
=== Club ===
As of May 21, 2022

Club	Season	League			National cup		Continental		Other		Total	
Club	Season	Division	Apps	Goals	Apps	Goals	Apps	Goals	Apps	Goals	Apps	Goals
San Antonio FC	2019	USL	14	1	2	0	–		–		16	1
San Antonio FC	2020	USL	16	2	–		–		1	0	17	2
San Antonio FC	2021	USL	29	7	–		–		3	0	32	7
San Antonio FC	Total		59	10	2	0	–		4	0	65	10
Sønderjyske	2021–22	Danish Superliga	13	1	2	0	–		–		15	1
Career total			72	11	4	0	0	0	4	0	80	11
