= Jáder Obrian =

Colombian footballer (born 1995)

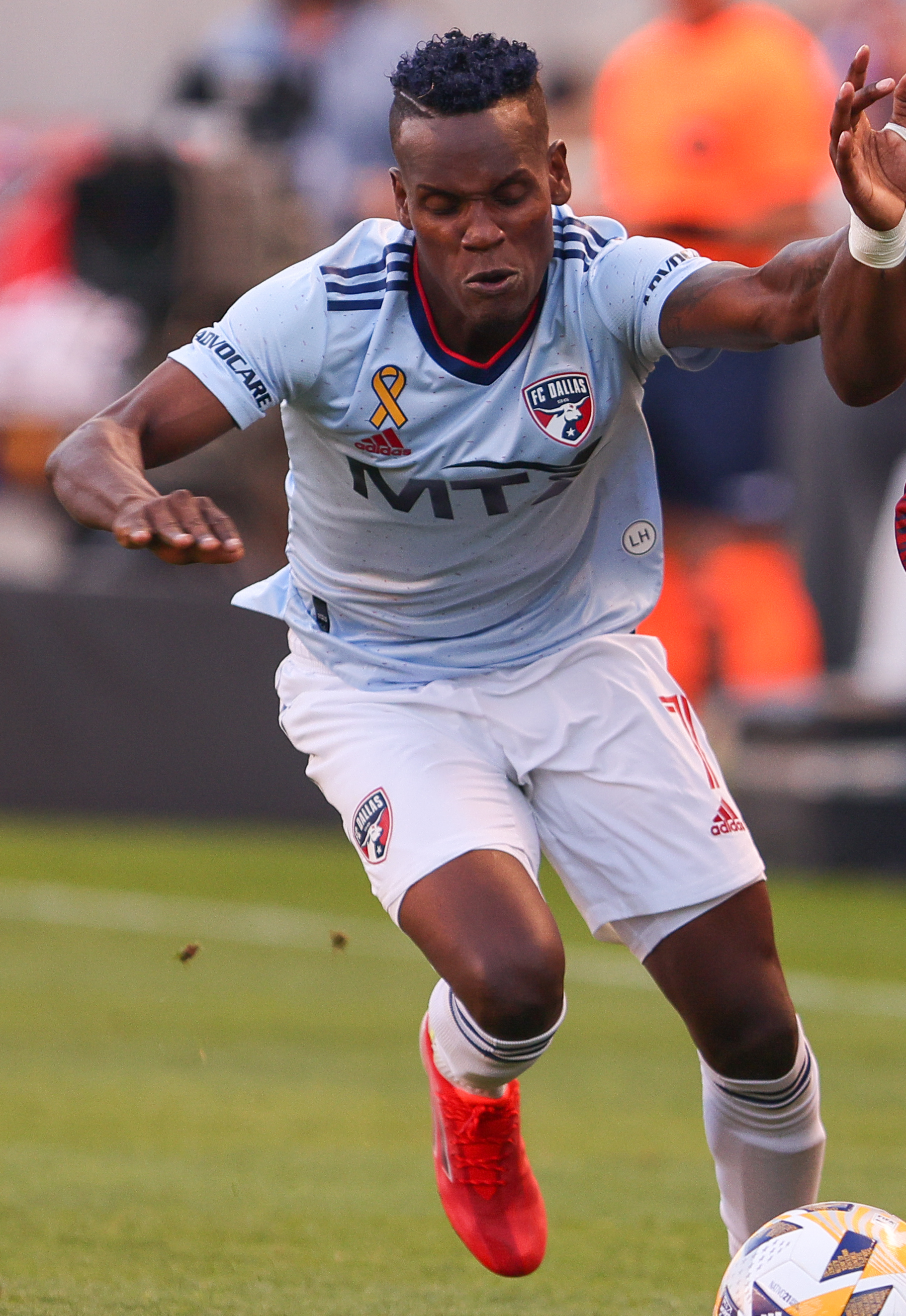
- Obrian with FC Dallas in 2021

Personal information
- Full name: Jáder Rafael Obrian Arias
- Date of birth: 18 May 1995 (age 31)
- Place of birth: María La Baja, Colombia
- Height: 1.65 m (5 ft 5 in)
- Positions: Winger; attacking midfielder

Team information
- Current team: Independiente Santa Fe
- Number: 77

Youth career
- Uniautónoma

Senior career*
Years	Team	Apps	(Gls)
2015	Uniautónoma	6	(0)
2016–2018	Deportes Tolima	29	(0)
2018	→ Cúcuta Deportivo (loan)	10	(3)
2019–2020	Águilas Doradas	61	(24)
2021–2023	FC Dallas	94	(17)
2024–2026	Austin FC	65	(7)
2026–	Independiente Santa Fe	2	(0)
- * Club domestic league appearances and goals as of 15:02, 22 April 2026 (UTC)

Jáder Rafael Obrian Arias (born 18 May 1995) is a Colombian footballer who plays as a winger for Categoría Primera A club Independiente Santa Fe.

== Career ==
Obrian spent time with Uniautónoma, Deportes Tolima, Cúcuta Deportivo and Águilas Doradas, and FC Dallas before joining Austin on 14 December 2023.

== Career statistics ==
=== Club ===
As of match played 2 November 2025

Appearances and goals by club, season and competition
Club	Season	League			League Cup (Note: Appearances in MLS Cup Playoffs)		National cup (Note: Appearances in Copa Colombia and U.S. Open Cup)		Continental		Other		Total	
Club	Season	Division	Apps	Goals	Apps	Goals	Apps	Goals	Apps	Goals	Apps	Goals	Apps	Goals
Uniautónoma	2015	Primera A	6	0	—		1	0	—		—		7	0
Deportes Tolima	2016	Primera A	13	0	—		6	0	2 (Note: Appearance(s) in Copa Sudamericana)	0	—		21	0
Deportes Tolima	2017	Primera A	11	0	—		6	0	0	0	—		17	0
Deportes Tolima	2018	Primera A	5	0	—		—		—		—		5	0
Deportes Tolima	Total		36	0	—		13	0	2	0	—		50	0
Cúcuta Deportivo (loan)	2018	Primera B	10	3	—		4	0	—		—		14	3
Águilas Doradas	2019	Primera A	39	11	—		2	0	4	2	—		45	13
Águilas Doradas	2020	Primera A	22	13	—		2	1	—		—		24	14
Águilas Doradas	Total		71	27	—		8	1	4	2	—		83	30
FC Dallas	2021	MLS	34	9	0	0	0	0	0	0	—		34	9
FC Dallas	2022	MLS	31	2	1 (Note: Appearances in MLS Cup playoffs)	0	2	1	0	0	—		34	3
FC Dallas	2023	MLS	29	6	3	1	1	0	0	0	4 (Note: Appearances in Leagues Cup)	0	37	7
FC Dallas	Total		94	17	4	1	3	1	0	0	4	0	106	19
Austin FC	2024	MLS	34	7	—		—		—		2	1	36	8
Austin FC	2025	MLS	31	0	1	0	3	0	—		—		35	0
Austin FC	Total		65	7	1	0	3	0	0	0	2	0	71	7
Career total			266	51	5	1	27	2	6	2	6	1	310	57
