= Jasser Khmiri =

Tunisian footballer

Personal information
- Full name: Jasser Khmiri
- Date of birth: 27 July 1997 (age 29)
- Place of birth: Tunis, Tunisia
- Height: 1.92 m (6 ft 4 in)
- Position: Defender

Team information
- Current team: Olympique de Béja

Youth career
- Stade Tunisien

Senior career*
Years	Team	Apps	(Gls)
2016–2019	Stade Tunisien	36	(3)
2019–2021	Vancouver Whitecaps	6	(0)
2021	→ San Antonio (loan)	19	(0)
2022–2023	San Antonio	25	(0)
2023–2024	Étoile du Sahel	9	(0)
2024-	Olympique de Béja	0	(0)

International career^{‡}
2018	Tunisia U20	1	(0)
2020–	Tunisia	1	(0)
Medal record
Representing Tunisia
Men's football
FIFA Arab Cup
Runner-up	2021 Qatar
- * Club domestic league appearances and goals as of 3 January 2024 ‡ National team caps and goals as of 9 October 2020

Jasser Khmiri (born 27 July 1997) is a Tunisian professional footballer who plays as a defender for Tunisian Ligue Professionnelle 1 club Olympique Béja.

== Club career ==
In February 2019, Khimiri joined Major League Soccer side Vancouver Whitecaps. In doing so he became the first Tunisian player to play in Major League Soccer.

In March 2021, he went on loan to San Antonio of the USL Championship for the 2021 season.

Following the 2021 season, Vancouver Whitecaps declined their contract option on Khmiri.

== International career ==
Khmiri made his national team debut on 9 October 2020 in a friendly against Sudan.
