= Nathan Fogaça =

Brazilian footballer

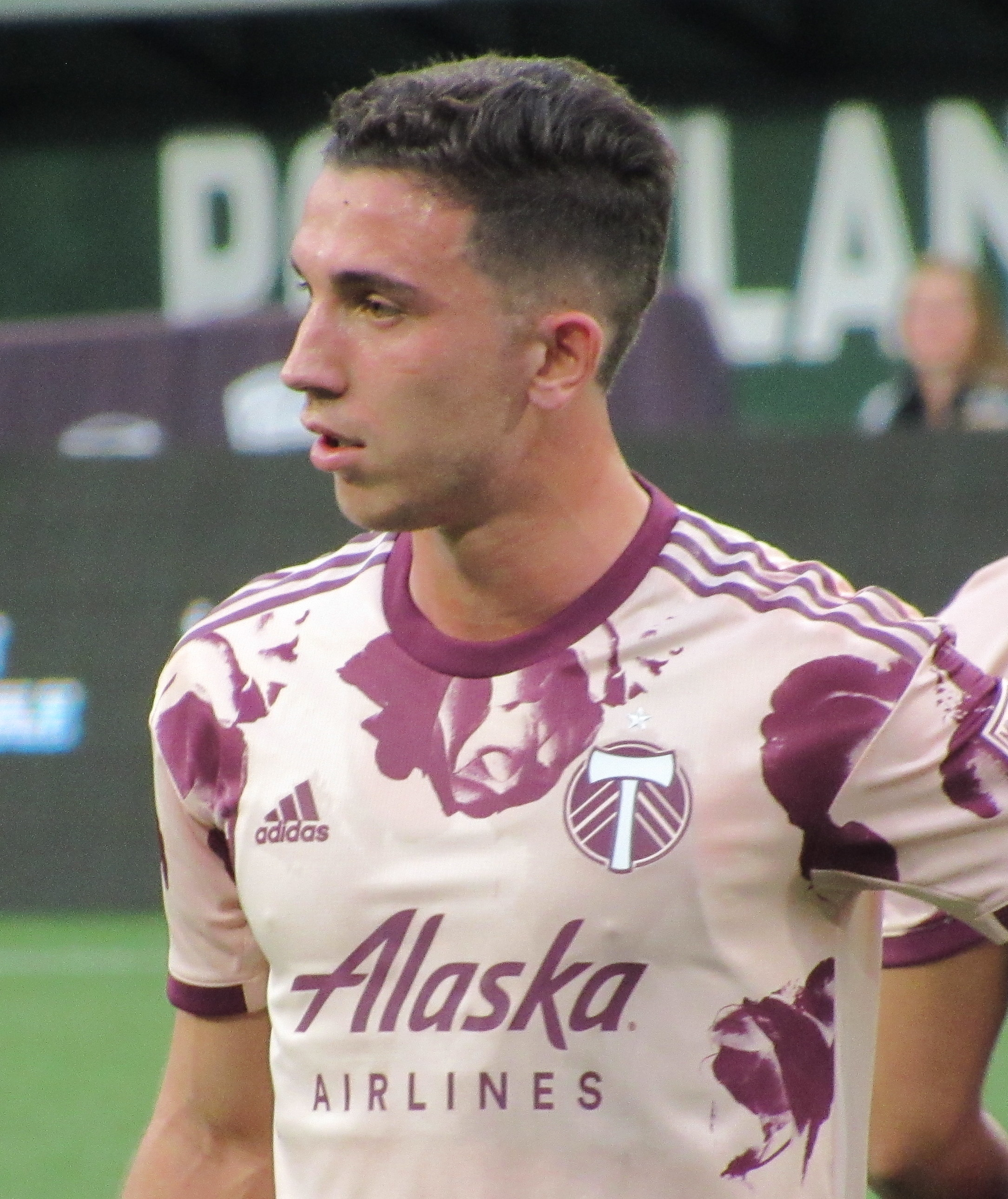
- Fogaça with the Portland Timbers in 2022

Personal information
- Full name: Nathan Uiliam Fogaça
- Date of birth: 9 June 1999 (age 27)
- Place of birth: Palmeira, Brazil
- Height: 1.78 m (5 ft 10 in)
- Position: Forward

Team information
- Current team: Fortaleza
- Number: 17

Youth career
- 2013–2017: Coritiba

Senior career*
Years	Team	Apps	(Gls)
2018–2022	Coritiba	40	(1)
2021	→ San Antonio FC (loan)	34	(13)
2022–2024	Portland Timbers 2	8	(4)
2022–2024	Portland Timbers	43	(4)
2023	→ San Antonio FC (loan)	6	(2)
2024	Operário Ferroviário	13	(4)
2025	Novorizontino	24	(6)
2026	Mirassol	15	(2)
2026–	Fortaleza	0	(0)
- * Club domestic league appearances and goals as of 9 April 2026

Nathan Uiliam Fogaça (born 9 June 1999), is a Brazilian professional footballer who plays as a forward for Fortaleza.

== Career ==
Nathan came through the youth ranks at Coritiba and was called up to the senior side from the under-19s in May 2018. He made his professional debut a month later on 5 June 2018, coming on as a second-half substitute in the 1–0 2018 Campeonato Brasileiro Série B win against CRB. On 24 July 2018 he scored his first professional goal; the winner in the Série B match against Goiás. In April 2021, Fogaça joined American side San Antonio FC on loan for the 2021 season.

In April 2022, Fogaça was signed to a two-year contract by Portland Timbers 2. A month later, he signed with the club's first team who compete in Major League Soccer.
