= Justin Dhillon =

American soccer player

Personal information
- Full name: Justin Shane Dhillon
- Date of birth: June 6, 1995 (age 31)
- Place of birth: Rancho Santa Margarita, California, U.S.
- Height: 1.93 m (6 ft 4 in)
- Position: Forward

Youth career
- 2011–2013: LA Galaxy

College career
Years	Team	Apps	(Gls)
2013–2016	Cal Poly Mustangs	73	(23)

Senior career*
Years	Team	Apps	(Gls)
2015	PSA Elite		
2016	Golden State Force	3	(1)
2017–2018	LA Galaxy II	39	(9)
2019	Tacoma Defiance	14	(6)
2019–2020	Seattle Sounders	6	(0)
2019–2020	→ Tacoma Defiance (loan)	12	(7)
2021–2023	San Antonio FC	80	(16)
2024	El Paso Locomotive	17	(3)
2024–2025	Colorado Springs Switchbacks	23	(7)
- * Club domestic league appearances and goals as of November 4, 2024

Justin Dhillon (born June 6, 1995) is an American professional soccer player.

== Career ==
Dhillon began his career with the LA Galaxy Academy team where he led the Under 16 academy to win the USSDA National Championship for the first time in club history scoring 24 goals in 2011. In his three years with the academy, Dhillon scored 72 goals in all competitions. During this time, Dhillon also appeared for the United States Under 18 Men's National Team. Following this, Dhillon played four years of college soccer at California Polytechnic State University between 2013 and 2016. While at Cal Poly, Dhillon appeared for PSA Elite and USL PDL side FC Golden State Force.

On January 13, 2017, Dhillon signed a professional contract with LA Galaxy II, a USL affiliate club of LA Galaxy.

On March 15, 2019, Dhillon joined USL side Tacoma Defiance. He acted as a leader for the Tacoma Defiance, providing a bigger target up front than the squad had been used to. On May 21, 2019, he scored the fastest goal in USL history, scoring in just 9.17 seconds. Seattle Sounders FC added him to their first team roster on June 28, 2019 to help bolster the roster after the injury of Will Bruin.

On January 15, 2021, it was announced that Dhillon had signed with USL Championship side San Antonio FC for the 2021 season.

Dhillon joined rival club El Paso Locomotive in December 2023.

In August 2024, Dhillon was traded to Colorado Springs Switchbacks in exchange for Wahab Ackwei. On June 17, 2025, Dhillon and Colorado Springs mutually agreed to terminate his deal at the club citing "personal reasons".

== Honors ==
Seattle Sounders FC

- MLS Cup: 2019

Colorado Springs Switchbacks

- Western Conference (USL Championship): 2024
- USL Championship: 2024
