= Matt Cardone =

American soccer player (born 1993)

Personal information
- Date of birth: June 18, 1993 (age 33)
- Place of birth: San Antonio, Texas, U.S.
- Height: 6 ft 3 in (1.91 m)
- Position: Goalkeeper

College career
Years	Team	Apps	(Gls)
2011–2014	Trinity Tigers	82	(0)

Senior career*
Years	Team	Apps	(Gls)
2015	San Antonio Scorpions	4	(0)
2016–2022	San Antonio FC	108	(0)
- * Club domestic league appearances and goals as of November 7, 2021

Matt Cardone (born June 18, 1993) is an American former soccer player who played for San Antonio FC in the USL Championship.

== Early life and education ==
Cardone was born in San Antonio, Texas. He played college soccer at Trinity University between 2011 and 2014, where he was twice named All-America.

== Professional career ==
After a trial with Major League Soccer's Orlando City SC, Cardone signed with North American Soccer League side San Antonio Scorpions on April 17, 2015. The club ceased operations in December 2015. Then on February 4, 2016, Cardone was signed by the United Soccer League's newest franchise, San Antonio FC.

On June 29, 2022, Cardone, the last member remaining from San Antonio FC's inaugural squad, announced his retirement from soccer, effective with the conclusion of the July 2, 2022 match against Charleston Battery. As of the date of his retirement, Cardone held club records for appearances (109), saves (328), clean sheets (26), and minutes played (9,650). In USL Championship history, he ranked eighth all-time with 323 regular-season saves, tied for most saves with a single franchise, and third in keeper appearances with a franchise.
