= Santiago Patiño =

Colombian footballer (born 1997)

Personal information
- Full name: Santiago Pizano Patiño
- Date of birth: 10 March 1997 (age 29)
- Place of birth: Medellín, Colombia
- Height: 6 ft 1 in (1.85 m)
- Position: Forward

Team information
- Current team: San Antonio FC
- Number: 9

College career
Years	Team	Apps	(Gls)
2015–2018	FIU Panthers	69	(37)

Senior career*
Years	Team	Apps	(Gls)
2016	Kraze United	4	(5)
2017	SIMA Águilas	7	(4)
2018	Seattle Sounders U23	14	(9)
2019–2020	Orlando City	13	(2)
2020	→ Cimarrones de Sonora (loan)	11	(1)
2021–2022	San Antonio FC	35	(19)
2023	Avaí	13	(2)
2023–2024	San Antonio FC	12	(7)
2024	Ho Chi Minh City	11	(4)
2024–2025	Al-Merrikh SC	0	(0)
2025–	San Antonio FC	31	(2)

International career
2019	Colombia U23		
- * Club domestic league appearances and goals as of October 31, 2026

Santiago Patiño (born 10 March 1997) is a Colombian footballer who plays as a forward for San Antonio FC.

Having played college soccer for the FIU Panthers, he was selected third overall in the 2019 MLS SuperDraft by Orlando City.

== Club career ==
=== Youth and college ===
Patiño was born in Medellín, Colombia. When he was 9 years old, Patiño's parents split and he chose to live with his father, playing in the junior teams of the football clubs his father transferred to. When he was 12 years old, Patiño moved to Orlando, Florida with his mother where he played for Orlando City's Development Academy and Freedom High School.

He played college soccer at Florida International University from 2015 to 2018, scoring 37 goals in 69 matches. He was a three time All-Conference USA selection and named MAC Hermann Trophy semifinalist in his junior year.

Prior to his professional deal, Patiño spent the summer of 2016 in the NPSL with Kraze United and also played in the PDL with both SIMA Águilas and Seattle Sounders U23.

=== Orlando City ===
Before they selected him in the draft, Orlando City had tried to sign Patiño as a Homegrown Player but the move was controversially blocked by MLS. The team's Executive VP of soccer operations Luiz Muzzi continued to argue the case throughout the Combine and events leading up to the draft stating "We feel like the league did us wrong on this one." Orlando eventually decided to draft him with their #3 overall pick despite the selection being seen as a reach with Orlando City head coach James O'Connor describing the move as "a message to all our other homegrowns." He made his professional debut on 16 March 2019 in a 3–1 defeat to Montreal Impact, coming on as a 74th-minute substitute and assisting Dom Dwyer's goal in stoppage time. He scored his first professional goal 7 July 2019, entering as an 81st-minute substitute and scoring with his first touch of the game from a corner to put Orlando 2–1 up against Philadelphia Union. Orlando ended up conceding a 90th-minute equalizer to tie 2–2. He had his contract option declined as part of the club's end of season roster moves in December 2020.

==== Loan to Cimarrones de Sonora ====
On 21 August 2020, Patiño joined Mexican team Cimarrones de Sonora in Liga de Expansión MX for the rest of the year. He made his debut for the club as a substitute on 7 September in a 2–0 win over Dorados, making his first start on 16 September in a 1–0 defeat to Atlante. He scored his first goal on 22 September 2020, a 90th minute conciliation goal in a 2–1 defeat to Correcaminos.

=== San Antonio FC ===
On 6 January 2021, Patiño signed as a free agent with USL Championship team San Antonio FC. He debuted for the club on 2 May 2021 in a 3–0 win over Colorado Springs, in which Patiño scored a hat-trick. Patiño scored in the 101st minute of the 2022 USL Championship Western Conference Playoffs Final and played in the USL Championship Final on 13 November 2022. In that game, Patiño scored two goals and led his team to a 3–1 victory against Louisville City FC; for his efforts Patiño was named the USL Championship Final Most Valuable Player.

== International ==
In August 2019, Patiño received his first international call up to the Colombia U23 training camp ahead of the Tokyo 2020 Olympics.

== Personal life ==
Santiago is the son of former professional goalkeeper Milton Patiño. His uncle, Jairo Patiño, also played football and was capped internationally for Colombia.

== Career statistics ==
=== Club ===
As of 14 November 2022

Club	Season	League			Cup		Other		Total	
Club	Season	Division	Apps	Goals	Apps	Goals	Apps	Goals	Apps	Goals
Kraze United	2016	NPSL	4	5	0	0	—		4	5
SIMA Águilas	2017	PDL	7	4	0	0	—		7	4
Seattle Sounders U23	2018	PDL	14	9	0	0	—		14	9
Orlando City	2019	MLS	11	2	2	0	—		13	2
Orlando City	2020	MLS	2	0	0	0	2 (Note: MLS is Back Tournament knockout stage.)	0	4	0
Cimarrones de Sonora (loan)	2020–21	Liga de Expansión MX	11	1	0	0	—		11	1
San Antonio FC	2021	USL Championship	14	8	0	0	—		14	8
San Antonio FC	2022	USL Championship	20	11	0	0	—		20	11
Career total			83	40	2	0	2	0	87	40
