= 2020 Rio Grande Valley FC season =

Rio Grande Valley FC Toros
2020 season
- Head coach: Gerson Echeverry
- USL Championship: Group D: 4th Conference: 16th
- USL Playoffs: Did not qualify
- Copa Tejas: Not held
- Average home league attendance: 1,324 (Overall); 2,300 (Pre-Covid); 836 (Post-Covid)
- Biggest win: RGV 2–0 ATX (Sept. 30); RGV 4–2 OKC (Oct. 3)
- Biggest defeat: RGV 1–5 LA (March 8)
Home colors	Away colors	Third colors

The 2020 Rio Grande Valley FC Toros season was the 5th season for Rio Grande Valley FC Toros in USL Championship (USLC), the second-tier professional soccer league in the United States and Canada. This article covers the period from November 18, 2019, the day after the 2019 USLC Playoff Final, to the conclusion of the 2020 USLC Playoff Final, scheduled for November 12–16, 2020.

== Club ==
Note: Flags indicate national team as defined under FIFA eligibility rules; some limited exceptions apply. Players may hold more than one non-FIFA nationality. Squad correct as of January 10, 2020.

No.	Pos.	Nation	Player
1	GK	BEL	Nico Corti
2	MF	USA	Carlos Vivero
3	DF	USA	Robert Coronado
4	DF	USA	Robert Castellanos
6	MF	COL	David Cabrera
7	MF	COL	Camilo Monroy
8	MF	SLV	Romilio Hernandez
10	MF	USA	Victor Garza
11	FW	PER	Jesús Enríquez
12	MF	USA	Brad Dunwell
14	DF	USA	Zach Jackson
15	MF	COL	Andres Arcila
16	DF	USA	Andrew Samuels
18	MF	COL	Sergio Mena
19	MF	USA	Nico Lemoine
20	DF	USA	Conor Donovan
22	DF	COL	Héctor Copete
23	FW	MEX	Aldo Quintanilla
27	MF	USA	Kevin Rodriguez
30	MF	USA	Isidro Martinez
32	DF	NZL	Kyle Adams
58	FW	PAN	Carlos Small (on loan from Árabe Unido)
99	GK	USA	Ben Willis

Signed to first team contract with MLS affiliate Houston Dynamo.
Houston Dynamo academy player.

== Competitions ==
=== Exhibitions ===
February 2 Preseason 1	Rio Grande Valley FC Toros	v	Houston Baptist Huskies	Edinburg, Texas
1:00PM				Stadium: H-E-B Park
Note: Result not made public.

February 8 Preseason 2	Rio Grande Valley FC Toros	0–5	Houston Dynamo	Edinburg, Texas
7:00PM		Report	Martínez 23' (Lundqvist); Manotas 37' (Figueroa); Salazar 93', 111'; McNamara 118' (pen.)	Stadium: H-E-B Park

February 15 Preseason 3	Austin Bold FC	2–2	Rio Grande Valley FC Toros	Austin, Texas
6:00PM	Trialist #1; Trialist #2	Report; Report	McLaughlin; Trialist	Stadium: Bold Stadium

February 22 Preseason 4	SMU Mustangs	2–4	Rio Grande Valley FC Toros	Houston, Texas
1:00PM	45'	Report	20'; Beckford 25'; Trialist 51'; Trialist 88'	Stadium: Houston Sports Park

February 28 Preseason 5	San Antonio FC	v	Rio Grande Valley FC Toros	San Antonio, Texas
1:00PM				Stadium: STAR Soccer Complex

=== USL Championship ===
==== Standings — Group D ====
Pos	Team	Pld	W	D	L	GF	GA	GD	Pts	PPG	Qualification
1	San Antonio FC	16	10	3	3	30	14	+16	33	2.06	Advance to USL Championship Playoffs
2	FC Tulsa	15	6	7	2	21	16	+5	25	1.67	Advance to USL Championship Playoffs
3	Austin Bold FC	16	5	7	4	30	27	+3	22	1.38	
4	Rio Grande Valley FC Toros	14	2	3	9	17	28	−11	9	0.64	
5	OKC Energy FC	16	1	7	8	12	29	−17	10	0.63	

Source: USL

==== Match results ====
On January 9, 2020, the USL announced the 2020 season schedule.

March 8 1	Rio Grande Valley FC Toros	1–5	LA Galaxy II	Edinburg, Texas
6:30 PM	Prpa (yellow card) 19', (goal) 85'	Report	Koreniuk 13', 67'; Dunbar 30'; Williams 53'; Cuevas 88'	Stadium: H-E-B Park; Attendance: 2,300; Referee: Tori Penso

In the preparations for the resumption of league play following the shutdown prompted by the coronavirus pandemic, the remainder of RGVFC's schedule was announced on July 2.

July 11 2	El Paso Locomotive FC	1–0	Rio Grande Valley FC Toros	El Paso, Texas
8:30 PM CDT	Beckie (yellow card) 30'; Monsalvez (yellow card) 38'; Mares (yellow card) 78', (goal) 83'	Report	Murphy (yellow card) 79'; Castellanos (yellow card) 85'; Legault (yellow card) 90+5'	Stadium: Southwest University Park; Referee: Ismir Pekmic

July 19 3	Rio Grande Valley FC Toros	1–1	San Antonio FC	Edinburg, Texas
8:00 PM CDT	Legault (yellow card) 60'; Beckford (yellow card) 78'; Taiberson 90+4'	Report	Parano 3'; Victor Giro (yellow card) 73'; Taintor (yellow card) 90'; Di Renzo (yellow card) 90+5'	Stadium: H-E-B Park; Referee: Melvin Rivas

July 22 4	OKC Energy FC	1–1	Rio Grande Valley	Oklahoma City, Oklahoma
7:00 PM CDT	López (yellow card) 62', (goal) 88'; Ellis-Hayden (yellow card) 63'; Hernández (yellow card) 90+10'	Report	Beckford 11'; Kibato (yellow card) 20'; Coronado (yellow card) 90+7'; Taiberson (yellow card) 90+8'	Stadium: Taft Stadium; Attendance: 1,423; Referee: Michael Cap

July 25 5	San Antonio FC	1–0	Rio Grande Valley FC Toros	San Antonio, Texas
8:00 PM CDT	Victor Giro (yellow card) 36'; Di Renzo 60'	Report	Rocha (yellow card) 9'; Rodriguez (yellow card) 45+1'	Stadium: Toyota Field; Referee: Elton Garcia

August 1 6	Rio Grande Valley FC Toros	1–2	FC Tulsa	Edinburg, Texas
8:00 PM CDT	Castellanos 71'; Adams (yellow card) 73'	Report	Marlon 26'; Bird (yellow card) 28'; Martinez 74' (pen.) da Costa (yellow card) 90+1'; Boakye (yellow card) 90+2'	Stadium: H-E-B Park; Referee: Elton Garcia

August 8 7	Austin Bold FC	4–1	Rio Grande Valley FC Toros	Austin, Texas
8:00 PM CDT	Jome 27', 67'; Diouf 38'; Restrepo (yellow card) 59'; Twumasi (yellow card) 80'; Forbes 90+3'	Report	Coronado (yellow card) 2' (yellow-red card) 24'; Kibato 3'; Murphy (yellow card) 29'; Taiberson (yellow card) 90'	Stadium: Austin Bold Stadium; Referee: Luis Guardia

August 15 8	OKC Energy FC	0–0	Rio Grande Valley	Oklahoma City, Oklahoma
7:00 PM CDT	Ellis-Hayden (yellow card) 14'	Report		Stadium: Taft Stadium; Attendance: 1,425; Referee: Nima Saghafi

August 22 9	Rio Grande Valley FC Toros	2–3	Austin Bold FC	Edinburg, Texas
8:00 PM CDT	Kibato (yellow card) 22'; Obregón 58'; Jimenez 78', (yellow card) 90+5'	Report	Forbes 16'; Diouf 21', 53'; Troncoso (yellow card) 38'; Garcia (yellow card) 65'	Stadium: H-E-B Park; Referee: Gerald Flores

August 29 10	Rio Grande Valley FC Toros	1–3	San Antonio FC	Edinburg, Texas
8:00 PM CDT	Castellanos 35'; McLaughlin (yellow card) 45+6'; Martinez (yellow card) 65'; Hoffmann (yellow card) 80'; Coronado (yellow card) 90+5'	Report	Smith 3'; Solignac 20'; Taintor (yellow card) 30'; PC (yellow card) 41'; Herivaux (yellow card) 53'; Yaro (yellow card) 68'; Di Renzo 90+3'; Bailone (penalty missed) 90+5'	Stadium: H-E-B Park; Referee: Malik Badawi

September 2 11	FC Tulsa	2–1	Rio Grande Valley FC Toros	Tulsa, Oklahoma
7:00 PM CDT	Suárez 25', 68'; Marlon (yellow card) 27'; Bird (yellow card) 43'; Moloto (yellow card) 75'; Zguro (yellow card) 84'	Report	Prpa 28'	Stadium: ONEOK Field; Attendance: 1,836; Referee: Matthew Corrigan

September 5 12	San Antonio FC	3–2	Rio Grande Valley FC Toros	San Antonio, Texas
8:00 PM CDT	Solignac 1'; Gorskie 17'; Bailone 22'; Parano (yellow card) 81'	Report	Edwards 10'; Beckford 59'; Murphy (yellow card) 83'	Stadium: Toyota Field; Attendance: 813; Referee: Héctor Hernández

September 12 13	Rio Grande Valley FC Toros	P–P	Austin Bold FC	Edinburg, Texas
8:00 PM CDT				Stadium: H-E-B Park
Note: Match postponed due to a positive covid-19 test in the RGVFC organization.

September 19 14	Rio Grande Valley FC Toros	P–P	FC Tulsa	Edinburg, Texas
8:00 PM CDT				Stadium: H-E-B Park
Note: Match postponed due to a positive covid-19 test in the RGVFC organization.

September 23 15	New Mexico United	P–P	Rio Grande Valley FC Toros	Albuquerque, New Mexico
TBA PM CDT				Stadium: Isotopes Park
Note: Match postponed due to a positive covid-19 test in the RGVFC organization.

September 30 13	Rio Grande Valley FC Toros	2–0	Austin Bold FC	Edinburg, Texas
8:00 PM CDT	Hoffmann (yellow card) 36'; Edwards 41'; Garza (yellow card) 90+6'; Obregón 90+8' (pen.)	Report	Watson (yellow card) 40'; Taylor (yellow card) 45+4'; Diouf (yellow card) 72'	Stadium: H-E-B Park; Attendance: 716; Referee: Gerald Flores
Note: Re-schedule of postponed September 12 match.

October 3 16	Rio Grande Valley FC	4–2	OKC Energy FC	Edinburg, Texas
7:30 PM CDT	Edwards 6'; Azócar 39'; Amico 43' (o.g.); Obregón 67'	Report	Cato 12'; Brown 83'	Stadium: H-E-B Park; Attendance: 956; Referee: Melvin Rivas

=== U.S. Open Cup ===
Due to their hybrid affiliation with the Dynamo, RGVFC is one of 15 teams expressly forbidden from entering the Cup competition.

=== Statistics ===
As of September 4, 2020 Source: us.soccerway.com

Numbers after plus-sign(+) denote appearances as a substitute.

==== Appearances and goals ====
No.	Pos	Nat	Player	Total		USL Championship Regular Season		Playoffs	
No.	Pos	Nat	Player	Apps	Goals	Apps	Goals	Apps	Goals
4	DF	(United States) USA	Robert Castellanos	11	2	11+0	2	0	0
7	MF	(United States) USA	Isidro Martinez	11	0	10+1	0	0	0
16	FW	(United States) USA	Garrett McLaughlin	11	1	8+3	1	0	0
31	MF	(Jamaica) JAM	Deshane Beckford	11	1	5+6	1	0	0
2	DF	(United States) USA	Carter Manley	10	0	10+0	0	0	0
3	DF	(United States) USA	Robert Coronado	10	0	9+1	0	0	0
22	MF	(Canada) CAN	Kembo Kibato	10	1	7+3	1	0	0
40	FW	(Honduras) HON	Juan Carlos Obregón Jr.	10	1	5+5	1	0	0
12	GK	(United States) USA	Paul Blanchette	9	0	9+0	0	0	0
14	MF	(United States) USA	Luka Prpa	9	2	6+3	2	0	0
29	MF	(United States) USA	Christian Lucatero	8	0	5+3	0	0	0
6	MF	(United States) USA	James Murphy	8	0	5+3	0	0	0
9	FW	(Saint Vincent and the Grenadines) VIN	Kyle Edwards	8	1	2+6	1	0	0
11	MF	(United States) USA	Kevin Rodriguez	7	0	5+2	0	0	0
27	DF	(United States) USA	Jonathan Jimenez	7	1	1+6	1	0	0
32	DF	(New Zealand) NZL	Kyle Adams	6	0	6+0	0	0	0
37	MF	(Brazil) BRA	Taiberson	6	1	4+2	1	0	0
28	DF	(Sweden) SWE	Erik McCue	4	0	3+1	0	0	0
8	MF	(Germany) GER	Timo Mehlich	4	0	2+2	0	0	0
20	DF	(Canada) CAN	Émile Legault	3	1	2+1	1	0	0
18	MF	(United States) USA	Ian Hoffmann	2	0	2+0	0	0	0
5	DF	(United States) USA	Diego Rocha	2	1	1+1	1	0	0
1	GK	(Ireland) EIR	Ryan Coulter	1	0	1+0	0	0	0
10	MF	(United States) USA	Victor Garza	1	0	1+0	0	0	0
