= 2020 San Antonio FC season =

San Antonio FC
2020 season
- Owner: Spurs Sports & Entertainment
- Head coach: Alen Marcina
- Stadium: Toyota Field
- USLC: Group D: 1st Overall: 6th
- USLC Playoffs: Conference Quarterfinals
- U.S. Open Cup: Cancelled
- Copa Tejas: Not held
- Top goalscorer: League: Luis Solignac (8 goals); All: Luis Solignac (8 goals)
- Highest home attendance: 7,020 vs Real Monarchs (March 7, 2020)
- Lowest home attendance: 813 (Note: Capacity limited due to the COVID-19 pandemic in the United States.) vs Rio Grande Valley FC Toros (September 5, 2020)
- Average home league attendance: League: 2,393 (Overall); 7,020 (Pre-Covid); 1,236 (Post-Covid); Playoffs: 2,175
- Biggest win: 4–0 (August 19 vs. OKC Energy FC)
- Biggest defeat: 2–1 (September 12 at El Paso Locomotive FC); 1–0 (September 26 at FC Tulsa); 2–1 (October 4 at Austin Bold FC); 0–1 (October 10 vs. New Mexico United)
Home colors

San Antonio FC played their fifth season in 2020. Including the San Antonio Thunder of the original NASL and the former San Antonio Scorpions of the modern NASL, it was the 11th season of professional soccer in San Antonio. The club played in the USL Championship, the second division of the United States soccer league system, and were scheduled to participate in the U.S. Open Cup before it was postponed and ultimately cancelled due to the COVID-19 pandemic. This was the first season without Darren Powell as head coach. Former assistant coach Alen Marcina was named head coach on December 9, 2019.

== Club ==
=== Coaching staff ===
Position	Staff
Head coach	(Canada) Alen Marcina
SAFC Pro Academy Director & Assistant coach	(Wales) Nick Evans
Director of Goalkeeping	(Mexico) Juan Lamadrid
Equipment Manager	(United States) Rashad Moore
Assistant coach	(United States) Ryan Roushandel
Athletic trainer	(United States) Jesse Lowrance
High Performance Coordinator	(United States) Sean Arters

Source: San Antonio FC

=== Other information ===
Owner	(United States) Spurs Sports & Entertainment
Chairman	(United States) Julianna Hawn Holt
Managing Director	(United States) Tim Holt
Ground (capacity and dimensions)	Toyota Field (8,200 / 110x70 yards)
Training Ground	S.T.A.R. Soccer Complex

Source: San Antonio FC

== Squad information ==
=== First team squad ===
As of October 10, 2020.

Squad No.	Name	Nationality	Position(s)	Date of birth (age)
Goalkeepers
37	Matt Cardone	(United States)	GK	June 18, 1993 (age 33)
99	Carlos Mercado	(United States)	GK	September 27, 1999 (age 26)
Defenders
4	Joshua Yaro	(Ghana)	DF	November 18, 1994 (age 31)
15	Liam Doyle	(Isle of Man)	DF	July 1, 1992 (age 34)
20	Mitchell Taintor	(United States)	DF	September 11, 1994 (age 32)
23	Blake Smith	(United States)	DF	January 17, 1991 (age 35)
27	Hunter Gorskie	(United States)	DF	June 27, 1991 (age 35)
30	Kai Greene	(United States)	DF	July 7, 1993 (age 33)
31	Connor Maloney	(United States)	DF	May 18, 1995 (age 31)
45	Sebastian Mercado	(United States)	DF	April 13, 2003 (age 23)
47	Josh Ramsey	(United States)	DF	August 22, 2002 (age 24)
Midfielders
6	PC	(Brazil)	MF	March 10, 1994 (age 32)
10	Cristian Parano	(Argentina)	MF	August 16, 1999 (age 27)
14	Zachary Herivaux	(Haiti)	MF	February 1, 1996 (age 30)
18	Ethan Bryant	(United States)	MF	August 20, 2001 (age 25)
21	Leo Torres	(United States)	MF	January 22, 2004 (age 22)
22	Santiago Viera	(Uruguay)	MF	June 4, 1998 (age 28)
32	Hayden Partain	(United States)	MF	October 14, 1994 (age 31)
44	Rockey Perez	(United States)	MF	January 8, 2004 (age 22)
Forwards
7	Gonzalo Di Renzo	(Argentina)	FW	December 30, 1995 (age 30)
9	Luis Solignac	(Argentina)	FW	February 16, 1991 (age 35)
17	Jose Gallegos	(United States)	FW	September 22, 2001 (age 24)
25	Ignacio Bailone	(Argentina)	FW	January 20, 1994 (age 32)
46	Fabrizio Bernal	(United States)	FW	June 30, 2003 (age 23)
77	Jordan Perruzza	(Canada)	FW	January 16, 2001 (age 25)

== Player movement ==
=== In ===
Pos	Player	Previous club	Fee	Date	Source
MF	(Argentina) Cristian Parano	(United States) San Antonio FC	Option exercised	December 13, 2019	
DF	(Ghana) Ebenezer Ackon	(United States) San Antonio FC	Option exercised	December 17, 2019	
DF	(United States) Blake Smith	(Canada) Pacific FC	Undisclosed	December 23, 2019	
DF	(United States) Hunter Gorskie	(United States) Loudoun United FC	Undisclosed	January 2, 2020	
MF	(United States) Jesús Enríquez	(United States) Rio Grande Valley FC Toros	Undisclosed	January 3, 2020	
DF	(United States) Connor Maloney	(United States) Columbus Crew SC	Undisclosed	January 6, 2020	
GK	(United States) Matt Cardone	(United States) San Antonio FC	Re-signed	January 8, 2020	
DF	(Ghana) Joshua Yaro	(United States) San Antonio FC	Re-signed	January 9, 2020	
DF	(United States) Kai Greene	(United States) San Antonio FC	Re-signed	January 13, 2020	
MF	(United States) Hayden Partain	(United States) Sacramento Republic FC	Undisclosed	January 14, 2020	
MF	(United States) Leo Torres	(United States) San Antonio FC	Undisclosed	January 21, 2020	
FW	(United States) Jose Gallegos	(United States) SAFC Pro Academy	Undisclosed	January 21, 2020	
MF	(Brazil) PC	(Canada) Vancouver Whitecaps FC	Undisclosed	January 22, 2020	
MF	(Haiti) Zachary Herivaux	(United States) New England Revolution	Undisclosed	January 24, 2020	
FW	(Argentina) Luis Solignac	(United States) Chicago Fire FC	Undisclosed	January 31, 2020	
FW	(Argentina) Ignacio Bailone	(Argentina) Chacarita Juniors	Undisclosed	February 6, 2020	
DF	(United States) Mitchell Taintor	(United States) Sacramento Republic FC	Undisclosed	February 19, 2020	
FW	(United States) Fabrizio Bernal	(United States) SAFC Pro Academy	Undisclosed	March 3, 2020	
DF	(United States) Jacob Castro	(United States) SAFC Pro Academy	Undisclosed	March 3, 2020	
DF	(United States) Sebastian Mercado	(United States) SAFC Pro Academy	Undisclosed	March 3, 2020	
MF	(United States) Rocky Perez	(United States) SAFC Pro Academy	Undisclosed	March 3, 2020	
DF	(United States) Josh Ramsey	(United States) Solar SC	Undisclosed	March 3, 2020	
FW	(Cameroon) Tabort Etaka Preston	(United States) Las Vegas Lights FC	Undisclosed	March 4, 2020	
GK	(United States) Carlos Mercado	(United States) Incarnate Word Cardinals	Undisclosed	March 6, 2020	
DF	(Isle of Man) Liam Doyle	(United States) Memphis 901 FC	Undisclosed	September 18, 2020	
MF	(United States) Ethan Bryant	(Belgium) K.S.V. Roeselare	Undisclosed	September 18, 2020	

=== Out ===
Pos	Player	Transferred To	Fee	Date	Source
FW	(United States) Alex Bruce	(United States) North Texas SC	Undisclosed	December 6, 2019	
MF	(England) Jack Barmby	(United States) Phoenix Rising FC	Undisclosed	December 10, 2019	
GK	(Canada) Jonathan Viscosi	(Sweden) IK Sirius Fotboll	Undisclosed	December 12, 2019	
MF	(Brazil) Pecka	(United States) North Carolina FC	Undisclosed	December 24, 2019	
FW	(Mexico) Éver Guzmán	(United States) Hartford Athletic	Undisclosed	January 9, 2020	
DF	(England) Johnny Fenwick	(United States) Las Vegas Lights FC	Undisclosed	February 28, 2020	
MF	(United States) Jesús Enríquez	Unattached	Mutual Termination	August 21, 2020	
FW	(Cameroon) Tabort Etaka Preston	Unattached	Mutual Termination	August 21, 2020	

=== Loan in ===
Pos	Player	Loaned From	Start	End	Source
MF	(Uruguay) Santiago Viera	(Uruguay) Liverpool Montevideo	January 15, 2020	End of season	
FW	(Argentina) Gonzalo Di Renzo	(Argentina) Club Atlético Lanús	January 23, 2020	End of season	
DF	(Canada) Callum Montgomery	(United States) FC Dallas	February 11, 2020	October 10, 2020	
GK	(Canada) Dayne St. Clair	(United States) Minnesota United FC	February 12, 2020	August 15, 2020	
DF	(Sweden) Axel Sjöberg	(United States) Columbus Crew SC	March 6, 2020	June 30, 2020	
FW	(Canada) Jordan Perruzza	(Canada) Toronto FC	September 8, 2020	End of season	

== Pre-season ==
The pre-season match vs FC Dallas was announced on December 19, 2019, by SAFC. The match vs Orlando City was announced on January 18, 2020, by OCSC. The remaining schedule was released by SAFC on January 21, 2020.

February 1, 2020	San Antonio FC	5–1	OKC Energy FC	Frisco, Texas
1:00 PM CDT	Di Renzo; Partain (pen.); Gallegos; Trialist; Trialist (pen.)	Report	Gordon	Stadium: Toyota Soccer Center; Attendance: Closed-Door

February 7, 2020	El Paso Locomotive FC	6–2	San Antonio FC	El Paso, Texas
12:00 PM CDT	Salgado; Lomis; Bosetti; Beckie	Report	Di Renzo; Gallegos	Stadium: Westide Sports Complex; Attendance: Closed-Door

February 12, 2020	San Antonio FC	2–3	FC Dallas	San Antonio, Texas
7:30 PM CDT	Yaro (yellow card) 28'; Smith (yellow card) 53'; Maloney 66' (pen.); Gallegos 72'; Bernal (yellow card) 85'; Mercado (yellow card) 90'	Report	Pepi 84'; Barrios 88'; Ziegler 90'	Stadium: Toyota Field; Attendance: 4,372

February 21, 2020	Orlando City SC	2–1	San Antonio FC	Orlando, Florida
6:30 PM CDT	Akindele 28'; Mueller 62'	Report	Montgomery 42'	Stadium: Exploria Stadium; Attendance: Closed-Door

February 28, 2020	San Antonio FC	1–3	Rio Grande Valley FC Toros	San Antonio, Texas
1:00 PM CDT	Partain	Report	Beckford; Trialist; Obregón Jr.	Stadium: STAR Soccer Complex; Attendance: Closed-Door

== Competitions ==
=== Overall ===
Position in Group D in the Western Conference

Competition	Started round	Final position / round	First match	Last match
USL Championship	—	Winners	March 7, 2020	October 4, 2020
USL Championship Playoffs	Conference Quarterfinals	Conference Quarterfinals	October 10, 2020	
U.S. Open Cup	Second Round	Cancelled	April 8, 2020	

Updated to match played October 10, 2020
Source: Competitions

=== Overview ===
Competition	Record							
Competition	G	W	D	L	GF	GA	GD	Win %
USL Championship	16	10	3	3	30	14	+16	62.50
USL Championship Playoffs	1	0	0	1	0	1	−1	0.00
Total	17	10	3	4	30	15	+15	58.82

Updated to match played October 10, 2020
Source: Competitions

=== USL Championship ===
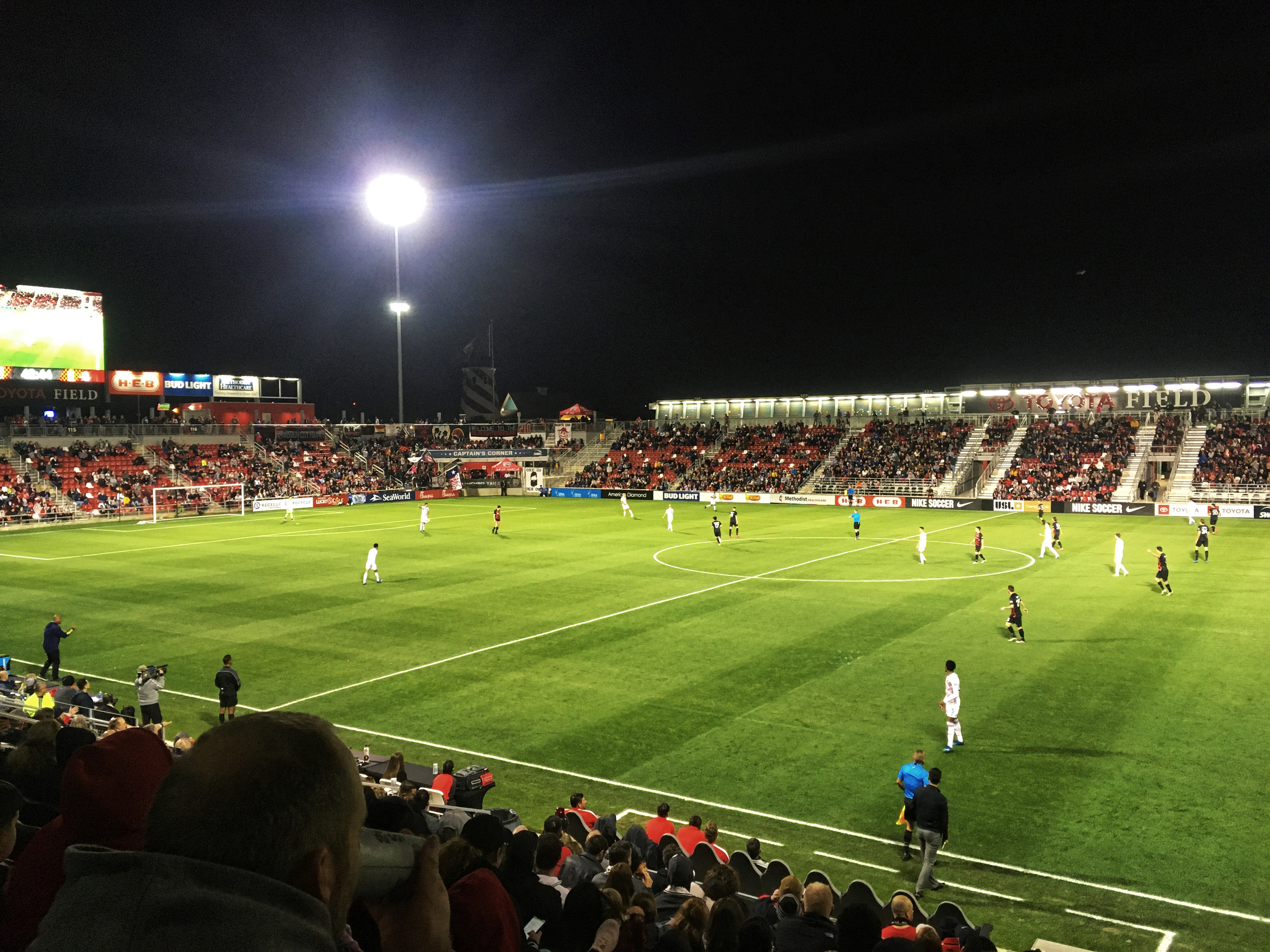
San Antonio FC beat Real Monarchs SLC 1-0 in the 2020 season opener at Toyota Field

The season was suspended on March 12, for 30 days, due to the COVID-19 pandemic. The temporary season suspension was extended through Sunday, May 10 on March 18.

The USL Championship announced on June 24 an updated format for the remainder of the 2020 season. All 35 Championship clubs will be divided into eight groups to complete a 16-game regular season followed by a single-elimination playoff beginning July 11. Five substitutions will be allowed for the remainder of the season. Each team will have three opportunities to make substitutions during regular play. Substitutions may also be made at halftime without counting against a club's three in-game opportunities. San Antonio FC was placed in Group D along with Austin Bold FC, OKC Energy FC, Rio Grande Valley FC, and FC Tulsa.

==== Group table ====
Group D

Pos	Team	Pld	W	D	L	GF	GA	GD	Pts	PPG	Qualification
1	San Antonio FC	16	10	3	3	30	14	+16	33	2.06	Advance to USL Championship Playoffs
2	FC Tulsa	15	6	7	2	21	16	+5	25	1.67	Advance to USL Championship Playoffs
3	Austin Bold FC	16	5	7	4	30	27	+3	22	1.38	
4	Rio Grande Valley FC Toros	14	2	3	9	17	28	−11	9	0.64	
5	OKC Energy FC	16	1	7	8	12	29	−17	10	0.63	

Source: USL

==== Results summary ====
Overall								Home						Away					
Pld	W	D	L	GF	GA	GD	Pts	W	D	L	GF	GA	GD	W	D	L	GF	GA	GD
16	10	3	3	30	14	+16	33	7	1	0	17	5	+12	3	2	3	13	9	+4

Last updated: October 5, 2020.

==== Results by matchday ====
Position in the Group D in the Western Conference. Week 1 position reset to align for Group play.

Round	1	2	3	4	5	6	7	8	9	10	11	12	13	14	15	16
Stadium	H	A	H	A	A	A	H	H	H	A	H	A	H	H	A	A
Result	W	D	W	W	W	D	D	W	W	W	W	L	W	W	L	L
Position	1	2	1	1	1	1	1	1	1	1	1	1	1	1	1	1

Updated to match(es) played on October 5, 2020. Source:
A = Away; H = Home; W = Win; D = Draw; L = Loss

==== Matches ====
The first matches of 2020 were announced on January 6, 2020. The remaining schedule was released on January 9, 2020. Home team is listed first, left to right.

Win Draw Loss Postponed

Kickoff times are in CDT (UTC−05) unless shown otherwise

March 7, 2020 1	San Antonio FC	1–0	Real Monarchs	San Antonio, Texas
7:30 p.m. CST	Di Renzo (yellow card) 33'; Smith (yellow card) 38'; Montgomery 67'	Report	Holt (yellow card) 14'; Mulholland (yellow card) 23'; Powder (yellow card) 56' (yellow-red card) 90+3'; Morgan (yellow card) 66'	Stadium: Toyota Field; Attendance: 7,020; Referee: Chris Ruska

Matches postponed or cancelled due to the COVID-19 pandemic

March 14, 2020 2	Colorado Springs Switchbacks FC	PP	San Antonio FC	Colorado Springs, Colorado
4:30 p.m. CDT				Stadium: Weidner Field
Note: Postponed due to the COVID-19 pandemic

March 21, 2020 3	San Antonio FC	PP	Phoenix Rising FC	San Antonio, Texas
7:30 p.m. CST				Stadium: Toyota Field
Note: Postponed due to the COVID-19 pandemic

March 28, 2020 4	Las Vegas Lights FC	PP	San Antonio FC	Las Vegas, Nevada
9:30 p.m. CDT				Stadium: Cashman Field
Note: Postponed due to the COVID-19 pandemic

April 5, 2020 5	Portland Timbers 2	PP	San Antonio FC	Portland, Oregon
7:00 p.m. CDT				Stadium: Providence Park
Note: Postponed due to the COVID-19 pandemic

April 11, 2020 6	San Antonio FC	PP	Tacoma Defiance	San Antonio, Texas
5:30 p.m. CDT				Stadium: Toyota Field
Note: Match postponed due to COVID-19 pandemic

April 18, 2020 7	Rio Grande Valley FC Toros	PP	San Antonio FC	Edinburg, Texas
7:30 p.m. CDT				Stadium: H-E-B Park
Note: Match postponed in extension to May 10 of original suspension on advice of CDC

April 25, 2020 8	San Antonio FC	PP	Reno 1868 FC	San Antonio, Texas
7:30 p.m. CDT				Stadium: Toyota Field
Note: Match postponed in extension to May 10 of original suspension on advice of CDC

May 3, 2020 9	Austin Bold FC	PP	San Antonio FC	Del Valle, Texas
7:30 p.m. CDT				Stadium: Bold Stadium
Note: Match postponed in extension to May 10 of original suspension on advice of CDC

May 9, 2020 10	San Antonio FC	PP	New Mexico United	San Antonio, Texas
7:30 p.m. CDT				Stadium: Toyota Field
Note: Match postponed in extension to May 10 of original suspension on advice of CDC

May 16, 2020 11	OKC Energy FC	PP	San Antonio FC	Oklahoma City, Oklahoma
7:00 p.m. CST				Stadium: Taft Stadium

May 23, 2020 12	San Antonio FC	PP	San Diego Loyal SC	San Antonio, Texas
7:30 p.m. CST				Stadium: Toyota Field

May 30, 2020 13	San Antonio FC	PP	Austin Bold FC	San Antonio, Texas
7:30 p.m. CST				Stadium: Toyota Field

June 6, 2020 14	San Antonio FC	PP	LA Galaxy II	San Antonio, Texas
7:30 p.m. CST				Stadium: Toyota Field

June 13, 2020 15	El Paso Locomotive FC	PP	San Antonio FC	El Paso, Texas
8:30 p.m. CDT				Stadium: Southwest University Park

June 20, 2020 16	Sacramento Republic FC	PP	San Antonio FC	Sacramento, California
10:00 p.m. CDT				Stadium: Papa Murphy's Park

June 27, 2020 17	San Antonio FC	PP	FC Tulsa	San Antonio, Texas
7:30 p.m. CST				Stadium: Toyota Field

July 3, 2020 18	San Antonio FC	PP	Orange County SC	San Antonio, Texas
7:30 p.m. CST				Stadium: Toyota Field

July 15, 2020 19	Reno 1868 FC	PP	San Antonio FC	Reno, Nevada
9:30 p.m. CST				Stadium: Greater Nevada Field

In the preparations for the resumption of league play following the shutdown prompted by the COVID-19 pandemic, the remainder of SAFC's schedule was announced on July 2.

July 19, 2020 2	Rio Grande Valley FC Toros	1–1	San Antonio FC	Edinburg, Texas
8:00 p.m. CST	Legault (yellow card) 60'; Beckford (yellow card) 78'; Taiberson 90+4'	Report	Parano 3'; PC (yellow card) 73'; Taintor (yellow card) 90'; Di Renzo (yellow card) 90+5'	Stadium: H-E-B Park; Attendance: 0 (Note: Played behind closed doors due to the COVID-19 pandemic in the United States.); Referee: Melvin Rivas

July 25, 2020 3	San Antonio FC	1–0	Rio Grande Valley FC Toros	San Antonio, Texas
8:00 p.m. CST	PC (yellow card) 36'; Di Renzo 60'	Report	Rocha (yellow card) 9'; Rodriguez (yellow card) 45+1'	Stadium: Toyota Field; Attendance: 0 Referee: Elton Garcia

August 1, 2020 4	Austin Bold FC	2–4	San Antonio FC	Del Valle, Texas
8:00 p.m. CST	Forbes 36'; Ciss (yellow card) 42'; Yaro 52' (o.g.); Taylor (yellow card) 72'; Báez (yellow card) 87'; Okugo (yellow card) 90+1'	Report	Solignac 23', 84'; Smith 27'; Montgomery (yellow card) 68'; Parano 74'; PC (yellow card) 90+5'	Stadium: Bold Stadium; Attendance: 0 Referee: Melvin Rivas

August 8, 2020 5	OKC Energy FC	0–3	San Antonio FC	Oklahoma City, Oklahoma
7:00 p.m. CST	Hernández (yellow card) 12'; Hyland (yellow card) 21'; López (yellow card) 42'; Taravel (yellow card) 69'	Report	Di Renzo (yellow card) 29'; Parano 31'; Montgomery 70'; Bailone (yellow card) 73', (goal) 77'	Stadium: Taft Stadium; Attendance: 1,455; Referee: Lorenzo Hernandez

August 12, 2020 6	FC Tulsa	0–0	San Antonio FC	Tulsa, Oklahoma
7:00 p.m. CST	Bird (yellow card) 44'; Garcia (yellow card) 69'; Moloto (yellow card) 72'; Sheldon (yellow card) 85'	Report	Montgomery (yellow card) 37'; Solignac (yellow card) 90+4'	Stadium: ONEOK Field; Attendance: 2,445; Referee: Matthew Corrigan

August 15, 2020 7	San Antonio FC	1–1	Austin Bold FC	San Antonio, Texas
8:00 p.m. CST	PC (yellow card) 42'; Taintor (yellow card) 45+1'; Gallegos 90+2'	Report	Báez 39'; Diouf (yellow card) 76'; McFarlane (yellow card) 77'; Garcia (yellow card) 78'	Stadium: Toyota Field; Attendance: 0 Referee: Elton Garcia

August 19, 2020 8	San Antonio FC	4–0	OKC Energy FC	San Antonio, Texas
8:00 p.m. CST	Solignac 3'; PC 14' (pen.), (yellow card) 25'; Taintor 42', (yellow card) 45+4'; Gorskie (yellow card) 66'; Di Renzo 67'	Report	Brown (yellow card) 28'; Hernández (yellow card) 41'	Stadium: Toyota Field; Attendance: 0 Referee: Héctor Hernández

August 22, 2020 9	San Antonio FC	2–0	FC Tulsa	San Antonio, Texas
8:00 p.m. CST	Solignac (yellow card) 41', (goal) 42'; Bailone 89'	Report	Marlon (yellow card) 59' da Costa (yellow card) 64'; Bourgeois (yellow card) 81'; Bird (yellow card) 82' (yellow-red card) 90+8'; Bastidas (red card) 87'; Martinez (yellow card) 90+7'	Stadium: Toyota Field; Attendance: 0 Referee: Luis Guardia

August 28, 2020 10	Rio Grande Valley FC Toros	1–3	San Antonio FC	Edinburg, Texas
7:00 p.m. CST	Castellanos 35'; McLaughlin (yellow card) 45+6'; Martinez (yellow card) 65'; Hoffmann (yellow card) 80'; Coronado (yellow card) 90+5'	Report	Smith 3'; Solignac 20'; Taintor (yellow card) 30'; PC (yellow card) 41'; Herivaux (yellow card) 53'; Yaro (yellow card) 68'; Di Renzo 90+3'; Bailone (penalty missed) 90+5'	Stadium: H-E-B Park; Attendance: 0 Referee: Malik Badawi

September 5, 2020 11	San Antonio FC	3–2	Rio Grande Valley FC Toros	San Antonio, Texas
8:00 p.m. CST	Solignac 1'; Gorskie 17'; Bailone 22'; Parano (yellow card) 81'	Report	Edwards 10'; Beckford 59'; Murphy (yellow card) 83'	Stadium: Toyota Field; Attendance: 813; Referee: Héctor Hernández

September 12, 2020 12	El Paso Locomotive FC	2–1	San Antonio FC	El Paso, Texas
8:30 p.m. CST	Gómez 40' (pen.); Fox (yellow card) 43'; Salgado (yellow card) 84'; King (yellow card) 90+4'; Taintor 90+4' (o.g.)	Report	Montgomery (yellow card) 39'; Solignac 45' (pen.); Marcina (yellow card) 52'; PC (yellow card) 69'; Perruzza (yellow card) 83'; Taintor (yellow card) 90+3'	Stadium: Southwest University Park; Attendance: 1,519; Referee: Michael Radchuk

September 16, 2020 13	San Antonio FC	3–2	Austin Bold FC	San Antonio, Texas
8:00 p.m. CST	Solignac 1', (yellow card) 61'; Evans (yellow card) 40'; Parano 56'; Gallegos 72'	Report	F. Garcia (yellow card) 37'; Avila 50'; McFarlane 61'; Forbes (yellow card) 68'; Guadarrama (yellow card) 76'	Stadium: Toyota Field; Attendance: 835; Referee: Elton García

September 19, 2020 14	San Antonio FC	2–0	OKC Energy FC	San Antonio, Texas
8:00 p.m. CST	Perruzza 45', 52'; Bailone (yellow card) 89'	Report	Dunwell (yellow card) 63'; Chávez (yellow card) 67'; Stephenson (yellow card) 85'; Taravel (yellow card) 88'	Stadium: Toyota Field; Attendance: 1,122; Referee: Gerald Flores

September 26, 2020 15	FC Tulsa	1–0	San Antonio FC	Tulsa, Oklahoma
7:00 p.m. CST	Moloto (yellow card) 59'; Suárez (yellow card) 61'; Martinez (yellow card) 63'; Bird 90+2'	Report		Stadium: ONEOK Field; Attendance: 3,381; Referee: Ismir Pekmic

October 4, 2020 16	Austin Bold FC	2–1	San Antonio FC	Del Valle, Texas
5:00 p.m. CDT	Forbes 42'; Báez (yellow card) 73'; Twumasi 77'; Taylor (yellow card) 90+1'	Report	Perruzza 30'	Stadium: Bold Stadium; Referee: Elton García

=== USL Championship Playoffs ===
On September 16, 2020, San Antonio clinched a spot in the 2020 USL Championship Playoffs.

October 10, 2020 Conference Quarterfinals	San Antonio FC	0–1	New Mexico United	San Antonio, Texas
8:00 p.m. CDT	Taintor (yellow card) 51'; PC (yellow card) 104'; Bailone (yellow card) 105+1'; Parano (yellow card) 115'	Report	Moreno (yellow card) 48'; Wehan 101', (yellow card) 105+2'; Mizell (yellow card) 103'; Suggs (yellow card) 104'; Tinari (yellow card) 105+3'; Guzmán (yellow card) 107'	Stadium: Toyota Field; Attendance: 2,175; Referee: Elijio Arreguin

=== Lamar Hunt U.S. Open Cup ===
The competition was suspended on March 13, 2020, before the first round fixtures, because of the COVID-19 pandemic. The competition was officially cancelled on August 17, 2020.

April 8, 2020 Second Round	Louisiana Krewe FC or Corpus Christi FC (Texas)	Cancelled	(Texas) San Antonio FC	Lafayette, Louisiana or Corpus Christi, Texas
6:30 p.m. CDT or 7:00 p.m. CDT				Stadium: Ragin' Cajuns Soccer/Track Facility or Dugan Family Soccer and Track Stadium
Note: Match postponed, then cancelled, due to the COVID-19 pandemic

== Statistics ==
=== Appearances ===
Discipline includes league and playoffs play.

No.	Pos.	Name	League		Playoffs		Total		Discipline	
No.	Pos.	Name	Apps	Goals	Apps	Goals	Apps	Goals	Yellow card	Red card
4	DF	(Ghana) Joshua Yaro	12 (1)	0	1	0	13 (1)	0	1	0
6	MF	(Brazil) PC	14	1	1	0	15	1	8	0
7	FW	(Argentina) Gonzalo Di Renzo	8 (8)	3	0 (1)	0	8 (9)	3	3	0
9	FW	(Argentina) Luis Solignac	14 (1)	8	1	0	15 (1)	8	3	0
10	MF	(Argentina) Cristian Parano	11 (3)	4	1	0	12 (3)	4	2	0
14	MF	(Haiti) Zachary Herivaux	6 (2)	0	0	0	6 (2)	0	1	0
17	FW	(United States) Jose Gallegos	12 (4)	2	1	0	13 (4)	2	0	0
18	MF	(United States) Ethan Bryant	0 (2)	0	0	0	0 (2)	0	0	0
20	DF	(United States) Mitchell Taintor	15	1	1	0	16	1	6	0
21	MF	(United States) Leo Torres	0 (2)	0	0	0	0 (2)	0	0	0
22	MF	(Uruguay) Santiago Viera	0 (3)	0	0	0	0 (3)	0	0	0
23	DF	(United States) Blake Smith	16	2	1	0	17	2	1	0
25	FW	(Argentina) Ignacio Bailone	7 (9)	3	0 (1)	0	7 (10)	3	3	0
26	DF	(Isle of Man) Liam Doyle	0	0	1	0	1	0	0	0
27	DF	(United States) Hunter Gorskie	12 (1)	1	0	0	12 (1)	1	1	0
30	DF	(United States) Kai Greene	3 (5)	0	0 (1)	0	3 (6)	0	0	0
31	DF	(United States) Connor Maloney	15	0	1	0	16	0	0	0
32	MF	(United States) Hayden Partain	1 (5)	0	0	0	1 (5)	0	0	0
37	GK	(United States) Matt Cardone	11	0	1	0	12	0	0	0
42	DF	(United States) Jacob Castro	0	0	0	0	0	0	0	0
44	MF	(United States) Rocky Perez	0	0	0	0	0	0	0	0
45	DF	(United States) Sebastian Mercado	0	0	0	0	0	0	0	0
46	FW	(United States) Fabrizio Bernal	0 (1)	0	0	0	0 (1)	0	0	0
47	DF	(United States) Josh Ramsey	0 (1)	0	0	0	0 (1)	0	0	0
77	FW	(Canada) Jordan Perruzza	4 (1)	3	1	0	5 (1)	3	1	0
99	GK	(United States) Carlos Mercado	0	0	0	0	0	0	0	0
Players who left the club
	MF	(United States) Jesús Enríquez	1 (2)	0	0	0	1 (2)	0	0	0
	DF	(Canada) Callum Montgomery	9	2	0	0	9	2	3	0
	FW	(Cameroon) Tabort Etaka Preston	0 (2)	0	0	0	0 (2)	0	0	0
	DF	(Sweden) Axel Sjöberg	1	0	0	0	1	0	0	0
	GK	(Canada) Dayne St. Clair	5	0	0	0	5	0	0	0

Last updated: October 10, 2020.
Source: San Antonio FC

=== Top scorers ===
The list is sorted by shirt number when total goals are equal.

Rnk	Pos	No.	Player	League	Playoffs	Total
1	FW	9	(Argentina) Luis Solignac	8	0	8
2	FW	10	(Argentina) Cristian Parano	4	0	4
3	MF	7	(Argentina) Gonzalo Di Renzo	3	0	3
3	FW	25	(Argentina) Ignacio Bailone	3	0	3
3	FW	77	(Canada) Jordan Perruzza	3	0	3
6	DF	11	(Canada) Callum Montgomery	2	0	2
6	FW	17	(United States) Jose Gallegos	2	0	2
6	DF	23	(United States) Blake Smith	2	0	2
9	MF	6	(Brazil) PC	1	0	1
9	DF	20	(United States) Mitchell Taintor	1	0	1
9	DF	27	(United States) Hunter Gorskie	1	0	1
#	Own goals			0	0	0
TOTALS				30	0	30

Last updated: October 10, 2020.
Source: San Antonio FC

=== Clean sheets ===
The list is sorted by shirt number when total clean sheets are equal.

Rnk	No.	Player	League	Playoffs	Total
1	0	(United States) Matt Cardone	4	0	4
2	97	(Canada) Dayne St. Clair	3	0	3
TOTALS			7	0	7

Last updated: October 10, 2020.
Source: San Antonio FC

=== Summary ===
Games played	17 (16 USL Championship) (1 USL Championship Playoffs)
Games won	10 (10 USL Championship) (0 USL Championship Playoffs)
Games drawn	3 (3 USL Championship) (0 USL Championship Playoffs)
Games lost	4 (3 USL Championship) (1 USL Championship Playoffs)
Goals scored	30 (30 USL Championship) (0 USL Championship Playoffs)
Goals conceded	15 (14 USL Championship) (1 USL Championship Playoffs)
Goal difference	15 (+16 USL Championship) (-1 USL Championship Playoffs)
Clean sheets	7 (7 USL Championship) (0 USL Championship Playoffs)
Yellow cards	33 (29 USL Championship) (4 USL Championship Playoffs)
Red cards	0 (0 USL Championship) (0 USL Championship Playoffs)
Most appearances	(Argentina) Ignacio Bailone (Argentina) Gonzalo Di Renzo (United States) Jose Gallegos (United States) Blake Smith (17 appearances)
Top scorer	(Argentina) Luis Solignac (8 goals)
Winning Percentage	Overall: 10/17 (58.82%)

Last updated: October 10, 2020.
Source: San Antonio FC

== Awards ==
=== Player ===
No.	Player	Award	Week/Month	Source
3	(Canada) Callum Montgomery	Championship Team of the Week	Week 1	
10	(Argentina) Cristian Parano	Championship Team of the Week	Week 5	
9	(Argentina) Luis Solignac	Championship Team of the Week	Week 6	
10	(Argentina) Cristian Parano	Championship Team of the Week	Week 7	
20	(United States) Mitchell Taintor	Championship Team of the Week	Week 9	
23	(United States) Blake Smith	Championship Team of the Week	Week 10	

=== Staff ===
Manager	Award	Source
(Canada) Alen Marcina	USL Championship Coach of the Month (August)	
