= South Texas Derby =

- South Texas Derby logo
- Location: South Texas
- Teams: Rio Grande Valley FC Toros; San Antonio FC
- First meeting: May 7, 2016
- Latest meeting: RGV 0–0 San Antonio; 2023 USLC (August 30, 2023)

Statistics
- Total meetings: 26
- Most wins: San Antonio (11)
- Top scorer: Éver Guzmán (5 goals)
- All-time record: Rio Grande Valley: 6 Drawn: 9 San Antonio: 11
- Largest victory: RGV 3–0 San Antonio; 2016 USL (September 24, 2016)

The South Texas Derby was a regular season series between American soccer clubs Rio Grande Valley FC Toros of Edinburg, Texas and San Antonio FC of San Antonio, Texas. Both teams competed in the Western Conference of the USL Championship, the second tier of soccer in the United States. The teams were located in cities situated in South Texas and were separated by roughly 237 miles (381 km). The series ended when RGV FC ceased all soccer and business operations of December 18, 2023.

== Rivalry ==
The first match in the series was on May 7, 2016, at Toyota Field in San Antonio. RGV's Rob Lovejoy scored the first goal in the rivalry in the 69th minute. San Antonio came back from being down 0–2 but eventually lost to RGV as Lovejoy secured the win with a stoppage-time goal. Needing a win in their final regular-season match to secure a place in the 2016 USL Playoffs, San Antonio FC lost to RGV 0–3 in Edinburg. The loss kept San Antonio out of the playoffs in their inaugural season, while RGV went on to the playoffs, losing in the First Round. RGV FC took the 2016 season series with three wins, one draw, and no losses.

The 2017 USL season saw San Antonio FC earning its first win of the season, and in the Derby, against RGV on March 26, 2017. San Antonio would go on to win two out of the three meetings in the series. In a reversal from their inaugural seasons, San Antonio FC finished in second place in the Western Conference standings; making their first playoff appearance, while Rio Grande Valley FC finished in 11th place, failing to make the playoffs for the first time in their history.

The 2018 USL season was the first time that both teams failed to qualify for the playoffs. San Antonio missed out by just three points and one place in the standings, while RGV ended up in 13th place. In the Derby, 2018 was the first season that RGV failed to win a single match against San Antonio. From the last match in the 2017 season, SAFC went on a four match unbeaten streak against RGV, the team's longest in the rivalry. Beginning with the 2019 season, the rivalry began being scheduled as an equal home-away format. Since the 2019 season, both RGV and San Antonio's derby matches have also been counted in the Copa Tejas competition that pits the four USL Championship clubs from Texas to determine the best in the state.

Due to the coronavirus pandemic and the announcement of the updated competition format for the remainder of the 2020 USL Championship season, the South Texas Derby competition did not play-out as originally scheduled. Both teams were placed in Group D. The revised 2020 schedule was released on July 2 with four scheduled South Texas Derby matches in an equal home-away format.

Both clubs moved to the Mountain Division of the USL Western Conference for the 2021 USL Championship season where RGV opened the series with a 1–0 win that pulled the club even on wins with its rival at 6 apiece. After a pair of 1-1 draws, San Antonio would end the season series with a 2-1 road victory over RGV giving the Alamo City club the lead in wins over their south Texas rival. The South Texas Derby would be played once again in 2021, this time as part of the 2021 USL Championship Playoffs in the Conference Semi-final round held in San Antonio. This was the first post-season Derby between the two sides. San Antonio went on to win 3-1 over RGV which advanced them to the Conference Finals for the first time in club history.

RGV ceased operations on December 18, 2023 effectively ending the derby after 8 seasons.

== Results ==
Home team is listed on the left, away team is listed on the right. Home team's score is listed first.

RGV win San Antonio win Draw

2016 USL season

May 7, 2016 USL	San Antonio FC	2–3	Rio Grande Valley FC Toros	San Antonio, Texas
7:30 p.m. CDT	Sanchez 79'; Chin 84'	SAN Report; RGV Report	Lovejoy 69'; Manotas 72'; Lovejoy 90+'	Stadium: Toyota Field; Attendance: 5,885; Referee: Matthew Kreitzer

May 25, 2016 USL	San Antonio FC	0–0	Rio Grande Valley FC Toros	San Antonio, Texas
7:30 p.m. CDT	Salazar (yellow card) 34'; Cochrane (yellow card) 65'; Bradnock-Brennan (yellow card) 76'	SAN Report; USL Report	Greene (yellow card) 56'; Ward (yellow card) 64'	Stadium: Toyota Field; Attendance: 4,650; Referee: Brandon Artis

June 4, 2016 USL	Rio Grande Valley FC Toros	1–0	San Antonio FC	Edinburg, Texas
7:30 p.m. CDT	Garcia 41', (yellow card) 42'; Escalante (yellow card) 80'	SAN Report	McCarthy (yellow card) 41'; Castillo (yellow card) 44'; Palacios (yellow card) 78'; Araujo (yellow card) 83'	Stadium: UTRGV Soccer and Track Complex; Attendance: 2,431; Referee: Chipalo Street

September 24, 2016 USL	Rio Grande Valley FC Toros	3–0	San Antonio FC	Edinburg, Texas
7:30 p.m. CDT	Murphy (yellow card) 45'; Bird 78'; Luna 83'; Arboleda 90'	RGV Report; SAN Report	Alvarez (yellow card) 20'; Palacios (yellow card) 62'	Stadium: UTRGV Soccer and Track Complex; Attendance: 2,646; Referee: Kyle Phillips

2017 USL season

March 26, 2017 USL	Rio Grande Valley FC Toros	0–1	San Antonio FC	Edinburg, Texas
6:00 p.m. CDT	Garcia (yellow card) 62'	RGV Report; SAN Report; USL Report	Forbes 15'; Rodriguez (yellow card) 90'	Stadium: H-E-B Park; Attendance: 6,030; Referee: Luis Guardia

September 23, 2017 USL	San Antonio FC	0–1	Rio Grande Valley FC Toros	San Antonio, Texas
7:30 p.m. CDT	Newnam (red card) 20'; McCarthy (yellow card) 42'; Pecka (yellow card) 45+6'	SAN Report; RGV Report; USL Report	Escalante 17', (yellow card) 22'; Rodriguez (yellow card) 45+8'; Bird (yellow card) 84'; Holland (yellow card) 89'	Stadium: Toyota Field; Attendance: 8,125; Referee: Michael Radchuck

October 14, 2017 USL	San Antonio FC	3–1	Rio Grande Valley FC Toros	San Antonio, Texas
7:30 p.m. CDT	Forbes 29'; Guzmán 34', 59'	SAN Report; USL Report	Bird 47', (yellow card) 76'; Wharton (yellow card) 54'; Escalante (red card) 73'; Murphy (yellow card) 89'	Stadium: Toyota Field; Attendance: 7,604; Referee: Elton Garcia

2018 USL season

May 12, 2018 USL	Rio Grande Valley FC Toros	0–0	San Antonio FC	Edinburg, Texas
7:30 p.m. CDT	Zaldívar (yellow card) 62'; Wharton (yellow card) 78'	RGV Report; SAN Report; USL Report	Felix (yellow card) 37'; Castillo (yellow card) 59'; Guadarrama (yellow card) 60'; Escalante (yellow card) 82'; King (yellow card) 89'	Stadium: H-E-B Park; Attendance: 7,846; Referee: Farhad Dadkho

August 29, 2018 USL	Rio Grande Valley FC Toros	1–3	San Antonio FC	Edinburg, Texas
7:00 p.m. CDT	Enríquez 3'	RGV Report; SAN Report; USL Report	Presley 49'; Laing 62'; Guzmán 81'; Lopez (yellow card) 90'	Stadium: H-E-B Park; Attendance: 3,958; Referee: Rubiel Vazquez

October 13, 2018 USL	San Antonio FC	1–1	Rio Grande Valley FC Toros	San Antonio, Texas
7:30 p.m. CDT	Guzmán 24', (yellow card) 90+4'; King (yellow card) 68'	SAN Report; RGV Report	Sullivan (yellow card) 12'; Aguilar (yellow card) 20'; Enríquez (yellow card) 43'; Small 51', (yellow card) 58'; Wharton (yellow card) 90+4'	Stadium: Toyota Field; Attendance: 7,018; Referee: Alejandro Mariscal

2019 USL Championship season

May 25, 2019 USLC	Rio Grande Valley FC Toros	3–1	San Antonio FC	Edinburg, Texas
7:30 p.m. CDT	Enríquez 30'; Salazar 36', 58'; Dunwell (yellow card) 74'; Lemoine (yellow card) 90+3'	RGV Report; SAN Report	Guzmán 70'; Yaro (yellow card) 86'	Stadium: H-E-B Park; Attendance: 4,377; Referee: Michael Radchuk

August 17, 2019 USLC	San Antonio FC	2–2	Rio Grande Valley FC Toros	San Antonio, Texas
7:30 p.m. CDT	Barmby 14'; Parano 44'; Greene (yellow card) 68'; López (yellow card) 88'	SAN Report	Fuenmayor (red card) 31'; Martinez (yellow card) 38'; Samuels (yellow card) 45+4'; Castellanos (yellow card) 51'; Small 75'; Ackon 80' (o.g.); Rodriguez (yellow card) 87'; Jackson (yellow card) 90'	Stadium: Toyota Field; Attendance: 7,533; Referee: Sergii Demianchuk

2020 USL Championship season

July 19, 2020 USLC	Rio Grande Valley FC Toros	1–1	San Antonio FC	Edinburg, Texas
8:00 p.m. CDT	Legault (yellow card) 60'; Beckford (yellow card) 78'; Taiberson 90+4'	RGV Report; SAN Report; USL Report	Parano 3'; PC (yellow card) 73'; Taintor (yellow card) 90'; Di Renzo (yellow card) 90+5'	Stadium: H-E-B Park; Attendance: 0 (Note: Played behind closed doors due to the COVID-19 pandemic in the United States.); Referee: Melvin Rivas

July 25, 2020 USLC	San Antonio FC	1–0	Rio Grande Valley FC Toros	San Antonio, Texas
8:00 p.m. CDT	PC (yellow card) 36'; Di Renzo 60'	Report	Rocha (yellow card) 9'; Rodriguez (yellow card) 45+1'	Stadium: Toyota Field; Attendance: 0 Referee: Elton Garcia

August 29, 2020 USLC	Rio Grande Valley FC Toros	1–3	San Antonio FC	Edinburg, Texas
8:00 p.m. CDT	Castellanos 35'; McLaughlin (yellow card) 45+6'; Martinez (yellow card) 65'; Hoffmann (yellow card) 80'; Coronado (yellow card) 90+5'	RGV Report; SAN Report	Smith 3'; Solignac 20'; Taintor (yellow card) 30'; PC (yellow card) 41'; Herivaux (yellow card) 53'; Yaro (yellow card) 68'; Di Renzo 90+3'; Bailone (penalty missed) 90+5'	Stadium: H-E-B Park; Attendance: 0 Referee: Malik Badawi

September 5, 2020 USLC	San Antonio FC	3–2	Rio Grande Valley FC Toros	San Antonio, Texas
8:00 p.m. CDT	Solignac 1'; Gorskie 17'; Bailone 22'; Parano (yellow card) 81'	SAN Report; RGV Report	Edwards 10'; Beckford 59'; Murphy (yellow card) 83'	Stadium: Toyota Field; Attendance: 813 (Note: Capacity limited due to the COVID-19 pandemic in the United States.); Referee: Héctor Hernández

2021 USL Championship season

May 16, 2021 USLC	Rio Grande Valley FC Toros	2–1	San Antonio FC	Edinburg, Texas
7:30 p.m. CDT	Kuzain 42'; Sorto 57'; Robinson (yellow card) 75'; López (yellow card) 90+6'	SAN Report; USL Report	Patiño (yellow card) 31', (goal) 68'; Lema (yellow card) 45'; Cuello (yellow card) 45+3'; Khmiri (yellow card) 78'	Stadium: H-E-B Park; Attendance: 2,610; Referee: Melvin Rivas

May 29, 2021 USLC	San Antonio FC	1–1	Rio Grande Valley FC Toros	San Antonio, Texas
7:30 p.m. CDT	Lema (yellow card) 34'; Epps 40'; Cuello (red card) 80'	SAN Report; USL Report	Pimentel (yellow card) 42'; J. Sánchez (yellow card) 55'; Azócar 89'; V. Sánchez (yellow card) 90'	Stadium: Toyota Field; Attendance: 3,852; Referee: Jon Freemon

June 19, 2021 USLC	San Antonio FC	1–1	Rio Grande Valley FC Toros	San Antonio, Texas
7:30 p.m. CDT	Dhillon 13', (yellow card) 17'; Lindley (yellow card) 15'; Valera (yellow card) 66'; Lema (yellow card) 90'; Doyle (yellow card) 90+5'	SAN Report; USL Report	Sorto 23'; Sánchez (yellow card) 59'; Albuquerque (yellow card) 64'; Sánchez (yellow card) 90+1'; Ramsay (yellow card) 90+5'	Stadium: Toyota Field; Attendance: 3,920; Referee: Elijio Arreguin

August 8, 2021 USLC	Rio Grande Valley FC Toros	1–2	San Antonio FC	Edinburg, Texas
7:30 p.m. CDT	Azócar 35'; Robinson (yellow card) 38'; Njie (yellow card) 77'; Pimentel (yellow card) 79'	SAN Report; USL Report	Fogaça 18' (pen.), 58'; Khmiri (yellow card) 50'; Abu (yellow card) 50'; Cardone (yellow card) 78'	Stadium: H-E-B Park; Attendance: 3,495; Referee: Elvis Osmanovic

November 13, 2021 USLC Playoffs	San Antonio FC	3–1	Rio Grande Valley FC Toros	San Antonio, Texas
8:00 p.m. CDT	Patiño 24', 55'; Nathan 61'; PC (yellow card) 73'; Farr (yellow card) 84'	USL Report	Cabezas (yellow card) 43'; Edwards (yellow card) 45+1'; Azócar (yellow card) 64'; Amoh 69' (pen.)	Stadium: Toyota Field; Attendance: 7,966; Referee: Mark Allatin

2022 USL Championship season

March 27, 2022 USLC	Rio Grande Valley FC Toros	1–2	San Antonio FC	Edinburg, Texas
6:30 p.m. CDT	Ruiz (yellow card) 18'; Borczak 44'; López (yellow card) 49'; Vázquez (yellow card) 89'	USL Report; SAN Report	Diouf (yellow card) 8'; Collier 34', (yellow card) 36'; Loera 45', (yellow card) 90'; Traore (yellow card) 53'; Ayimbila (yellow card) 78'; Garcia (yellow card) 86'	Stadium: H-E-B Park; Attendance: 3,759; Referee: Jeremy Scheer

May 28, 2022 USLC	Rio Grande Valley FC Toros	2–3	San Antonio FC	Edinburg, Texas
7:30 p.m. CDT	Cabezas 41'; Ycaza (yellow card) 56'; López (yellow card) 71'; Hernández (yellow card) 76'; Pimentel (red card) 77'; Ackwei (yellow card) 79'; Malešević (yellow card) 80'; Herrera 90+2'	SAN Report; USL Report	Dhillon 26', (yellow card) 31', (goal) 87'; Traore (yellow card) 31'; Garcia (yellow card) 43'; Khmiri (yellow card) 45+5'; Taintor 62', (yellow card) 79'; Delem (yellow card) 89'	Stadium: H-E-B Park; Attendance: 3,053; Referee: Melvin Rivas

August 20, 2022 USLC	San Antonio FC	2–2	Rio Grande Valley FC Toros	San Antonio, Texas
8:00 p.m. CDT	Khmiri (yellow card) 17'; Abu (yellow card) 18'; Farr (yellow card) 43'; Adeniran (yellow card) 45'; Maloney (yellow card) 53'; Gomez 59'; Bailone (yellow card) 84'; Taintor (yellow card) 90', (goal) 90+6'	SAN Report; RGV Report; USL Report	Pinzon 34'; Ward 36', (yellow card) 90+5'; Ycaza (yellow card) 80'; Coronado (yellow card) 90+9' (yellow-red card) 90+10'	Stadium: Toyota Field; Attendance: 6,511; Referee: Greg Dopka

2023 USL Championship season

August 16, 2023 USLC	San Antonio FC	2–1	Rio Grande Valley FC Toros	San Antonio, Texas
8:00 p.m. CDT	Patiño 13'; Zouhir 30'; Garcia (yellow card) 83'; Hayes (yellow card) 86'	USL Report	Cerro 11'	Stadium: Toyota Field; Attendance: 6,034; Referee: Sergii Boiko

August 30, 2023 USLC	Rio Grande Valley FC Toros	0–0	San Antonio FC	Edinburg, Texas
7:00 p.m. CDT	Ruiz (yellow card) 45'; Ricketts (yellow card) 82'; Cabezas (yellow card) 90'	USL Report	Patiño (yellow card) 24'; Hayes (yellow card) 67'	Stadium: H-E-B Park; Attendance: 2,731; Referee: Elvis Osmanovic

== Top goalscorers ==
As of the latest matchup on August 16, 2023 Does not include own goals. List is sorted by last name when total goals are equal

Position	Name	Team	Goals
1	(Mexico) Éver Guzmán	San Antonio FC	5
2	(Colombia) **Santiago Patiño**	San Antonio FC	4
3	(United States) **Justin Dhillon**	San Antonio FC	3
3	(Brazil) Nathan	San Antonio FC	3
5	(Venezuela) Juan Carlos Azócar	Rio Grande Valley FC	2
5	(United States) Eric Bird	Rio Grande Valley FC	2
5	(Argentina) Gonzalo Di Renzo	San Antonio FC	2
5	(United States) Jesús Enríquez	Rio Grande Valley FC	2
5	(Turks and Caicos Islands) Billy Forbes	San Antonio FC	2
5	(United States) Rob Lovejoy	Rio Grande Valley FC	2
5	(Argentina) Cristian Parano	San Antonio FC	2
5	(Belize) Michael Salazar	Rio Grande Valley FC	2
5	(Panama) Carlos Small	Rio Grande Valley FC	2
5	(Argentina) Luis Solignac	San Antonio FC	2
5	(El Salvador) Christian Sorto	Rio Grande Valley FC	2
5	(United States) **Mitchell Taintor**	San Antonio FC	2
17	25 players		1

Competitive matches only. Players in bold are still active players with the team.

== Players who played for both clubs ==
As of August 30, 2023

Player	Rio Grande Valley FC career			San Antonio FC career		
Player	Span	Apps	Goals	Span	Apps	Goals
(Venezuela) **Juan Carlos Azócar**	2020–2021	27	7	2023-	7	0
(Jamaica) Deshane Beckford	2019–2020	22	3	2022	15	1
(United States) Jesús Enríquez	2018–2019	61	10	2020	3	0
(Honduras) José Escalante	2016–2017	37	7	2018	24	1
(United States) Kai Greene	2016–2018	68	1	2019–2020	44	0
(Cuba) **Frank López**	2021–	55	10	2019	14	8
(United States) **Carter Manley**	2020–2021	46	2	2022–	36	3
(United States) Kyle Murphy	2016–2017	56	10	2018	17	1
(England) Charlie Ward	2016–2017	43	0	2018	12	1

Players in bold are still active players with the team.
