= 2020 USL Championship playoffs =

Tournament details
- Country: United States
- Teams: 16

Final positions
- Champions: Tampa Bay Rowdies (Eastern Conference); Phoenix Rising FC (Western Conference)

Tournament statistics
- Matches played: 14
- Goals scored: 37 (2.64 per match)
- Attendance: 25,836 (1,845 per match)
- Top goal scorer(s): Corey Hertzog (3 goals)

The 2020 USL Championship playoffs was the post-season championship of the 2020 USL Championship. It was the tenth edition of the USL Championship playoffs. The playoffs began on October 10, and originally scheduled to conclude with the USL Championship Final on November 1. The Final was then cancelled the day before because several Tampa Bay Rowdies players and staff tested positive for COVID-19. The championship would not be awarded.

Real Monarchs were the defending USL Championship champions, but failed to qualify for the playoffs.

== Qualified teams ==
Group A

- Reno 1868 FC
- Sacramento Republic FC

Group B

- Phoenix Rising FC
- LA Galaxy II

Group C

- El Paso Locomotive FC
- New Mexico United

Group D

- San Antonio FC
- FC Tulsa

Group E

- Louisville City FC
- Saint Louis FC

Group F

- Pittsburgh Riverhounds SC
- Hartford Athletic

Group G

- Charlotte Independence
- Birmingham Legion FC

Group H

- Tampa Bay Rowdies
- Charleston Battery

=== Format ===
The top two teams in each group will qualify for the 2020 Championship playoffs. They will begin on October 10, featuring a single-elimination, 16-team bracket. Under the revised season format, four group winners in each conference will earn hosting rights for the Eastern and Western Conference quarterfinals. Following the opening round, hosting rights will be determined by regular season record. All playoff matches will stream live on ESPN+ except the Championship final on ESPN.

== Conference tables ==
=== Western Conference ===
Pos	Team	Pld	W	L	T	GF	GA	GD	Pts	PPG	Qualification
1	Reno 1868 FC	16	11	2	3	43	21	+22	36	2.25	Conference Quarterfinals
2	Phoenix Rising FC	16	11	3	2	46	17	+29	35	2.19	Conference Quarterfinals
3	San Antonio FC	16	10	3	3	30	14	+16	33	2.06	Conference Quarterfinals
4	El Paso Locomotive FC	16	9	2	5	24	14	+10	32	2.00	Conference Quarterfinals
5	Sacramento Republic	16	8	2	6	27	17	+10	30	1.88	Conference Quarterfinals
6	New Mexico United	15	8	4	3	23	17	+6	27	1.80	Conference Quarterfinals
7	FC Tulsa	15	6	2	7	21	16	+5	25	1.67	Conference Quarterfinals
8	LA Galaxy II	16	8	6	2	29	32	−3	26	1.63	Conference Quarterfinals
9	Orange County SC	16	7	6	3	18	18	0	24	1.50	
10	San Diego Loyal SC	16	6	5	5	17	18	−1	23	1.44	
11	Austin Bold FC	16	5	4	7	30	26	+4	22	1.38	
12	Tacoma Defiance	16	4	10	2	25	32	−7	14	0.88	
13	Colorado Springs Switchbacks	16	2	7	7	19	28	−9	13	0.81	
14	Real Monarchs	16	3	11	2	14	25	−11	11	0.69	
15	Las Vegas Lights FC	16	2	9	5	24	34	−10	11	0.69	
16	Rio Grande Valley Toros	14	2	9	3	17	28	−11	9	0.64	
17	OKC Energy FC	16	1	8	7	12	29	−17	10	0.63	
18	Portland Timbers 2	16	3	13	0	20	50	−30	9	0.56	

Source: USL Championship
Rules for classification: 1) points per game; 2) points; 3) total wins; 4) total goal differential; 5) total goals scored; 6) disciplinary points; 7) coin toss or drawing of lots.

=== Eastern Conference ===
Pos	Team	Pld	W	L	T	GF	GA	GD	Pts	PPG	Qualification
1	Louisville City FC	16	11	3	2	28	12	+16	35	2.19	Conference Quarterfinals
2	Hartford Athletic	16	11	3	2	31	24	+7	35	2.19	Conference Quarterfinals
3	Pittsburgh Riverhounds SC	16	11	4	1	39	10	+29	34	2.13	Conference Quarterfinals
4	Tampa Bay Rowdies	16	10	3	3	25	11	+14	33	2.06	Conference Quarterfinals
5	Charleston Battery	15	9	3	3	26	15	+11	30	2.00	Conference Quarterfinals
6	Charlotte Independence	16	8	4	4	24	22	+2	28	1.75	Conference Quarterfinals
7	Birmingham Legion FC	16	7	5	4	29	19	+10	25	1.56	Conference Quarterfinals
8	Saint Louis FC	16	7	5	4	22	21	+1	25	1.56	Conference Quarterfinals
9	Indy Eleven	16	7	7	2	21	19	+2	23	1.44	
10	North Carolina FC	15	6	8	1	17	21	−4	19	1.27	
11	Memphis 901 FC	15	4	7	4	24	31	−7	16	1.07	
12	Sporting Kansas City II	16	5	10	1	21	30	−9	16	1.00	
13	Miami FC	16	4	8	4	20	34	−14	16	1.00	
14	New York Red Bulls II	16	5	11	0	30	37	−7	15	0.94	
15	Atlanta United 2	16	3	10	3	23	33	−10	12	0.75	
16	Philadelphia Union II	16	2	11	3	20	45	−25	9	0.56	
17	Loudoun United FC	13	1	9	3	10	28	−18	6	0.46	

Source: USL Championship
Rules for classification: 1) points per game; 2) points; 3) total wins; 4) total goal differential; 5) total goals scored; 6) disciplinary points; 7) coin toss or drawing of lots.

== Bracket ==
Conference Quarterfinals; October 10	Conference Semifinals; October 17
A1	Reno 1868 FC	4
B2	LA Galaxy II	1
A1	Reno 1868 FC	2 (4)
B1	Phoenix Rising FC (p)	2 (5)
B1	Phoenix Rising FC (a.e.t.)	1
A2	Sacramento Republic FC	0
Western Conference
C1	El Paso Locomotive FC (p)	2 (4)
D2	FC Tulsa	2 (2)
C1	El Paso Locomotive FC (p)	1 (5)
C2	New Mexico United	1 (3)
D1	San Antonio FC	0
C2	New Mexico United (a.e.t.)	1
E1	Louisville City FC	2
F2	Pittsburgh Riverhounds	0
E1	Louisville City FC	2
E2	Saint Louis FC	0
F1	Hartford Athletic	0
E2	Saint Louis FC	1
Eastern Conference
G1	Charlotte Independence	1
H2	Charleston Battery (a.e.t.)	2
H2	Charleston Battery	0
H1	Tampa Bay Rowdies	1
H1	Tampa Bay Rowdies	4
G2	Birmingham Legion FC	2

Conference Finals; October 24
B1	Phoenix Rising FC (p)	1 (4)
C1	El Paso Locomotive FC	1 (2)
E1	Louisville City FC	1
H1	Tampa Bay Rowdies	2

USL Championship; Cancelled
B1	Phoenix Rising FC	Ø
H1	Tampa Bay Rowdies	Ø

== Schedule ==
=== Conference Quarterfinals ===
October 10, 2020 East	Hartford Athletic	0–1	Saint Louis FC	Hartford, Connecticut
7:00 PM EDT	Silva (yellow card) 16'; Strong (yellow card) 45+1'; Barrera (yellow card) 61'; Politz (yellow card) 90+3'	Report	Greig (yellow card) 73'; Fall (yellow card) 89'; Rivas 90+3'	Stadium: Dillon Stadium; Attendance: 2,194; Referee: Kevin Broadley

October 10, 2020 East	Tampa Bay Rowdies	4–2	Birmingham Legion FC	St. Petersburg, Florida
7:30 PM EDT	Doherty 8'; Guenzatti 38'; Mkosana 78'; Fernandes 80'	Report	Crognale (yellow card) 10'; Lopez (yellow card) 20'; Williams (yellow card) 42'; Kasim 57'; Lapa 63'; Cromwell (yellow card) 85'	Stadium: Al Lang Stadium; Attendance: 1,098; Referee: Eric Tattersall

October 10, 2020 East	Louisville City FC	2–0	Pittsburgh Riverhounds SC	Louisville, Kentucky
7:30 PM EDT	Lancaster 17'; Souahy (yellow card) 26'; Hoppenot (yellow card) 29'; Jimenez (yellow card) 53'; Bone 86'	Report	Thomas (yellow card) 45'	Stadium: Lynn Family Stadium; Attendance: 4,900; Referee: Elton García

October 10, 2020 East	Charlotte Independence	1–2 (a.e.t.)	Charleston Battery	Matthews, North Carolina
8:00 PM EDT	Roberts 64'; Martínez (yellow card) 90+4'; Dimick (yellow card) 100'; Sabella (yellow card) 118'	Report	Daley 3'; Crawford (yellow card) 63'; Paterson (yellow card) 71'; Marini (yellow card) 99'; Bosua 101' (yellow card) 109'	Stadium: Sportsplex at Matthews; Attendance: 100; Referee: Lukasz Szpala

October 10, 2020 West	Reno 1868 FC	4–1	LA Galaxy II	Reno, Nevada
7:00 PM MDT	Partida 4' (yellow card) 45'; Hertzog 35', 59' (pen.) (yellow card) 77'; Langsdorf 53'; Beaury (yellow card) 85'	Report	Neal 10'; Romero (yellow card) 58'; Hernández (yellow card) 66'; Vázquez (yellow card) 74'; Saldana (red card) 76'	Stadium: Greater Nevada Field; Attendance: 250; Referee: Matthew Thompson

October 10, 2020 West	San Antonio FC	0–1 (a.e.t.)	New Mexico United	San Antonio, Texas
7:00 PM CDT	Taintor (yellow card) 51'; Giro (yellow card) 104'; Bailone (yellow card) 105+1'; Parano (yellow card) 115'	Report	Moreno (yellow card) 48'; Mizell (yellow card) 94'; Wehan 101' (yellow card) 105+2'; Suggs (yellow card) 104'; Tinari (yellow card) 105+3'; Guzmán (yellow card) 107'	Stadium: Toyota Field; Attendance: 2,175; Referee: Elijio Arreguin

October 10, 2020 West	El Paso Locomotive FC	2–2 (a.e.t.) (4–2 p)	FC Tulsa	El Paso, Texas
7:30 PM MDT	Carrijó 19', 82'; Borelli (yellow card) 67'; Rebellón (yellow card) 96'	Report	Bird (yellow card) 24'; Da Costa 38'; Chapman-Page (yellow card) 61' (yellow-red card) 101' (goal) 68'	Stadium: Southwest University Park; Attendance: 1,659; Referee: Brandon Stevis
	Penalties
	Ross (penalty scored); Rebellón (penalty scored); Ryan (penalty scored); Robinson (penalty scored)		(penalty scored) Altamirano; (penalty missed) Moloto; (penalty missed) Martínez; (penalty scored) Bourgeois

October 10, 2020 West	Phoenix Rising FC	1–0 (a.e.t.)	Sacramento Republic FC	Scottsdale, Arizona
7:30 PM MST	Dadashov (yellow card) 44'; Lambert (yellow card) 109'; Asante 114'	Report	Formella (yellow card) 12'; López (yellow card) 45'; Hilliard-Arce (yellow card) 74'; McCrary (yellow card) 87'; Keinan (yellow card) 90+1'	Stadium: Casino Arizona Field; Referee: Elvis Osmanovic

=== Conference Semifinals ===
October 17, 2020 East	Louisville City FC	2–0	Saint Louis FC	Louisville, Kentucky
7:30 PM EDT	Totsch (yellow card) 11'; Lancaster 18'; Williams (yellow card) 20'; Lundt (yellow card) 75'; Adewole 83' (o.g.)	Report	Gee (yellow card) 25'; Fink (yellow card) 82'; Samb (yellow card) 90+3'	Stadium: Lynn Family Stadium; Attendance: 4,900; Referee: Lukasz Szpala

October 17, 2020 East	Tampa Bay Rowdies	1–0	Charleston Battery	St. Petersburg, Florida
7:30 PM EDT	Scarlett (yellow card) 38'; Mkosana 79'	Report	Archer (yellow card) 57'	Stadium: Al Lang Stadium; Attendance: 1,301; Referee: Ismir Pekmic

October 17, 2020 West	Reno 1868 FC	2–2 (a.e.t.) (4–5 p)	Phoenix Rising FC	Reno, Nevada
6:00 PM PDT	Hertzog 6'; Janjigian (yellow card) 31'; Partida 40'; Bone (yellow card) 57'; Langsdorf (yellow card) 79'; Ycaza (yellow card) 90+4'; Boudadi (yellow card) 119'	Report	King (yellow card) 23'; Lambert 45+2' (yellow card) 51'; Lowe (yellow card) 65'; Asante 71'; Moar (yellow card) 94'	Stadium: Greater Nevada Field; Attendance: 700; Referee: Kevin Broadley
	Penalties
	Hertzog (penalty scored); Alfaro (penalty scored); Richards (penalty scored); Gleadle (penalty scored); Apodaca (penalty missed)		(penalty scored) Farrell; (penalty scored) Whelan; (penalty scored) Calistri; (penalty scored) King; (penalty scored) Dadashov

October 17, 2020 West	El Paso Locomotive FC	1–1 (a.e.t.) (5–3 p)	New Mexico United	El Paso, Texas
7:30 PM MDT	Mares 30'; Borelli (yellow card) 50'; Gómez (yellow card) 52'; Moreno (yellow card) 53'; Diaz (yellow card) 112'	Report	Hamilton (yellow card) 38'; Parkes 90+5'	Stadium: Southwest University Park; Attendance: 1,659; Referee: Jon Freemon
	Penalties
	Borelli (penalty scored); Ross (penalty scored); Ryan (penalty scored); Robinson (penalty scored); Zola (penalty scored)		(penalty scored) Sandoval; (penalty scored) Wehan; (penalty scored) Ryden; (penalty missed) Parkes

=== Conference Finals ===
October 24, 2020 East	Louisville City FC	1–2	Tampa Bay Rowdies	Louisville, Kentucky
7:30 PM EDT	McMahon (yellow card) 27'; Lachowecki 45' (o.g.)	Report	Steinberger 3'; Lasso (yellow card) 29'; Dalgaard (yellow card) 38'; Guenzatti 45+3'; Guillén (yellow card) 83'; Ekra (yellow card) 90+1'	Stadium: Lynn Family Stadium; Attendance: 4,900; Referee: Jon Freemon

October 24, 2020 West	Phoenix Rising FC	1–1 (a.e.t.) (4–2 p)	El Paso Locomotive FC	Scottsdale, Arizona
7:30 PM MST	Schweitzer 18'; Farrell (yellow card) 95'; Asante (yellow card) 109'; Lowe (yellow card) 113'	Report	Monsalvez (yellow card) 4'; King (yellow card) 54'; Rebellón 59' (yellow card) 94'; Herrera (yellow card) 105+2'; Diaz (yellow card) 106'; Ryan (yellow card) 108'; Carrijó (yellow card) 111'	Stadium: Casino Arizona Field; Referee: Elton García
	Penalties
	Bakero (penalty scored); Whelan (penalty scored); Farrell (penalty scored); Moar (penalty scored)		(penalty scored) Carrijó; (penalty missed) Ross; (penalty scored) Ryan; (penalty missed) Gómez

=== USL Championship Final ===
The Final was cancelled the day before because several Tampa Bay Rowdies players and staff tested positive for COVID-19. The championship would not be awarded.

November 1, 2020	Tampa Bay Rowdies	Cancelled	Phoenix Rising FC	St. Petersburg, Florida
8:30 PM EST				Stadium: Al Lang Stadium
Note: Phoenix relinquished the right to host the final as a gesture of respect to the LGBTQ community for the incident between Phoenix Rising and San Diego Loyal on September 30.

== Top goalscorers ==
As of October 31, 2020

Rank	Player	Club	Goals
1	(United States) Corey Hertzog	Reno 1868 FC	3
2	(Ghana) Solomon Asante	Phoenix Rising FC	2
2	(Brazil) Leandro Carrijó	El Paso Locomotive FC	2
2	(Uruguay) Sebastián Guenzatti	Tampa Bay Rowdies	2
2	(England) Cameron Lancaster	Louisville City FC	2
2	(Zimbabwe) Lucky Mkosana	Tampa Bay Rowdies	2
2	(United States) Kevin Partida	Reno 1868 FC	2

== Awards ==
- Goal of the Playoffs: (Republic of Ireland) Jordan Doherty (TBR)
- Save of the Playoffs: (United States) Cody Mizell (NMU)
