= Jonathan Jiménez =

Jonathan Jiménez may refer to:

- Jonathan Jiménez (footballer, born 1992), Salvadoran footballer
- Jonathan Jimenez (soccer, born 1997), Trinidadian footballer
- Jonathan Jiménez (footballer, born 2001), Mexican footballer
