= Gonzalo Di Renzo =

Argentine footballer

Personal information
- Full name: Gonzalo Ignacio Di Renzo
- Date of birth: 30 December 1995 (age 30)
- Place of birth: Bahía Blanca, Argentina
- Height: 1.87 m (6 ft 1 1/2 in)
- Position: Right winger

Team information
- Current team: Sabah F.C.
- Number: 7

Youth career
- Liniers
- 2011–2015: Lanús

Senior career*
Years	Team	Apps	(Gls)
2015–2020	Lanús	29	(0)
2016–2017	→ Sarmiento (loan)	19	(0)
2017	→ Patronato (loan)	8	(0)
2019	→ Deportivo Lara (loan)	19	(1)
2020	→ San Antonio FC (loan)	17	(3)
2021	Estudiantes BA	17	(0)
2022–2024	Lanzarote	59	(36)
2024–2025	Ourense	45	(9)
2025–2026	Talavera de la Reina	32	(10)
2026	Sabah F.C.	6	(4)
- * Club domestic league appearances and goals as of 21 November 2026

Gonzalo Ignacio Di Renzo (born 30 December 1995) is an Argentine professional footballer who plays as a Right winger for Malaysia Super League club Sabah F.C..

== Career ==
Di Renzo began in the youth system of Liniers, before joining Lanús in 2011. He was promoted into their first-team for the 2015 Argentine Primera División season, making his debut on 15 February during a win away to Quilmes. He made twenty-one appearances in all competitions in his debut season, as well as scoring twice including his career first in the Copa Sudamericana in September versus Belgrano. However, Di Renzo didn't make an appearance in the 2016 or 2016–17 campaigns. On 11 August 2016, Di Renzo was loaned to Sarmiento. Nineteen appearances followed with relegation to Primera B Nacional.

In July 2017, Di Renzo joined fellow Primera División side Patronato on loan. He made his debut versus San Martín (SJ) on 27 August, which was the first of eight matches for Patronato before he returned to Lanús in December 2017. January 2019 saw Di Renzo switch Argentina for Venezuela by signing a loan contract with Deportivo Lara. He scored his first regular season career goal on 24 February versus Deportivo Anzoátegui. On 23 January 2020, Di Renzo headed to the United States on loan with USL Championship team San Antonio FC. He made his debut on 7 March against Real Monarchs.

Di Renzo's first goal for San Antonio came in a South Texas Derby win over Rio Grande Valley FC Toros on 25 July 2020; his 60th-minute goal was assisted by fellow Argentine Cristian Parano. He scored again against RGVFC on 28 August, which was preceded by a goal versus Oklahoma City Energy a week prior. In March 2021, Di Renzo joined Estudiantes of Primera Nacional on a free transfer. He debuted in a 1–1 home draw with San Martín (T) on 20 March.

In January 2022, Di Renzo joined Spanish Tercera División RFEF club UD Lanzarote.

In February 2023, Di Renzo officially left Lanzarote after terminating his contract.

== Career statistics ==
As of 21 November 2026.

Club statistics
Club	Season	League			Cup		League Cup		Continental		Other		Total	
Club	Season	Division	Apps	Goals	Apps	Goals	Apps	Goals	Apps	Goals	Apps	Goals	Apps	Goals
Lanús	2015	Argentine Primera División	15	0	1	0	—		3 (Note: Appearance(s) in the Copa Sudamericana)	1	2 (Note: Appearance(s) in the Argentine Primera División play-offs)	1	21	2
Lanús	2016	Argentine Primera División	0	0	0	0	—		—		0	0	0	0
Lanús	2016–17	Argentine Primera División	0	0	0	0	—		0	0	0	0	0	0
Lanús	2017–18	Argentine Primera División	11	0	0	0	—		2	1	0	0	13	1
Lanús	2018–19	Argentine Primera División	3	0	0	0	—		2	0	0	0	5	0
Lanús	2019–20	Argentine Primera División	0	0	0	0	—		0	0	0	0	0	0
Lanús	2020–21	Argentine Primera División	0	0	0	0	—		0	0	0	0	0	0
Lanús	Total		29	0	1	0	—		7	2	2	1	39	3
Sarmiento (loan)	2016–17	Argentine Primera División	19	0	0	0	—		—		0	0	19	0
Patronato (loan)	2017–18	Argentine Primera División	8	0	0	0	—		—		0	0	8	0
Deportivo Lara (loan)	2019	Venezuelan Primera División	19	1	0	0	—		8 (Note: Appearance(s) in the Copa Libertadores and Copa Sudamericana)	0	1 (Note: Appearance(s) in the Venezuelan Primera División play-offs)	0	28	1
San Antonio FC (loan)	2020	USL Championship	17	3	0	0	—		—		0	0	17	3
Estudiantes	2021	Primera Nacional	1	0	0	0	—		—		0	0	1	0
Lanzarote	2022–2023	Tercera Federación	1	1	0	0	—		—		0	0	1	1
Lanzarote	2023–2024	Tercera Federación	8	12	0	0	—		—		0	0	8	12
Ourense CF	2023–2024	Segunda Federación	6	8	0	0	—		—		0	0	6	8
Ourense CF	2024–2025	Primera Federación	34	1	0	0	—		—		0	0	34	1
Talavera de la Reina	2025–2026	Primera Federación	32	10	0	0	—		—		0	0	32	10
Sabah F.C.	2026–2027	Malaysia Super League	6	4	0	0	—		—		0	0	6	4
Career total			180	40	1	0	—		15	2	3	1	199	43
