= Kyle Adams (footballer) =

New Zealand footballer (born 1996)

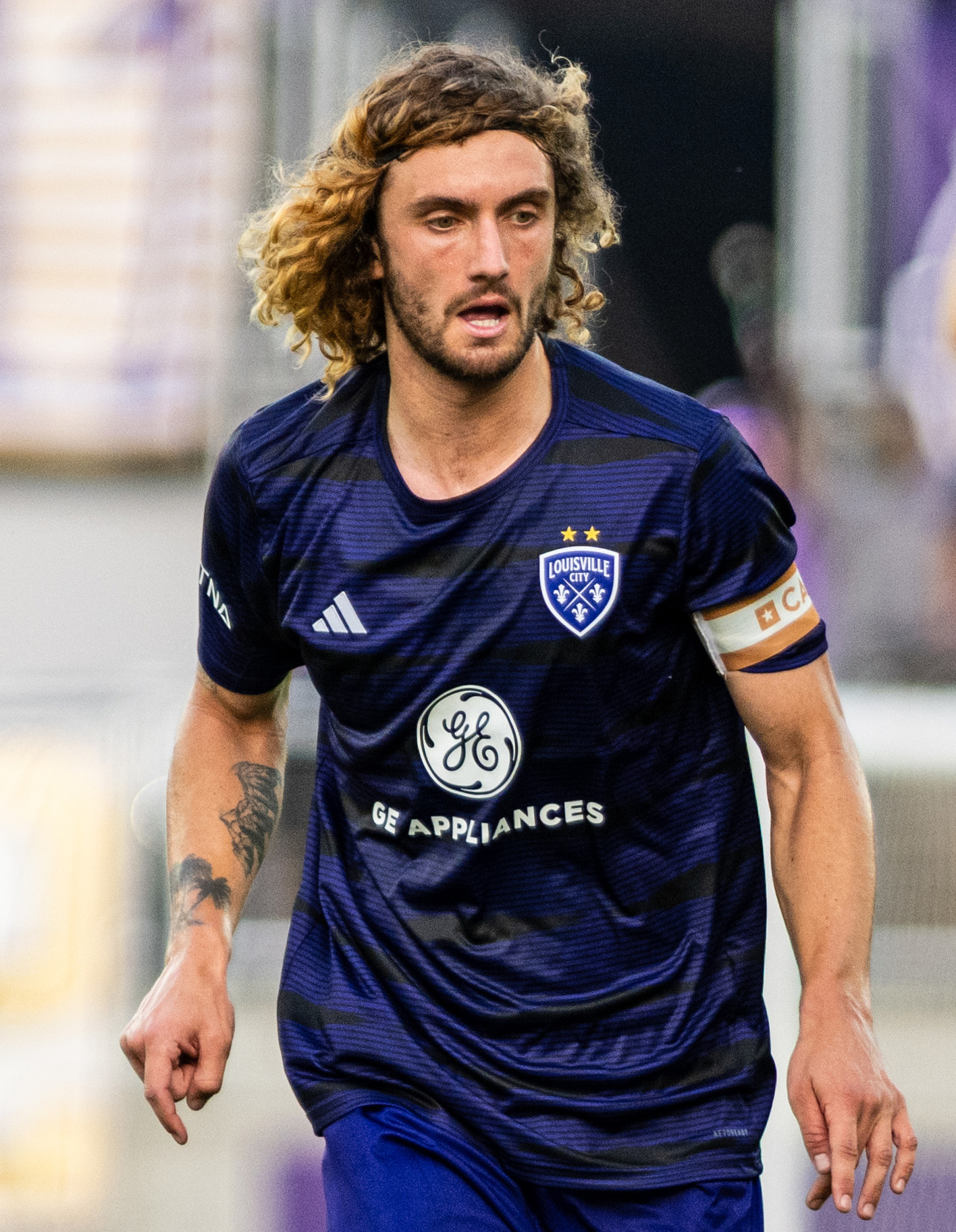
- Adams with Louisville City FC in 2024

Personal information
- Date of birth: 20 November 1996 (age 29)
- Place of birth: Auckland, New Zealand
- Height: 1.88 m (6 ft 2 in)
- Position: Defender

Team information
- Current team: Louisville City
- Number: 32

Youth career
- Western Suburbs

College career
Years	Team	Apps	(Gls)
2015–2017	San Diego State Aztecs	56	(2)

Senior career*
Years	Team	Apps	(Gls)
2016	FC Tucson	11	(0)
2017	SoCal Surf	2	(0)
2018–2019	Rio Grande Valley FC	52	(1)
2020	Houston Dynamo	0	(0)
2020	→ Rio Grande Valley FC (loan)	9	(0)
2021	Real Monarchs	29	(1)
2022–2023	San Diego Loyal	51	(2)
2023–	Louisville City	97	(3)

International career^{‡}
- New Zealand U-17
- New Zealand U-20
2023–	New Zealand	1	(0)
- * Club domestic league appearances and goals as of 31 October 2026 ‡ National team caps and goals as of 26 September 2023

Kyle Adams (born 20 November 1996) is a New Zealand soccer player who currently plays for Louisville City.

== Career ==
=== Youth and college ===
Adams played three years of college soccer at San Diego State University between 2015 and 2017.

While at college, Adams played with USL PDL sides FC Tucson and SoCal Surf.

=== Professional ===
==== Rio Grande Valley FC ====
Adams joined United Soccer League side Rio Grande Valley FC Toros on 18 January 2018. He made his professional debut on 16 March 2018 in a 1–1 draw with Saint Louis FC. He made 25 appearances with the Toros during his first season. On 20 July 2019, Adams scored his first goal for the Toros in the 90th minute to give RGVFC a 2–1 win over Sacramento Republic. Adams served as the captain for RGVFC during the 2019 season. Throughout the season Adams was promoted to the Toro's MLS affiliate Houston Dynamo on short-term loans, but he did not appear in any games.

==== Houston Dynamo ====
On 25 January 2020, Adams signed with the Houston Dynamo. He was loaned back to RGVFC in 2020, where he made 9 appearances in a shortened season due to the COVID-19 pandemic. His contract option was declined by Houston following their 2020 season.

==== Real Monarchs ====
On 8 January 2021, Adams joined USL Championship side Real Monarchs.

==== San Diego Loyal ====
On 5 January 2022, Adams moved again within the USL Championship, joining San Diego Loyal.

==== Louisville City ====
On 27 July 2023, Adams was transferred to Louisville City in the USL Championship for an undisclosed fee.

Following the 2025 season in with Louisville City won their second consecutive Players’ Shield, Adams was named USL Championship Defender of the Year.

== Personal life ==
Adams is engaged to Racing Louisville FC midfielder Savannah DeMelo.

== Career statistics ==
As of March 1, 2024

Club	Season	League			Playoffs		Cup		Continental		Total	
Club	Season	Division	Apps	Goals	Apps	Goals	Apps	Goals	Apps	Goals	Apps	Goals
FC Tucson	2016	PDL	11	0	2	1	1	0	—		14	1
SoCal Surf	2017	PDL	2	0	—		—		—		2	0
Rio Grande Valley FC	2018	USL	25	0	—		—		—		25	0
Rio Grande Valley FC	2019	USLC	27	1	—		—		—		27	1
Rio Grande Valley FC	RGVFC Total		52	1	0	0	0	0	0	0	52	1
Houston Dynamo	2020	MLS	0	0	—		0	0	—		0	0
Rio Grande Valley FC	2020	USLC	9	0	—		—		—		9	0
Real Monarchs	2021	USLC	29	1	—		—		—		29	1
San Diego Loyal	2022	USLC	32	2	1	0	2	0	—		35	2
San Diego Loyal	2023	USLC	18	0	—		2	1	—		20	1
San Diego Loyal	SDL Total		50	2	1	0	4	1	—		55	3
Career total			153	4	3	1	5	2	0	0	161	6
