= Connor Maloney =

American soccer player

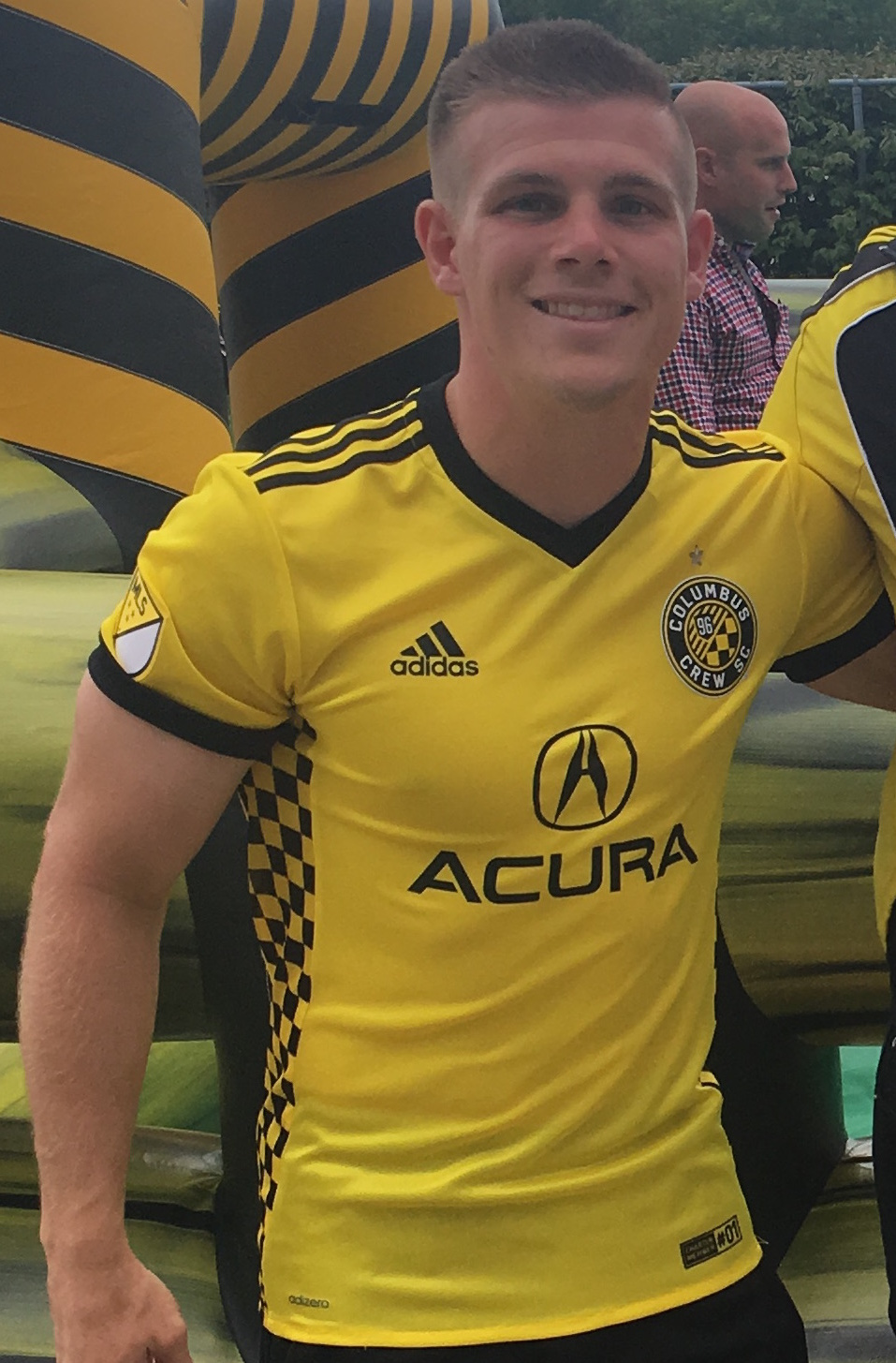
- Maloney with Columbus in 2017

Personal information
- Full name: Connor Austin Maloney
- Date of birth: May 18, 1995 (age 31)
- Place of birth: Harrisburg, Pennsylvania, United States
- Height: 5 ft 6 in (1.68 m)
- Position: Full-back

Youth career
- –2012: Pennsylvania Classics
- 2011–2012: Philadelphia Union

College career
Years	Team	Apps	(Gls)
2013–2016	Penn State Nittany Lions	75	(27)

Senior career*
Years	Team	Apps	(Gls)
2014	Reading United	1	(0)
2017–2019	Columbus Crew	13	(0)
2017	→ Pittsburgh Riverhounds (loan)	2	(0)
2018	→ Pittsburgh Riverhounds (loan)	2	(0)
2020–2023	San Antonio FC	96	(0)
- * Club domestic league appearances and goals as of October 24, 2023

Connor Austin Maloney (born May 18, 1995) is an American former soccer player who played as a full-back. His senior career includes stints with four different American clubs and experience in Major League Soccer. Playing collegiately at Penn State, Maloney was the 2014 Big Ten Offensive Player of the Year.

A native of Harrisburg, Pennsylvania, Maloney graduated from Bishop McDevitt High School, where he was a two-sport athlete and set multiple school and state records. He played collegiately at Pennsylvania State University, where he was a two-time captain for the Nittany Lions and a three-time All-Big Ten First Team honoree. Maloney was drafted in the 2017 MLS SuperDraft by Columbus Crew. He played his first three professional seasons as a backup in Columbus, spending time on loan during two of those years with Pittsburgh Riverhounds. Maloney signed for USL Championship club San Antonio FC in 2020.

== Early life ==
Born in Harrisburg, Pennsylvania, Maloney attended Bishop McDevitt High School, where he played soccer and American football. He was a three-year captain of the varsity soccer team, twice earning all-PIAA honors. As a senior, Maloney was named as an NSCAA High School All-American after scoring 45 goals, including nine hat tricks. He scored 110 goals with the Crusaders, a school and conference record, and set a school record with 68 assists. He was also the Bishop McDevitt placekicker for four years, debatably setting a state record by scoring 328 points. (Note: Some sources attribute the record to Connor Raupach, who scored 320 points during his career at Berlin Brothersvalley High School.)

At club level, Maloney played for Pennsylvania Classics in the U.S. Soccer Development Academy. While in high school, he spent two summers with the Philadelphia Union Academy, winning the Generation Adidas Cup in 2012. He was ranked as the no. 21 recruit in the country, and the third-best player in Pennsylvania, by TopDrawerSoccer.com and committed to play collegiately for the Penn State Nittany Lions and coach Bob Warming.

== College and amateur ==
Maloney was officially announced as a member of the Nittany Lions on April 5, 2013, one of ten recruits that Penn State brought in ahead of the season. He went on to start every game he played across his four years in University Park. Maloney scored his first collegiate goal in a 2–1 loss to Akron on November 6 and scored his first postseason goal in a 1–0 victory over UC Santa Barbara in the 2013 NCAA Tournament. He finished the season with two goals and a team-high seven assists from 21 appearances, good enough to earn a spot on the All-Big Ten Freshman team as a unanimous selection. Maloney put up his best statistical season as a sophomore: a career-high ten goals, as well as three assists, from 20 appearances. Five of his goals were match-winners, including in each of the first two games on the year. He was named as the 2014 Big Ten Offensive Player of the Year and was a unanimous selection to the All-Big Ten First Team.

Prior to his junior season, Maloney was called up to the United States U23 national team, taking part in a college identification training camp ahead of the 2015 CONCACAF Men's Olympic Qualifying Championship. After returning to Penn State, he was named as a team captain for the Nittany Lions; Maloney responded by leading the team in shots, shots on goal, and goals. He tallied seven goals and two assists on the year, including a pair of two-goal performances in midseason. Although Penn State failed to qualify for the NCAA Tournament for the first time in three years, Maloney was named to the All-Big Ten First Team for the second consecutive season. As a senior, he was again named as a captain and led the team with eight goals, five assists, and 25 shots on goal. Maloney capped the season by being named to the All-Big Ten First Team, the third consecutive year he was honored as such, and was named to the All-Great Lakes Region Second Team by the NSCAA. He finished his Penn State career with 27 goals from 75 appearances.

=== Reading United ===
Following his freshman season with the Nittany Lions, Maloney spent time with Reading United of the Premier Development League. He made just one appearance, playing for six minutes, during his brief stint with the club.

== Club career ==
=== Columbus Crew ===
"His attitude and his mindset are fantastic. He’s a guy that, if you have 25 Connor Maloneys on your team, you know exactly what you are getting on your group. Your group will be hard working, it will be fighting every day and giving 100 percent all the time."

— Columbus head coach Gregg Berhalter, speaking about Maloney in April 2018.

==== 2017–2018: Loans to Pittsburgh ====
Maloney was selected 49th overall in the 2017 MLS SuperDraft by Columbus Crew. Although he played as a forward in college, he changed positions as a professional to become a defender, capable of playing at either outside back position. After taking part in preseason camp, Maloney officially signed with the club on February 20. He made his professional debut less than a month later, in a match against Houston Dynamo on March 11. With Columbus trailing at halftime, he entered in place of Harrison Afful and played the final 45 minutes of a 3–1 defeat for the Crew. On May 19, Maloney was sent on loan to Pittsburgh Riverhounds, the Crew's United Soccer League affiliate. The loan was on a match-by-match basis, with Maloney able to be recalled by Columbus at any time. He made his debut for the Hounds the next day, starting and playing 61 minutes in a 1–0 defeat to Louisville City. Maloney played just once more while on loan and returned to Columbus after those two appearances. He appeared in one more game after being recalled by the Crew, making his first professional start and tallying an assist against Real Salt Lake in late July. His season ended after undergoing a meniscectomy on his left knee on October 24, just two days before the club's first playoff game. On December 1, Maloney had his contract option picked up by the Crew.

After being unable to find the field in Columbus in early 2018, Maloney was again sent on loan to Pittsburgh on May 25, 2018. He made his second debut for the Riverhounds the next day, starting and playing 86 minutes of a scoreless draw against Penn FC. After again making just one more appearance for Pittsburgh, Maloney was recalled by the Crew. He went on to make two appearances in Columbus over the remainder of the season. In his one league appearance, he replaced Milton Valenzuela in the 62nd minute of a game against Portland Timbers on September 19 and provided his second career assist on a Niko Hansen goal three minutes into stoppage time. On November 19, Maloney was named as the recipient of the Kirk Urso Heart Award as "the player that best exemplified the qualities in a teammate and became 'the heart'" in the club's locker room. The club exercised the option on Maloney's contract on November 26.

==== 2019: Playing time in Columbus ====
Under new head coach Caleb Porter, Maloney began the 2019 season as the fourth-choice outside back, sitting behind Harrison Afful, Waylon Francis, and Hector Jiménez on the depth chart. He played just 15 minutes in one substitute appearance through the first five months of the season, but jumped into the lineup in August with multiple players out injured. Playing as a left back for the first time in his career, Maloney went on to start the Crew's final nine matches of the season. He was praised by Porter for his work rate and for "punching above his weight". Maloney finished the year with 11 appearances in all competitions, after he had played just eight total professional matches across his first two pro seasons. At the roster decision deadline ahead of the 2020 season, the Crew declined the option on Maloney's contract, ending his time with the club after three seasons. He went unselected in the 2019 MLS Re-Entry Draft.

=== San Antonio FC ===
Following his release from Columbus, Maloney joined USL Championship club San Antonio FC on January 6, 2020. He scored a goal in a preseason loss against FC Dallas before making his club debut in a 1–0 victory over Real Monarchs on March 7. Maloney appeared in 16 matches on the year, keeping his starting spot after the season was paused due to the COVID-19 pandemic and then resumed in July. He tallied two assists, both coming in September, in victories against Rio Grande Valley FC Toros and OKC Energy. Although San Antonio qualified for the 2020 USL Championship Playoffs, they were eliminated in the conference quarterfinals by New Mexico United. Maloney was substituted in the 68th minute. His contract with the club expired at the end of the season, but Maloney re-signed with San Antonio on January 7, 2021.

As he returned for his second season in San Antonio, Maloney was "projected to reprise [a] prominent role" by the San Antonio Express-News. However, he suffered a lower body injury, missed the first 12 games of the year, and did not return to the field until mid-July. Maloney then settled into a utility player role, appearing at five different positions while starting all but one of his 23 total games played. During the 2021 USL Championship Playoffs, he provided two assists and, in the conference final against Orange County SC, scored his attempt during the penalty shoot-out. Maloney re-signed with San Antonio for a third season on January 21, 2022.

During the 2022 USL Championship Playoffs, Maloney scored the game-winner in the Western Conference final against Colorado Springs Switchbacks on November 6.

== Personal life ==
Maloney graduated from Penn State with a degree in kinesiology. His older sister, Kelsie, played four years of college soccer at West Virginia; one brother, Austin, also played soccer at Penn State; and another brother, Ryan, played soccer at Bishop McDevitt. All three of the brothers were coached by their father, Terence, while in high school.

== Career statistics ==
As of November 24, 2022

Appearances and goals by club, season and competition
Club	Season	League			Cup (Note: All appearances in the U.S. Open Cup)		Continental		Other		Total	
Club	Season	Division	Apps	Goals	Apps	Goals	Apps	Goals	Apps	Goals	Apps	Goals
Reading United	2014	PDL	1	0	0	0	—		0	0	1	0
Columbus Crew	2017	Major League Soccer	2	0	0	0	—		0	0	2	0
Columbus Crew	2018	Major League Soccer	1	0	1	0	—		0	0	2	0
Columbus Crew	2019	Major League Soccer	10	0	1	0	—		—		11	0
Columbus Crew	Total		13	0	2	0	0	0	0	0	15	0
Pittsburgh Riverhounds (loan)	2017	USL	2	0	0	0	—		—		2	0
Pittsburgh Riverhounds (loan)	2018	USL	2	0	0	0	—		0	0	2	0
San Antonio FC	2020	USL Championship	15	0	—		—		1 (Note: Appearance(s) in the USL Championship playoffs)	0	16	0
San Antonio FC	2021	USL Championship	20	0	—		—		3	0	23	0
San Antonio FC	2022	USL Championship	33	0	3	1	—		3	1	39	2
San Antonio FC	2023	USL Championship	0	0	0	0	—		0	0	0	0
San Antonio FC	Total		68	0	3	1	0	0	7	1	78	2
Career total			86	0	5	1	0	0	7	1	98	2

== Honors ==
Philadelphia Union

- Generation Adidas Cup: 2012

Penn State

- Big Ten Conference (regular season): 2013

San Antonio FC

- USL Championship (regular season): 2022
- USL Championship Final: 2022

Individual

- All-Big Ten Freshman Team: 2013
- Big Ten Offensive Player of the Year: 2014
- All-Big Ten First Team: 2014, 2015, 2016
- NSCAA All-Great Lakes Region Second Team: 2016
- Kirk Urso Heart Award: 2018

== See also ==
- All-time Columbus Crew roster
- List of people from Pennsylvania
