= Santiago Viera =

Uruguayan footballer (born 1998)

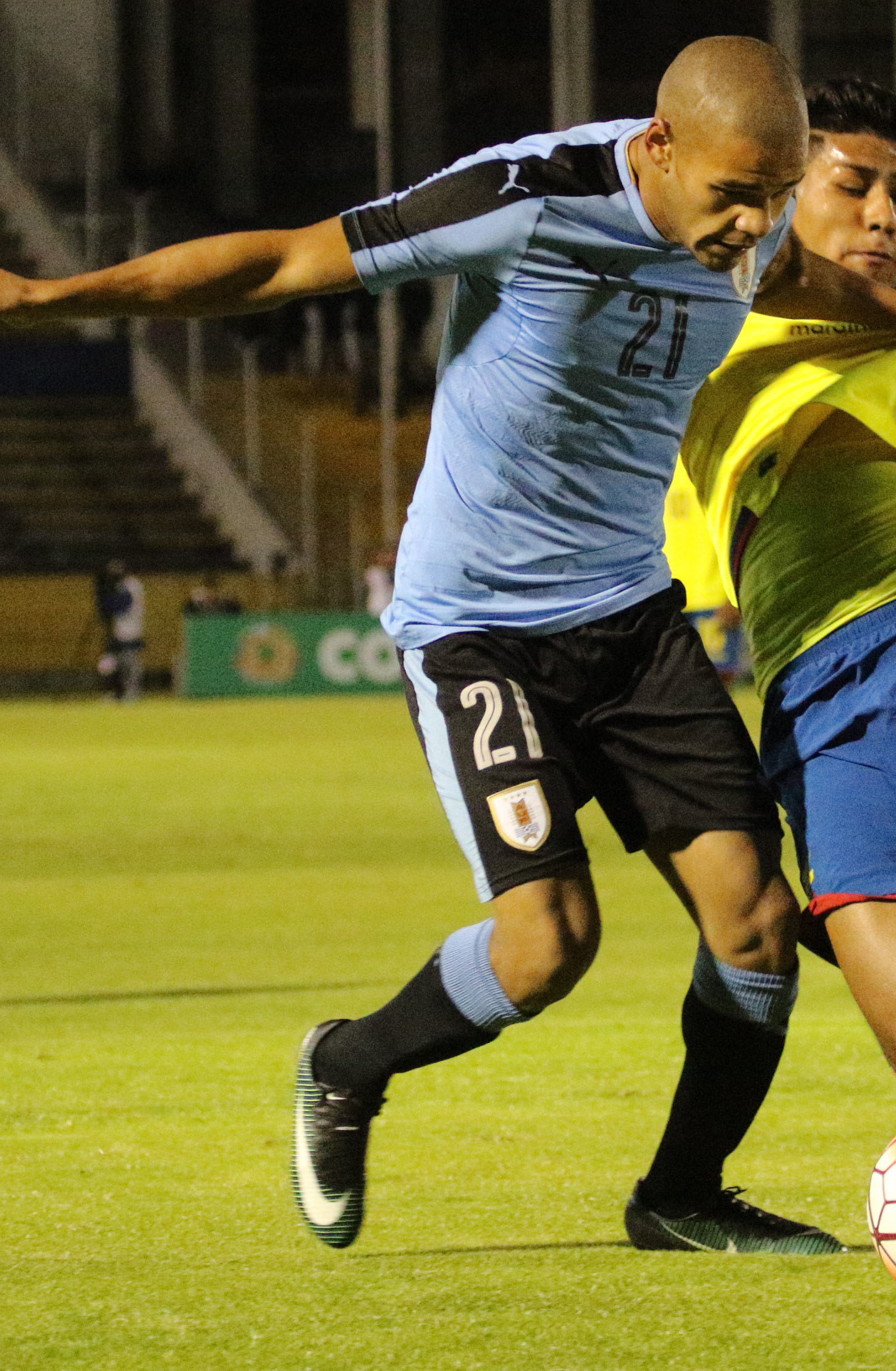

Personal information
- Full name: Santiago Nicolás Viera Moreira
- Date of birth: 4 June 1998 (age 28)
- Place of birth: Montevideo, Uruguay
- Height: 1.76 m (5 ft 9 1/2 in)
- Position: Midfielder

Team information
- Current team: Amazonas
- Number: 13

Youth career
- Liverpool Montevideo

Senior career*
Years	Team	Apps	(Gls)
2016–2022	Liverpool Montevideo	49	(1)
2019	→ Cerro (loan)	29	(2)
2020	→ San Antonio FC (loan)	3	(0)
2022	Juventud	10	(0)
2022–2023	Cerro Largo	39	(0)
2024	Atlético Morelia	6	(0)
2024	Fénix	12	(0)
2025–	Amazonas	3	(0)

International career^{‡}
2016–2017	Uruguay U20	16	(0)
Medal record
Men's football
Representing Uruguay
South American U-20 Championship
Winner	2017 Ecuador
- * Club domestic league appearances and goals as of 18 December 2025 ‡ National team caps and goals as of 11 June 2017

Santiago Nicolás Viera Moreira (born 4 June 1998) is a Uruguayan footballer who plays as a midfielder for Amazonas in the Campeonato Brasileiro Série B.

== Club career ==
Viera joined San Antonio on a season-long loan deal on 15 January 2020.
