= Sam Fink =

Sam Fink (May 27, 1916 – November 1, 2011) was an American calligrapher.

He created illustrated and inscribed editions of various historically significant American documents. His book, The Constitution of the United States of America, was well received. The art from the book was displayed at a courthouse in Pennsylvania. The opening of this showing at the courthouse was broadcast on the international news channel CNN.

Fink released an illustrated version of the Book of Exodus (hand lettered in English and Hebrew) in September 2007 published by Welcome Books.

Fink was an artist of inimitable range who first learned to hand-letter from his father. After marrying his wife Adele, they raised two sons while he studied at the National Academy and the Art Students' League. For two decades, Fink worked as an art director at Young & Rubicam. Later, he taught at Pratt Institute and made professional contributions to the Lands’ End catalog.

For more than 20 years, Fink educated and entertained adults and children with his illustrated texts of American history. He celebrated his 90th birthday in 2006 with the release of The Constitution of the United States of America (Welcome Books) which had won a Gold IPPY. He also published The Declaration of Independence: The Words that Made America (Scholastic), and Welcome Books published Fink's full-color edition of The Gettysburg Address in 2007.
