= Ian Hoffmann =

American soccer player

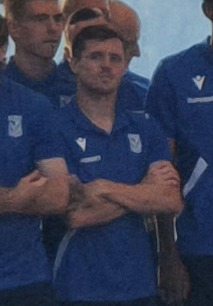
- Hoffmann in 2024 with Lech Poznań

Personal information
- Full name: Ian Jakob Hoffmann
- Date of birth: September 8, 2001 (age 25)
- Place of birth: Wilton, Connecticut, United States
- Height: 5 ft 9 in (1.75 m)
- Position: Full-back

Team information
- Current team: Mjällby (on loan from Lech Poznań)
- Number: 26

Youth career
- Everton FC Westchester
- Beachside SC
- New York Red Bulls
- 2015–2016: 1. FC Köln
- 2016–2020: Karlsruher SC

Senior career*
| Years | Team | Apps | (Gls) |
| 2020 | Rio Grande Valley FC | 5 | (0) |
| 2021–2022 | Houston Dynamo | 6 | (0) |
| 2022 | Houston Dynamo 2 | 9 | (0) |
| 2022 | → Orange County SC (loan) | 15 | (0) |
| 2023–2024 | Moss | 41 | (4) |
| 2024– | Lech Poznań | 2 | (0) |
| 2024 | Lech Poznań II | 5 | (0) |
| 2025 | → Kristiansund (loan) | 25 | (0) |
| 2026 | → HamKam (loan) | 9 | (0) |
| 2026– | → Mjällby (loan) | 5 | (0) |

International career
| 2016–2017 | United States U16 | 5 | (0) |
| 2017 | Germany U17 | | |
| 2018 | United States U18 | 1 | (0) |
| 2018 | Germany U18 | | |
| 2020 | United States U20 | 2 | (1) |
- * Club domestic league appearances and goals as of September 20, 2026

Ian Jakob Hoffmann (born September 8, 2001) is an American professional soccer player who plays as a full-back for Allsvenskan club Mjällby, on loan from Ekstraklasa club Lech Poznań.

== Early life ==
Hoffman was born in Wilton, Connecticut, and spent time with various nearby academy teams such as Everton FC Westchester, Beachside Soccer Club and New York Red Bulls. When his family moved to Germany for work reasons, Ian started playing for 1. FC Köln before moving to Karlsruher SC in 2016. During his time at Karlsruher SC, Hoffman made 40 appearances for the club's under-19 team, scoring 5 goals.

== Club career ==
On July 27, 2020, Hoffmann returned to the United States, joining Major League Soccer side Houston Dynamo. He would officially join the Houston roster on January 1, 2021, spending the remainder of 2020 with the club's USL Championship affiliate club Rio Grande Valley FC. He made his professional debut on August 28, 2020, starting in a 3–1 loss to San Antonio FC. He made 5 appearances and had one assist during his time with RGVFC.

Hoffmann made his Dynamo debut on August 7, 2021, coming on as a substitute in a 2–0 loss to Minnesota United. He appeared in the final four games of the season for Houston, including starting the last two. Hoffman made six appearances during the 2021 season as the Dynamo finished bottom of the Western Conference, failing to qualify for the playoffs.

Hoffmann started the 2022 season playing for Houston Dynamo 2 in MLS Next Pro, making 9 appearances for the Dynamo reserve side.

On June 23, 2022, Hoffmann moved on loan to USL Championship side Orange County SC for the remainder of the season. He made his debut for Orange County on June 25, playing the full match in a 3–1 win vs Loudoun United. Hoffmann made 15 appearances, all starts, while on loan with Orange County, with the team finishing last in the Western Conference. Following the season the Dynamo declined Hoffmann's contract option.

In February 2023, Hoffmann joined Norwegian First Division side Moss FK. During his eighteen-month-long stint in Norway, he scored four goals and recorded eight times in 44 appearances across all competitions.

On August 6, 2024, Hoffmann signed a three-year deal with an option for a further year with Ekstraklasa club Lech Poznań. On February 19, 2025, he returned to Norway to join Kristiansund on a six-month loan with an option to buy. On June 30, 2025, his loan was extended for another six months. After returning to Lech at the end of 2025, he was sent on a six-month loan to another Eliteserien club HamKam on January 16, 2026. On 17 July 2026, he joined Swedish club Mjällby on loan for the rest of the year.

== International career ==
Hoffmann has represented both the United States and Germany at various levels. He qualifies for representing Germany through his grandparents' citizenship.

== Personal life ==
Hoffman's father Andrew played college soccer at Georgetown University and played professionally in the APSL.

Born and raised in Connecticut, Hoffman moved to Germany with his family due to his dad's work in 2015.

== Career statistics ==
As of match played September 20, 2026

Appearances and goals by club, season and competition
| Club | Season | League | | | National cup (Note: Includes U.S. Open Cup, Norwegian Football Cup and Polish Cup) | | League cup | | Continental | | Total | |
| Club | Season | Division | Apps | Goals | Apps | Goals | Apps | Goals | Apps | Goals | Apps | Goals |
|---|---|---|---|---|---|---|---|---|---|---|---|---|
| RIo Grande Valley FC | 2020 | USL Championship | 5 | 0 | — | | — | | — | | 5 | 0 |
| Houston Dynamo | 2021 | Major League Soccer | 6 | 0 | — | | — | | — | | 6 | 0 |
| Houston Dynamo 2 | 2022 | MLS Next Pro | 9 | 0 | — | | 0 | 0 | — | | 9 | 0 |
| Orange County SC (loan) | 2022 | USL Championship | 15 | 0 | 0 | 0 | — | | — | | 15 | 0 |
| Moss | 2023 | 1. divisjon | 25 | 0 | 2 | 0 | — | | — | | 27 | 0 |
| Moss | 2024 | 1. divisjon | 16 | 4 | 1 | 0 | — | | — | | 17 | 4 |
| Moss | Total | | 41 | 4 | 3 | 0 | 0 | 0 | 0 | 0 | 44 | 4 |
| Lech Poznań | 2024–25 | Ekstraklasa | 2 | 0 | 1 | 0 | — | | — | | 3 | 0 |
| Lech Poznań II | 2024–25 | III liga, gr. II | 5 | 0 | 0 | 0 | — | | — | | 5 | 0 |
| Kristiansund (loan) | 2025 | Eliteserien | 25 | 0 | 3 | 0 | — | | — | | 28 | 0 |
| HamKam (loan) | 2026 | Eliteserien | 9 | 0 | 1 | 0 | — | | — | | 10 | 0 |
| Mjällby (loan) | 2026 | Allsvenskan | 5 | 0 | 0 | 0 | — | | 0 | 0 | 5 | 0 |
| Career total | | | 122 | 4 | 8 | 0 | 0 | 0 | 0 | 0 | 130 | 4 |
