= Jonathan Jimenez (soccer, born 1997) =

American soccer player

Personal information
- Date of birth: 17 December 1997 (age 28)
- Place of birth: Cape Coral, Florida, United States
- Height: 5 ft 11 in (1.80 m)
- Positions: Defender; midfielder

Team information
- Current team: Tampa Bay Strikers
- Number: 8

College career
Years	Team	Apps	(Gls)
2016–2017	Seton Hall Pirates	29	(4)
2018–2019	Pacific Tigers	21	(8)

Senior career*
Years	Team	Apps	(Gls)
2017	Lakeland Tropics	12	(0)
2018–2019	Portland Timbers U23s	14	(0)
2020	Rio Grande Valley FC	9	(1)
2022–	Florida Premier	25	
2023–	Tampa Bay Strikers (indoor)	0	(0)
- * Club domestic league appearances and goals as of 13 January 2023 ‡ National team caps and goals as of 31 January 2021

Jonathan Jimenez (born 17 December 1997) is a Trinidadian footballer who plays for Florida Premier FC in the United Premier Soccer League and for the Tampa Bay Strikers in the National Indoor Soccer League.

== Career ==
=== Youth and college ===
Jimenez played two years of college soccer at Seton Hall University between 2016 and 2017, before transferring to the University of the Pacific in California in 2018. At Seton Hall Jimenez played 29 games, scoring 4 goals and tallying 9 assists. At Pacific, Jimenez made 21 appearances, scored 8 goals and tallied 5 assists.

While at college, Jimenez appeared for USL League Two sides Lakeland Tropics in 2017, and Portland Timbers U23s during their 2018 and 2019 seasons.

=== Professional ===
On 9 January 2020, Jimenez was selected 26th overall in the 2020 MLS SuperDraft by Chicago Fire. However, he did not sign with the club.

On 9 July 2020, Jimenez joined USL Championship side Rio Grande Valley FC. He made his debut on 19 July 2020, appearing as an 82nd-minute substitute in a 1–1 draw with San Antonio FC. Rio Grande Valley opted to decline Jimenez's contract option following their 2020 season.

== International career ==
Jimenez was called up to the Trinidad & Tobago national team for their friendly game on 31 January 2021 against the United States.

== Personal life ==
His parents are from Trinidad and Costa Rica.
