= Cristian Parano =

Argentine footballer (born 1999)

Personal information
- Full name: Cristian Agustín Parano Rasguido
- Date of birth: 16 August 1999 (age 27)
- Place of birth: Aguilares, Argentina
- Height: 1.67 m (5 ft 6 in)
- Position: Attacking midfielder

Team information
- Current team: San Antonio FC
- Number: 19

Youth career
- 2010–2014: Boca Juniors
- 2014–2017: River Plate
- 2017–2018: San Martín

Senior career*
Years	Team	Apps	(Gls)
2018	San Martín	1	(0)
2019–2020	San Antonio FC	46	(11)
2021–2023	Paços de Ferreira	0	(0)
2021–2022	→ Chania FC (loan)	16	(1)
2022–2023	→ San Antonio FC (loan)	10	(1)
2023	San Antonio FC	11	(2)
2023–2025	Sacramento Republic	63	(8)
2026–	San Antonio FC	27	(6)
- * Club domestic league appearances and goals as of November 10, 2026

Cristian Agustín Parano Rasguido (born 16 August 1999) is an Argentine professional footballer who plays as an attacking midfielder for USL Championship club San Antonio FC.

== Career ==
=== Early career ===
Parano's early youth career included a spell with one of Barcelona's affiliate clubs in Buenos Aires from the age of nine, prior to the midfielder signing with Boca Juniors' academy in 2010. Four years later, he switched to rivals River Plate. In 2017, Parano moved to San Martín. His professional debut arrived on 4 May 2018 during a Primera División home defeat to Vélez Sarsfield, he had previously been an unused substitute for a fixture with Olimpo in April.

=== San Antonio FC ===
On 31 January 2019, following a successful trial, Parano joined USL Championship side San Antonio FC. His first senior goal came on 21 June in a loss at Chukchansi Park versus Fresno FC.

Parano scored a brace in USL over Reno 1868 on 10 August in a win away from home; for which he was voted as the league's Player of the Week. He netted his fifth goal of the campaign on 17 August, in what was his first South Texas Derby at home against Rio Grande Valley FC Toros. A week later, Parano scored two further goals – and got two assists – in a 5–0 win over New Mexico United; the club's biggest victory at that time. That performance won him the Player of the Week award, which he won for the second time in three weeks. He lost to Solomon Asante for the Player of the Month award for August; despite topping the fan vote.

Fresh from winning the league's 2019 Young Player of the Year award, Parano began the subsequent season with a goal on matchday one against rivals Rio Grande Valley FC Toros. He ended the campaign with four goals in fifteen matches as they reached the play-offs; losing out to New Mexico United in the opening round.

=== Paços de Ferreira ===
On 5 January 2021, Parano completed a move to Portuguese football with Primeira Liga side Paços de Ferreira; penning a three-and-a-half-year contract.

==== Chania FC (loan) ====
Parano spent the 2021–22 season on loan with Super League Greece 2 club Chania FC.

==== San Antonio FC (loan) ====
On 17 August 2022, San Antonio announced that Parano would return to the club on loan from Paços de Ferreira for the remainder of the 2022 USL Championship season.

=== Return to San Antonio FC ===
On 2 February 2023, San Antonio FC announced that they had signed Parano to return to the club as a regular member.

=== Sacramento Republic FC ===
On 16 August 2023, Sacramento Republic acquired Parano's rights and signed him to a multi-year contract.

=== Return to San Antonion FC ===
In December 2025, Parano agreed to a multi-year contract with San Antonio FC marking his third chapter with the club.

== Career statistics ==
As of 5 January 2021.

Club statistics
Club	Season	League			Cup		League Cup		Continental		Other		Total	
Club	Season	Division	Apps	Goals	Apps	Goals	Apps	Goals	Apps	Goals	Apps	Goals	Apps	Goals
San Martín	2017–18	Primera División	1	0	0	0	—		—		0	0	1	0
San Martín	2018–19	Primera División	0	0	0	0	—		—		0	0	0	0
San Martín	Total		1	0	0	0	—		—		0	0	1	0
San Antonio FC	2019	USL Championship	32	7	1	0	—		—		0	0	33	7
San Antonio FC	2020	USL Championship	14	4	0	0	—		—		1 (Note: Appearance(s) in the USL Championship play-offs)	0	15	4
San Antonio FC	Total		46	11	1	0	—		—		1	0	48	11
Paços de Ferreira	2020–21	Primeira Liga	0	0	0	0	0	0	—		0	0	0	0
Career total			47	11	1	0	0	0	—		1	0	49	11

== Honours ==
San Antonio FC

- USL Championship Young Player of the Year: 2019
