= Taiberson =

Brazilian footballer

Personal information
- Full name: Taiberson Ruan Menezes Nunes
- Date of birth: 18 November 1993 (age 32)
- Place of birth: Alegrete, Brazil
- Height: 1.71 m (5 ft 7 1/2 in)
- Position: Winger

Youth career
- 2008–2010: Internacional
- 2010: Juventude
- 2010–2012: Atlético Paranaense

Senior career*
Years	Team	Apps	(Gls)
2012–2014	Atlético Paranaense	8	(0)
2013	→ América de Natal (loan)	0	(0)
2014–2018	Internacional	18	(1)
2016	→ Ponte Preta (loan)	0	(0)
2016	→ Náutico (loan)	8	(2)
2017	→ Juventude (loan)	0	(0)
2018	→ CSA (loan)	8	(0)
2019	Veranópolis	0	(0)
2019	Caxias	6	(0)
2020	Rio Grande Valley FC	7	(1)
- * Club domestic league appearances and goals as of 13:42, 6 October 2020 (UTC)

Taiberson Ruan Menezes Nunes (born 18 November 1993), simply known as Taiberson, is a Brazilian footballer who plays as a winger.

== Club career ==
Taiberson was born in Alegrete, Rio Grande do Sul, and was an Atlético Paranaense youth graduate. On 11 July 2012, he made his first team debut, coming on as a late substitute for Marcelo Cirino in a 1–0 home win against Ipatinga for the Série B championship.

On 1 March 2013, Taiberson was loaned to América-RN until the end of the year. On 30 April, however, he returned to his parent club.

In April 2014, Taiberson was demoted by Furacão, and subsequently joined Internacional, club he already represented as a youth. Initially assigned to the under-23s, he made his first team – and Série A – debut on 9 November, replacing Nilmar in a 1–4 away loss against fierce rivals Grêmio.

On 29 November 2014, Taiberson scored his first professional goal, netting the first in a 3–1 home win against Palmeiras. On 18 December, he extended his contract for a further three seasons.

On 4 January 2016, Taiberson was loaned to fellow league team Ponte Preta, until December.

On 7 January 2020, Taiberson joined USL Championship side Rio Grande Valley FC.

== Honours ==
Internacional

- Campeonato Gaúcho: 2015

CSA

- Campeonato Alagoano: 2018
