= Ignacio Bailone =

Argentine footballer

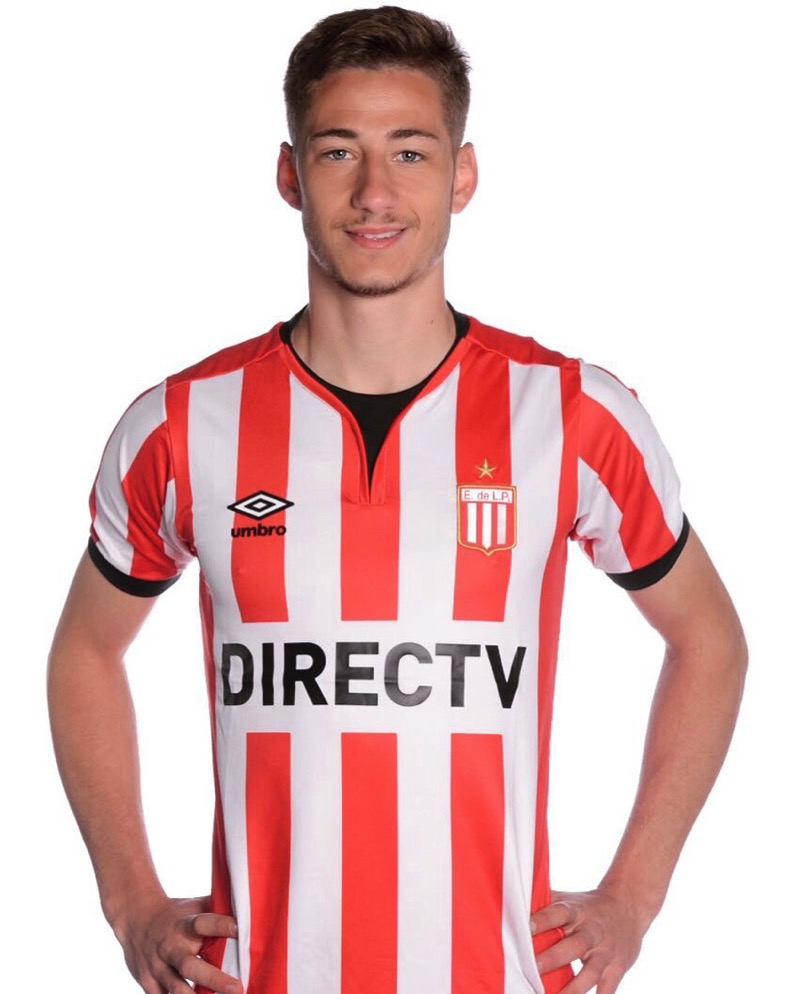
- Bailone with Estudiantes de La Plata

Personal information
- Full name: Ignacio Daniel Bailone
- Date of birth: January 20, 1994 (age 32)
- Place of birth: Rosario, Argentina
- Height: 1.91 m (6 ft 3 in)
- Position: Forward

Team information
- Current team: Nacional
- Number: 7

Youth career
- 2008–2011: Quilmes MDQ

Senior career*
Years	Team	Apps	(Gls)
2012–2016	Lanús	1	(0)
2016–2019	Estudiantes	7	(2)
2017	→ Quilmes (loan)	3	(0)
2017–2018	→ Instituto (loan)	19	(1)
2018–2019	→ Gimnasia Jujuy (loan)	17	(3)
2019	Chacarita Juniors	4	(0)
2020	San Antonio FC	17	(3)
2021–2022	HNK Šibenik	17	(0)
2022–2023	San Antonio FC	55	(11)
2024	Nacional	22	(1)
2024	Cuenca	11	(0)
2025–	Nacional	6	(0)
- * Club domestic league appearances and goals as of 13 August 2025

Ignacio Bailone (born January 20, 1994) is an Argentine footballer who plays as a forward for Paraguayan club Nacional. He made his professional debut for Argentine club Lanús in 2013.

== Career ==
=== Childhood ===
Ignacio Bailone was born on January 20, 1994, in the city of Rosario. He started very young in the Club Deportivo Norte city of Mar del Plata, which already insinuated his footballing virtues as a forward scorer. Then he entered the Club Cadets of San Martin of that city, repeating an excellent performance.

In 2007, he went on to wear the shirt Quilmes Athletic Club of Mar del Plata.

=== Quilmes Athletic Club of Mar del Plata ===
His time at the club was extremely successful since for 4 consecutive years was Marplatense League scorer of the different categories in which he participated. His good performance led him to join in 2010, the Pre-selected Argentine U-17, directed by Pablo Cavallero.

Among the most significant achievements wearing the jersey are:

- Champion of League Marplatense, Division 6 (top scorer with 27 goals, 2010)
- Champion of League Marplatense, Division 7 (top scorer with 23 goals, 2009)
- Second position on the League Marplatense, Division 8 (top scorer with 22 goals, 2008)

In 2010, he debuted in the first division of soccer marplatense against Talleres of Mar del Plata.

=== Club Atlético Lanús ===
In 2010, he signed a contract with Club Atlético Lanús, which allowed him to stand out as a scorer, with 11 goals, in the fifth division of AFA. The same year he was summoned to play the Reserve Tournament against Club Atlético Newell's Old Boys. Same was played in the city of Rosario and ended 1 to 1. "Nacho" started on the eleven and he scored.

In 2011 played in Fourth Division and Reserve AFA. After good performances and goals scored, Guillermo Barros Schelotto and his twin brother, Gustavo Barros Schelotto, he was summoned to participate in the concentration of First Division.

On October 13, 2013, Ignacio debuted in the First Division of AFA against Godoy Cruz Antonio Tomba, playing 15 minutes.

=== Estudiantes de La Plata ===
In the month of August 2016, he signs his relationship with the club platense for two seasons. On August 28 of the same year, he made his debut at Estudiantes de La Plata for the first date of the 2016–17 Primera Championship against Tigre Athletic Club as a visitor. In the last play of the first half, Bailone converted his first goal to find a ball that leaked in an area and started in a free kick from the left run by Lucas Diarte. Author of the first goal and the assists of the two remaining goals, marked by Lucas Rodriguez and Israel Damonte, was the highest point of the Pincha. The match ended with victory of the team of La Platapor 3 to 0. In his second match, against Club Atlético Sarmiento, scored the only goal of the victory head before the 10 'of the first half.

=== Quilmes Atlético Club ===
The April 21, 2017, was incorporated like reinforcement to loan by 2 months, by Quilmes, to maintain the category.

=== Instituto ===
In September 2017, after extending the link with Estudiantes de La Plata until June 2019, he was loaned for a season to "La Gloria" from Córdoba. He played 19 games in the season.

=== Gymnasia de Jujuy ===
In August 2018, he joined the ‘Lobo’ Jujuy. He terminates the contract that linked him to Estudiantes de La Plata, and signs for 1 year, at Club Atlético Gimnasia y Esgrima (Jujuy), with a purchase option of 50% pass. In the "wolf" he played 17 games and scored 3 goals.

=== Chacarita Juniors ===
On July 3, 2019, he signs a contract with Chacarita for one season, with a purchase option of 50% of the pass.

=== San Antonio FC ===
Having the possibility of emigrating to American football, he decided to terminate the contract with Chacarita Juniors and sign with the company Spurs Sports & Entertainment, which owns a football team participating in the USL Championship called San Antonio FC, a one-season contract.

=== HNK Šibenik ===
After a good time in American football, starting in 2021, he signs a contract with Šibenik of the Croatian First League with a period of one and a half years.

== Clubs ==
Club	Country	Year
Lanús	Argentina	2013–2016
Estudiantes (LP)	Argentina	2016–2017
Quilmes (loan)	Argentina	2017
Instituto (loan)	Argentina	2017–2018
Gimnasia (J)	Argentina	2018–2019
Chacarita Juniors	Argentina	2019
San Antonio FC	United States	2020
Šibenik	Croatia	2021–2022

== Career statistics ==
As of January 31, 2021

Club	Season	Div.	Ligue			Cup National *			Cup International**			Total			Prom.
Club	Season	Div.	PJ	G	A	PJ	G	A	PJ	G	A	PJ	G	A	Prom.
CA Lanús; Argentina
CA Lanús; Argentina	2013–14	1.ª	1	0	0	-	-	-	-	-	-	1	0	0	0,00
CA Lanús; Argentina	2014	1.ª	0	0	0	-	-	-	-	-	-	0	0	0	0,00
CA Lanús; Argentina	2015	1.ª	0	0	0	-	-	-	-	-	-	0	0	0	0,00
CA Lanús; Argentina	Total		1	0	0	-	-	-	-	-	-	0	0	0	0,00
Estudiantes LP; Argentina	2016–17	1.ª	7	2	2	3	0	0	1	0	0	11	2	2	0,18
Estudiantes LP; Argentina	Total		7	2	2	3	0	0	1	0	0	11	2	2	0,18
Quilmes AC; Argentina	2016–17	1.ª	3	0	1	1	0	0	-	-	-	4	0	1	0,00
Quilmes AC; Argentina	Total		3	0	1	1	0	0	-	-	-	4	0	1	0,00
Instituto ACC; Argentina	2017–18	2.ª	19	1	3	-	-	-	-	-	-	19	1	3	0,06
Instituto ACC; Argentina	Total		19	1	3	-	-	-	-	-	-	19	1	3	0,06
Gimnasia de Jujuy; Argentina	2018–19	2.ª	17	3	3	-	-	-	-	-	-	17	3	3	0,18
Gimnasia de Jujuy; Argentina	Total		17	3	3	-	-	-	-	-	-	17	3	3	0,18
Chacarita J Argentina	2019–20	2.ª	4	0	0	-	-	-	-	-	-	4	0	0	0,00
Chacarita J Argentina	Total		4	0	0	-	-	-	-	-	-	4	0	0	0,00
San Antonio FC; United States	2020	2.ª	17	3	4	-	-	-	-	-	-	17	3	4	0,18
San Antonio FC; United States	Total		17	3	4	-	-	-	-	-	-	17	3	4	0,18
HNK Šibenik; Croatia	2020–21	1.ª	0	0	0	0	0	0	0	0	0	0	0	0	0,00
HNK Šibenik; Croatia	Total		0	0	0	0	0	0	0	0	0	0	0	0	0,00
Total en su carrera			68	9	13	4	0	0	0	0	0	72	9	13	0,125
