= PC (footballer) =

Brazilian footballer

Personal information
- Full name: Victor Pagliari Giro
- Date of birth: March 10, 1994 (age 32)
- Place of birth: São Paulo, Brazil
- Height: 1.72 m (5 ft 7 1/2 in)
- Positions: Left back; midfielder

Youth career
- 2009–2012: Corinthians

Senior career*
Years	Team	Apps	(Gls)
2013–2015	Corinthians B	0	(0)
2013–2014	→ Belenenses (loan)	0	(0)
2015	→ Fort Lauderdale Strikers (loan)	3	(1)
2015–2016	Fort Lauderdale Strikers	37	(6)
2016	Tampa Bay Rowdies	14	(1)
2017–2018	Orlando City	16	(0)
2017	Orlando City B	6	(0)
2019	Vancouver Whitecaps FC	18	(0)
2020–2023	San Antonio FC	74	(4)
2024	Union Omaha	7	(0)
Total		175	(12)
- * Club domestic league appearances and goals as of 20:34, 21 July 2024 (UTC)

Victor Pagliari Giro (born March 10, 1994), commonly known as PC, is a Brazilian former professional footballer who played as a left back.

== Career ==
=== Corinthians ===
PC began his career in the youth system of Brazilian club Corinthians. He made his debut for Corinthians B in 2013.

He acquired his nickname due to his resemblance to a fellow youth player named Pablo Cesar.

=== Belenenses ===
For the 2013–14 season he was sent on loan to Primeira Liga club Belenenses. He made his debut for the Portuguese club on September 25, 2013, in a Taça da Liga match against C.D. Santa Clara, starting the match in a 0–0 draw.

=== Fort Lauderdale Strikers ===
In early 2015 he was sent on loan to Fort Lauderdale Strikers. On April 11, 2015, he scored his first goal for the Fort Lauderdale Strikers against the Jacksonville Armada FC in a match they won 2–1, earning a spot on the NASL Team of the Week. On April 23, 2015, it was announced that the Strikers had signed PC outright from Corinthians on a multi-year contract.

=== Tampa Bay Rowdies ===
On July 24, 2016, PC was sold to the Tampa Bay Rowdies. He had one goal and one assist in 14 appearances with Tampa Bay.

=== Orlando City ===
On January 4, 2017, it was announced that he was signed by Major League Soccer side Orlando City. On September 24, 2017, PC was shown a red card during a match against the Portland Timbers after he elbowed Diego Chará in the face. PC played in eight MLS games and one further US Open Cup match registering one assist during the 2017 season.

PC scored his first goal with Orlando City on June 6, 2018, in a 2018 U.S. Open Cup match against Miami United FC. He also featured in eight MLS games in 2018. On December 9, 2018, PC was traded to the Vancouver Whitecaps FC in exchange for the Whitecaps' natural third-round pick in the 2019 MLS SuperDraft.

On 20 July 2024, PC announced his retirement from football, effective immediately.
