= 2021 Rio Grande Valley FC season =

Rio Grande Valley FC Toros
2021 season
- Head coach: Wilmer Cabrera
- USL Championship: Mountain Division: 4th Western Conference: 8th
- USL Playoffs: Conference Semi-Finals
- Copa Tejas: 3rd place, Division II
- Biggest win: SLC 0-3 RGV (Aug. 4); RGV 3-0 SLC (Oct. 2); RGV 4-1 ELP (Oct. 30)
- Biggest defeat: RGV 2–5 COS (Aug. 14)
Home colors	Away colors	Third colors

The 2021 Rio Grande Valley FC Toros season was the 6th season for Rio Grande Valley FC Toros in USL Championship (USLC), the second-tier professional soccer league in the United States and Canada. This article covers the period from November 2, 2020, the day after the 2020 USLC Playoff Final, to the conclusion of the 2021 USLC Playoff Final, scheduled for November 28, 2021.

== Club ==
Note: Flags indicate national team as defined under FIFA eligibility rules; some limited exceptions apply. Players may hold more than one non-FIFA nationality. Squad correct as of January 10, 2021.

No.	Pos.	Nation	Player
1	GK	USA	Tyler Deric
2	DF	USA	Carter Manley
4	DF	MEX	Erik Pimentel
5	MF	COL	Juan Cabezas
6	MF	USA	James Murphy
7	FW	VEN	Juan Azócar
8	MF	USA	Rodrigo López
9	FW	CUB	Frank López
11	FW	USA	Vicente Sánchez
12	GK	USA	Colin Miller
13	DF	USA	Camden Riley
14	DF	USA	Zach Jackson
15	DF	CUB	Adrián Diz
17	MF	COL	John Sánchez
18	FW	USA	Adrian Vera
19	DF	VEN	Eduin Quero
20	MF	URU	Christian Sorto
22	DF	USA	Roberto Albuquerque
24	FW	USA	Alexis Cerritos
25	DF	USA	Diego Rocha
26	MF	USA	Josue Soto
27	FW	VIN	Kyle Edwards
28	GK	USA	Javier Garcia
-	DF	ENG	Louis Ramsay
-	MF	MAS	Wan Kuzain
-	MF	USA	Emilio Ycaza (soccer)
-	MF	USA	Grant Robinson
-	MF	GAM	Baboucarr Njie
-	MF	SLV	Andrés Flores
-	FW	NOR	Jonas Fjeldberg
-	FW	GHA	Elvis Amoh

== Competitions ==
=== Pre-season ===
April 24, 2021 Preseason 1	San Antonio FC	2-2	Rio Grande Valley FC Toros	San Antonio, Texas
1:00PM	Patiño 17'; Lindley		90+3'	Stadium: Toyota Field; Attendance: Closed-Door

=== USL Championship ===
==== Match results ====
May 1, 2021 1	Rio Grande Valley FC Toros	1–0	New Mexico United	Edinburg, Texas
	Riley (yellow card) 27'; Robinson (yellow card) 29'; Amoh (yellow card) 44' (goal) 65'	Report	Guzmán (yellow card) 7'; Ryden (yellow card) 17'	Stadium: H-E-B Park; Attendance: 2,567; Referee: Elton Garcia

May 6, 2021 2	Rio Grande Valley FC Toros	1–0	San Diego Loyal SC	Edinburg, Texas
	Kuzain (yellow card) 64'; Sánchez 87'	Report	Martin (yellow card) 27'; Blake (yellow card) 28'; Metcalf (yellow card) 79'	Stadium: H-E-B Park; Attendance: 2195; Referee: Matthew Corrigan

May 16, 2021 3 Copa Tejas	Rio Grande Valley FC Toros	2-1	San Antonio FC	Edinburg, Texas
	Kuzain 42'; Sorto 57'; Robinson (yellow card) 75'; López (yellow card) 90+6'	Report	Pantiño (yellow card) 31' (goal) 68'; Lema (yellow card) 45'; Cuell (yellow card) 45+3'; Khmiri (yellow card) 78'	Stadium: H-E-B Park; Attendance: 2610; Referee: Melvin Rivas

May 22, 2021 4 Copa Tejas	El Paso Locomotive FC	1–0	Rio Grande Valley FC Toros	El Paso, Texas
	Solignac 1'; Ryan (yellow card) 45+2'; Nick Ross (yellow card) 63'; Mares (yellow card) 70'; Borelli (yellow card) 89'	Report	Amoh (yellow card) 70' (yellow-red card) 80'; Njie (yellow card) 90+5'	Stadium: Southwest University Park; Attendance: 6,325; Referee: Lukasz Szpala

May 29, 2021 5 Copa Tejas	San Antonio FC	1–1	Rio Grande Valley FC Toros	San Antonio, Texas
	Lema (yellow card) 34'; Epps 40'; Cuell (red card) 80'	Report	Pimentel (yellow card) 42'; Sánchez (yellow card) 55'; Azócar 89'; Sánchez (yellow card) 90'	Stadium: Toyota Field; Attendance: 3852; Referee: Jon Freemon

June 6, 2021 6	Miami FC	2-4	Rio Grande Valley FC Toros	Miami, FL
	Da Silva 15'; Manley 19' (o.g.); Akinyode (red card) 56'; Da Silva (yellow card) 69'; Palacios (yellow card) 82'; Sparrow (yellow card) 90+6'; Chapman-Page (yellow card) 90+8'	Report	Amoh 51', 66', 90+6'; Craig 69' (o.g.); Murphy (yellow card) 80'	Stadium: FIU Soccer Stadium; Attendance: 8,058; Referee: Jeremy Scheer

June 12, 2021 7	Rio Grande Valley FC Toros	1-0	Real Monarchs SLC	Edinburg, Texas
	Sanchez (yellow card) 28'; Kuzain 60'; Diz Pe (yellow card) 72'; Vera (yellow card) 78'; Amoh (yellow card) 90+4'	Report	Sobowale (red card) 81'	Stadium: H-E-B Park; Attendance: 2,583; Referee: Matthew Thompson

June 16, 2021 8 Copa Tejas	Rio Grande Valley FC Toros	1-2	Austin Bold	Edinburg, Texas
	Diz Pe (yellow card) 13'; Cerritos 21'; Kuzain (yellow card) 58'; Cabezas (yellow card) 75'; Pimentel (yellow card) 82'	Report	Okoli 55' (yellow card) 90'; Garcia 90+6'	Stadium: H-E-B Park; Attendance: 2,572; Referee: Ismir Pekmic

June 19, 2021 9 Copa Tejas	San Antonio FC	1-1	Rio Grande Valley FC Toros	San Antonio, Texas
	Dhillon 13' (yellow card) 17'; Lindley (yellow card) 14'; Varela (yellow card) 66'; Lema (yellow card) 90'; Doyle (yellow card) 90+5'	Report	Sorto 22'; Sánchez (yellow card) 58'; Albuquerque (yellow card) 64'; Sánchez (yellow card) 90+1'	Stadium: Toyota Field; Attendance: 3,920; Referee: Elijio Arreguin

June 25, 2021 10	Rio Grande Valley FC Toros	1-2	FC Tulsa	Edinburg, Texas
	Diz Pe (yellow card) 4'; Njie 90+2'	Report	Rodrigo da Costa 22'; Kibato (yellow card) 25' (yellow-red card) 78'; Sheldon (yellow card) 57'; Kiesewetter (yellow card) 89'	Stadium: H-E-B Park; Attendance: 2,955; Referee: Mark Allatin

June 30, 2021 11 Copa Tejas	Rio Grande Valley FC Toros	3-2	El Paso Locomotive FC	Edinburg, Texas
	Manley 5'; Kuzain 61' (yellow card) 90+3'; López 73'; Vera (yellow card) 87'	Report	Aguinaga 31'; Luna (yellow card) 77'; Solignac 82'	Stadium: H-E-B Park; Attendance: 2,445; Referee: Brandon Stevis

July 7, 2021 12 Copa Tejas	Austin Bold FC	1-1	Rio Grande Valley FC Toros	Austin, Texas
	Hinds (yellow card) 16'; Sarkodie (yellow card) 45+1' (goal) 48'; Adamolekun (yellow card) 88'	Report	Kuzain (yellow card) 45+2'; Cabezas (yellow card) 45+3'; Pimentel (yellow card) 52'; Azócar 62'	Stadium: Bold Stadium; Attendance: 686; Referee: Elijio Arreguin

July 17, 2021 13	Orange County SC	0-2	Rio Grande Valley FC Toros	Irvine, CA
	Drai (yellow card) 7'; Smith (yellow card) 35'; Kuningas (yellow card) 87'; Iloski (yellow card) 87'	Report	Azócar 2'; Vera (yellow card) 47'; Cabezas (yellow card) 54'; Rodrigo López, (soccer, born 1987) 80'	Stadium: Championship Soccer Stadium; Attendance: 2,517; Referee: Ricardo Fierro

July 24, 2021 14 Copa Tejas	Rio Grande Valley FC Toros	1-1	Austin Bold FC	Edinburg, Texas
	Cabezas 8' (yellow card) 56'; López (yellow card) 67'; Deric (yellow card) 85'	Report	Torres (yellow card) 36' (yellow-red card) 50'; Baez (yellow card) 79' (goal) 85'	Stadium: H-E-B Park; Attendance: 3,722; Referee: Brad Jensen

July 31, 2021 15	Phoenix Rising FC	3-1	Rio Grande Valley FC Toros	Phoenix, AZ
	King 14'; Quinn 19'; Dadashov 27'	Report	Azócar 55'; Cerritos (yellow card) 61'	Stadium: Casino Arizona Field; Attendance: 6,740; Referee: Sergii Demianchuk

August 4, 2021 16	Real Monarchs SLC	0-3	Rio Grande Valley FC Toros	Herriman, Utah
	Adams (yellow card) 64'; Ibrahim Bancé (yellow card) 70' (yellow-red card) 76'	Report	Quero 19'; Manley (yellow card) 45+6'; Sánchez 54'; Ramsay (yellow card) 63'; Sorto (yellow card) 68' (goal) 83'; Murphy (yellow card) 70'; Quero (yellow card) 81'	Stadium: Zions Bank Stadium; Attendance: 1,790; Referee: William Hoffman

August 8, 2021 17	Rio Grande Valley FC Toros	1-2	San Antonio FC	Edinburg, Texas
	Azócar 35'; Robinson (yellow card) 38'; Njie (yellow card) 77'; Pimentel (yellow card) 79'	Report	Nathan 18', 58'; Khmiri (yellow card) 50'; Abu (yellow card) 60'; Cardone (yellow card) 78'	Stadium: H-E-B Park; Attendance: 3,495; Referee: Elvis Osmanovic

August 14, 2021 18	Rio Grande Valley FC Toros	2-5	Colorado Springs Switchbacks FC	Edinburg, Texas
	Riley (yellow card) 22'; Azócar 28'; Quero (yellow card) 29'; Kuzain (yellow card) 44'; Vera (yellow card) 49'; Sánchez 59'; Pimentel (yellow card) 67'; Njie (yellow card) 90+3'	Report	Amang (yellow card) 13' (goal) 57'; Barry 37', 73'; Ngalina 69'; Burt (yellow card) 84'; Yapi 89'	Stadium: H-E-B Park; Attendance: 3,018; Referee: Michael Radchuk

August 17, 2021 19 Copa Tejas	Austin Bold FC	1-1	Rio Grande Valley FC Toros	Austin, Texas
	Báez 26'; Diouf (yellow card) 40'; Avila (yellow card) 44'	Report	Diz Pe (yellow card) 8'; Manley (yellow card) 24'; Amoh 38'; Riley (yellow card) 55'	Stadium: Circuit of the Americas#Bold Stadium; Attendance: 531; Referee: Tori Penso

August 21, 2021 20 Copa Tejas	El Paso Locomotive FC	3-1	Rio Grande Valley FC Toros	El Paso, Texas
	Rebellón (yellow card) 7'; Solignac 66'; Velasquez 89'; Mares 90+6'	Report	Murphy (yellow card) 24'; Amoh 38'; Pimentel (yellow card) 82'	Stadium: Southwest University Park; Attendance: 7,017; Referee: Matthew Thompson

August 29, 2021 21	OKC Energy FC	2-1	Rio Grande Valley FC Toros	Oklahoma City, OK
	Chávez 26'; Osmond (yellow card) 35'; Basuljevic 78'; Donovan (yellow card) 84'	Report	Amoh 31'	Stadium: Taft Stadium; Attendance: 1,645; Referee: Elvis Osmanovic

September 4, 2021 22	Rio Grande Valley FC Toros	1-1	Loudoun United FC	Oklahoma City, OK
	Amoh 14'; Pimentel (yellow card) 68'; Sorto (yellow card) 80'	Report	Mehl (yellow card) 13'; Saravia (yellow card) 15'; Ku-Dipietro 20'	Stadium: Taft Stadium; Attendance: 3,052; Referee: Elton García

September 11, 2021 23	Colorado Springs Switchbacks FC	1-1	Rio Grande Valley FC Toros	Colorado Springs, CO
	Ockford (red card) 45'; Hodge (yellow card) 54'; Beckford (yellow card) 83'; Mahoney 90+1'	Report	Pimentel (yellow card) 56'; López 80'; Ycaza (yellow card) 90+2'	Stadium: Weidner Field; Attendance: 6,474; Referee: Elijio Arreguin

September 18, 2021 24	Rio Grande Valley FC Toros	1-2	Colorado Springs Switchbacks FC	Edinburg, Texas
	Amoh (yellow card) 9'; Ycaza 26'; Manley (yellow card) 41'; Cabezas (yellow card) 55'; Sorto (yellow card) 63'	Report	Zandi (yellow card) 17'; Barry 49', 81'	Stadium: H-E-B Park; Attendance: 2,905; Referee: Lukasz Szpala

September 25, 2021 25	Rio Grande Valley FC Toros	3-2	Atlanta United 2	Edinburg, Texas
	Flores (yellow card) 19'; Amoh 30'; Diz Pe 49' (yellow card) 84'; Fjeldberg 65'; Njie (yellow card) 72'; Azócar (yellow card) 90+3'; López (yellow card) 90+8'; Ycaza (yellow card) 90+9'	Report	Diop 3'; Fewo (yellow card) 26'; Matheus 44'	Stadium: H-E-B Park; Attendance: 3,017; Referee: Ricardo Fierro

September 29, 2021 26	New Mexico United	2-0	Rio Grande Valley FC Toros	Albuquerque, NM
	Muhummad 18' (yellow card) 89'; Moreno (yellow card) 64'; Suggs (yellow card) 85'; Sandoval (yellow card) 90'; Wehan 90+6'	Report	Diz Pe (yellow card) 54'	Stadium: Isotopes Park; Attendance: 5,377; Referee: Adam Kilpatrick

October 2, 2021 27	Rio Grande Valley FC Toros	3-0	Real Monarchs SLC	Edinburg, Texas
	Amoh 28'; Manley 42' (yellow card) 87'; Fjeldberg (yellow card) 68' (goal) 76'; Rodrigo López (soccer, born 1987) (yellow card) 77'	Report	Saucedo (yellow card) 41'; Adams (yellow card) 50'; Orozco (yellow card) 65'	Stadium: H-E-B Park; Attendance: 2,781; Referee: Jonathan Bilinski

October 9, 2021 28	New Mexico United	1-1	Rio Grande Valley FC Toros	Albuquerque, NM
	Ryden (yellow card) 19'; Wehan 24'; Bruce (yellow card) 52'; Rivas (yellow card) 57'	Report	Amoh 5' (yellow card) 90+4'; Pimentel (yellow card) 32'; López (yellow card) 90+3'	Stadium: Isotopes Park; Attendance: 6,934; Referee: Malik Badawi

October 16, 2021 29	Colorado Springs Switchbacks FC	1-0	Rio Grande Valley FC Toros	Colorado Springs, CO
	Torres (yellow card) 27'; Makangila (yellow card) 45+1'; Amang 90+4'	Report	Ycaza (yellow card) 82'; Flores (yellow card) 89'; López (yellow card) 90+6'	Stadium: Weidner Field; Attendance: 8,023; Referee: Joshua Encarnación

October 23, 2021 30	Rio Grande Valley FC Toros	2-0	New Mexico United	Edinburg, Texas
	López 47' (yellow card) 59'; Edwards 58'	Report	Tetteh (yellow card) 78'	Stadium: H-E-B Park; Attendance: 4118; Referee: Brandon Stevis

October 27, 2021 31	Real Monarchs SLC	1-3	Rio Grande Valley FC Toros	Herriman, Utah
	Davis (yellow card) 34'; Diz Pe 41' (o.g.); Nydegger (yellow card) 64'; Halsey (yellow card) 75'	Report	Sorto 16' (yellow card) 54'; Fjeldberg 62'; López 66'Murphy (yellow card) 88'	Stadium: Zions Bank Stadium; Attendance: 1,688; Referee: Brad Jensen

October 30, 2021 32 Copa Tejas	Rio Grande Valley FC Toros	4-1	El Paso Locomotive FC	Edinburg, Texas
	López 7'; Ycaza (yellow card) 12' (goal) 80'; Azócar (yellow card) 45+2'; Edwards 45+4', 59' (yellow card) 45+4'; Vera (yellow card) 90+1'	Report	Borelli (yellow card) 45'; Herrera 52'	Stadium: H-E-B Park; Attendance: 4,440; Referee: John Griggs

==== Standings — Western Conference ====
Pos	Div	Team	Pld	W	D	L	GF	GA	GD	Pts	Qualification
1	PC	Phoenix Rising FC	32	20	7	5	68	35	+33	67	Playoffs
2	MT	El Paso Locomotive FC	32	18	10	4	56	34	+22	64	Playoffs
3	PC	Orange County SC	32	15	7	10	44	37	+7	52	Playoffs
4	MT	San Antonio FC	32	14	10	8	50	38	+12	52	Playoffs
5	MT	Colorado Springs Switchbacks FC	32	13	10	9	60	50	+10	49	Playoffs
6	PC	San Diego Loyal SC	32	14	6	12	51	43	+8	48	Playoffs
7	MT	Rio Grande Valley FC Toros	32	13	8	11	49	42	+7	47	Playoffs
8	MT	New Mexico United	32	12	10	10	44	40	+4	46	
9	MT	Austin Bold FC	32	10	12	10	32	42	−10	42	
10	PC	Oakland Roots SC	32	11	8	13	36	43	−7	41	Playoffs
11	PC	LA Galaxy II	32	11	6	15	55	57	−2	39	
12	PC	Tacoma Defiance	32	10	9	13	37	41	−4	39	
13	PC	Sacramento Republic FC	32	8	12	12	36	42	−6	36	
14	MT	Real Monarchs	32	5	7	20	28	56	−28	22	
15	PC	Las Vegas Lights FC	32	6	3	23	41	77	−36	21	

Source: USL Championship
Rules for classification: 1) points; 2) head-to-head points; 3) head-to-head goal differential; 4) total points earned against in-division opponents; 5) total regular season wins against in-division opponents; 6) total goal differential against in-division opponents; 7) total goals scored against in-division opponents; 8) disciplinary points; 9) coin toss or drawing of lots.

=== Play-Offs ===
November 6, 2021 Conference Quarterfinals	Phoenix Rising FC	3-3 (a.e.t.) (3-4 p)	Rio Grande Valley FC Toros	Phoenix, AZ
	Asante 23', 101' (yellow card) 73'; Rodriguez (yellow card) 39' (goal) 54'; Moar (yellow card) 120+1'	Report	Njie 19' (yellow card) 22'; Cabezas (yellow card) 37'; Pimetel (yellow card) 66'; López 71' (yellow card) 72'; Amoh 109'	Stadium: Casino Arizona Field; Attendance: 8,234; Referee: Brandon Stevis
	Penalties
	Bakero (penalty scored); Farrell (penalty scored); Moar (penalty scored)		Njie (penalty scored); Ycaza (penalty scored); Pimentel (penalty scored); Amoh (penalty scored)

November 13, 2021 Conference Semi-Finals	San Antonio FC	3-1	Rio Grande Valley FC Toros	San Antonio, TX
	Patino 24', 55'; Nathan 61'; Victor Giro (yellow card) 73'; Farr (yellow card) 84'	Report	Cabezas (yellow card) 43'; Edwards (yellow card) 45+1'; Azócar (yellow card) 64'; Amoh 69'	Stadium: Toyota Field; Attendance: 7,966; Referee: Mark Allatin

=== U.S. Open Cup ===
2021 U.S. Open Cup was cancelled due to the COVID-19 Pandemic

=== Statistics ===
Numbers after plus-sign(+) denote appearances as a substitute.

==== Appearances and goals ====
No.	Pos	Nat	Player	Total		USL Championship Regular Season		Playoffs	
No.	Pos	Nat	Player	Apps	Goals	Apps	Goals	Apps	Goals
2	DF	(United States) USA	Carter Manley	33	2	26+5	2	2	0
4	DF	(Mexico) MEX	Erik Pimentel	29	0	27+0	0	2	0
5	MF	(Colombia) COL	Juan Cabezas	19	1	13+4	1	2	0
6	MF	(United States) USA	James Murphy	23	0	14+9	0	0	0
7	FW	(Venezuela) VEN	Juan Azócar	27	6	17+8	6	2	0
8	MF	(United States) USA	Rodrigo López	33	6	26+5	5	2	1
9	FW	(Ghana) GHA	Elvis Amoh	22	13	17+3	11	2	2
11	FW	(United States) USA	Vicente Sánchez	31	2	4+25	2	2	0
12	GK	(United States) USA	Colin Miller	8	0	4+2	0	2	0
13	MF	(El Salvador) SLV	Andrés Flores	16	0	13+1	0	2	0
14	MF	(The Gambia) GAM	Baboucarr Njie	28	2	12+14	1	2	1
15	DF	(Cuba) CUB	Adrián Diz	23	1	19+2	1	2	0
17	MF	(Colombia) COL	John Sánchez	16	1	7+7	1	2	0
18	FW	(United States) USA	Adrian Vera	27	0	14+13	0	0	0
19	DF	(Venezuela) VEN	Eduin Quero	4	0	2+2	0	0	0
20	MF	(Uruguay) URU	Christian Sorto	32	4	25+6	4	1	0
22	DF	(United States) USA	Roberto Albuquerque	16	0	12+4	0	0	0
24	FW	(United States) USA	Alexis Cerritos	22	1	9+11	1	2	0
26	MF	(United States) USA	Josue Soto	4	0	2+2	0	0	0
27	FW	(Saint Vincent and the Grenadines) VIN	Kyle Edwards	14	3	6+6	3	2	0
28	GK	(United States) USA	Javier Garcia	0	0	0+0	0	0	0
-	DF	(England) ENG	Louis Ramsay	6	0	4+2	0	0	0
-	MF	(Malaysia) MAS	Wan Kuzain	19	0	12+7	0	0	0
-	MF	(United States) USA	Grant Robinson	9	0	7+2	0	0	0
-	DF	(United States) USA	Camden Riley	16	0	10+6	0	0	0
-	FW	(Norway) NOR	Jonas Fjeldberg	8	3	8+0	3	0	0
-	FW	(Norway) NOR	Emilio Ycaza	30	2	20+10	2	0	0

- Last updated: March 12, 2022
- Source: https://www.uslchampionship.com/rio-grande-valley-fc-player-stats-2021
