= 2021 USL Championship season =

11th season of the USL Championship

USL Championship
- Season: 2021
- Dates: April 24 – October 30
- Champions: Orange County SC (1st title)
- Regular season title: Tampa Bay Rowdies (1st Title)
- Matches: 498
- Goals: 1,421 (2.85 per match)
- Best player: (Guinea) Hadji Barry Colorado Springs Switchbacks FC
- Top goalscorer: (Guinea) Hadji Barry Colorado Springs Switchbacks FC (25 Goals)
- Best goalkeeper: (United States) Evan Louro Tampa Bay Rowdies
- Biggest home win: HFD 7–0 NYRB (June 5)
- Biggest away win: LDN 0–5 CLT (September 8)
- Highest scoring: LVL 3–6 PHX (October 16)
- Longest winning run: 9 matches TBR
- Longest unbeaten run: 12 matches TBR
- Longest winless run: 13 matches LVL
- Longest losing run: 10 matches LVL
- Highest attendance: 12,115; LOU 3–0 MEM (June 12)
- Lowest attendance: 0 Various
- Total attendance: 1,742,808
- Average attendance: 4,138

The 2021 USL Championship season was the eleventh season of the USL Championship and the fifth season under Division II sanctioning. This was the third season under the name "USL Championship", having used the name "United Soccer League" through 2018. The 2021 season saw 31 teams participate in four divisions during the regular season.

== Changes from 2020 ==
Expansion clubs

- Oakland Roots SC (joined from NISA)

Departing clubs

- North Carolina FC (moved to USL League One)
- Philadelphia Union II (withdrawn by MLS parent club)
- Portland Timbers 2 (withdrawn by MLS parent club)
- Reno 1868 FC (folded)
- Saint Louis FC (folded in favor of future St. Louis City SC of MLS)

== Teams ==
Locations of teams for the 2021 USL Championship season
Pacific Division Mountain Division Central Division Atlantic Division

The following teams are playing in the 2021 USL Championship season:

Team	Location	Stadium	Capacity	Head coach	MLS affiliate / ownership
Atlanta United 2	Kennesaw, Georgia	Fifth Third Bank Stadium	8,318	(Wales) Jack Collison	Atlanta United FC
Austin Bold FC	Austin, Texas	Bold Stadium	5,000	(Jamaica) Ryan Thompson	
Birmingham Legion FC	Birmingham, Alabama	BBVA Field	5,000	(United States) Tom Soehn	
Charleston Battery	Mount Pleasant, South Carolina	Patriots Point Soccer Complex	3,900	(United States) Mike Anhaeuser	
Charlotte Independence	Matthews, North Carolina	Sportsplex at Matthews	5,000	(United States) Mike Jeffries	
Colorado Springs Switchbacks FC	Colorado Springs, Colorado	Weidner Field	8,000	(United States) Brendan Burke	Colorado Rapids
FC Tulsa	Tulsa, Oklahoma	ONEOK Field	7,833	(United States) Michael Nsien	
El Paso Locomotive FC	El Paso, Texas	Southwest University Park	9,500	(England) Mark Lowry	
Hartford Athletic	Hartford, Connecticut	Dillon Stadium	5,500	(England) Harry Watling	
Indy Eleven	Indianapolis, Indiana	IU Michael A. Carroll Track & Soccer Stadium	10,524	(England) Max Rogers	
LA Galaxy II	Carson, California	Dignity Health Track Stadium	5,000	(United States) Junior Gonzalez	LA Galaxy
Las Vegas Lights FC	Las Vegas, Nevada	Cashman Field	9,334	(United States) Steve Cherundolo	Los Angeles FC
Loudoun United FC	Leesburg, Virginia	Segra Field	5,000	(United States) Ryan Martin	D.C. United
Louisville City FC	Louisville, Kentucky	Lynn Family Stadium	11,700	(United States) Danny Cruz	
Memphis 901 FC	Memphis, Tennessee	AutoZone Park	10,000	(United States) Ben Pirmann	
Miami FC	Miami, Florida	Riccardo Silva Stadium	25,000	(Scotland) Paul Dalglish	
New Mexico United	Albuquerque, New Mexico	Isotopes Park	13,500	(United States) Troy Lesesne	
New York Red Bulls II	Montclair, New Jersey	MSU Soccer Park at Pittser Field	5,000	(United States) John Wolyniec	New York Red Bulls
OKC Energy FC	Oklahoma City, Oklahoma	Taft Stadium	7,500	(England) Leigh Veidman	
Oakland Roots SC	Oakland, California	Laney College Football Stadium	5,500	(United States) Jordan Ferrell	
Orange County SC	Irvine, California	Champions Stadium	5,000	(England) Richard Chaplow (interim)	
Phoenix Rising FC	Chandler, Arizona	Phoenix Rising Soccer Complex at Wild Horse Pass	10,000	(United States) Rick Schantz	
Pittsburgh Riverhounds SC	Pittsburgh, Pennsylvania	Highmark Stadium	5,000	(United States) Bob Lilley	
Real Monarchs	Herriman, Utah	Zions Bank Stadium	5,000	(Colombia) Jámison Olave	Real Salt Lake
Rio Grande Valley FC Toros	Edinburg, Texas	H-E-B Park	9,400	(Colombia) Wilmer Cabrera	Houston Dynamo FC
Sacramento Republic FC	Sacramento, California	Heart Health Park	11,569	(England) Mark Briggs	
San Antonio FC	San Antonio, Texas	Toyota Field	8,296	(Canada) Alen Marcina	New York City FC
San Diego Loyal SC	San Diego, California	Torero Stadium	6,000	(United States) Landon Donovan	
Sporting Kansas City II	Kansas City, Kansas	Children's Mercy Park	18,467	(Brazil) Paulo Nagamura	Sporting Kansas City
Tacoma Defiance	Tacoma, Washington	Cheney Stadium	6,500	(United States) Wade Webber	Seattle Sounders FC
Tampa Bay Rowdies	St. Petersburg, Florida	Al Lang Stadium	7,227	(Scotland) Neill Collins	

MLS-affiliated
MLS-owned
1. Non-soccer specific stadium.
2. Opened in 2021;not to be confused with the former Weidner Field, now known as Switchbacks Training Stadium, where the team played from 2015 to 2020.

== Conference Tables ==
=== Eastern Conference ===
Pos	Div	Team	Pld	W	D	L	GF	GA	GD	Pts	Qualification
1	AT	Tampa Bay Rowdies	32	23	2	7	55	23	+32	71	Playoffs
2	CT	Louisville City FC	32	18	7	7	61	37	+24	61	Playoffs
3	CT	Birmingham Legion FC	32	18	6	8	51	31	+20	60	Playoffs
4	AT	Charlotte Independence	32	18	5	9	57	36	+21	59	Playoffs
5	AT	Pittsburgh Riverhounds SC	32	17	7	8	52	34	+18	58	Playoffs
6	AT	Miami FC	32	16	6	10	55	40	+15	54	Playoffs
7	CT	Memphis 901 FC	32	14	8	10	47	42	+5	50	Playoffs
8	CT	FC Tulsa	32	14	5	13	49	48	+1	47	Playoffs
9	AT	Hartford Athletic	32	12	5	15	50	50	0	41	
10	AT	Charleston Battery	32	10	7	15	49	60	−11	37	
11	CT	OKC Energy FC	32	8	13	11	30	38	−8	37	
12	CT	Indy Eleven	32	9	8	15	32	47	−15	35	
13	CT	Atlanta United 2	32	8	10	14	47	56	−9	34	
14	AT	New York Red Bulls II	32	7	7	18	42	67	−25	28	
15	CT	Sporting Kansas City II	32	4	8	20	33	64	−31	20	
16	AT	Loudoun United FC	32	4	3	25	31	78	−47	15	

Source: USL Championship
Rules for classification: 1) points; 2) head-to-head points; 3) head-to-head goal differential; 4) total points earned against in-division opponents; 5) total regular season wins against in-division opponents; 6) total goal differential against in-division opponents; 7) total goals scored against in-division opponents; 8) disciplinary points; 9) coin toss or drawing of lots.

=== Western Conference ===
Pos	Div	Team	Pld	W	D	L	GF	GA	GD	Pts	Qualification
1	PC	Phoenix Rising FC	32	20	7	5	68	35	+33	67	Playoffs
2	MT	El Paso Locomotive FC	32	18	10	4	56	34	+22	64	Playoffs
3	PC	Orange County SC	32	15	7	10	44	37	+7	52	Playoffs
4	MT	San Antonio FC	32	14	10	8	50	38	+12	52	Playoffs
5	MT	Colorado Springs Switchbacks FC	32	13	10	9	60	50	+10	49	Playoffs
6	PC	San Diego Loyal SC	32	14	6	12	51	43	+8	48	Playoffs
7	MT	Rio Grande Valley FC Toros	32	13	8	11	49	42	+7	47	Playoffs
8	MT	New Mexico United	32	12	10	10	44	40	+4	46	
9	MT	Austin Bold FC	32	10	12	10	32	42	−10	42	
10	PC	Oakland Roots SC	32	11	8	13	36	43	−7	41	Playoffs
11	PC	LA Galaxy II	32	11	6	15	55	57	−2	39	
12	PC	Tacoma Defiance	32	10	9	13	37	41	−4	39	
13	PC	Sacramento Republic FC	32	8	12	12	36	42	−6	36	
14	MT	Real Monarchs	32	5	7	20	28	56	−28	22	
15	PC	Las Vegas Lights FC	32	6	3	23	41	77	−36	21	

Source: USL Championship
Rules for classification: 1) points; 2) head-to-head points; 3) head-to-head goal differential; 4) total points earned against in-division opponents; 5) total regular season wins against in-division opponents; 6) total goal differential against in-division opponents; 7) total goals scored against in-division opponents; 8) disciplinary points; 9) coin toss or drawing of lots.

== Competition format ==
The COVID-19 pandemic has resulted in some changes from the most recent pre-COVID format involving two stand alone conferences. For this season, each of the conferences will be further split into two divisions, Atlantic and Central in the Eastern Conference and Mountain and Pacific in the Western Conference, creating four geographically based divisions of 8 (or 7) teams. The teams will play a 32-game schedule in a 27-week period starting around May 1. Individual teams can start their seasons between April 24 and May 15, based on crowd restrictions due to the COVID-19 pandemic. During the regular season, each team will play its division opponents four times – twice home, twice away, for a total of 28 (or in the Mountain Division, 24) games, making up the bulk of each team's season. The remaining games in each teams schedule will be played against regional or cross-conference opponents.

=== Managerial changes ===
Team	Outgoing manager	Manner of departure	Date of vacancy	Incoming manager	Date of appointment
Hartford Athletic	(Tunisia) Radhi Jaïdi	Mutual separation	October 20, 2020	(England) Harry Watling	January 13, 2021
Rio Grande Valley FC	(United States) Gerson Echeverry	Contract not renewed	November 6, 2020	(Colombia) Wilmer Cabrera	February 11, 2021
Colorado Springs Switchbacks	(South Africa) Alan Koch	Resigned	November 14, 2020	(United States) Brendan Burke	December 12, 2020
Tacoma Defiance	(Scotland) Chris Little	Resigned	February 26, 2021	(United States) Wade Webber	February 26, 2021
Las Vegas Lights FC	(Canada) Frank Yallop	Mutual separation	March 12, 2021	(United States) Steve Cherundolo	March 12, 2021
Atlanta United 2	(Scotland) Stephen Glass	Signed by Aberdeen	March 23, 2021	(England) Tony Annan (interim)	March 23, 2021
Oakland Roots SC	(United States) Dario Pot	Mutual separation	April 25, 2021	(United States) Jordan Ferrell (Note: Ferrell was initially appointed as interim head coach, but the move was made permanent on May 19, 2021.)	April 25, 2021
Louisville City FC	(United States) John Hackworth	Mutual separation	April 27, 2021	(United States) Danny Cruz (Note: Cruz was initially appointed as interim head coach, but the move was made permanent on October 11, 2021.)	April 27, 2021
Atlanta United 2	(England) Tony Annan (interim)	End of interim period	June 3, 2021	(Wales) Jack Collison	June 3, 2021
OKC Energy FC	(United States) John Pascarella	Mutual separation	June 4, 2021	(England) Leigh Veidman (Note: Veidman was initially appointed as interim head coach, but the move was made permanent on October 28, 2021.)	June 4, 2021
Indy Eleven	(Scotland) Martin Rennie	Mutual separation	June 16, 2021	(England) Max Rogers (interim)	June 19, 2021
Orange County SC	(United States) Braeden Cloutier	Sacked	August 19, 2021	(England) Richard Chaplow (Note: Chaplow was initially appointed as interim head coach, but the move was made permanent on November 9, 2021.)	August 19, 2021
Austin Bold FC	(Brazil) Marcelo Serrano	Promoted to Sporting Director	September 4, 2021	(Jamaica) Ryan Thompson	September 4, 2021

== Results table ==
Color key: Home • Away • Win • Loss • Draw
Club	Matches																															
Club	1	2	3	4	5	6	7	8	9	10	11	12	13	14	15	16	17	18	19	20	21	22	23	24	25	26	27	28	29	30	31	32
Atlanta United 2 (ATL)	LOU	OKC	OKC	TUL	MEM	BHM	LOU	SKC	MEM	OKC	MEM	IND	SKC	LOU	TUL	BHM	BHM	IND	OKC	SKC	PGH	TUL	IND	CHS	TBR	BHM	RGV	LOU	IND	SKC	MEM	TUL
Atlanta United 2 (ATL)	0–2	1–0	2–2	5–0	2–2	0–1	1–0	2–2	0–1	1–2	2–2	1–1	0–1	0–2	2–1	2–2	1–3	6–2	2–2	4–1	1–4	1–3	1–0	1–1	0–2	0–4	2–3	1–1	1–1	3–0 (Note: The USL awarded a 3–0 win to Atlanta United 2 after Sporting Kansas City II fielded Jake Davis who was an ineligible player. The original score was 1–0 for Sporting Kansas City II.)	2–4	0–4
Austin Bold FC (ATX)	NMU	SLC	SLC	ELP	PGH	NMU	RGV	COS	OAK	SAN	RGV	SLC	RGV	SAN	COS	ELP	MIA	RGV	NMU	COS	SAN	NMU	TUL	ELP	COS	TAC	OKC	BHM	SLC	ELP	SAN	CLT
Austin Bold FC (ATX)	1–3	1–1	2–0	0–1	1–0	0–0	2–1	2–3	0–0	1–0	1–1	1–0	1–1	0–3	2–1	0–3	0–0	1–1	1–1	1–4	2–1	1–0	1–0	2–2	1–3	1–0	1–1	1–3	3–4	0–3	0–0	1–1
Birmingham Legion FC (BHM)	IND	LOU	MEM	SAN	OKC	ATL	TUL	OKC	LOU	MIA	IND	MEM	IND	ATL	ATL	TUL	SKC	MEM	TUL	LOU	SKC	MEM	TUL	OKC	ATL	CLT	SKC	IND	ATX	OKC	SKC	LOU
Birmingham Legion FC (BHM)	0–1	1–1	1–0	1–2	1–0	1–0	2–1	2–1	0–2	1–0	1–0	0–1	2–1	2–2	3–1	1–3	4–2	1–1	1–2	2–1	1–0	2–3	1–1	1–1	4–0	2–1	1–0	3–1	3–1	0–0	6–0	0–1
Charleston Battery (CHS)	NYR	CLT	NYR	LDN	MIA	CLT	LDN	TBR	PGH	NMU	HFD	CLT	LDN	MIA	PGH	LDN	HFD	NYR	OCO	TBR	ATL	MIA	NYR	PGH	TBR	TBR	HFD	CLT	LAG	PGH	HFD	MIA
Charleston Battery (CHS)	1–1	0–3	2–2	1–0	2–1	0–3	3–0	0–1	1–1	1–2	3–1	2–0	5–3	2–3	2–3	1–0	1–2	3–2	0–0	0–1	1–1	1–1	2–3	3–3	1–2	2–4	4–3	1–5	3–1	1–2	0–2	0–4
Charlotte Independence (CLT)	TBR	CHS	PGH	MIA	TBR	HFD	NYR	CHS	MIA	PGH	NYR	PHX	CHS	TBR	LDN	NYR	PGH	COL	TBR	MIA	LDN	HFD	PGH	MIA	BHM	HFD	LDN	NYR	CHS	HFD	LDN	ATX
Charlotte Independence (CLT)	0–3	3–0	1–0	1–2	1–0	3–2	1–3	3–0	1–2	0–1	2–3	1–1	0–2	2–0	0–0	3–2	1–0	3–3	0–2	2–2	5–0	2–0	1–0	2–0	1–2	2–1	5–1	2–1	5–1	2–1	1–0	1–1
Colorado Springs Switchbacks FC (COS)	SAN	SKC	NMU	SAN	ELP	TAC	ATX	NMU	OCO	SLC	NMU	SAN	LOU	LDN	ATX	HFD	MEM	RGV	CLT	ATX	NMU	SLC	RGV	ELP	RGV	ATX	ELP	SLC	ELP	RGV	SLC	SAN
Colorado Springs Switchbacks FC (COS)	0–3	4–0	1–3	1–1	1–1	4–2	3–2	3–1	0–2	3–1	1–3	2–3	1–1	3–1	1–2	4–2	1–1	5–2	3–3	4–1	2–3	2–0	1–1	0–0	2–1	3–1	1–1	0–0	2–4	1–0	1–1	0–3
El Paso Locomotive (ELP)	NMU	RGV	SKC	ATX	IND	COS	SLC	RGV	NMU	SLC	LVL	NMU	SAN	SLC	SAN	ATX	NMU	RGV	SAN	OCO	SAC	COS	ATX	SLC	COS	SAN	TUL	COS	LAG	ATX	OKC	RGV
El Paso Locomotive (ELP)	1–1	1–0	0–0	1–0	2–0	1–1	2–1	2–3	2–1	3–1	1–0	0–0	2–1	3–1	2–0	3–0	1–1	3–1	1–2	2–2	2–0	0–0	2–2	1–0	1–1	3–3	2–1	4–2	0–5	3–0	4–0	1–4
Hartford Athletic (HFD)	NYR	MIA	PGH	NYR	CLT	LDN	TBR	LDN	NYR	TBR	CHS	MIA	PGH	MIA	COS	TBR	CHS	MIA	PGH	NYR	LOU	CLT	SLC	TBR	CLT	NMU	CHS	LDN	LDN	CLT	CHS	PGH
Hartford Athletic (HFD)	3–2	1–0	1–1	7–0	2–3	2–1	0–1	2–0	2–2	1–0	1–3	2–0	1–3	1–1	2–4	0–1	2–1	0–2	2–3	0–2	2–4	0–2	2–0	1–2	1–2	2–2	3–4	3–2	1–0	1–2	2–0	0–0
Indy Eleven (IND)	BHM	TUL	SKC	LOU	OKC	MEM	ELP	PGH	SKC	LOU	BHM	ATL	MEM	BHM	TUL	ATL	OKC	LDN	SKC	SLC	ATL	TUL	SKC	LOU	MEM	OKC	OKC	ATL	BHM	LOU	TUL	MEM
Indy Eleven (IND)	1–0	0–2	2–0	2–1	1–1	1–2	0–2	0–1	2–1	3–3	0–1	1–1	1–1	1–2	2–0	2–6	2–1	1–4	1–1	2–0	0–1	1–2	1–0	0–2	0–1	0–2	1–1	1–1	1–3	1–0	1–1	0–3
LA Galaxy II (LAG)	SAC	LVL	TAC	SLC	SKC	OAK	OCO	SDG	LVL	OCO	TAC	PHX	TAC	PHX	OAK	SDG	OCO	OAK	LVL	SAC	SDG	PHX	OAK	SAC	PHX	SDG	LVL	SAC	ELP	CHS	TAC	OCO
LA Galaxy II (LAG)	0–1	5–0	1–1	2–0	1–1	2–3	4–3	1–2	3–4	1–1	0–2	0–3	1–1	0–5	3–0	0–2	3–2	1–2	3–2	3–3	2–4	3–4	1–0	2–0	3–0	0–3	1–0	1–1	5–0	1–3	2–3	0–1
Las Vegas Lights (LVL)	LAG	SAC	PHX	SDG	TAC	SAN	LAG	OCO	SDG	TAC	OAK	SAC	ELP	SLC	OCO	PHX	SAC	SDG	OAK	LAG	TAC	SAC	OAK	OCO	PHX	SDG	OAK	LAG	TAC	PHX	OCO	TBR
Las Vegas Lights (LVL)	0–5	1–3	1–5	1–2	2–0	1–1	4–3	1–3	1–2	1–0	2–1	1–2	0–1	2–3	3–1	2–2	1–2	1–5	1–3	2–3	1–2	1–3	0–1	0–3	1–4	2–4	2–2	0–1	1–0	3–6	1–2	1–2
Loudoun United FC (LDN)	MIA	NYR	NMU	PGH	CHS	TBR	HFD	CHS	PGH	HFD	MIA	PGH	TBR	CHS	COS	CLT	CHS	IND	TBR	RGV	CLT	PGH	MIA	NYR	CLT	MIA	HFD	HFD	NYR	TBR	CLT	NYR
Loudoun United FC (LDN)	1–2	1–2	1–0	2–3	0–1	1–2	1–2	0–3	2–1	0–2	1–4	0–1	1–3	3–5	1–3	0–0	0–1	4–1	0–2	1–1	0–5	0–5	1–6	3–3	1–5	3–2	2–3	0–1	0–3	0–1	0–1	1–4
Louisville City FC (LOU)	ATL	BHM	SDG	IND	ATL	MEM	BHM	TUL	IND	SKC	TUL	OKC	ATL	COS	SKC	OKC	SKC	TUL	OKC	BHM	TUL	HFD	OKC	IND	MEM	ATL	NMU	SKC	MEM	IND	MEM	BHM
Louisville City FC (LOU)	2–0	1–1	2–1	1–2	0–1	3–0	2–0	3–2	3–3	4–2	2–3	3–1	2–0	1–1	2–1	2–1	4–1	2–1	0–0	1–2	0–1	4–2	1–1	2–0	1–1	1–1	3–1	4–3	1–2	0–1	3–1	1–0
Memphis 901 FC (MEM)	BHM	ATL	OKC	IND	LOU	ATL	OKC	SKC	ATL	BHM	IND	TUL	SKC	OKC	COS	BHM	TUL	SKC	OKC	BHM	MIA	NYR	IND	LOU	TUL	SKC	SAN	LOU	ATL	LOU	TUL	IND
Memphis 901 FC (MEM)	0–1	2–2	0–0	2–1	0–3	1–0	0–1	2–3	2–2	1–0	1–1	1–0	2–1	1–4	1–1	1–1	1–2	0–0	0–1	3–2	0–2	3–0	1–0	1–1	3–0	3–1	2–4	2–1	4–2	1–3	3–2	3–0
Miami FC (MIA)	LDN	HFD	NYR	TBR	CLT	RGV	PGH	CHS	BHM	CLT	NYR	TBR	LDN	TBR	HFD	CHS	HFD	PGH	ATX	HFD	NYR	CLT	MEM	CHS	CLT	LDN	PGH	LDN	TBR	NYR	PGH	CHS
Miami FC (MIA)	2–1	0–1	1–0	1–2	2–1	2–4	1–1	1–2	0–1	2–1	1–1	2–1	4–1	2–1	0–2	3–2	1–1	3–2	0–0	2–0	3–0	2–2	2–0	1–1	0–4	6–1	3–2	2–3	0–3	2–0	0–1 (Note: The USL decided to replay the October 16 match from the 67th minute after the referee wrongly disallowed a Pittsburgh Riverhounds SC goal. The original score was 0–0.)	4–0
New Mexico United (NMU)	RGV	ELP	ATX	COS	LDN	SLC	ATX	SAN	COS	SLC	ELP	COS	CHB	SAN	ELP	TAC	ELP	OAK	ATX	PHX	COS	ATX	SLC	SAN	RGV	LOU	HFD	RGV	SDG	SAN	RGV	SLC
New Mexico United (NMU)	0–1	1–1	3–1	3–1	0–1	1–0	0–0	2–0	1–3	2–3	1–2	3–1	2–1	0–3	0–0	0–0	1–1	1–1	1–1	2–3	3–2	0–1	2–1	1–0	2–0	1–3	2–2	1–1	1–1	4–2	0–2	3–1
New York Red Bulls II (NYR)	HFD	CHS	MIA	LDN	CHS	PGH	TBR	HFD	CLT	PGH	MIA	CLT	HFD	PGH	SAC	TBR	CLT	CHS	MIA	PGH	HFD	TBR	SAN	MEM	CHS	SLC	LDN	CLT	TBR	LDN	MIA	LDN
New York Red Bulls II (NYR)	2–3	1–1	0–1	2–1	2–2	0–3	0–1	0–7	3–1	1–2	1–1	3–2	2–2	1–3	1–3	1–2	2–3	2–3	0–3	0–1	2–0	0–6	1–2	0–3	3–2	0–0	3–3	1–2	1–1	3–0	0–2	4–1
Oakland Roots SC (OAK)	PHX	LAG	SAC	OCO	ATX	SDG	SAC	LVL	LAG	OCO	PHX	TAC	SAC	LAG	NMU	LVL	PHX	TAC	TBR	LVL	SDG	TAC	LAG	SDG	OCO	LVL	SAC	PHX	OCO	TAC	SDG	SKC
Oakland Roots SC (OAK)	0–3	3–2	3–3	0–1	0–0	0–1	0–0	1–2	0–3	0–3	0–1	1–3	0–0	2–1	1–1	3–1	3–1	3–1	0–3	1–0	0–0	3–1	0–1	2–1	1–2	2–2	2–1	0–1	0–1	0–0	4–3	1–0
OKC Energy (OKC)	TUL	ATL	SKC	ATL	BHM	MEM	IND	BHM	MEM	SKC	ATL	TUL	LOU	TUL	SKC	LOU	MEM	ATL	IND	LOU	RGV	MEM	SKC	LOU	BHM	IND	IND	SAN	ATX	BHM	ELP	TUL
OKC Energy (OKC)	1–3	0–1	1–1	2–2	0–1	0–0	1–1	1–2	1–0	1–0	2–1	0–0	1–3	2–1	0–0	1–2	4–1	2–2	1–2	0–0	2–1	1–0	0–3	1–1	1–1	2–0	1–1	0–1	1–1	0–0	0–4	0–2
Orange County SC (OCO)	TAC	SAC	LAG	SAC	SDG	OAK	LVL	LAG	COS	TAC	SAC	SDG	RGV	SAC	LVL	OAK	LAG	PHX	TAC	SDG	CHS	ELP	LVL	PHX	OAK	PHX	TAC	PHX	OAK	SDG	LVL	LAG
Orange County SC (OCO)	0–1	1–0	3–4	3–1	1–1	1–0	3–1	1–1	2–0	0–0	2–0	1–2	0–2	2–2	1–3	3–0	2–3	1–1	0–3	2–1	0–0	2–2	3–0	1–2	2–1	0–1	1–4	1–0	1–0	1–0	2–1	1–0
Phoenix Rising FC (PHX)	SDG	OAK	TBR	LVL	SAC	SDG	TAC	SDG	SAC	LAG	CLT	LAG	SDG	RGV	OAK	LVL	OCO	SAC	OAK	NMU	TAC	LAG	LVL	OCO	TAC	LAG	OCO	OAK	OCO	LVL	SAC	TAC
Phoenix Rising FC (PHX)	4–1	3–0	1–2	5–1	1–0	2–2	3–0	1–2	3–1	3–0	1–1	5–0	1–0	3–1	1–0	2–2	1–1	0–0	1–3	3–2	3–1	4–3	4–1	2–1	2–1	0–3	1–0	1–0	0–1	6–3	1–1	1–1
Pittsburgh Riverhounds SC (PGH)	TBR	HFD	CLT	NYR	LDN	ATX	MIA	IND	TBR	NYR	LDN	CLT	CHS	LDN	NYR	HFD	CHS	MIA	CLT	TBR	ATL	HFD	NYR	SAN	LDN	CLT	CHS	MIA	TBR	CHS	MIA	HFD
Pittsburgh Riverhounds SC (PGH)	0–3	1–1	0–1	3–0	3–2	0–1	1–1	1–0	2–1	2–1	1–2	1–0	1–1	1–0	3–1	3–1	3–2	2–3	0–1	0–0	4–1	3–2	1–0	1–1	5–0	0–1	3–3	2–3	2–0	2–1	1–0	0–0
Real Monarchs (SLC)	SAN	LAG	ATX	ATX	NMU	SAC	RGV	ELP	TAC	SAN	NMU	COS	ELP	ATX	LVL	ELP	RGV	SDG	IND	SAN	COS	SAN	HFD	NMU	NYR	ELP	RGV	COS	ATX	COL	RGV	NMU
Real Monarchs (SLC)	2–2	0–2	1–1	0–2	0–1	2–0	0–1	1–2	1–1	1–1	3–2	1–3	1–3	0–1	3–2	1–3	0–3	1–0	0–2	2–3	0–2	0–1	0–2	1–2	0–0	0–1	0–3	0–0	4–3	1–1	1–3	1–3
Rio Grande Valley FC Toros (RGV)	NMU	SDG	SAN	ELP	SAN	MIA	SLC	ATX	SAN	TUL	ELP	ATX	OCO	ATX	PHX	SLC	SAN	COS	ATX	ELP	OKC	LDN	COS	COS	ATL	NMU	SLC	NMU	COS	NMU	SLC	ELP
Rio Grande Valley FC Toros (RGV)	1–0	1–0	2–1	0–1	1–1	4–2	1–0	1–2	1–1	1–2	3–2	1–1	2–0	1–1	1–3	3–0	1–2	2–5	1–1	1–3	1–2	1–1	1–1	1–2	3–2	0–2	3–0	1–1	0–1	2–0	3–1	4–1
Sacramento Republic FC (SAC)	LAG	LVL	OCO	PHX	OAK	OCO	SLC	PHX	SDG	OAK	OCO	LVL	OCO	NYR	TAC	OAK	LVL	PHX	SDG	LAG	LVL	ELP	SAN	TAC	LAG	TAC	OAK	SDG	LAG	TAC	PHX	SDG
Sacramento Republic FC (SAC)	1–0	3–1	0–1	0–1	3–3	1–3	0–2	1–3	1–1	0–0	0–2	2–1	2–2	3–1	1–1	0–0	2–1	0–0	1–3	3–3	3–1	0–2	0–1	1–0	0–2	3–1	1–2	1–2	1–1	0–0	1–1	1–1
San Antonio FC (SAN)	COS	SLC	RGV	BHM	RGV	COS	LVL	NMU	RGV	SLC	ATX	COS	NMU	ELP	ATX	ELP	RGV	ELP	SLC	PGH	ATX	SLC	NYR	SAC	NMU	OKC	ELP	MEM	TUL	NMU	ATX	COS
San Antonio FC (SAN)	3–0	2–2	1–2	2–1	1–1	1–1	1–1	0–2	1–1	1–1	0–1	3–2	3–0	1–2	3–0	0–2	2–1	2–1	3–2	1–1	1–2	1–0	2–1	1–0	0–1	1–0	3–3	4–2	1–1	2–4	0–0	3–0
San Diego Loyal SC (SDG)	PHX	RGV	TAC	LOU	LVL	PHX	OCO	LAG	PHX	LVL	OAK	SAC	OCO	PHX	TAC	LAG	SLC	TAC	LVL	OCO	SAC	LAG	OAK	TAC	OAK	LVL	LAG	SAC	NMU	OCO	OAK	SAC
San Diego Loyal SC (SDG)	1–4	0–1	1–3	1–2	2–1	2–2	1–1	2–1	2–1	2–1	1–0	1–1	2–1	0–1	1–2	2–0	0–1	1–2	5–1	1–2	3–1	4–2	0–0	1–0	1–2	4–2	3–0	2–1	1–1	0–1	3–4	1–1
Sporting Kansas City II (SKC)	TUL	OKC	COS	LAG	IND	ELP	TUL	ATL	TUL	IND	OKC	MEM	LOU	ATL	OKC	LOU	MEM	LOU	BHM	ATL	IND	MEM	BHM	OKC	IND	TUL	BHM	MEM	LOU	ATL	BHM	OAK
Sporting Kansas City II (SKC)	0–2	1–1	0–4	1–1	0–2	0–0	4–1	2–2	3–4	1–2	0–1	3–2	2–4	1–0	0–0	1–2	1–2	1–4	2–4	1–4	1–1	0–0	0–1	3–0	0–1	1–1	0–1	1–3	3–4	0–3	0–6	0–1
Tacoma Defiance (TAC)	LAG	SDG	OCO	LVL	PHX	COS	SLC	LAG	LVL	OCO	LAG	SDG	NMU	SAC	OAK	SDG	OCO	OAK	LVL	PHX	OAK	SDG	SAC	PHX	SAC	ATX	OCO	LVL	SAC	OAK	LAG	PHX
Tacoma Defiance (TAC)	1–1	3–1	1–0	0–2	0–3	2–4	1–1	2–0	0–1	0–0	1–1	2–1	0–0	1–1	3–1	2–1	3–0	1–3	2–1	1–3	1–3	0–1	0–1	1–2	1–3	0–1	4–1	0–1	0–0	0–0	3–2	1–1
Tampa Bay Rowdies (TBR)	CLT	PGH	PHX	MIA	NYR	CLT	LDN	PGH	HFD	CHS	MIA	HFD	MIA	LDN	CLT	NYR	HFD	PGH	LDN	CLT	OAK	CHS	NYR	ATL	HFD	CHS	CHS	PGH	NYR	MIA	LDN	LVL
Tampa Bay Rowdies (TBR)	3–0	3–0	2–1	2–1	1–0	0–1	2–1	1–2	1–0	1–0	1–2	0–1	1–2	3–1	0–2	2–1	1–0	0–0	2–0	2-0	3–0	1–0	6–0	2–0	2–1	2–1	4–2	0–2	1–1	3–0	1–0	2–1
FC Tulsa (TUL)	OKC	SKC	IND	ATL	SKC	BHM	SKC	LOU	RGV	OKC	LOU	OKC	MEM	ATL	IND	BHM	LOU	BHM	MEM	ATL	LOU	IND	BHM	ATX	SKC	MEM	ELP	SAN	ATL	IND	MEM	OKC
FC Tulsa (TUL)	3–1	2–0	2–0	0–5	1–4	1–2	4–3	2–3	2–1	0–0	3–2	1–2	0–1	1–2	0–2	3–1	1–2	2–1	2–1	2–0	1–0	2–1	1–1	0–1	1–1	0–3	1–2	1–1	4–0	1–1	2–3	2–0

== Playoffs ==
=== Bracket ===
Conference Quarterfinals; November 5–7	Conference Semifinals; November 13
A1	Tampa Bay Rowdies	6
C4	FC Tulsa	2
A1	Tampa Bay Rowdies	1
C2	Birmingham Legion FC	0
C2	Birmingham Legion FC	w/o
A3	Pittsburgh Riverhounds SC
Eastern Conference
A2	Charlotte Independence	3
C3	Memphis 901 FC	1
A2	Charlotte Independence	0
C1	Louisville City FC	1
C1	Louisville City FC	1
A4	Miami FC	0
M1	El Paso Locomotive FC	0
P4	Oakland Roots SC	1
P4	Oakland Roots SC	0 (5)
P2	Orange County SC (p)	0 (6)
P2	Orange County SC	1
M3	Colorado Springs Switchbacks FC	0
Western Conference
M2	San Antonio FC	2
P3	San Diego Loyal SC	0
M2	San Antonio FC	3
M4	Rio Grande Valley FC Toros	1
P1	Phoenix Rising FC	3 (3)
M4	Rio Grande Valley FC Toros (p)	3 (4)

Conference Finals; November 20
A1	Tampa Bay Rowdies (a.e.t.)	3
C1	Louisville City FC	2
P2	Orange County SC (p)	1 (5)
M2	San Antonio FC	1 (3)

USL Championship Final; November 28
A1	Tampa Bay Rowdies	1
P2	Orange County SC	3

=== Conference quarter-finals ===
November 6, 2021 East	Charlotte Independence	3–1	Memphis 901 FC	Charlotte, North Carolina
7:00 PM EDT	Johnson 10'; Fuchs 32'; Bronico (yellow card) 35'; Marveaux 72'	Report	Kissiedou (yellow card) 39'; Murphy 83'; Segbers (yellow card) 89'; Carroll (yellow card) 90+3'	Stadium: American Legion Memorial Stadium; Attendance: 2,723; Referee: Mark Allatin

November 6, 2021 East	Tampa Bay Rowdies	6–2	FC Tulsa	St. Petersburg, Florida
7:30 PM EDT	Guenzatti 21'; Guillén (yellow card) 45+2'; Benton 46' (o.g.); Dos Santos 56' (yellow card) 79'; Fernandes 89', 90+5'; Mkosana 90+2'	Report	Bird (yellow card) 63' (yellow-red card) 72'; Rivas 67'; Suárez 90'	Stadium: Al Lang Stadium; Attendance: 6,262; Referee: Sergii Demianchuk

November 6, 2021 East	Louisville City FC	1–0	Miami FC	Louisville, Kentucky
8:00 PM EDT	Gonzalez 74'; Lancaster (yellow card) 87'; Greig (yellow card) 89'	Report	Craig (yellow card) 24'; Da Silva (yellow card) 72'	Stadium: Lynn Family Stadium; Attendance: 9,097; Referee: Elton García

November 7, 2021 East	Birmingham Legion FC	w/o	Pittsburgh Riverhounds SC	Birmingham, Alabama
5:00 PM EST		Report		Stadium: BBVA Field
Note: Match canceled after multiple Pittsburgh Riverhounds SC players tested positive for COVID-19.

November 5, 2021 West	San Antonio FC	2–0	San Diego Loyal SC	San Antonio, Texas
8:00 PM CDT	Giro (yellow card) 6'; Nathan 14'; Patiño 25'; Epps (yellow card) 46'; Maloney (yellow card) 60'	Report	Stoneman (yellow card) 16'; Martin (yellow card) 81'; Martin (yellow card) 86'	Stadium: Toyota Field; Attendance: 7,003; Referee: Matthew Thompson

November 5, 2021 West	El Paso Locomotive FC	0–1	Oakland Roots SC	El Paso, Texas
7:30 PM MDT	Fox (yellow card) 20'; Luna (yellow card) 78'	Report	Nane (yellow card) 26'; Bokila 76'; Morad (yellow card) 90+3'	Stadium: Southwest University Park; Attendance: 7,201; Referee: Ismir Pekmic

November 6, 2021 West	Orange County SC	1–0	Colorado Springs Switchbacks FC	Irvine, California
7:00 PM PDT	Kuningas (yellow card) 20'; Kiernan (red card) 31'; Damus 45+1'; Orozco (yellow card) 50'; Romero (yellow card) 90+6'	Report	Ockford (yellow card) 27'; Beckford (yellow card) 66'; Hodge (yellow card) 86'	Stadium: Championship Soccer Stadium; Attendance: 4,194; Referee: Lukasz Szpala

November 6, 2021 West	Phoenix Rising FC	3–3 (a.e.t.) (3–4 p)	Rio Grande Valley FC Toros	Chandler, Arizona
7:30 PM MST	Asante 23', 101'; Rodríguez (yellow card) 39' (goal) 54'; Asante (yellow card) 73'; Moar (yellow card) 120+1'	Report	Njie 19' (yellow card) 22'; Cabezas (yellow card) 37'; Pimentel (yellow card) 66'; López 71' (yellow card) 72'; Amoh 109' (pen.)	Stadium: Wild Horse Pass; Attendance: 8,234; Referee: Brandon Stevis
	Penalties
	Bakero (penalty scored); Rodríguez (penalty missed); Quinn (penalty missed); Farrell (penalty scored); Moar (penalty scored)		(penalty scored) Njie; (penalty scored) Ycaza; (penalty scored) Pimentel; (penalty missed) López; (penalty scored) Amoh

=== Conference semi-finals ===
November 13, 2021 East	Tampa Bay Rowdies	1–0	Birmingham Legion FC	St. Petersburg, Florida
7:00 pm EST	Ekra 57'; Scarlett (yellow card) 90+4'	Report	Crognale (yellow card) 38'; Kasim (yellow card) 46'; Crognale (yellow card) 89'; Williams (yellow card) 90+3'	Stadium: Al Lang Stadium; Attendance: 5,949; Referee: Elton García

November 13, 2021 East	Louisville City FC	1–0	Charlotte Independence	Louisville, Kentucky
7:30 pm EST	DelPiccolo (yellow card) 5'; Ownby (yellow card) 21'; McCabe (yellow card) 44'; Lancaster 89' (pen.)	Report	Kelly (yellow card) 34'; Parra (yellow card) 44'; Roascos (yellow card) 76'; Martínez (yellow card) 87'; Pack (yellow card) 87'; Fuchs (yellow card) 90+2'; Johnson (yellow card) 90+6'	Stadium: Lynn Family Stadium; Attendance: 9,155; Referee: Elijio Arreguin

November 13, 2021 West	Orange County SC	0–0 (a.e.t.) (6–5 p)	Oakland Roots SC	Irvine, California
7:00 pm PST		Report	Ward (yellow card) 97'	Stadium: Championship Soccer Stadium; Attendance: 5,218; Referee: Matthew Thompson
	Penalties
	Kuningas (penalty scored); Powers (penalty scored); Casiple (penalty scored); Enevoldsen (penalty scored); Okoli (penalty scored); Damus (penalty scored)		(penalty scored) Morad; (penalty scored) Bokila; (penalty scored) Mbumba; (penalty scored) Nane; (penalty scored) Harish; (penalty missed) Ward

November 13, 2021 West	San Antonio FC	3–1	Rio Grande Valley FC Toros	San Antonio, Texas
8:00 PM CST	Patiño 24', 55'; Nathan 61'; Giro (yellow card) 73'; Farr (yellow card) 84'	Report	Cabezas (yellow card) 43'; Edwards (yellow card) 45+1'; Azócar (yellow card) 64'; Amoh 69' (pen.)	Stadium: Toyota Field; Attendance: 7,966; Referee: Mark Allatin

=== Conference finals ===
November 20, 2021 East	Tampa Bay Rowdies	3–2 (a.e.t.)	Louisville City FC	St. Petersburg, Florida
7:00 pm EST	Tejada (yellow card) 43'; Dos Santos (yellow card) 73' (goal) 102'; Wyke (yellow card) 83'; Guillén (yellow card) 98'; Mkosana 83', 90+6'	Report	Ownby (yellow card) 5' (goal) 10'; Lasso 23' (o.g.); Gómez (yellow card) 55'; Jimenez (yellow card) 100'	Stadium: Al Lang Stadium; Attendance: 7,120; Referee: Lukasz Szpala

November 20, 2021 West	Orange County SC	1–1 (a.e.t.) (5–3 p)	San Antonio FC	Irvine, California
7:00 pm PST	Damus (yellow card) 6' (goal) 39'; Alston (yellow card) 60'	Report	Fogaça (yellow card) 64'; Epps 67'; Giro (yellow card) 88'; Taintor (yellow card) 105+3'	Stadium: Championship Soccer Stadium; Attendance: 5,386; Referee: Elton García
	Penalties
	Casiple (penalty scored); Powers (penalty scored); Mines (penalty scored); Enevoldsen (penalty scored); Okoli (penalty scored)		(penalty scored) Maloney; (penalty scored) Patiño; (penalty scored) Khmiri; (penalty missed) Dhillon

=== USL Championship Final ===
November 28, 2021	Tampa Bay Rowdies	1–3	Orange County SC	St. Petersburg, Florida
8:30 PM EST	Lasso (yellow card) 16'; Fernandes 57'	Report	Damus 25', 38'; Kuningas 45'; Mines (yellow card) 90+2'	Stadium: Al Lang Stadium; Attendance: 7,521; Referee: Rubiel Vazquez

Championship Game MVP: (Haiti) Ronaldo Damus (Orange County SC)

== Average home attendances ==
Ranked from highest to lowest average attendance.

Team	GP	Total	High	Low	Average
Louisville City FC	16	161,406	12,115	7,652	10,088
New Mexico United	16	125,627	10,418	5,377	7,852
Sacramento Republic FC	16	117,486	9,983	2,313	7,343
Phoenix Rising FC	16	111,941	9,236	4,995	6,996
Colorado Springs Switchbacks FC	16	100,335	8,023	4,792	6,271
El Paso Locomotive FC	16^{1}	92,110	8,138	4,688	6,141
Indy Eleven	16	90,484	7,999	1,999	5,655
Las Vegas Lights FC	16^{6}	55,204	7,298	2,219	5,520
Birmingham Legion FC	16^{6}	54,344	11,105	2,363	5,434
San Antonio FC	16	77,311	6,516	3,735	4,832
Hartford Athletic	16	73,702	5,500	2,750	4,606
Memphis 901 FC	16	65,202	5,425	3,029	4,075
San Diego Loyal SC	16^{1}	59,295	6,000	2,000	3,953
Oakland Roots SC	16^{5}	41,707	5,508	813	3,792
Tampa Bay Rowdies	16	60,052	6,882	1,870	3,753
Orange County SC	16	56,592	5,740	2,042	3,537
FC Tulsa	16	55,616	5,009	2,302	3,476
Pittsburgh Riverhounds SC	16^{1}	46,988	3,115	2,003	3,133
Rio Grande Valley FC Toros	16	48,475	4,440	2,195	3,030
Charleston Battery	16^{1}	41,136	3,738	2,024	2,742
OKC Energy FC	16	36,168	3,677	1,579	2,261
Charlotte Independence	16	32,147	4,231	533	2,009
Real Monarchs	16	20,017	1,818	763	1,251
Tacoma Defiance	16	17,890	1,993	811	1,118
Austin Bold FC	16	15,036	1,577	531	940
Atlanta United 2	16	11,944	1,421	612	747
Miami FC	16^{9}	6,293	1,083	418	699
Loudoun United FC	16^{2}	9,213	1,126	310	658
New York Red Bulls II	16	8,496	803	369	531
LA Galaxy II	16	0	0	0	0
Sporting Kansas City II	16	0	0	0	0
Total	496	1,654,553	12,115	310 or 246	3,336 or 4,138

^{1} One result missing/Played behind closed doors
^{2} Two results missing/Played behind closed doors
^{5} Five results missing/Played behind closed doors
^{6} Six results missing/Played behind closed doors
^{9} Nine results missing/Played behind closed doors
Updated to games of June 18, 2021.
Note: Stadium capacities are reduced to promote social distancing due to the COVID-19 pandemic.

^{*Statistic may be incorrect due to no official attendance being released by neither the league nor club for one or more game(s); average attendances do not include the unreported matches.}

== Regular season statistical leaders ==
=== Top scorers ===
Rank	Player	Club	Goals
1	(Guinea) Hadji Barry	Colorado Springs Switchbacks FC	25
2	(Uruguay) Sebastián Guenzatti	Tampa Bay Rowdies	21
3	(England) Cameron Lancaster	Louisville City FC	20
3	(United States) Kyle Murphy	Memphis 901 FC	20
5	(Jamaica) Neco Brett	Birmingham Legion FC	18
6	(United States) Preston Judd	LA Galaxy II	17
7	(United States) Russell Cicerone	Pittsburgh Riverhounds SC	16
7	(Spain) Santi Moar	Phoenix Rising FC	16
9	(Haiti) Ronaldo Damus	Orange County SC	14
9	(United States) Chris Wehan	Orange County SC	14

=== Hat-tricks ===
Player	Club	Against	Result	Date
(Colombia) Santiago Patiño	San Antonio FC	Colorado Springs Switchbacks FC	3–0 (H)	May 1, 2021
(Ghana) Elvis Amoh	Rio Grande Valley FC Toros	Miami FC	4–2 (A)	June 6, 2021
(United States) Preston Judd	LA Galaxy II	Las Vegas Lights FC	3–4 (H)	June 16, 2021
(United States) Tyler Wolff	Atlanta United 2	Indy Eleven	6–2 (H)	August 8, 2021
(United States) Russell Cicerone	Pittsburgh Riverhounds SC	Atlanta United 2	4–1 (H)	August 22, 2021
(United States) Samuel Adeniran	Tacoma Defiance	Orange County SC	4–1 (H)	October 9, 2021
(United States) Cal Jennings	Las Vegas Lights FC	Phoenix Rising FC	3–6 (H)	October 16, 2021
(England) Cameron Lancaster	Louisville City FC	Memphis 901 FC	3–1 (H)	October 23, 2021

Notes

(H) – Home team
(A) – Away team

=== Top assists ===
Rank	Player	Club	Assists
1	(United States) Danny Barrera	Hartford Athletic	12
2	(United States) Brian Ownby	Louisville City FC	11
2	(United States) Aodhan Quinn	Phoenix Rising FC	11
4	(Bermuda) Zeiko Lewis	Charleston Battery	10
5	(United States) Alex Dixon	Pittsburgh Riverhounds SC	9
5	(United States) Josh Drack	LA Galaxy II	9
7	(United States) Russell Cicerone	Pittsburgh Riverhounds SC	8
7	(United States) Kadeem Dacres	Memphis 901 FC	8
7	(United States) Jonathan Gómez	Louisville City FC	8
7	(Democratic Republic of the Congo) Michee Ngalina	Colorado Springs Switchbacks FC	8

=== Clean sheets ===
Rank	Player	Club	Clean sheets
1	(United States) Evan Louro	Tampa Bay Rowdies	14
2	(United States) Elliot Panicco	Austin Bold FC	11
3	(United States) Danny Vitiello	Pittsburgh Riverhounds SC	9
3	(United States) Jeff Caldwell	Hartford Athletic	9
3	(United States) C. J. Cochran	OKC Energy FC	9
3	(United States) Logan Ketterer	El Paso Locomotive FC	9
3	(Germany) Patrick Rakovsky	Orange County SC	9
3	(United States) Matt Van Oekel	Birmingham Legion FC	9
9	(United States) Justin Vom Steeg	LA Galaxy II	8
10	(United States) Matt Cardone	San Antonio FC	7
10	(Greece) Alexandros Tabakis	New Mexico United	7

== League awards ==
=== Individual awards ===
Award	Winner	Team	Reason	Ref.
Golden Boot	(Guinea) Hadji Barry	Colorado Springs Switchbacks FC	25 goals; ties league record	
Golden Glove	(United States) Evan Louro	Tampa Bay Rowdies	14 shutouts; 0.74 goals against average	
Assists Champion	(United States) Danny Barrera	Hartford Athletic	12 assists	
Goalkeeper of the Year	(United States) Evan Louro	Tampa Bay Rowdies	14 shutouts; 58 saves	
Defender of the Year	(United States) Forrest Lasso	Tampa Bay Rowdies	154 clearances; 132 aerial duels, 26 blocked shots	
Coach of the Year	(Scotland) Neill Collins	Tampa Bay Rowdies	Regular season champions with 23 wins	
Young Player of the Year	(United States) Jonathan Gomez	Louisville City FC	2 goals; 8 assists; 39 interceptions	
Most Valuable Player	(Guinea) Hadji Barry	Colorado Springs Switchbacks FC	25 goals; 5 assists; 30.5 shot conversion rate	
Goal of the Year	(United States) Austin Yearwood	New Mexico United	vs San Antonio FC	
Save of the Year	(United States) Joe Kuzminsky	Charleston Battery	vs Tampa Bay Rowdies	

=== All-league teams ===
First team
Goalkeeper	Defenders	Midfielders	Forwards
(United States) Evan Louro (TBR)	(England) Paco Craig (MIA) (United States) Jonathan Gómez (LOU) (United States) Forrest Lasso (TBR) (United States) Sean Totsch (LOU)	(United States) Danny Barrera (HAR) (Mexico) Jorge Hernandez (LAG) (United States) Aodhan Quinn (PHX)	(Guinea) Hadji Barry (COS) (Uruguay) Sebastian Guenzatti (TBR) (Spain) Santi Moar (PHX)

Second team
Goalkeeper	Defenders	Midfielders	Forwards
(United States) Matt Van Oekel (BHM)	(Mexico) Aarón Guillén (TBR) (New Zealand) James Musa (PHX) (United States) Mark Segbers (MEM) (Ghana) Joshua Yaro (SDG)	(United States) Jose Gallegos (SAN) (Jamaica) Kenardo Forbes (PGH) (United States) Diego Luna (ELP)	(Jamaica) Neco Brett (BHM) (England) Cameron Lancaster (LOU) (United States) Kyle Murphy (MEM)

=== Monthly awards ===
Month	Player of the Month			Goal of the Month			Save of the Month		Coach of the Month		References
Month	Player	Club	Position	Player	Club	Position	Player	Club	Coach	Club	References
April / May	(Spain) Santi Moar	Phoenix Rising FC	Forward	(England) Daniel Bruce	New Mexico United	Midfielder	(United States) Matt Cardone	San Antonio FC	(Scotland) Neill Collins	Tampa Bay Rowdies	
June	(Guinea) Hadji Barry	Colorado Springs Switchbacks FC	Forward	(United States) Austin Yearwood	New Mexico United	Defender	(United States) Matt Van Oekel	Birmingham Legion FC	(United States) Landon Donovan	San Diego Loyal SC	
July	(United States) Kyle Murphy	Memphis 901 FC	Forward	(Japan) Hiroki Kurimoto	OKC Energy FC	Midfielder	(Greece) Alex Tambakis	New Mexico United	(England) Mark Lowry	El Paso Locomotive FC	
August	(Guinea) Hadji Barry	Colorado Springs Switchbacks FC	Forward	(Canada) Aidan Daniels	OKC Energy FC	Forward	(Germany) Patrick Rakovsky	Orange County SC	(Scotland) Paul Dalglish	Miami FC	
September	(Uruguay) Sebastian Guenzatti	Tampa Bay Rowdies	Forward	(United States) Julian Chavez	Sacramento Republic FC	Forward	(United States) Joe Kuzminsky	Charleston Battery	(Scotland) Neill Collins	Tampa Bay Rowdies	
October	(United States) Kyle Murphy	Memphis 901 FC	Forward	(United States) Luis Felipe Fernandes	Sacramento Republic FC	Midfielder	(United States) Joe Kuzminsky	Charleston Battery	(United States) Mike Jeffries	Charlotte Independence	

=== Weekly awards ===
Player of the Week
Week	Player	Club	Position	Reason	Ref.
1	(United States) Paolo DelPiccolo	Louisville City FC	Midfielder	Scored brace vs Atlanta United 2	
2	(Colombia) Santiago Patiño	San Antonio FC	Forward	Scored a hat-trick vs Colorado Springs Switchbacks FC	
3	(El Salvador) Joaquin Rivas	FC Tulsa	Forward	Scored brace vs Indy Eleven	
4	(United States) Matt Van Oekel	Birmingham Legion FC	Goalkeeper	Made a five-save shutout and one assist	
5	(United States) Aiden McFadden	Atlanta United 2	Midfielder	Scored four goals in two games	
6	(Brazil) Bruno Lapa	Birmingham Legion FC	Midfielder	Scored game-winning goals in two consecutive matches	
7	(Ghana) Elvis Amoh	Rio Grande Valley FC	Forward	Scored a hat-trick vs Miami FC	
8	(United States) Alejandro Guido	San Diego Loyal SC	Midfielder	Created one goal and one assist from the bench vs LA Galaxy II	
9	(England) Cameron Lancaster	Louisville City FC	Forward	Scored three goals in two games	
10	(Guinea) Hadji Barry	Colorado Springs Switchbacks FC	Forward	Scored four goals in two games	
11	(United States) Dylan Mares	El Paso Locomotive FC	Forward	Created two goals and one assist in two games	
12	(United States) Kyle Morton	Memphis 901 FC	Goalkeeper	Eight save shutout vs Birmingham Legion FC	
13	(Ghana) Solomon Asante	Phoenix Rising FC	Forward	Created one goal and three assists vs LA Galaxy II	
14	(United States) Joe Kuzminsky	Charleston Battery	Goalkeeper	Penalty-kick save and an assist vs Charlotte Independence	
15	(Argentina) Luis Solignac	El Paso Locomotive FC	Forward	Three goals in two games	
16	(United States) Tyler Wolff	Atlanta United 2	Forward	Scored a hat-trick vs Indy Eleven	
17	(Jamaica) Speedy Williams	Miami FC	Midfielder	Scored two goals vs Pittsburgh Riverhounds SC	
18	(United States) Russell Cicerone	Pittsburgh Riverhounds SC	Forward	Scored a hat-trick vs Atlanta United 2	
19	(United States) Evan Louro	Tampa Bay Rowdies	Goalkeeper	Back-to-back shutouts	
20	(United States) Corey Hertzog	San Diego Loyal SC	Forward	Two goals vs LA Galaxy II	
21	(France) Yann Ekra	Tampa Bay Rowdies	Midfielder	Two goals & two assists vs Red Bulls II	
22	(Uruguay) Sebastian Guenzatti	Tampa Bay Rowdies	Forward	Two goals in two games	
23	(Jamaica) Neco Brett	Birmingham Legion FC	Forward	Three goals and one assist in two games	
24	(Ivory Coast) Laurent Kissiedou	Memphis 901 FC	Midfielder	Two goals vs FC Tulsa	
25	(United States) Samuel Adeniran	Tacoma Defiance	Forward	Scored a hat-trick vs Orange County SC	
26	(Jamaica) Dane Kelly	Charlotte Independence	Forward	Two goals vs Charleston Battery	
27	(England) Cameron Lancaster	Louisville City FC	Forward	Scored a hat-trick vs Memphis 901 FC	
28	(Saint Vincent and the Grenadines) Kyle Edwards	Rio Grande Valley FC	Forward	Two goals vs El Paso Locomotive FC	

Goal of the Week
Week	Player	Club	Opponent	Ref.
1 & 2	(El Salvador) Joaquín Rivas	FC Tulsa	OKC Energy FC	
3	(Spain) Santi Moar	Phoenix Rising FC	Oakland Roots SC	
4	(El Salvador) Amando Moreno	New Mexico United	Austin Bold FC	
5	(England) Daniel Bruce	New Mexico United	Colorado Springs Switchbacks FC	
6	(Venezuela) Juan Carlos Azócar	Rio Grande Valley FC	San Antonio FC	
7	(United States) Conor McGlynn	Hartford Athletic	New York Red Bulls II	
8	(United States) Alejandro Guido	San Diego Loyal SC	LA Galaxy II	
9	(United States) Austin Yearwood	New Mexico United	Austin Bold FC	
10	(Ghana) Solomon Asante	Phoenix Rising FC	Sacramento Republic FC	
11	(United States) Brian Ownby	Louisville City FC	Sporting Kansas City II	
12	(Uganda) Micheal Azira	New Mexico United	Colorado Springs Switchbacks FC	
13	(United States) Jimmy McLaughlin	Louisville City FC	Atlanta United 2	
14	(Kenya) Nabilai Kibunguchy	Sacramento Republic FC	Orange County SC	
15	(United States) Luis Felipe Fernandes	Sacramento Republic FC	New York Red Bulls II	
16	(Canada) Aidan Daniels	OKC Energy FC	Memphis 901 FC	
17	(United States) Max Ornstil	Oakland Roots SC	LA Galaxy II	
18	(Argentina) Luis Solignac	El Paso Locomotive FC	Rio Grande Valley FC	
19	(United States) Darnell King	Phoenix Rising FC	Oakland Roots SC	
20	(United States) Julian Chavez	Sacramento Republic FC	Las Vegas Lights FC	
21	(United States) Jose Francisco Torres	Colorado Springs Switchbacks FC	Real Monarchs	
22	(El Salvador) Amando Moreno	New Mexico United	Real Monarchs	
23	(United States) Johnny Rodriguez	Oakland Roots SC	San Diego Loyal SC	
24	(United States) Luis Felipe Fernandes	Sacramento Republic FC	Tacoma Defiance	
25	(England) Cameron Lancaster	Louisville City FC	Sporting Kansas City II	
26	(Serbia) Ilija Ilic	New Mexico United	San Diego Loyal SC	
27	(United States) Akeem Ward	Oakland Roots SC	San Diego Loyal SC	
28	(El Salvador) Joaquin Rivas	FC Tulsa	OKC Energy FC	

Save of the Week
Week	Goalkeeper	Club	Opponent	Ref.
1 & 2	(Chile) Vicente Reyes	Atlanta United 2	Louisville City FC	
3	(United States) Sean Lewis	FC Tulsa	Indy Eleven	
4	(United States) Jeff Dewsnup	Real Monarchs	LA Galaxy II	
5	(United States) Joe Kuzminsky	Charleston Battery	New York Red Bulls II	
6	(United States) Matt Cardone	San Antonio FC	Rio Grande Valley FC	
7	(United States) Matt Van Oekel	Birmingham Legion FC	FC Tulsa	
8	(United States) Keegan Meyer	Loudoun United FC	Tampa Bay Rowdies	
9	(United States) Mark Segbers	Memphis 901 FC	Atlanta United 2	
10	(United States) Brooks Thompson	Sporting Kansas City II	Memphis 901 FC	
11	(United States) Justin vom Steeg	LA Galaxy II	Phoenix Rising FC	
12	(Greece) Alexandros Tabakis	New Mexico United	Colorado Springs Switchbacks FC	
13	(United States) Jeff Dewsnup	Real Monarchs	Austin Bold FC	
14	(United States) Joe Kuzminsky	Charleston Battery	Charlotte Independence	
15	(United States) Jeff Caldwell	Hartford Athletic	Pittsburgh Riverhounds SC	
16	(United States) Colin Miller	Rio Grande Valley FC	Real Monarchs	
17	(Germany) Patrick Rakovsky	Orange County SC	Phoenix Rising FC	
18	(United States) Andre Rawls	Phoenix Rising FC	Sacramento Republic FC	
19	(United States) Parker Siegfried	Louisville City FC	Birmingham Legion FC	
20	(United States) Sean Lewis	FC Tulsa	Louisville City FC	
21	(United States) Joe Kuzminsky	Charleston Battery	Tampa Bay Rowdies	
22	(United States) Jeff Dewsnup	Real Monarchs	New Mexico United	
23	(United States) Jeff Caldwell	Hartford Athletic	Tampa Bay Rowdies	
24	(United States) Andre Rawls	Phoenix Rising FC	Orange County SC	
25	(United States) Joe Kuzminsky	Charleston Battery	Tampa Bay Rowdies	
26	(United States) Jordan Farr	Indy Eleven	Louisville City FC	
27	(United States) Jordan Farr	Indy Eleven	FC Tulsa	
28	(United States) Austin Wormell	FC Tulsa	Memphis 901 FC	

Team of the Week
Week	Goalkeeper	Defenders	Midfielders	Forwards	Bench	Ref.
**1**	No award					
**2**	(United States) Sparrow (MIA)	(Cuba) Corrales (TUL) (Ghana) Ashitey (HAR) (United States) Robinson (RGV) (United States) Bourgeois (TUL)	(England) Rogers (HAR) (Jamaica) Lambert (PHX) (Brazil) PC (SAN)	(Colombia) **Patiño** (SAN) (Spain) Moar (PHX) (Uruguay) Guenzatti (TBR)	(Spain) Bakero (PHX) (United States) Campbell (ATL) (United States) Cochran (IND) (Brazil) da Costa (TUL) (England) Gleadle (SAN) (United States) Louro (TBR) (England) Wyke (TBR)	
**3**	(United States) Deric (RGV)	(United States) Drack (LAG) (France) Cissoko (TAC) (United States) Lasso (TBR) (United States) Bourgeois (TUL)	(Burkina Faso) Bancé (SLC) (United States) Bone (LOU) (United States) Epps (SAN)	(Ghana) Asante (PHX) (El Salvador) **Rivas** (TUL) (Cape Verde) Dos Santos (TBR)	(Argentina) Cuello (SAN) (United States) Di Rosa (CHS) (Cameroon) Preston (HFD) (United States) Hernandez (LAG) (United States) Lopez (RGV) (United States) Swartz (NMU) (United States) Vom Steeg (LAG)	
**4**	(United States) **Van Oekel** (BHM)	(United States) Rayyan (TAC) (Trinidad and Tobago) Gomez (SAC) (United States) James (BHM)	(Democratic Republic of the Congo) Ngalina (COS) (Republic of the Congo) Etou (CLT) (Nigeria) Akinyode (MIA) (England) Hilton (TBR)	(Guinea) Barry (COS) (Cape Verde) Dos Santos (TBR) (Poland) Formella (SAC)	(United States) Berner (MEM) (United States) Kuzain (RGV) (England) Metcalf (SDG) (United States) Parra (CLT) (Mexico) Rivas (NMU) (Brazil) Torres (HFD) (Jamaica) Williams (MIA)	
**5**	(United States) Miller (CLT)	(United States) Flood (PHX) (United States) Hamilton (NMU) (France) Deplagne (SAN)	(United States) **McFadden** (ATL) (Trinidad and Tobago) Mitchell (NYR) (United States) Dacres (MEM) (England) Wehan (OCO)	(Azerbaijan) Dadashov (PHX) (Germany) Wild (IND) (Ghana) Asante (PHX)	(United States) Bronico (CLT) (United States) Flores (OAK) (United States) Jennings (LVL) (United States) McMahon (LOU) (Argentina) Solignac (ELP) (England) Stanley (ATL) (Greece) Tambakis (NMU)	
**6**	(United States) Pulskamp (SKC)	(Cuba) Diz Pe (RGV) (Colombia) Rovira (PGH) (Spain) Yuma (ELP) (England) Metcalf (SDG)	(United States) Dixon (PGH) (Brazil) **Lapa** (BHM) (United States) Griffin (PGH)	(Canada) Hamilton (IND) (Spain) Moar (PHX) (Venezuela) Bolívar (LDN)	(United States) Areman (CLT) (United States) Coronado (OKC) (United States) Guido (SDG) (United States) Hernandez (LAG) (Tunisia) Khmiri (SAN) (Cuba) Martínez (MIA) (United States) Vitiello (PGH)	
**7**	(United States) Kann (ATL)	(United States) Coronado (OKC) (United States) Rad (SKC) (United States) McFadden (ATL) (England) King (ELP)	(Mexico) Rodríguez (PHX) (Ivory Coast) Kissiedou (MEM) (United States) Barrera (HFD)	(Ghana) **Amoh** (RGV) (Jamaica) Brett (BHM) (Honduras) Obregón (HFD)	(Haiti) Damus (OCO) (United States) Duke (LVL) (Cameroon) Preston (HFD) (United States) Jennings (LVL) (United States) Louro (TBR) (Brazil) Torres (HFD) (United States) Wiley (ATL)	
**8**	(Germany) Lundt (PHX)	(Argentina) Varela (SAN) (United States) Totsch (LOU) (England) King (ELP)	(United States) Iloski (SLC) (United States) **Guido** (SDG) (United States) Luna (ELP) (United States) Areman (CLT)	(Ghana) Asante (PHX) (Democratic Republic of the Congo) Mushagalusa (SKC) (United States) Williams (BHM)	(United States) Charpie (LOU) (Haiti) Damus (OCO) (United States) Duke (LVL) (Uruguay) Guenzatti (TBR) (United States) Kuzain (RGV) (Spain) Moar (PHX) (United States) Muse (SDG)	
**9**	(United States) Cochran (OKC)	(United States) Gómez (LOU) (England) King (ELP) (United States) Yearwood (NMU) (United States) Segbers (MEM)	(United States) Rafanello (NYR) (Democratic Republic of the Congo) Ngalina (COS) (Scotland) Blake (SDG)	(Guinea) Barry (COS) (England) **Lancaster** (LOU) (United States) Judd (LAG)	(Colombia) Cabezas (RGV) (United States) Cicerone (PGH) (Haiti) Damus (OCO) (United States) Edelman (NYR) (United States) B. Edwards (IND) (France) Garcia (ATX) (United States) Torres (LVL)	
**10**	(Curaçao) de la Paz (OAK)	(United States) Anderson (COS) (Trinidad and Tobago) Hackshaw (IND) (United States) Coronado (OKC)	(United States) Serrano (TAC) (United States) Ownby (LOU) (Jamaica) Forbes (PGH) (United States) Bird (TUL)	(Guinea) **Barry** (COS) (Brazil) da Costa (TUL) (Jamaica) Daley (CHS)	(Ghana) Asante (PHX) (United States) Barbir (SKC) (United States) Donovan (OKC) (United States) Gdula (CHS) (Jamaica) Kelly (CLT) (United States) Louro (TBR) (Democratic Republic of the Congo) Ngalina (COS)	
**11**	(United States) Guerrero (SDG)	(United States) Schmitt (PHX) (Colombia) Castillo (NYR) (United States) Richards (OCO)	(United States) Ku-DiPietro (LDN) (Senegal) Diouf (ATX) (United States) Ownby (LOU) (United States) López (RGV)	(United States) Greig (LOU) (United States) **Mares** (ELP) (Ghana) Asante (PHX)	(United States) Anderson (COS) (Jamaica) Brett (BHM) (United States) Caldwell (HAR) (El Salvador) Calvillo (OCO) (United States) Gómez (LOU) (United States) Murphy (MEM) (Senegal) Traore (LVL)	
**12**	(United States) **Morton** (MEM)	(Mexico) Leone (LVL) (Mexico) Borelli (ELP) (United States) Smith (OCO)	(United States) Martinez (NMU) (United States) Crisostomo (LVL) (England) Wehan (OCO) (Haiti) François (MIA)	(Brazil) da Costa (TUL) (The Gambia) Sowe (NYR) (Argentina) Solignac (ELP)	(United States) Dick (IND) (United States) Janjigian (HAR) (Jamaica) Kelly (CLT) (Cuba) Martínez (MIA) (United States) Palomino (CLT) (Jamaica) Scarlett (TBR) (Senegal) Traore (LVL)	
**13**	(United States) Cardone (SAN)	(United States) Gómez (LOU) (United States) Farrell (PHX) (United States) Ryden (NMU) (Mexico) Borelli (ELP)	(Japan) Kurimoto (OKC) (Venezuela) Azócar (RGV) (United States) Griffin (PGH)	(Ghana) **Asante** (PHX) (United States) Bone (SAC) (Brazil) Fogaça (SAN)	(United States) Deric (RGV) (United States) Felipe (SAC) (Bermuda) Lewis (CHS) (Cuba) Martínez (MIA) (Canada) Montgomery (SDG) (New Zealand) Musa (PHX) (United States) Torres (ATX)	
**14**	(United States) **Kuzminsky** (CHS)	(United States) Dean (BHM) (United States) Lara (HAR) (United States) Richards (OCO)	(United States) Gallegos (SAN) (Jamaica) Forbes (PGH) (United States) Barrera (HFD) (United States) Drack (LAG)	(Brazil) Fogaça (SAN) (United States) Dixon (PGH) (Uruguay) Guenzatti (TBR)	(United States) Caldwell (HAR) (United States) Farrell (PHX) (United States) Gómez (LOU) (United States) Hernandez (LAG) (England) Hilton (TBR) (United States) Lopez (RGV) (United States) Wharton (PGH)	
**15**	(United States) Guerrero (SDG)	(United States) King (PHX) (United States) Bauer (ATL) (United States) Segbers (MEM)	(United States) Felipe (SAC) (Mexico) Rodríguez (PHX) (United States) Ownby (LOU) (Finland) Kuningas (OCO)	(United States) Jennings (LVL) (Argentina) **Solignac** (ELP) (United States) Dixon (PGH)	(Liberia) Harmon (CHS) (Trinidad and Tobago) Henry (OCO) (Haiti) Lacroix (SAC) (United States) Luna (ELP) (United States) Quinn (PHX) (Germany) Rakovsky (OCO) (Italy) Repetto (CHS)	
**16**	(England) Fordah (LDN)	(United States) Wiley (ATL) (Panama) Harvey (LAG) (Senegal) Traore (LVL)	(Jamaica) Lewis (COS) (El Salvador) Molina (LVL) (United States) Aguirre (LAG) (United States) Dixon (PGH)	(United States) **Wolff** (ATL) (Argentina) Daniels (OKC) (Brazil) Fogaça (SAN)	(United States) Adeniran (TAC) (United States) Ketterer (ELP) (United States) Lachowecki (TBR) (Germany) Löbe (MIA) (United States) Ownby (LOU) (United States) Quinn (PHX) (Scotland) Ross (ELP)	
**17**	(United States) Lewis (CHS)	(United States) Wiley (ATL) (Nigeria) Adesodun (CHS) (United States) Hinds (ATX) (Mexico) Guillén (TBR)	(Jamaica) **Williams** (MIA) (England) Law (IND) (United States) Mertz (ATL)	(England) Lancaster (LOU) (Guinea) Barry (COS) (United States) Goodrum (ATL)	(Ghana) Asiedu (BHM) (United States) Bronico (CLT) (Jamaica) Flemmings (BHM) (United States) Iwasa (SAC) (Bermuda) Lewis (CHS) (Uruguay) Martínez (CLT) (Germany) Rakovsky (OCO)	
**18**	(United States) Rawls (PHX)	(Ghana) Tetteh (NMU) (United States) Ragen (TAC) (England) Fox (ELP)	(United States) Barrera (HFD) (United States) Ibarra (SDG) (United States) Dixon (PGH) (United States) Ku-DiPietro (LDN)	(United States) **Cicerone** (PGH) (Turks and Caicos Islands) Forbes (MIA) (Democratic Republic of the Congo) Ngalina (COS)	(Trinidad and Tobago) Archer (CHS) (Guinea) Barry (COS) (United States) Bird (TUL) (United States) Caldwell (HAR) (France) Marveaux (CLT) (Australia) Osmond (OKC) (Colombia) Velásquez (ELP)	
**19**	(United States) **Louro** (TBR)	(Trinidad and Tobago) Hodge (COS) (United States) Sheldon (TUL) (United States) Lasso (TBR) (United States) Larraz (SDG)	(Mexico) Hernandez (LAG) (South Africa) Moloto (TUL) (England) Hilton (TBR)	(United States) Cicerone (PGH) (Brazil) Marlon (TUL) (Jamaica) Walker (MIA)	(Venezuela) Arteaga (IND) (United States) Calistri (PHX) (Cuba) Corrales (TUL) (Germany) Fall (OAK) (United States) Farr (IND) (Canada) James (BHM) (Sierra Leone) Williams (SDG)	
**20**	(United States) Cochran (OKC)	(United States) LeFlore (SKC) (United States) Farrell (PHX) (Trinidad and Tobago) Peters (PGH)	(United States) Suggs (NMU) (England) Wyke (TBR) (Nigeria) Akinyode (MIA) (United States) Epps (SAN)	(United States) **Hertzog** (SDG) (Jamaica) Mattocks (PHX) (United States) Judd (LAG)	(El Salvador) Calvillo (OCO) (United States) Cortez (NYR) (United States) Felipe (SAC) (United States) Gallegos (SAN) (Uruguay) Guenzatti (TBR) (United States) Lundgaard (ATL) (United States) Sheldon (TUL)	
**21**	(United States) Sparrow (MIA)	(United States) Roberts (CLT) (France) Garcia (ATX) (United States) Martin (SDG)	(France) **Ekra** (TBR) (Jamaica) Forbes (PGH) (France) Marveaux (CLT) (United States) Quinn (PHX)	(United States) Parra (CLT) (Uruguay) Guenzatti (TBR) (Haiti) François (MIA)	(Brazil) Fernandes (TBR) (Republic of Ireland) Kiernan (OCO) (United States) Mahoney (COS) (United States) Ownby (LOU) (United States) Pack (CLT) (United States) Rodriguez (OAK) (United States) Torres (COS)	
**22**	(United States) Cropper (MEM)	(Ghana) Yaro (SDG) (Canada) Thomas (MEM) (France) Garcia (ATX)	(United States) Quinn (PHX) (Scotland) Crawford (CHS) (Mexico) Perez (LAG) (England) Wehan (OCO)	(South Africa) Mfeka (OAK) (Uruguay) **Guenzatti** (TBR) (Guinea) Barry (COS)	(Germany) Fall (OAK) (United States) Gallegos (SAN) (France) Hoppenot (LOU) (Liberia) Johnson (CLT) (United States) Louro (TBR) (Spain) Moar (PHX) (United States) Murphy (MEM)	
**23**	(United States) Vom Steeg (LAG)	(United States) Gómez (LOU) (United States) Neal (LAG) (Trinidad and Tobago) Archer (CHS)	(United States) Anderson (COS) (Brazil) Fernandes (TBR) (United States) Luna (ELP) (Turks and Caicos Islands) Forbes (MIA)	(Jamaica) **Brett** (BHM) (Cuba) Martínez (MIA) (Bulgaria) Bijev (OKC)	(Cuba) Diz Pe (RGV) (England) Egbo (NYR) (Uruguay) Guenzatti (TBR) (Ghana) Kasim (BHM) (South Africa) Moshobane (SDG) (United States) Powers (OCO) (United States) Slayton (SLC)	
**24**	(United States) Cropper (MEM)	(United States) McFadden (ATL) (Ghana) Yaro (SDG) (Jamaica) McFarlane (MIA)	(Ivory Coast) **Kissiedou** (MEM) (Jamaica) Forbes (PGH) (Uruguay) Martínez (CLT) (United States) DelPiccolo (LOU) (Norway) Fjeldberg (RGV)	(Ivory Coast) Samake (LDN) (France) Marveaux (CLT)	(Mexico) Borelli (ELP) (United States) Crognale (BHM) (United States) Felipe (SAC) (South Africa) Mfeka (OAK) (Greece) Tambakis (NMU) (Mexico) Trejo (LVL) (England) Wyke (TBR)	
**25**	(United States) Vitiello (PGH)	(Montenegro) Klimenta (OAK) (Ivory Coast) Samake (LDN) (United States) Lopez (BHM)	(United States) Guido (SDG) (United States) Davis (SKC) (United States) DelPiccolo (LOU) (United States) Areman (CLT)	(United States) **Adeniran** (TAC) (Brazil) Fogaça (SAN) (England) Lancaster (LOU)	(Mexico) Borelli (ELP) (United States) Epps (SAN) (Brazil) Fernandes (TBR) (Uruguay) Guenzatti (TBR) (Mexico) Herrera (TAC) (United States) Ku-DiPietro (LDN) (United States) Murphy (MEM)	
**26**	(United States) Farr (IND)	(United States) Drack (LAG) (United States) Segbers (MEM) (Haiti) Apollon (HAR)	(United States) Quinn (PHX) (Scotland) Ross (ELP) (United States) Guido (SDG) (United States) Torres (SLC)	(United States) Jennings (LVL) (Jamaica) **Kelly** (CLT) (Mexico) Hernandez (LAG)	(United States) Batista (OKC) (United States) Dean (BHM) (United States) Dunbar (LAG) (United States) Judd (LAG) (United States) McGlynn (HAR) (Spain) Moar (PHX)	
**27**	(United States) Dewsnup (SLC)	(England) King (ELP) (England) Egbo (NYR) (United States) Gómez (LOU)	(Brazil) Lapa (BHM) (El Salvador) Sorto (RGV) (England) Wehan (OCO) (United States) Mares (ELP)	(England) **Lancaster** (LOU) (Mexico) Gómez (ELP) (United States) Vargas (TAC)	(Haiti) Damus (OCO) (United States) Garcia (TUL) (United States) Gdula (CHS) (Uruguay) Guenzatti (TBR) (Haiti) Herivaux (BHM) (United States) Panicco (ATX) (United States) Wharton (PGH)	
**28**	(Germany) Rakovsky (OCO)	(United States) Bourgeois (TUL) (The Gambia) Njie (RGV) (United States) Ford (SAN) (United States) Segbers (MEM)	(United States) Edelman (NYR) (England) Wehan (OCO) (Ivory Coast) Kissiedou (MEM)	(Saint Vincent and the Grenadines) **Edwards** (RGV) (Cape Verde) Dos Santos (TBR) (El Salvador) Martinez (HAR)	(United States) Lopez (RGV) (France) Obertan (CLT) (United States) Rafanello (NYR) (United States) Scott (MEM) (El Salvador) Sorto (RGV) (Uganda) Sserwadda (NYR) (United States) Ward (OAK)	
**Bold** denotes Player of the Week
