= Louis Ramsay =

English association football player

Personal information
- Full name: Louis Ramsay
- Date of birth: 23 September 1997 (age 29)
- Place of birth: Essex, England
- Height: 1.78 m (5 ft 10 in)
- Position: Right-back

Team information
- Current team: Welling United

Youth career
- –2014: Tottenham Hotspur
- 2014–2016: Norwich City

Senior career*
Years	Team	Apps	(Gls)
2016–2018	Norwich City	0	(0)
2017–2018	→ Woking (loan)	28	(0)
2018–2019	Leicester City	0	(0)
2019–2021	Billericay Town	23	(0)
2020	→ Hornchurch (loan)	3	(0)
2021–2022	Rio Grande Valley	6	(0)
2022–2023	Concord Rangers	37	(1)
2023–2024	Billericay Town	19	(0)
2024–2025	Dulwich Hamlet	18	(1)
2025–2026	Concord Rangers	6	(0)
2026–	Welling United	0	(0)
- * Club domestic league appearances and goals as of 12:23, 11 June 2026 (UTC)

Louis Ramsay (born 23 September 1997) is an English footballer who plays as a right-back for Isthmian League Premier Division club Welling United.

== Career ==
In July 2014, Ramsay joined Norwich City on a scholarship having previously been with Tottenham Hotspur. In July 2017, he joined National League side Woking on a season-long loan deal. In July 2018, he signed a deal with Leicester City, spending the season with their under-23 side.

In 2019, he joined National League South side Billericay Town before spending time on loan at Isthmian League side Hornchurch the following year. He made eight appearances for Hornchurch in all competitions.

In June 2021, Ramsay headed abroad to sign for USL Championship side Rio Grande Valley. On 6 June 2021, he made his professional debut, starting in a 4–2 win over Miami FC.

On 19 February 2022, Ramsay returned to England and signed for National League South side Concord Rangers. In May 2023, he returned to Billericay Town.

In June 2024, Ramsay joined Dulwich Hamlet.

In July 2025, Ramsay returned to Concord Rangers, now of the Isthmian League North Division.

In June 2026, Ramsay joined Isthmian League Premier Division club Welling United.

== Career statistics ==
As of end of 2025–26 season

Appearances and goals by club, season and competition
Club	Season	League			FA Cup		EFL Cup		Other		Total	
Club	Season	Division	Apps	Goals	Apps	Goals	Apps	Goals	Apps	Goals	Apps	Goals
Norwich City U23	2016–17	—			—		—		4 (Note: Appearances in the EFL Trophy)	0	4	0
Norwich City	2016–17	Championship	0	0	0	0	0	0	—		0	0
Norwich City	2017–18	Championship	0	0	—		0	0	—		0	0
Norwich City	Total		0	0	0	0	0	0	—		0	0
Woking (loan)	2017–18	National League	28	0	2	0	—		0	0	30	0
Leicester City U23	2018–19	—			—		—		2	0	2	0
Billericay Town	2019–20	National League South	17	0	5	0	—		1 (Note: Appearances in the FA Trophy)	0	23	0
Billericay Town	2020–21	National League South	6	0	—		—		—		6	0
Billericay Town	Total		23	0	5	0	—		1	0	29	0
Hornchurch (loan)	2020–21	Isthmian League Premier Division	3	0	2	0	—		3	0	8	0
Rio Grande Valley	2021	USL Championship	6	0	0	0	—		—		6	0
Concord Rangers	2021–22	National League South	10	0	—		—		—		10	0
Concord Rangers	2022–23	National League South	27	1	0	0	—		1	0	28	1
Concord Rangers	Total		37	1	0	0	—		1	0	38	1
Billericay Town	2023–24	Isthmian League Premier Division	19	0	2	0	—		6 (Note: Three appearances in FA Trophy, three appearances in Alan Turvey Trophy)	0	27	0
Dulwich Hamlet	2024–25	Isthmian League Premier Division	18	1	0	0	—		1	0	19	1
Concord Rangers	2025–26	Isthmian League North Division	6	0	0	0	—		0	0	6	0
Career total			140	2	11	0	0	0	18	0	169	2
