= Evan Louro =

American soccer player (born 1996)

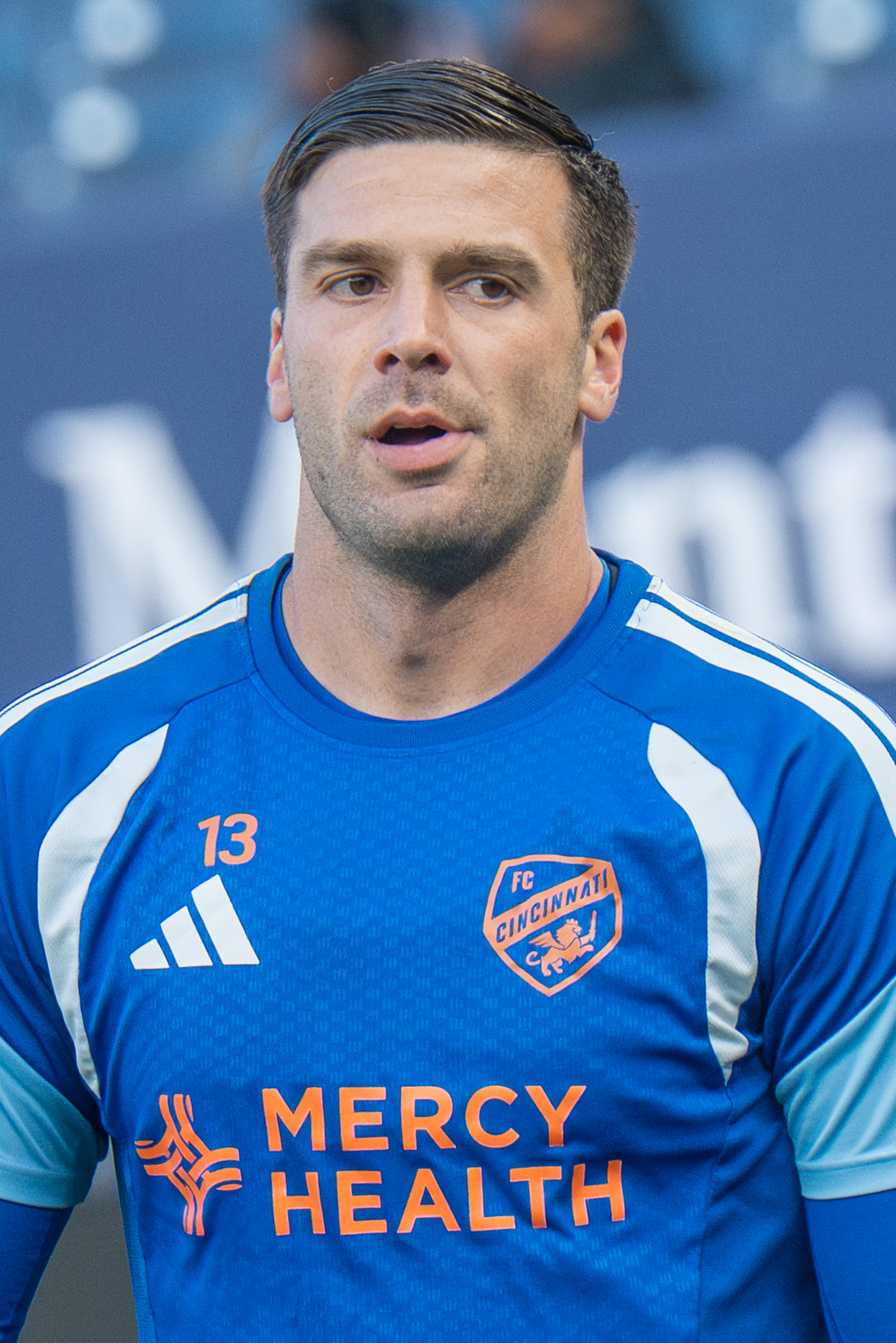
- Louro with FC Cincinnati in 2026

Personal information
- Full name: Evan Louro
- Date of birth: January 19, 1996 (age 30)
- Place of birth: South River, New Jersey, United States
- Height: 6 ft 3 in (1.91 m)
- Position: Goalkeeper

Team information
- Current team: FC Cincinnati
- Number: 36

Youth career
- 2008–2014: New York Red Bulls

College career
Years	Team	Apps	(Gls)
2014–2016	Michigan Wolverines	46	(0)

Senior career*
Years	Team	Apps	(Gls)
2015	New York Red Bulls U-23	9	(0)
2016	Detroit City FC	1	(0)
2016	New York Red Bulls U-23	8	(0)
2017–2019	New York Red Bulls	0	(0)
2017–2019	New York Red Bulls II	73	(0)
2020–2021	Tampa Bay Rowdies	47	(0)
2022–	FC Cincinnati	9	(0)
2022–	FC Cincinnati 2	16	(0)
- * Club domestic league appearances and goals as of 02:58, November 9, 2026 (UTC)

Evan Louro (born January 19, 1996) is an American soccer player who plays as a goalkeeper for FC Cincinnati in Major League Soccer.

== Career ==
=== Youth ===
Louro attended St. John Vianney High School in Holmdel Township, New Jersey, prior to his three-year career at the University of Michigan. During his time with the Wolverines soccer team, Louro played in 46 matches, earning 12 shutouts. He was also a member of the New York Red Bulls Academy for seven years during his youth, and helped lead the Red Bulls to the U16 Generation Adidas MLS Cup in 2011.

While in college, Louro made his semi-professional debut for Detroit City FC in a 2–2 draw against the Michigan Stars FC in 2016. He was voted "Man of the Match" on May 12, 2016, for his penalty-saving heroics against the Michigan Bucks in the U.S. Open Cup. He also played in the Premier Development League for New York Red Bulls U-23.

=== Professional ===
Louro signed a homegrown contract with the New York Red Bulls in MLS on January 23, 2017. The signing made him the second ever homegrown goalkeeper in the club's history after Santiago Castaño. On April 1, 2017, Louro made his professional debut for New York Red Bulls II, recording a shut out in a 1–0 victory over Richmond Kickers.

Louro joined the Tampa Bay Rowdies on January 21, 2020. In 2021, Louro won the USL Championship Golden Glove, having recorded a 0.74 goals against average and posting 14 shutouts. Following the 2021 season it was announced that Louro would leave the Rowdies.

Following a long injury rehabilitation, Louro signed with Major League Soccer side FC Cincinnati on August 22, 2022.

== Personal life ==
Louro was born to a Spanish father and an American mother of Spanish-Argentine descent.

== Career statistics ==
As of match played October 14, 2026

Appearances and goals by club, season and competition
Club	Season	League			Playoffs		National cup (Note: Includes U.S. Open Cup)		Continental		Other		Total	
Club	Season	Division	Apps	Goals	Apps	Goals	Apps	Goals	Apps	Goals	Apps	Goals	Apps	Goals
New York Red Bulls U-23	2015	PDL	9	0	—		—		—		—		9	0
Detroit City FC	2016	NPSL	1	0	—		1	0	—		—		2	0
New York Red Bulls U-23	2016	PDL	8	0	—		—		—		—		8	0
New York Red Bulls	2017	MLS	—		—		—		—		—		—	
New York Red Bulls	2018	MLS	—		—		—		—		—		—	
New York Red Bulls	2019	MLS	—		—		—		—		—		—	
New York Red Bulls	Total		—		—		—		—		—		—	
New York Red Bulls II	2017	USL	19	0	2	0	—		—		—		21	0
New York Red Bulls II	2018	USL	26	0	3	0	—		—		—		29	0
New York Red Bulls II	2019	USL Championship	28	0	1	0	—		—		—		29	0
New York Red Bulls II	Total		73	0	6	0	—		—		—		79	0
Tampa Bay Rowdies	2020	USL Championship	16	0	3	0	—		—		—		19	0
Tampa Bay Rowdies	2021	USL Championship	31	0	3	0	—		—		—		34	0
Tampa Bay Rowdies	Total		47	0	6	0	—		—		—		53	0
FC Cincinnati	2022	MLS	—		—		—		—		—		—	
FC Cincinnati	2023	MLS	—		—		—		—		—		—	
FC Cincinnati	2024	MLS	1	0	—		—		—		—		1	0
FC Cincinnati	2025	MLS	4	0	—		—		1 (Note: Appearance in CONCACAF Champions Cup)	0	2 (Note: Appearances in Leagues Cup)	0	7	0
FC Cincinnati	2026	MLS	4	0	—		—		1	0	3	0	8	0
FC Cincinnati	Total		9	0	—		—		2	0	5	0	16	0
FC Cincinnati 2	2022	MLSNP	4	0	—		—		—		—		4	0
FC Cincinnati 2	2023	MLSNP	8	0	—		—		—		—		8	0
FC Cincinnati 2	2024	MLSNP	3	0	—		—		—		—		3	0
FC Cincinnati 2	2025	MLSNP	1	0	—		—		—		—		1	0
FC Cincinnati 2	Total		16	0	—		—		—		—		16	0
Career total			162	0	12	0	1	0	2	0	5	0	180	0

== Honors ==
New York Red Bulls

- Supporters' Shield: 2018

Tampa Bay Rowdies

- USL Championship Regular Season Championship: (Note: Known since 2023 as the Players’ Shield) 2021

FC Cincinnati

- Supporters’ Shield: 2023

Individual

- USL Championship Goalkeeper of the Year: 2021
