= Eduin Quero =

Venezuelan footballer (born 1997)

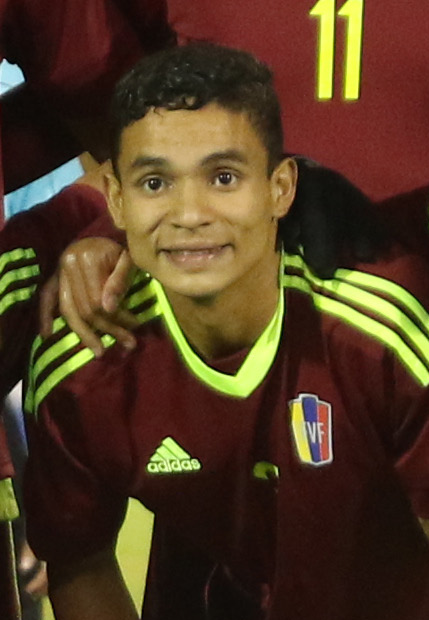
- Quero in 2017

Personal information
- Full name: Eduin Estiwer Quero Albarracín
- Date of birth: 22 April 1997 (age 29)
- Place of birth: San Cristóbal, Táchira, Venezuela
- Height: 1.72 m (5 ft 8 in)
- Position: Left-back

Team information
- Current team: Angostura
- Number: 23

Youth career
- Escuela Bicentenario
- 2011–2015: Deportivo Táchira

Senior career*
Years	Team	Apps	(Gls)
2015–2019	Deportivo Táchira	67	(0)
2018	→ Zulia (loan)	4	(0)
2019–2020	Casa Pia	1	(0)
2021	Deportivo La Guaira	0	(0)
2021	→ Rio Grande Valley FC (loan)	4	(1)
2022–2023	Héroes de Falcón		
2024–	Angostura	0	(0)

International career
2017	Venezuela U20	10	(0)
- * Club domestic league appearances and goals as of 23:57, 10 March 2024 (UTC)

Eduin Estiwer Quero Albarracín (born 22 April 1997) is a Venezuelan professional footballer who plays as a left-back for Angostura.

== Club career ==
Born in San Cristóbal in the state of Táchira, Quero began his career with the escuela de Fútbol Banfoandes, before joining the academy of professional side Deportivo Táchira at the age of fourteen. Having made his debut in the 2015 season, he established himself as a semi-regular first team player, before being loaned to Zulia at the beginning of 2018.

Following his return to Deportivo Táchira after his involvement in the animal abuse case with teammate David Barreto, he returned to the first team for the rest of the season, before featuring sparingly the following season. Having been released by the club, he moved to Portugal, signing with second-tier Casa Pia in July 2019.

After an uneventful spell in Portugal, where he featured once in the LigaPro, Quero returned to Venezuela to sign for Deportivo La Guaira, but was immediately loaned to United States side Rio Grande Valley FC. He scored his first and only goal for the USL Championship side in a 3–0 win against Real Monarchs on 5 August 2021.

In 2022, Quero signed with Venezuelan Segunda División side Héroes de Falcón, where he established himself as a key player, scoring once in thirteen appearances in his first season. For the 2024 season, Quero returned to top-flight football, signing with Angostura.

== International career ==
Quero was called up to the Venezuela under-20 side for the 2017 FIFA U-20 World Cup.

== Personal life ==
In 2018, while at Zulia, Quero recorded then-teammate David Barreto appearing to abuse a cat, posting the video to his Instagram account. Quero took to Instagram to issue an apology to fans, while both players were released by the club, with Quero returning to parent club Deportivo Táchira. A criminal investigation was launched, with the pair facing 40 peso fines.

== Career statistics ==
=== Club ===
As of 10 March 2024

Appearances and goals by club, season and competition
Club	Season	League			Cup		Continental		Other		Total	
Club	Season	Division	Apps	Goals	Apps	Goals	Apps	Goals	Apps	Goals	Apps	Goals
Deportivo Táchira	2015	Venezuelan Primera División	16	0	2 (Note: Appearances in the Copa Venezuela)	0	–		0	0	18	0
Deportivo Táchira	2016	Venezuelan Primera División	11	0	2	0	0	0	0	0	13	0
Deportivo Táchira	2017	Venezuelan Primera División	18	0	0	0	–		0	0	18	0
Deportivo Táchira	2018	Venezuelan Primera División	17	0	1	0	–		0	0	18	0
Deportivo Táchira	2019	Venezuelan Primera División	5	0	0	0	–		0	0	5	0
Deportivo Táchira	Total		67	0	5	0	0	0	0	0	72	0
Zulia (loan)	2018	Venezuelan Primera División	4	0	0	0	–		0	0	4	0
Casa Pia	2019–20	LigaPro	1	0	0	0	–		0	0	1	0
Deportivo La Guaira	2021	Venezuelan Primera División	0	0	0	0	–		0	0	0	0
Rio Grande Valley FC (loan)	2021	USL Championship	4	1	0	0	–		0	0	4	1
Angostura	2024	Venezuelan Primera División	0	0	0	0	–		0	0	0	0
Career total			76	1	5	0	0	0	0	0	81	1

== Honours ==
Venezuela U20

- FIFA U-20 World Cup runner-up: 2017
- South American Youth Football Championship third place: 2017
