= Wan Kuzain =

Malaysian footballer

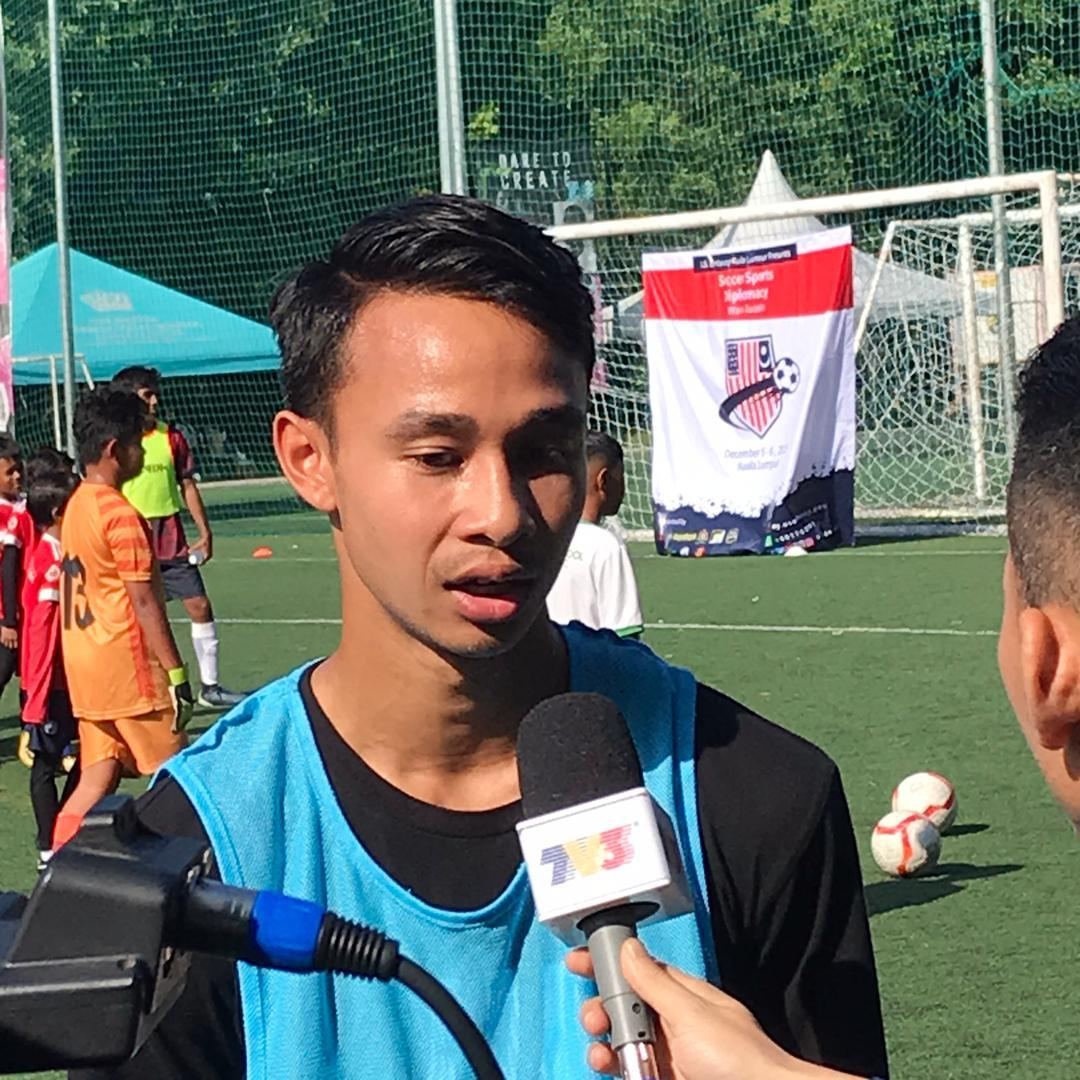
- Wan Kuzain in 2019

Personal information
- Full name: Wan Kuzain bin Wan Ahmad Kamal
- Date of birth: September 14, 1998 (age 28)
- Place of birth: Carbondale, Illinois, USA
- Height: 1.78 m (5 ft 10 in)
- Position: Midfielder

Team information
- Current team: Sporting JAX
- Number: 8

Youth career
- 2015–2016: St. Louis Scott Gallagher
- 2016–2017: Sporting Kansas City

Senior career*
| Years | Team | Apps | (Gls) |
| 2016 | Saint Louis FC | 0 | (0) |
| 2017–2020 | Sporting Kansas City II | 58 | (4) |
| 2018–2020 | Sporting Kansas City | 6 | (1) |
| 2021 | Rio Grande Valley FC | 19 | (3) |
| 2022–2025 | St. Louis City 2 | 88 | (14) |
| 2026– | Sporting JAX | 25 | (4) |

International career^{‡}
| 2015 | United States U17 | | |
| 2026– | Malaysia | 4 | (1) |
- * Club domestic league appearances and goals as of 16:49, 8 November 2026 (UTC) ‡ National team caps and goals as of 15:00, 28 July 2026 (UTC)

Wan Kuzain bin Wan Ahmad Kamal (born September 14, 1998) is a professional footballer who plays as a midfielder for USL Championship side Sporting JAX. Born in the United States, he was a United States youth international before appearing for the Malaysia national team.

== Career ==
=== Early ===
Born and raised by his Malaysian parents in Carbondale, Illinois, United States, Wan Kuzain played Academy soccer with St. Louis Scott Gallagher. He was chosen to represent United States U-17 soccer team in 2013 and 2014 and also trained with Feyenoord Academy in 2015. Wan Kuzain signed with United Soccer League side Saint Louis FC on May 21, 2016. While there, he spent time on loan with the club's USL Premier Development League side Saint Louis FC U23.

=== Swope Park Rangers ===
After spending time at the Sporting Kansas City academy, Wan Kuzain joined Kansas City's USL affiliate Swope Park Rangers in March 2017. That same year, he became the first player of Malaysian heritage to play in the USL, and to win the Western Conference.

=== Sporting Kansas City ===
Kuzain signed with the Sporting Kansas City first team in April 2018. Kuzain scored his first MLS goal on June 3, 2018, against Minnesota United in a 4–1 victory.

Kuzain's contract option was declined by Kansas City following their 2020 season.

=== Rio Grande Valley FC Toros ===
On March 1, 2021, Kuzain signed with USL Championship side Rio Grande Valley FC Toros.

=== St. Louis City 2 ===
On February 7, 2022, Kuzain signed with St. Louis City 2 in MLS Next Pro.

=== Sporting JAX ===
On January 17, 2026, via the team's YouTube channel, USL Championship expansion club Sporting Club Jacksonville, better known as Sporting JAX, announced the addition of Kuzain to their inaugural roster.

== International ==
Being born in the United States with Malaysian heritage, he is eligible to represent both the United States and Malaysia.

Kuzain has trained with and represented the United States at the under-17 level in 2013 and 2014.

In November 2019, Kuzain was called up to train with the Malaysia under-22 national team ahead of the 2019 Southeast Asian Games. However, he was left out of the squad due to citizenship documentation issue.

In 2026, he was called up to the Malaysia senior team for their campaign in the 2026 ASEAN Championship. He eventually made his international debut on 25 July in the match against Myanmar at the Thuwunna Stadium, coming on as a substitute in the second half. In the following match against Laos on 28 July, Kuzain, also coming on as a substitute, scored his first international goal, a near post free kick to give Malaysia a 4–0 victory at the Kuala Lumpur Stadium.

== Personal life ==
His older brother, Wan Ahmad Fayhsal, is a Malaysian politician, while his younger brother, Wan Kuzri, is a US-based soccer player who was selected to join the provisional Malaysia national under-23 football team preparing for the 2022 AFF U-23 Championship.

== Career statistics ==
As of match played July 13, 2026

| Club | Season | League | | | National cup (Note: Includes US Open Cup) | | Continental | | Other | | Total | |
| Club | Season | Division | Apps | Goals | Apps | Goals | Apps | Goals | Apps | Goals | Apps | Goals |
|---|---|---|---|---|---|---|---|---|---|---|---|---|
| Swope Park Rangers | 2017 | USL | 12 | 0 | – | | – | | 1 (Note: Appearances in playoffs) | 0 | 13 | 0 |
| Swope Park Rangers | 2018 | USL | 20 | 3 | – | | – | | 2 (Note: Appearances in playoffs) | 1 | 22 | 4 |
| Swope Park Rangers | 2019 | USL Championship | 25 | 1 | – | | – | | – | | 25 | 1 |
| Sporting Kansas City II | 2020 | USL Championship | 1 | 0 | – | | – | | – | | 1 | 0 |
| Sporting Kansas City II | Total | | 58 | 4 | 0 | 0 | 0 | 0 | 3 | 1 | 61 | 5 |
| Sporting Kansas City | 2018 | MLS | 6 | 1 | 2 | 0 | – | | – | | 8 | 1 |
| Sporting Kansas City | 2019 | MLS | 0 | 0 | 0 | 0 | 0 | 0 | 0 | 0 | 0 | 0 |
| Sporting Kansas City | 2020 | MLS | 0 | 0 | – | | – | | – | | 0 | 0 |
| Sporting Kansas City | Total | | 6 | 1 | 2 | 0 | 0 | 0 | 0 | 0 | 8 | 1 |
| Rio Grande Valley FC | 2021 | USL Championship | 19 | 3 | 0 | 0 | 0 | 0 | 0 | 0 | 19 | 3 |
| St. Louis City 2 | 2022 | MLS Next Pro | 23 | 5 | 2 | 1 | – | | 3 (Note: Appearances in playoffs) | 0 | 28 | 6 |
| St. Louis City 2 | 2023 | MLS Next Pro | 28 | 5 | – | | – | | 1 (Note: Appearances in playoffs) | 0 | 29 | 5 |
| St. Louis City 2 | 2024 | MLS Next Pro | 14 | 3 | – | | – | | 0 | 0 | 14 | 3 |
| St. Louis City 2 | 2025 | MLS Next Pro | 23 | 1 | – | | – | | 2 | 0 | 25 | 1 |
| St. Louis City 2 | Total | | 88 | 14 | 2 | 1 | 0 | 0 | 6 | 0 | 96 | 13 |
| Sporting Jax | 2026 | USL Championship | 12 | 2 | 4 | 0 | – | | 0 | 0 | 16 | 2 |
| Career total | | | 183 | 24 | 4 | 1 | 0 | 0 | 7 | 1 | 200 | 26 |

== Honors ==
Swope Park Rangers

- Western Conference: Winners (Playoffs) 2017
- United Soccer League Cup: Runner-up 2017

St. Louis City 2

- Western Conference (regular season): 2022
- Western Conference: 2022

Individual

- USL Fans' Choice Goal of the Year: 2018
- USL Young Player of the Year: Finalist 2018
