= Elvis Amoh =

Ghanaian footballer

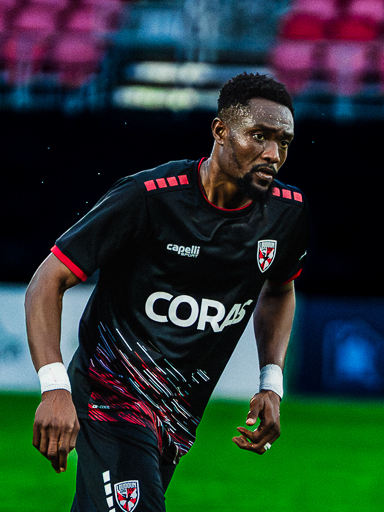
- Amoh with Loudoun United FC in 2026

Personal information
- Full name: Elvis Amoh
- Date of birth: February 2, 1992 (age 34)
- Place of birth: Accra, Ghana
- Height: 6 ft 2 in (1.88 m)
- Position: Forward

Team information
- Current team: Colorado Springs Switchbacks FC
- Number: 25

Youth career
- 2002–2005: Freedom Stars FC
- 2005–2008: Manchester FC
- 2009–2014: First Capital Plus FC

Senior career*
Years	Team	Apps	(Gls)
2014–2017	Asante Kotoko	16	(7)
2016–2017	→ WAFA SC (loan)	4	(2)
2017–2018	Capital City	0	(0)
2019	SK Líšeň	3	(0)
2019–2020	Loudoun United	24	(8)
2021	Rio Grande Valley	20	(11)
2022	Colorado Springs Switchbacks	33	(13)
2023	Hartford Athletic	27	(5)
2024	Detroit City	25	(3)
2025	Indy Eleven	27	(5)
2026	Loudoun United	4	(0)
2026–	Colorado Springs Switchbacks	6	(1)
- * Club domestic league appearances and goals as of November 7, 2026

Elvis Amoh (born February 2, 1992) is a Ghanaian footballer who plays as a forward for USL Championship club Colorado Springs Switchbacks FC.

== Career ==
In June 2016 he moved from First Capital Plus FC to Asante Kotoko and in June 2017 to West African Football Academy on loan, in May 2018 joined back to Asante Kotoko.

He joined Capital City F.C. in 2017. On 5 February 2018 was invited by Bethlehem Steel FC for a trial and featured in a friendly against FC Motown on February 10, 2018. Amoh was later signed by SK Líšeň.

Amoh signed with Loudoun United FC for the remainder of the 2019 season. On January 22, 2020, Amoh re-signed with Loudoun for the 2020 season.

On 19 March 2021, Amoh joined USL Championship side Rio Grande Valley FC. Amoh led RGV in scoring during their 2021 season.

Amoh signed with Colorado Springs Switchbacks FC on 21 December 2021. On 5 January 2023, Amoh was transferred to Hartford Athletic for an undisclosed transfer fee. He became a free agent following Hartford's 2023 season.

Amoh moved to USL Championship side Detroit City FC on 11 January 2024. Detroit declined his contract option following their 2024 season.

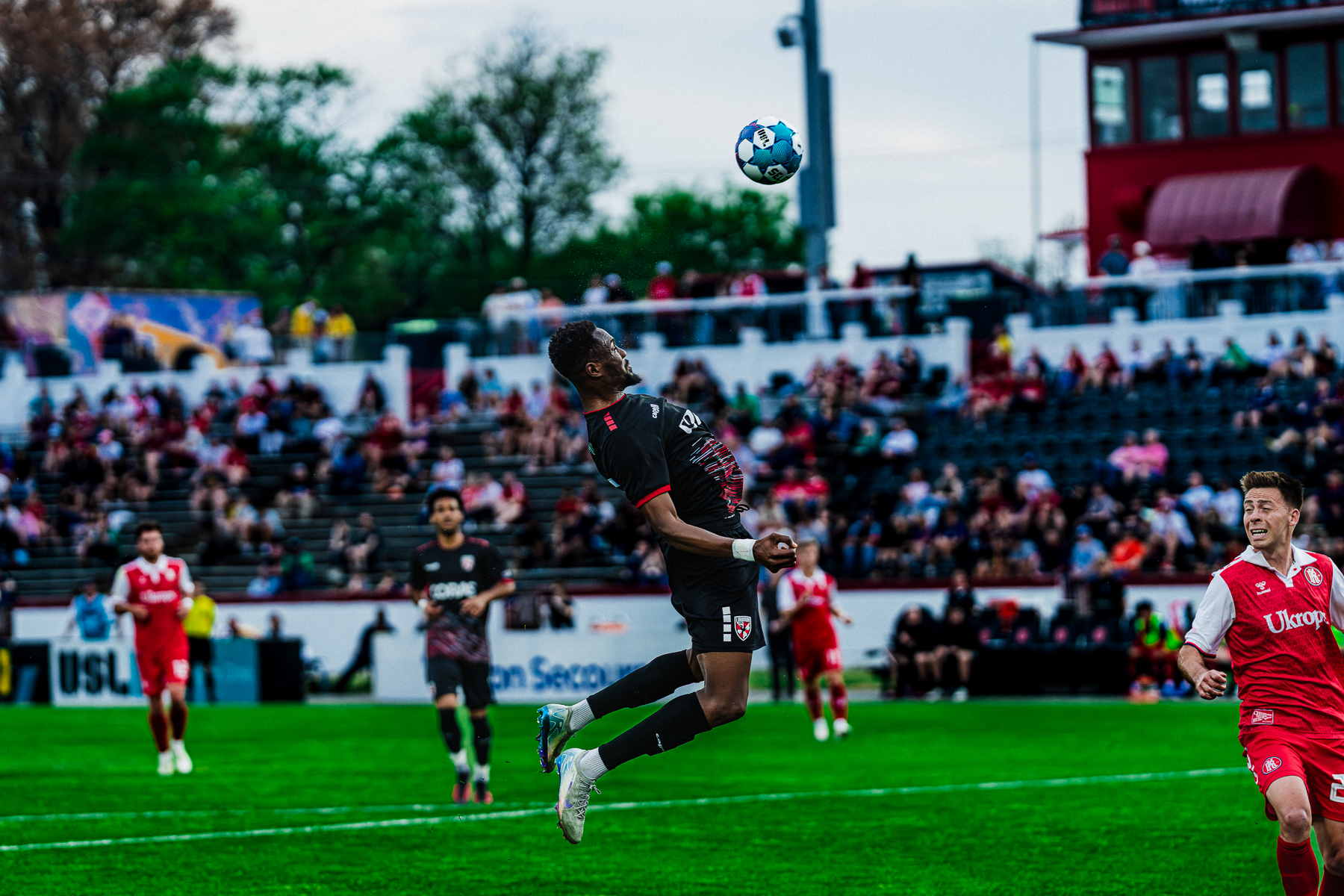
Amoh with Loudoun United FC in 2026

Amoh was signed by USL Championship side Indy Eleven on 7 January 2025, ahead of the 2025 season. He made his debut for the club on 15 March 2025 in a 3–1 victory against Miami FC. He scored his first goal for the club on 19 April in a 1–3 home loss against Charleston Battery. Amoh ended the season with 33 appearances and 9 goals in all appearances, including 5 goals in the USL Championship. Amoh's contract with Indy Eleven concluded at the end of the 2025 season.

Amoh signed a 25-day contract with Loudoun United FC on March 13, 2026.

In September 2026, Amoh returned to Colorado Springs Switchbacks for a second stint with the club, signing through the end of the 2026 USL Championship season.
