= Roberto Albuquerque =

American soccer player

Personal information
- Full name: Roberto Óscar Albuquerque
- Date of birth: November 4, 1993 (age 32)
- Place of birth: Park Ridge, Illinois, United States
- Height: 1.85 m (6 ft 1 in)
- Position: Defender

Team information
- Current team: Caudal

Youth career
- 2009–2012: Chicago Magic PSG

College career
Years	Team	Apps	(Gls)
2012–2015	Kansas City Roos	63	(4)

Senior career*
Years	Team	Apps	(Gls)
2018–2019	Lealtad	37	(3)
2019–2020	Mensajero	21	(3)
2020–2021	Real Avilés	28	(3)
2021	Rio Grande Valley FC	16	(0)
2022	Caudal		
2023–2024	Tuilla	26	(1)
2024–	Caudal	5	(0)
- * Club domestic league appearances and goals as of October 12, 2024

Roberto Óscar Albuquerque (born November 4, 1993) is an American soccer player who plays as a defender for Spanish club Caudal.

== Career ==
=== Youth ===
Albuquerque played club soccer with Chicago Magic PSG between 2009 and 2012. He also played high school soccer at Crystal Lake South High School.

=== College ===
In 2012, Albuquerque attended the University of Missouri–Kansas City to play college soccer. With the Roos, Albuquerque made 63 appearances and scored 4 goals over four seasons.

=== Professional ===
Albuquerque started his professional career in 2018 in Spain, playing with fourth-tier Tercera División side Lealtad. He then spent a season with Mensajero, before moving to third-tier side Real Avilés. On June 19, 2021, Albuquerque returned to the United States, joining USL Championship side Rio Grande Valley FC. He made his debut the same day, starting against San Antonio FC.

== Personal life ==
He is the son of Oscar Albuquerque and Lina Storti. He has two siblings, a twin sister and brother. His father played 15 years professionally in the MISL.
