= Juan Carlos Azócar =

Venezuelan footballer (born 1995)

Personal information
- Full name: Juan Carlos Azócar Segura
- Date of birth: 1 October 1995 (age 31)
- Place of birth: Maracay, Venezuela
- Height: 1.77 m (5 ft 10 in)
- Positions: Left-back; winger; forward

Team information
- Current team: Estudiantes de Mérida

Senior career*
Years	Team	Apps	(Gls)
2011–2013	Aragua	45	(4)
2013–2016	Deportivo Táchira	64	(5)
2014–2015	→ Carabobo (loan)	13	(0)
2017–2023	Deportivo La Guaira	74	(8)
2019–2020	→ Urartu (loan)	11	(2)
2020–2021	→ Rio Grande Valley FC (loan)	29	(7)
2022	→ Oakland Roots (loan)	35	(10)
2023	→ San Antonio FC (loan)	16	(0)
2024	Phoenix Rising	30	(0)
2025	Portuguesa	10	(2)
2025	Tampa Bay Rowdies	14	(0)
2026-	Estudiantes de Mérida	0	(0)

International career
2014	Venezuela U21	3	(0)
2015	Venezuela U20	2	(0)
- * Club domestic league appearances and goals

Juan Carlos Azócar Segura (born 1 October 1995) is a Venezuelan professional footballer who plays for Estudiantes de Mérida.

== Career ==
=== Urartu ===
On 1 September 2019, Azócar joined Urartu on loan from Deportivo La Guaira for the remainder of the 2019–20 season

=== Rio Grande Valley ===
On 28 August 2020, Azócar joined USL Championship side Rio Grande Valley FC on loan from his parent club Deportivo La Guaira, with an option to make the deal permanent. He made his debut for the club on 30 September 2020, starting in a 2–0 win over Austin Bold.

=== Oakland Roots ===
On 11 March 2022, Azócar joined USL Championship side Oakland Roots on loan ahead of their 2022 season. He left Oakland following their 2022 season.

=== San Antonio FC ===
On 23 December 2022, it was confirmed that Azócar would play on loan with San Antonio FC for the 2023 season in the USL Championship.

=== Phoenix Rising FC ===
Azócar signed with Phoenix Rising FC on December 15, 2023.
