= Colin Miller (soccer, born 1996) =

American soccer player

Personal information
- Date of birth: October 25, 1996 (age 30)
- Place of birth: Bel Air, Maryland, United States
- Height: 1.90 m (6 ft 3 in)
- Position: Goalkeeper

College career
Years	Team	Apps	(Gls)
2014–2018	Providence Friars	53	(0)

Senior career*
Years	Team	Apps	(Gls)
2017	Detroit City		
2019–2020	Loudoun United	10	(0)
2021–2022	Rio Grande Valley FC	12	(0)
- * Club domestic league appearances and goals as of October 21, 2022

Colin Miller (born October 25, 1996) is an American soccer player who plays as a goalkeeper.

== College and amateur ==
Miller played while a student C. Milton Wright High School in Bel Air, Maryland from 2010 to 2014, along with spending time in Baltimore Bays Chelsea F.C.'s youth academy.

Miller played college soccer at Providence College between 2014 and 2018, spending the 2014 season as a redshirt.

While at college, Miller appeared for National Premier Soccer League side Detroit City FC during their 2017 season.

== Professional ==
On February 27, 2019, Miller joined USL Championship side Loudoun United ahead of their inaugural season. He made his debut in the 31st minute in a game against Louisville City FC. He was re-signed by Loudoun on January 7, 2020.

Miller joined USL Championship side Rio Grande Valley FC on April 6, 2021.
