= 2022 Rio Grande Valley FC season =

Rio Grande Valley FC Toros
2022 season
- Head coach: Wilmer Cabrera
- USL Championship: 6th place Western Conference
- USL Playoffs: First round
- U.S. Open Cup: Third round
- Copa Tejas Division II: 2nd place
- Copa Tejas Shield: 5th place
- Highest home attendance: 5,333 (October 8, 2022)
- Lowest home attendance: 3,053 (May 28, 2022)
- Average home league attendance: 4,114
- Biggest win: 5-0 Las Vegas Lights FC (8/27)
- Biggest defeat: 0-1 LA Galaxy II (3/23); 1-0 LA Galaxy II (6/4); 1-0 New Mexico United (7/6); 0-1 Las Vegas Lights FC (7/16); 0-1 Louisville City FC (10/1)
Home colors	Away colors

The 2022 Rio Grande Valley FC Toros season was the 7th season for Rio Grande Valley FC Toros in USL Championship (USLC), the second-tier professional soccer league in the United States and Canada. This article covers the period from November 29, 2021, the day after the 2021 USLC Playoff Final, to the conclusion of the 2022 USLC Playoff Final, scheduled to be completed before November 14, 2021.

== Club ==
Note: Flags indicate national team as defined under FIFA eligibility rules; some limited exceptions apply. Players may hold more than one non-FIFA nationality. Squad correct as of May 29, 2022.

No.	Pos.	Nation	Player
1	GK	USA	Tyler Deric
2	DF	CUB	Daniel Luis
3	DF	GHA	Wahab Ackwei
4	DF	MEX	Erik Pimentel
5	MF	COL	Juan Cabezas
6	MF	USA	Isidro Martinez
8	MF	USA	Emilio Ycaza
9	FW	CUB	Frank López
10	MF	USA	Jose Torres
11	MF	ENG	Ollie Wright
12	GK	USA	Colin Miller
13	FW	USA	Duilio Herrera
14	DF	USA	Stefan Mueller
15	DF	USA	Jesús Vázquez
16	FW	COL	Frank Gaviria
17	MF	USA	Ricky Ruiz
18	FW	USA	Dylan Borczak
19	FW	MEX	Adolfo Hernández
20	MF	USA	Jonathan Ricketts
21	DF	USA	Robert Coronado
22	MF	USA	Juan Torres
23	DF	CUB	Frank Nodarse
24	DF	MNE	Luka Malešević
25	GK	USA	Javier Garcia
31	DF	USA	Akeem Ward

== Competitions ==
=== USL Championship ===
==== Match results ====
March 12, 2022 1	Rio Grande Valley FC Toros	1–0	Oakland Roots	Edinburg, Texas
7:30 PM CST	Vázquez (yellow card) 30'; López 34'; Malešević (yellow card) 53'; Martinez (yellow card) 59'	Report	Dennis (yellow card) 21'; Mfeka (yellow card) 65'; Fuenmayor (yellow card) 82'	Stadium: H-E-B Park; Attendance: 5,132; Referee: Brandon Stevis

March 19, 2022 2	Orange County SC	2–1	Rio Grande Valley FC Toros	Irvine, CA
9:00 PM CDT	Kuningas (yellow card) 39'; Henry (yellow card) 65'; Okoli 71', 90+9' (yellow card) 79'	Report	Ycaza (yellow card) 26' (yellow-red card) 55'; Ruiz (yellow card) 43'; Martinez (yellow card) 77'; López 86'; Luis (yellow card) 90+8'	Stadium: Championship Soccer Stadium; Attendance: 5,061; Referee: Elijio Arreguin

March 23, 2022 3	LA Galaxy II	1–0	Rio Grande Valley FC Toros	Carson, CA
9:30 PM CDT	Salazar (yellow card) 25'; Davilla 45' (yellow card) 63'; Harvey (yellow card) 59'; Judd (yellow card) 83'; Aguirre (yellow card) 89'	Report	Malešević (yellow card) 68'; López (yellow card) 90+3'	Stadium: Dignity Health Sports Park; Referee: Ricardo Fierro

March 27, 2022 4 Copa Tejas	Rio Grande Valley FC Toros	1–2	San Antonio FC	Edinburg, Texas
6:30 PM CDT	Ruiz (yellow card) 18'; Borczak 44'; López (yellow card) 49'; Vázquez (yellow card) 89'	Report	Diouf (yellow card) 8'; Collier 34' (yellow card) 36'; Loera 45' (yellow card) 90'; Traore (yellow card) 53'; Ayimbila (yellow card) 78'; Garcia (yellow card) 86'	Stadium: H-E-B Park; Attendance: 3,759; Referee: Jeremy Scheer

April 9, 2022 5	Rio Grande Valley FC Toros	1–2	Indy Eleven	Edinburg, Texas
7:30 PM CDT	Nodarse (yellow card) 26'; Ruiz (yellow card) 73'; López (yellow card) 76' (goal) 83'	Report	Rebellón (yellow card) 35'; Pinho (yellow card) 40' (goal) 69', 78'; McQueen (yellow card) 58'; Aguilera (yellow card) 90'	Stadium: H-E-B Park; Attendance: 3,357; Referee: Gerald Flores

April 15, 2022 6	New York Red Bulls II	0–1	Rio Grande Valley FC Toros	Montclair, NJ
6:00 PM CDT	Mullings (yellow card) 41'	Report	Luis (yellow card) 9'; Malešević (yellow card) 40'; López 66' (yellow card) 85'	Stadium: MSU Soccer Park; Attendance: 259; Referee: Thomas Snyder

April 23, 2022 7	Rio Grande Valley FC Toros	2–1	Sacramento Republic FC	Edinburg, Texas
7:30 PM CDT	Martinez (yellow card) 52'; Malešević 61'; Mueller (yellow card) 70'; Cabezas (yellow card) 90'; Borczak 90+2'	Report	Lacroix (yellow card) 20'; Martínez (yellow card) 39'; Felipe (yellow card) 52'; Sousa (yellow card) 60'; López (yellow card) 63'; Donovan 72'	Stadium: H-E-B Park; Attendance: 3,635; Referee: Elton García

April 30, 2022 8	Rio Grande Valley FC Toros	1–2	Orange County SC	Edinburg, Texas
7:30 PM CDT	Ruiz 5'; Borczak (yellow card) 71'; Coronado (yellow card) 81'	Report	Torres 3', 39'; Richards (yellow card) 59'; Orozco (yellow card) 90+7'; Kunigas (yellow card) 90+8'	Stadium: H-E-B Park; Attendance: 3,316; Referee: Matthew Corrigan

May 5, 2022 9	Colorado Springs Switchbacks FC	3–2	Rio Grande Valley FC Toros	Colorado Springs, CO
8:00 PM CDT	Zandi (yellow card) 33' (goal) 52'; Amoh 43'; Barry (yellow card) 45+1'; Herrera (yellow card) 45+4'; Malešević 64' (o.g.); Hodge (red card) 81'; Makangila (yellow card) 90'	Report	Vázquez (yellow card) 19'; Deric (yellow card) 45+1'; Nodarse 74'; Ackwei 79'	Stadium: Weidner Field; Attendance: 7,128; Referee: Malik Badawi

May 14, 2022 10	Monterey Bay FC	1–2	Rio Grande Valley FC Toros	Seaside, CA
9:00 PM CDT	Robinson (yellow card) 11'; Roberts 20'; Martinez (yellow card) 31'; Crawford (yellow card) 32' (yellow-red card) 71'; Conneh (yellow card) 90+3'	Report	Ycaza 42' (yellow card) 45+6'; Coronado 45+2'; Ricketts (yellow card) 70'; Cabezas (yellow card) 90+1'; López (yellow card) 90+6'	Stadium: Cardinale Stadium; Attendance: 3,078; Referee: Michael Radchuk

May 21, 2022 11	Rio Grande Valley FC Toros	2–1	San Diego Loyal SC	Edinburg, Texas
7:30 PM CDT	Ycaza (yellow card) 23' (goal) 76', 80'; Martinez (yellow card) 87'	Report	Guido (yellow card) 5'; Adams (yellow card) 35'; Vassell 37' (pen.); Stoneman (yellow card) 59'; Martin (yellow card) 79'; Moshobane (yellow card) 84'	Stadium: H-E-B Park; Attendance: 3,500; Referee: Matthew Franz

May 28, 2022 12 Copa Tejas	Rio Grande Valley FC Toros	2–3	San Antonio FC	Edinburg, Texas
7:30 PM CDT	Cabezas 41'; Ycaza (yellow card) 56'; López (yellow card) 71'; Hernández (yellow card) 76'; Pimentel (red card) 77'; Achwei (yellow card) 79'; Malešević (yellow card) 80'; Herrera 90+2'	Report	Dhillon 26', 87' (yellow card) 31'; Traore (yellow card) 31'; Garcia (yellow card) 43'; Khmiri (yellow card) 45+5'; Taintor 62' (yellow card) 79'; Delem (yellow card) 89'	Stadium: H-E-B Park; Attendance: 3,053; Referee: Melvin Rivas

June 1, 2022 13	Atlanta United 2	3–4	Rio Grande Valley FC Toros	Kennesaw, GA
6:30 PM CDT	Raimar 45+1' (pen.) (yellow card) 78'; Mertz 50', 65'; Morales (yellow card) 55'	Report	Ycaza 22'; Hernández 26'; Torres (yellow card) 64'; Coronado 77', 90+2'	Stadium: Fifth Third Bank Stadium; Attendance: 584; Referee: Izlen Peksenar

June 4, 2022 14	Rio Grande Valley FC Toros	0–1	LA Galaxy II	Edinburg, Texas
7:30 PM CDT	Deric (yellow card) 5'; Ricketts (yellow card) 28'; Vázquez (yellow card) 45+1'; Torres (red card) 90+6'	Report	Judd (yellow card) 21' (goal) 48'; Dunbar (yellow card) 31'; Cabrel (yellow card) 44'; Lopez (yellow card) 63'; Campbell (yellow card) 90+5'	Stadium: H-E-B Park; Attendance: 3,335; Referee: Calin Radosav

June 11, 2022 15	Oakland Roots	2–2	Rio Grande Valley FC Toros	Oakland, CA
9:00 PM CDT	Morad (yellow card) 1'; Azócar 78'; Karsson (yellow card) 80'; Dennis 88'	Report	Coronado 14'; Ackwei (yellow card) 15' (goal) 24'; Torres (yellow card) 35'; Pimentel (yellow card) 39'; Malešević (yellow card) 66'; Ycaza (yellow card) 69'; Garcia (yellow card) 80'	Stadium: Laney College Football Stadium; Attendance: 4,215; Referee: Joseph Salinas

June 18, 2022 16	Rio Grande Valley FC Toros	1–0	Pittsburgh Riverhounds SC	Edinburg, Texas
7:30 PM CDT	Ruiz 34'	Report		Stadium: H-E-B Park; Attendance: 4,083; Referee: Brandon Stevis

June 29, 2022 17 Copa Tejas	Rio Grande Valley FC Toros	0–0	El Paso Locomotive FC	Edinburg, Texas
7:30 PM CDT	Hernández (yellow card) 83'	Report	Sonupe (yellow card) 32'; Yuma (yellow card) 61' (yellow-red card) 83'; Velásquez (yellow card) 90'	Stadium: H-E-B Park; Attendance: 2,519; Referee: Gerald Flores

July 6, 2022 18	New Mexico United	1–0	Rio Grande Valley FC Toros	Albuquerque, NM
8:00 PM CDT	Suggs (yellow card) 69'; Nava (yellow card) 69'; Portillo 84' (pen.)	Report	Coronado (yellow card) 40'; Pimentel (yellow card) 55'; Ycaza (yellow card) 69'; Ruiz (yellow card) 74'; Ricketts (yellow card) 80'; Ackwei (yellow card) 83'	Stadium: Isotopes Park; Referee: Kevin Stott

July 9, 2022 19	New Mexico United	1–1	Rio Grande Valley FC Toros	Albuquerque, NM
8:00 PM CDT	Kiesewetter 22' (yellow card) 45+1'; Tetteh (yellow card) 25'; Bruce (yellow card) 45+1'; Souahy (yellow card) 54'; Nava (yellow card) 80'	Report	Pimental (yellow card) 52'; Cabezas (yellow card) 71'; Ricketts (yellow card) 79'; Vázquez 90'	Stadium: Isotopes Park; Attendance: 10,781; Referee: Elijio Arreguin

July 17, 2022 20	Rio Grande Valley FC Toros	0–1	Las Vegas Lights FC	Edinburg, Texas
6:30 PM CDT	Cabezas (yellow card) 53'; Ward (yellow card) 74'	Report	Bjørshol 27'; Quezada (yellow card) 49'; Daroma (yellow card) 65'; Romero (yellow card) 66'	Stadium: H-E-B Park; Attendance: 5,069; Referee: Gabriele Giusti

July 23, 2022 21	San Diego Loyal SC	2–1	Rio Grande Valley FC Toros	San Diego, CA
9:00 PM CDT	Blake (yellow card) 35'; Metcalf (yellow card) 38'; Moshobane 39'; Amang (yellow card) 43'; Conway 55'; Martin (yellow card) 57'; Riley (yellow card) 64'; Martin (yellow card) 76'	Report	Pimentel (yellow card) 15', (goal) 49'; Cabezas (yellow card) 29'; Torres (yellow card) 88'	Stadium: Torero Stadium; Attendance: 4 Referee: Michael Radchuk

July 27, 2022 22	Rio Grande Valley FC Toros	0–0	Hartford Athletic	Edinburg, Texas
7:30 PM CDT	Pimentel (yellow card) 57'; Ricketts (yellow card) 59'; Ward (yellow card) 67'	Report	Brewitt (yellow card) 33'; Lewis (yellow card) 87'	Stadium: H-E-B Park; Attendance: 3,657; Referee: Luis Guardia

August 6, 2022 23	Sacramento Republic FC	1–1	Rio Grande Valley FC Toros	Sacramento, CA
10:00 PM CDT	Cuello (yellow card) 51'; Foster (yellow card) 61'; López (yellow card) 67', (goal) 90'; Martínez (yellow card) 79'; Keko (yellow card) 90+5'	Report	Pimentel (yellow card) 26'; Ricketts 53'; Nodarse (yellow card) 90+4'	Stadium: Heart Health Park; Attendance: 8,196; Referee: Malik Badawi

August 20, 2022 24 Copa Tejas	San Antonio FC	2–2	Rio Grande Valley FC Toros	San Antonio, Texas
8:00 PM CDT	Khmiri (yellow card) 17'; Abu (yellow card) 18'; Farr (yellow card) 43'; Adeniran (yellow card) 45'; Maloney (yellow card) 53'; Gomez 59'; Bailone (yellow card) 84'; Taintor (yellow card) 90', (goal) 90+6'	Report	Pinzón 34'; Ward 36', (yellow card) 90+5'; Ycaza (yellow card) 80'; Coronado (yellow card) 90+9' (yellow-red card) 90+10'	Stadium: Toyota Field; Attendance: 6,511; Referee: Greg Dopka

August 27, 2022 25	Las Vegas Lights FC	0–5	Rio Grande Valley FC Toros	Las Vegas, NV
9:30 PM CDT	Lara (red card) 14'	Report	Ward (yellow card) 24'; Pinzón 28'; Fjeldberg 36', 51'; Pimental 44'; Ruiz 58'	Stadium: Cashman Field; Referee: Benjamin Meyer

August 31, 2022 26	Phoenix Rising FC	2–1	Rio Grande Valley FC Toros	Tempe, AZ
9:30 PM CDT	Musa (yellow card) 3'; Seijas 15', 67'; Rodríguez (yellow card) 75'; Repetto (yellow card) 90+3'	Report	Cabezas (yellow card) 17'; Ackwei (yellow card) 21'; Pinzón 41'; Pimentel (yellow card) 49'	Stadium: Phoenix Rising Stadium; Referee: José Carlos Rivero

September 7, 2022 27 Copa Tejas	El Paso Locomotive FC	0–2	Rio Grande Valley FC Toros	El Paso, Texas
8:00 PM CDT	Hinds (yellow card) 13'; Borelli	Report	López 72'; Pinzón 80'; Torres (yellow card) 86'	Stadium: Southwest University Park; Attendance: 7,589; Referee: Mark Allatin

September 10, 2022 28	Rio Grande Valley FC Toros	3–1	New Mexico United	Edinburg, Texas
7:30 PM CDT	Ycaza 15'; Pinzon 22'; Fjeldberg 68'	Report	Moreno 8'; Portillo (yellow card) 45+1'; Ovouka (yellow card) 73'	Stadium: H-E-B Park; Attendance: 4,668; Referee: Elton García

September 17, 2022 29	Rio Grande Valley FC Toros	1–0	Colorado Springs Switchbacks FC	Edinburg, Texas
7:30 PM CDT	Fjeldberg 29'; Ruiz (yellow card) 45+2'; Nodarse (yellow card) 48'; Cabezas (yellow card) 51'; Ward (yellow card) 81'	Report	Hodge (yellow card) 38'; Lindley 45+3'; Echevarria (yellow card) 90+3'	Stadium: H-E-B Park; Attendance: 4,534; Referee: Luis Guardia

September 23, 2022 30	Charleston Battery	0–3	Rio Grande Valley FC Toros	Mt. Pleasant, SC
6:00 PM CDT	Pérez (yellow card) 26'; Crawford (yellow card) 81'; Paterson (yellow card) 90+2'	Report	Ward (yellow card) 22'; Pinzón 55', 76'; Torres 80'	Stadium: Patriots Point; Attendance: 3,159; Referee: Alejo Calume

October 1, 2022 31	Rio Grande Valley FC Toros	0–1	Louisville City FC	Edinburg, Texas
7:30 PM CDT	Pimental (yellow card) 73'; Pinzón (yellow card) 80'; Ward (yellow card) 90+2'	Report	Harris 32', (yellow card) 76'; Moguel (yellow card) 64'; Pino (yellow card) 86'	Stadium: H-E-B Park; Attendance: 4,748; Referee: Ricardo Fierro

October 5, 2022 32	Memphis 901 FC	2–2	Rio Grande Valley FC Toros	Memphis, TN
7:30 PM CDT	Kelly 2', (yellow card) 69'; Smith (yellow card) 33'; Goodrum (yellow card) 48'; Kissiedou 55'; Logue (yellow card) 60'; Paul (yellow card) 79'	Report	Malešević (yellow card) 29'; Torres 73'; Smith 80' (o.g.); Fjeldberg (yellow card) 90+1'	Stadium: Autozone Park; Attendance: 3,072; Referee: Gabriele Giusti

October 8, 2022 33	Rio Grande Valley FC Toros	2–1	Phoenix Rising FC	Edinburg, Texas
7:00 PM CDT	Fjeldberg 39', 55'; Ricketts (yellow card) 74'	Report	Torres 48'; Seijas (yellow card) 83'; Hurst (red card) 90+4'	Stadium: H-E-B Park; Attendance: 5,333; Referee: Elijio Arregui

October 15, 2022 34	Rio Grande Valley FC Toros	4–1	Monterey Bay FC	Edinburg, Texas
7:30 PM CDT	Torres 6'; López 33', (yellow card) 47'; Toyama 60' (o.g.); Ward 90+2'	Report	Gorskie (red card) 5'; Conneh (yellow card) 9'; Toyama (yellow card) 25'; Rebollar (yellow card) 90'; Maldonado 90+4'	Stadium: H-E-B Park; Attendance: 5,139; Referee: Brad Jensen

==== Standings — Western Conference ====
Pos	Team	Pld	W	L	T	GF	GA	GD	Pts	Qualification
1	San Antonio FC (C, X)	34	24	5	5	54	26	+28	77	Qualification for the Conference Semifinals
2	San Diego Loyal SC	34	18	10	6	68	55	+13	60	Playoffs
3	Colorado Springs Switchbacks	34	17	13	4	59	53	+6	55	Playoffs
4	Sacramento Republic	34	15	11	8	48	34	+14	53	Playoffs
5	New Mexico United	34	13	9	12	49	40	+9	51	Playoffs
6	Rio Grande Valley Toros	34	14	13	7	51	40	+11	49	Playoffs
7	Oakland Roots SC	34	11	10	13	51	46	+5	46	Playoffs
8	El Paso Locomotive FC	34	13	14	7	56	52	+4	46	
9	Las Vegas Lights FC	34	12	13	9	40	50	−10	45	
10	Phoenix Rising FC	34	12	16	6	50	58	−8	42	
11	LA Galaxy II	34	11	16	7	53	63	−10	40	
12	Monterey Bay FC	34	12	18	4	42	59	−17	40	
13	Orange County SC	34	7	14	13	49	59	−10	34	

Source: USL Championship Standings
Rules for classification: 1) head-to-head points; 2) head-to-head goal differential; 3) points-per game within conference; 4) total wins; 5) total goal differential; 6) total goals scored; 7) points earned against top four Conference finishers; 8) disciplinary points; 9) coin toss or drawing of lots
(C) Champions; (X) Regular Season League Champion

=== Play-offs ===
==== Match results ====
October 22, 2022 First Round	Colorado Springs Switchbacks	3–0	Rio Grande Valley FC Toros	Colorado Springs, CO
7:30 PM MST	Amoh (yellow card) 29'; Henríquez 84'; Wheeler 90', 90+4'	Report	Ricketts (yellow card) 23'	Stadium: Weidner Field; Attendance: 7,036; Referee: Mark Allatin

=== U.S. Open Cup ===
With the end of their affiliation agreement with the Houston Dynamo, Rio Grande Valley FC is eligible to compete in the U.S. Open Cup for the first time in club history in 2022.

April 6, 2022 2nd	North Carolina FC (USL1)	1–2	Rio Grande Valley FC Toros (USLC)	Cary, NC
6:00 PM CDT	Blanco (yellow card) 10'; Servania 45'; Anderson (yellow card) 53'; Young (yellow card) 77'; Tolentino (yellow card) 90+4'	Report	Nodarse (yellow card) 45+2' (goal) 79'; López 54'; Ricketts (yellow card) 90+2'	Stadium: WakeMed Soccer Park; Referee: John Rush

April 19, 2022 3rd	Houston Dynamo (MLS)	2–1	Rio Grande Valley FC Toros (USLC)	Houston, TX
8:30 PM CDT	Nodarse 9' (o.g.); Junqua 90+3'; Castilla (yellow card) 90+6'	Report	Hadebe 48' (o.g.)	Stadium: PNC Stadium; Referee: Elton García

=== Statistics ===
Numbers after plus-sign(+) denote appearances as a substitute.

==== Appearances and goals ====
No.	Pos	Nat	Player	Total		USL Championship		Playoffs		U.S. Open Cup	
No.	Pos	Nat	Player	Apps	Goals	Apps	Goals	Apps	Goals	Apps	Goals
1	GK	(United States) USA	Tyler Deric	24	0	23+1	0	0+0	0	0+0	0
2	DF	(Cuba) CUB	Daniel Luis	9	0	4+4	0	0+0	0	0+1	0
3	DF	(Ghana) GHA	Wahab Ackwei	35	2	31+2	2	0+0	0	2+0	0
4	DF	(Mexico) MEX	Erik Pimentel	24	3	21+3	3	0+0	0	0+0	0
5	MF	(Colombia) COL	Juan Cabezas	32	1	27+3	1	0+0	0	1+1	0
6	MF	(United States) USA	Isidro Martinez	33	0	18+13	0	0+0	0	1+1	0
7	MF	(Norway) NOR	Jonas Fjeldberg	12	9	11+1	9	0+0	0	0+0	0
8	MF	(United States) USA	Emilio Ycaza	37	5	33+2	5	0+0	0	2+0	0
9	FW	(Cuba) CUB	Frank López	26	6	14+10	5	0+0	0	2+0	1
10	MF	(United States) USA	José Torres	23	0	18+5	0	0+0	0	0+0	0
11	MF	(England) ENG	Ollie Wright	4	0	1+3	0	0+0	0	0+0	0
12	GK	(United States) USA	Colin Miller	8	0	6+0	0	0+0	0	2+0	0
13	FW	(United States) USA	Duilio Herrera Ibarra	14	1	3+10	1	0+0	0	0+1	0
14	DF	(United States) USA	Stefan Mueller	11	0	7+3	0	0+0	0	1+0	0
15	DF	(United States) USA	Jesús Vázquez	17	1	11+5	1	0+0	0	1+0	0
16	FW	(Colombia) COL	Frank Gaviria	10	0	5+5	0	0+0	0	0+0	0
17	MF	(United States) USA	Ricky Ruiz	36	4	29+5	4	0+0	0	2+0	0
18	FW	(United States) USA	Dylan Borczak	23	2	10+11	2	0+0	0	2+0	0
19	FW	(United States) USA	Adolfo Hernández	9	1	5+4	1	0+0	0	0+0	0
20	MF	(United States) USA	Jonathan Ricketts	36	1	28+6	1	0+0	0	2+0	0
21	DF	(United States) USA	Robert Coronado	28	4	11+15	4	0+0	0	1+1	0
22	MF	(United States) USA	Juan Torres	28	3	15+12	3	0+0	0	1+0	0
23	DF	(Cuba) CUB	Frank Nodarse	21	2	12+7	1	0+0	0	2+0	1
24	DF	(Montenegro) MNE	Luka Malešević	18	1	13+5	1	0+0	0	0+0	0
25	GK	(United States) USA	Javier Garcia	6	0	6+0	0	0+0	0	0+0	0
29	MF	(Mexico) MEX	Christian Pinzón	15	8	13+2	8	0+0	0	0+0	0
31	DF	(United States) USA	Akeem Ward	15	2	15+0	2	0+0	0	0+0	0
	FW	(Ghana) GHA	Nafiu Sulemana	0	0	0+0	0	0+0	0	0+0	0

- Last updated: October 18, 2022
- Source: https://www.uslchampionship.com/rio-grande-valley-fc-player-stats

=== Top scorers ===
Rank	Position	Number	Name	USL Championship	USL Playoffs	U.S. Open Cup	Total
1	MF	7	(Norway) Jonas Fjeldberg	9	0	0	9
2	MF	29	(Mexico) Christian Pinzón	8	0	0	8
3	FW	9	(Cuba) Frank López	6	0	1	7
4	MF	8	(United States) Emilio Ycaza	5	0	0	5
5	DF	21	(United States) Robert Coronado	4	0	0	4
5	MF	17	(United States) Ricky Ruiz	4	0	0	4
7	MF	4	(Mexico) Erik Pimentel	3	0	0	3
7	MF	22	(United States) Juan Torres	3	0	0	3
8	DF	3	(Ghana) Wahab Ackwei	2	0	0	2
8	FW	18	(United States) Dylan Borczak	2	0	0	2
8	MF	23	(Cuba) Frank Nodarse	1	0	1	2
8	DF	31	(United States) Akeem Ward	2	0	0	2
11	MF	5	(Colombia) Juan Cabezas	1	0	0	1
11	FW	13	(United States) Duilio Herrera	1	0	0	1
11	DF	15	(United States) Jesús Vázquez	1	0	0	1
11	FW	16	(Colombia) Frank Gaviria	1	0	0	1
11	FW	19	(Mexico) Adolfo Hernández	1	0	0	1
11	FW	22	(England) Ollie Wright	1	0	0	1
Total				52	0	2	54

- Last updated: October 18, 2022
- Source: https://www.uslchampionship.com/rio-grande-valley-fc-player-stats

=== Top assists ===
Rank	Position	Number	Name	USL Championship	USL Playoffs	U.S. Open Cup	Total
1	MF	10	(United States) José Torres	9	0	0	9
1	MF	17	(United States) Ricky Ruiz	8	0	1	9
2	MF	6	(United States) Isidro Martinez	6	0	1	7
4	MF	8	(Ghana) Wahab Ackwei	5	0	0	5
4	MF	3	(United States) Emilio Ycaza	5	0	0	5
6	MF	29	(Mexico) Christian Pinzón	3	0	0	3
7	FW	9	(Cuba) Frank López	2	0	0	2
8	FW	19	(Mexico) Adolfo Hernández	1	0	0	1
8	DF	20	(United States) Jonathan Ricketts	1	0	0	1
8	DF	21	(United States) Robert Coronado	1	0	0	1
8	MF	22	(United States) Juan Torres	1	0	0	1
8	DF	24	(Montenegro) Luka Malešević	1	0	0	1
Total				42	0	2	44

- Last updated: October 18, 2022
- Source: https://www.uslchampionship.com/rio-grande-valley-fc-player-stats

=== Disciplinary record ===
No.	Pos.	Player	USL Championship			USL Playoffs			U.S. Open Cup			Total		
No.	Pos.	Player	Yellow card	(yellow card) (yellow-red card)	Red card	Yellow card	(yellow card) (yellow-red card)	Red card	Yellow card	(yellow card) (yellow-red card)	Red card	Yellow card	(yellow card) (yellow-red card)	Red card
1	GK	(United States) Tyler Deric	2	0	0	0	0	0	0	0	0	2	0	0
2	DF	(Cuba) Daniel Luis	2	0	0	0	0	0	0	0	0	2	0	0
3	DF	(Ghana) Wahab Ackwei	4	0	0	0	0	0	0	0	0	4	0	0
4	DF	(Mexico) Erik Pimentel	8	0	1	0	0	0	0	0	0	8	0	1
5	MF	(Colombia) Juan Cabezas	7	0	0	0	0	0	0	0	0	7	0	0
6	MF	(United States) Isidro Martinez	4	0	0	0	0	0	0	0	0	4	0	0
7	MF	(Norway) Jonas Fjeldberg	1	0	0	0	0	0	0	0	0	1	0	0
8	MF	(United States) Emilio Ycaza	6	0	1	0	0	0	0	0	0	6	0	1
9	FW	(Cuba) Frank López	7	0	0	0	0	0	0	0	0	7	0	0
10	MF	(United States) José Torres	2	0	1	0	0	0	0	0	0	2	0	1
14	DF	(United States) Stefan Mueller	2	0	0	0	0	0	0	0	0	2	0	0
15	DF	(United States) Jesús Vázquez	4	0	0	0	0	0	0	0	0	4	0	0
17	MF	(United States) Ricky Ruiz	5	0	0	0	0	0	0	0	0	5	0	0
18	FW	(United States) Dylan Borczak	1	0	0	0	0	0	0	0	0	1	0	0
19	FW	(Mexico) Adolfo Hernández	2	0	0	0	0	0	0	0	0	2	0	0
20	DF	(United States) Jonathan Ricketts	6	0	0	0	0	0	1	0	0	7	0	0
21	DF	(United States) Robert Coronado	2	1	0	0	0	0	0	0	0	2	1	0
22	MF	(United States) Juan Torres	2	0	0	0	0	0	0	0	0	2	0	0
23	MF	(Cuba) Frank Nodarse	4	0	0	0	0	0	1	0	0	4	0	0
24	DF	(Montenegro) Luka Malešević	6	0	0	0	0	0	0	0	0	6	0	0
25	GK	(United States) Javier Garcia	1	0	0	0	0	0	0	0	0	1	0	0
29	MF	(Mexico) Christian Pinzón	1	0	0	0	0	0	0	0	0	1	0	0
31	DF	(United States) Akeem Ward	8	0	0	0	0	0	0	0	0	8	0	0
Total			82	1	3	0	0	0	2	0	0	84	1	3

- Last updated: October 18, 2022
- Source: https://www.uslchampionship.com/rio-grande-valley-fc-player-stats

== Awards and honors ==
=== USL Championship All League teams ===
Award	Awardee	Position	Ref
USL Championship All League Second Team	Wahab Ackwei	DF	
