= 2023 Rio Grande Valley FC season =

Rio Grande Valley FC Toros
2023 season
- Head coach: Wílmer Cabrera
- USL Championship: Western Conference: 9th
- USL Playoffs: DNQ
- U.S. Open Cup: 2nd Round
- Copa Tejas Division II: 2nd
- Copa Tejas Shield: 5th
- Top goalscorer: League: Wilmer Cabrera (7); All: Wilmer Cabrera (7)
- Highest home attendance: 6,494
- Lowest home attendance: 2,731
- Average home league attendance: 4,589
- Biggest win: RGV 5–2 El Paso Locomotive FC (7/29) (USLC)
- Biggest defeat: RGV 0–3 MEM (4/22) (USLC); RGV 0–3 TB (5/20) (USLC); TRM 2–1 RGV (4/5) (USOC)
Home colors	Away colors
- All statistics correct as of 19:15, October 16, 2023 (UTC).

The 2023 Rio Grande Valley FC Toros season was the final season for Rio Grande Valley FC Toros, and their 8th in USL Championship (USLC), the second-tier professional soccer league in the United States.

== Club ==
Note: Flags indicate national team as defined under FIFA eligibility rules; some limited exceptions apply. Players may hold more than one non-FIFA nationality. Squad correct as of March 12, 2023.

No.	Pos.	Nation	Player
1	GK	USA	Tyler Deric
2	MF	USA	Jonathan Ricketts
3	DF	GHA	Wahab Ackwei
4	DF	MEX	Erik Pimentel
5	MF	COL	Juan Cabezas
6	DF	VEN	Gabriel Benítez
7	MF	USA	Jose Torres
8	MF	USA	Taylor Davila
9	FW	CUB	Frank López
10	MF	MEX	Christian Pinzón
11	FW	COL	Juan Galindrez
12	MF	USA	Ricky Ruiz
13	FW	COL	Wilmer Cabrera
14	DF	USA	Michael Knapp
15	DF	CUB	Frank Nodarse
16	DF	USA	Robert Coronado
17	FW	USA	Ian Cerro
18	FW	USA	Duilio Herrera
19	DF	USA	Eric Kinzner
20	MF	USA	Tomás Ritondale
21	GK	USA	Carlos Merancio
22	MF	USA	Jose Luna
23	FW	HAI	Christiano François
24	FW	USA	Dylan Hernandez
25	DF	USA	Diego Rivera
29	FW	USA	Cole Frame

== Non-competitive fixtures ==
=== Preseason ===
February 18, 2023	Rio Grande Valley FC	5–1	UTRGV	Edinburg, Texas
		Report		Stadium: H-E-B Park

February 21, 2022	Houston Christian University	0–0	Rio Grande Valley FC	Houston, Texas
		Report

February 22, 2023	Houston Dynamo 2	0–1	Rio Grande Valley FC	Houston, Texas
		Report

February 28, 2023	Rio Grande Valley FC	1–0	Texas A&M International University	Edinburg, Texas
	Pimentel	Report		Stadium: H-E-B Park

March 4, 2023	Rio Grande Valley FC	2–1	Austin FC II	Edinburg, Texas
	Ruiz; François	Report		Stadium: H-E-B Park

== Competitions ==
=== USL Championship ===
==== Standings — Western Conference ====
Pos	Team	Pld	W	L	T	GF	GA	GD	Pts	Qualification
1	Sacramento Republic FC	34	18	6	10	51	26	+25	64	Playoffs
2	Orange County SC	34	17	11	6	46	39	+7	57	Playoffs
3	San Diego Loyal SC	34	16	9	9	61	43	+18	57	Playoffs
4	San Antonio FC	34	14	6	14	63	38	+25	56	Playoffs
5	Colorado Springs Switchbacks FC	34	16	13	5	49	42	+7	53	Playoffs
6	Phoenix Rising FC (C)	34	12	10	12	54	41	+13	48	Playoffs
7	El Paso Locomotive FC	34	13	13	8	41	51	−10	47	Playoffs
8	New Mexico United	34	13	14	7	51	49	+2	46	Playoffs
9	Rio Grande Valley FC Toros	34	10	11	13	43	48	−5	43	
10	Oakland Roots SC	34	11	14	9	45	48	−3	42	
11	Monterey Bay FC	34	11	15	8	42	53	−11	41	
12	Las Vegas Lights FC	34	3	21	10	36	66	−30	19	

Source: USL Championship Standings
Rules for classification: 1) head-to-head points; 2) head-to-head goal differential; 3) points-per game within conference; 4) total wins; 5) total goal differential; 6) total goals scored; 7) points earned against top four Conference finishers; 8) disciplinary points; 9) coin toss or drawing of lots
(C) Champions

==== Match results ====
March 12, 2023 1	Rio Grande Valley FC	1–1	Las Vegas Lights FC	Edinburg, Texas
7:00 pm CST	Ruiz 45+3'; Torres (yellow card) 80'; Pimental (red card) 90+2'	Report	Davila 4' (o.g.); Stauffer (yellow card) 47'; Torres (yellow card) 80' (yellow-red card) 90+6'	Stadium: H-E-B Park; Attendance: 6,329; Referee: Matthew Corrigan

March 19, 2023 2	Rio Grande Valley FC	1–1	Oakland Roots	Edinburg, Texas
7:00 pm CDT	Ricketts 14'; Coronado (yellow card) 90'; Kinzner (yellow card) 90+6'	Report	Barbir (yellow card) 54'; Nane (yellow card) 74'; Rodriguez 82'; Morad (yellow card) 90'; Tamacas (yellow card) 90+1'; Bailey (yellow card) 90+2'; Diaz (yellow card) 90+5'	Stadium: H-E-B Park; Attendance: 3,460; Referee: Malik Badawi

March 24, 2023 3	Rio Grande Valley FC	1–1	Monterey Bay FC	Edinburg, Texas
7:00 pm CDT	Nodarse (yellow card) 55'; Davila 90+1'; Pimental (red card) 90+1'; Ruiz (yellow card) 90+2'; Ritondale (yellow card) 90+3'	Report	Roberts (yellow card) 8'; Fehr (yellow card) 34' (yellow-red card) 71'; Dixon 62'; Ngnepi (yellow card) 90+2'	Stadium: H-E-B Park; Attendance: 5,014; Referee: Ricardo Fierro

April 1, 2023 4	Detroit City FC	0–1	Rio Grande Valley FC	Hamtramck, Michigan
3:00 pm EDT	Lehland (yellow card) 41'; Rodriguez (yellow card) 58'	Report	Nodarse (yellow card) 11'; Davila 23'; Ricketts (yellow card) 44'	Stadium: Keyworth Stadium; Attendance: 4,293; Referee: Adam Kilpatrick

April 15, 2023 5	Pittsburgh Riverhounds SC	2–0	Rio Grande Valley FC	Pittsburgh, Pennsylvania
6:00 pm EDT	Biasi (yellow card) 21'; Dikwa 49'; Forbes 64'; Dossantos (yellow card) 90'	Report	Cabezas (yellow card) 29'; Ricketts (yellow card) 43'	Stadium: Highmark Stadium; Attendance: 5,092; Referee: Sergii Demianchuk

April 22, 2023 6	Rio Grande Valley FC	0–3	Memphis 901 FC	Edinburg, Texas
7:00 pm CDT	Benítez (yellow card) 14'; Kinzner (yellow card) 45+2'	Report	Lapa 29'; Ward (yellow card) 55'; Smith 64', (yellow card) 74'; Glass (yellow card) 75'; Pickering 87'	Stadium: H-E-B Park; Attendance: 6,162; Referee: Gerald Flores

April 29, 2023 7	Monterey Bay FC	0–0	Rio Grande Valley FC	Seaside, California
9:00 pm PDT	Robinson (yellow card) 49'; Dixon (yellow card) 56'; Boone (yellow card) 63'	Report	Cabezas (yellow card) 57'; Ritondale (yellow card) 60'; Ruiz (yellow card) 85'	Stadium: Cardinale Stadium; Referee: Alexis Da Silva

May 5, 2023 8	Rio Grande Valley FC	2–2	New Mexico United	Edinburg, Texas
7:00 pm CDT	François 7', (yellow card) 45+2'; Cabrera 73'	Report	Ryden (yellow card) 9'; Prince (yellow card) 11'; Hamilton (yellow card) 20'; Moar (yellow card) 42'; Dolling (yellow card) 68'; Swartz 90+1'; Rivas 90+2'	Stadium: H-E-B Park; Attendance: 5,979; Referee: Greg Dopka

May 13, 2023 9	San Diego Loyal SC	2–3	Rio Grande Valley FC	San Diego, California
9:00 pm PDT	Perez 35'; Adams (yellow card) 61'; Corona 90+3' (pen.)	Report	Ricketts (yellow card) 19'; Coronado 26'; François 31'; Ruiz 39'; Davila (yellow card) 90+5'	Stadium: Torero Stadium; Attendance: 5,671; Referee: Brandon Stevis

May 20, 2023 10	Rio Grande Valley FC	0–3	Tampa Bay Rowdies	Edinburg, Texas
7:00 pm CDT	Ackwei (yellow card) 72'; Davila (yellow card) 75'; Benítez (yellow card) 77'; Cabrera (yellow card) 89'	Report	Ekra (yellow card) 13'; Kleemann (yellow card) 23'; Dennis 64' (pen.), 86'; Jennings 89'	Stadium: H-E-B Park; Attendance: 6,494; Referee: Ricardo Fierro

May 27, 2023 11	Rio Grande Valley FC	0–2	Charleston Battery	Edinburg, Texas
7:00 pm CDT	Benítez (yellow card) 51'; Nodarse (yellow card) 78'; Torres (yellow card) 88'	Report	Williams 30', 64' (pen.) #69 (yellow card) 90+3'	Stadium: H-E-B Park; Attendance: 4,991; Referee: Matthew Corrigan

June 3, 2023 12	Orange County SC	2–0	Rio Grande Valley FC	Irvine, California
9:00 pm PDT	M. Iloski 4'; Lambe (yellow card) 13'; Osundina 16'; Scott (yellow card) 45+2'; Pedersen (yellow card) 77'	Report	Davila (yellow card) 53'; Ruiz (yellow card) 75'	Stadium: Championship Soccer Stadium; Attendance: 4,268; Referee: Elvis Osmanovic

June 10, 2023 13	Rio Grande Valley FC	3–3	Miami FC	Edinburg, Texas
7:00 pm CDT	Pimentel (yellow card) 3'; Ruiz (yellow card) 19'; Davila (yellow card) 23'; Cabrera 38'; López 41'; Ackwei 90+7'	Report	Murphy 4' (pen.); Hernández (yellow card) 24'; Repetto 62'; Chapman-Page (yellow card) 68'; Telfer 78'	Stadium: H-E-B Park; Attendance: 5,560; Referee: Elton García

June 17, 2023 14	New Mexico United	2–2	Rio Grande Valley FC	Albuquerque, New Mexico
8:00 pm MDT	Portillo 38'; Bruce 43'; Ryden (yellow card) 63'; Seymore (yellow card) 90+1'; Swartz (yellow card) 90+4'	Report	Cabrera 28'; Benítez (yellow card) 45'; Cabrera (yellow card) 59'; Coronado (yellow card) 71'; Pinzón 86'	Stadium: Isotopes Park; Attendance: 10,057; Referee: Katja Koroleva

June 21, 2023 15	Rio Grande Valley FC	1–0	Colorado Springs Switchbacks FC	Edinburg, Texas
7:00 pm CDT	López 64', (yellow card) 90+8'; Davila (yellow card) 90+2'; Galindrez (yellow card) 90+8'	Report	Ågren (yellow card) 72'; Foster (yellow card) 88'	Stadium: H-E-B Park; Attendance: 3,088; Referee: Gerald Flores

June 28, 2023 16	Oakland Roots	0–2	Rio Grande Valley FC	Oakland, California
9:00 pm PDT	Prentice (yellow card) 9'; Reid (yellow card) 83'; Diaz (yellow card) 90' (yellow-red card) 90+2'	Report	Kinzner (yellow card) 39'; Benítez (yellow card) 38'; Cabrera 72', 80'; Pinzón (yellow card) 86'	Stadium: Laney College Football Stadium; Attendance: 2,838; Referee: DeShun Beard

July 1, 2023 17	Sacramento Republic FC	1–1	Rio Grande Valley FC	Sacramento, California
10:00 pm PDT	Keko (yellow card) 17'; Ross 48'; Sousa (yellow card) 72'; López (yellow card) 80'	Report	López (yellow card) 45'; Coronado (yellow card) 88'; Davila 90+6'	Stadium: Heart Health Park; Attendance: 9,106; Referee: Brad Jensen

July 9, 2023 18	Rio Grande Valley FC	2–0	Orange County SC	Edinburg, Texas
7:00 pm CDT	Ritondale (yellow card) 14'; Coranado (yellow card) 54'; Ackwei 69'; Ricketts 78'; Davila (yellow card) 84'	Report	Casiple (yellow card) 22'; M. Iloski (yellow card) 43'; B. Iloski (yellow card) 87'	Stadium: H-E-B Park; Attendance: 3,557; Referee: Nabil Bensalah

July 15, 2023 19 Copa Tejas	El Paso Locomotive FC	1–1	Rio Grande Valley FC	El Paso, Texas
8:30 pm MDT	Calvillo (yellow card) 22'; Solignac (yellow card) 66'; Zacarías (yellow card) 77'; Rose (yellow card) 80'; Gómez 88'; Navarro (yellow card) 90+6'	Report	Cabrera 38', (yellow card) 41'; Benítez (yellow card) 71'	Stadium: Southwest University Park; Attendance: 5,589; Referee: Abdou Ndiaye

July 21, 2023 20	FC Tulsa	2–1	Rio Grande Valley FC	Tulsa, Oklahoma
8:00 pm CDT	Yosef 7'; Tettah (yellow card) 23'; Goodrum 31' (pen.), (yellow card) 74'; Epps (yellow card) 57'; Malou (yellow card) 85'	Report	Nodarse (yellow card) 27' (yellow-red card) 29'; Davila (yellow card) 34'; Pimental (yellow card) 63'; Galindrez 74'; Coronado (red card) 83'; Achwei (yellow card) 83'	Stadium: Oneok Field; Attendance: 4,441; Referee: Elijio Arreguin

July 29, 2023 21 Copa Tejas	Rio Grande Valley FC	5–2	El Paso Locomotive FC	Edinburg, Texas
7:00 pm CDT	Davila 7', 20'; Calvillo 34' (o.g.); Cabrera 59'; Kinzner (yellow card) 70'; Torres 74' (pen.); López (yellow card) 86'	Report	Solignac 3' (pen.); Gómez 16', (yellow card) 51'; Zacarías (yellow card) 24'; Calvillo (yellow card) 40'	Stadium: H-E-B Park; Attendance: 4,730; Referee: Alejo Calume

August 5, 2023 22	Las Vegas Lights FC	2–1	Rio Grande Valley FC	Las Vegas, Nevada
9:30 pm PDT	Zali (yellow card) 17'; Etaka 28', 37'	Report	Cabezas (yellow card) 46'; Ruiz (yellow card) 58'; Pimentel 90'; Pinzón (yellow card) 90+4'	Stadium: Cashman Field; Attendance: 1,169; Referee: Brandon Stevis

August 12, 2023 23	Louisville City FC	2–2	Rio Grande Valley FC	Louisville, Kentucky
7:00 pm EDT	Perez (yellow card) 29'; Mares 42', (yellow card) 58'; Wynder 72'	Report	Cabezas 50'; Galindrez 80'; Ackwei (red card) 90+7'	Stadium: Lynn Family Stadium; Attendance: 10,678; Referee: Elton García

August 16, 2023 24 Copa Tejas	San Antonio FC	2–1	Rio Grande Valley FC	San Antonio, Texas
8:00 pm CDT	Patiño 13'; Zouhir 30'; Garcia (yellow card) 83'; Hayes (yellow card) 86'	Report	Cerro 11'	Stadium: Toyota Field; Attendance: 6,034; Referee: Sergii Boiko

August 19, 2023 25	Rio Grande Valley FC	1–0	Phoenix Rising FC	Edinburg, Texas
7:00 pm CDT	Galindrez 17'; Cabezas (yellow card) 43' (yellow-red card) 54+2'; Cabrera (yellow card) 90'; Torres (yellow card) 90+5'	Report	Ríos Novo (yellow card) 45+3'; Harvey (yellow card) 80'; Torres (yellow card) 90+2'	Stadium: H-E-B Park; Attendance: 3,320; Referee: Nabil Bensalah

August 26, 2023 26	Rio Grande Valley FC	2–3	San Diego Loyal SC	Edinburg, Texas
7:00 pm CDT	Nodarse (yellow card) 38'; Ricketts 49'; Pinzón 73' (pen.)	Report	Adams (yellow card) 16'; Damus 32'; Moshobane 34', 77'; Guzmán (yellow card) 55'; Corona (yellow card) 84'; Conway (yellow card) 90+4'	Stadium: H-E-B Park; Attendance: 3,006; Referee: Natalie Simon

August 30, 2023 27 Copa Tejas	Rio Grande Valley FC	0–0	San Antonio FC	Edinburg, Texas
7:00 pm CDT		Report		Stadium: H-E-B Park; Attendance: 2,731; Referee: Elvis Osmanovic

September 2, 2023 28	Phoenix Rising FC	2–0	Rio Grande Valley FC	Phoenix, Arizona
9:30 pm MST	Trejo 2'; Arteaga	Report		Stadium: Phoenix Rising Stadium; Attendance: 5,142; Referee: Melvin Rivas

September 9, 2023	Hartford Athletic	PP	Rio Grande Valley FC	Hartford, Connecticut
6:00 pm EDT		Report		Stadium: Trinity Health Stadium

September 17, 2023 29	Rio Grande Valley FC	1–0	Birmingham Legion FC	Edinburg, Texas
7:00 pm CDT	López 49'	Report		Stadium: H-E-B Park; Attendance: 3,705; Referee: Alexis Da Silva

September 24, 2023 30	Indy Eleven	0–1	Rio Grande Valley FC	Indianapolis, Indiana
4:00 pm EDT		Report	López 18'	Stadium: Michael A. Carroll Stadium; Attendance: 10,316; Referee: Thomas Snyder

September 30, 2023 31	Colorado Springs Switchbacks FC	1–1	Rio Grande Valley FC	Edinburg, Texas
9:00 pm CDT	Williams 69' (pen.)	Report	Davila 90+8'	Stadium: H-E-B Park; Attendance: 7,889; Referee: Olvin Oliva

October 4, 2023 32	Hartford Athletic	2–2	Rio Grande Valley FC	Hartford, Connecticut
7:00 pm EDT	Saydee 5', 35' (pen.)	Report	François 7'; Pinzón 25'	Stadium: Trinity Health Stadium; Attendance: 5,216; Referee: Joshua Encarnación

October 7, 2023 33	Rio Grande Valley FC	2–3	Sacramento Republic FC	Edinburg, Texas
7:00 pm CDT	López 10'; Knapp 44'	Report	Cicerone 36'; Felipe 45+3'; Archimède 68'	Stadium: H-E-B Park; Attendance: 3,969; Referee: Luis Arroyo

October 14, 2023 34	Rio Grande Valley FC	2–1	Loudoun United FC	Edinburg, Texas
7:00 pm CDT	Monis 74'; Cerro 90+2'	Report	Leggett 4'	Stadium: H-E-B Park; Attendance: 4,843; Referee: Melvin Rivas

=== U.S. Open Cup ===
April 5, 2022 Second Round	South Georgia Tormenta FC	2–1	Rio Grande Valley FC	Statesboro, Georgia
7:00 pm CT	Murphy 39'; Otieno (yellow card) 68'; Adjei 82'; Fonseca (yellow card) 90+4'	Report	Coronado (yellow card) 38'; Cabezas (yellow card) 50'; Ruiz (yellow card) 89', (goal) 90+1'	Stadium: Tormenta Stadium; Attendance: 1,139; Referee: William Hale

=== Statistics ===
Numbers after plus-sign(+) denote appearances as a substitute.

==== Appearances and goals ====
No.	Pos	Nat	Player	Total		USL Championship		Playoffs		U.S. Open Cup	
No.	Pos	Nat	Player	Apps	Goals	Apps	Goals	Apps	Goals	Apps	Goals
1	GK	(United States) USA	Tyler Deric	28	0	28+0	0	0+0	0	0+0	0
2	MF	(United States) USA	Jonathan Ricketts	29	2	25+3	2	0+0	0	1+0	0
3	DF	(Ghana) GHA	Wahab Ackwei	23	2	21+1	2	0+0	0	1+0	0
4	DF	(Mexico) MEX	Erik Pimentel	19	1	15+4	1	0+0	0	0+0	0
5	MF	(Colombia) COL	Juan Cabezas	26	1	23+2	1	0+0	0	1+0	0
6	DF	(Venezuela) VEN	Gabriel Benítez	25	0	20+4	0	0+0	0	1+0	0
7	MF	(United States) USA	José Torres	22	1	12+9	1	0+0	0	0+1	0
8	MF	(United States) USA	Taylor Davila	35	6	32+2	6	0+0	0	1+0	0
9	FW	(Cuba) CUB	Frank López	26	5	11+15	5	0+0	0	0+0	0
10	MF	(Mexico) MEX	Christian Pinzón	20	3	16+4	3	0+0	0	0+0	0
11	FW	(Colombia) COL	Juan Galindrez	20	3	7+13	3	0+0	0	0+0	0
12	MF	(United States) USA	Ricky Ruiz	30	3	22+7	2	0+0	0	0+1	1
13	FW	(United States) USA	Wilmer Cabrera	36	7	30+5	7	0+0	0	0+1	0
14	DF	(United States) USA	Michael Knapp	7	1	4+3	1	0+0	0	0+0	0
15	DF	(Cuba) CUB	Frank Nodarse	28	0	24+3	0	0+0	0	1+0	0
16	DF	(United States) USA	Robert Coronado	31	1	23+7	1	0+0	0	1+0	0
17	FW	(United States) USA	Ian Cerro	26	0	8+17	0	0+0	0	1+0	0
18	FW	(United States) USA	Duilio Herrera	10	0	2+8	0	0+0	0	0+0	0
19	DF	(United States) USA	Eric Kinzner	21	0	9+11	0	0+0	0	1+0	0
20	MF	(United States) USA	Tomás Ritondale	25	0	13+12	0	0+0	0	0+0	0
21	GK	(Mexico) MEX	Carlos Merancio	7	0	6+0	0	0+0	0	1+0	0
22	MF	(United States) USA	Jose Luna	5	0	0+4	0	0+0	0	0+1	0
23	FW	(Haiti) HAI	Christiano François	33	3	25+8	3	0+0	0	0+0	0
24	FW	(United States) USA	Dylan Hernandez	2	0	0+1	0	0+0	0	0+1	0
25	DF	(United States) USA	Diego Rivera	0	0	0+0	0	0+0	0	0+0	0
27			Orduy	1	0	0+1	0	0+0	0	0+0	0
29	FW	(United States) USA	Cole Frame	3	0	1+2	0	0+0	0	0+0	0
30	FW	(United States) USA	Alex Monis	6	0	5+1	0	0+0	0	0+0	0

- Last updated: October 14, 2023
- Source: https://www.uslchampionship.com/rio-grande-valley-fc-player-stats

=== Top scorers ===
Rank	Position	Number	Name	USL Championship	USL Playoffs	U.S. Open Cup	Total
1	FW	13	(Colombia) Wilmer Cabrera	7	0	0	7
2	MF	8	(United States) Taylor Davila	6	0	0	6
3	DF	9	(Cuba) Frank López	5	0	0	5
4	MF	10	(Mexico) Christian Pinzón	3	0	0	3
4	FW	11	(Colombia) Juan Galindrez	3	0	0	3
4	MF	12	(United States) Ricky Ruiz	2	0	1	3
4	FW	23	(Haiti) Christiano François	3	0	0	3
6	MF	2	(United States) Jonathan Ricketts	2	0	0	2
6	FW	17	(United States) Ian Cerro	2	0	0	2
9	DF	3	(Ghana) Wahab Ackwei	1	0	0	1
9	DF	4	(Mexico) Erik Pimentel	1	0	0	1
9	MF	5	(Colombia) Juan Cabezas	1	0	0	1
9	MF	7	(United States) José Torres	1	0	0	1
9	DF	14	(United States) Michael Knapp	1	0	0	1
9	DF	16	(United States) Robert Coronado	1	0	0	1
9	FW	30	(United States) Alex Monis	1	0	0	1
Total				42	0	1	43

- Last updated: October 14, 2023
- Source: https://www.uslchampionship.com/rio-grande-valley-fc-player-stats

=== Top assists ===
Rank	Position	Number	Name	USL Championship	USL Playoffs	U.S. Open Cup	Total
1	FW	15	(Haiti) Christiano François	5	0	0	5
2	MF	8	(United States) Taylor Davila	4	0	0	4
3	FW	13	(Colombia) Wilmer Cabrera	3	0	0	3
4	FW	9	(Cuba) Frank López	2	0	0	2
4	FW	11	(Colombia) Juan Galindrez	2	0	0	2
4	FW	20	(United States) Tomás Ritondale	2	0	0	2
4	FW	17	(United States) Ian Cerro	2	0	0	2
4	FW	23	(Cuba) Frank Nodarse	2	0	0	2
7	MF	2	(United States) Jonathan Ricketts	1	0	0	1
7	MF	5	(Colombia) Juan Cabezas	1	0	0	1
7	MF	10	(Mexico) Christian Pinzón	1	0	0	1
7	MF	12	(United States) Ricky Ruiz	1	0	0	1
7	DF	16	(United States) Robert Coronado	1	0	0	1
7	MF	22	(United States) Jose Luna	0	0	1	1
Total				27	0	1	28

- Last updated: October 14, 2023
- Source: https://www.uslchampionship.com/rio-grande-valley-fc-player-stats

=== Disciplinary record ===
No.	Pos.	Player	USL Championship			USL Playoffs			U.S. Open Cup			Total		
No.	Pos.	Player	Booked	(yellow card) (yellow-red card)	Sent off (straight red)	Booked	(yellow card) (yellow-red card)	Sent off (straight red)	Booked	(yellow card) (yellow-red card)	Sent off (straight red)	Booked	(yellow card) (yellow-red card)	Sent off (straight red)
1	GK	(United States) Tyler Deric	1	0	0	0	0	0	0	0	0	1	0	0
2	MF	(United States) Jonathan Ricketts	7	0	0	0	0	0	0	0	0	7	0	0
3	DF	(Ghana) Wahab Ackwei	2	0	1	0	0	0	0	0	0	2	0	1
4	DF	(Mexico) Erik Pimentel	2	0	2	0	0	0	0	0	0	2	0	2
5	MF	(Colombia) Juan Cabezas	4	1	0	0	0	0	1	0	0	5	1	0
6	DF	(Venezuela) Gabriel Benítez	8	0	0	0	0	0	0	0	0	8	0	0
7	MF	(Colombia) José Torres	4	0	0	0	0	0	0	0	0	4	0	0
8	MF	(United States) Taylor Davila	7	0	0	0	0	0	0	0	0	7	0	0
9	FW	(Cuba) Frank López	4	1	0	0	0	0	0	0	0	4	1	0
10	MF	(Mexico) Christian Pinzón	3	0	0	0	0	0	0	0	0	3	0	0
11	FW	(Colombia) Juan Galindrez	1	0	0	0	0	0	0	0	0	1	0	0
12	MF	(United States) Ricky Ruiz	7	0	0	0	0	0	1	0	0	8	0	0
13	FW	(Colombia) Wilmer Cabrera	2	0	0	0	0	0	0	0	0	2	0	0
14	DF	(United States) Michael Knapp	1	0	0	0	0	0	0	0	0	1	0	0
15	MF	(Cuba) Frank Nodarse	6	1	0	0	0	0	0	0	0	6	1	0
16	DF	(United States) Robert Coronado	5	0	1	0	0	1	0	0	0	6	0	1
17	FW	(United States) Ian Cerro	1	0	0	0	0	0	0	0	0	1	0	0
18	FW	(United States) Duilio Herrera	0	0	0	0	0	0	0	0	0	0	0	0
19	DF	(United States) Eric Kinzner	4	0	0	0	0	0	0	0	0	4	0	0
20	MF	(United States) Tomás Ritondale	3	0	0	0	0	0	0	0	0	3	0	0
21	GK	(United States) Carlos Merancio	0	0	0	0	0	0	0	0	0	0	0	0
22	MF	(United States) Jose Luna	0	0	0	0	0	0	0	0	0	0	0	0
23	FW	(Haiti) Christiano François	1	0	0	0	0	0	0	0	0	1	0	0
24	FW	(United States) Dylan Hernandez	0	0	0	0	0	0	0	0	0	0	0	0
25	DF	(United States) Diego Rivera	0	0	0	0	0	0	0	0	0	0	0	0
	Coach	(Colombia) Wílmer Cabrera	2	0	0	0	0	0	0	0	0	2	0	0
Total			70	3	4	0	0	0	3	0	0	73	3	4

- Last updated: October 14, 2023
- Source: https://www.uslchampionship.com/rio-grande-valley-fc-player-stats

== Awards and honors ==
=== USL Championship All League ===
Team	Player	Position	Ref
First Team	(United States) Taylor Davila	MF	

=== USL Championship Team of the Week ===
Week	Player	Opponent	Position	Ref
2	(United States) Jonathan Ricketts	Oakland Roots	MF	
3	(United States) Taylor Davila	Monterey Bay FC	MF	
4	(United States) Taylor Davila (2)	Detroit City FC	MF	
8	(United States) Jonathan Ricketts (2)	Monterey Bay FC	MF	
10	(United States) Ricky Ruiz	San Diego Loyal SC	MF	
18	(Ghana) Wahab Ackwei	Orange County SC	DF	
18	(United States) Jonathan Ricketts (3)	Orange County SC	MF	
21	(United States) Taylor Davila (3)	El Paso Locomotive FC	MF	
23	(Colombia) Juan Cabezas	Louisville City FC	MF	
29	(United States) Taylor Davila (4)	Indy Eleven	MF	
32	(United States) Jonathan Ricketts (4)	Loudoun United FC	Bench	
