= 2024 El Paso Locomotive FC season =

El Paso Locomotive FC
2024 season
- Head coach: Brian Clarhaut
- Stadium: Southwest University Park, El Paso, TX
- USL: Western Conference: 12th
- 2024 U.S. Open Cup: Third Round
- Copa Tejas Division II: 1st
- Copa Tejas Shield: 5th
- Top goalscorer: League: Amando Moreno (6); All: Amando Moreno (6)
- Highest home attendance: 7,067
- Lowest home attendance: 4,014
- Average home league attendance: 5,875
- Biggest win: LDN 0–2 ELP (USLC) (5/10)
- Biggest defeat: RI 3–0 ELP (USLC) (6/28); OMA 0–0 (5–3 p) ELP (USOC) (4/17)
Home colors	Away colors
- All statistics correct as of 15:17, November 3, 2024 (UTC).

The 2024 El Paso Locomotive FC season was the sixth season for El Paso Locomotive FC in the USL Championship, the second tier of professional soccer in the United States and Canada.

== Staff ==
After a 1–8–2 record in their first eleven games, the team announced they had parted ways with head coach Brian Clarhaut and assistant coach Jon Burklo. On May 20, El Paso Locomotive FC announced they had appointed Wílmer Cabrera as their new coach.

As of September 21, 2024

Position	Name
Head coach	(Colombia) Wílmer Cabrera
Assistant coach	(United States) Ray Saari
Assistant coach	(United States) Gianluca Masucci
Assistant coach	(Colombia) Gerson Echeverry
Goalkeeping coach	(United States) Matt Dabrowski
Coordinator, equipment and player operations	(United States) Saul Soto

== Roster ==
As of October 8, 2024

No.	Pos.	Player	Nation
1	GK	MEX	Ramón Pasquel
2	DF	USA	Brandan Craig
3	DF	GHA	Wahab Ackwei
4	DF	USA	Lucas Stauffer
5	DF	MEX	Éder Borelli
6	MF	SLV	Eric Calvillo
7	FW	SLV	Joaquín Rivas
8	FW	MEX	Amaury Escoto
9	FW	GER	Malik McLemore
10	FW	SLV	Amando Moreno
12	FW	COL	Wilmar Rivas
13	GK	USA	Javier Garcia
14	DF	URU	Gonzalo Pelua
15	DF	USA	Noah Dollenmayer
16	DF	USA	Miles Lyons
17	FW	USA	Ricardo Zacarías
18	FW	RSA	Tumi Moshobane
19	MF	USA	Arun Basuljevic
19	FW	COL	Wilmer Cabrera
21	DF	NGA	Bolu Akinyode
23	GK	JAM	Jahmali Waite
24	DF	ESP	Yuma
25	DF	MEX	Arturo Ortiz
27	MF	SWE	Petar Petrović
30	MF	USA	Robert Coronado
31	DF	USA	Nick Hinds
33	MF	USA	Ricky Ruiz
50	FW	USA	Axel Valdivia
51	MF	USA	Alejandro Estrada
53	DF	USA	Finnley O'Brien
54	GK	USA	Santiago Vargas
58	FW	USA	Mario Rodriguez
93	DF	MEX	Tony Alfaro
99	DF	MEX	Francisco Nevárez
—	FW	MEX	Emiliano Rodriguez
—	DF	GER	Dennis Erdmann
—	FW	USA	Andy Cabrera
—	FW	USA	Justin Dhillon
—	MF	USA	Luis Moreno

== Transfers ==
=== In ===
Date	No.	Pos.	Player	From	Fee	Source
November 2, 2023	3	MF	(United States) Elijah Martin	(United States) San Diego Loyal	Free agent	
November 6, 2023	21	DF	(Nigeria) Bolu Akinyode	(United States) Miami FC	Free agent	
November 8, 2023	10	FW	(El Salvador) Amando Moreno	(United States) New Mexico United	Free agent	
November 20, 2023	11	FW	(El Salvador) Joaquin Rivas	(United States) Miami FC	Free agent	
December 1, 2023	15	DF	(United States) Noah Dollenmayer	(United States) LAFC2	Undisclosed	
December 7, 2023	9	FW	(United States) Justin Dhillon	(United States) San Antonio FC	Undisclosed	
December 13, 2023	18	FW	(South Africa) Tumi Moshobane	(United States) San Diego Loyal SC	Free agent	
December 18, 2023	93	DF	(Mexico) Tony Alfaro	(United States) LA Galaxy	Free agent	
January 4, 2024	23	GK	(Jamaica) Jahmali Waite	(United States) Pittsburgh Riverhounds SC	Undisclosed	
January 10, 2024	4	DF	(United States) Lucas Stauffer	(United States) Las Vegas Lights	Free agent	
January 12, 2024	5	DF	(Mexico) Éder Borelli	(United States) El Paso Locomotive FC	Contract renewal	
June 24, 2024		FW	(Mexico) Emiliano Rodriguez	(United States) El Paso Locomotive FC Academy	Home grown	
July 17, 2024	33	MF	(United States) Ricky Ruiz	(United States) Chattanooga Red Wolves SC	Undisclosed	
July 19, 2024	30	DF	(United States) Robert Coronado	(United States) Central Valley Fuego FC	Undisclosed	
July 31, 2024		DF	(Germany) Dennis Erdmann	(United States) Colorado Springs Switchbacks FC	Undisclosed	
July 31, 2024		DF	(Ghana) Wahab Ackwei	(United States) Colorado Springs Switchbacks FC	Traded for Justin Dhillon	
August 2, 2024		FW	(United States) Andy Cabrera		Free Agent signed for 25 days	
September 16, 2024		FW	(Germany) Malik McLemore	(Germany) FSV Frankfurt		

=== Loans in ===
No.	Pos.	Player	Loaned from	Start	End	Source
2	DF	(United States) Brandan Craig	(United States) Philadelphia Union	February 15, 2024	December 31, 2024	
1	GK	(Mexico) Ramón Pasquel	(Mexico) FC Juárez	February 21, 2024	December 31, 2024	
14	DF	(Uruguay) Gonzalo Pelua	(Mexico) FC Juárez	February 26, 2024	December 31, 2024	
99	MF	(Mexico) Francisco Nevárez	(Mexico) FC Juárez	February 26, 2024	December 31, 2024	
	MF	(El Salvador) Jeremy Garay	(United States) D.C. United	March 13, 2024	June 27, 2024	
	MF	(United States) Stiven Rivas	(Colombia) Real Cartagena	July 17, 2024	December 31, 2024	

=== Out ===
Date	No.	Pos.	Player	To	Fee	Source
November 1, 2023	2	DF	(Spain) Marc Navarro	Free agent	N/A	
November 1, 2023	23	DF	(Spain) José Carrillo	Free agent	N/A	
November 1, 2023	21	FW	(England) Emmanuel Sonupe	Free agent	N/A	
November 1, 2023	29	FW	(Faroe Islands) Petur Knudsen	Free agent	N/A	
November 1, 2023	88	MF	(United States) Joel Maldonado	Free agent	N/A	
December 21, 2023	4	DF	(Sweden) Erik McCue	(Sweden) Örebro SK	Free	
January 1, 2024	10	MF	(Ukraine) Denys Kostyshyn	(Ukraine) FC Oleksandriya	Free	
December 12, 2023	9	FW	(Argentina) Luis Solignac	(United States) San Antonio FC	Undisclosed	
January 30, 2024	7	FW	(Mexico) Aarón Gómez	(United States) Union Omaha	Free	
June 17, 2024	3	DF	(United States) Elijah Martin		Mutual Agreement	
June 17, 2024	77	MF	(United States) Diego Abarca	(United States) Austin FC II	Mutual Agreement	
June 18, 2024	22	MF	(Australia) Liam Rose	(Australia) Macarthur FC	Mutual Agreement	
August 8, 2024	9	FW	(United States) Justin Dhillon	(United States) Colorado Springs Switchbacks FC	Trade for Wahab Ackwei	
August 12, 2024	27	MF	(Sweden) Petar Petrović	(Sweden) Östers IF		

=== Loan out ===
No.	Pos.	Player	Loaned to	Start	End	Source
11	FW	(United States) Christopher Garcia	(United States) Austin FC II	January 11, 2024	December 31, 2023	

=== New contracts ===
Date	Pos.	No.	Player	Contract until	Ref.
October 30, 2023	MF	27	(Sweden) Petar Petrović	2024	
November 13, 2023	MF	19	(United States) Arun Basuljevic	2024	
November 15, 2023	MF	11	(United States) Christopher Garcia	2024	
November 15, 2023	MF	77	(United States) Diego Abarca	2024	
November 15, 2023	MF	8	(United States) Luis Moreno	2024	
November 15, 2023	DF	31	(United States) Nick Hinds	2024	
November 15, 2023	GK	13	(United States) Javier Garcia	2024	
August 30, 2024	FW	27	(United States) Andy Cabrera	2024	

== Non-competitive fixtures ==
=== Preseason ===
El Paso Locomotive announced their 2024 preseason schedule on January 16, 2024.

February 3	El Paso Locomotive	3–0	El Paso Locomotive U-20	El Paso, Texas
		Report		Stadium: Westside Soccer Complex

February 7	El Paso Locomotive	0–2	Louisville City	Tucson, Arizona
		Report	Serrano 57'; McCabe 62'	Stadium: Kino Sports Complex

February 15	El Paso Locomotive	0–1	Detroit City	Tucson, Arizona
		Report	Matthews	Stadium: Kino Sports Complex

February 24	El Paso Locomotive	v	Barça Residency Academy	El Paso, Texas

March 2	El Paso Locomotive	3–0	New Mexico United	El Paso, Texas
	Dhillon; A. Moreno; Zacarías	Report

=== Midseason ===
March 20	El Paso Locomotive (United States)	0–3	(Mexico) FC Juárez	El Paso, Texas
7:30 pm (MST)		Report	García 46'; Zapata 67'; Escoto 77'	Stadium: Southwest University Park; Attendance: 8,372

== Competitive fixtures ==
=== USL Championship ===
==== Standings — Western Conference ====
Pos	Team	Pld	W	L	T	GF	GA	GD	Pts	Qualification
1	New Mexico United	34	18	11	5	46	44	+2	59	Playoffs
2	Colorado Springs Switchbacks FC (C)	34	15	12	7	48	40	+8	52	Playoffs
3	Memphis 901 FC	34	14	11	9	52	41	+11	51	Playoffs
4	Las Vegas Lights FC	34	13	10	11	49	46	+3	50	Playoffs
5	Sacramento Republic FC	34	13	11	10	46	34	+12	49	Playoffs
6	Orange County SC	34	13	14	7	38	45	−7	46	Playoffs
7	Oakland Roots SC	34	13	16	5	37	57	−20	44	Playoffs
8	Phoenix Rising FC	34	11	14	9	33	39	−6	42	Playoffs
9	San Antonio FC	34	10	15	9	36	49	−13	39	
10	FC Tulsa	34	9	14	11	33	48	−15	38	
11	Monterey Bay FC	34	8	16	10	29	44	−15	34	
12	El Paso Locomotive FC	34	8	18	8	27	46	−19	32	

Source: USL Championship Standings
Rules for classification: 1) head-to-head points; 2) head-to-head goal differential; 3) points-per game within conference; 4) total wins; 5) total goal differential; 6) total goals scored; 7) points earned against top four Conference finishers; 8) disciplinary points; 9) coin toss or drawing of lots
(C) Champions

==== Match results ====
Matchday	Date	Opponent	Venue	Location	Result	Scorers	Attendance	Referee	Position
1	March 9	Hartford Athletic	Southwest University Park	El Paso, Texas	0–1		6,111	Brandon Stevis	10th Western Conf.
2	March 13	Monterey Bay FC	Southwest University Park	El Paso, Texas	1–1	Moreno 4'	4,566	Brad Jensen	7th Western Conf.
3	March 16	Louisville City FC	Southwest University Park	El Paso, Texas	0–1		4,876	Abdou Ndiaye	9th Western Conf.
4	March 23	Las Vegas Lights FC	Cashman Park	Las Vegas, Nevada	0–1		1,070	Thomas Snyder	11th Western Conf.
5	April 6	New Mexico United	Isotopes Park	Albuquerque, New Mexico	2–3	Rivas 81'; Moreno (pen.) 87'	9,019	Matthew Thompson	11th Western Conf.
6	April 13	Oakland Roots SC	Southwest University Park	El Paso, Texas	2–3	Moreno 13'; Dhillon (pen.) 43'	6,667	Sergii Demianchuk	11th Western Conf.
7	April 20	Tampa Bay Rowdies	Al Lang Stadium	Tampa Bay, Florida	1–1	Nevárez 64'	4,945	Alex Beehler	11th Western Conf.
8	April 27	FC Tulsa	Southwest University Park	El Paso, Texas	0–1		6,142	Lorenzo Hernandez	12th Western Conf.
9	May 4	Colorado Springs Switchbacks FC	Weidner Field	Colorado Springs, Colorado	0–2		8,023	Luis Arroyo	12th Western Conf.
10	May 10	Loudoun United FC	Segra Field	Leesburg, Virginia	2–0	Tumi 1 Calvillo 40'	1,836	Velimir Stefanovic	12th Western Conf.
11	May 17	Memphis 901 FC	Southwest University Park	El Paso, Texas	1–2		6,004	Abdou Ndiaye	12th Western Conf.
12	May 24	Charleston Battery	Patriots Point	Mount Pleasant, South Carolina	2–1	Moreno 69', 90+2'	3,257	Alejo Calume	12th Western Conf.
13	June 1	Birmingham Legion FC	Southwest University Park	El Paso, Texas	1–3	Dhillon 44'	5,707	John Matto	12th Western Conf.
14	June 5 Copa Tejas	San Antonio FC	Toyota Field	San Antonio, Texas	1–0	Craig 65'	5,805	Ricardo Fierro	12; Western Conf.
15	June 15	Phoenix Rising FC	Southwest University Park	El Paso, Texas	1–1	Calvillo 13'	5,802	Elijio Arreguin	12; Western Conf.
16	June 19	Oakland Roots SC	Pioneer Stadium	Hayward, California	1–2	Dhillon 5'	3,247	Trevor Wiseman	12th Western Conf.
17	June 26	Rhode Island FC	Beirne Stadium	Smithfield, Rhode Island	0–3		3,481	Nabil Bensalah	12th Western Conf.
18	July 12	Las Vegas Lights FC	Southwest University Park	El Paso, Texas	0–2		6,727	Servando Berna Rico	12th Western Conf.
19	July 19	Phoenix Rising FC	Phoenix Rising Soccer Stadium	Phoenix, Arizona	0–2		6,544	Elton García	12th Western Conf.
20	July 27	New Mexico United	Southwest University Park	El Paso, Texas	1–2	Nevárez 21'	5,577	Elijio Arreguin	12th Western Conf.
21	August 3	Memphis 901 FC	AutoZone Park	Memphis, Tennessee	0–0		2,714	Thomas Snyder	12th Western Conf.
22	August 10	Miami FC	Southwest University Park	El Paso, Texas	2–1	Coronado 45+1'; Moreno 66'	7,067	Katja Koroleva	12th Western Conf.
23	August 14	Sacramento Republic FC	Heart Health Park	Sacramento, California	0–2		8,688	Trevor Wiseman	12th Western Conf.
24	August 17	Orange County SC	Championship Soccer Stadium	Irvine, California	1–0	Calvillo 64' (p)	4,001	Abdou Ndiaye	12th Western Conf.
25	August 24	Monterey Bay FC	Cardinale Stadium	Seaside, California	0–0		5,199	Benjamin Meyer	12th Western Conf.
26	September 7	Detroit City FC	Southwest University Park	El Paso, Texas	0–0		5,764	Luis Arroyo	12th Western Conf.
27	September 14	Indy Eleven	Michael A. Carroll Stadium	Indianapolis, Indiana	1–3	Zacarías 83'	10,132	Sergii Demianchuk	12th Western Conf.
28	September 21	Colorado Springs Switchbacks FC	Southwest University Park	El Paso, Texas	1–1	Ruiz 51'	5,422	Nabil Bensalah	12th Western Conf.
29	September 28	North Carolina FC	Southwest University Park	El Paso, Texas	1–0	Rivas 90+2' (p)	4,014	Muhammad Hassan	12th Western Conf.
30	October 5	FC Tulsa	ONEOK Field	Tulsa, Oklahoma	1–0	Coronado 20'	3,092	Jeremy Scheer	12th Western Conf.
31	October 9 Copa Tejas	San Antonio FC	Southwest University Park	El Paso, Texas	2–2	Own goal 83'; Lyons 88'	6,004	Servando Berna Rico	12th Western Conf.
32	October 16	Orange County SC	Southwest University Park	El Paso, Texas	0–2		6,004	Brandon Stevis	12th Western Conf.
33	October 19	Sacramento Republic FC	Southwest University Park	El Paso, Texas	2–1	Stauffer 26'; Alfaro 32' (p)	6,376	Joe Surgan	12th Western Conf.
34	October 26	Pittsburgh Riverhounds SC	Highmark Stadium	Pittsburgh, Pennsylvania	0–2		5,738	Matthew Corrigan	12th Western Conf.

=== U.S. Open Cup ===
Round	Date	Opponent	Venue	Location	Result	Scorers	Attendance	Referee
Third Round	April 17	(Nebraska) Union Omaha	Werner Park	Omaha, Nebraska	0–0 (3–5 p)			Abdu Razzaq Juma

== Awards and honors ==
=== USL Championship Team of the Matchday ===
Matchday	Player	Opponent	Position	Ref
1	(United States) Lucas Stauffer	Hartford Athletic	DF	
10	(El Salvador) Eric Calvillo	Loudoun United FC	MF	
10	(Nigeria) Bolu Akinyode	Loudoun United FC	MF	
10	(South Africa) Tumi Moshobane	Loudoun United FC	FW	
10	(Jamaica) Jahmali Waite	Loudoun United FC	Bench	
12	(El Salvador) Amando Moreno	Charleston Battery	FW	
12	(United States) Lucas Stauffer (2)	Charleston Battery	DF	
22	(Jamaica) Jahmali Waite (2)	Memphis 901 FC	GK	
23	(United States) Robert Coronado	Miami FC	MF	
23	(United States) Lucas Stauffer (3)	Miami FC	DF	
23	(El Salvador) Amando Moreno	Miami FC	Bench	
24	(El Salvador) Eric Calvillo (2)	Orange County SC	MF	
27	(Mexico) Ramón Pasquel	Detroit City FC	GK	
30	(Mexico) Arturo Ortiz	North Carolina FC	DF	
31	(Mexico) Tony Alfaro	FC Tulsa	Bench	
33	(Mexico) Tony Alfaro (2)	Sacramento Republic FC	DF	
33	(United States) Lucas Stauffer (4)	Sacramento Republic FC	Bench	

=== Player of the Matchday ===
Matchday	Player	Opponent	Ref
12	(El Salvador) Amando Moreno	Charleston Battery	

=== Save of the Matchday ===
Matchday	Player	Opponent	Ref
1	(Jamaica) Jahmali Waite	Hartford Athletic	
3	(United States) Javier Garcia	Las Vegas Lights FC	
7	(Jamaica) Jahmali Waite (2)	Tampa Bay Rowdies	
20	(Jamaica) Jahmali Waite (3)	Phoenix Rising FC	
21	(Jamaica) Jahmali Waite (4)	New Mexico United	
22	(Jamaica) Jahmali Waite (5)	Memphis 901 FC	
24	(Jamaica) Jahmali Waite (6)	Orange County SC	
28	(Jamaica) Jahmali Waite (7)	Indy Eleven	
