= Wahab Ackwei =

Ghanaian footballer (born 1996)

Personal information
- Date of birth: 19 October 1996 (age 30)
- Place of birth: Accra, Ghana
- Height: 1.83 m (6 ft 0 in)
- Position: Defender

Team information
- Current team: Sporting JAX

Senior career*
Years	Team	Apps	(Gls)
2015–2017	Inter Allies	56	(3)
2018	New York Red Bulls II	7	(0)
2019–2020	Richmond Kickers	38	(0)
2021	Loudoun United	9	(0)
2022–2023	Rio Grande Valley FC	55	(4)
2024	Colorado Springs Switchbacks	5	(1)
2024–2025	El Paso Locomotive	30	(2)
2026–	Sporting JAX	16	(0)
- * Club domestic league appearances and goals as of 22:58, 31 October 2026 (UTC)

Wahab Ackwei (born 19 October 1996) is a Ghanaian professional footballer who plays as a defender for USL Championship club Sporting JAX.

== Career ==
=== Inter Allies ===
Ackwei made his debut in Ghanaian professional football during the 2015 season with Inter Allies FC in the Ghanaian Division One. Ackwei scored his first goal for Inter Allies on 20 March 2017 in a 1–0 victory over Tema Youth F.C. On 28 June 2017 he scored the loan goal for Inter Allies in a 1–0 victory over Bechem United. On 8 October 2017 Ackwei scored his team's opening goal from the penalty spot in a 2–0 victory over Medeama S.C. At the conclusion of the 2017 season in which he scored 3 goals in 23 appearances it was reported that clubs from Europe and Major League Soccer were in pursuit of the defender.

Ackwei played at the club for three years before leaving at the expiration of his contract during December 2017. After leaving Inter Allies, it was reported that Ackwei had an offer from Accra Hearts of Oak after a deal with Danish club Viborg FF failed to materialize.

=== New York Red Bulls II ===
On 14 February 2018 it was announced that Ackwei had signed with New York Red Bulls II.

=== Richmond Kickers ===
In March 2019, the Richmond Kickers signed Ackwei.

=== Loudoun United ===
Ackwei signed with Loudoun United on 11 February 2021.

=== Rio Grande Valley FC ===
On 11 February 2022, Ackwei moved to USL Championship side Rio Grande Valley FC. On May 5, 2022, Ackwei scored his first goal for RGV during a 3–2 loss to Colorado Springs Switchbacks FC.

=== Colorado Springs Switchbacks ===
Following Rio Grande Valley folding Ackewi moved to Colorado Springs Switchbacks ahead of their 2024 season.

=== El Paso Locomotive ===
In August 2024, Ackwei was traded to El Paso Locomotive in exchange for Justin Dhillon.

=== Sporting JAX ===
On 27 January 2026, USL Championship expansion club Sporting Club Jacksonville, better known as Sporting JAX, announced the addition of Ackwei to their inaugural roster.

== Career statistics ==
As of 25 October 2025

Club	Season	League			Cup (Note: Appearance in the U.S. Open Cup)		Continental		Other		Total	
Club	Season	Division	Apps	Goals	Apps	Goals	Apps	Goals	Apps	Goals	Apps	Goals
Inter Allies	2015	Ghana Premier League	12	0	0	0	–		–		12	0
Inter Allies	2016	Ghana Premier League	21	0	0	0	–		–		21	0
Inter Allies	2017	Ghana Premier League	23	3	0	0	–		–		23	3
Inter Allies	Total		56	3	0	0	0	0	0	0	56	3
New York Red Bulls II	2018	USL	7	0	–		–		0	0	7	0
Richmond Kickers	2019	USL League One	25	0	1	1	–		0	0	26	1
Richmond Kickers	2020	USL League One	13	0	0	0	–		0	0	13	0
Richmond Kickers	Total		38	0	1	1	0	0	0	0	39	1
Loudoun United FC	2021	USL Championship	9	0	0	0	–		0	0	9	0
Rio Grande Valley FC Toros	2022	USL Championship	31	2	2	0	–		0	0	15	1
Rio Grande Valley FC Toros	2023	USL Championship	23	2	1	0	–		0	0	24	2
Rio Grande Valley FC Toros	Total		63	4	3	0	0	0	0	0	65	4
Colorado Springs Switchbacks FC	2024	USL Championship	5	1	1	0	–		0	0	6	1
Colorado Springs Switchbacks FC	Total		5	1	1	0	0	0	0	0	6	1
El Paso Locomotive FC	2024	USL Championship	9	0	0	0	–		0	0	9	0
El Paso Locomotive FC	2025	USL Championship	21	2	2	0	–		1 (Note: Includes appearance in USL Cup)	0	24	2
El Paso Locomotive FC	Total		30	2	2	0	0	0	1	0	33	2
Career total			192	10	7	1	0	0	1	0	200	11

== Honours ==
Individual

- USL Championship All League Second Team: 2022
