= Tyler Deric =

American soccer player (born 1988)

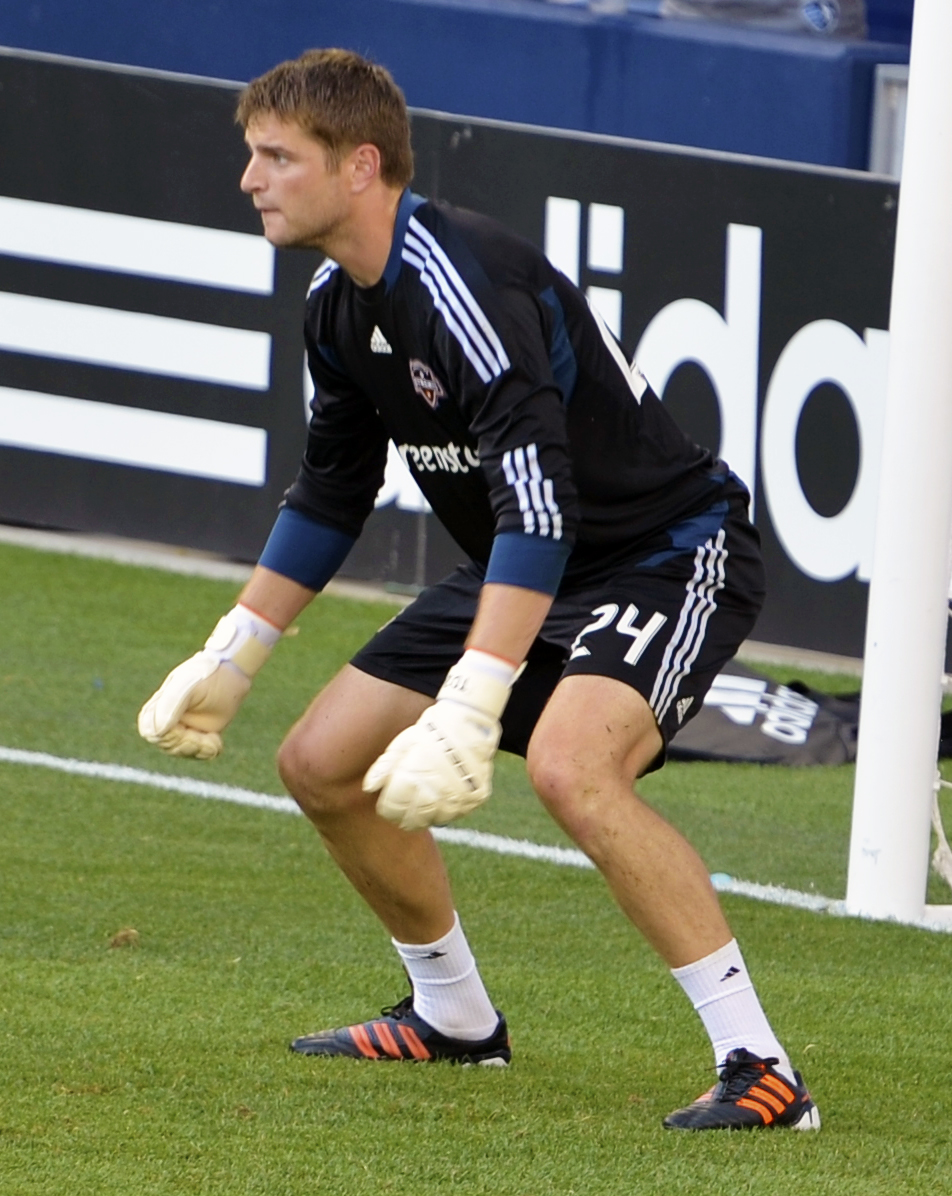
- Deric in 2012

Personal information
- Full name: John Tyler Deric
- Date of birth: August 30, 1988 (age 38)
- Place of birth: Spring, Texas, United States
- Height: 6 ft 3 in (1.91 m)
- Position: Goalkeeper

Youth career
- 2007–2009: Houston Dynamo

College career
Years	Team	Apps	(Gls)
2007	North Carolina Tar Heels		

Senior career*
Years	Team	Apps	(Gls)
2009–2019	Houston Dynamo	90	(0)
2009	→ Austin Aztex (loan)	0	(0)
2012	→ San Antonio Scorpions (loan)	1	(0)
2016–2019	→ Rio Grande Valley FC (loan)	13	(0)
2021–2023	Rio Grande Valley FC	79	(0)
2024	Memphis 901	27	(0)
2025	FC Tulsa	2	(0)
Total		212	(0)
- * Club domestic league appearances and goals as of 31 October 2025

John Tyler Deric (born August 30, 1988) is a former American soccer player who played as a goalkeeper.

== Early career ==
Deric was coached by Scot Dymond at Texans SC during his youth career. Deric spent his high school years at Klein High School in Spring, Texas. There, Deric lead the Bearkats to a UIL 5A state championship in 2005 and received the honor of being named to the All-Tournament team as a sophomore in high school. His successful 2005 season came with a call up to the Texas ODP team. Deric was named, along with 49 other players, as the top 50 players to watch in the graduating class of 2007 by Top Drawer Soccer. In addition to his career at Klein High School, Deric joined the Houston Dynamo Academy on January 24, 2007. Deric soon gathered the attention of academy coach James Clarkson and Dynamo head coach Dominic Kinnear preceding his participation in the Dynamo Trials in 2008.

Deric attended the University of North Carolina from 2007 to 2008. During his time at UNC, he was awarded the Atlantic Coast Conference All-Freshman Honors after having started 17 out of the 20 games as a freshman. Deric had a .94 goals against average in his first year along with 48 saves and six clean sheets.

== Professional career ==
=== Houston Dynamo ===
Deric became the first home grown player to be promoted from the Dynamo's developmental academy (and the second ever to do so in MLS after Tristan Bowen of Los Angeles Galaxy) when he signed a professional development contract with Houston on February 27, 2009. As the third-string goalkeeper, behind Tally Hall and Pat Onstad, Deric saw no playing time in games. Deric was loaned to USL team Austin Aztex in aim to get more playing time.

During the 2010 season, Deric became the first Academy Homegrown Player to start an MLS match. He made his professional debut on October 16, 2010, away to the San Jose Earthquakes, earning the shutout in a 1–0 victory. Deric broke the Dynamo's 12-game streak without a clean sheet after making 3 crucial saves and recording a shutout in his first appearance with the first team. To close the regular season, Deric appeared in the Dynamo's 2–1 win against Seattle Sounders FC, recording 5 saves.

For 2011, Pat Onstad had moved to DC United, making Deric the number 2 goalkeeper for Houston. Deric made no competitive first team appearances during 2011 besides a 2011 US Open Cup Qualifier loss to Sporting Kansas City. Deric did lead the MLS Reserve League with shutouts for 2011. For 2012 and 2013, Deric played only one league game but made three appearances in the Lamar Hunt U.S. Open Cup, with one shutout, and played six games in the CONCACAF Champions League, going 3–1–2 with two shutouts. Deric was loaned to NASL club San Antonio Scorpions on August 4, 2012, for their game against Puerto Rico Islanders. He made his first MLS appearance since 2010 on October 31, 2012, against the Colorado Rapids, a 2–0 loss despite Deric making 7 saves. During a road game on August 29 against Sporting Kansas City, Dynamo's first-choice goalkeeper, Tally Hall, suffered a torn ACL. Deric got to start the final 9 games of the season.

For 2015, Deric became the Houston starting goalkeeper after Tally Hall was traded to Orlando City. Deric had a strong start to the season, winning the MLS Save of the Week for weeks 2, 3, and 4 and being nominated for the award for the first 7 weeks of the season. He would win 4 and be nominated for 10 Save of the Week awards on the year as Deric cemented himself as the Dynamo number 1 goalkeeper.

Deric missed the first 6 games of 2016 with an abdominal strain. Deric made his first appearance of the season on April 23 against the Columbus Crew, a game in which he saw a red card. He then spent 1 game with the Dynamo's USL affiliate Rio Grande Valley FC before making 8 starts for the Dynamo. He suffered another abdominal strain injury in practice that made him miss 5 games. Deric returned to RGVFC to regain match fitness, but he suffered an elbow injury in his first appearance. He would miss the rest of the season.

Deric returned from injury in time to start the 2017 season. He started the first 5 games before getting benched in favor of Joe Willis. Deric regained his starting spot after 7 weeks on the bench and got a 1–1 draw against FC Dallas in his first game back. Deric had a strong end of the season, winning 2 of the final 3 games with 2 of them being clean sheets, to lead the Dynamo into the playoffs for the first time since 2013. His performances earned him the MLS Player of the Month award for October. In the 2017 MLS Cup Playoffs, Deric had clean sheet in the Dynamo's 1–0 win over Sporting Kansas City in the knockout round and another clean sheet in their 0–0 first leg draw with Portland Timbers in the first leg of the Western Conference Semi Finals. Deric was suspended by the league indefinitely on October 31, 2017, following his arrest for domestic violence, forcing him to miss the rest of the playoffs.

Deric's suspension ended and was reinstated by MLS on July 5, 2018. He was loaned to RGVFC and made his first appearance in over 8 months on July 22, a 0–0 draw with Swope Park Rangers. Deric would start 2 games for the Dynamo before the end of the year.

Deric started the season as the backup to Joe Willis and made a few appearances with RGVFC. He made his first appearance of the season for the Dynamo on June 11 in a 3–2 win over Austin Bold in the US Open Cup. Deric would make his first of 5 straight MLS starts on July 17, a 5–0 defeat to Atlanta United FC. Houston would win only one of those 5 games before switching back to Willis. However, Deric would start the final 2 games of the season for the Dynamo. On November 21, the Dynamo declined the option on Deric's contract, making him a free agent.

=== Rio Grande Valley FC ===
On February 25, 2021, Deric signed with Rio Grande Valley FC.

=== FC Tulsa ===
In September 2025, Deric joined USL Championship club FC Tulsa as an emergency replacement goalkeeper.

Following the 2025 season, Deric announced his retirement from playing professional soccer.

== Personal ==
In February 2012, Deric and teammate Warren Creavelle were arrested at night following a dispute with an off-duty police officer. Deric, accused of assaulting a public servant, was held in containment over night and released the following day, Sunday. Deric argued the officer was racist to his teammates after denying them entrance into a bar. All charges were later dropped on Deric.

On October 31, 2017, Deric was arrested, and subsequently suspended indefinitely by MLS, after being arrested for allegedly headbutting his girlfriend. On July 5, 2018, Deric was reinstated by MLS. Deric had made a plea agreement with the Harris Country District Attorney.

== Career statistics ==
As of match played October 14, 2023

Appearances and goals by club, season and competition
Club	Season	League			U.S. Open Cup		Continental		Playoffs		Total	
Club	Season	Division	Apps	Goals	Apps	Goals	Apps	Goals	Apps	Goals	Apps	Goals
Houston Dynamo	2009	MLS	0	0	0	0	–		0	0	0	0
Houston Dynamo	2010	MLS	2	0	0	0	–		–		2	0
Houston Dynamo	2011	MLS	0	0	1	0	–		0	0	1	0
Houston Dynamo	2012	MLS	1	0	1	0	4 (Note: Appearance(s) in CONCACAF Champions League)	0	0	0	6	0
Houston Dynamo	2013	MLS	0	0	2	0	2	0	0	0	4	0
Houston Dynamo	2014	MLS	11	0	1	0	–		–		12	0
Houston Dynamo	2015	MLS	31	0	0	0	–		–		31	0
Houston Dynamo	2016	MLS	10	0	0	0	–		–		10	0
Houston Dynamo	2017	MLS	26	0	0	0	–		2 (Note: Appearance(s) in MLS Cup Playoffs)	0	28	0
Houston Dynamo	2018	MLS	2	0	0	0	–		–		2	0
Houston Dynamo	2019	MLS	7	0	1	0	0	0	0	0	8	0
Houston Dynamo	Total		90	0	6	0	6	0	2	0	104	0
Austin Aztex (loan)	2009	USL First Division	0	0	0	0	–		–		0	0
San Antonio Scorpions (loan)	2012	NASL	1	0	0	0	–		–		1	0
Rio Grande Valley (loan)	2016	USL	2	0	0	0	–		–		2	0
Rio Grande Valley (loan)	2018	USL	5	0	0	0	–		–		5	0
Rio Grande Valley (loan)	2019	USLC	5	0	0	0	–		–		5	0
Rio Grande Valley	2021	USLC	28	0	0	0	–		–		28	0
Rio Grande Valley	2022	USLC	24	0	0	0	–		–		24	0
Rio Grande Valley	2023	USLC	28	0	0	0	–		–		28	0
Rio Grande Valley	Total	USLC	93	0	0	0	0	0	0	0	93	0
Career total			193	0	6	0	6	0	2	0	207	0

== Honors ==
=== Club ===
==== Houston Dynamo ====
- US Open Cup: 2018
