= Isidro Martinez =

American soccer player (born 1997)

Personal information
- Date of birth: March 15, 1997 (age 29)
- Place of birth: Brownsville, Texas, United States
- Height: 5 ft 8 in (1.73 m)
- Position: Midfielder

Team information
- Current team: Union Omaha
- Number: 30

College career
Years	Team	Apps	(Gls)
2015–2018	UT Rio Grande Valley Vaqueros	70	(9)

Senior career*
Years	Team	Apps	(Gls)
2018	South Georgia Tormenta	12	(0)
2019–2020	Rio Grande Valley	48	(1)
2021	New Mexico United	30	(1)
2022	Rio Grande Valley	33	(0)
2023	Forward Madison FC	26	(1)
2024	Northern Colorado Hailstorm	20	(1)
2025–	Union Omaha	25	(1)
- * Club domestic league appearances and goals as of October 31, 2025

Isidro "Chelo" Martinez (born March 15, 1997) is an American soccer player who plays as a midfielder for USL League One club Union Omaha.

== Career ==
=== Youth and college ===
Martinez attended Simon Rivera High School in Brownsville, Texas. His senior year he led the Raiders to an undefeated 28-0-0 record on their way to the UIL 6A Texas state championship. In the championship match, Martinez scored the opening goal as the Rivera Raiders won 2–1. At the end of the season, Martinez was named the 2015 USA Today Gatorade Texas Boys Soccer Player of the Year.

Martinez played four years of college soccer at the University of Texas Rio Grande Valley between 2015 and 2018, making 70 appearances, scoring 9 goals and tallying 13 assists.

While at college, Martinez appeared for USL Premier Development League side South Georgia Tormenta in 2018.

=== Professional ===
On March 8, 2019, Martinez signed for USL Championship side Rio Grande Valley.

On January 4, 2021, Martinez joined USL Championship side New Mexico United.

Martinez returned to Rio Grande Valley FC on February 4, 2022.

Martinez signed with Forward Madison FC of USL League One prior to the 2023 season.

On February 22, 2024, Martinez signed with USL League One side Northern Colorado Hailstorm ahead of their 2024 season.

Martinez joined USL League One side Union Omaha on March 6, 2025.

== Career statistics ==
As of March 20, 2023

Club	Season	League			Domestic Cup		League Cup		Total	
Club	Season	Division	Apps	Goals	Apps	Goals	Apps	Goals	Apps	Goals
South Georgia Tormenta FC	2018	USL PDL	12	0	1 (Note: Appearance(s) in U.S. Open Cup)	0	0	0	13	0
Rio Grande Valley FC Toros	2019	USL Championship	34	1	—		—		31	1
Rio Grande Valley FC Toros	2020	USL Championship	14	0	—		—		14	0
Rio Grande Valley FC Toros	Total		48	1	—		—		48	1
New Mexico United	2021	USL Championship	30	1	—		—		30	1
Rio Grande Valley FC Toros	2022	USL Championship	31	0	2	0	0	0	33	0
Career total			90	2	1	0	0	0	91	2
