= Juan David Cabezas =

Colombian soccer player (born 1991)

Personal information
- Full name: Juan David Cabezas Núñez
- Date of birth: 27 February 1991 (age 35)
- Place of birth: Cali, Colombia
- Height: 1.82 m (6 ft 0 in)
- Position: Midfielder

Youth career
- Deportivo Cali

Senior career*
Years	Team	Apps	(Gls)
2007–2018	Deportivo Cali	74	(9)
2010	→ Cúcuta Deportivo (loan)	6	(0)
2011	→ La Equidad (loan)	1	(0)
2013–2014	→ Once Caldas (loan)	34	(5)
2016	→ Independiente Medellín (loan)	29	(2)
2017	→ Houston Dynamo (loan)	27	(1)
2018–2020	Houston Dynamo	21	(1)
2019	→ Rio Grande Valley FC (loan)	4	(0)
2021–2023	Rio Grande Valley FC	67	(3)

International career
2011	Colombia U20	11	(0)
- * Club domestic league appearances and goals as of 19:27, 16 October 2023 (UTC)

Juan David Cabezas Núñez (born 27 February 1991) is a Colombian professional footballer who currently plays as a midfielder.

== Club career ==
=== Deportivo Cali ===
Cabezas joined the Deportivo Cali in 2000, spending 9 years in the academy. Cabezaz made his first team debut for Deportivo Cali in a Categoria Primera A match on 7 March 2009, coming on as a sub in a 2–1 win against Junior. He would pick up 2 more appearances that year.

The following season Cabezas went on loan to fellow Primera A club Cúcuta Deportivo. He made 6 league appearances before going out on loan again the following year, this time to La Equidad He got his first taste of the Copa Sudamericana while with La Equidad, getting a start in a 1–0 defeat to Club Libertad on 14 September 2011

Cabezas returned to Deportivo Cali in 2011, but only made 27 appearances before going out on loan again, this time to Once Caldes. He helped Los Albos qualify for the playoffs in both seasons with the club.

Deportivo Cali gave Cabezas another chance in 2014 and he didn't disappoint. The club reached the playoffs in 2014 and 2015 and he helped them become 2015 Apertura Champions.

In 2016, looking for more consistent game time, Cabezas went on loan to Independiente Medellín. He became a key player for DIM. In the 2016 Apertura finals against Junior, Cabezas scored the equalizing goal in the first leg, They went on to win 3–1 on aggregate.

=== Houston Dynamo ===
Cabezaz Joined the Dynamo and on loan for the 2017 season. He quickly established himself as a key figure in countryman Wilmer Cabrerea's side, getting his MLS debut by coming off the bench in the second match of the season. He recorded his first Dynamo goal on 29 July, an equalizer in a 2–2 draw with the Portland Timbers. After helping lead the Dynamo to the MLS Playoffs, Cabezas played every minute as Houston reached the Conference Finals. His strong season saw him be named team MVP for the 2017 season. Wilmer Cabrera described Cabezas as "a top player in the midfield for us and is a natural ball winner". The Dynamo rewarded his good performances by acquiring him on a permanent deal in December 2017.

Cabezas was plagued with injuries in 2018. In the first game of the season, he picked up a thigh muscle strain, forcing him to come off after 15 minutes and causing him to miss the next 9 games. In his first game since back from injury, he picked up another thigh injury that caused him to miss over 3 months and 20 games. Later he picked up another muscle injury that caused him to miss the final 3 games of the season. The team greatly missed him throughout the season, going 5-1-1 across all competitions when Cabezas played while only going 6-7-15 across all competitions in games Cabezas missed.

The Dynamo and Cabezas opened 2019 on 19 February with a CONCACAF Champions League match against CD Guastatoya. Despite Houston getting the 1–0 win, Cabezaa was forced off due to picking up an injury. After making 2 appearances with the Dynamo's USL Championship affiliate Rio Grande Valley FC to regain fitness, Cabezas returned to the Dynamo lineup on 13 April in a 2–1 win over the San Jose Earthquakes. He would find the back of the net for his second goal as a Dynamo on 9 August in a 3–2 defeat to New York City FC. On 11 September, Cabezas injured his knee after a reckless challenge from an opponent. The Dynamo would go onto defeat Minnesota United 2–0, but Cabezas would miss the rest of the season.

On 21 November, Cabezas had his contract option declined.

=== Rio Grande Valley FC ===
On 7 April 2021, Cabezas returned to Rio Grande Valley FC, signing a contract for the 2021 season.

== Personal ==
Cabezas received his U.S. green card in January 2019, which qualifies him as a domestic player for MLS roster purposes.

== Career statistics ==
As of 14 October 2023

Club Performance			League		Cup		Continental		Other		Total	
Club	Season	League	Apps	Goals	Apps	Goals	Apps	Goals	Apps	Goals	Apps	Goals
Colombia			League		Copa Colombia		CONMEBOL		Other		Total	
Deportivo Cali	2009	Categoría Primera A	3	0	0	0	—		—		3	0
Deportivo Cali	2011	Categoría Primera A	2	0	2	0	0	0	—		4	0
Deportivo Cali	2012	Categoría Primera A	9	0	1	0	—		—		10	0
Deportivo Cali	2013	Categoría Primera A	9	2	4	0	—		—		13	2
Deportivo Cali	2014	Categoría Primera A	19	6	4	2	3 (Note: Appearances in Copa Sudamericana)	0	—		26	8
Deportivo Cali	2015	Categoría Primera A	32	1	2	0	—		—		34	1
Deportivo Cali	Deportivo Cali Total		74	9	13	2	3	0	0	0	90	11
Cúcuta Deportivo (loan)	2010	Categoría Primera A	6	0	0	0			—		6	0
La Equidad (loan)	2011	Categoría Primera A	1	0	0	0	1	0	—		2	0
Once Caldas (loan)	2013	Categoría Primera A	18	3	0	0	—		—		18	3
Once Caldas (loan)	2014	Categoría Primera A	16	2	0	0	—		—		16	2
Once Caldas (loan)	Once CaldasTotal		34	5	0	0	0	0	0	0	34	5
Independiente Medellín (loan)	2016	Categoría Primera A	29	2	7	1	3	0	0	0	39	2
United States			League		US Open Cup		CONCACAF		Playoffs		Total	
Houston Dynamo (loan)	2017	Major League Soccer	27	1	0	0	—		5	0	32	1
Houston Dynamo	2018	Major League Soccer	6	0	1	0	—		—		7	0
Houston Dynamo	2019	Major League Soccer	15	1	2	0	2 (Note: One Appearance in CONCACAF Champions League and one in Leagues Cup)	0	—		19	1
Houston Dynamo	Dynamo Total		48	2	3	0	2	0	5	0	58	2
Rio Grande Valley FC (loan)	2019	USLC	3	0	—		—		—		3	0
Rio Grande Valley FC	2021	USLC	19	1	—		—		—		19	1
Rio Grande Valley FC	2022	USLC	26	1	2	0	—		—		28	1
Rio Grande Valley FC	2023	USLC	24	1	1	0	—		—		25	1
Rio Grande Valley FC	Total		73	3	3	0	0	0	0	0	75	3
Career Totals			264	21	26	3	9	0	5	0	304	35

== Honors ==
=== Club ===
Deportivo Cali

Categoría Primera A: 2015-I

Independiente Medellín

Categoría Primera A: 2016-I

Houston Dynamo

US Open Cup: 2018

=== Individual ===
Houston Dynamo

Dynamo Team MVP: 2017
