= Adolfo Hernández =

Mexican football player (born 1997)

Personal information
- Full name: Adolfo Enrique Hernández Sotelo
- Date of birth: 28 September 1997 (age 29)
- Place of birth: Álvaro Obregón, Mexico City, Mexico
- Height: 1.84 m (6 ft 0 in)
- Position: Forward

Team information
- Current team: Uzgen

Youth career
- 2014: Plateados de Cerro Azul
- 2015: Real San Cosme
- 2016: Deportivo Corregidora
- 2016-: UNAM

Senior career*
| Years | Team | Apps | (Gls) |
| 2018–2022 | UNAM | 3 | (0) |
| 2020–2021 | → Celaya (loan) | 25 | (2) |
| 2021 | → Pumas Tabasco (loan) | 12 | (1) |
| 2022 | → Rio Grande Valley FC (loan) | 10 | (1) |
| 2023–2024 | Irapuato | 25 | (14) |
| 2024 | Tepatitlán | 12 | (1) |
| 2025–2026 | Racing de Veracruz | 15 | (17) |
| 2026– | Uzgen | 0 | (0) |
- * Club domestic league appearances and goals as of 2 July 2026

Adolfo Enrique Hernández Sotelo (born 28 September 1997) is a Mexican professional footballer who plays as a forward for Kyrgyz Premier League club Uzgen.
