= Luka Malešević =

Montenegrin footballer (born 1998)

Personal information
- Date of birth: 1 August 1998 (age 28)
- Place of birth: Podgorica, Montenegro
- Height: 1.80 m (5 ft 11 in)
- Position: Defender

Team information
- Current team: Monterey Bay FC
- Number: 6

Youth career
- –2016: Budućnost Podgorica

Senior career*
Years	Team	Apps	(Gls)
2016–2018	Budućnost Podgorica	4	(0)
2016–2018	→ Mornar (loan)	46	(1)
2018–2021	Iskra Danilovgrad	87	(4)
2021	Radnik Surdulica	6	(0)
2022	Rio Grande Valley FC	18	(1)
2023–2024	Petrovac	41	(3)
2024	Dečić	16	(1)
2024–2025	Otrant-Olympic	16	(0)
2025	Mornar	11	(0)
2026–	Monterey Bay FC	11	(0)

International career
2014	Montenegro U17	4	(0)
2016	Montenegro U19	4	(0)
2019–2020	Montenegro U21	10	(0)
- * Club domestic league appearances and goals as of 18:47, 9 November 2026 (UTC)

Luka Malešević (born 1 August 1998) is a Montenegrin professional footballer who plays as a defender for USL Championship club Monterey Bay FC.

== Career ==
Malešević began his career with Budućnost Podgorica, making his only senior appearance for the club in 2016. He spent time on loan with Montenegrin Second League club Mornar Bar between 2016 and 2018. In 2018, he made the move to Iskra Danilovgrad, where he made 87 appearances in all competitions and played with Iskra in their UEFA Europa League qualifying matches.

In 2021, Malešević signed a three-and-a-half-year deal with Serbian SuperLiga side Radnik Surdulica, but he and the club mutually agreed to terminate his deal at the club on 25 November 2021.

On 2 March 2022, he moved to the United States, where he holds citizenship, signing with USL Championship club Rio Grande Valley FC.

On 22 January 2026, Malešević returned to the United States and USL Championship, signing a multi-year deal with Monterey Bay FC.

== Personal ==
Malešević also holds American citizenship.
