= Gabriel Benítez (footballer) =

Venezuelan footballer (born 1993)

Personal information
- Full name: Gabriel Alejandro Benítez D'Andrea
- Date of birth: 30 September 1993 (age 33)
- Place of birth: Caracas, Venezuela
- Height: 1.80 m (5 ft 11 in)
- Position: Left back

Senior career*
| Years | Team | Apps | (Gls) |
| 2011 | Deportivo La Guaira | 2 | (0) |
| 2011–2016 | Deportivo Petare | 84 | (2) |
| 2014 | → Portuguesa (loan) | 1 | (0) |
| 2016–2017 | Deportivo Anzoátegui | 8 | (0) |
| 2017 | Extremadura B | 1 | (0) |
| 2018–2020 | Zulia | 67 | (1) |
| 2021 | Atlético Venezuela | 21 | (0) |
| 2022 | Deportivo Táchira | 22 | (1) |
| 2023 | Rio Grande Valley FC | 24 | (0) |

International career
| 2019– | Venezuela | 1 | (0) |
- * Club domestic league appearances and goals as of 19:29, 16 October 2023 (UTC)

Gabriel Alejandro Benítez D'Andrea (born 30 September 1993) is a Venezuelan footballer.

== Career ==
=== Atlético Venezuela ===
In March 2020, Benítez joined Atlético Venezuela.
