= Érik Pimentel =

Mexican footballer (born 1990)

Personal information
- Full name: Érik Alan Pimentel Benavides
- Date of birth: May 15, 1990 (age 36)
- Place of birth: Coacalco de Berriozábal, Mexico
- Height: 1.77 m (5 ft 10 in)
- Position: Centre-back

Youth career
- 2007–2011: América

Senior career*
Years	Team	Apps	(Gls)
2011–2018	América	56	(1)
2013	→ Atlante (loan)	3	(0)
2017–2018	→ Puebla (loan)	13	(0)
2018–2019	Puebla	3	(0)
2019–2020	Mixco	18	(0)
2020	Correcaminos	10	(0)
2021–2023	Rio Grande Valley	69	(3)
- * Club domestic league appearances and goals as of 19:25, 16 October 2023 (UTC)

Érik Alan Pimentel Benavides (born 15 May 1990), also known as El Puma, is a Mexican professional footballer who plays as a centre-back.

== Club career ==
A homegrown player, Pimentel debuted in the Apertura 2011 tournament on 24 July 2011 as a starter in a match against Querétaro in which América won 2–1 at the Estadio Azteca.

On 27 April 2021, Pimentel joined USL Championship side Rio Grande Valley FC ahead of the 2021 season.

== Honours ==
América

- Liga MX: Apertura 2014
- CONCACAF Champions League: 2014–15, 2015–16
