= Duilio Herrera =

Mexican footballer (born 2004)

Personal information
- Full name: Duilio Herrera Ibarra
- Date of birth: 12 November 2004 (age 21)
- Place of birth: Reynosa, Mexico
- Height: 1.78 m (5 ft 10 in)
- Position: Winger

Youth career
- 2016–2022: Rio Grande Valley FC

Senior career*
Years	Team	Apps	(Gls)
2022–2023	Rio Grande Valley FC	23	(1)
- * Club domestic league appearances and goals as of 17:56, 8 June 2023 (UTC)

Duilio Herrera Ibarra (born 12 November 2004) is a Mexican professional footballer.

== Career ==
=== Youth ===
Herrera played as part of the Rio Grande Valley FC academy for five years, where he made more than one hundred appearances for the Toros in both the USL Academy competition and the MLS Next. Herrera signed a USL academy contract with the club's USL Championship first team on 9 February 2022. He made his debut on 12 March 2022, appearing as an 83rd–minute substitute during a 1–0 win over Oakland Roots.
