= Frank López (footballer, born 1995) =

Cuban footballer

Personal information
- Full name: Frank Manuel López García
- Date of birth: February 25, 1995 (age 31)
- Place of birth: Cienfuegos, Cuba
- Height: 5 ft 9 in (1.75 m)
- Position: Forward

Youth career
- 2015: FC Cienfuegos

Senior career*
Years	Team	Apps	(Gls)
2015–2018	Miami Soccer Academy		
2018–2019	LA Galaxy II	42	(19)
2019	→ San Antonio FC (loan)	14	(8)
2020–2021	OKC Energy	20	(4)
2020	→ Sacramento Republic (loan)	5	(0)
2021	→ Rio Grande Valley FC (loan)	10	(1)
2022–2023	Rio Grande Valley FC	60	(12)
2024	Miami FC	23	(7)
2025	El Paso Locomotive	11	(0)

International career^{‡}
2010–2011	Cuba U17		
2015	Cuba U20		
- * Club domestic league appearances and goals as of 29 October 2025 ‡ National team caps and goals as of 13 September 2020

Frank Manuel López García (born 25 February 1995) is a Cuban professional footballer.

== Club career ==
López played with the academy side of hometown team Cienfuegos, before moving to Florida and playing with the Miami Soccer Academy of the United Premier Soccer League. He had defected to the United States in October 2015 during the 2015 CONCACAF Men's Olympic Qualifying Championship, alongside teammates Emmanuel Labrada, Dairon Pérez and Yendry Torres.

On 15 March 2018, López signed with United Soccer League side LA Galaxy II.

On 15 July 2019, López joined USL side San Antonio FC on loan for the remainder of the season.

Following a loan spell from OKC Energy FC, López signed a permanent contract with Rio Grande Valley FC on February 8, 2022.

López signed with Miami FC in December 2023.
