= Francisco Nevárez =

Mexican footballer (born 2000)

Personal information
- Full name: Francisco Javier Nevárez Pulgarín
- Date of birth: 3 December 2000 (age 25)
- Place of birth: Juárez, Chihuahua, Mexico
- Height: 1.85 m (6 ft 1 in)
- Position: Defensive midfielder

Team information
- Current team: Juárez
- Number: 33

Youth career
- 2017: Guadalajara
- 2017–2022: Juárez

Senior career*
Years	Team	Apps	(Gls)
2018–	Juárez	79	(2)
2024	→ El Paso Locomotive (loan)	21	(2)
- * Club domestic league appearances and goals as of 20 November 2026

Francisco Javier Nevárez Pulgarín (born 3 December 2000) is a Mexican professional footballer who plays as a defensive midfielder for Liga MX club Juárez.

== Career statistics ==
=== Club ===
As of match played on 20 November 2026

Appearances and goals by club, season and competition
Club	Season	League			National cup		Continental		Other		Total	
Club	Season	Division	Apps	Goals	Apps	Goals	Apps	Goals	Apps	Goals	Apps	Goals
Juárez	2017–18	Ascenso MX	—		1	0	—		—		1	0
Juárez	2018–19	Ascenso MX	6	0	13	0	—		—		19	0
Juárez	2019–20	Liga MX	1	0	10	0	—		—		11	0
Juárez	2020–21	Liga MX	6	0	—		—		—		6	0
Juárez	2021–22	Liga MX	2	0	—		—		—		2	0
Juárez	2022–23	Liga MX	18	0	—		—		—		18	0
Juárez	2023–24	Liga MX	2	0	—		—		1 (Note: Appearance in Leagues Cup)	0	2	0
Juárez	2024–25	Liga MX	9	0	—		—		—		9	0
Juárez	2025–26	Liga MX	19	2	—		—		—		19	2
Juárez	2026–27	Liga MX	16	0	—		—		3	0	19	0
Juárez	Total		79	2	24	0	0	0	4	0	107	2
El Paso Locomotive	2024	USL Championship	21	2	1	0	—		—		22	2
Career total			100	4	25	0	0	0	4	0	129	4
