= Christian Pinzón =

American soccer player (born 1998)

Personal information
- Full name: Christian Pinzón Barajas
- Date of birth: June 24, 1998 (age 28)
- Place of birth: Bellflower, California, United States
- Height: 1.74 m (5 ft 9 in)
- Position: Attacking midfielder

Team information
- Current team: Las Vegas Lights
- Number: 11

Youth career
- –2017: California Rush

College career
Years	Team	Apps	(Gls)
2017–2021	Cal State Fullerton Titans	54	(14)

Senior career*
Years	Team	Apps	(Gls)
2019	FC Golden State Force	2	(1)
2021–2022	Tapatío	15	(1)
2022–2023	Rio Grande Valley FC	34	(10)
2024–	Las Vegas Lights	62	(6)
- * Club domestic league appearances and goals as of 10:19, 9 November 2026 (UTC)

Christian Pinzón Barajas (born June 24, 1998) is an American soccer player who currently plays for Las Vegas Lights in the USL Championship.

== Career ==
=== Youth ===
Pinzón attended Bellflower High School, where he scored 86 goals in 71 games and won two CIF-Southern Section titles. He was the Long Beach Press-Telegram Player of the Year as a senior. He also played club soccer with local side California Rush.

=== College and amateur ===
In 2017, Pinzón went to play college soccer at California State University, Fullerton. Despite his senior season been cancelled due to the COVID-19 pandemic, he went on to make 54 appearances for the Titans, scoring 14 goals and tallying seven assists. In 2019, he earned First Team All-Conference honors and All-Far West Region Second Team honors.

While at college, Pinzón also played with FC Golden State Force during their 2019 season, making a single appearance and scoring a single goal during their NPSL season, and making a single appearance in their USL League Two season.

=== Professional ===
On January 21, 2021, Pinzón was selected 47th overall in the 2021 MLS SuperDraft by Chicago Fire. However, he wasn't signed by the team. Soon after, he earned a trial with Guadalajara, and signed with their Liga de Expansión MX reserve team Tapatío in June 2021.

On July 6, 2022, Pinzón returned to the United States, signing with USL Championship side Rio Grande Valley FC.

On February 13, 2024, Pinzón signed with USL Championship side Las Vegas Lights ahead of their 2024 season.

Pinzón led the USL Championship with 10 assists during the 2026 season, earning him the league's Golden Playmaker award.

== Honors ==
Individual

- USL Championship Golden Playmaker award: 2026
