= Jonathan Ricketts =

American soccer player (born 1997)

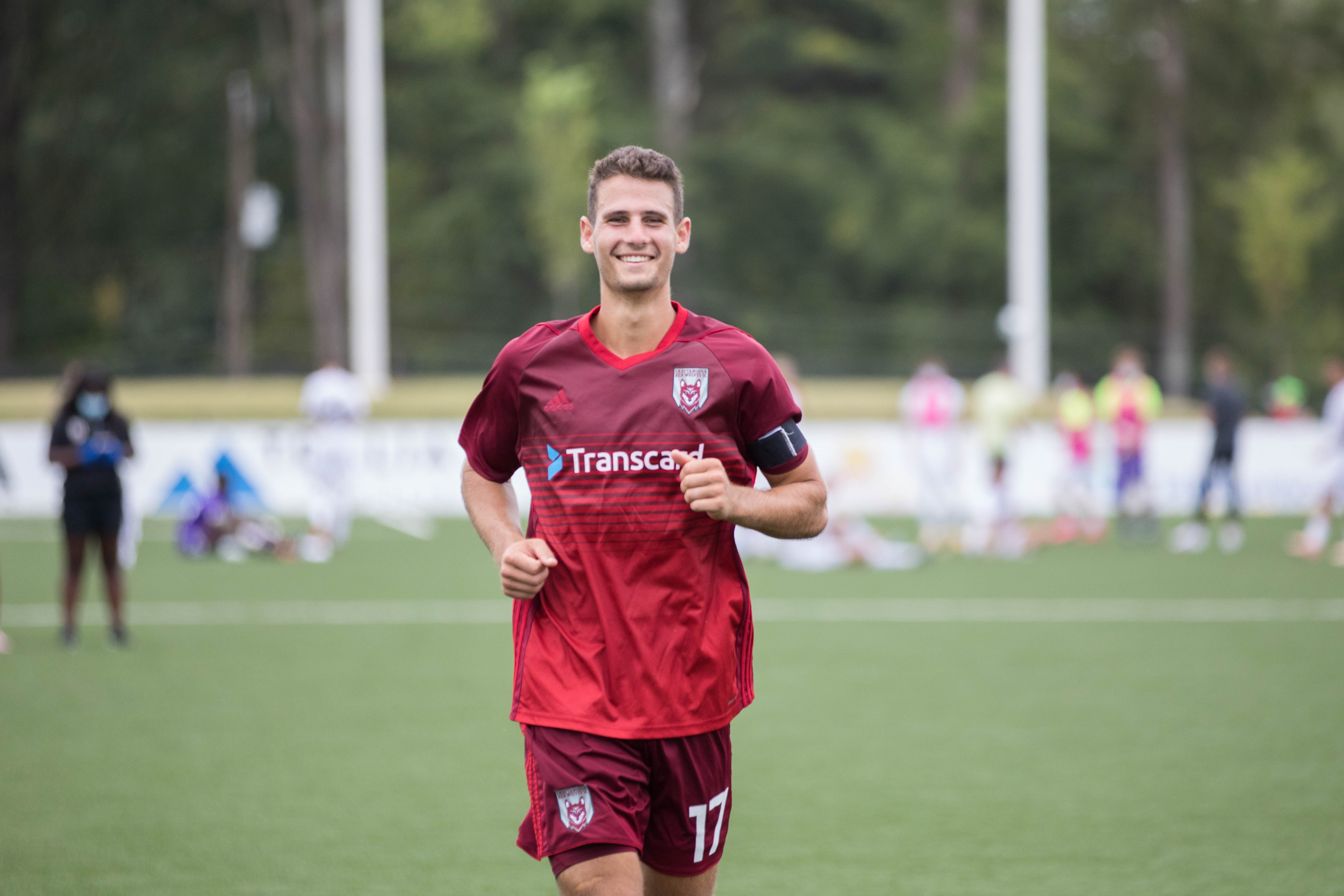

Personal information
- Full name: Jonathan Ricketts
- Date of birth: November 20, 1997 (age 28)
- Place of birth: Chattanooga, Tennessee, United States
- Height: 1.85 m (6 ft 1 in)
- Positions: Winger; right back

Team information
- Current team: Athletic Club Boise
- Number: 2

College career
Years	Team	Apps	(Gls)
2016–2019	Bryan College Lions	70	(33)

Senior career*
Years	Team	Apps	(Gls)
2018	Chattanooga FC	6	(0)
2019	Dalton Red Wolves	13	(3)
2020–2021	Chattanooga Red Wolves	44	(4)
2022–2023	Rio Grande Valley FC	62	(4)
2024	Sacramento Republic	18	(2)
2025	Miami FC	29	(1)
2026–	Athletic Club Boise	32	(1)
- * Club domestic league appearances and goals as of October 28, 2026

Jonathan Ricketts (born November 20, 1997) is an American professional soccer player who currently plays for Athletic Club Boise in the USL League One.

== Career ==
=== College and amateur ===
Ricketts played four years of college soccer at Bryan College between 2016 and 2019. During his time with the Lions, Ricketts made 70 appearances, scoring 33 goals and tallying 28 assists. In his junior season, Ricketts collected a spot on the Appalachian Athletic Conference (AAC) All-Conference First Team. In his last season at Bryan College, Ricketts repeated on the AAC All-Conference First Team, earned a spot on the All-Tournament Team, and found himself on CoSIDA's Academic All-District Team. During his time at college, Ricketts appeared for NPSL side Chattanooga FC in 2018, and with USL League Two side Dalton Red Wolves in 2019. For the Dalton Red Wolves, Ricketts scored 3 goals and tallied 3 assists in the 2019 season and earned himself a spot on the USL League 2 All-Southern Conference Team of the Year.

=== Professional ===
Ricketts signed his first professional contract in December 2019, joining USL League One side Chattanooga Red Wolves ahead of their 2020 season. He made his debut on July 25, 2020, starting in a 2–2 draw with South Georgia Tormenta. In his rookie season, he logged 1,212 minutes, earned 14 starts, connected 28.5 passes per match, won 43 aerial duels (73.8 percent of total aerial duals), won 129 duals (72.8 percent of total duels), and won 19 tackles (70.4 percent of total tackles). Ricketts landed on the USL League One Team of the Week once during his rookie campaign.

Chattanooga Red Wolves SC took Ricketts' option for the 2021 season. In his second season with the club, Ricketts made 29 appearances and logged starts in all 29 of those matches, compiling 2,644 minutes for the Red Wolves in their 2021 campaign. Ricketts scored four goals and assisted four times from the right back position. He had a 73.4 percent pass-completion percentage, 60 clearances, 6 blocks, and 52 interceptions on the season. Ricketts landed on USL League One's Team of the Week five times during the 2021 Season.

Ricketts made the move to USL Championship side Rio Grande Valley FC on February 23, 2022.

Ricketts joined USL Championship side Sacramento Republic ahead of their 2024 season.
