= Lucas Stauffer =

American soccer player (born 1995)

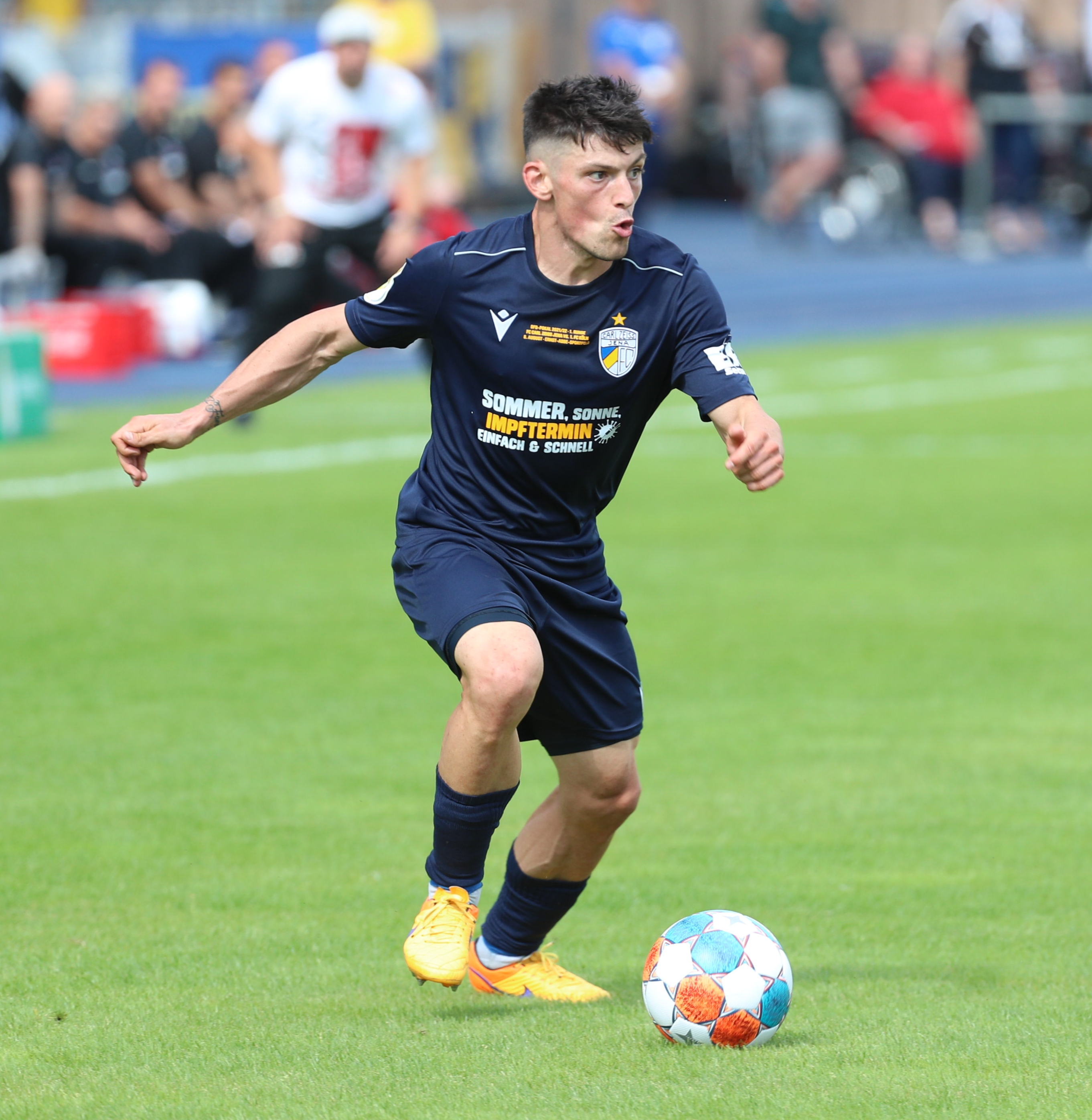
- Stauffer with Carl Zeiss Jena in 2021

Personal information
- Date of birth: April 21, 1995 (age 31)
- Place of birth: Owensboro, Kentucky, United States
- Height: 1.73 m (5 ft 8 in)
- Position: Full back

Team information
- Current team: FC Tulsa

Youth career
- 2012: Vitesse
- 2012: FC Twente
- 2013–2014: Vejle BK

College career
Years	Team	Apps	(Gls)
2014–2017	Creighton Bluejays	72	(7)

Senior career*
Years	Team	Apps	(Gls)
2015	Portland Timbers U23s	5	(0)
2015	Ocala Stampede	9	(0)
2016–2017	Des Moines Menace	12	(0)
2018	New York Red Bulls II	17	(2)
2019–2020	Wacker Nordhausen	17	(0)
2020–2022	Carl Zeiss Jena	43	(0)
2023	Las Vegas Lights	34	(3)
2024	El Paso Locomotive	29	(1)
2025	Lexington SC	0	(0)
2025–	FC Tulsa	49	(0)
- * Club domestic league appearances and goals as of November 10, 2026

Lucas Stauffer (born April 21, 1995) is an American professional soccer player who plays as a full back for USL Championship side FC Tulsa.

== Career ==
=== College ===
Stauffer played four years of college soccer at Creighton University between 2014 and 2017. During his time at Creighton, Stauffer was named Big East Conference All-Rookie Team in 2014, First Team All-Big East Conference in 2016, and USC Second Team All-Great Lakes Region and First Team All-Big East Conference in 2017.

While at college, Stauffer spent time with Premier Development League sides Portland Timbers U23s, Ocala Stampede and Des Moines Menace.

=== Professional ===
On January 17, 2018, Stauffer was selected 26th overall in the 2018 MLS SuperDraft by Vancouver Whitecaps FC. However, he was not signed by the club.

On April 18, 2018, Stauffer joined United Soccer League side New York Red Bulls II. On May 2, 2018, he made his professional debut for New York, appearing as a starter in a 0–0 draw with Ottawa Fury. On June 9, 2018, Stauffer scored his first goal as a professional in New York's 4–2 victory over Charlotte Independence.

Ahead of the German 2019–20 season, Stauffer joined FSV Wacker 90 Nordhausen on a one-year contract.

On February 15, 2023, Stauffer returned to the United States, signing with USL Championship side Las Vegas Lights FC. He moved to fellow USL Championship side El Paso Locomotive on January 10, 2024. Stauffer and El Paso mutually agreed to part ways following the 2024 season. He subsequently joined new USL Championship side Lexington SC for their 2025 season. On April 24, 2025, Stauffer was transferred to FC Tulsa without having made a regular season appearance for Lexington.
