= Ricky Ruiz =

American soccer player (born 1996)

Personal information
- Full name: Ricardo Ruiz
- Date of birth: November 4, 1996 (age 30)
- Place of birth: Lake Elsinore, California, United States
- Height: 1.68 m (5 ft 6 in)
- Positions: Full-back; winger

Team information
- Current team: El Paso Locomotive
- Number: 12

College career
Years	Team	Apps	(Gls)
2014–2017	UC Riverside Highlanders	75	(6)

Senior career*
Years	Team	Apps	(Gls)
2017	FC Golden State Force	6	(0)
2018	Orange County SC U23	5	(0)
2019	FC Golden State Force	4	(0)
2019	Los Angeles Force	6	(1)
2020–2021	Chattanooga Red Wolves	42	(4)
2022–2023	Rio Grande Valley FC	64	(5)
2024	Chattanooga Red Wolves	9	(0)
2024–	El Paso Locomotive	68	(2)
- * Club domestic league appearances and goals as of 21:03, 8 November 2026 (UTC)

Ricardo "Ricky" Ruiz (born November 4, 1996) is an American professional soccer player who plays for USL Championship club El Paso Locomotive.

== Career ==
=== College and amateur ===
Ruiz played four years of college soccer at the University of California, Riverside between 2014 and 2017. During his time with the Highlanders, Ruiz made 75 appearances, scoring 6 goals and tallying 12 assists.

During and after his time at college, Ruiz also appeared for clubs in the USL League Two, including FC Golden State Force in 2017 and 2019, and for Orange County SC U23 in 2018.

=== Professional ===
Ruiz signed his first professional contract in September 2019, joining NISA side Los Angeles Force ahead of their inaugural season. He scored 2 goals in 7 appearances for LA Force during the regular season and play-offs.

On January 27, 2020, Ruiz signed with USL League One side Chattanooga Red Wolves.

Ruiz made the move to USL Championship side Rio Grande Valley FC on February 23, 2022. Rio Grande Valley folded following the 2023 USL Championship season.

Ruiz returned to the Red Wolves on January 26, 2024.

Ruiz transferred to USL Championship club El Paso Locomotive on July 17, 2024.
