= Robert Coronado =

American soccer player (born 1996)

Personal information
- Date of birth: August 3, 1996 (age 30)
- Place of birth: La Habra, California, United States
- Height: 5 ft 10 in (1.78 m)
- Positions: Defender; midfielder

Team information
- Current team: El Paso Locomotive
- Number: 30

College career
Years	Team	Apps	(Gls)
2014–2018	Cal State Fullerton Titans	86	(5)

Senior career*
Years	Team	Apps	(Gls)
2016	FC Golden State Force	2	(0)
2018	Orange County SC U23	1	(0)
2019–2020	Rio Grande Valley FC	33	(1)
2021	OKC Energy	12	(0)
2022–2023	Rio Grande Valley FC	57	(5)
2024	Central Valley Fuego	6	(2)
2024–	El Paso Locomotive	68	(3)
- * Club domestic league appearances and goals as of 21:07, 8 November 2026 (UTC)

Robert Coronado (born August 3, 1996) is an American soccer player who currently plays for El Paso Locomotive in the USL Championship.

== Career ==
=== Youth and college ===
Coronado played four years of college soccer at Cal State Fullerton between 2014 and 2018, including a red-shirted 2017 season, making 86 appearances, scoring five goals and tallying 18 assists.

While at college, Coronado appeared for USL Premier Development League sides FC Golden State Force and Orange County SC U23.

=== Professional ===
On March 8, 2019, Coronado signed for USL Championship side Rio Grande Valley FC.

On January 21, 2021, Coronado joined USL Championship side OKC Energy FC following his release from Rio Grande Valley.

On February 4, 2022, it was announced that Rio Grande Valley FC had re-signed Coronado ahead of their 2022 season.

Coronado signed with USL League One side Central Valley Fuego ahead of their 2024 season.

Coronado returned to the USL Championship on July 18, 2024, joining El Paso Locomotive.
