= Rio Grande Valley FC Toros =

Soccer team in Texas, US

Rio Grande Valley FC
- Full name: Rio Grande Valley; Football Club
- Nicknames: Toros, RGVFC
- Founded: July 15, 2015; 10 years ago
- Dissolved: December 18, 2023; 23 months ago
- Stadium: H-E-B Park; Edinburg, Texas
- Capacity: 9,735
- Owner: Alonzo Cantu
- Website: www.rgvfc.com
Home colors	Away colors

Rio Grande Valley FC, also known as RGVFC or Rio Grande Valley FC Toros, was an American professional soccer team based in Edinburg, Texas operated by Lone Star, LLC. They joined the USL Championship in the 2016 season.

The team served as a hybrid affiliate of the Houston Dynamo of Major League Soccer. Chris Canetti, Houston Dynamo president, called the relationship "an important and necessary step." The hybrid affiliation, a first for the USL, meant that the Dynamo would be responsible for the soccer operation of the club, selecting players and coaching staff. The ownership group, Lone Star, was responsible for operations and day-to-day management of the club.

== History ==
In September 2014, Dynamo officials met with USL officials about creating a USL team and announced their intention to have a USL team in place for the 2016 season.

In March 2015, Bert Garcia announced that the Rio Grande Valley Vipers of the NBA D-league had been awarded a franchise pending concrete plans for a stadium and a name and confirmed a report on MLSSoccer.com that the Houston Dynamo would likely be the MLS affiliate for the USL team in the Rio Grande Valley.

In December 2015, the Houston Dynamo signed Dynamo Academy product Charly Flores as the first player of the Toros.

In December 2020, RGV FC Toros separated from the Houston Dynamo and became an independent soccer club.

On December 18, 2023, RGV FC Toros announced they were ceasing all soccer and business operations, officially ending their eight-year stay with USL.

== Record ==
=== Year–by–year ===
Year	Division	League	Regular season W-T-L	Playoffs	US Open Cup	Avg. attendance
2016	3	USL	2nd, Western: 14–9–7	Conference Quarterfinals	Not eligible (MLS Reserve Team)	1,994
2017	2	USL	11th, Western: 9–8–15	Did not qualify	Not eligible (MLS Reserve Team)	7,067
2018	2	USL	13th, Western: 8–14–12	Did not qualify	Not eligible (MLS Reserve Team)	4,650
2019	2	USLC	13th, Western: 11–8–15	Did not qualify	Not eligible (MLS Reserve Team)	3,812
2020	2	USLC	13th, Western: 2–3–9	Did not qualify	Not eligible (MLS Reserve Team)	N/A
2021	2	USLC	4th, Western, Mountain Division: 13-8-11	Conference Semifinals	Cancelled due to COVID-19	2,506
2022	2	USLC	6th, Western: 14-7-13	Conference Semifinals	Third Round	4,074
2023	2	USLC	9th, Western: 10-13-11	Did not qualify	Second Round	4,506

=== Head coaches ===
- Includes USL Regular season, USL Play-offs and Lamar Hunt U.S. Open Cup

Coach	Nationality	Start	End	Games	Win	Draw	Loss	Win %
Wilmer Cabrera	Colombia	December 2, 2015	October 28, 2016	31	14	8	9	45.16
Junior Gonzalez	United States	December 15, 2016	November 8, 2017	32	9	15	8	28.13
Gerson Echeverry	Colombia	December 6, 2017	November 6, 2020	80	19	36	25	23.75
Wilmer Cabrera	Colombia	February 11, 2021	November 21, 2023	91	30	27	34	32.97

== Stadium ==
The club had a 9,400-seat soccer-specific stadium in Edinburg, Texas for the team. It was set to open after the Toros played three games at the soccer complex at the University of Texas Rio Grande Valley to start the 2016 USL Season.

The stadium was never completed for play in 2016. Construction of the H-E-B Park was completed during the first quarter of 2017 and the Toros played C.F. Monterrey from Mexico on March 22, 2017 to inaugurate their new stadium. The Toros lost their exhibition match against Rayados 0–3. The Toros won their first home game at H-E-B Park on April 12, 2017 against the Colorado Springs Switchbacks. Their home record attendance is 7,820 which was set on April 29, 2017 against the Oklahoma City Energy.
