= 2019 Fresno FC season =

Fresno FC
2019 season
- Owner: Ray Beshoff
- General manager: Frank Yallop
- Head coach: Adam Smith
- USL Championship: Western Conference: 3rd
- USL Playoffs: Conference Quarterfinals
- 2019 U.S. Open Cup: 2nd Round
- Highest home attendance: League/All: 7,863 (March 23 vs. Reno 1868 FC)
- Lowest home attendance: League/All: 2,343 (September 18 vs. Rio Grande Valley FC Toros)
- Average home league attendance: 4,117
- Biggest win: 5–0 (September 18 vs. Rio Grande Valley FC Toros)
- Biggest defeat: 1–3 (September 14 vs. Las Vegas Lights FC)

The 2019 Fresno FC season was the club's second season in the United Soccer League Championship, the second tier of the American soccer pyramid.

== Current squad ==
As of March 5, 2019

No.	Position	Nation	Player
1	GK	USA	C. J. Cochran
2	DF	CAN	Zach Ellis-Hayden
3	MF	USA	Elijah Martin
4	DF	MEX	Ramón Martín del Campo
5	DF	USA	Michael Daly
6	MF	MEX	Jorge Escamilla
7	MF	BRA	Jackson
8	MF	USA	Milton Blanco
9	FW	USA	Jaime Chavez
10	MF	ARG	Juan Pablo Caffa
11	FW	USA	Jemal Johnson
13	MF	BIH	Emir Alihodžić
14	DF	HAI	Jems Geffrard
15	MF	JPN	Hiroki Kurimoto
16	MF	SLE	Suleiman Samura
17	MF	USA	Arun Basuljevic
18	DF	SCO	Alex Cooper
19	MF	USA	Devann Yao
20	FW	NGR	Qudus Lawal
21	FW	USA	Christian Chaney
22	MF	MEX	Diego Casillas
23	FW	PER	Renato Bustamante
24	DF	USA	Sam Strong
33	GK	USA	Oscar Fernandez
28	GK	USA	Sam Howard
30	GK	USA	Matías Fernández

== Competitions ==
=== Preseason friendlies ===
February 8, 2019	Fresno FC	2–1	LA Galaxy II	Fresno, California
7:00PM PDT	Daly 25'; Johnson (yellow card) 29'; Chaney 49'	Report	Zubak (yellow card) 34'; Arellano 59'	Stadium: Chukchansi Park

February 12, 2019	Academica SC	2–3	Fresno FC	Turlock, California
6:00PM PDT				Stadium: Warrior Stadium

February 16, 2019	Fresno FC	3–0	Cal State Bakersfield Roadrunners	Fresno, California
3:00PM PDT	Lawal 7'; Basuljevic; Trialist	USL Report		Stadium: Fresno City College Soccer Field

February 21, 2019	Santa Barbara Gauchos	0–1	Fresno FC	Santa Barbara, California
6:00PM PDT		Report	Lawal 77'	Stadium: Harder Stadium

February 27, 2019	Fresno Pacific Sunbirds	1–3	Fresno FC	Fresno, California
7:00PM PDT	43'	Report	Bustamante 40', 58'; Johnson 86'	Stadium: Ramirez Field

March 2, 2019	Fresno City Rams	0–6	Fresno FC	Fresno, California
3:00PM PDT		Report	Chavez 1', 17', 62'; Basuljevic 63', 85', 90'	Stadium: Fresno City College Field

=== USL Championship ===
==== Western Conference Table ====
Pos	Team	Pld	W	D	L	GF	GA	GD	Pts	Qualification
1	Phoenix Rising FC (X)	34	24	6	4	89	36	+53	78	Conference Quarterfinals
2	Reno 1868 FC	34	18	6	10	72	51	+21	60	Conference Quarterfinals
3	Fresno FC	34	16	9	9	58	44	+14	57	Conference Quarterfinals
4	Real Monarchs (C)	34	16	8	10	71	53	+18	56	Conference Quarterfinals
5	Orange County SC	34	15	9	10	54	43	+11	54	Conference Quarterfinals

Source: USL Championship Standings
Rules for classification: 1) total wins; 2) total goal differential; 3) total goals scored; 4) points earned against top four Conference finishers; 5) disciplinary points; 6) coin toss or drawing of lots
(C) Champions; (X) Regular Season League Champion

==== Results ====
Win Draw Loss Upcoming fixture

March 9 1	New Mexico United	1–1	Fresno FC	Albuquerque, NM
7:30 PM	Sandoval 25', (yellow card) 61'	Report	Jackson 47'; Daly (yellow card) 75'	Stadium: Isotopes Park; Attendance: 12,896; Referee: Mark Allatin

March 16 2	Rio Grande Valley FC Toros	0–2	Fresno FC	Edinburg, TX
7:30 PM	Arcila (yellow card) 83'	Report	Basuljevic 2', 60'; Chavez (yellow card) 13'; Ellis-Hayden (yellow card) 22'; Moses (yellow card) 33'	Stadium: H-E-B Park; Attendance: 4,460; Referee: Elijio Arreguin

March 23 3	Fresno FC	1–1	Reno 1868 FC	Fresno, CA
7:30 PM	Janjigian 31' (o.g.); Chaney (yellow card) 46'; Moses (yellow card) 52'	Report	Mendiola 42'; Carroll (yellow card) 72'	Stadium: Chukchansi Park; Attendance: 7,863; Referee: Greg Dopka

April 6 4	Phoenix Rising FC	0–0	Fresno FC	Scottsdale, AZ
7:30 PM	Lambert (yellow card) 69'	Report	Moses (yellow card) 11' (red card) 40'; Martin (yellow card) 75'	Stadium: Phoenix Rising FC Soccer Complex; Attendance: 6,433; Referee: Farhad Dadkho

April 13 5	Fresno FC	3–1	Tulsa Roughnecks FC	Fresno, CA
7:30 PM	Alihodžić (yellow card) 31'; Johnson 33', 59'; Chavez 55', (yellow card) 72'	Report	Silva 39' da Costa (yellow card) 45+4'; Mompremier (yellow card) 65'; Bastidas (yellow card) 69'	Stadium: Chukchansi Park; Attendance: 4,348; Referee: Nicholas Marin

April 26 6	Fresno FC	2–2	Orange County SC	Fresno, CA
7:30 PM	del Campo (yellow card) 25'; Moses (yellow card) 75' (yellow-red card) 90+2'; Chaney 79'; Caffa 84'	Report	van Ewijk 4', (yellow card) 65'; Forrester 12'; Seaton (yellow card) 25'; Arellano (yellow card) 68'; Trotter (yellow card) 69'; Crisostomo (yellow card) 86'	Stadium: Chukchansi Park; Attendance: 4,576; Referee: Joseph Salinas

May 4 7	Real Monarchs	2–4	Fresno FC	Herriman, UT
12:00 PM	Chang 17'; Heard 84'; Ávila (yellow card) 87'	Report	Chaney 27', 61'; Ryden 58' (o.g.); Johnson 90'	Stadium: Zions Bank Stadium; Attendance: 2,685; Referee: Dejan Susak

May 8 8	Fresno FC	0–1	Sacramento Republic FC	Fresno, CA
7:30 PM	Chaney (yellow card) 41'; Jackson (yellow card) 74'	Report	Keinan (yellow card) 26'; Werner 29'; McCrary (yellow card) 49'; Cohen (yellow card) 89'	Stadium: Chukchansi Park; Attendance: 2,968; Referee: Luis Guardia

May 12 9	LA Galaxy II	0–3	Fresno FC	Carson, CA
19:00	Hernández (yellow card) 35'; Iloski (yellow card) 51'	Report	Jackson 26' (pen.); Lawal 34', 55'; Ellis-Hayden (yellow card) 47' del Campo (yellow card) 76'; Moses (yellow card) 82'	Stadium: Dignity Health Sports Park; Attendance: 616; Referee: Ismir Pekmic

May 22 10	Fresno FC	1–0	Austin Bold FC	Fresno, CA
9:30 PM	Chaney (yellow card) 25'; Cochran (yellow card) 55'; Lawal 84', (yellow card) 85'	Report	Lima (yellow card) 54'; McFarlane (yellow card) 54'	Stadium: Chukchansi Park; Attendance: 3,115; Referee: Malik Badawi

May 26 11	Tacoma Defiance	3–3	Fresno FC	Tacoma, WA
1:30 pm (PDT)	Wingo (yellow card) 31'; Hopeau 52'; Dhillon 90'	Report	Lawal 38'; Daly 48' (o.g.); Basuljevic 54'; Chavez 81'	Stadium: Cheney Stadium; Attendance: 1,788; Referee: Mark Allatin

June 1 12	Colorado Springs Switchbacks FC	1–0	Fresno FC	Colorado Springs, CO
8:30 PM	Burt 45'; Reaves (yellow card) 83'; Molano (yellow card) 89'	Report		Stadium: Weidner Field; Attendance: 3,517; Referee: Michael Radchuk

June 8 13	Fresno FC	1–1	OKC Energy FC	Fresno, CA
7:30 PM	Johnson 8'	Report	Harris (yellow card) 33'; Šašivarević (yellow card) 39'; Brown 79'	Stadium: Chukchansi Park; Attendance: 3,428; Referee: Alejandro Aguilera

June 16 14	Portland Timbers 2	2–2	Fresno FC	Portland, OR
2:00 PM	Asprilla (yellow card) 45+3'; Wharton 47' (pen.); Langsdorf (yellow card) 72'; Smith 90+2'	Report	Martin 53'; Kurimoto (yellow card) 66'; Lawal 68'; Cochran (yellow card) 72'	Stadium: Providence Park; Attendance: 3,513; Referee: Elton Garcia

June 21 15	Fresno FC	3–2	San Antonio FC	Fresno, CA
7:30 PM	Strong (yellow card) 12'; Johnson (yellow card) 20', (goal) 56', 64' (pen.); Chavez 70'	Report	Jamieson 58', (yellow card) 67'; Parano 78'; Barmby (yellow card) 90'	Stadium: Chukchansi Park; Attendance: 3,674; Referee: Brad Jensen

June 29 16	Fresno FC	3–0	El Paso Locomotive FC	Fresno, CA
8:30 PM	Jackson 63'; Lawal 66', (yellow card) 68', (goal) 84'; Johnson (yellow card) 86'	Report	Navarro (yellow card) 28'; Fox (yellow card) 73'; Herrera (yellow card) 86'	Stadium: Chukchansi Park; Attendance: 3,452; Referee: Ismir Pekmic

July 3 17	Sacramento Republic FC	0–1	Fresno FC	Sacramento, CA
8:00 PM	Keinan (red card) 73'; McCrary (yellow card) 90+4'	Report	del Campo (yellow card) 60'; Lawal (yellow card) 63'; Chavez (red card) 73'; Casillas 77'	Stadium: Papa Murphy's Park; Attendance: 9,677; Referee: Dejan Susak

July 13 18	Fresno FC	2–1	New Mexico United	Fresno, CA
8:30 PM	Johnson 18' (pen.); Caffa (yellow card) 45'; Daly 48'	Report	Schmidt 40'	Stadium: Chukchansi Park; Attendance: 4,029; Referee: Matthew Thompson

July 20 19	Fresno FC	2–1	Portland Timbers 2	Fresno, CA
8:30 PM	del Campo 6'; Basuljevic 19'; Johnson (yellow card) 40'; Lawal (yellow card) 44'; Cooper (yellow card) 84'	Report	Wharton (yellow card) 44'; Sierakowski 47'	Stadium: Chukchansi Park; Attendance: 3,457; Referee: Mark Allatin

July 27 20	Austin Bold FC	1–0	Fresno FC	Austin, TX
7:30 PM	Promise 43'; Soto (yellow card) 48'	Report	Basuljevic (yellow card) 37'; Chaney (yellow card) 85'	Stadium: Austin Bold Stadium; Attendance: 2,430; Referee: Greg Dopka

August 3 21	Fresno FC	2–1	Las Vegas Lights	Fresno, CA
7:30 PM	Chavez 41', 56'	Report	Levin (red card) 45+3'; Cruz 80'	Stadium: Chukchansi Park; Attendance: 3,413; Referee: Turan Ozdemir

August 10 22	OKC Energy	1–2	Fresno FC	Oklahoma City, OK
6:00 PM	Hyland 23'; Eissele (yellow card) 60'	Report	Chávez 27' , (yellow card) 55'; Ellis-Hayden (yellow card) 56' del Campo 79'	Stadium: Taft Stadium; Attendance: 3,853; Referee: Adam Kilpatrick

August 16 23	Fresno FC	1–1	Real Monarchs	Fresno, CA
7:30 PM	Chavez 38'; Daly (yellow card) 57'; Ellis-Hayden (yellow card) 78'	Report	Martínez 71'	Stadium: Chukchansi Park; Attendance: 3,842; Referee: Matthew Thompson

August 24 24	Fresno FC	2–1	Colorado Springs Switchbacks	Fresno, CA
7:30 PM	del Campo (yellow card) 53', (goal) 90'; Kurimoto 67'	Report	Anderson (yellow card) 27'; Rwatubyaye (yellow card) 29'; Robinson 63'	Stadium: Chukchansi Park; Attendance: 3,396; Referee: Alejandro Aguilera

August 31 25	Tulsa Roughnecks FC	2–1	Fresno FC	Tulsa, OK
5:30 PM	da Costa 5'; Marlon 46'; Lewis (yellow card) 90+3'	Report	Chavez 28', (yellow card) 72'; Martin (yellow card) 73'; Kurimoto (yellow card) 86'	Stadium: ONEOK Field; Attendance: 1,516; Referee: Jonathan Bilinski

September 7 26	Reno 1868 FC	2–3	Fresno FC	Reno, NV
7:00 PM	Lacroix (yellow card) 68'; Musovski 89', 90+2'; Carroll (yellow card) 90+3'; Seymore (yellow card) 90+3'	Report	Chavez 23'; Martin (yellow card) 29'; Caffa 35' (pen.); Cooper (yellow card) 45'; Ellis-Hayden (yellow card) 60'; Alihodžić 90+4', (yellow card) 90+5'	Stadium: Greater Nevada Field; Attendance: 4,962; Referee: Elijio Arreguin

September 14 27	Las Vegas Lights	3–1	Fresno FC	Las Vegas, NV
7:30 PM	Martínez 21'; Sousa (yellow card) 54'; Tabortetaka 58'; Parra 71' (pen.)	Report	Daly (yellow card) 9'; Cooper 17', (yellow card) 78' del Campo (yellow card) 52'	Stadium: Cashman Field; Attendance: 7,228; Referee: Malik Badawi

September 18 28	Fresno FC	5–0	Rio Grande Valley FC Toros	Fresno, CA
9:30 PM	Lawal 6', 63', (yellow card) 69'; Alihodžić 30' (pen.); Chavez 44', 61'	Report	Donovan (yellow card) 28'	Stadium: Chukchansi Park; Attendance: 2,343; Referee: Brandon Stevis

September 21 29	Fresno FC	2–1	Phoenix Rising FC	Fresno, CA
7:30pm	Ellis-Hayden (yellow card) 40'; Lawal 68', (yellow card) 75'; Kurimoto (yellow card) 77'; Chavez 83' (pen.); Martin (yellow card) 85'; Daly (yellow card) 90+2'	Report	Dia (yellow card) 75'; Flemmings 78'; Dumbuya (yellow card) 81'	Stadium: Chukchansi Park; Attendance: 4,523; Referee: Elton García

September 28 30	San Antonio FC	2–1	Fresno FC	San Antonio, TX
5:30 PM	Restrepo 17', (yellow card) 71'; Yaro (yellow card) 53'; Hernández 67'; Parano (yellow card) 71'; Castillo (yellow card) 78'	Report	del Campo (yellow card) 8'; Geffrard (yellow card) 49'; Cooper 55'; Jackson (yellow card) 62'; Samura (yellow card) 78'	Stadium: Toyota Field; Referee: Farhad Dadkho

October 2 31	El Paso Locomotive FC	2–1	Fresno FC	El Paso, TX
5:00 PM	N'Toko 53'; Salgado (yellow card) 88'; Kiesewetter 90+2'	Report	Kurimoto (yellow card) 42'; Ellis-Hayden (yellow card) 56'; Caffa 66'; Lawal (yellow card) 87'	Stadium: Southwest University Park; Referee: Elvis Osmanovic

October 5 32	Fresno FC	1–4	Tacoma Defiance	Fresno, CA
7:30 pm (PDT)	Samura (yellow card) 52'; Chaney 83'; Alihodžić (yellow card) 90+1'	Report	Villanueva (yellow card) 28'; Dhillon 31', 64'; Daley (yellow card) 53'; Ocampo-Chavez 69' (yellow card) 69'; Leyva 75'	Stadium: Chukchansi Park; Attendance: 3,819; Referee: Eric Tattersall

October 12 33	Fresno FC	2–2	LA Galaxy II	Fresno, CA
7:30 PM	Casillas 22'; Alihodžić (yellow card) 45+3'; Kurimoto (yellow card) 63'; Caffa 85' (pen.)	Report	Cuello 30'; Koreniuk (yellow card) 52'; Kamara 90+2'	Stadium: Chukchansi Park; Attendance: 7,742; Referee: JJ Bilinski

October 19 34	Orange County SC	2–0	Fresno FC	Irvine, CA
7:00 PM	Forrester 45'; Quinn 87' (pen.)	Report	Lawal (yellow card) 29' (yellow-red card) 41'; Moses (yellow card) 34' del Campo (red card) 86'; Strong (yellow card) 87'	Stadium: Championship Soccer Stadium; Attendance: 5,122; Referee: Elijio Arreguin

==== USL Cup Playoffs ====
October 26 Conference Quarterfinals	Fresno FC	2–3	El Paso Locomotive FC	Fresno, CA
8:30 PM	Chaney 49'; Strong (yellow card) 51' (red card) 86'; Cooper 55'	Report	Gómez 19'; Kiffe 77'; Velásquez 83' (pen.)	Stadium: Chukchansi Park; Attendance: 5,352; Referee: Lukasz Szpala

=== U.S. Open Cup ===
As a member of the USL Championship, the Fresno FC will enter the tournament in the Second Round, to be played May 14–15, 2019

May 15 Second Round	El Farolito (California)	0–1	(California) Fresno FC	San Francisco, CA
2:30 PM	Garduño (yellow card) 12'; Cardona (yellow card) 58'; Haywood (yellow card) 87'	Report	Strong (yellow card) 10'; Lawal 75'	Stadium: Boxer Stadium; Attendance: 205; Referee: Nicholas Marin

May 29 Third Round	Sacramento Republic FC (California)	1–0 (a.e.t.)	(California) Fresno FC	Sacramento, CA
7:30 pm PDT	Chantzopoulos (yellow card) 18'; Saari (yellow card) 31'; Bonomo 120+3'	Report	Strong (yellow card) 85'; Basuljevic (yellow card) 102'; Martin (yellow card) 107'	Stadium: Papa Murphy's Park; Attendance: 1,618; Referee: Farhad Dadkho
