= 2021 OKC Energy FC season =

OKC Energy
2021 season
- Owner: Prodigal LLC
- Head Coach: Leigh Veidman (Interim)
- United Soccer League: Eastern Conference: (current)
- U.S. Open Cup: Cancelled
- Top goalscorer: League: Villyan Bijev (12); All: Villyan Bijev (12)
- Highest home attendance: 3,677 (Sept. 29 vs. Indy Eleven)
- Lowest home attendance: 1,579 (Sept. 12 vs. Louisville)
- Average home league attendance: 2,265
- Biggest win: OKC 4–1 MEM (8/7)
- Biggest defeat: ELP 4–0 OKC (10/24)
Home colors	Away colors	Third colors

The 2021 OKC Energy FC season was the club's eighth and final season of existence, and their eighth consecutive season in the USL Championship, the second tier of American soccer. The season covers the period from October 3, 2020, to the beginning of the 2022 USLC season. The 2021 season was the second for OKC coach John Pascarella. On June 4, 2021, following a winless start to the 2021 USL Championship season, Pascarella and the OKC Energy mutually agreed to part ways.

== Roster ==
As of match played July 2, 2021

No.	Name	Nationality	Position(s)	Date of birth (age)	Signed in	Previous club	Apps	Goals
Goalkeepers
1	C.J. Cochran	(United States)	GK	September 27, 1991 (age 34)	2020	(United States) Fresno FC	58	0
35	Kyle Ihn	(United States)	GK	December 20, 1994 (age 31)	2020	(United States) Lansing Ignite	1	0
23	Sam Howard	(United States)	GK	December 23, 1992 (age 33)	2021	(United States) Union Omaha	0	0
Defenders
3	Rob Coronado	(United States)	DF	August 3, 1996 (age 30)	2021	(United States) Rio Grande Valley FC	12	0
4	Mitch Osmond	(Australia)	DF	March 11, 1994 (age 32)	2021	(United States) Indy Eleven	32	1
15	Lamar Batista	(United States)	DF	March 7, 1998 (age 28)	2021	(United States) Colorado Springs Switchbacks FC (loan)	15	1
19	Mueng Sunday	(Nigeria)	DF	March 1, 1994 (age 32)	2021	(United States) Des Moines Menace	9	0
20	Conor Donovan	(United States)	DF	January 8, 1996 (age 30)	2021	(United States) North Carolina FC	32	2
22	Zachary Ellis-Hayden	(Canada)	DF	March 1, 1992 (age 34)	2020	(United States) Fresno FC	37	1
28	Deklan Wynne	(New Zealand)	DF	March 20, 1995 (age 31)	2021	(United States) Phoenix Rising FC (loan)	14	4
Midfielders
6	Brad Dunwell	(United States)	MF	December 31, 1996 (age 29)	2020	(United States) Rio Grande Valley FC	35	0
7	Seyi Adekoya	(United States)	FW	December 5, 1995 (age 30)	2021	(United States) Phoenix Rising FC (loan)	12	1
8	Hiroki Kurimoto	(Japan)	MF	June 16, 1990 (age 36)	2021	(United States) Colorado Springs Switchbacks FC	32	1
9	Jaime Chavez	(United States)	FW	July 17, 1987 (age 39)	2020	(United States) Fresno FC	42	5
10	Arun Basuljevic	(United States)	MF	December 17, 1995 (age 30)	2020	(United States) Fresno FC	41	1
11	Frank López	(Cuba)	FW	February 25, 1995 (age 31)	2020	(United States) San Antonio FC	20	3
12	Irakoze Donasiyano	(Tanzania)	MF	February 3, 1998 (age 28)	2021	(United States) Nashville SC (loan)	14	0
13	Aidan Daniels	(Canada)	FW	September 6, 1998 (age 28)	2021	(United States) Colorado Springs Switchbacks FC	30	3
14	Charlie Ward	(England)	MF	February 19, 1995 (age 31)	2020	(Canada) Ottawa Fury	33	0
17	Jonathan Brown	(Wales)	FW	April 17, 1990 (age 36)	2019	(Bangladesh) Abahani Limited Dhaka	89	4
18	Tucker Stephenson	(United States)	FW	October 23, 1996 (age 29)	2020	(United States) Swope Park Rangers	42	3
21	Villyan Bijev	(Bulgaria)	FW	January 3, 1993 (age 33)	2021	(United States) Sacramento Republic FC	31	12
24	Kodai Iida	(Japan)	FW	December 6, 1994 (age 31)	2020	(Canada) HFX Wanderers FC	23	0

== Non-competitive ==
=== Preseason ===
March 19, 2021 Friendly	Austin FC	5–1	OKC Energy	Austin, Texas
11AM CST	Argudo 43'; Manneh 54'; Redes; Hoesen (o.g.)	Report	López 20'	Stadium: Lewis–Chen Family Field; Attendance: 0

March 20, 2021 Friendly	FC Dallas	4–0	OKC Energy FC	Frisco, Texas
2:00PM CDT (UTC-05)	Vargas 9' (Acosta); ElMedkhar; Pepi 74', 84' (Roberts)	Report		Stadium: Camry Field at Toyota Stadium
Note: Played in three 30-minute periods

April 6, 2021 Friendly	Houston Dynamo	2–0	OKC Energy	Houston, Texas
12:00 PM CDT	Rodríguez 11'; Bajamich 42'	Report		Stadium: Aveva Stadium

April 10, 2021 Friendly	OKC Energy FC	3–1	North Texas SC	Oklahoma City, OK
2:00 PM CDT	Frank Lopez 20'; Villyan Bijev 55'; Mitch Osmond 75'	Report		Stadium: Taft Stadium

April 14, 2021 Friendly	OKC Energy FC	0–1	Austin Bold FC	Oklahoma City, OK
11:00 AM CDT		Report		Stadium: Taft Stadium

April 14, 2021 Friendly	OKC Energy FC	3–1	USAO	Oklahoma City, OK
11:00 AM CDT	Tucker Stephenson; Daniels; Villyan Bijev	Report		Stadium: Taft Stadium

== Competitions ==
=== USL ===
==== Standings ====
Pos	Team	Pld	W	L	T	GF	GA	GD	Pts	Qualification
1	Louisville City FC	32	18	7	7	61	37	+24	61	Advance to USL Championship Playoffs
2	Birmingham Legion FC	32	18	8	6	51	31	+20	60	Advance to USL Championship Playoffs
3	Memphis 901 FC	32	14	10	8	47	42	+5	50	Advance to USL Championship Playoffs
4	FC Tulsa	32	14	13	5	49	48	+1	47	Advance to USL Championship Playoffs
5	OKC Energy FC	32	8	11	13	30	38	−8	37	
6	Indy Eleven	32	9	15	8	32	47	−15	35	
7	Atlanta United 2	32	8	14	10	47	56	−9	34 (Note: The USL awarded a 3–0 win to Atlanta United 2 after Sporting Kansas City II fielded Jake Davis who was an ineligible player. The original score was 1–0 for Sporting Kansas City II.)	
8	Sporting Kansas City II	32	4	20	8	33	64	−31	20	

Source: USL

==== Results summary ====
Overall								Home						Away					
Pld	W	D	L	GF	GA	GD	Pts	W	D	L	GF	GA	GD	W	D	L	GF	GA	GD
32	8	13	11	30	38	−8	37	4	8	4	15	13	+2	4	5	7	15	25	−10

Source: USLC standings

==== Results by round ====
Round	1	2	3	4	5	6	7	8	9	10	11	12	13	14	15	16	17	18	19	20	21	22	23	24	25	26	27	28	29	30	31	32
Stadium	H	H	A	H	A	H	A	H	A	H	A	H	A	A	H	A	H	A	A	H	H	A	A	H	A	H	H	H	A	H	A	A
Result	L	L	D	D	L	D	D	L	W	W	W	D	L	W	D	L	W	D	L	D	W	W	L	D	D	W	D	L	D	D	L	L

Source: Energy FC schedule
A = Away; H = Home; W = Win; D = Draw; L = Loss

==== Match results ====
April 24 1	OKC Energy	1–3	FC Tulsa	Oklahoma City, OK
7:30 PM CDT	Conor Donovan 76'	Report	Joaquin Rivas 29', 36'; Jorge Corrales (yellow card) 42'; Bradley Bourgeois (yellow card) 57'; Raphael Ayagwa (yellow card) 64'; Matt Sheldon (yellow card) 75'; Darío Suárez 87'	Stadium: Taft Stadium; Attendance: 3,380; Referee: Ismir Pekmic

May 1 2	OKC Energy	0–1	Atlanta United 2	Oklahoma City, OK
7:30 PM CDT		Report	Phillip Goodrum 62'; Brendan Lambe (yellow card) 90'	Stadium: Taft Stadium; Attendance: 2,229; Referee: Brandon Stevis

May 7 3	Sporting Kansas City II	1–1	OKC Energy	Kansas City, KS
7:00 PM CDT	Duke (yellow card) 41'; Rad (yellow card) 55'; Freeman 84'; Cisneros (yellow card) 90+1'	Report	Sunday (yellow card) 14'; Basuljevic (yellow card) 58'; Lopez 70', (red card) 90+4'; Iida (yellow card) 79'	Stadium: Children's Mercy Park; Referee: Jon Freemon

May 16 4	OKC Energy	2–2	Atlanta United 2	Oklahoma City, OK
5:00 PM CDT	Bijev 36'; Osmond 65'; Daniels (yellow card) 86'; Donovan (yellow card) 90+1'; Ward (yellow card) 90+2'	Report	Benítez 56'; McFadden (yellow card) 78'; Wolff 89'	Stadium: Taft Stadium; Attendance: 1,732; Referee: John Griggs

May 26 5	Birmingham Legion	1–0	OKC Energy	Birmingham, Al
7:00 PM CDT	Lapa 49'; Kleemann (yellow card) 51'	Report	Brown (yellow card) 16'	Stadium: BBVA Field; Referee: Matthew Thompson

May 29 6	OKC Energy	0–0	Memphis 901	Oklahoma City, OK
7:30 PM CDT	Dunwell (yellow card) 76'; Brown (yellow card) 86'	Report	Paul (yellow card) 8'; Dacres (yellow card) 72' (yellow-red card) 89'; Salazar (yellow card) 90+1'	Stadium: Taft Stadium; Attendance: 2,102; Referee: Matthew Corrigan

June 2 7	Indy Eleven	1–1	OKC Energy	Indianapolis, IN
6:00 PM CDT	Moon 42'	Report	Daniels (yellow card) 65'; López 69'	Stadium: Michael A. Carroll Stadium; Attendance: 3,999; Referee: Calin Radosav

June 12 8	OKC Energy	1–2	Birmingham Legion	Oklahoma City, OK
7:30 PM CDT	Bijev (yellow card) 50', (goal) 73' (pen.)	Report	Brett 3'; Asiedu (yellow card) 37'; James (yellow card) 66'; Oekel (yellow card) 73'; Williams 83'	Stadium: Taft Stadium; Attendance: 2,049; Referee: Mark Allatin

June 19 9	Memphis 901	0–1	OKC Energy	Memphis, TN
7:30 PM CDT	Oduro (yellow card) 8'; Fortune (yellow card) 60'	Report	Bijev 18'; Ellis-Hayden (yellow card) 30'; Coronado (yellow card) 49' (yellow-red card) 90'; Basuljevic (yellow card) 64'; Ward (yellow card) 77'	Stadium: AutoZone Park; Attendance: 5,265; Referee: Elvis Osmanovic

June 23 10	OKC Energy	1–0	Sporting Kansas City II	Oklahoma City, OK
7:30 PM CDT	Bijev (penalty missed) 45+1, 45+1'; Ellis-Hayden (yellow card) 90+4'	Report	Barbir (yellow card) 90'	Stadium: Taft Stadium; Attendance: 1,721; Referee: Greg Dopka

June 27 11	Atlanta United 2	1–2	OKC Energy	Atlanta, GA
6:30 PM CDT	Benítez 49'; Reilly (yellow card) 65'; Mertz (yellow card) 84'	Report	Ellis-Hayden (yellow card) 40'; Stephenson 71'; Donovan 78'; Cochran (yellow card) 90+5'	Stadium: Fifth Third Bank Stadium; Attendance: 755; Referee: Jervis Atagana

July 2 12	OKC Energy	0–0	FC Tulsa	Oklahoma City, OK
7:30 PM CDT	Stephenson (yellow card) 90+2'	Report	Ayagwa (yellow card) 42'; Winters (yellow card) 74'	Stadium: Taft Stadium; Attendance: 2,673; Referee: Matthew Thompson

July 14 13	Louisville City FC	3–1	OKC Energy	Louisville, KY
6:30 PM CDT	Charpie 14'; McMahon (yellow card) 19'; Lancaster 41'; Gomez (yellow card) 46'; Bone 55'; Charpie (yellow card) 62'; DelPiccolo (yellow card) 78'	Report	Donovan (yellow card) 14'; Ward (yellow card) 57'; Bijev 61'	Stadium: Lynn Family Stadium; Attendance: 10,032; Referee: Thomas Snyder

July 17 14	FC Tulsa	1–2	OKC Energy	Tulsa, OK
7:00 PM CDT	Corrales (yellow card) 14'; Suárez (yellow card) 25' da Costa (yellow card) 63', (goal) 90+1'	Report	Ward (yellow card) 39'; López 65'; Osmond (yellow card) 89'; Kurimoto 90+6'	Stadium: ONEOK Field; Attendance: 5,009; Referee: Brad Jensen

July 24 15	OKC Energy	0–0	Sporting Kansas City II	Oklahoma City, OK
7:30 PM CDT	Rogers (yellow card) 30'	Report	Duke (yellow card) 27'	Stadium: Taft Stadium; Attendance: 2,171; Referee: Matthew Franz

July 31 16	Louisville City FC	2–1	OKC Energy	Louisville, KY
6:30 PM CDT	Donovan 37' (o.g.); Wynder (yellow card) 45'; Lancaster 76' (pen.); Gómez (yellow card) 90+2'	Report	Bijev 87' (pen.)	Stadium: Lynn Family Stadium; Attendance: 10,602; Referee: Adam Kilpatrick

August 7 17	OKC Energy	4–1	Memphis 901 FC	Oklahoma City, OK
7:30 PM CDT	Daniels 40', 45'; Brown (yellow card) 54'; Osmond (yellow card) 69'; Bijev 73'; Dunwell (yellow card) 90+2'; Stephenson 90+4'	Report	Logue (yellow card) 13'; Kissiedou (red card) 24'; Murphy 49'; Paul (yellow card) 61'; Morton (yellow card) 85'	Stadium: Taft Stadium; Attendance: 2,183; Referee: Kevin Broadley

August 11 18	Atlanta United 2	2–2	OKC Energy	Atlanta, GA
6:30 PM CDT	Bauer (yellow card) 38'; Wiley (yellow card) 56'; Campbell (yellow card) 64'; Mertz 67'; Mejia 90+3'	Report	Bijev 39' (pen.), 76'; Wynne (yellow card) 60'; Chávez (yellow card) 90+5'	Stadium: Fifth Third Bank Stadium; Referee: Kyle Johnston

August 14 19	Indy Eleven	2–1	OKC Energy	Indianapolis, IN
6:00 PM CDT	Sissoko (yellow card) 10'; Law 26'; Artega 53', (yellow card) 90+3'; Wild (yellow card) 90+4'	Report	Batista 36'; Adekoya (yellow card) 45'	Stadium: Michael A. Carroll Stadium; Attendance: 5,999; Referee: Joshua Encarnacion

August 22 20	OKC Energy	0–0	Louisville City FC	Oklahoma City, OK
5:00 PM CDT	Ellis-Hayden (yellow card) 45+3'	Report	J. Wynder (yellow card) 53'	Stadium: Taft Stadium; Attendance: 1,993; Referee: Calin Radosav

August 29 21	OKC Energy	2–1	Rio Grande Valley FC	Oklahoma City, OK
5:00 PM CDT	Chavez 26'; Osmond (yellow card) 35'; Basuljevic 78'; Donovan (yellow card) 84'	Report	Amoh 31'	Stadium: Taft Stadium; Attendance: 1,645; Referee: Elvis Osmanovic

September 1 22	Memphis 901 FC	0–1	OKC Energy	Memphis, TN
7:00 PM CDT	Fortune (yellow card) 8'; Logue (yellow card) 70'	Report	Batista (yellow card) 19'; Ellis-Hayden (red card) 24'; Bijev 47'; Cochran (yellow card) 90+1'	Stadium: AutoZone Park; Attendance: 3,816; Referee: Gabriele Giusti

September 4 23	Sporting Kansas City II	3–0	OKC Energy	Kanas City, KS
4:00 PM CDT	Cisneros 20', (yellow card) 58'; R. Smith 72'; Mushagalusa 79'; Davis (yellow card) 87'	Report	Batista (yellow card) 56'	Stadium: Children's Mercy Park; Referee: Malik Badawi

September 12 24	OKC Energy	1–1	Louisville City FC	Oklahoma City, OK
5:00 PM CDT	Ellis-Hayden 25'; Batista (yellow card) 65'	Report	DelPiccolo 45+5', (yellow card) 62'; Davis IV (yellow card) 63'	Stadium: Taft Stadium; Attendance: 1,579; Referee: Matthew Thompson

September 18 25	Birmingham Legion FC	1–1	OKC Energy	Birmingham, AL
6:30 PM CDT	Flemmings (yellow card) 47'; Lopez 55'	Report	Kurimoto (yellow card) 35'; Bijev 39'; Batista (yellow card) 65'; Ellis-Hayden (yellow card) 81'	Stadium: BBVA Field; Referee: Matthew Franz

September 26 26	OKC Energy	2–0	Indy Eleven	Oklahoma City, OK
5:00 PM CDT	Chavez 30'; Daniels 74'; Kurimoto (yellow card) 90+2'	Report	Seagrist (yellow card) 23'; Gutjahr (yellow card) 45+2'; Koffie (yellow card) 70'; Sissoko (yellow card) 90+4'	Stadium: Taft Stadium; Attendance: 1,960; Referee: Kevin Broadley

September 29 27	OKC Energy	1–1	Indy Eleven	Oklahoma City, OK
7:30 PM CDT	Chavez (yellow card) 28'; Batista (yellow card) 64'; Cochran (yellow card) 82'; Adekoya 87'; Bijev (yellow card) 90+3'	Report	Arteaga 12', (yellow card) 66', (penalty missed) 82'; Edwards (yellow card) 90+3'	Stadium: Taft Stadium; Attendance: 3,677; Referee: John Matto

October 3 28	OKC Energy	0–1	San Antonio FC	Oklahoma City, OK
5:00 PM CDT	Kurimoto (yellow card) 31'; Batista (yellow card) 54'; Bijev (yellow card) 86'	Report	Taintor (yellow card) 34'; Epps 66'; Gallegos (yellow card) 80'; Hopeau (yellow card) 90+4'	Stadium: Taft Stadium; Attendance: 1,828; Referee: Lukasz Szpala

October 10 29	Austin Bold FC	1–1	OKC Energy	Austin, TX
8:00 PM CDT	Walls (yellow card) 45+1'; Báez 90+2' (pen.)	Report	Bijev 83'	Stadium: Bold Stadium; Attendance: 1,028; Referee: Ricardo Fierro

October 17 30	OKC Energy	0–0	Birmingham Legion FC	Oklahoma City, OK
5:00 PM CDT	Osmond (yellow card) 90+3'; Chavez (yellow card) 90+5'	Report	A. Crognale (yellow card) 52'; Asiedu (yellow card) 88'; Lopez (yellow card) 90+2'; Kavita (yellow card) 90+4'	Stadium: Taft Stadium; Attendance: 3,246; Referee: Jeremy Scheer

October 24 31	El Paso Locomotive FC	4–0	OKC Energy	El Paso, TX
7:00 PM CDT	Gómez 40', 44'; King 42', 45+3', (yellow card) 45+4'; Bahner (yellow card) 57'	Report		Stadium: Southwest University Park; Attendance: 8,011; Referee: Benjamin Meyer

October 30 32	FC Tulsa	2–0	OKC Energy	Tulsa, OK
7:00 PM CDT	Rivas 11'; Jadama (yellow card) 68'; Marlon 82'	Report	Chavez (yellow card) 71'	Stadium: ONEOK Field; Attendance: 4,053; Referee: Michael Radchuk

== Statistics ==
=== Appearances and goals ===
No.	Pos.	Name	USL		Total	
No.	Pos.	Name	Apps	Goals	Apps	Goals
1	GK	(United States) C.J. Cochran	31	0	31	0
3	DF	(United States) Rob Coronado	12	0	12	0
4	DF	(United States) Mitch Osmond	32	32	32	1
6	MF	(United States) Brad Dunwell	22	0	22	0
7	FW	(United States) Seyi Adekoya	12	1	12	1
8	MF	(Japan) Hiroki Kurimoto	32	1	32	1
9	FW	(United States) Jaime Chavez	26	1	26	1
10	MF	(United States) Arun Basuljevic	28	1	28	1
12	MF	(United States) Irakoze Donasiyano	14	0	14	0
13	FW	(Canada) Aidan Daniels	30	3	30	3
14	MF	(England) Charlie Ward	23	1	23	1
15	DF	(United States) Lamar Batista	15	1	15	1
17	FW	(Wales) Jonathan Brown	23	0	23	0
18	FW	(United States) Tucker Stephenson	31	2	31	2
19	DF	(Nigeria) Mueng Sunday	9	0	9	0
20	DF	(United States) Conor Donovan	32	2	32	2
21	FW	(Bulgaria) Villyan Bijev	31	12	31	12
22	DF	(Canada) Zachary Ellis-Hayden	22	1	22	1
24	FW	(Japan) Kodai Iida	16	0	16	0
28	DF	(New Zealand) Deklan Wynne	14	0	14	0
35	GK	(United States) Kyle Ihn	1	0	1	0
Players who left the club during the season:
5	DF	(United States) Sam Rogers	12	0	12	0
7	MF	(Haiti) Groutchov Pierre	1	0	1	0
11	FW	(Cuba) Frank López	14	3	14	3

Source: Energy FC stats

=== Disciplinary record ===
No.	Pos.	Name	USL		Total	
No.	Pos.	Name	Booked	Sent off (straight red)	Booked	Sent off (straight red)
1	GK	(United States) C.J. Cochran	3	0	3	0
3	DF	(United States) Rob Coronado	1	1	1	1
4	DF	(United States) Mitch Osmond	4	0	4	0
6	MF	(United States) Brad Dunwell	2	0	2	0
7	FW	(United States) Seyi Adekoya	1	0	1	0
8	MF	(Japan) Hiroki Kurimoto	3	0	3	0
9	FW	(United States) Jaime Chavez	4	0	4	0
10	MF	(United States) Arun Basuljevic	2	0	2	0
11	FW	(Cuba) Frank López	0	1	0	1
13	FW	(Canada) Aidan Daniels	2	0	2	0
14	MF	(England) Charlie Ward	4	0	4	0
15	DF	(United States) Lamar Batista	6	0	6	0
17	FW	(Wales) Jonathan Brown	3	0	3	0
18	FW	(United States) Tucker Stephenson	1	0	1	0
19	DF	(Nigeria) Mueng Sunday	1	0	1	0
20	DF	(United States) Conor Donovan	3	0	3	0
21	FW	(Bulgaria) Villyan Bijev	3	0	3	0
22	DF	(Canada) Zachary Ellis-Hayden	5	1	5	1
24	FW	(Japan) Kodai Iida	1	0	1	0
28	DF	(New Zealand) Deklan Wynne	1	0	1	0

Source: Energy FC stats

=== Clean sheets ===
No.	Name	USL	Total	Games Played
1	(United States) C.J. Cochran	31	9	31
35	(United States) Kyle Ihn	1	0	1
23	(United States) Sam Howard	0	0	0

Source: Energy FC stats

== Transfers ==
=== Loan in ===
Pos.	Player	Parent club	Length/Notes	Beginning	End	Source
DF	(New Zealand) Deklan Wynne	(United States) Phoenix Rising FC	On a match-by-match basis.	Jul 1, 2021		

== See also ==
- OKC Energy FC
- 2021 in American soccer
- 2021 USL Championship season
