= 2020 San Diego Loyal SC season =

San Diego Loyal SC
2020 season
- Executive VP: Landon Donovan
- Manager: Landon Donovan
- USL Championship: Group B: 4th Western Conf.: 10th
- USLC Playoffs: Did not qualify
- U.S. Open Cup: Cancelled
- Highest home attendance: 6,100 (March 7 vs. LV)
- Average home league attendance: 6,100
- Biggest win: LA 0–3 SD (Sept. 9)
- Biggest defeat: SD 0–2 OC (Aug. 12); PHX 2–0 SD (Aug. 15); SD 1–3 RNO (Aug. 22)
Home colors	Away colors

The 2020 San Diego Loyal SC season was the club's first season of existence and their first season in the USL Championship (USLC). This article covers the period from the founding of the club to the conclusion of the 2020 USLC Playoff Final, scheduled for November 12–16, 2020.

== Roster ==
As of March 6, 2020

No.	Position	Nation	Player
2	DF	(United States) USA	Morgan Hackworth
3	MF	(United States) USA	Elijah Martin
4	MF	(England) ENG	Jack Metcalf
5	DF	(United States) USA	Grant Stoneman
6	MF	(England) ENG	Charlie Adams
7	MF	(United States) USA	Carlos Alvarez
8	DF	(United States) USA	Sal Zizzo
9	FW	(Nigeria) NGA	Qudus Lawal
11	FW	(United States) USA	Irvin Parra
12	DF	(United States) USA	Eric Avila
14	MF	(Panama) PAN	Yair Jaen
15	FW	(South Africa) RSA	Tumi Moshobane
16	MF	(Democratic Republic of the Congo) COD	Beverly Makangila
17	MF	(United States) USA	Collin Martin
18	DF	(Mexico) MEX	Edwin Lara
19	MF	(Cameroon) CMR	Jerome Mbekeli
20	DF	(United States) USA	Joseph Greenspan
21	FW	(Mauritius) MRI	Ashley Nazira
22	FW	(Ghana) GHA	Francis Atuahene (on loan from FC Dallas)
23	DF	(Montenegro) MNE	Emrah Klimenta
24	GK	(United States) USA	Jake Fenlason
26	MF	(Sierra Leone) SLE	Suleiman Samura
28	GK	(United States) USA	Jon Kempin (on loan from Columbus Crew)
40	MF	(Mexico) MEX	Raúl Mendiola
—	GK	(Jamaica) JAM	Amal Knight

== Competitions ==
=== Exhibitions ===
February 2 Preseason 1	San Diego Loyal SC	1–0	FC Dallas	Chula Vista, California
12:00 PM PDT	Atuahene	Report; Report		Stadium: Chula Vista Training Center

February 22 Preseason 2	San Diego Loyal SC (United States)	1–0	(Panama) Costa del Este FC	San Diego, California
8:00 PM PST	Metcalf 44'; Parra (red card) 60'	Report		Stadium: Torero Stadium

February 29 Preseason 3	Reno 1868 FC	2–4	San Diego Loyal SC	Reno, Nevada
12:00 PM PST	Hertzog 44', 49'	Report	7'; 24'; 30'; 75'	Stadium: Greater Nevada Field

March 28 Midseason 1	San Diego Loyal SC (United States)	Cancelled	(Mexico) Club Tijuana	San Diego, California
7:00 PM PDT				Stadium: Torero Stadium
Note: Canceled due to the COVID-19 pandemic

=== USL Championship ===
Round	1	2	3	4	5	6	7	8	9	10	11	12	13	14	15	16
Stadium	H	A	A	H	H	A	H	A	H	A	A	A	A	H	A	H
Result	D	W	W	L	W	D	L	L	L							
Position	5	1	1	2	1	2	2	8	10							

Updated to match(es) played on August 22, 2020. Source: Match reports
A = Away; H = Home; W = Win; D = Draw; L = Loss

==== Match results ====
On January 9, 2020, the USL announced the 2020 season schedule.

March 7 1	San Diego Loyal SC	1–1	Las Vegas Lights FC	San Diego, California
7:00 PM PST	Adams 15'; Stoneman (yellow card) 90+3'	Report	Burgos 4'; Sandoval (yellow card) 29'; Torre (yellow card) 55'	Stadium: Torero Stadium; Attendance: 6,100; Referee: Elton Garcia

March 11 2	Tacoma Defiance	1–2	San Diego Loyal SC	Tacoma, Washington
7:00 PM PDT	Mueller (yellow card) 38'; Dhillon 56'	Report	Atuahene 31', 85', (yellow card) 89'; Stoneman (yellow card) 57'; Kempin (yellow card) 90+2'	Stadium: Cheney Stadium; Attendance: 0 Referee: Luis Guardia
Note: Played behind closed doors due to the COVID-19 pandemic.

July 11 3	Real Monarchs	0–1	San Diego Loyal SC	Sandy, Utah
1:00 PM PDT	R. Sierakowski (yellow card) 57'	Report	Stoneman 17'; Avila (yellow card) 40'; Zizzo (yellow card) 63'; C. Martin (yellow card) 77'; Alvarez (yellow card) 90+7'	Stadium: Rio Tinto Stadium; Attendance: 0 Referee: Brad Jensen

July 19 4	San Diego Loyal SC	0–1	LA Galaxy II	San Diego, California
7:00 PM PDT	C. Martin (yellow card) 22'; E. Martin (yellow card) 66'; Makangila (yellow card) 82'; Jaen (yellow card) 87'	Report	Hernandez (yellow card) 41'; Vázquez 72', (yellow card) 90'	Stadium: Torero Stadium; Attendance: 0 Referee: Ricardo Fierro

July 25 5	San Diego Loyal SC	2–1	Las Vegas Lights FC	San Diego, California
7:00 PM PDT	Moshobane 9'; Adams (yellow card) 54'; Parra 65'; Kempin (yellow card) 81'	Report	Sandoval (yellow card) 17'; Dally 45+6'; Fenwick (yellow card) 84'	Stadium: Torero Stadium; Attendance: 0 Referee: Joseph Salinas

July 29 6	LA Galaxy II	P–P	San Diego Loyal SC	Carson, California
7:00 PM PDT				Stadium: Dignity Health Sports Park
Note: Match postponed due to multiple positive covid-19 tests in team organizations.

August 1 7	San Diego Loyal SC	0–0	Sacramento Republic FC	San Diego, California
7:00 PM PDT	Spencer (yellow card) 41'; Klimenta (yellow card) 66'; Avila (yellow card) 85'	Report	Wheeler-Omiunu (yellow card) 55'; Hilliard-Arce (yellow card) 71'; Skundrich (yellow card) 88'; Iwasa (yellow card) 90+3'	Stadium: Torero Stadium; Attendance: 0 Referee: Alejandro Mariscal

August 8 8	Las Vegas Lights FC	P–P	San Diego Loyal SC	Las Vegas, Nevada
7:30 PM PDT				Stadium: Cashman Field; Attendance: 0
Note: Match postponed due to a positive COVID-19 test in the Las Vegas Lights organization.

August 12 9	San Diego Loyal SC	0–2	Orange County SC	San Diego, California
7:00 PM PDT	Alvarez (yellow card) 28'; Klimenta (yellow card) 56'; Moshobane (yellow card) 76'	Report	Quinn (yellow card) 53', (goal) 84'; Okoli 65'; Alvarado (yellow card) 90+1'	Stadium: Torero Stadium; Attendance: 0 Referee: Brandon Stevis

August 15 10	Phoenix Rising FC	2–0	San Diego Loyal SC	Scottsdale, Arizona
6:30 PM PDT	Flemmings 26'; King 59'	Report	C. Martin (yellow card) 44'; Klimenta (yellow card) 56'; Nazira (yellow card) 82'	Stadium: Casino Arizona Field; Attendance: 0 Referee: Isaiah Vlad

August 22 11	San Diego Loyal SC	1–3	Reno 1868 FC	San Diego, California
7:00 PM PDT	Stoneman (yellow card) 37'; Alvarez 66'	Report	Langsdorf 24'; Bone 62'; Apodaca 85'	Stadium: Torero Stadium; Attendance: 0 Referee: Ricardo Fierro

August 29 12	Orange County SC	0–0	San Diego Loyal SC	Irvine, California
7:00 PM PDT	Palmer (yellow card) 58'; Crisostomo (yellow card) 90+7'	Report	Stoneman (yellow card) 22'; C. Martin (yellow card) 42'; Adams (yellow card) 45+6'	Stadium: Championship Soccer Stadium; Attendance: 0 Referee: Samantha Martinez

September 2 8	Las Vegas Lights FC	1–1	San Diego Loyal SC	Las Vegas, Nevada
7:30 PM PDT	Billingsley (yellow card) 69'; Frischknecht 73'; Torre (yellow card) 90+5'	Report	C. Martin (yellow card) 53', (goal) 57'; Stoneman (yellow card) 72'	Stadium: Cashman Field; Attendance: 0 Referee: Jonathan Bilinski

September 9 13	LA Galaxy II	0–3	San Diego Loyal SC	Carson, California
7:00 PM PDT	Alvarado Jr. (yellow card) 48' (yellow-red card) 65'; Cuevas (yellow card) 63'; Vera (yellow card) 69'	Report	Berry 1', 38'; Rubín 20'; Metcalf (yellow card) 61'	Stadium: Dignity Health Sports Park; Attendance: 0 Referee: Michael Radchuk
Note: Re-schedule of postponed match from July 29.

September 13 14	San Diego Loyal SC	2–0	Orange County SC	San Diego, California
7:00 PM PDT	Stoneman (yellow card) 9'; Berry (yellow card) 22'; Guido 41', 64'; Tarek Morad (yellow card) 45+2'; Alvarez (yellow card) 82'; Adams (yellow card) 86'; Spencer (yellow card) 90+5'	Report	Kiernan (yellow card) 22'; Quinn (yellow card) 72'	Stadium: Torero Stadium; Attendance: 0 Referee: Ricardo Fierro

September 19 15	Phoenix Rising FC	2–3	San Diego Loyal SC	Scottsdale, Arizona
7:30 PM PDT	Flemmings 41' 89'; Barmby (yellow card) 90+2'	Report	Rubin 3', 12', 45+4'; Stoneman (yellow card) 32' (yellow-red card) 90+7'; Klimenta (yellow card) 54'; Moshobane (yellow card) 63'; Metcalf (yellow card) 72'; C. Martin (yellow card) 87'	Stadium: Casino Arizona Field; Attendance: 0 Referee: Farhad Dadkho

September 23 6	LA Galaxy II	1–1	San Diego Loyal SC	Carson, California
7:00 PM PDT	Neal (yellow card) 22'; Cuevas (yellow card) 37'; Vázquez (yellow card) 60'; Hernandez (yellow card) 69'; Ontiveros (yellow card) 72', (red card) 90+8'; Alvarado Jr. 90+1'	Report	C. Martin (yellow card) 27'; Klimenta (yellow card) 38'; Rubín 42' (pen.); Adams (yellow card) 58'; E. Martin (yellow card) 82' (yellow-red card) 89'; Spencer (yellow card) 90+5'	Stadium: Dignity Health Sports Park; Attendance: 0 Referee: William Hoffman
Note: Re-schedule of postponed July 29th match.

September 30 16	San Diego Loyal SC	0–3 (Forfeit)	Phoenix Rising FC	San Diego, California
7:00 PM PDT	Berry 2'; Rubín 20', 45+7'; Stoneman (yellow card) 31'; C. Martin (red card) 45+8'	Report	Stanton (yellow card) 27', (goal) 45'; Calistri (yellow card) 28'; Moar (yellow card) 45+5'; Farrell (yellow card) 45+6'	Stadium: Torero Stadium; Attendance: 0 Referee: Joseph Salinas
Note: Match abandoned at start of second half due to Loyal walking off the pitch in protest of an alleged homophobic slur. According to the FIFA disciplinary code, the match was forfeited and Phoenix was awarded a 3–0 victory.

==== Standings — Group B ====
Pos	Team	Pld	W	D	L	GF	GA	GD	Pts	PPG	Qualification
1	Phoenix Rising FC	16	11	2	3	46	17	+29	35	2.19	Advance to USL Championship Playoffs
2	LA Galaxy II	16	8	2	6	29	32	−3	26	1.63	Advance to USL Championship Playoffs
3	Orange County SC	16	7	3	6	18	18	0	24	1.50	
4	San Diego Loyal SC	16	6	5	5	17	18	−1	23	1.44	
5	Las Vegas Lights FC	16	2	5	9	24	34	−10	11	0.69	

Source: USL

==== Standings — Western Conference ====
Pos	Team	Pld	W	L	T	GF	GA	GD	Pts	PPG	Qualification
1	Reno 1868 FC	16	11	2	3	43	21	+22	36	2.25	Conference Quarterfinals
2	Phoenix Rising FC	16	11	3	2	46	17	+29	35	2.19	Conference Quarterfinals
3	San Antonio FC	16	10	3	3	30	14	+16	33	2.06	Conference Quarterfinals
4	El Paso Locomotive FC	16	9	2	5	24	14	+10	32	2.00	Conference Quarterfinals
5	Sacramento Republic	16	8	2	6	27	17	+10	30	1.88	Conference Quarterfinals
6	New Mexico United	15	8	4	3	23	17	+6	27	1.80	Conference Quarterfinals
7	FC Tulsa	15	6	2	7	21	16	+5	25	1.67	Conference Quarterfinals
8	LA Galaxy II	16	8	6	2	29	32	−3	26	1.63	Conference Quarterfinals
9	Orange County SC	16	7	6	3	18	18	0	24	1.50	
10	San Diego Loyal SC	16	6	5	5	17	18	−1	23	1.44	
11	Austin Bold FC	16	5	4	7	30	26	+4	22	1.38	
12	Tacoma Defiance	16	4	10	2	25	32	−7	14	0.88	
13	Colorado Springs Switchbacks	16	2	7	7	19	28	−9	13	0.81	
14	Real Monarchs	16	3	11	2	14	25	−11	11	0.69	
15	Las Vegas Lights FC	16	2	9	5	24	34	−10	11	0.69	
16	Rio Grande Valley Toros	14	2	9	3	17	28	−11	9	0.64	
17	OKC Energy FC	16	1	8	7	12	29	−17	10	0.63	
18	Portland Timbers 2	16	3	13	0	20	50	−30	9	0.56	

Source: USL Championship
Rules for classification: 1) points per game; 2) points; 3) total wins; 4) total goal differential; 5) total goals scored; 6) disciplinary points; 7) coin toss or drawing of lots.

=== U.S. Open Cup ===
As a USL Championship club, San Diego was set to enter the competition in the Second Round, to be played April 7–9. The second round draw had the Loyal slated to play an away match versus Los Angeles Force scheduled for April 7. Before the match could occur, however, U.S. Soccer suspended the competition on March 13 due to the COVID-19 pandemic, before cancelling the competition altogether on August 17.

April 7 2nd round	Los Angeles Force (California)	Cancelled	(California) San Diego Loyal SC	Los Angeles, California
PDT				Stadium: Jesse Owens Stadium (Cal State LA)
Note: Match postponed due to the COVID-19 pandemic
