= Samura =

Samura is both a surname and a given name. Notable people with the name include:

- Hiroaki Samura (沙村 広明, born 1970), Japanese manga artist
- Kabba Samura (born 1981), Sierra Leonean footballer
- Kaichiro Samura (佐村 嘉一郎, 1880–1964), Japanese judoka
- Samura Kamara (born 1951), Sierra Leonean politician and economist
- Samura ibn Jundab (died 670s), companion of Muhammad
- Sorious Samura (born 1963), Sierra Leonean journalist
- Suleiman Samura (born 1997), Sierra Leonean footballer
