= Miguel Berry =

Spanish footballer (born 1997)

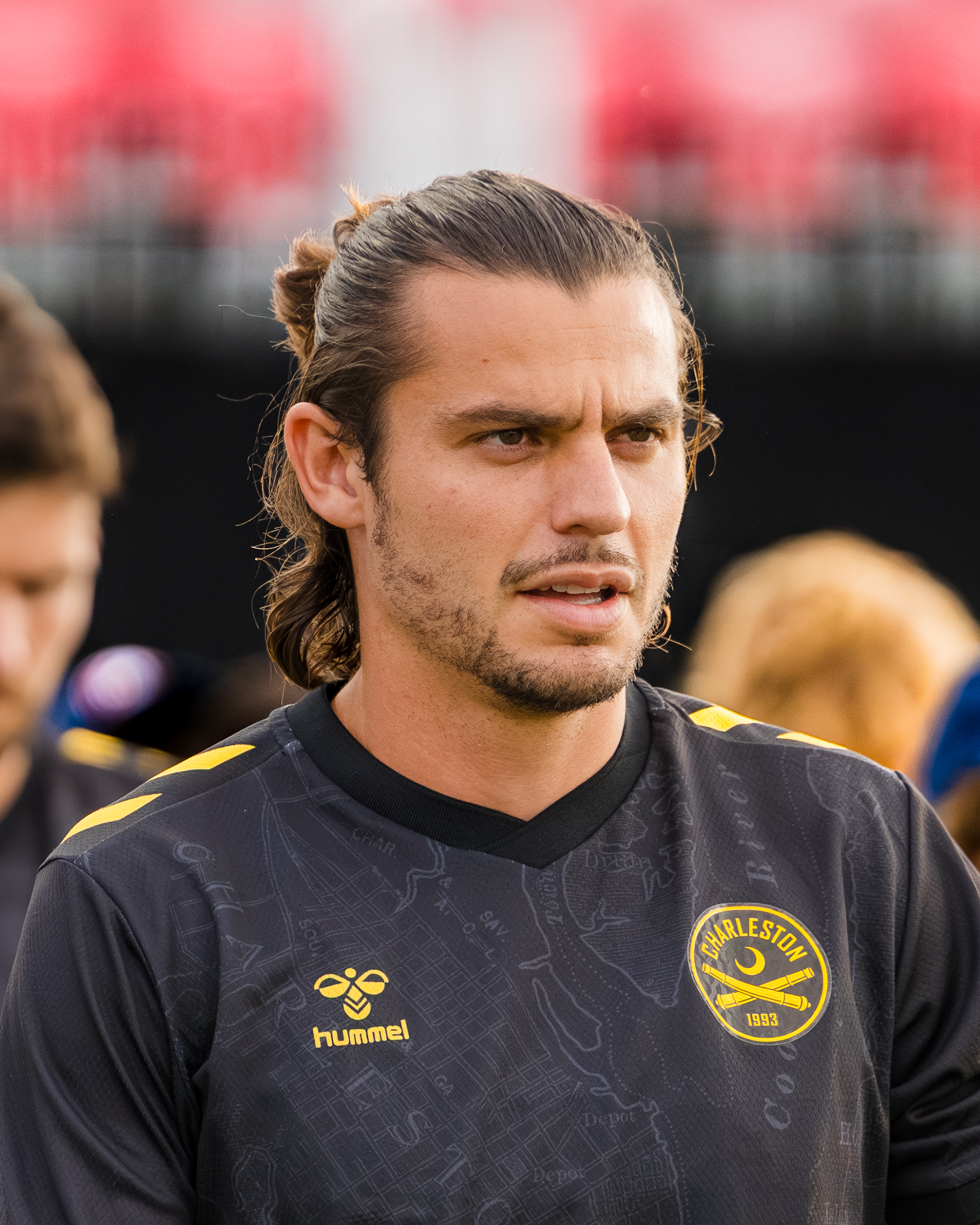
- Berry with the Charleston Battery in 2026

Personal information
- Full name: Miguel Berry
- Date of birth: 16 September 1997 (age 29)
- Place of birth: Barcelona, Spain
- Height: 6 ft 3 in (1.91 m)
- Position: Striker

Team information
- Current team: Charleston Battery
- Number: 90

Youth career
- San Diego SC
- –2016: San Diego Surf SC

College career
Years	Team	Apps	(Gls)
2016–2019	San Diego Toreros	72	(38)

Senior career*
Years	Team	Apps	(Gls)
2017	Seattle Sounders U-23	9	(2)
2018–2019	Orange County SC U-23	16	(7)
2020–2022	Columbus Crew	34	(10)
2020	→ San Diego Loyal (loan)	7	(3)
2021	→ San Diego Loyal (loan)	7	(3)
2022	D.C. United	14	(0)
2023	Atlanta United	27	(1)
2024–2025	LA Galaxy	48	(2)
2026–	Charleston Battery	30	(8)
- * Club domestic league appearances and goals as of November 4, 2026

Miguel Berry (born 16 September 1997) is a Spanish professional footballer who plays as a striker.

== Youth and amateur career ==
Berry was born in Barcelona, Spain to American parents. They moved back to the United States when Berry was eight-years old and Berry grew up in Poway, California, attending Poway High School. Berry also played with Development Academy side San Diego Surf until 2016, having also previously played for San Diego SC.

In 2016, Berry went to play college soccer at the University of San Diego. He played with the Toreros for four years, making 72 appearances, scoring 38 goals and tallying 16 assists. In his senior year, Berry was named the WCC Co-Player of the Year and he was a semifinalist for the MAC National Player of the Year award. He'd previously been named WCC All-Freshman Team in his freshman year, was named to the All-WCC First Team and All-Far West Region Second Team in his sophomore year and earned All-WCC First Team and USC All-Far West Region Second Team honors in his junior season.

While at college, Berry also played in the USL League Two for both Seattle Sounders U-23 and Orange County SC U-23.

== Professional career ==
=== Columbus Crew ===
On 9 January 2020, Berry was selected 7th overall in the 2020 MLS SuperDraft by Columbus Crew. He officially joined the club on 27 February 2020. After having made no appearances for the team during the first half of the season, and with a lack of future opportunities due to the cancellation of the U.S. Open Cup, Berry was loaned to San Diego Loyal of the USL Championship. Though Berry failed to make any appearances in his first season with the Crew, he was part of the squad that won the 2020 MLS Cup.

On 14 December 2020, the Crew announced that they had exercised the option to retain Berry for the 2021 season.

During the beginning of the 2021 season, Berry appeared in just one league game, playing only one minute. Seeing no opportunity on the horizon, Berry asked to be loaned back to the San Diego Loyal to get some playing time. The Columbus Crew recalled Berry in early July, due to starting striker Gyasi Zardes being called up to the Gold Cup. Berry went on to make 18 appearances, scoring 8 goals at a rate of 1 goal every 105 minutes.

==== Loan to San Diego Loyal ====
On 28 August 2020, Berry was loaned to USL Championship side San Diego Loyal for the remainder of the 2020 season. He made his debut the following day, starting in a 0–0 draw with Orange County SC. Berry played in all seven matches that he was available for the Loyal, scoring three goals. Notably, Berry was a part of the team that both forfeited and walked off the field for matches against Los Angeles Galaxy II and Phoenix Rising respectively, due to unpunished racist and homophobic slurs directed at teammates. These moves were widely applauded, however, they cost the team a spot in the 2020 playoffs.

On 28 May 2021, Berry re-joined the club on loan for the 2021 season. However, he was recalled early in July by Columbus.

=== D.C. United ===
On July 18, 2022, Berry was traded to D.C. United for $225,000 in General Allocation Money spread across 2 years; with an additional $100,000 able to be earned if Berry meets certain performance-based incentives.

=== LA Galaxy ===
On January 16, 2024, Berry was signed by LA Galaxy on a two-year contract with a club option for 2026. Scored two goals in 2024, to help keep the Galaxy undefeated at home before winning the club's sixth MLS Cup Championship. On 30 October 2025, the team announced that they had declined his contract option.

== Career statistics ==
Clubs	Season	League			Cup		Continental		Total	
Clubs	Season	Division	Apps	Goals	Apps	Goals	Apps	Goals	Apps	Goals
Columbus Crew	2020	Major League Soccer	0	0	— (Note: The 2020 U.S. Open Cup was not played due to the COVID-19 pandemic)		—		0	0
Columbus Crew	2021	Major League Soccer	18	8	— (Note: The 2021 U.S. Open Cup was not played due to the COVID-19 pandemic)		3 (Note: Includes 2 appearances in the CONCACAF Champions League and 1 appearance in 2021 Campeones Cup)	0	21	8
Columbus Crew	2022	Major League Soccer	16	2	1	0	0	0	16	2
Columbus Crew	Totals		34	10	1	0	3	0	38	10
San Diego Loyal (loan)	2020	USL Championship	7	3	—		—		7	3
San Diego Loyal (loan)	2021	USL Championship	7	3	—		—		7	3
San Diego Loyal (loan)	Totals		14	6	0	0	0	0	14	6
Career totals			48	16	1	0	3	0	52	16

== Honours ==
Columbus Crew

- MLS Cup: 2020
- Campeones Cup: 2021

LA Galaxy

- MLS Cup: 2024
