= Sam Strong (soccer) =

American soccer player

Personal information
- Full name: Samuel Erik Strong
- Date of birth: August 23, 1996 (age 30)
- Place of birth: Santa Barbara, California, United States
- Height: 6 ft 1 in (1.85 m)
- Position: Center-back

Team information
- Current team: Hougang United

Youth career
- Real So Cal

College career
Years	Team	Apps	(Gls)
2015–2016	UC Santa Barbara Gauchos	30	(2)
2017	Coastal Carolina Chanticleers	14	(0)

Senior career*
Years	Team	Apps	(Gls)
2017	Ventura County Fusion	12	(2)
2018–2019	Fresno FC	17	(0)
2020	Hartford Athletic	15	(2)
2021	Albion San Diego	16	(1)
2022	Monterey Bay	4	(0)
2022	→ Central Valley Fuego (loan)	15	(0)
2023	Central Valley Fuego	6	(0)
2023–2024	Rajpracha	23	(7)
2024	Dynamic Herb Cebu	9	(1)
2025	Life Sihanoukville	12	(2)
2025–	Hougang United	0	(0)

International career
2015	United States U23	2	(0)
- * Club domestic league appearances and goals as of 19 May 2025

Samuel Erik Strong (born August 23, 1996) is an American soccer player who plays primarily as a center-back for Singapore Premier League club Hougang United.

== Club career ==
=== College and amateur career ===
Born in Santa Barbara, Strong played youth soccer with Santa Barbara Soccer Club and Real So Cal. He also played one season of high school soccer with San Marcos High School in Santa Barbara where he graduated in 2014. Strong received a scholarship to play college soccer at UC Santa Barbara between 2015 and 2016, where he scored 2 goals in 30 appearances for the Gauchos. Strong later played one season of soccer at Coastal Carolina University in 2017.

While at college, Strong played with USL PDL side Ventura County Fusion in 2015 and 2017.

=== Professional ===
Strong signed with 2nd division USL Championship side Fresno FC on December 21, 2017, ahead of their inaugural season. He made his professional debut on July 25, 2018, starting in a 0–0 draw with Oklahoma City Energy. At the end of the 2018 USL Championship season, Fresno FC exercised a club option to acquire Strong for the 2019 season.

On December 2, 2019, Strong signed with Hartford Athletic another USL Championship side. During his time with Hartford Athletic, Strong was the 2020 club defender of the year as voted by the fans.

Strong signed with 3rd division National Independent Soccer Association club San Diego 1904 FC on August 6, 2021, he scored on his debut in a match vs Maryland Bobcats on August 8, 2021.

Strong was announced as a signing for 2nd division USL Championship expansion side Monterey Bay FC on February 14, 2022. Strong returned to Fresno on July 22, 2022, by way of a loan to Central Valley Fuego FC for the remainder of the 2022 USL League One season. His contract option was declined by Monterey Bay at the end of the season.

In January 2023, it was announced that Strong had signed with Central Valley Fuego on a permanent deal. In July 2023 Strong and Central Valley Fuego mutually parted ways. Later that month Strong signed a contract with Rajpracha FC of the Thai League 2, being the first time Strong has played for a team outside of the United States. Strong scored in his Thai FA Cup, Thai League Cup and Thai League debut. After an impressive season in Thailand, Strong signed with Dynamic Herb Cebu FC in August 2024 to compete in the AFC Champions League 2 and Philippines Football League. Strong started 5 games in the AFC Champions League 2.

On January 1 of 2025, Strong transferred from the Philippines to Life FC of the Cambodian Premier League.
