= Devann Yao =

American soccer player

Personal information
- Full name: Devann Grey Joseph Yao
- Date of birth: April 5, 1990 (age 36)
- Place of birth: New York City, New York, United States
- Height: 5 ft 10 in (1.78 m)
- Position: Midfielder

Youth career
- 2003–2007: Metz
- 2007–2008: Livorno
- 2008–2009: St Mirren

Senior career*
Years	Team	Apps	(Gls)
2010	Ipswich Town	0	(0)
2011–2013	Borinage	28	(4)
2013–2014	UR La Louvière Centre	12	(0)
2014–2015	TSG Neustrelitz	17	(5)
2015–2016	Kickers Offenbach	14	(0)
2016–2017	Berliner AK 07	23	(8)
2017–2018	SV Meppen	6	(0)
2018	Berliner AK 07	5	(3)
2019	Victoria Rosport	4	(2)
2019	Fresno FC	5	(0)
2020	FC Brandenburg 03	2	(0)
- * Club domestic league appearances and goals as of 17:02, 11 May 2020 (UTC)

Devann Grey Joseph Yao (born April 5, 1990) is an American soccer player who plays as a midfielder.

== Club career ==
Born in New York to an Ivorian father and Italian mother, Yao moved to Europe at a young age. He first joined FC Metz in France at age of 13. He spent four years in their youth system before joining AS Livorno in Italy, where he played for their youth and reserve teams. Yao then signed with St. Mirren of the Scottish Championship but left due to lack of playing time with the first team.

Yao briefly returned to the United States to trial with the New York Red Bulls but failed to secure a contract, returning to the United Kingdom to sign with Ipswich Town. However, he was released from Ipswich Town in 2010 without playing any match with the first team.

In 2011, Yao went to Borinage in the Belgian Second Division. In 2013, he signed with UR La Louvière Centre.

In 2014, after three years in Belgium, Yao headed to Germany, where he joined TSG Neustrelitz in the German fourth tier. After scoring eight goals in 23 matches for Berliner AK 07 in the 2016–2017 season, he signed with SV Meppen in the German 3. Liga.

Yao joined FC Victoria Rosport on 1 January 2019, after signing for the club in December. He left the club already on 10 April 2019.

On September 20, 2019, Yao returned to the United States, joining USL Championship side Fresno FC for the remainder of their 2019 season. He left the club at the end of the year and then returned to Germany, joining Berlin-Liga club FC Brandenburg 03 in the beginning of 2020.
