= Qudus Lawal =

Nigerian footballer

Personal information
- Date of birth: 4 September 1995 (age 31)
- Place of birth: Nigeria
- Height: 1.78 m (5 ft 10 in)
- Position: Forward

Team information
- Current team: Milwaukee Wave
- Number: 3

Youth career
- 2010–2012: Mather Rangers

Senior career*
Years	Team	Apps	(Gls)
2015	Seattle Sounders 2	10	(2)
2015–2016	Wilmington Hammerheads	37	(3)
2017	Chicago FC United	6	(1)
2017–2018	RWB Adria		
2019	Fresno FC	30	(10)
2019–2020	St. Louis Ambush (indoor)	5	(1)
2020	San Diego Loyal	2	(0)
2020–2021	Bylis	7	(0)
2021–2022	Haras El Hodoud		
2022	Panathinaikos Chicago		
2022–2026	Milwaukee Wave (indoor)	11	(8)
2023–2024	Central Valley Fuego	12	(3)
2026-	Empire Strykers		
- * Club domestic league appearances and goals as of November 27, 2024

Qudus Lawal (born 4 September 1995) is a Nigerian footballer who plays as a forward for the Empire Strykers in the Major Arena Soccer League.

== Career ==
Came to America from Nigeria in 2011 and in his first year in Chicago he led Mather high school to the class 2A championship which was the first state championship for a Chicago public school soccer team in 37 years. That was his first year of high school in America and also his senior year.

=== Professional ===
On 18 March 2015, Lawal signed a professional contract with Seattle Sounders FC 2 after a successful preseason trial with the club. He made his professional debut on 29 March in a 4–0 victory over Whitecaps FC 2. On 16 April, he made his first start for S2 and netted a brace against Tulsa Roughnecks FC. Unfortunately, the match ended in a 4–3 defeat.

On 15 June 2015, Lawal was traded to Wilmington Hammerheads in exchange for Ashani Fairclough.

In November 2018, Lawal went on trial with Fresno FC and later signed with the club on 23 January 2019.

Following the dissolution of Fresno FC, Lawal signed with the St. Louis Ambush of the Major Arena Soccer League.
