= Sal Zizzo =

American soccer player (born 1987)

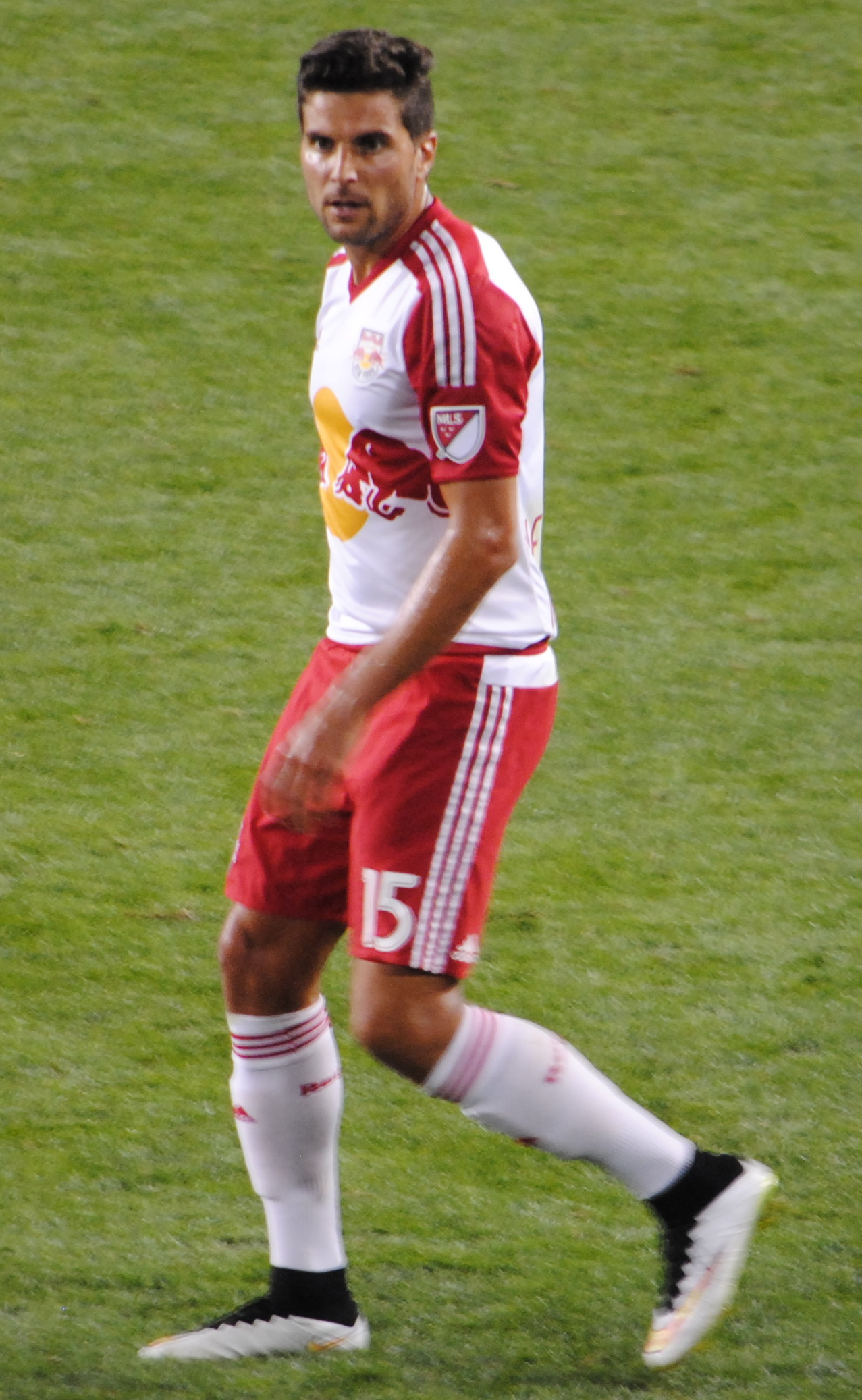
- Zizzo in 2015 with the New York Red Bulls

Personal information
- Full name: Salvatore Zizzo Jr.
- Date of birth: April 3, 1987 (age 39)
- Place of birth: San Diego, California, United States
- Height: 5 ft 11 in (1.80 m)
- Positions: Winger; full-back

Youth career
- 2002–2005: Hotspurs USA

College career
Years	Team	Apps	(Gls)
2005–2006	UCLA Bruins	43	(8)

Senior career*
Years	Team	Apps	(Gls)
2006–2007	Orange County Blue Star	13	(5)
2007–2010	Hannover 96 II	45	(8)
2007–2010	Hannover 96	8	(0)
2009	→ Fortuna Düsseldorf (loan)	0	(0)
2010	Chivas USA	10	(0)
2011–2013	Portland Timbers	60	(2)
2014	Sporting Kansas City	19	(0)
2015–2017	New York Red Bulls	73	(0)
2018	Atlanta United	6	(0)
2018	Atlanta United 2	1	(0)
2020–2021	San Diego Loyal	19	(0)

International career
2007	United States U20	5	(0)
2008	United States U23	2	(0)
2007	United States	1	(0)
- * Club domestic league appearances and goals

Salvatore "Sal" Zizzo Jr. (born April 3, 1987 in San Diego, California) is an American former professional soccer player who played as a winger or full-back.

== Career ==
=== Youth and amateur ===
Zizzo attended Patrick Henry High School, where he played soccer and baseball. As a baseball center fielder, he was a four-year letterman and voted first-team All-CIF his junior year. He also excelled in soccer, he was voted All-CIF honors four years straight (2002–05). He played club soccer for Hotspurs USA (El Cajon, CA), and was a member of his region's Olympic Development Program (ODP) team. Zizzo then went on to play two years of college soccer at UCLA. At UCLA he was an NCSAA/adidas All-American as a freshman in 2005. Zizzo was also selected as Pac10 Freshman Player of the Year the same year. In 2006, UCLA reached the College Cup vs. Santa Barbara in St. Louis.

He finished his career at UCLA with 43 appearances, eight goals, and 14 assists.

During his college years he also played two seasons with senior amateur team Orange County Blue Star in the USL Premier Development League.

=== Professional ===
left college early and turned professional in July 2007 after a successful U20 World Cup in Canada for the United States. signed to Bundesliga club Hannover 96, for a three-year contract. Zizzo made his Bundesliga debut for Hannover on May 10, 2008, in a match against Werder Bremen. In October 2009, Zizzo suffered an ACL injury and missed the entire 2009–10 season.[7] During his stay at the club he was a regular starter for the reserve side, Hannover 96 II, appearing in 45 league matches and scoring 8 goals.

On July 21, 2010, Chivas USA acquired Zizzo through a weighted lottery conducted by MLS. Zizzo played in ten games (making one start) over the second half of the season, totaling 254 minutes and one assist. On February 15, 2011, Zizzo was traded by Chivas USA to MLS expansion side Portland Timbers in exchange for allocation money. Zizzo scored his first MLS goal on August 15, 2012, in a 2–2 draw at Toronto FC. On August 31, 2013, Zizzo scored his second career league goal in a 4–2 loss to Real Salt Lake. In three seasons with Portland Zizzo appeared in 60 league matches and scored two goals and assisted on seven.

On December 13, 2013, Zizzo was traded to Sporting Kansas City in exchange for allocation money. On September 23, 2014, Zizzo helped Sporting to a 3–0 victory over Real Estelí in a CONCACAF Champions League match, scoring the third goal of the match.

On December 10, 2014, Zizzo was the ninth pick of New York City FC in the 2014 MLS Expansion Draft. The following day he was traded to local rivals New York Red Bulls in a deal agreed prior to the draft, with Red Bulls goalkeeper Ryan Meara going the other way on a one-year loan. Zizzo made his debut for New York on March 8, 2015, coming on as a second-half substitute in a 1–1 draw at former club Sporting Kansas City. On March 22, 2015, Zizzo started his first match for New York in a 2–0 victory over rival D.C. United at Red Bull Arena. On July 1, 2015, Zizzo scored his first goal for New York, helping the Red Bulls to a 4–1 victory in the U.S. Open Cup over local rival New York Cosmos. Zizzo ended the season as the club's starting right back and helped New York in capturing the 2015 MLS Supporters' Shield.

On August 15, 2017, Zizzo helped New York to a 3–2 come from behind victory over FC Cincinnati, providing the game winning assist on Bradley Wright-Phillips's goal in the 101st minute which sent New York to their first Open Cup final since 2003.

In January 2018, Zizzo signed as a free agent with Atlanta United FC.

Zizzo announced his retirement from playing professional soccer on May 21, 2019.

Just over six months following his announced retirement, Zizzo returned to professional soccer when he was announced as the first ever signing for USL Championship side San Diego Loyal ahead of their inaugural season in 2020. Following the 2021 season, Zizzo again announced his retirement.

=== International ===
Zizzo represented the U.S. at the U18 and U20 levels. He participated in the Lisbon International Tournament and the Milk Cup in Northern Ireland with the U18s in 2005. Zizzo suited up for the United States. U20 National Team in the 2007 FIFA U20 World Cup, starting all five of the team's matches in the tournament and helping the team reach the quarterfinals. He made his senior national team debut on August 22, 2007, in a friendly against Sweden.

== Personal life ==
Zizzo holds both American and Italian citizenship, as both his parents were born in Palermo, Sicily. This helped with negotiating a contract in Europe with Hannover 96. In November 2013 Zizzo married Destiny Moniz. They have three daughters and one son, Capri Kalei born April 27, 2015, Aeri Elalia born on January 6, 2017, Zuri Meadow born June 29, 2018, and Massi Kailo born June 19, 2021.

== Career statistics ==
As of October 7, 2017

Appearances and goals by club, season and competition
Club	Season	League			Cup		League Cup		Continental		Total	
Club	Season	Division	Apps	Goals	Apps	Goals	Apps	Goals	Apps	Goals	Apps	Goals
Orange County Blue Star	2006	Premier Development League	11	4	0	0	0	0	0	0	11	4
Orange County Blue Star	2007	Premier Development League	2	1	0	0	0	0	0	0	2	1
Orange County Blue Star	Total		13	5	0	0	0	0	0	0	13	5
Hannover 96 II	2007–08	Regionalliga Nord	21	4	0	0	0	0	0	0	21	4
Hannover 96 II	2008–09	Regionalliga Nord	17	1	0	0	0	0	0	0	17	1
Hannover 96 II	2009–10	Regionalliga Nord	7	3	0	0	0	0	0	0	7	3
Hannover 96 II	Total		45	8	0	0	0	0	0	0	45	8
Hannover 96	2007–08	Bundesliga	2	0	0	0	0	0	0	0	2	0
Hannover 96	2008–09	Bundesliga	5	0	1	0	0	0	0	0	6	0
Hannover 96	2009–10	Bundesliga	1	0	0	0	0	0	0	0	1	0
Hannover 96	Total		8	0	1	0	0	0	0	0	9	0
Chivas USA	2010	Major League Soccer	10	0	1	0	0	0	0	0	11	0
Portland Timbers	2011	Major League Soccer	30	0	1	0	0	0	0	0	31	0
Portland Timbers	2012	Major League Soccer	20	1	0	0	0	0	0	0	20	1
Portland Timbers	2013	Major League Soccer	10	1	2	0	0	0	0	0	12	1
Portland Timbers	Total		60	2	3	0	0	0	0	0	63	2
Sporting Kansas City	2014	Major League Soccer	19	0	2	0	0	0	3	1	24	1
New York Red Bulls	2015	Major League Soccer	22	0	2	1	4	0	0	0	28	1
New York Red Bulls	2016	Major League Soccer	28	0	2	0	2	0	3	0	35	0
New York Red Bulls	2017	Major League Soccer	23	0	5	0	0	0	2	0	30	0
New York Red Bulls	Total		73	0	9	1	6	0	5	0	93	1
Atlanta United FC	2018	Major League Soccer	6	0	2	0	0	0	0	0	8	0
Atlanta United 2	2018	USL Championship	1	0	0	0	0	0	0	0	1	0
San Diego Loyal SC	2020	USL Championship	8	0	-		0	0	0	0	8	0
Career total			228	15	16	1	6	0	8	1	258	17

== Honors ==
New York Red Bulls

- MLS Supporters' Shield: 2015

Atlanta United FC

- MLS Cup: 2018
