= Suleiman Samura =

Sierra Leonean footballer

Personal information
- Date of birth: 26 June 1997 (age 29)
- Place of birth: Freetown, Sierra Leone
- Height: 1.65 m (5 ft 5 in)
- Position: Midfielder

Team information
- Current team: San Diego 1904

Youth career
- –2010: Sierra Rangers
- 2010–2016: Craig Bellamy Foundation Academy
- 2015: → Phnom Penh Crown (loan)

Senior career*
Years	Team	Apps	(Gls)
2018	Fresno FC U-23	3	(1)
2019	Laredo Heat	7	(0)
2019	Fresno FC	8	(0)
2020	San Diego Loyal	1	(0)
2021–	San Diego 1904	0	(0)

International career
- Sierra Leone U20
- * Club domestic league appearances and goals as of 5 April 2021

Suleiman Samura (born 26 June 1997) is a Sierra Leonean footballer who last played as a midfielder for San Diego 1904.

== Career ==
=== Craig Bellamy Foundation Academy ===
Samura was an early entrant in the Craig Bellamy Foundation Academy in Tombo. As part of the foundation, Samura spent time with clubs across the UK, including Liverpool, Manchester City and Cardiff City.

==== Loan to Phnom Penh Crown ====
In March 2015, Samura moved to Cambodian side Phnom Penh Crown for an eight-month spell.

=== United States ===
Samura spent time with Fresno FC U-23 in the USL PDL in 2018, and with National Premier Soccer League side Laredo Heat in 2019, before transferring to professional side Fresno FC on 25 July 2019.
