= Hiroki Kurimoto =

Japanese footballer

Hiroki Kurimoto 栗本 広輝
Personal information
- Date of birth: 16 June 1990 (age 36)
- Place of birth: Nagoya, Aichi, Japan
- Height: 1.80 m (5 ft 11 in)
- Position: Midfielder

Team information
- Current team: Blaublitz Akita
- Number: 20

Youth career
- Aichi FC
- Shimizu S-Pulse
- Shizuoka Municipal Shimizu Sakuragaoka High School

College career
Years	Team	Apps	(Gls)
–2013	Juntendo University		

Senior career*
Years	Team	Apps	(Gls)
2013–2018	Honda FC	172	(34)
2019	Fresno FC	28	(1)
2020	Colorado Springs Switchbacks	16	(0)
2021	OKC Energy	2	(0)
2022–2023	Omiya Ardija	43	(1)
2024–	→ Blaublitz Akita	4	(0)
- * Club domestic league appearances and goals as of 3 January 2023

Hiroki Kurimoto (栗本 広輝, Kurimoto Hiroki; born 16 June 1990) is a Japanese professional footballer who plays for Blaublitz Akita.

== Career ==
After attending Juntendo University, he joined Honda FC in 2013.

In the second leg of the 2014 JFL Championship against Sagawa Printing Kyoto, he scored the decisive goal, contributing to the team's league victory.

In 2016, he played in all 30 matches, contributing to Honda's first championship in two years and was awarded MVP.

In 2017, he won the JFL MVP for the second consecutive year, making him the first player in JFL history to achieve this. In December, he was selected for the JFL All-Star overseas expedition team and played as the team's captain.

On January 15, 2019, he announced his departure from Honda FC for personal reasons. In March, he transferred to Fresno FC in the USL Championship. Although his arrival to the team was delayed due to visa procedures, he secured a starting position midway through the season and played in 29 matches, contributing to the team's third-place finish in the league and advancement to the playoffs. However, the team was eliminated in the first round of the playoffs. On October 29, Fresno FC announced the suspension of club activities while hinting at a potential future relocation.

On December 20, 2019, he signed with Colorado Springs Switchbacks FC. On February 28, 2020, it was announced that he would be the team's captain for the 2020 season. He was the only player on the team to play all 16 matches in full, recording 2 assists.

On January 26, 2021, he transferred to OKC Energy FC. In the derby match against FC Tulsa on July 17, he scored 1 goal and provided 1 assist, including the decisive goal. He was selected for the Team of the Week and his winning goal received the Goal of the Month award. Although the team did not advance to the playoffs, he played in every match as a key player and finished the season. However, on December 3, 2021, OKC Energy FC announced the suspension of its 2022 activities due to the replacement of artificial turf at its home stadium.

On February 11, 2022, it was announced that he would join Omiya Ardija. In his J.League debut on March 26, 2022, during the 6th match of J2 against Fagiano Okayama, goalkeeper Yuta Minami was injured in the first half and substituted at halftime. When substitute goalkeeper Tomoki Ueda was injured in the 67th minute, he donned Ueda’s uniform and played as the goalkeeper from the 67th minute. He scored his first J.League goal on October 23 in the 42nd match against V-Varen Nagasaki.

On November 15, 2023, it was announced that he would leave the team at the end of his contract.

On December 26, 2023, it was announced that he would transfer to Blaublitz Akita on a full transfer.

On January 17, 2024, he took and passed the Level 3 of the Japan Chamber of Commerce and Industry Bookkeeping Certification Exam.
