= Juan Pablo Caffa =

Argentine professional footballer

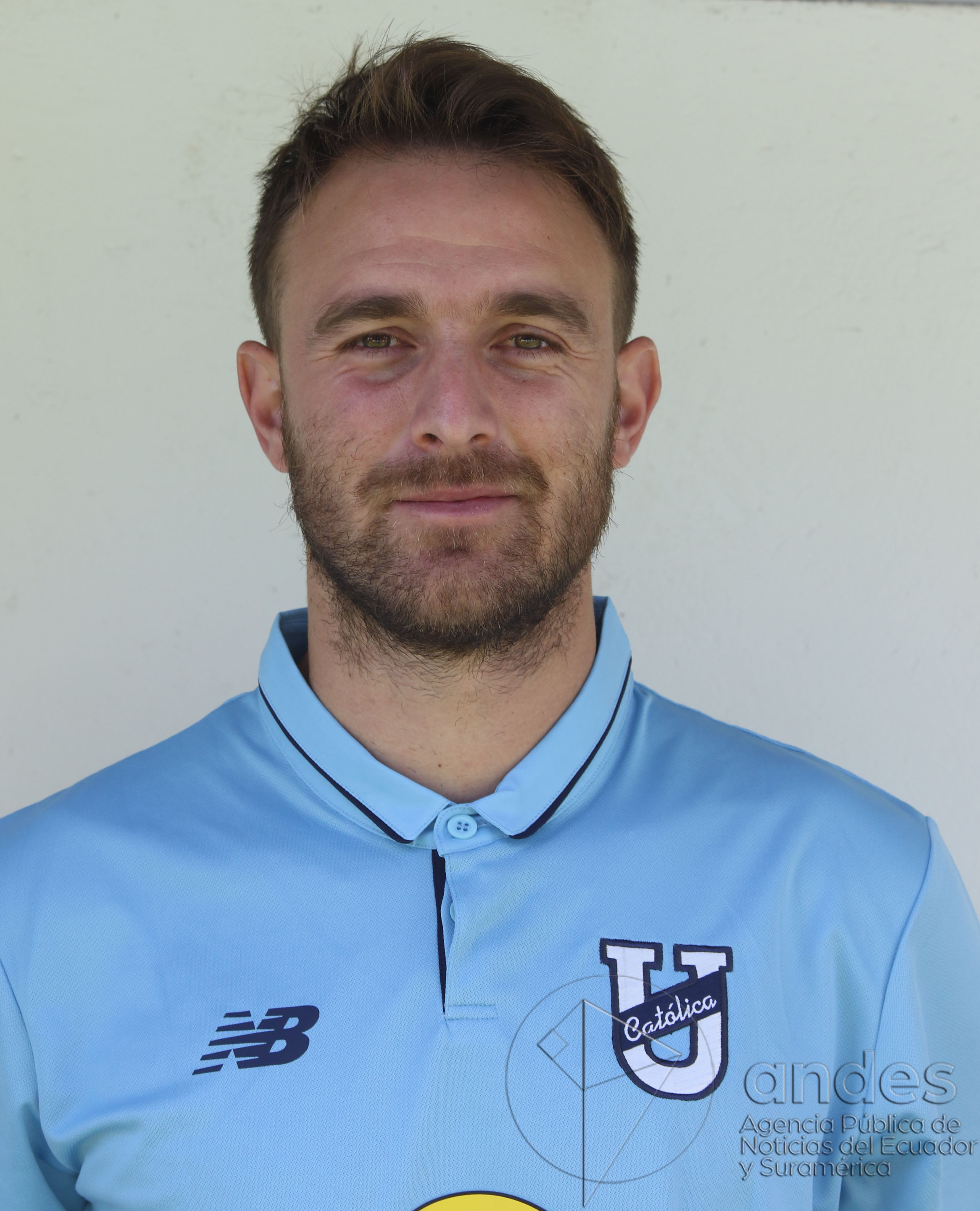

Personal information
- Full name: Juan Pablo Caffa
- Date of birth: 30 September 1984 (age 42)
- Place of birth: Murphy, Argentina
- Height: 1.84 m (6 ft 0 in)
- Position: Winger

Youth career
- Boca Juniors

Senior career*
Years	Team	Apps	(Gls)
2003	Boca Juniors	1	(0)
2004–2005	Ferro Carril Oeste	42	(5)
2005–2007	Arsenal Sarandí	46	(11)
2007–2010	Betis	65	(8)
2008–2009	→ Zaragoza (loan)	38	(4)
2011–2013	Arsenal Sarandí	59	(6)
2013–2014	Asteras Tripolis	26	(2)
2014–2015	Defensor	8	(0)
2015	Liga Loja	38	(9)
2016	Universidad Católica	18	(2)
2017	Tulsa Roughnecks	29	(9)
2018–2019	Fresno	62	(13)
Total		432	(69)
- * Club domestic league appearances and goals

Juan Pablo Caffa (born 30 September 1984) is an Argentine former footballer who played as a left winger.

His nickname was "El violinista del Viaducto" (literally translated as "The violinist of the viaduct"), as he played an imaginary violin during his goal celebrations. His professional career, other than in his own country where he represented Boca Juniors, Ferro Carril Oeste and Arsenal de Sarandí (two spells), was spent in Spain, Greece, Uruguay, Ecuador and the United States.

== Club career ==
=== Argentina ===
Born in Murphy, Santa Fe, Caffa was part of Club Atlético Boca Juniors youth system, being already with the first team when it won the 2003 Apertura, although he only featured in one league match.

In the following years, he played with Ferro Carril Oeste and Arsenal de Sarandí.

=== Spain ===
After a number of strong displays with Arsenal during the 2006 Apertura tournament, Caffa earned a €2 million transfer to Real Betis in the January 2007 transfer window. He played his first La Liga match on 4 February against Athletic Bilbao, but went scoreless in his six season appearances, also not finding the net in his first full campaign although he did not start regularly for the Andalusians.

In 2008–09, Caffa played on loan with Real Zaragoza, being an important attacking element as they returned to the first division after just one year out. Again at Betis, he appeared in 32 games – although only ten starts– and scored seven goals, but the club failed to regain top-flight status.

=== Return to Argentina ===
In early December 2010, Caffa bought out the remainder of his contract with Betis and returned to Argentina to his former team Arsenal, agreeing on a three-year contract.

== Club statistics ==
As of 12 September 2010 (asterisk signals statistics drawn from all competitions)

Season	Club	Division	Apps	Goals	Assists
2002/03	Boca Juniors	(Argentina) Primera División	1	0	?
2005/06	Arsenal	(Argentina) Primera División	25	7	?
2006/07	Arsenal	(Argentina) Primera División	18	4	?
2006/07	Betis	(Spain) La Liga	9*	0	1
2007/08	Betis	(Spain) La Liga	24*	0	7
2008/09	Zaragoza	(Spain) Segunda División	38*	4	6
2009/10	Betis	(Spain) Segunda División	33*	7	7
2010/11	Betis	(Spain) Segunda División	8*	1	2
Total			156	23	23

== Honours ==
Arsenal Sarandí

- Argentine Primera División: 2012 Clausura
