= Adam Smith (soccer coach) =

English-born U.S. soccer coach

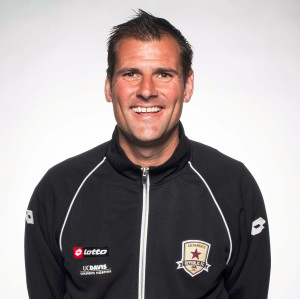

Personal information
- Date of birth: 27 October 1971 (age 55)
- Place of birth: England, UK
- Position: Goalkeeper

Youth career
- 1988: Everton
- 1989: Chatteris Town
- 1989: Cambridge United
- 1990: Winsford United
- 1991: Crewe Alexandra

Senior career*
| Years | Team | Apps | (Gls) |
| 1992 | Walsall | | |
| 1992 | → Holywell Town (loan) | | |
| 1992 | → Mold Alexandra (loan) | | |
| 1994 | Los Angeles Salsa | | |
| 1997 | Soham Town Rangers | | |
| 1998 | Harrogate Town | | |
| 1999 | Geylang United | | |
| 1999 | Motherwell | | |
| 1999–2002 | Long Island Rough Riders | | |
| 2002–2004 | Wilmington Hammerheads | | |

Managerial career
- 2010–2012: Portland Timbers (GK Coach/Reserve Head Assistant)
- 2014–2017: Sacramento Republic (Head Assistant)
- 2017–2019: Fresno FC (Head Coach/Manager)
- 2021: Detroit City (First Team interim Coach)
- 2022: Ventura County Fusion (Director of Football)
- 2023: Central Valley Fuego (U20's Head Coach & Club Sporting Director)
- * Club domestic league appearances and goals

Adam Smith is currently serving as the Sporting Director for USL League 1 team, Central Valley Fuego FC. Smith has held coaching positions at Portland Timbers in Major League Soccer, Fresno FC (USL Championship) and Sacramento Republic (USL Championship). Prior to joining Fuego, Smith took the role of CEO and Director of Football at USL League 2 team Ventura County Fusion. Fusion had previously been on a two-year hiatus from the league due to Covid shutdowns, but returned to win the National Championship in 2022 . During the 2021 season, Smith took an interim position as First Team Coach at Detroit City FC. This was to provide short-term help to the Head Coach and General manager, Trevor James. Detroit went onto win the NISA Legends tournament that same season.

Smith was the inaugural Head Coach of USL Championship side Fresno FC taking them to 3rd place in the USL Championship Western Conference in only its 2nd season in the league. This was Smith's first Head Managerial position of a Senior Team (aside from two interim games with Sacramento Republic). Unfortunately, after the successful first two years, the Fresno FC ownership group decided to cease operations at the end of the 2019 season. This was for non-soccer related matters and was in part due to not being able to secure a soccer specific stadium.

Before joining Fresno, Smith was formerly the Assistant Head Coach at Sacramento Republic, helping the club achieve a USL Championship 1st place Western Conference finish in 2016 with then Head Coach, Paul Buckle. Smith spent three years at the Club, initially under the team's first Head Coach, Predrag Radosavljević (Preki). Prior to working under Preki, Smith served under John Spencer at Portland Timbers where he became the inaugural Goalkeeping Coach for the teams' first year in Major League Soccer. Smith later went on to be the club's first Academy Director, and was responsible for helping to build the Clubs first Academy Teams and the Timbers Alliance program. After serving five years with the MLS Club, he moved to return to first team professional football with Sacramento at the start of the 2015 season.

== Career ==
Playing career Smith, who played as goalkeeper, began his professional playing career in 1992 after graduating from Manchester Metropolitan University in England, with a degree in business and sports coaching. Smith was a school boy player at Everton FC of the EPL and signed his first contract with Walsall FC of the EFL. Smith also represented England Independent Schoolboys at both the U16 and U19 levels. Additionally, he represented a British Colleges X1 in 1992. Smith did not make a professional league full appearance in England but was able to ply his trade in non-league football (making over 250 first team semi-professional appearances). Smith gained professional playing experience in England, Scotland, Wales and southeast Asia. He then went on work in the US as a full-time professional, playing in the second division league (A league and USL Pro) initially for Long Island Rough Riders and then Wilmington Hammerheads, winning back-to-back USL National Championships in 2002 and 2003 respectively.

== Personal life ==
Smith, originally from England but now a US citizen, resides in California with his wife and two children. He has over 30 years of domestic and international experience at many different levels and roles within the game of soccer. Prior to working full-time in professional soccer, Smith worked as a financial advisor after completing his college degree. During his part-time professional playing, he worked for a large insurance company and then a national banking institution. He is the son of Graham Smith, an ex-professional English footballer who was previously a director at Chelsea of the English Premier League and then prior owner of the successful player agency First Wave Sports. Graham Smith has had over 200 English league appearances as a professional player and was able to help build Sacramento Republic to a Championship winning team as the club's first ever Director of Football.

== Honors ==
Playing

- USL National Championship winner, Long island Rough Riders, 2002
- USL National Championship winner, Wilmington Hammerheads, 2003

Coaching

- USL PDL National Championship winner, Portland Timbers u23s, 2010
- USL playoffs 2nd place Western conference, Portland Timbers, 2010
- Cascadia Cup winner, Portland Timbers, 2010
- MLS Goalkeeper player of the year (Troy Perkins), Portland Timbers, 2011
- MLS Reserve Team 2nd place position, Portland Timbers, 2011
- USL Western conference playoffs, Sacramento Republic, 2015
- USL 1st place Western conference, Sacramento Republic, 2016
- US Open Cup round of 16, Sacramento Republic, 2017
- USL Western conference semi-finals, Sacramento Republic, 2017
- US Open Cup 4th round v LAFC, Fresno FC, 2018
- USL Western Conference 3rd place, Fresno FC, 2019
- Nomination for USL Championship Coach of the Year, 2019
- Nisa legends tournament winner, Detroit City FC, 2021
- USL League 2 National Champion, Ventura Fusion, 2022

== Coaching qualifications ==
Uefa A license (Welsh Football Association)

English Preliminary Award (English FA)

USSF A license (US Soccer)

USSF National GK license (US Soccer)

USSF Pro B license (US Soccer)

NSCAA National GK License (Utd Soccer coaches)

NSCAA Director of Coaching (Utd Soccer coaches)
