= CJ Cochran =

American professional soccer player

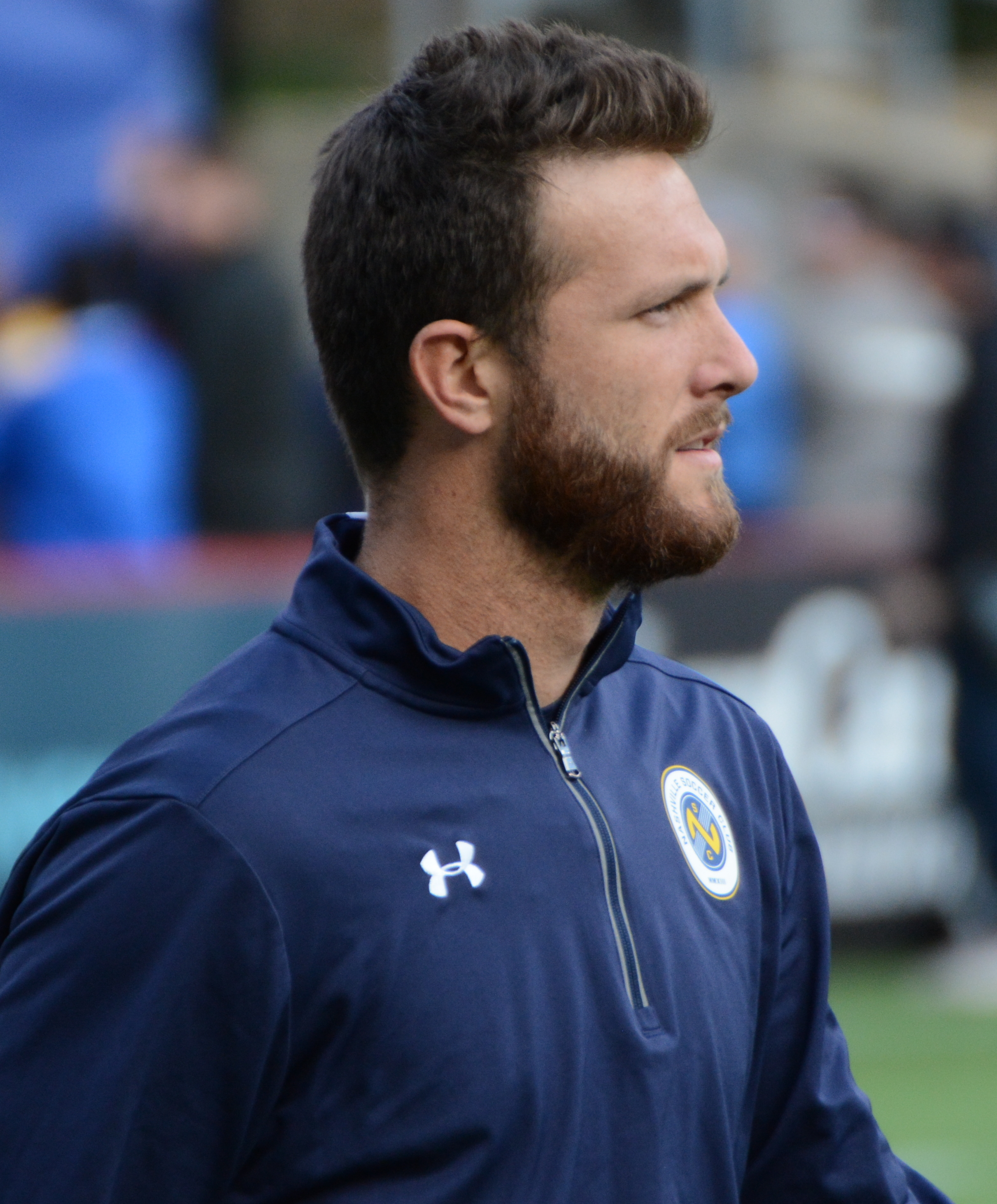
- Cochran with Nashville SC in 2018

Personal information
- Full name: Carl Howard Cochran, Jr.
- Date of birth: September 27, 1991 (age 35)
- Place of birth: Alpharetta, Georgia, United States
- Height: 1.93 m (6 ft 4 in)
- Position: Goalkeeper

College career
Years	Team	Apps	(Gls)
2011–2014	Georgia State Panthers		

Senior career*
Years	Team	Apps	(Gls)
2015	Atlanta Silverbacks	8	(0)
2016–2017	Oklahoma City Energy	11	(0)
2018	Nashville SC	3	(0)
2018	→ Fresno FC (loan)	5	(0)
2019	Fresno FC	34	(0)
2020–2022	Oklahoma City Energy	44	(0)
2020	→ Nashville SC (loan)	0	(0)
2022	→ Tampa Bay Rowdies (loan)	25	(0)
- * Club domestic league appearances and goals as of October 19, 2022

Carl Howard "CJ" Cochran Jr. (born September 27, 1991) is an American professional soccer player who plays as a goalkeeper.

Cochran was born in Alpharetta, Georgia and played his earlier career with Georgia State Panthers before starting his professional career with Atlanta Silverbacks in 2015. After a year with Atlanta, he joined United Soccer League club Oklahoma City Energy.

== Playing career ==
=== Youth career ===
Cochran started his career with a successful four years at Georgia State University, where he achieved such records as posting the season's all-time record goals-against average of 1.33. Cochran also ended his National Collegiate Athletic Association career with the competition's third-most clean sheets of 11 and with the third-best single-season goals-against average of 1.47 in 2014. While at Georgia State, Cochran also won numerous awards during his time there which included the Sun Belt and College Sports Madness Independent Defensive Player of the Week awards and two Colonial Athletic Association Rookie of the Week awards.

In total, Cochran played 4,345 minutes of action with Georgia State which involved 48 starts. With 188 saves during his time there, Cochran comes in the top-10 for most career saves with the Panthers.

=== Professional career ===
In 2015, Atlanta Silverbacks offered Cochran a trial at the club. After starting pre-season as a trialist, Cochran signed a professional contract with the club. On April 4, 2015, Cochran made his debut for the Atlanta Silverbacks against Indy Eleven in a match that ended 1–1. On July 7, Cochran was nominated for the NASL Play of the Week award for his save against Martin Nuñez of the Tampa Bay Rowdies. In 2016, Cochran left Atlanta after the club was suspended by the league after it was not successful in finding new ownership for the club, the franchise was suspended on January 11, 2016. Cochran made a total of 9 appearances for Atlanta. After departing Atlanta, Cochran joined United Soccer League club Oklahoma City Energy.

On December 7, 2017, Nashville SC announced Cochran as a new signing. He was loaned to Fresno FC in June 2018. On November 14, 2018, Nashville announced that they had not re-signed Cochran for the 2019 season. Cochran subsequently rejoined Fresno FC at the end of November on a permanent one-year contract.

On December 20, 2019, it was announced that Cochran would return to Oklahoma City Energy.

On October 12, 2020, Cochran returned to Nashville SC on loan for the remainder of the 2020 Major League Soccer season.

OKC Energy announced that the team would be suspending play for the 2022 USL Championship season. On January 21, 2022, it was announced that Cochran would spend the 2022 season on loan from OKC to the Tampa Bay Rowdies. He left Tampa following their 2022 season.

== Career statistics ==
As of match played August 16, 2019.

Appearances and goals by club, season and competition
Club	Season	League			National Cup (Note: Includes the Lamar Hunt U.S. Open Cup)		Continental		Other (Note: Includes the USL Playoffs)		Total	
Club	Season	Division	Apps	Goals	Apps	Goals	Apps	Goals	Apps	Goals	Apps	Goals
Atlanta Silverbacks	2015	NASL	8	0	1	0	—		0	0	9	0
Oklahoma City Energy	2016	USL	4	0	1	0	—		0	0	5	0
Oklahoma City Energy	2017	USL	7	0	3	0	—		3 (Note: Appearance(s) in USL Cup)	0	13	0
Oklahoma City Energy	Total		11	0	4	0	—		3	0	18	0
Nashville SC	2018	USL	3	0	2	0	—		0	0	5	0
Fresno FC (loan)	2018	USL	5	0	0	0	—		0	0	5	0
Fresno FC	2019	USL	23	0	0	0	—		0	0	23	0
Career total			50	0	7	0	—		3	0	60	0

== Honors ==
Georgia State Panthers

- Athletic Director's Honor Roll (4): 2010 Fall Semester, 2011 Spring Semester, 2011 Fall Semester, 2014 Spring Semester
- TopDrawerSoccer.com Midseason Top 100 Freshmen to Watch: 2011
- CAA Rookie of the Week (2): October 3, 2011, October 10, 2011
- College Sports Madness Independent Defensive Player of the Week: 2013
- Sun Belt Defensive Player of the Week: September 2014
