= Elijah Martin =

American professional soccer player (born 1996)

Personal information
- Full name: Elijah Kain Martin
- Date of birth: July 4, 1996 (age 30)
- Place of birth: Fresno, California, United States
- Height: 1.68 m (5 ft 6 in)
- Positions: Defender; midfielder

Youth career
- 2009–2012: Cal Odyssey
- 2013–2014: LA Galaxy

Senior career*
Years	Team	Apps	(Gls)
2013	IMG Academy Bradenton	10	(1)
2014–2015	LA Galaxy II	17	(0)
2016	Tampa Bay Rowdies 2	5	(0)
2017–2018	Fresno FC U-23	21	(2)
2019	Fresno FC	30	(1)
2020–2023	San Diego Loyal	99	(2)
2024	El Paso Locomotive	0	(0)
2025	AVA Alta	1	(0)
2026–	Valley 559 FC		

International career^{‡}
2013	United States U17		
- * Club domestic league appearances and goals as of October 31, 2025 ‡ National team caps and goals as of March 23, 2016

Elijah Kain Martin (born July 4, 1996) is an American professional soccer player who plays as a defender for United Premier Soccer League club Valley 559 FC.

== Youth ==
From Fresno, California, Martin played for Cal Odyssey of the U.S. Development Academy for three years before joining the USL PDL side of the IMG Academy in 2013. Martin joined the LA Galaxy U-17/18 squad for the 2013–2014 U.S. Soccer Development Academy season.

== Professional career ==
=== LA Galaxy II ===
Before the 2014 USL Pro season, Martin signed for the LA Galaxy II squad, the reserve side of the LA Galaxy of Major League Soccer. Martin then made his debut for the Galaxy II side on June 8, 2014, against the Dayton Dutch Lions. He came on as a halftime substitute for Dragan Stojkov as the Galaxy II won 5–1. He left the club following the 2015 season.

=== Tampa Bay Rowdies 2 ===
Martin was announced on April 14, 2016, as a member of the initial roster for the Tampa Bay Rowdies' NPSL reserve side Rowdies 2.

=== El Paso Locomotive ===
Following San Diego Loyal's disbandment, Martin signed with El Paso Locomotive ahead of their 2024 season. On June 17, 2024, Martin and El Paso Locomotive mutually agreed to part ways.

=== AV Alta FC ===
Martin signed with USL League One expansion club AV Alta on December 27, 2024.

== International ==
Martin has played for the United States U17 side during the 2013 CONCACAF U-17 Championship.

== Career statistics ==
As of February 3, 2016

Club	Season	League			League Cup		U.S. Open Cup		CONCACAF		Total	
Club	Season	Division	Apps	Goals	Apps	Goals	Apps	Goals	Apps	Goals	Apps	Goals
LA Galaxy II	2014	USL Pro	7	0	0	0	—	—	—	—	7	0
LA Galaxy II	2015	USL	8	0	0	0	—	—	—	—	8	0
Fresno FC II	2017	USOC	-	-	—	—	1	0	—	—	1	0
Fresno FC	2019	USLC	30	1	1	0	2	0	—	—	33	1
San Diego Loyal	2020	USLC	15	0	-	-	-	-	—	—	15	0
San Diego Loyal	2021	USLC	31	1	1	0	-	-	—	—	32	1
San Diego Loyal	2022	USLC	33	1	1	0	2	0	—	—	36	1
San Diego Loyal	2023	USLC	20	0	0	0	2	0	—	—	22	0
Career total			144	3	3	0	7	0	0	0	154	3
