= Arun Basuljevic =

American soccer player (born 1995)

Personal information
- Date of birth: December 17, 1995 (age 30)
- Place of birth: Bronx, New York, U.S.
- Height: 5 ft 10 in (1.78 m)
- Position: Midfielder

Youth career
- 2004–2008: Blau Weiss Gottschee
- 2008–2014: New York Red Bulls

College career
Years	Team	Apps	(Gls)
2014–2016	Georgetown Hoyas	60	(14)

Senior career*
Years	Team	Apps	(Gls)
2015–2016	New York Red Bulls U-23	18	(8)
2017	New York Red Bulls	0	(0)
2017	→ New York Red Bulls II (loan)	27	(2)
2018	Fremad Amager	6	(0)
2018	Nyköpings BIS	13	(0)
2019	Fresno FC	20	(4)
2020–2021	Oklahoma City Energy	41	(1)
2022–2023	Monterey Bay	19	(0)
2023–2024	El Paso Locomotive	7	(0)
2026	Brooklyn FC	0	(0)
- * Club domestic league appearances and goals as of March 2, 2026

Arun Basuljevic (born December 17, 1995) is an American retired professional soccer player and founder of Inveniam Sport.

== Career ==
=== College & Youth ===
Basuljevic played three years of college soccer at Georgetown University between 2014 and 2016. Basuljevic appeared for USL PDL side New York Red Bulls U-23. While at Georgetown, Basuljevic was named Soccer America's Freshman of the Year and the Big East Freshman of the Year. Basuljevic was a participant in U-14, U-15 and U-20 USA National Team Camps.

=== New York Red Bulls ===
On January 24, 2017, Basuljevic signed a Homegrown Contract with New York Red Bulls. He made his professional debut with New York Red Bulls II on March 25, 2017, starting in a 3–3 draw with Pittsburgh Riverhounds. He had his first professional assist in the March 25, 2017 game. On August 5, 2017, Basuljevic scored his first goal as a professional, opening the scoring for Red Bulls II in a 2–1 victory over Rochester Rhinos. In October 2017, Basuljevic scored his second goal of the season for New York in a 6–5 victory over Orlando City B.

=== Fremad Amager ===
Basuljevic signed for Danish 1st Division club Fremad Amager on 28 February 2018, after a one-week trial at the club. He made his league debut on 18 March 2018 in a 0–0 home draw against Nykøbing FC. He was subbed on for Martin Jensen in the 84th minute.

=== Nyköpings BIS ===
Basuljevic joined Division 1 Norra side Nyköpings BIS. He was an integral part in the club's historic Svenska Cup victory against first division side, GIF Sundsvall, in August 2018.

=== Fresno FC ===
On February 18, 2019, Basuljevic joined USL Championship side Fresno FC.

On August 3, 2019, during a match against the Las Vegas Lights, Basuljevic suffered a broken leg. Following the folding of the club, Basuljevic and teammates were free to pursue other options.

=== Oklahoma City Energy ===
Basuljevic joined USL Championship side OKC Energy FC.

=== Monterey Bay FC ===
Basuljevic was announced as signing for Monterey Bay FC on February 8, 2022. Basuljevic was included in the starting 11 for Monterey Bay's inaugural match, a 4–2 loss to Phoenix Rising FC. Following the 2022 season, Basuljevic was announced as staying with Monterey Bay for the 2023 season. On March 23, 2023, Monterey Bay and Basuljevic mutually agreed to terminate his contract with the club.

=== El Paso Locomotive ===
On August 31, 2023, it was announced that Basuljevic had signed for USL Championship team El Paso Locomotive FC, staying until the end of the 2023 season. He made his debut for the club on September 2 against his former club Monterey Bay as an 86th-minute substitute.

=== Brooklyn FC ===
On January 16, 2026, Basuljevic was announced as a signing with USL Championship side Brooklyn FC, joining their inaugural roster. On March 3, 2026, Brooklyn officially announced that Basuljevic had retired from professional soccer ahead of the 2026 season.
