= Chukchansi Park =

Baseball stadium in Fresno, California; home of the Fresno Grizzlies

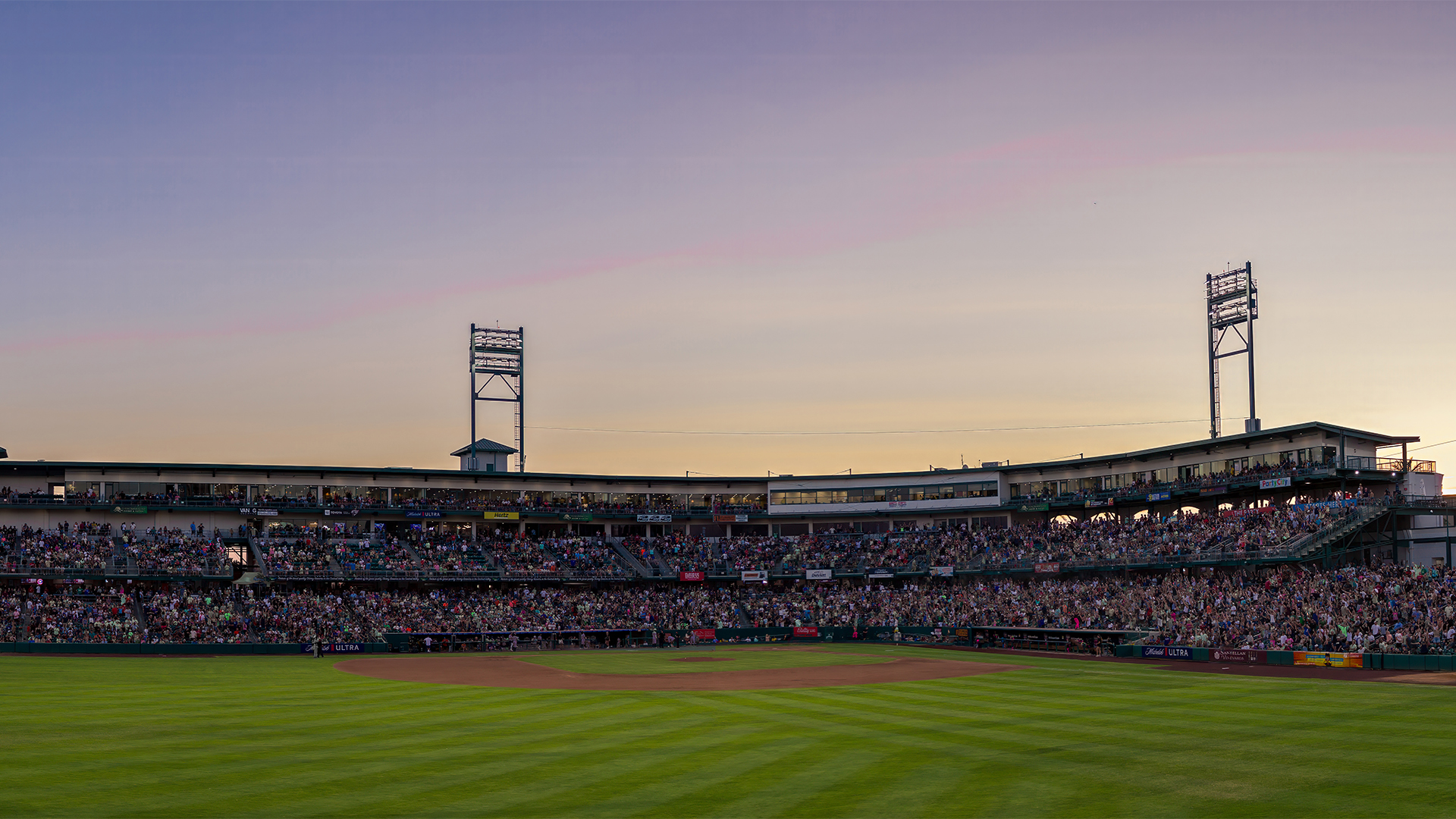

- Location within California Location within the United States
- Interactive map of Chukchansi Park
- Former names: Grizzlies Stadium (2002–2006)
- Address: 1800 Tulare Street; Fresno, California; United States
- Coordinates: 36.7321°N 119.7905°W
- Owner: City of Fresno
- Operator: Fresno Sports Management, LLC.
- Capacity: 10,650
- Executive suites: 33
- Surface: Grass
- Scoreboard: Cost: $2,000,000; 2,000 sq ft (190 m^{2})
- Record attendance: 21,097 (April 22, 2023, Marca MP, Peso Pluma, Edgardo Nuñez y mas)
- Field size: Left field: 324 ft (99 m); Center field: 402 ft (123 m); Right field: 335 ft (102 m)
- Public transit: Fresno Fresno Area Express (FAX)

Construction
- Groundbreaking: August 8, 2000
- Opened: May 1, 2002
- Cost: $46 million ($82.3 million in 2025 dollars)
- Architect: Populous
- Project manager: Huber, Hunt & Nichols
- Structural engineers: Advanced Structural Design, Inc.
- Services engineers: Bredson & Associates, Inc.
- General contractor: Mauldin-Dorfmeier

Tenants
- Fresno Grizzlies (PCL/Low-A West/CL) 2002–present Fresno FC (USLC) 2018–2019; Fresno FC U-23 (USL2) 2006–2018; Fresno FC Ladies (WPSL) 2015–2018

Website
- fresnogrizzlies.com

Chukchansi Park, formerly known as Grizzlies Stadium, is a city-owned baseball stadium located in Fresno, California, United States, completed in 2002 as the home for Minor League Baseball's Fresno Grizzlies. The first game was May 1, 2002. Located in downtown Fresno, it was designed to be an anchor in the rehabilitation of the area, as other commercial development is planned in the Central Business District Loop. The ballpark is also used for music concerts, motocross events, and high school football.

== History ==
Upon the 1998 arrival of the Grizzlies minor league baseball team in Fresno, a group of developers proposed building a stadium in downtown Fresno as a permanent home for the club. There was extensive debate over how much money the City of Fresno would contribute to the project. Ultimately the stadium was built entirely with public money and then leased back to the owners of the Grizzlies for 30 years at $1.5 million per year.

The stadium was designed by Populous, the firm responsible for many of today's sports stadiums like Oriole Park at Camden Yards, Petco Park, Comerica Park and Oracle Park in San Francisco. The $46 million facility seats 10,650, with left field dimensions of 324 ft (99 m); center field, 400 ft (120 m); and right field, 335 ft (102 m). The ballpark features 600 club seats and 32 luxury suites

In September 2006, Chukchansi Gold Resort & Casino, affiliated with the Chukchansi tribe, announced it would be the premier corporate sponsor for Grizzlies Stadium, in a 15-year, US$16 million deal.

In August 2011, the stadium served as a filming location for Parental Guidance. During the game, Billy Crystal threw out the first pitch in character and later appeared on the Grizzlies radio broadcast for an inning.

One of the stadium's most popular events is an annual "taco truck throwdown" where food trucks compete for best taco according to the event's judges. Based on the event, the team designed and wore taco-oriented jerseys.

== Attendance records ==
The stadium's attendance record was set on July 10, 2015, when Chukchansi Park hosted an exhibition soccer game between Mexican soccer clubs Chivas and Atlas, in front of 16,824 fans. The stadium's second attendance record was set on June 27, 2012, when Chukchansi Park hosted an exhibition soccer game between Mexican soccer clubs América and Chiapas of the Primera División, in front of a crowd of 16,125 fans; breaking the previous record set on March 26, 2008, when the Grizzlies played their parent club, the San Francisco Giants, in an exhibition game in front of 14,084 fans.

On March 27, 2015, Liga MX teams Cruz Azul and León faced off in an international friendly match in front of a crowd of 15,087 spectators, the third largest crowd recorded at Chukchansi Park.

On May 11, 2012, the Grizzlies fell to the Iowa Cubs in front of 14,023 fans, which is the largest regular season crowd in franchise history.

== Boxing events ==
- November 9, 2019 - Top Rank promoted card, which aired on ESPN+, saw Jamel Herring retain his WBO super featherweight world championship via unanimous decision against Lamont Roach. Also on the card was future world champion Janibek Alimkhanuly and heavyweight contender Kubrat Pulev.
- October 16, 2021 - Matchroom Boxing promoted card, which aired on DAZN. This event saw a huge upset, when massive underdog Sandor Martin defeated former multiple-weight world champion Mikey Garcia via unanimous decision. This would turn out to be Garcia's final professional fight and was attended by 8,000 fans.

== Gallery ==
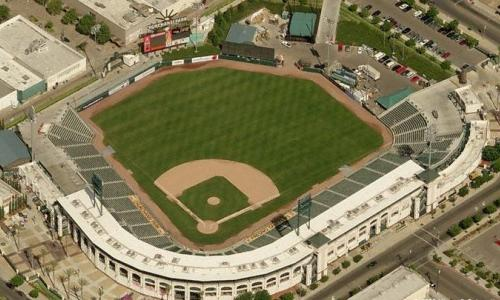
Chukchansi Park aerial view

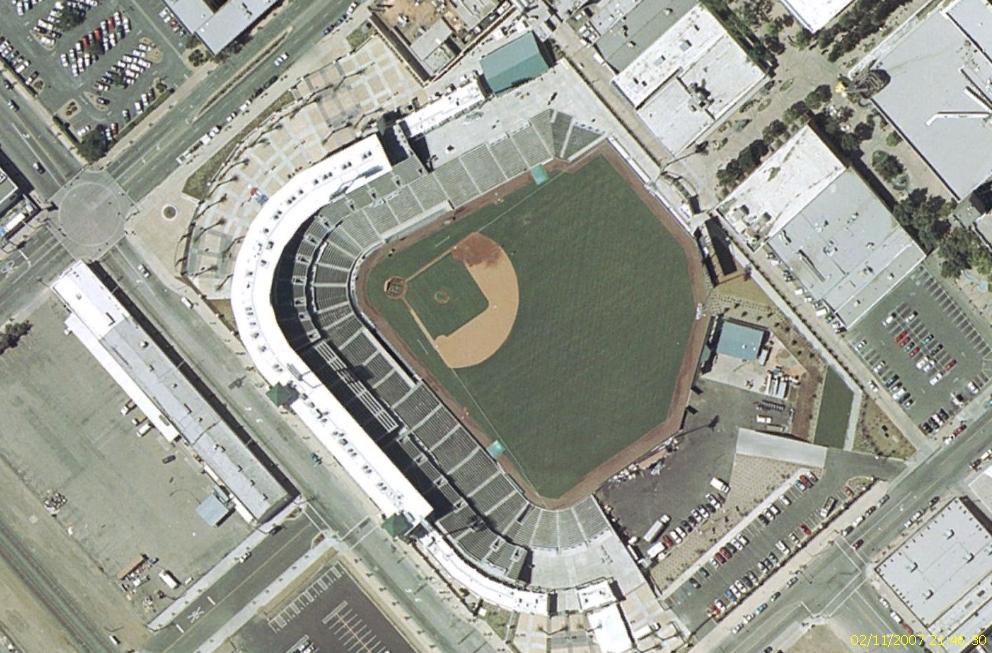
Chukchansi Park aerial view

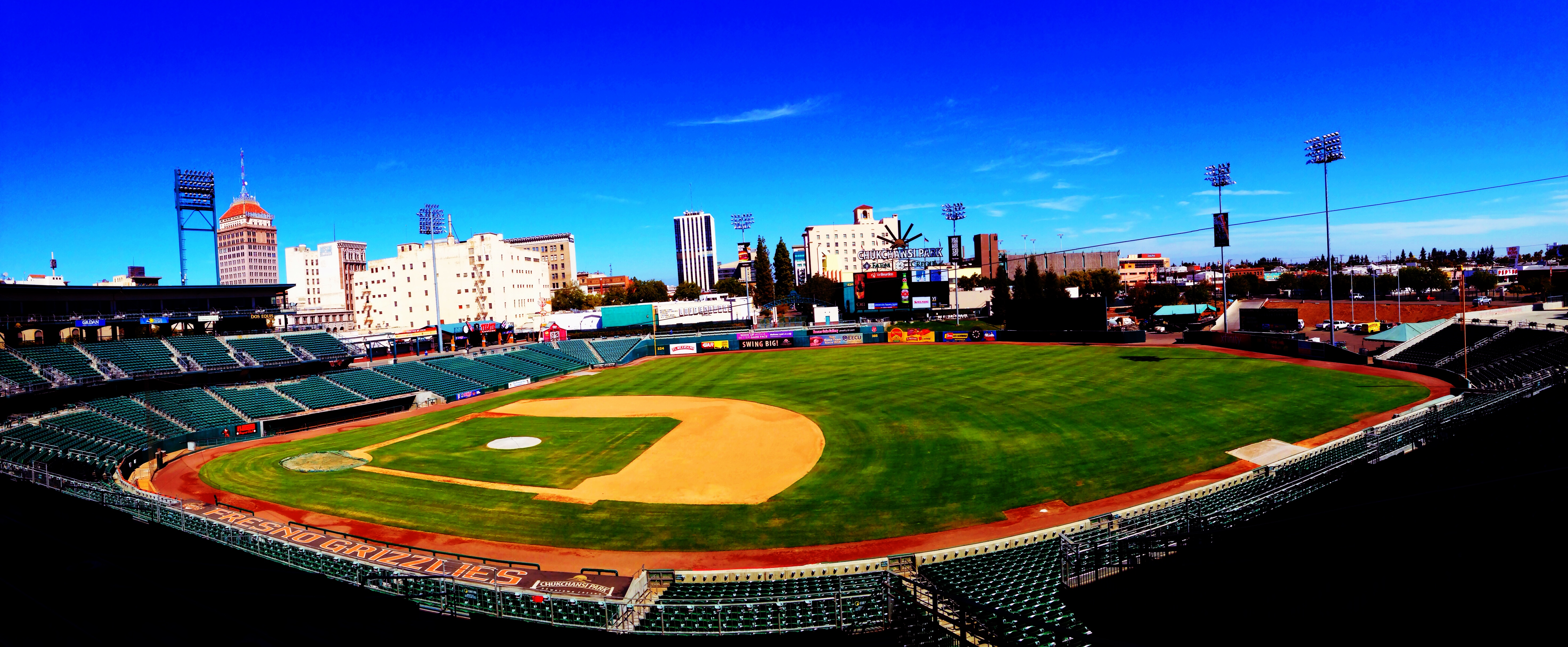
Morning view at Chukchansi Park looking east

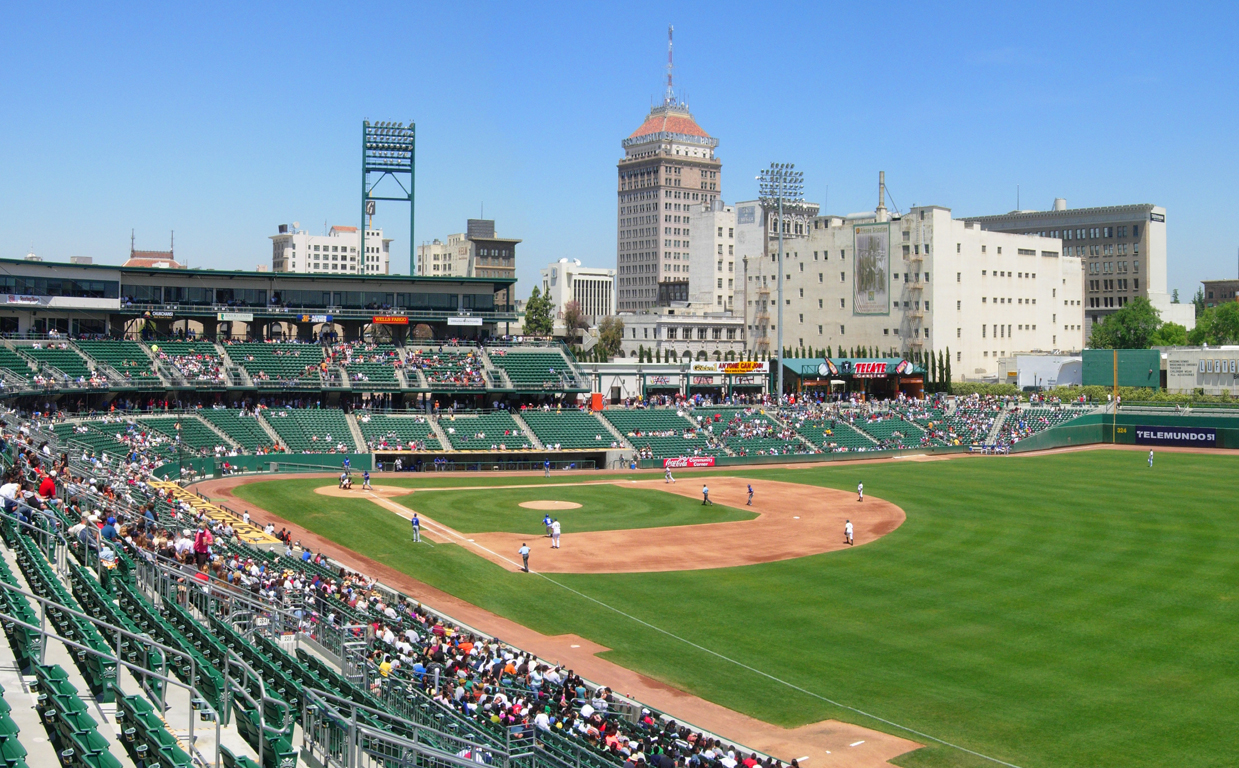
Downtown Fresno skyline from Chukchansi Park

== See also ==
- Save Mart Center
- Selland Arena

Events and tenants
Preceded by Pete Beiden Field	Home of the Fresno Grizzlies; 2002–present	Succeeded by current
