= Jaime Chavez =

American soccer player

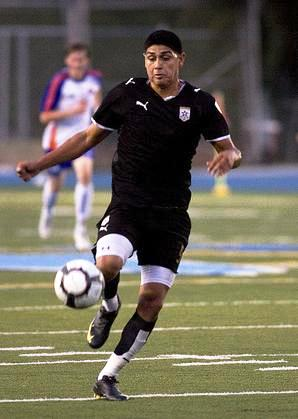
- Chavez playing for Hollywood United in 2010

Personal information
- Full name: Jaime Day Chavez
- Date of birth: July 17, 1987 (age 39)
- Place of birth: Industry, California, United States
- Height: 6 ft 1 in (1.85 m)
- Position: Forward

Youth career
- 2004–2005: Chivas USA

Senior career*
Years	Team	Apps	(Gls)
2009–2010	Hollywood United Hitmen	31	(21)
2011	Los Angeles Blues	0	(0)
2012	Los Angeles Misioneros	11	(9)
2013–2014	Cal FC		
2014–2015	Atlanta Silverbacks	56	(16)
2016–2018	Miami FC	52	(15)
2018	Miami FC 2	11	(9)
2018	Tampa Bay Rowdies	5	(1)
2019	Fresno FC	29	(12)
2020–2021	OKC Energy	42	(5)
2022	Los Angeles Force	2	(0)
Total		239+	(88+)
- * Club domestic league appearances and goals

Jaime Chavez (born July 17, 1987) is an American former professional soccer player.

== Career ==
=== Youth and amateur ===
Chavez attended William Workman High School, and had a successful youth club career playing on winning teams in the Disney Cup, State Cup and Verizon Cup, among others. He played on Chivas USA's U-17 youth team in 2004 and 2005, and went on to play for various amateur teams in the Los Angeles area before signing for the Hollywood United Hitmen in the USL Premier Development League in 2009.

He was Hollywood's leading goal scorer in both his seasons with the team, leading them to the PDL playoffs in consecutive years, scoring 10 goals in 15 games in 2009, and hitting 11 more in 2010. He was named to the PDL All-Western Conference team following the 2010 season.

=== Professional ===
Chavez signed with the expansion Los Angeles Blues of the new USL Professional League on January 19, 2011.

Chavez returned to the PDL in 2012 when he signed to play with the Los Angeles Misioneros; he made his debut for his new team on April 29, assisting on Victor Sanchez's goal in a 3–1 loss to Fresno Fuego.

Chavez signed with Oklahoma City Energy FC of USL Championship on December 19, 2019.
