= San Diego Loyal SC =

Former American soccer team in San Diego, California

- Full name: San Diego Loyal Soccer Club
- Founded: June 20, 2019; 6 years ago
- Dissolved: October 22, 2023; 2 years ago
- Stadium: Torero Stadium
- Capacity: 6,000
- Owner(s): Andrew Vassiliadis; Warren Smith; Landon Donovan; DeAndre Yedlin
- Executive VP: Landon Donovan
- League: USL Championship (2020–2023)
- 2023: 3rd, Western Conference; Playoffs: Conference Quarterfinals
Home colors	Away colors	Third colors

San Diego Loyal Soccer Club was an American professional soccer team based in San Diego, California, that competed in the USL Championship. The team was founded by Warren Smith and Landon Donovan; it made its debut in 2020 as an expansion team. The team played its home games at Torero Stadium. The Loyal shut down following the 2023 season after failing to find a long-term home venue.

== History ==
On June 20, 2019, San Diego was awarded an expansion team in the USL Championship to debut in 2020 or 2021. Warren Smith, one of the co-founders of Sacramento Republic, was named the president of the new club. Former USMNT, LA Galaxy and San Jose Earthquakes player Landon Donovan was named the executive vice president of soccer operations. He was named as the club's first manager on November 14. The team's name and crest were developed through fan engagement to reflect the interests of the city. On March 7, 2020, the team played their first competitive match, a 1–1 draw against Las Vegas Lights at their home stadium, Torero Stadium.

The Loyal forfeited a league match against LA Galaxy II on September 25, 2020, following an alleged use of a racial slur by Omar Ontiveros against Elijah Martin, one of the Loyal's black players. The match had been played to a 1–1 draw and Ontiveros was later suspended for seven matches by the USL Championship. A week later, the team forfeited another match against Phoenix Rising by walking out after halftime following the alleged use of a homophobic slur against Collin Martin, an openly gay player, by Junior Flemmings. As a result of the two forfeits, the Loyal failed to qualify for the USL playoffs.

The team reached the playoffs in the 2021 and 2022 seasons, but never advanced beyond the first round. Donovan was later replaced as head coach by former assistant Nate Miller in December 2022.

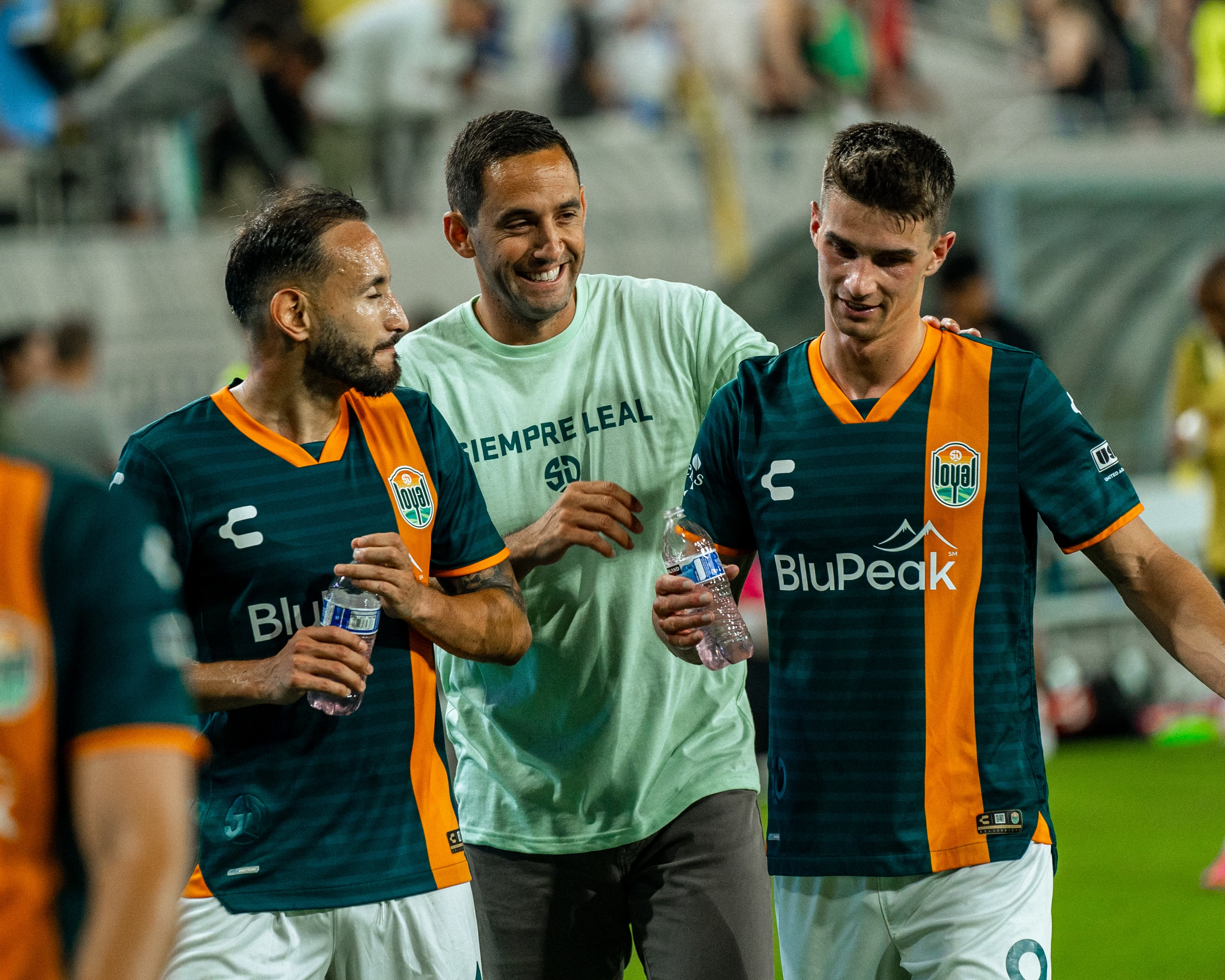
San Diego Loyal players in 2023

On August 24, 2023, owner Andrew Vassilanis released a statement that he would shut down the team, and the USL announced that it would transfer the franchise rights of the Loyal due to an inability to find a "viable near- and long-term stadium solution", with the 2023 season set to be the club's last. The team had searched for a venue to replace Torero Stadium but were unable to find suitable facilities in San Diego County; a plan to relocate to Santa Barbara was also considered. The announcement came three months after Major League Soccer announced a San Diego expansion team that would begin play in 2025 as San Diego FC. The club qualified for the USLC Playoffs and played their final match in the Western Conference Quarterfinals on October 22 at Torero Stadium. Loyal lost 4–3 in extra time to Phoenix Rising, who eventually became the champions of the USLC Playoffs.

== Stadium ==
The team signed a three-year letter of commitment to play at Torero Stadium, with a series of one-year options for the following four years. The team initially focused on building a fan base and brand at Torero, noting that the stadium could be expanded to a capacity of 8,000. Moreover, the team noted the possibility of sharing the prospective Snapdragon Stadium, at a 35,000 capacity, as a potential site for future years if they could have cultivated the fan support for it. Snapdragon Stadium would eventually become the home of San Diego FC in 2025.

== Supporters ==
The officially recognized supporter groups were The Locals and the Chavos de Loyal.

== Sponsorship ==
Period	Kit manufacturer	Shirt sponsor
2020–2021	Adidas	Stone Brewing
2022	Charly	Rocket League
2023	Charly	BluPeak Credit Union

== Players and staff ==
=== Final roster ===
As of July 27, 2023

No.	Pos.	Nation	Player
2	MF	USA	Morgan Hackworth
3	DF	USA	Elijah Martin
4	DF	MEX	Carlos Guzmán
5	DF	USA	Grant Stoneman
6	MF	ENG	Charlie Adams
7	MF	USA	Blake Bodily
8	FW	HAI	Ronaldo Damus (on loan from GIF Sundsvall)
9	FW	USA	Evan Conway
10	MF	USA	Alejandro Guido
11	MF	RSA	Tumi Moshobane
13	DF	USA	Camden Riley
14	FW	USA	Adrien Perez
15	MF	USA	Joe Corona
16	DF	TAN	Jackson Kasanzu
17	MF	USA	Collin Martin
18	FW	NZL	Elliot Collier
20	MF	USA	Nick Moon
21	DF	GHA	Ebenezer Ackon
23	DF	ISR	Michael Chilaka
25	GK	ESP	Koke Vegas
50	MF	USA	Xavi Gnaulati
60	GK	USA	Duran Ferree

=== Management and staff ===
As of December 2, 2022

Technical Staff
EVP of soccer operations	Landon Donovan
Head coach	Nate Miller
Assistant coach	Tim Daniels
Goalkeeping coach	Matt Hall
Senior advisor	Paul Buckle
Senior advisor	Shannon MacMillan
Front office staff
Chairman	Andrew Vassiliadis
President & CEO	Warren Smith

== Team records ==
=== Year-by-year ===
As of October 23, 2022

San Diego Loyal SC
Season	USL Championship								Playoffs	U.S. Open Cup	Top Scorer ^{1}		Head coach	Team Captain(s)
Season	P	W	L	D	GF	GA	Pts	Pos	Playoffs	U.S. Open Cup	Player	Goals	Head coach	Team Captain(s)
2020	16	6	5	5	17	18	23	4th, Western; Group B	Did not qualify	Cancelled	(United States) Rubio Rubin	7	(United States) Landon Donovan	(United States) Sal Zizzo
2021	32	14	12	6	51	43	48	3rd, Pacific	Conference Quarterfinals	Cancelled	(South Africa) Tumi Moshobane	10	(United States) Landon Donovan	(England) Charlie Adams (United States) Sal Zizzo
2022	34	18	10	6	68	55	60	2nd, Western	Conference Quarterfinals	3rd Round	(Northern Ireland) Kyle Vassell	14	(United States) Landon Donovan	(England) Charlie Adams
2023	34	16	9	9	61	43	57	3rd, Western	Conference Quarterfinals	3rd Round	(Haiti) Ronaldo Damus	15	(United States) Nate Miller	(England) Charlie Adams

1. Top Scorer includes statistics from league matches only.

=== Head coaches ===
- Includes USL Regular Season, USL Playoffs, U.S. Open Cup. Excludes friendlies.

Coach	Nationality	Start	End	Games	Win	Loss	Draw	Win %
Landon Donovan	United States	November 14, 2019	December 2, 2022	86	39	30	17	45.35
Nate Miller	United States	December 2, 2022	October 22, 2023	37	17	11	9	45.95
