= Fresno FC =

Former American professional soccer club

- Full name: Fresno Football Club
- Nicknames: The Foxes; Los Zorros
- Founded: July 26, 2017; 8 years ago
- Dissolved: October 29, 2019; 6 years ago
- Stadium: Chukchansi Park
- Capacity: 10,500
- Owner: Ray Beshoff
- General manager: Frank Yallop
- Head coach: Adam Smith
- League: USL Championship
- 2019: 3rd, Western Conference; Playoffs: Conference Quarterfinals
- Website: www.fresnofc.com
Home colors	Away colors	Third colors

Fresno Football Club was an American professional soccer team based in Fresno, California. Founded in 2017, the team was a member of the USL Championship, a second-tier league in the American Soccer Pyramid. Their first game took place on March 17, 2018. The team folded on October 29, 2019, after the ownership group was unable to secure construction of a soccer-specific stadium. On December 19, 2019, team ownership announced that it was searching for a new location in California for the 2021 USL Championship season. On February 1, 2021, the team's franchise rights were transferred to Monterey Bay FC, an expansion USL Championship team based in Monterey County, California.

== Colors and crest ==
The team colors were sky blue, San Joaquin navy blue, Fuego red. The logo of the team included the initials "AM", a memorial to the deceased wife of an investor. FFC chose the Fox as their mascot and secondary logo on November 7, 2017. The team was also referred to as The Foxes or Los Zorros in Spanish.

=== Sponsorship ===
Period	Kit manufacturer	Shirt sponsor
2018–2019	Adidas	El Mexicano

== Year-by-year ==
As of October 13, 2018

Season	USL Championship								Play-offs	US Open Cup	Top scorer		Head coach	Avg. attendance
Season	P	W	L	D	GF	GA	Pts	Pos	Play-offs	US Open Cup	Player	Goals	Head coach	Avg. attendance
2018	34	9	13	12	44	38	39	12th, Western	did not qualify	Fourth Round	(Argentina) Juan Pablo Caffa (United States) Jemal Johnson	9	(England) Adam Smith	4,871
2019	34	16	9	9	58	44	57	3rd, Western	Conference quarterfinals	Second Round	(United States) Jaime Chavez	12	(England) Adam Smith	4,117
