= 2019 OKC Energy FC season =

OKC Energy
2019 season
- Owner: Prodigal LLC
- Head coach: Steve Cooke
- United Soccer League: Western Conference: 15th
- USL Playoffs: Did not qualify
- U.S. Open Cup: Fourth round (knocked out by FC Dallas)
- Top goalscorer: League: Deshorn Brown (10); All: Deshorn Brown (8)
- Highest home attendance: 5,586 (July 17 vs. Reno)
- Lowest home attendance: 3,096 (June 1 vs. LA Galaxy II)
- Average home league attendance: League: 4,442; All: 4,006
- Biggest win: League/All: 3–1 (March 9 vs. El Paso) (May 14 vs. NTX Rayados, USOC)
- Biggest defeat: League/All: 0–4 (June 12 vs. FC Dallas, USOC); 1–5 (September 28 vs. LA Galaxy II)
Home colors	Away colors

The 2019 OKC Energy FC season was the club's sixth season of existence, and their sixth consecutive season in the USL Championship, the second tier of American soccer. Energy FC also took part in the U.S. Open Cup. The season covers the period from October 14, 2018, to the beginning of the 2020 USLC season.

== Roster ==
As of match played July 27, 2019

No.	Name	Nationality	Position(s)	Date of birth (age)	Signed in	Previous club	Apps	Goals
Goalkeepers
1	Cody Laurendi	(Puerto Rico)	GK	August 15, 1988 (age 38)	2016	(United States) Austin Aztex	96	0
16	Bryan Byars	(United States)	GK	October 2, 1991 (age 35)	2018	(United States) Tulsa Roughnecks FC	12	0
72	Harrison Bouma	(United States)	GK	December 22, 2000 (age 25)	2019	(United States) Sporting KC Academy	0	0
Defenders
2	Chris Duvall	(United States)	DF	September 10, 1991 (age 35)	2019	(United States) Houston Dynamo	2	7
3	Kyle Hyland	(United States)	DF	March 1, 1991 (age 35)	2016	(United States) Indy Eleven	109	7
5	Christian Ibeagha	(United States)	DF	January 10, 1990 (age 36)	2018	(United States) North Carolina FC	59	3
13	Nicolas Taravel	(France)	DF	October 13, 1994 (age 32)	2019	(France) Grenoble	3	0
15	Atiba Harris	(Saint Kitts and Nevis)	DF	January 9, 1985 (age 41)	2018	(Mexico) Murciélagos	45	2
19	Max Gunderson	(United States)	DF	November 5, 1989 (age 37)	2018	(United States) OKC Energy U23	14	0
25	Amir Šašivarević	(Germany)	DF	October 8, 1994 (age 32)	2019	(United States) Lane United FC	5	1
55	Mekeil Williams	(Trinidad and Tobago)	DF	July 24, 1990 (age 36)	2019	(United States) Richmond Kickers	27	1
61	Alvin Jones	(Trinidad and Tobago)	DF	July 9, 1994 (age 32)	2019	(Trinidad and Tobago) W Connection	20	1
Midfielders
4	Callum Ross	(England)	MF	September 15, 1994 (age 32)	2018	(United States) Charlotte Independence	64	2
7	Rafael Garcia	(United States)	MF	December 19, 1988 (age 37)	2019	(United States) Las Vegas Lights	28	6
8	Ian McGrath	(United States)	MF	July 17, 1996 (age 30)	2019	(United States) Philadelphia Fury	1	0
9	Deshorn Brown	(Jamaica)	FW	December 22, 1990 (age 35)	2018	(Spain) Lorca	34	15
11	Christian Eissele	(United States)	FW	June 23, 1992 (age 34)	2019	(United States) Sacramento Republic	29	7
12	Kal Okot	(England)	MF	October 13, 1993 (age 33)	2019	(United States) OKC Energy U23	6	0
17	Cordell Cato	(Trinidad and Tobago)	FW	July 15, 1992 (age 34)	2019	(United States) Charlotte Independence	28	3
21	Josh García	(Dominican Republic)	MF	July 28, 1993 (age 33)	2019	(United States) OKC Energy U23	3	1
23	Je-Vaughn Watson	(Jamaica)	FW	October 22, 1983 (age 43)	2019	(United States) Charlotte Independence	15	1
26	Jonathan Brown	(Wales)	FW	April 17, 1990 (age 36)	2019	(Bangladesh) Abahani Limited Dhaka	51	1
27	Derek Gebhard	(United States)	FW	October 15, 1995 (age 31)	2019	(United States) El Paso Locomotive FC	6	0
91	Owayne Gordon	(Jamaica)	FW	October 8, 1991 (age 35)	2019	(United States) San Antonio FC	34	5

== Non-competitive ==
=== Preseason ===
February 2 Friendly	Tulsa Golden Hurricane	0–3	OKC Energy	Tulsa, OK
2:00 PM CST			Brown 16'; Garcia,	Stadium: Hurricane Soccer & Track Stadium

February 9 Friendly	Saint Louis FC	0–0	OKC Energy	Springfield, Missouri
2:00 PM CST				Stadium: Allison South Stadium

February 13 Friendly	OKC Energy	5–0	Texas United	Norman, OK
2:00 PM CST	Bustos 12', 32'; Eissele 24'; Trialist 73'; Brown 77'			Stadium: John Crain Field

February 16 Friendly	OKC Energy	3–1	SMU Mustangs	Norman, OK
2:00 PM CST	Bustos 30'; Brown 33', 36'		Ponder 15'	Stadium: John Crain Field
Note: 45-minute first half followed by two 30-minute periods

February 23 Friendly	Phoenix Rising FC	0–2	OKC Energy	Tucson, Arizona
4:00 PM CST	Cochran (yellow card) 51'; Farrell (yellow card) 68'; Flemmings (yellow card) 75'; Musa (red card) 86'	Report	Brown 12'; Gordon 26'; (yellow card) 75'	Stadium: Kino North Stadium

February 27 Friendly	New Mexico United	3–1	OKC Energy	Tucson, Arizona
1:00 PM CST	Soler; Moar; Frater	Report	Eissele 60'	Stadium: Kino Sports Complex

March 2 Friendly	El Paso Locomotive FC	0–2	OKC Energy	Tucson, Arizona
1:00 PM CST				Stadium: Kino North Stadium

== Competitions ==
=== USL Championship ===
==== Standings ====
Pos	Team	Pld	W	D	L	GF	GA	GD	Pts
13	Las Vegas Lights FC	34	11	8	15	46	56	−10	41
14	Portland Timbers 2	34	10	8	16	65	71	−6	38
15	OKC Energy FC	34	9	11	14	45	58	−13	38
16	Tulsa Roughnecks	34	8	10	16	45	69	−24	34
17	Tacoma Defiance	34	8	7	19	42	82	−40	31

Source: USL Championship Standings
Rules for classification: 1) total wins; 2) total goal differential; 3) total goals scored; 4) points earned against top four Conference finishers; 5) disciplinary points; 6) coin toss or drawing of lots

==== Results summary ====
Overall								Home						Away					
Pld	W	D	L	GF	GA	GD	Pts	W	D	L	GF	GA	GD	W	D	L	GF	GA	GD
32	9	11	12	44	53	−9	38	5	6	4	20	20	0	4	5	8	24	33	−9

Source: USLC standings

==== Results by round ====
Round	1	2	3	4	5	6	7	8	9	10	11	12	13	14	15	16	17	18	19	20	21	22	23	24	25	26	27	28	29	30	31	32	33	34
Stadium	A	H	A	A	H	A	H	A	H	A	H	H	H	A	A	H	H	A	H	H	A	A	H	H	A	H	A	H	A	H	A	A	H	A
Result	W	W	L	D	L	L	W	D	W	L	D	W	D	D	D	D	L	W	D	L	L	W	D	L	W	W	D	L	L	D	L	L	L	L

Source: Energy FC schedule
A = Away; H = Home; W = Win; D = Draw; L = Loss

==== Match results ====
March 9 1	El Paso Locomotive	1–3	OKC Energy	El Paso, TX
8:30 PM CST	Gebhard 16'; Kiffe (yellow card) 49'	Report	Brown 1', 54'; Harris (yellow card) 43'; Cato 81'	Stadium: Southwest University Park; Attendance: 8,324; Referee: Matthew Thompson

March 16 2	OKC Energy	2–1	Las Vegas Lights	Oklahoma City, OK
7:30 PM CDT	Brown 13'; Harris (yellow card) 49'; Ross (yellow card) 69'; Gordon 78'	Report	Scaglia (yellow card) 26'; Torre 58'	Stadium: Taft Stadium; Attendance: 5,544; Referee: Sergii Demianchuk

March 24 3	Sacramento Republic	4–1	OKC Energy	Sacramento, CA
4:00 PM CDT	Iwasa 16', 21' (pen.), 27'; Werner 45+4'; Saari (yellow card) 47'; Skundrich (yellow card) 80'; Blackwood (yellow card) 90+2'	Report	R. Garcia 29', (yellow card) 69'	Stadium: Papa Murphy's Park; Attendance: 9,857; Referee: Mark Allatin

March 30 4	Reno 1868	3–3	OKC Energy	Reno, NV
8:00 PM CDT	Brown 26'; Casiple 51'; Seymore (yellow card) 54'; Gleadle 56'; Carroll (yellow card) 86'; Lacroix (yellow card) 86'	Report	R. Garcia (yellow card) 62'; Boesetti 72'; Eissele 90+2'; Gordon 90+4'	Stadium: Greater Nevada Field; Attendance: 3,250; Referee: Elijio Arreguin

April 6 5	OKC Energy	2–3	Portland Timbers 2	Oklahoma City, OK
7:30 PM CDT	da Fonte 22'; Cato 25'; Williams (yellow card) 55'; Ross (yellow card) 87'	Report	Diz (yellow card) 5'; Hurtado 68'; Kobayashi 79'; Sierakowski 90+1'	Stadium: Taft Stadium; Attendance: 3,396; Referee: Elton Garcia

April 13 6	Rio Grande Valley FC	2–1	OKC Energy	Edinburg, TX
7:30 PM CDT	Salazar 54'; Enríquez 87', (yellow card) 88'; Foster (yellow card) 90+4'	Report	Harris (yellow card) 58', (goal) 90+2'	Stadium: H-E-B Park; Attendance: 3,387; Referee: Arturo Ibarra

April 20 7	OKC Energy	1–0	Orange County SC	Oklahoma City, OK
7:30 PM CDT	Jones 4'; Ross (yellow card) 79'	Report	Arellano (yellow card) 75'	Stadium: Taft Stadium; Attendance: 4,611; Referee: Mike Lavergne

April 27 8	Tulsa Roughnecks FC	1–1	OKC Energy	Tulsa, OK
7:00 PM CDT	Silva 4'; Roberts (yellow card) 31'; Addai (yellow card) 36'; Hedrick (yellow card) 84'; Ajeakwa (yellow card) 90'	Report	Gordon 32'; R. Garcia (yellow card) 79'	Stadium: Oneok Field; Attendance: 3,620; Referee: Eric Tattersall

May 4 9	OKC Energy	2–1	Tacoma Defiance	Oklahoma City, OK
7:30 PM CDT	Brown 13', 70' da Fonte (yellow card) 42'	Report	Daley (yellow card) 16'; Gonzalez 40'; Hinds (yellow card) 47'	Stadium: Taft Stadium; Attendance: 3,338; Referee: Matthew Thompson

May 10 10	Austin Bold	2–1	OKC Energy	Austin, TX
7:30 PM CDT	Guadarrama (yellow card) 11'; Saramutin (yellow card) 56', (goal) 61'; Kléber (yellow card) 76', (goal) 80' (pen.)	Report	Brown 28'; Williams (yellow card) 30'	Stadium: Bold Stadium; Attendance: 1,804; Referee: Elton Garcia

May 18 11	OKC Energy	1–1	Real Monarchs	Oklahoma City, OK
7:30 PM CDT	R.García (yellow card) 34'; Watson (yellow card) 36'; Cato 71'	Report	Schmitt 90+3'	Stadium: Taft Stadium; Attendance: 4,031; Referee: Greg Dopka

May 25 12	OKC Energy	1–0	Colorado Springs Switchbacks	Oklahoma City, OK
7:30 PM CDT	Gordon 15'; R.García (yellow card) 87'	Report	Jome (yellow card) 37'	Stadium: Taft Stadium; Attendance: 4,597; Referee: Matthew Corrigan

June 1 13	OKC Energy	0–0	LA Galaxy II	Oklahoma City, OK
8:00 PM CDT	Gordon (yellow card) 46'; Harris (yellow card) 53'	Report	Ontiveros (yellow card) 57'; Vera (yellow card) 67'	Stadium: Taft Stadium; Attendance: 3,096; Referee: Sergii Demianchuk

June 5 14	New Mexico United	1–1	OKC Energy	Albuquerque, NM
8:00 PM CDT	Sandoval 43'; Frater (yellow card) 62'	Report	Bosetti (yellow card) 49'; Brown 73'	Stadium: Isotopes Park; Attendance: 13,574; Referee: Ismir Pekmic

June 8 15	Fresno FC	1–1	OKC Energy	Fresno, CA
9:30 PM CDT	Johnson 8'	Report	Harris (yellow card) 33'; Šašivarević (yellow card) 39'; Brown 79'	Stadium: Chukchansi Park; Attendance: 3,428; Referee: Alejandro Aguilera

June 15 16	OKC Energy	1–1	San Antonio FC	Oklahoma City, OK
8:00 PM CDT	R.Garcia 55' (pen.) da Fonte (yellow card) 85'	Report	Barmby 90+1'	Stadium: Taft Stadium; Attendance: 3,415; Referee: Lorant Varga

June 22 17	OKC Energy	1–4	Phoenix Rising	Oklahoma City, OK
8:00 PM CDT	Garcia 31' (pen.), (yellow card) 48' da Fonte (yellow card) 58'; Harris (yellow card) 78'	Report	Farrell (yellow card) 9' (red card) 29'; Harris 15' (o.g.); Asante 18', 79', (yellow card) 48'; Bakero 54'	Stadium: Taft Stadium; Attendance: 4,422; Referee: Elvis Osmanovic

June 29 18	Las Vegas Lights	0–1	OKC Energy	Las Vegas, NV
9:30 PM CDT	Garcia-Lopez (yellow card) 14'; Robinson (yellow card) 35'	Report	J. Brown (yellow card) 66'; Jones (yellow card) 69'; Bosetti (yellow card) 83'; D.Brown 89'	Stadium: Cashman Field; Attendance: 9,418; Referee: Victor Rivas

July 6 19	OKC Energy	1–1	El Paso Locomotive	Oklahoma City, OK
8:00 PM CDT	J. Brown (yellow card) 27'; R. García 29' (pen.), (yellow card) 53'; Harris (yellow card) 42'; Ibeagha (yellow card) 76'	Report	Beckie (yellow card) 28'; Williams 62' (o.g.)	Stadium: Taft Stadium; Attendance: 4,585; Referee: Thomas Snyder

July 17 20	OKC Energy	2–3	Reno 1868	Oklahoma City, OK
8:00 PM CDT	J. Brown 2'; Gordon 23'; R. Garcia (yellow card) 54'; Watson (yellow card) 79'	Report	Mfeka 66'; Apodaca 71'; Hertzog 77', (yellow card) 78'	Stadium: Taft Stadium; Attendance: 5,586; Referee: Lukasz Szpala

July 20 21	Colorado Springs Switchbacks	1–0	OKC Energy	Colorado Springs, CO
7:00 PMCDT	Rwatubyaye (yellow card) 25' (yellow-red card) 83'; Jome 51'; Argueta (yellow card) 72'; Hundley (yellow card) 82'	Report	Ross (yellow card) 45+1'	Stadium: Weidner Field; Attendance: 3,727; Referee: Joseph Salinas

July 27 22	Tacoma Defiance	0–2	OKC Energy	Tacoma, WA
9:00 PM CDT		Report	Gordon (yellow card) 15'; Ross (yellow card) 53'; Hyland 77'; Harris 89'	Stadium: Cheney Stadium; Attendance: 2,291; Referee: Farhad Dadkho

August 3 23	OKC Energy	1–1	Tulsa Roughnecks FC	Oklahoma City, OK
8:00 PM CDT	Eissele 17'; Watson (yellow card) 33' (yellow-red card) 63'; Eissele (yellow card) 74'	Report	da Costa 23'; Hedrick (yellow card) 33'; Rezende (yellow card) 38'	Stadium: Taft Stadium; Attendance: 5,013; Referee: Alejandro Aguilera Jr

August 10 24	OKC Energy	1–2	Fresno FC	Oklahoma City, OK
8:00 PM CDT	Hyland 23'; Eissele (yellow card) 60'	Report	Chávez 27' , (yellow card) 55'; Ellis-Hayden (yellow card) 56' del Campo 79'	Stadium: Taft Stadium; Attendance: 3,853; Referee: Adam Kilpatrick

August 16 25	Portland Timbers 2	2–4	OKC Energy	Portland, OR
9:30 PM CDT	Calixtro 4'; Sierakowski 28'; Ojeda (yellow card) 90+2'	Report	Eissele 20', 56'; Williams 53'; Ibeagha 86'	Stadium: Providence Park; Attendance: 1,546; Referee: Elijio Arreguin

August 24 26	OKC Energy	4–2	Austin Bold	Oklahoma City, OK
8:00 PM CDT	Ross (yellow card) 11'; Watson (yellow card) 19'; Lima 24' (o.g.); R. García 27'; Eissele 31'; D. Brown 42'	Report	Guadarrama (yellow card) 22'; Okugo (yellow card) 26'; Tyrpak 77'; Faris 88'	Stadium: Taft Stadium; Attendance: 4,016; Referee: Gustavo Solorio

August 30 27	Real Monarchs	2–2	OKC Energy	Herriman, UT
9:00 PMCDT	Plewa 45+1', (yellow card) 51'; Martínez 78'	Report	Ibeagha (yellow card) 21'; R. Garcia 52'; Brown 80'; Jones (yellow card) 90'	Stadium: Zions Bank Stadium; Attendance: 2,091; Referee: Sergii Demianchuk

September 8 28	OKC Energy	1–3	New Mexico United	Oklahoma City, OK
6:00 PM CDT	Williams (yellow card) 15'; Brown 57'; Harris (yellow card) 86'; R. Garcia (yellow card) 86'	Report	Sandoval 11', 16' (pen.); Tetteh (yellow card) 21'; Guzman (yellow card) 45'; Wehan 71'; Suggs (yellow card) 72'	Stadium: Taft Stadium; Attendance: 4,293; Referee: Mark Allatin

September 14 29	San Antonio FC	3–1	OKC Energy	San Antonio, TX
7:30 PM CDT	Castillo 12'; López 26'; Harris 48' (o.g.); Pecka (yellow card) 81'	Report	Watson (yellow card) 35'; Ibeagha (yellow card) 44'; Brown 77' (pen.); Gordon (yellow card) 78'; Harris (yellow card) 90'	Stadium: Toyota Field; Attendance: 6,759; Referee: Ismir Pekmic

September 22 30	OKC Energy	0–0	Sacramento Republic	Oklahoma City, OK
6:00 PM CDT	Williams (yellow card) 43'	Report	Saari (yellow card) 89'	Stadium: Taft Stadium; Attendance: 5,169; Referee: Lukasz Szpala

September 28 31	LA Galaxy II	5–1	OKC Energy	Carson, CA
9:00 PM CDT	Koreniuk 23'; Zubak 40', 73'; Williams 80'; Hernández 83'	Report	Brown 7'; Gordon (yellow card) 34'; Ross (yellow card) 56'	Stadium: Dignity Health Sports Park Track & Field Stadium; Referee: Victor Rivas

October 5 32	Orange County SC	2–0	OKC Energy	Irvine, CA
9:00 PM CDT	Forrester 53'; Leonardo (yellow card) 74'; Amico 75'	Report	Hyland (yellow card) 25' (yellow-red card) 43'	Stadium: Championship Soccer Stadium; Attendance: 3,428; Referee: Michael Radchuk

October 13 33	OKC Energy	0–2	Rio Grande Valley FC	Oklahoma City, OK
6:00 PM CDT		Report	Donovan 70'; Small 78' (pen.)	Stadium: Taft Stadium; Attendance: 6,549; Referee: Daniel Gutierrez

October 18 34	Phoenix Rising	3–1	OKC Energy	Tempe, AZ
9:30 PM CDT	Jahn 21', 70'; Lubin (yellow card) 26'; Lambert 32'	Report	Ibeagha (yellow card) 13'; Harris (yellow card) 50'; Ross (yellow card) 62'; Brown 73'; Hyland (yellow card) 82'; Williams (yellow card) 90'	Stadium: Phoenix Rising FC Soccer Complex; Referee: Dejan Susak

=== U.S. Open Cup ===
As a member of the USL Championship, OKC Energy will enter the tournament in the second round, to be played May 14, 2019

May 14 Second round	OKC Energy FC (Oklahoma)	3–1	(Texas) NTX Rayados	Norman, Oklahoma
7:30 PM CDT	Sasivarevic 51'; Eissele 81' (pen.); Watson 90+4' (pen.)	Report	Okeke 62'; Frías (yellow card) 90+3'	Stadium: John Crain Field; Attendance: 417; Referee: Michael Cap

May 28 Third round	OKC Energy FC (Oklahoma)	4–3	(Florida) Tampa Bay Rowdies	Norman, Oklahoma
7:30 PM CDT	Gordon 2'; Boesetti 27', (yellow card) 30'; Eissele 32'; Brown 60'	Report	Allen 20' (pen.), 47'; Najem 24'; Poku (yellow card) 34'	Stadium: John Crain Field; Attendance: 177; Referee: Elton Garcia

June 12 Fourth round	FC Dallas (Texas)	4–0	(Oklahoma) OKC Energy FC	Dallas, Texas
7:00 PM CDT	Hedges 11'; Bressan (yellow card) 20'; Barrios 43'; Badji 52'; Ziegler 90' (pen.)	Report	Brown (yellow card) 46'; Ross (yellow card) 55'; Harris (yellow card) 74'	Stadium: Westcott Field; Attendance: 1,296; Referee: Luis Guardia

== Statistics ==
=== Appearances and goals ===
No.	Pos.	Name	USL		U.S. Open Cup		Total	
No.	Pos.	Name	Apps	Goals	Apps	Goals	Apps	Goals
1	GK	(Puerto Rico) Cody Laurendi	32	0	1	0	33	0
2	DF	(United States) Chris Duvall	6	0	0	0	6	0
3	DF	(United States) Kyle Hyland	21	2	2	0	23	2
4	MF	(England) Callum Ross	32	0	2	0	33	0
5	DF	(United States) Christian Ibeagha	30	1	3	0	33	1
7	MF	(United States) Rafael Garcia	28	4	3	0	31	4
8	MF	(England) Ian McGrath	1	0	0	0	1	0
9	FW	(Jamaica) Deshorn Brown	30	15	2	1	32	16
11	FW	(United States) Christian Eissele	29	4	3	2	32	6
12	MF	(England) Kal Okot	4	0	2	0	6	0
13	DF	(France) Nicolas Taravel	3	0	0	0	3	0
15	DF	(Saint Kitts and Nevis) Atiba Harris	33	2	1	0	34	2
16	GK	(United States) Bryan Byars	2	0	2	0	4	0
17	FW	(Trinidad and Tobago) Cordell Cato	30	3	1	0	31	3
19	DF	(United States) Max Gunderson	0	0	1	0	1	0
21	MF	(Dominican Republic) Josh García	0	0	2	0	2	0
23	MF	(Jamaica) Je-Vaughn Watson	16	0	2	1	18	1
25	DF	(Germany) Amir Sasivarevic	3	0	2	1	5	1
26	FW	(Wales) Jonathan Brown	10	1	0	0	10	1
27	FW	(United States) Derek Gebhard	5	0	0	0	5	0
55	DF	(Trinidad and Tobago) Mekeil Williams	28	2	1	0	29	2
61	DF	(Trinidad and Tobago) Alvin Jones	21	0	0	0	21	0
91	FW	(Jamaica) Owayne Gordon	34	5	3	1	'37	6
Players who left the club during the season:
2	DF	(United States) Mike da Fonte	12	0	3	0	15	1
6	DF	(Canada) Drew Beckie	1	0	1	0	2	0
10	FW	(France) Alexy Bosetti	25	2	3	0	25	2
22	MF	(Canada) Marco Bustos	7	0	0	0	7	0

Source: Energy FC stats

=== Disciplinary record ===
No.	Pos.	Name	USL		U.S. Open Cup		Total	
No.	Pos.	Name	Yellow card	Red card	Yellow card	Red card	Yellow card	Red card
3	DF	(United States) Kyle Hyland	1	1	0	0	1	1
4	MF	(England) Callum Ross	8	0	1	0	8	0
5	DF	(United States) Christian Ibeagha	4	0	0	0	4	0
7	MF	(United States) Rafael Garcia	9	0	0	0	9	0
9	FW	(Jamaica) Deshorn Brown	0	0	1	0	1	0
11	FW	(United States) Christian Eissele	2	0	0	0	2	0
15	DF	(Saint Kitts and Nevis) Atiba Harris	10	0	1	0	10	0
23	MF	(Jamaica) Je-Vaughn Watson	5	1	0	0	5	1
25	DF	(Germany) Amir Sasivarevic	1	0	0	0	1	0
26	FW	(Wales) Jonathan Brown	2	0	0	0	2	0
27	FW	(United States) Derek Gebhard	1	0	0	0	1	0
55	DF	(Trinidad and Tobago) Mekeil Williams	2	0	0	0	2	0
61	DF	(Trinidad and Tobago) Alvin Jones	2	0	0	0	2	0
91	FW	(Jamaica) Owayne Gordon	2	0	0	0	2	0
Players who left the club during the season:
2	DF	(United States) Mike da Fonte	3	0	0	0	3	0

Source: Energy FC stats

=== Clean sheets ===
No.	Name	USL	U.S. Open Cup	Total	Games Played		
No.	Name	1	(Puerto Rico) Cody Laurendi	6	0	6	32
16	(United States) Bryan Byars	0	0	0	4		
72	(United States) Harrison Bouma	0	0	0	0		

Source: Energy FC stats

== Transfers ==
=== Out ===
Pos.	Player	Transferred to	Fee/notes	Date	Source
FW	(Wales) Jonathan Brown	(United States) Hartford Athletic	Contract expired.	Oct 29, 2018	
MF	(United States) Justin Chavez		Contract expired.	Oct 29, 2018	
FW	(United States) Alex Dixon	(United States) Hartford Athletic	Contract expired. Signed for Hartford on Dec 18, 2018.	Oct 29, 2018	
DF	(Jamaica) Richard Dixon	(United States) Chattanooga Red Wolves	Option declined. Signed for Chattanooga on Dec 5, 2018.	Oct 29, 2018	
MF	(Mexico) Miguel González	(United States) Miami FC	Contract expired.	Oct 29, 2018	
MF	(United States) Juan Guzman	(United States) New Mexico United	Contract expired. Signed for New Mexico on Nov 6, 2018.	Oct 29, 2018	
DF	(United States) Shawn McLaws		Option declined.	Oct 29, 2018	
MF	(New Zealand) Monty Patterson	(Norway) Hønefoss BK	Option declined.	Oct 29, 2018	
MF	(Denmark) Philip Rasmussen	(United States) Hartford Athletic	Contract expired.	Oct 29, 2018	
FW	(United States) Christian Volesky	(United States) Pittsburgh Riverhounds SC	Contract expired.	Oct 29, 2018	
GK	(United States) Matt Van Oekel	(United States) Birmingham Legion	OKC receives an undisclosed fee.	Dec 12, 2018	

== Kits ==
Home	Away

Type	Shirt	Shorts	Socks	First appearance / Record
Home	White	White	White	Match 1 @ El Paso / 9–9–11
Away	Blue	Blue	Blue	Match 13 vs LA Galaxy II / 0–2–1

== See also ==
- OKC Energy FC
- 2019 in American soccer
- 2019 USL Championship season
