= 2020 OKC Energy FC season =

OKC Energy
2020 season
- Owner: Prodigal LLC
- Head coach: John Pascarella
- United Soccer League: Western Conf.: 17th Group D: 5th
- USL Championship Playoffs: Did not qualify
- U.S. Open Cup: Cancelled
- Top goalscorer: League: Jaime Chavez (2); All: Jaime Chavez (2)
- Highest home attendance: 4,067 (March 7 vs. Colorado)
- Lowest home attendance: 1,423 (July 22 vs Rio Grande)
- Average home league attendance: Overall: 1,920; Pre-Covid: 4,067; Post-Covid: 1,562
- Biggest win: ATX 1–3 OKC (July 17)
- Biggest defeat: SA 4–0 OKC (August 19)
Home colors	Away colors	Third colors

The 2020 OKC Energy FC season was the club's seventh season of existence, and their seventh consecutive season in the USL Championship, the second tier of American soccer. Energy FC will also take part in the U.S. Open Cup. The season covers the period from October 19, 2019 to the beginning of the 2021 USLC season. The 2020 season was the first for OKC under new head coach John Pascarella, who had previously been the assistant coach at Minnesota United FC. Pascarella became just the third head coach in club history; Steve Cooke had been in charge for the previous two seasons.

== Roster ==
As of match played December 12, 2019

No.	Name	Nationality	Position(s)	Date of birth (age)	Signed in	Previous club	Apps	Goals
Goalkeepers
1	Cody Laurendi	(Puerto Rico)	GK	August 15, 1988 (age 38)	2016	(United States) Austin Aztex	105	0
2	C.J. Cochran	(United States)	GK	September 17, 1991 (age 35)	2020	(United States) Fresno FC	31	0
35	Kyle Ihn	(United States)	GK	December 20, 1994 (age 31)	2020	(United States) Lansing Ignite	0	0
Defenders
3	Kyle Hyland	(United States)	DF	March 1, 1991 (age 35)	2016	(United States) Indy Eleven	117	7
4	Christian Ibeagha	(United States)	DF	April 17, 1995 (age 31)	2020	(United States) North Carolina FC	69	3
5	Joe Amico	(United States)	DF	January 10, 1990 (age 36)	2018	(United States) Orange County SC	11	0
13	Nicolas Taravel	(France)	DF	October 13, 1994 (age 31)	2019	(France) Grenoble	18	0
15	Atiba Harris	(Saint Kitts and Nevis)	DF	January 9, 1985 (age 41)	2018	(Mexico) Murciélagos	56	4
22	Zachary Ellis-Hayden	(Canada)	DF	March 1, 1992 (age 34)	2020	(United States) Fresno FC	15	0
Midfielders
6	Brad Dunwell	(United States)	MF	December 31, 1996 (age 29)	2020	(United States) Rio Grande Valley FC	13	0
7	Rafael Garcia	(United States)	MF	December 19, 1988 (age 37)	2019	(United States) Las Vegas Lights	42	6
8	José Hernández	(Mexico)	MF	April 12, 1996 (age 30)	2020	(United States) LA Galaxy II	15	1
9	Jaime Chavez	(United States)	FW	July 17, 1987 (age 39)	2020	(United States) Fresno FC	16	3
10	Arun Basuljevic	(United States)	MF	December 17, 1995 (age 30)	2020	(United States) Fresno FC	13	0
11	Frank López	(Cuba)	FW	February 25, 1995 (age 31)	2020	(United States) San Antonio FC	6	1
14	Kodai Iida	(Japan)	FW	December 6, 1994 (age 31)	2020	(Canada) HFX Wanderers FC	7	0
17	Cordell Cato	(Trinidad and Tobago)	FW	July 15, 1992 (age 34)	2019	(United States) Charlotte Independence	42	5
18	Tucker Stephenson	(United States)	FW	October 23, 1996 (age 29)	2020	(United States) Swope Park Rangers	11	1
19	Charlie Ward	(England)	MF	February 19, 1995 (age 31)	2020	(Canada) Ottawa Fury	10	0
25	Ray Saari	(United States)	MF	April 18, 1995 (age 31)	2020	(United States) Kansas City Comets	3	0
26	Jonathan Brown	(Wales)	FW	April 17, 1990 (age 36)	2019	(Bangladesh) Abahani Limited Dhaka	71	4
91	Owayne Gordon	(Jamaica)	FW	October 8, 1991 (age 34)	2019	(United States) San Antonio FC	42	6

== Non-competitive ==
=== Preseason ===
January 25 Friendly	OKC Energy	6–1	Mid-American Christian Evangels	Oklahoma City, OK
1:00 PMCST	Chavez 3' (Ellis-Hayden); López 5' (Cato); Trialist #1 (2nd period); Trialist #2 (3rd period); Trialist #3 (3rd period)	Report	(2nd period)	Stadium: Taft Stadium
Note: Played in three 30-minute periods.

January 29 Friendly	FC Dallas	2–3	OKC Energy	Frisco, TX
4:00 PM CST	Mosquera (1st half); Ondrášek (1st half) (2nd half)	Report	Iida (2nd half); Chavez (2nd half)	Stadium: AdvoCare Field 4 at Toyota Soccer Center

February 1 Friendly	San Antonio FC	5–1	OKC Energy	Frisco, TX
1:00 PM CST	Di Renzo 7'; Partain 17' (pen.); Gallegos (2nd half); Trialist (2nd half); Trialist (2nd half)	Report	Gordon (2nd half)	Stadium: Toyota Soccer Center

February 8 Friendly	OKC Energy	2–2	Central Arkansas Bears	Oklahoma City, OK
1:00 PM CST	Chavez; Basuljevic	Report	Goal	Stadium: Taft Stadium
Note: Additional 15 minutes added after full-time.

February 15 Friendly	Sporting Kansas City II	1–1	OKC Energy	Wichita, KS
2:00 PM CST	Rad 85' (pen.)	Report	Chavez 4'	Stadium: Stryker Soccer Complex

February 23 Friendly	New Mexico United	2–1	OKC Energy	Tucson, AZ
2:00 PM CST	Moreno 35'; Sergi 75'	Report	Chavez 40'	Stadium: Kino Sports Complex

February 26 Friendly	El Paso Locomotive FC	3–0	OKC Energy	Tucson, AZ
2:00 PM CST	Lomis 20'; Bosetti (2nd half); Salgado (3rd period)	Report		Stadium: Kino Sports Complex
Note: 120-minute scrimmage.

February 29 Friendly	Grand Canyon Antelopes	0–4	OKC Energy	Phoenix, AZ
2:00 PM CST				Stadium: GCU Stadium

== Competitions ==
=== USL ===
==== Standings ====
Pos	Team	Pld	W	D	L	GF	GA	GD	Pts	PPG	Qualification
1	San Antonio FC	16	10	3	3	30	14	+16	33	2.06	Advance to USL Championship Playoffs
2	FC Tulsa	15	6	7	2	21	16	+5	25	1.67	Advance to USL Championship Playoffs
3	Austin Bold FC	16	5	7	4	30	27	+3	22	1.38	
4	Rio Grande Valley FC Toros	14	2	3	9	17	28	−11	9	0.64	
5	OKC Energy FC	16	1	7	8	12	29	−17	10	0.63	

Source: USL

==== Results summary ====
Overall								Home						Away					
Pld	W	D	L	GF	GA	GD	Pts	W	D	L	GF	GA	GD	W	D	L	GF	GA	GD
10	1	3	6	6	18	−12	6	0	3	3	3	10	−7	1	0	3	3	8	−5

Source: USLC standings

==== Results by round ====
Round	1	2	3	4	5	6	7	8	9	10	11	12	13	14	15	16
Stadium	H	H	A	H	H	H	H	A	A	H	A	A	A	H	A	A
Result	L	D	W	D	L	L	D	L	L	D	D	D	L	D	L	L

Source: Energy FC schedule
A = Away; H = Home; W = Win; D = Draw; L = Loss

==== Match results ====
March 7 1	OKC Energy	1–2	Colorado Springs	Oklahoma City, OK
7:00 PM CST	Ward (yellow card) 53'; Harris 58'; Chavez (yellow card) 62'	Report	Volesky 16'; Lewis (yellow card) 33'; Stephenson 78' (o.g.); Diz Pe (yellow card) 90+5'	Stadium: Taft Stadium; Attendance: 4,067; Referee: Eric Tattersall

July 13 2	OKC Energy	1–1	FC Tulsa	Oklahoma City, OK
7:00 PM CDT	Chavez 40'; Hyland (yellow card) 51'; Basuljevic (yellow card) 53'; Harris (yellow card) 88'	Report	da Costa 45+5'	Stadium: Taft Stadium; Attendance: 1,626; Referee: Matthew Corrigan

July 17 3	Austin Bold FC	1–3	OKC Energy	Austin, TX
8:00 PM CDT	Ciss (yellow card) 12'; Guadarrama 33'; Gladiator (yellow card) 58'; Okugo (yellow card) 68'	Report	Harris (yellow card) 11'; Hernández (yellow card) 18', (goal) 90+4'; Brown 29'; Cato (yellow card) 38'; Chavez 64' (pen.)	Stadium: Bold Stadium; Attendance: 18; Referee: Lorenzo Hernandez

July 22 4	OKC Energy	1–1	Rio Grande Valley FC	Oklahoma City, OK
7:00 PM CDT	López (yellow card) 62', (goal) 88'; Ellis-Hayden (yellow card) 63'; Hernández (yellow card) 90+10'	Report	Beckford 11'; Kibato (yellow card) 20'; Coronado (yellow card) 90+7'; Taiberson (yellow card) 90+8'	Stadium: Taft Stadium; Attendance: 1,423; Referee: Michael Cap

August 1 5	OKC Energy	0–3	New Mexico United	Oklahoma City, OK
7:00 PM CDT	Ibeagha (yellow card) 86'; Chavez (yellow card) 87'	Report	Moreno 31'; Wehan 45+3'; Mizell (yellow card) 82'; Ahlinvi 90+4'	Stadium: Taft Stadium; Attendance: 1,582; Referee: Matthew Corrigan

August 8 6	OKC Energy	0–3	San Antonio FC	Oklahoma City, OK
7:00 PM CDT	Hernández (yellow card) 12'; Hyland (yellow card) 21'; López (yellow card) 42'; Taravel (yellow card) 69'	Report	Di Renzo (yellow card) 29'; Parano 31'; Montgomery 70'; Bailone (yellow card) 73', (goal) 77'	Stadium: Taft Stadium; Attendance: 1,455; Referee: Lorenzo Hernandez

August 15 7	OKC Energy	0–0	Rio Grande Valley FC	Oklahoma City, OK
7:00 PM CDT	Ellis-Hayden (yellow card) 14'	Report		Stadium: Taft Stadium; Attendance: 1,425; Referee: Nima Saghafi

August 19 8	San Antonio FC	4–0	OKC Energy	San Antonio, TX
8:00 PM CDT	Solignac 3'; PC 14' (pen.), (yellow card) 25'; Taintor 42', (yellow card) 45+4'; Gorskie (yellow card) 66'; Di Renzo 67'	Report	Brown (yellow card) 28'; Hernández (yellow card) 41'	Stadium: Toyota Field; Referee: Héctor Hernández

August 22 9	Sporting Kansas City II	3–0	OKC Energy	Kansas City, KS
7:00 PM CDT	Harris 5', 22', (yellow card) 54'; Barbir (yellow card) 19', (goal) 66'; Mompremier (yellow card) 42'; Rešetar (yellow card) 87'	Report	Brown (yellow card) 60'	Stadium: Children's Mercy Park; Referee: Jon Freemon

August 30 10	OKC Energy	1–1	Austin Bold FC	Oklahoma City, OK
7:00 PM CDT	Taravel (yellow card) 28'; García (yellow card) 31' (yellow-red card) 51'; Harris (yellow card) 38'; Chavez 41', (yellow card) 57'	Report	Forbes 14'; Kléber (yellow card) 31'; Ortíz (yellow card) 90'; Saramutin (yellow card) 90+3'	Stadium: Taft Stadium; Attendance: 1,540; Referee: Lorenzo Hernandez

September 5 11	Colorado Springs	0–0	OKC Energy	Colorado Springs, Colorado
7:00 PM CDT	Argueta (yellow card) 89'	Report	Hernández (yellow card) 34'; Taravel (yellow card) 90+2'; Ellis-Hayden (red card) 90+9'	Stadium: Weidner Field; Attendance: 1,000; Referee: Calin Radosav

September 12 12	FC Tulsa	1–1	OKC Energy	Tulsa, OK
7:00 PM CDT	Marlon (yellow card) 55'; Suárez 73'; Moloto (yellow card) 81'	Report	Chavez (yellow card) 35'; Hernández (yellow card) 71' (yellow-red card) 77'; Gordon 90'; Ibeagha (yellow card) 90+5'	Stadium: ONEOK Field; Attendance: 2,932; Referee: Lukasz Szpala

September 19 13	San Antonio FC	2–0	OKC Energy	San Antonio, TX
8:00 PM CDT	Perruzza 45', 52'; Bailone (yellow card) 89'	Report	Dunwell (yellow card) 63'; Chávez (yellow card) 67'; Stephenson (yellow card) 85'; Taravel (yellow card) 88'	Stadium: Toyota Field; Attendance: 1,122; Referee: Gerald Flores

September 27 14	OKC Energy	0–0	Austin Bold FC	Oklahoma City, OK
7:00 PM CDT	Ibeagha (yellow card) 43'; García (yellow card) 44'; Hernández (yellow card) 67'; Ellis-Hayden (yellow card) 90+8'	Report	Guadarrama (penalty missed) 44'	Stadium: Taft Stadium; Attendance: 1,775; Referee: Brandon Gardner

September 30 15	FC Tulsa	3–2	OKC Energy	Tulsa, OK
7:00 PM CDT	Marlon 15'; Chapman-Page (yellow card) 35'; Uzo 79', 88'; Altamirano (yellow card) 86'	Report	Cato 12'; Taravel (yellow card) 45+2'; Chávez (yellow card) 45+4'; Stephenson 57'; Amico (yellow card) 70'; Ellis-Hayden (yellow card) 84'	Stadium: ONEOK Field; Attendance: 2,320; Referee: Matthew Thompson

October 3 16	Rio Grande Valley FC	4–2	OKC Energy	Edinburg, TX
8:00 PM CDT	Edwards 6'; Azócar 39'; Amico 43' (o.g.); Obregón 67'	Report	Cato 12'; Brown 83'	Stadium: H-E-B Park; Attendance: 956; Referee: Melvin Rivas

=== U.S. Open Cup ===
April 7–9 Second round	Denton Diablos FC (NPSL) (Texas) or NTX Rayados (LQ) (Texas)	v	(Oklahoma) OKC Energy FC (USLC)	Denton, Texas or TBD
				Stadium: University of North Texas Soccer Stadium or TBD
Note: Match postponed due to the COVID-19 pandemic

== Statistics ==
=== Appearances and goals ===
No.	Pos.	Name	USL		U.S. Open Cup		Total	
No.	Pos.	Name	Apps	Goals	Apps	Goals	Apps	Goals
1	GK	(Puerto Rico) Cody Laurendi	4	0	0	0	4	0
2	GK	(United States) C.J. Cochran	13	0	0	0	13	0
3	DF	(United States) Kyle Hyland	8	0	0	0	8	0
4	DF	(United States) Christian Ibeagha	14	0	0	0	14	0
5	DF	(United States) Joe Amico	11	0	0	0	11	0
6	MF	(United States) Brad Dunwell	13	0	0	0	13	0
7	MF	(United States) Rafael Garcia	14	0	0	0	14	0
8	MF	(Mexico) José Hernández	15	1	0	0	15	1
9	FW	(United States) Jaime Chavez	16	3	0	0	16	3
10	MF	(United States) Arun Basuljevic	13	0	0	0	13	0
11	FW	(Cuba) Frank López	6	1	0	0	6	1
12	DF	(Mexico) Ramón Martín del Campo	4	0	0	0	4	0
13	DF	(France) Nicolas Taravel	15	0	0	0	15	0
14	FW	(Japan) Kodai Iida	7	0	0	0	7	0
15	DF	(Saint Kitts and Nevis) Atiba Harris	8	1	0	0	8	1
17	FW	(Trinidad and Tobago) Cordell Cato	12	0	0	0	12	0
18	FW	(United States) Tucker Stephenson	11	1	0	0	11	1
19	MF	(England) Charlie Ward	10	0	0	0	10	0
22	DF	(Canada) Zachary Ellis-Hayden	15	0	0	0	15	0
25	MF	(United States) Ray Saari	3	0	0	0	3	0
26	FW	(Wales) Jonathan Brown	15	1	0	0	15	1
35	GK	(United States) Kyle Ihn	0	0	0	0	0	0
44	DF	(United States) Mike da Fonte	2	0	0	0	2	0
91	FW	(Jamaica) Owayne Gordon	8	0	0	0	8	0

Source: Energy FC stats

=== Disciplinary record ===
No.	Pos.	Name	USL		U.S. Open Cup		Total	
No.	Pos.	Name	Booked	Sent off (straight red)	Booked	Sent off (straight red)	Booked	Sent off (straight red)
3	DF	(United States) Kyle Hyland	2	0	0	0	2	0
4	DF	(United States) Christian Ibeagha	3	0	0	0	3	0
5	DF	(United States) Joe Amico	1	0	0	0	1	0
6	MF	(United States) Brad Dunwell	1	0	0	0	1	0
7	MF	(United States) Rafael Garcia	2	1	0	0	2	1
8	MF	(Mexico) José Hernández	7	1	0	0	7	1
9	FW	(United States) Jaime Chavez	6	0	0	0	6	0
10	MF	(United States) Arun Basuljevic	1	0	0	0	1	0
11	FW	(Cuba) Frank López	2	0	0	0	2	0
13	DF	(France) Nicolas Taravel	5	0	0	0	5	0
15	DF	(Saint Kitts and Nevis) Atiba Harris	3	0	0	0	3	0
17	FW	(Trinidad and Tobago) Cordell Cato	1	0	0	0	1	0
18	FW	(United States) Tucker Stephenson	1	0	0	0	1	0
19	MF	(England) Charlie Ward	1	0	0	0	1	0
22	DF	(Canada) Zachary Ellis-Hayden	4	0	0	0	4	0
26	FW	(Wales) Jonathan Brown	2	0	0	0	2	0

Source: Energy FC stats

=== Clean sheets ===
No.	Name	USL	U.S. Open Cup	Total	Games Played		
No.	Name	1	(Puerto Rico) Cody Laurendi	0	0	0	1
2	(United States) C.J. Cochran	1	0	1	8		
35	(United States) Kyle Ihn	0	0	0	0		

Source: Energy FC stats

== Transfers ==
=== In ===
Pos.	Player	Transferred from	Fee/notes	Date	Source
MF	(United States) Arun Basuljevic	(United States) Fresno FC		Dec 17, 2019	
DF	(Canada) Zachary Ellis-Hayden	(United States) Fresno FC		Dec 17, 2019	
MF	(Japan) Kodai Iida	(Canada) HFX Wanderers		Dec 18, 2019	
FW	(United States) Jaime Chavez	(United States) Fresno FC		Dec 19, 2019	
MF	(Mexico) José Hernández	(United States) LA Galaxy II		Dec 19, 2019	
GK	(United States) C. J. Cochran	(United States) Fresno FC		Dec 20, 2019	
DF	(United States) Joe Amico	(United States) Orange County SC		Jan 7, 2020	
MF	(United States) Brad Dunwell	(United States) Rio Grande Valley FC Toros		Jan 10, 2020	
GK	(United States) Kyle Ihn	(United States) Lansing Ignite		Jan 10, 2020	
FW	(Cuba) Frank Lopez	(United States) San Antonio FC		Jan 13, 2020	
MF	(England) Charlie Ward	(Canada) Ottawa Fury FC		Jan 14, 2020	
FW	(United States) Tucker Stephenson	(United States) Sporting Kansas City II		Jan 14, 2020	

== Out ==
Pos.	Player	Transferred to	Fee/notes	Date	Source
GK	(United States) Bryan Byars		Contract expired.	Dec 5, 2019	
DF	(United States) Max Gunderson		Contract expired.	Dec 5, 2019	
DF	(United States) Christian Ibeagha		Contract expired.	Dec 5, 2019	
DF	(Trinidad and Tobago) Alvin Jones	(United States) Real Salt Lake	OKC receives an undisclosed fee.	Dec 5, 2019	
DF	(Germany) Amir Šašivarević		Contract expired.	Dec 5, 2019	
DF	(Trinidad and Tobago) Mekeil Williams		Contract expired.	Dec 5, 2019	
MF	(Dominican Republic) Josh García		Contract expired.	Dec 5, 2019	
MF	(England) Kal Okot		Contract expired.	Dec 5, 2019	
MF	(England) Callum Ross		Contract expired.	Dec 5, 2019	
MF	(Jamaica) Je-Vaughn Watson		Contract expired.	Dec 5, 2019	
FW	(Jamaica) Deshorn Brown		Contract expired.	Dec 5, 2019	
FW	(United States) Christian Eissele		Contract expired.	Dec 5, 2019	

== See also ==
- OKC Energy FC
- 2020 in American soccer
- 2020 USL Championship season
