= 2017 OKC Energy FC season =

OKC Energy FC
2017 season
- Chairman: Bob Funk, Jr.
- Manager: Jimmy Nielsen
- Stadium: Taft Stadium
- USL Playoffs: Conference Finals vs Swope Park Rangers
- U.S. Open Cup: Fourth Round vs Colorado Rapids
- Top goalscorer: José Angulo (11)
- Highest home attendance: 6,059; Orange County (May 20)
- Lowest home attendance: 2,650; Reno (August 2)
- Average home league attendance: League:4,293; All: 4,339
- Biggest win: OKC 3–0 LA (10/1); OKC 4–1 SPR (10/8)
- Biggest defeat: RNO 3–0 OKC (9/20)
Home colors	Away colors

The 2017 OKC Energy FC season was the club's fourth season in existence, and their fourth season playing in the USL, the 2nd tier of the American soccer pyramid.

== Background ==
This is the first season where USL will produce and broadcast all of Energy FC games. Last season the games were on KSBI. It had not been announced yet if the games will be televised or just be online. It was announced that all Energy FC matches will be televised on News 9 Plus formally KSBI. Except if the matches being televised on ESPN network

== Roster ==
As of 3/24/2017

No.	Position	Nation	Player
1	GK	PUR	Cody Laurendi
2	DF	JAM	Richard Dixon
3	DF	USA	Kyle Hyland
4	DF	USA	Sam Fink
5	DF	USA	Mickey Daly
6	DF	WAL	Chad Bond
7	MF	DEN	Philip Rasmussen
8	MF	USA	Juan Guzman
9	FW	COL	José Angulo (on loan from Saint Louis FC)
10	FW	MEX	Miguel González
11	FW	USA	Alex Dixon
12	MF	USA	Daniel Gonzalez
14	MF	ESP	José Barril
16	GK	USA	Jacob Lissek
17	MF	WAL	Jonathan Brown
18	GK	USA	C. J. Cochran
19	DF	USA	Michael Harris
21	MF	USA	Coy Craft (on loan from FC Dallas)
22	DF	USA	Anthony Wallace
23	MF	MEX	Luis Martinez
26	DF	USA	Coady Andrews
28	FW	POL	Wojciech Wojcik
29	GK	USA	Carlos Avilez
99	FW	USA	Andy Craven

=== Competitions ===
February 11, 2017 Friendly	OKC Energy FC	3–1	John Brown University	Oklahoma City, Oklahoma
2:00 PM CST	Dixon 13'; Taylor (yellow card) 63', (goal) 78'; González 85'	Report	Omondi 72'	Stadium: Casady School Soccer Field

February 15, 2017 Friendly	OKC Energy FC	2–1	Rogers State University	Oklahoma City, Oklahoma
6:00 PM CST	Jackson 16'; Fink 86'	Report	Kwarteng 50'	Stadium: Speegle Stadium

February 19, 2017 Friendly	FC Cincinnati	2–3	OKC Energy FC	Bradenton, Florida
2:30 PM CST	Dacres (yellow card) 29'; Townsend (yellow card) 32'; Fordyce 60'; Walker (yellow card) 83'; Berry 89'		Covarrubias 14'; Guzman (yellow card) 21'; Wojcik 72', 82'; Martinez (yellow card) 81'	Stadium: IMG Academy

February 23, 2017 Friendly	Ottawa Fury FC	2–1	OKC Energy FC	Bradenton, Florida
5:00 PM CST	Campbell (yellow card) 22'; Rozeboom (red card) 29'; Bruna 35', 67' (pen.)	Report	Barril (yellow card) 20'; Rasmussen 37'; Andrews (yellow card) 49'	Stadium: IMG Academy
Note: Three 30-minute periods.

February 28, 2017 Friendly	Orlando City B	1-3	OKC Energy FC	Bradenton, Florida
11:00 AM CST	Cox 90+'		Andrews 34'; Covarrubias 53'; Fink 56'	Stadium: IMG Academy

March 5, 2017 Friendly	Saint Louis FC	0-0	OKC Energy FC	Springfield, Missouri
3:30 PM CST				Stadium: Greenwood Field, Lake Country Soccer Complex

March 11, 2017 Friendly	OKC Energy FC	5–0	Houston Baptist Huskies	Moore, Oklahoma
12:00 PM CST	González 48'; Martinez 68'; Barril 79' (pen.); König 82'; Zanolli 90' (o.g.)	Report		Stadium: Moore Stadium

March 18, 2017 Friendly	OKC Energy FC	5–1	Omaha Mavericks	Norman, Oklahoma
12:00 PM CDT	González 3', 60'; Dixon 29', 42'; Daly (red card) 38'; Martinez 55'	Report	Ibisevic 77'	Stadium: John Crain Field

April 22, 2017 Friendly	Tulsa Golden Hurricane	1–3	OKC Energy FC	Tulsa, Oklahoma
3:00 PM CDT	Velasquez 70'		Wojcik 44', 60'; Martinez 86'	Stadium: Hurricane Soccer & Track Stadium

July 11, 2016 Friendly	OKC Energy FC (United States)	0–0 (1–3 p)	(Mexico) Pachuca	Oklahoma City, Oklahoma
7:30 PM CDT	Daly (yellow card) 31'; Andrews (yellow card) 42'; Fink (yellow card) 45+'	Report		Stadium: Taft Stadium; Attendance: 5,071
	Penalties
	(penalty scored) Andrews; (penalty missed) Bond; (penalty missed) Angulo; (penalty missed) VanCompernolle		Guzmán (penalty scored); Cano (penalty missed); Urretaviscaya (penalty scored); López (penalty scored)

=== Results summary ===
Overall								Home						Away					
Pld	W	D	L	GF	GA	GD	Pts	W	D	L	GF	GA	GD	W	D	L	GF	GA	GD
32	14	7	11	46	41	+5	49	11	3	2	27	12	+15	3	4	9	19	29	−10

Source: Match reports

Round	1	2	3	4	5	6	7	8	9	10	11	12	13	14	15	16	17	18	19	20	21	22	23	24	25	26	27	28	29	30	31	32
Stadium	A	A	H	H	A	A	H	H	A	H	H	A	A	A	A	H	A	H	A	H	H	A	H	A	A	H	H	A	A	H	H	H
Result	L	D	L	W	L	L	W	W	L	W	D	W	L	D	L	L	D	W	D	W	W	L	D	W	L	D	W	L	W	W	W	W

Updated to match(es) played on June 19, 2017. Source: Match reports
A = Away; H = Home; W = Win; D = Draw; L = Loss

March 25, 2017 1	Swope Park Rangers	3–1	OKC Energy FC	Kansas City, Missouri
7:30 PM CDT	Belmar 42'; Hernandez (yellow card) 45+2'; Blessing 62'; Salloi 71'	Report	Laurendi (yellow card) 15'; Andrews 24'; Rasmussen (yellow card) 47'; Barril (yellow card) 90+1' (yellow-red card) 90+4'	Stadium: Swope Soccer Village; Attendance: 1,060; Referee: Jon Freemon

April 1, 2017 2	Colorado Springs Switchbacks FC	1–1	OKC Energy FC	Colorado Springs, Colorado
7:00 PM CDT	Kacher 20'; Eboussi (yellow card) 68'	Report	Dixon 26'; González (yellow card) 51'; Dixon (yellow card) 73'	Stadium: Weidner Field; Attendance: 2,032; Referee: Younes Marrakchi

April 8, 2017 3	OKC Energy FC	0–1	Rio Grande Valley FC Toros	Oklahoma City, Oklahoma
7:00 PM CDT	Hyland (yellow card) 24'; Dixon (yellow card) 33' (yellow-red card) 75'; Barril (red card) 90+1'; Wojcik (yellow card) 90+4'	Report	Greene (yellow card) 53'; Luna 67' (pen.); Garza (red card) 84'	Stadium: Taft Stadium; Attendance: 5,899; Referee: Andrew Musashe

April 11, 2017 4	OKC Energy FC	1–0	Sacramento Republic FC	Oklahoma City, Oklahoma
7:30 PM CDT	Gonzelez 30'; Wojcik (yellow card) 62'	Report	Christian (yellow card) 45' (yellow-red card) 82'	Stadium: Taft Stadium; Attendance: 3,032; Referee: Travis Haight

April 29, 2017 5	Rio Grande Valley FC Toros	2–0	OKC Energy FC	Edinburg, Texas
7:30 PM CDT	Bird 8'; Holland 38'; Wharton (yellow card) 90'	Report	González (yellow card) 72'; González (yellow card) 90+1'	Stadium: H-E-B Park; Attendance: 7,820; Referee: Michael Radchuk

May 13, 2017 6	Phoenix Rising FC	2–1	OKC Energy FC	Scottsdale, Arizona
9:30 PM CDT	Cortez (yellow card) 48'; Johnson 50'; Wright-Phillips (yellow card) 86', (goal) 90+5'; Greer (yellow card) 90+2'; Bravo (yellow card) 90+2'	Report	Guzmán (yellow card) 87'; Hyland 90+3' (pen.)	Stadium: Phoenix Rising FC Soccer Complex; Attendance: 6,259; Referee: Robi Hullner

May 20, 2017 7	OKC Energy FC	1–0	Orange County SC	Oklahoma City, Oklahoma
7:00 PM CDT	Dixon 35'; González (yellow card) 74'	Report	Sorto (red card) 25'; Navarro (yellow card) 90+2'	Stadium: Taft Stadium; Attendance: 6,059; Referee: Jon Freemon

May 24, 2017 8	OKC Energy FC	2–1	Portland Timbers 2	Oklahoma City, Oklahoma
7:00 PM CDT	González 54', (yellow card) 90+2'; Daly 75'	Report	Lewis (yellow card) 25'; Arboleda (yellow card) 44', (goal) 59'	Stadium: Taft Stadium; Attendance: 3,910; Referee: Calin Radosav

June 3, 2017 9	Colorado Springs Switchbacks FC	1–0	OKC Energy FC	Colorado Springs, Colorado
7:00 PM CDT	Perez (yellow card) 57'; Kacher (yellow card) 83'; Argueta 90+3'	Report	Guzmán (yellow card) 54'; Craven (yellow card) 76'	Stadium: Weidner Field; Attendance: 3,606; Referee: Alejandro Mariscal

June 6, 2017 10	OKC Energy FC	3–2	Phoenix Rising FC	Oklahoma City, Oklahoma
7:30 PM CDT	Guzmán (yellow card) 40'; Wojcik 45+2', 69', (yellow card) 72'; Hyland 56'	Report	Greer 47', (yellow card) 90+1'; Arreola 83'; Watson (yellow card) 85'	Stadium: Taft Stadium; Attendance: 3,632; Referee: Caleb Mendez

June 10, 2017 11	OKC Energy FC	0–0	San Antonio FC	Oklahoma City, Oklahoma
7:30 PM CDT		Report	O'Ojong (yellow card) 45+3'; Newnam (yellow card) 56'; McCarthy (yellow card) 70'	Stadium: Taft Stadium; Attendance: 4,918; Referee: Greg Dopka

June 16, 2017 12	Portland Timbers 2	1–3	OKC Energy FC	Portland, Oregon
9:30 PM CDT	Hanson (yellow card) 18'; Bijev 40' (pen.); Amick (yellow card) 60'	Report	Rasmussen 42'; Andrews (yellow card) 44'; Craven 74' (pen.), 78' (pen.); Bond (yellow card) 90'	Stadium: Providence Park; Attendance: 2,317; Referee: Levi Rippy

June 19, 2017 13	Seattle Sounders FC 2	3–2	OKC Energy FC	Tukwila, Washington
9:30 PM CDT	Mathers 13', 39' (pen.); Parra (yellow card) 33'; Saari (yellow card) 35' (yellow-red card) 90+4'; Olsen 90'	Report	González (red card) 38'; Andrews (yellow card) 54'; Dixon 70'; Daly (yellow card) 76'; Guzmán (yellow card) 78'; Craven 86' (pen.)	Stadium: Starfire Sports Complex; Attendance: 963; Referee: Chipalo Street

June 24, 2017 14	Vancouver Whitecaps FC 2	2–2	OKC Energy FC	Vancouver, British Columbia
5:00 PM CDT	Zator (yellow card) 20' (yellow-red card) 77'; Bartman 56'; Sanner 73'; Bevan (yellow card) 90+3'	Report	Guzmán 34'; Craven 61' (pen.); Daly (yellow card) 76'; Wallace (yellow card) 82'	Stadium: Thunderbird Stadium; Attendance: 729; Referee: Michelle Pye

July 5, 2017 15	Real Monarchs SLC	3–1	OKC Energy FC	Sandy, Utah
8:00 PM CDT	Hanlin 8', (yellow card) 82'; Haber (yellow card) 57'; Hoffman 70', 76'	Report	Dixon 26'; Bond (yellow card) 55'; Andrews (red card) 74'	Stadium: Rio Tinto Stadium; Attendance: 2,065; Referee: Michael Radchuk

July 8, 2017 16	OKC Energy FC	1–2	Tulsa Roughnecks FC	Oklahoma City, Oklahoma
7:30 PM CDT	González 39'; Daly (yellow card) 44'; Bond (yellow card) 45+3'; Dixon (yellow card) 64'	Report	Caffa (yellow card) 45+3', (goal) 50' (pen.); Calistri (yellow card) 60', (goal) 66'; Ugarte (yellow card) 83'; Jadama (yellow card) 86'	Stadium: Taft Stadium; Attendance: 4,682; Referee: Guido Gonzales Jr.

July 14, 2017 17	San Antonio FC	1–1	OKC Energy FC	San Antonio, Texas
8:00 PM CDT	Forbes 52'	Report	Fink (yellow card) 23'; González 90+4'	Stadium: Toyota Field; Attendance: 8,131; Referee: Caleb Mendez

July 22, 2017 18	OKC Energy FC	4–3	Colorado Springs Switchbacks FC	Oklahoma City, Oklahoma
7:30 PM CDT	González 39', 51'; Angulo 45+1', 60'; Andrews (yellow card) 45+2'; Guzmán (yellow card) 65'	Report	Frater (yellow card) 22', (goal) 72'; Burt	Stadium: Taft Stadium; Attendance: 3,283; Referee: José Lara

July 30, 2017 19	LA Galaxy II	1–1	OKC Energy FC	Los Angeles
8:30 PM CDT	Covarrubias (yellow card) 28'; Lassiter 41'	Report	Angulo (yellow card) 11'; Andrews (yellow card) 56'; Craven 75' (pen.)	Stadium: StubHub Center Track and Field Stadium; Attendance: 705; Referee: Daniel Radford

August 2, 2017 20	OKC Energy FC	1–0	Reno 1868 FC	Oklahoma City, Oklahoma
7:30 PM CDT	Barril (yellow card) 29'; Angulo 62'; González (yellow card) 90'	Report	Alashe (red card) 29'	Stadium: Taft Stadium; Attendance: 2,650; Referee: Luis Guardia

August 5, 2017 21	OKC Energy FC	2–0	Real Monarchs SLC	Oklahoma City, Oklahoma
7:30 PM CDT	Dixon 26', 56', (yellow card) 31'; Dixon (yellow card) 52'	Report	Velasquez (yellow card) 58'	Stadium: Taft Stadium; Attendance: 4,087; Referee: Rosendo Mendoza

August 12, 2017 22	Tulsa Roughnecks FC	2–1	OKC Energy FC	Tulsa, Oklahoma
7:30 PM CDT	Rivas 20'; Svantesson 55'	Report	Barril (yellow card) 35'; Angulo 47' (pen.); Dixon (yellow card) 72'; Fink (yellow card) 90+2'	Stadium: ONEOK Field; Attendance: 4,037; Referee: Ismir Pekmic

August 19, 2017 23	OKC Energy FC	0–0	San Antonio FC	Oklahoma City, Oklahoma
7:30 PM CDT	Fink (yellow card) 54'	Report		Stadium: Taft Stadium; Attendance: 4,578; Referee: Jorge Ramirez

August 25, 2017 24	Orange County SC	1–2	OKC Energy FC	Irvine, California
9:30 PM CDT	Meeus (yellow card) 28'; Ewijk 65'; Fernandes (yellow card) 66'; Abolaji (yellow card) 79'	Report	Dixon 35'; Barril (yellow card) 39'; Franco 53' (o.g.); Angulo (yellow card) 63'; Daly (yellow card) 77'	Stadium: Orange County Great Park; Attendance: 1,539; Referee: Marco Vega

September 2, 2017 25	Swope Park Rangers	2–0	OKC Energy FC	Kansas City, Missouri
7:30 PM CDT	Moloto 19' (pen.), 49', (yellow card) 73'; Storm (yellow card) 63'; Belmar (yellow card) 90+2'	Report	Daly (yellow card) 26'	Stadium: Swope Soccer Village; Attendance: 1,073; Referee: Bardhyl Pashaj

September 10, 2017 26	OKC Energy FC	0–0	Vancouver Whitecaps FC 2	Oklahoma City, Oklahoma
5:00 PM CDT		Report	Bladisimo (yellow card) 60'; Chung (yellow card) 83'	Stadium: Taft Stadium; Attendance: 4,351; Referee: Michael Cap

September 17, 2017 27	OKC Energy FC	2–0	Tulsa Roughnecks FC	Oklahoma City, Oklahoma
5:00 PM CDT	González 5'; Barril 13'; Wallace (yellow card) 86'	Report	Rivas (yellow card) 66'; Caffa (yellow card) 86'	Stadium: Taft Stadium; Attendance: 4,351; Referee: Lukas Szpala

September 20, 2017 28	Reno 1868 FC	3–0	OKC Energy FC	Reno, Nevada
9:00 PM CDT	Mfeka 18', 50', 62'; Burgos (yellow card) 90'	Report	Brown (yellow card) 60'; Guzmán (yellow card) 64'	Stadium: Greater Nevada Field; Attendance: 6,001; Referee: Timothy Ford

September 23, 2017 29	Sacramento Republic FC	1–3	OKC Energy FC	Sacramento, California
9:30 PM CDT	Klimenta 59'	Report	Angulo 1'; Brown 9'; González 83'	Stadium: Papa Murphy's Park; Attendance: 11,659; Referee: Vincent Apple-Chiarella

October 1, 2017 30	OKC Energy FC	3–0	LA Galaxy II	Oklahoma City, Oklahoma
5:00 PM CDT	Angulo	Report		Stadium: Taft Stadium; Attendance: 4,609; Referee: Michael Radchuk

October 8, 2017 31	OKC Energy FC	4–1	Swope Park Rangers	Oklahoma City, Oklahoma
5:00 PM CDT	González 26'; Angulo 44', 90+4'; Wojcik (yellow card) 53'; Guzmán 64'; Fink (yellow card) 85'	Report	Maher (yellow card) 79'; Doyle 88'	Stadium: Taft Stadium; Attendance: 3,793; Referee: Malik Badawi

October 15, 2017 32	OKC Energy FC	3–1	Seattle Sounders FC 2	Oklahoma City, Oklahoma
5:00 PM CDT	Wallace (yellow card) 18'; Wojcik 43'; González 49'; Angulo 56'	Report	Narbón (yellow card) 39'; Hopeau 84'; Ele (yellow card) 88'	Stadium: Taft Stadium; Attendance: 4,851; Referee: Kevin Broadley

=== First round ===
October 21	Reno 1868 FC	0–1	OKC Energy FC	Reno, Nevada
7:45 PM CDT	Wehan (yellow card) 32'	Report	Wojcik 41', (yellow card) 90+1'	Stadium: Greater Nevada Field; Attendance: 4,342; Referee: Victor Rivas

=== Conference Semi-Finals ===
October 28	San Antonio FC	1–1 (a.e.t.) (1–4 p)	OKC Energy FC	San Antonio, Texas
7:30 PM CDT	Elizondo 7' (yellow card) 97'; Gordon (yellow card) 51'; Castillo (yellow card) 112'	Report	R. Dixon (yellow card) 72'; Wojcik 85'	Stadium: Toyota Field; Attendance: 7,032; Referee: Guido Gonzales Jr.
	Penalties
	Guzmán (penalty missed); Castillo (penalty scored); Reed (penalty missed)		(penalty scored) Angulo; (penalty scored) Brown; (penalty scored) Hyland; (penalty scored) Wallace

=== Conference Finals ===
November 4	Swope Park Rangers	0–0 (a.e.t.) (7-6 p)	OKC Energy FC	Kansas City, Kansas
7:30 PM CDT	Didic (yellow card) 53'		Barril (yellow card) 79'; Daly (yellow card) 90+3'; Wojcik (yellow card) 113'	Stadium: Children's Mercy Park; Attendance: 3,032; Referee: Robert Sibiga
	Penalties
	Selbol (penalty scored); Duke (penalty missed); Belmar (penalty scored); Moloto (penalty missed); Hernandez (penalty missed); Storm (penalty scored); Musa (penalty scored); Didic (penalty missed); Maher (penalty scored); Zendejas (penalty scored)		(penalty missed) Angulo; (penalty scored) Brown; (penalty missed) Hyland; (penalty missed) Wallace; (penalty scored) González; (penalty scored) González; (penalty scored) Wojcik; (penalty missed) Bond; (penalty scored) Fink; (penalty missed) Cochran

==== Standings ====
Pos	Team	Pld	W	D	L	GF	GA	GD	Pts	Qualification
1	Real Monarchs (X)	32	20	7	5	59	31	+28	67	Conference Playoffs
2	San Antonio FC	32	17	11	4	45	24	+21	62	Conference Playoffs
3	Reno 1868 FC	32	17	8	7	75	39	+36	59	Conference Playoffs
4	Swope Park Rangers	32	17	7	8	55	37	+18	58	Conference Playoffs
5	Phoenix Rising FC	32	17	7	8	50	37	+13	58	Conference Playoffs
6	OKC Energy FC	32	14	7	11	46	41	+5	49	Conference Playoffs
7	Tulsa Roughnecks	32	14	4	14	46	49	−3	46	Conference Playoffs
8	Sacramento Republic	32	13	7	12	45	43	+2	46	Conference Playoffs
9	Colorado Springs Switchbacks	32	12	8	12	55	51	+4	44	
10	Orange County SC	32	11	10	11	43	47	−4	43	
11	Rio Grande Valley Toros	32	9	8	15	37	50	−13	35	
12	Seattle Sounders 2	32	9	4	19	42	61	−19	31	
13	LA Galaxy II	32	8	5	19	32	64	−32	29	
14	Vancouver Whitecaps 2	32	5	9	18	32	52	−20	24	
15	Portland Timbers 2	32	3	6	23	27	63	−36	15	

Source: 2017 USL standings
Rules for classification: 1) total wins; 2) total goal differential; 3) total goals scored; 4) points earned against top four Conference finishers; 5) disciplinary points; 6) coin toss or drawing of lots
(X) Regular Season League Champion

=== U.S. Open Cup ===
OKC Energy FC will enter Open Cup in the Second Round.

May 17 Second round	OKC Energy FC (Oklahoma)	5–1	(California) Moreno Valley Fútbol Club	Norman, Oklahoma
7:00 PM CDT	Dixon 18', 69'; Wojcik 68'; González 73'; Craven 74'	Report	Gonzalez 8', (red card) 66'; García (yellow card) 24'; Rodríguez (yellow card) 35'; Rivera (yellow card) 67'; Castro (yellow card) 81' (yellow-red card) 84'	Stadium: John Crain Field; Attendance: 644; Referee: Jose Lara

May 31 Third round	Colorado Springs Switchbacks FC	1–2	(Oklahoma) OKC Energy FC	Colorado Springs, Colorado
8:00 PM CDT	Burt (yellow card) 28'; Cawsey (yellow card) 69'; Burt 90+1' (pen.)	Report	Barril 72'; Wojcik 83'; González (yellow card) 90+2'	Stadium: Weidner Field; Attendance: 1,222; Referee: Karen Abt

June 13 Fourth round	Colorado Rapids	3–2	(Oklahoma) OKC Energy FC	Commerce City, Colorado
8:00 PM CDT	Badji 49'; Miller 66'; Castillo (yellow card) 68', (goal) 89'; Powers (yellow card) 83'	Report	González 38'; Rasmussen 45+1'; Barril (yellow card) 77'; Wallace (yellow card) 90+2'	Stadium: Dick's Sporting Goods Park; Attendance: 1,222; Referee: Karen Abt

== Transfers ==
=== Loans in ===
Start date	End date	Position	No.	Player	From club
23 March 2017	4 November 2017	MF	21	(United States) Coy Craft	(United States) FC Dallas
11 July 2017	4 November 2017	MF	9	(Colombia) José Angulo	(United States) Saint Louis FC
