= Oklahoma City FC =

Oklahoma City FC may also refer to:

- Oklahoma City FC (NPSL), a soccer team that played in the National Premier Soccer League (NPSL).
- Oklahoma City FC (WPSL), a soccer team playing in the Women's Premier Soccer League (WPSL)
- Oklahoma City FC (NASL), a proposed soccer team in the North American Soccer League (NASL)
- OKC Energy FC, a soccer team playing in the United Soccer League (USL)
- Rayo OKC, a soccer team that played in the North American Soccer League (NASL)
