= Šašivarević =

Šašivarević is a surname. Notable people with the surname include:

- Amir Šašivarević (born 1994), German footballer
- Fuad Šašivarević (born 1968), Bosnian footballer
