= Taravel =

Taravel is a surname. Notable people with the surname include:

- Jérémy Taravel (born 1987), French footballer, brother of Nicolas
- Nicolas Taravel (born 1994), French footballer
