= Oklahoma City FC (NPSL) =

Soccer club in the United States

- Full name: Oklahoma City Football Club Premier
- Founded: 2012; 14 years ago
- Dissolved: 2014; 12 years ago
- Stadium: Oklahoma City University Stars Field
- Capacity: 5,000
- Owner(s): Sean Jones, Donna Clark and Tim McLaughlin
- Head Coach: Jimmy Hampton
- League: National Premier Soccer League
- 2013: 3rd, Mid South; Playoffs: DNQ
- Website: http://www.oklahomacityfc.com/
Home colors

Oklahoma City FC was a men's soccer team based in Oklahoma City, Oklahoma. They played in the National Premier Soccer League (NPSL). Founded in 2013, the team played in the USL Premier Development League in their first year before shifting to the NPSL. The organization also runs the Oklahoma City FC women's team in the Women's Premier Soccer League and the proposed Oklahoma City FC of the North American Soccer League (NASL). The team folded in 2014.

== History ==
=== USL Premier Development League ===
Oklahoma City was awarded a franchise team in the USL Premier Development League on February 14 (Valentine's Day), 2013. The ownership group included OKC Pro Soccer LLC (established by Oklahoma City businessman Tim McLaughlin) and Sold Out Strategies (managed by Oklahoma City native Brad Lund). This was where the team competed for one season in the Southern Conference as part of the Mid South Division. The team played their home games at Oklahoma City University's Stars Field. They finished 3rd in their division with an 8–4–2 record, missing the playoffs in their inaugural and only PDL season. They missed out on a playoff spot by three points.

=== National Premier Soccer League ===
Following their one season in the USL Premier Development League, the team moved to the National Premier Soccer League and they competed in the South Central Conference of the South Region in the 2014 NPSL season. The team played at Oklahoma City University Stars Field.

== Stadium ==
Amateur games in 2013 took place at Stars Field at Oklahoma City University. It was announced that for the 2015 season professional games would be played at Yukon's Miller Stadium and Academy games will be played at Oklahoma City's Casady School.

The club was exploring the possibility of building a riverfront 9,000–14,000 seat soccer-specific stadium in downtown Oklahoma City.

== Seasons ==
Year	Division	League	Regular season	Playoffs	Open Cup
2013	4	USL PDL	3rd, Mid South	Did not qualify	Did not qualify
2014	4	NPSL	2nd, South Central	Conference Semifinal	Did not qualify

== Players and staff ==
=== Most recent squad ===
As of January 25, 2014 Note: Flags indicate national team as defined under FIFA eligibility rules; some limited exceptions apply. Players may hold more than one non-FIFA nationality.

No.	Pos.	Nation	Player
0	GK	USA	Ray Clark
1	GK	USA	Bryan Byars
2	DF	USA	Tyler Ortlieb
3	DF	USA	Nathan Doll
4	DF	ENG	Danny Frid
5	DF	ENG	Scott Parkinson
6	DF	ENG	Chris Spendlove
7	MF	SCO	Niall Crick
8	DF	USA	Chris Taylor
9	FW	USA	Tommy Hubbard
10	FW	ENG	Adam Black
11	FW	GHA	Stephen Owusu
12	DF	ENG	Phil Pryor
—	MF	USA	Luis Lemus
13	MF	SCO	Danny Gibson
14	MF	NZL	Thomas Leabourn-Boss

No.	Pos.	Nation	Player
15	DF	USA	Austin Place
16	MF	ENG	Kal Okot
17	FW	FRA	Nicolas Alberto
18	MF	USA	Troy Tippeconnic
19	FW	USA	James Gross
20	MF	USA	Matt Bray
21	MF	SCO	Liam Madden
22	DF	USA	Kevin Cabello
23	FW	KEN	David Otieno
24	DF	ENG	Andrew Webster
25	FW	ENG	Jake Cottage
—	FW	USA	Anthony Buchanan
26	MF	USA	Willy Deleon
27	FW	USA	Matthew Giudice II
28	FW	USA	Jaccob Rangel
29	MF	ENG	Adam Kay

=== Team management ===
- Jimmy Hampton – Head Coach
- Toni Orsi – Assistant Coach
- Danny Gibson – Assistant Coach

== North American Soccer League ==
Oklahoma City FC
- Founded: 2013
- Dissolved: 2015
- Stadium: Miller Stadium
- Capacity: 6,000
- Owner: Sold Out Strategies
- League: North American Soccer League
- Website: http://www.oklahomacityfc.com/

The ownership group of Oklahoma City FC, OKC Pro Soccer LLC and Sold Out Strategies, was also approved to field a professional team in the North American Soccer League (NASL) – Division II in the American soccer pyramid – beginning with the 2015 season. It was also to be called the Oklahoma City FC.

Oklahoma City FC initially intended to pursue a franchise in the United Soccer Leagues' Professional Division (USL Pro) in 2013. The USL, however, also received an expansion franchise bid from a competing group, managed by another Oklahoma City-based sports group, Prodigal, LLC. With Prodigal, LLC's impending bid before the Division III USL Pro, Oklahoma City FC instead concentrated on obtaining an expansion franchise in the Division II NASL in April 2013. Oklahoma City FC's organizational plans met with some initial success on June 17, 2013, by obtaining the rights to lease Oklahoma City's Taft Stadium (a venue for which the Prodigal group also bid).

The USL, however, considered Oklahoma City FC's attempt to start an NASL franchise to be a breach of its non-compete agreement with the USL's Premier Development League, and issued a cease and desist letter against Oklahoma City FC. Oklahoma City FC's owners subsequently filed a lawsuit against the USL on June 28, 2013, seeking a declaration that the non-compete clause is unenforceable. The litigation is currently pending.

USL Pro awarded its expansion franchise to the Prodigal group on July 2, 2013. Shortly thereafter, the NASL awarded an expansion franchise to Sold Out Strategies on July 25, 2013. Sold Out Strategies announced on April 7, 2014, that its NASL team would be named Oklahoma City FC – the same as its affiliated amateur franchises – and unveiled a new team crest and kit. Oklahoma City FC was slated to join the NASL in 2015, which led the amateur team to also switch leagues to the National Premier Soccer League.

Prodigal announced its franchise branding as the Oklahoma City Energy in November 2013. This gave Oklahoma City two approved franchises for future play: USL Pro's Energy starting in 2014, and NASL's Oklahoma City FC starting in 2015.

In March 2014, one of the partners in Oklahoma City FC, Tim McLaughlin of OKC Pro Soccer LLC, bought a 50% ownership stake in the rival franchise. Reportedly, McLaughlin controlled the lease rights to Taft Stadium, and the Energy therefore announced its intention to move to Taft Stadium for the 2015 season after its inaugural 2014 season at Bishop McGuinness High School's Pribil Stadium. Remaining owner Brad Lund of Sold Out Strategies indicated that this development "does not impact Oklahoma City FC’s or the NASL’s future in OKC."

In an interview published on August 10, 2015, NASL Commissioner Bill Peterson told the Telegraph that the league had moved on from the Oklahoma City franchise. On August 21, 2015, ESPN's Dermot Corrigan reported that La Liga, the first division in Spain, had given approval for one of their teams to purchase stock in Oklahoma City FC. La Liga team Rayo Vallecano has expressed interest in purchasing majority stock in NASL Oklahoma City FC. On November 10, 2015, the NASL announced that a new club called Rayo OKC would begin play in the 2016 season. The new team was majority-owned by Raúl Martín Presa, the owner of Rayo Vallecano then of La Liga, with a minority stake owned by Oklahoma native Sean Jones. Rayo OKC was managed by the former owners of Oklahoma City FC franchise, Sold Out Strategies. However, Rayo OKC would only last one season in the NASL.
