= Christian Eissele =

American soccer player (born 1992)

Personal information
- Date of birth: June 23, 1992 (age 34)
- Place of birth: Orlando, Florida, United States
- Height: 1.88 m (6 ft 2 in)
- Position: Striker

Youth career
- RIASA

Senior career*
Years	Team	Apps	(Gls)
2012–2014	PS Kemi	52	(44)
2014–2015	IK Brage	39	(15)
2015–2016	PS Kemi	37	(8)
2017	FF Jaro	27	(11)
2018	Sacramento Republic	25	(5)
2019	Oklahoma City Energy	29	(5)
Total		209	(88)

Managerial career
- 2020–: Lake Mary Rams
- * Club domestic league appearances and goals

Christian Eissele (born June 23, 1992) is an American former professional soccer player who played as a striker. He is currently head coach at Lake Mary High School in Florida.

== Early life ==
Eissele was born in Orlando, Florida. His father, Bill, works as a high school drama teacher and football coach. His mother, Susan, plays the piano for a local church. Eissele also has a sister who works as a lieutenant who is stationed in Valdosta, Georgia. At a young age, Eissele had a keen interest in tennis however football was, with the help of his tennis coach Steve, his chosen sport.

He left the United States to go to Europe in order of finding a professional contract. He first travelled to Leeds, England to join the Richmond University International Academic & Soccer Academy. Despite developing at the academy, Eissele's hopes of playing professionally were stopped due to the American not being eligible for a work permit. In March 2012, he landed a trial at Finnish club PS Kemi and subsequently received a professional contract which he signed at the age of 19.

== Career ==
=== PS Kemi ===
Eissele made his PS Kemi debut on April 29, 2012, in a 0–2 home defeat to KPV. He scored his first professional goal against YPA on 12 May, scoring a penalty to draw the match level at 1–1 and PS Kemi went on to win 3–1. After scoring goals in matches against Santa Claus and, again, YPA, Eissele scored his first career hat-trick in a 5–0 home victory against HauPa, with all three goals coming within 16 minutes.

Eissele wasn't done there though, as little over three weeks later he scored five goals in one match against Warkaus. The match ended 8–0 in Kemi's favour. Warkaus' results from that season were cancelled in August 2012 due to Warkaus not turning up to a Kakkonen fixture against TP-47 and therefore were kicked out of the league, but the Football Association of Finland decided that statistics from all matches involving Warkaus would still stand. In the club's final Kakkonen fixture, Eissele scored another hat-trick in a 3–1 win versus Kajaani.

The following season, 2013, went just as good for Eissele with the forward scoring seven goals between April and May. However, June was Eissele's standout month as he scored ten goals in five matches, including two hat-tricks and two braces. The hat-tricks came against ORPa and Tervarit while the braces were scored against KPV, the team he played on his professional debut, and GBK Kokkola. Eissele scored seven more goals, including another hat-trick (versus KPV), in the remainder of 2013.

At the start of 2014, Eissele had trials at two Veikkausliiga clubs. In February, he spent time with RoPS and featured in a Finnish League Cup tie against Honka in which he played 62 minutes without scoring. Around two months later, in March, Eissele had a trial at KuPS and again played as a trialist in a League Cup tie. He participated in the full match versus SJK but didn't score.

He left Kemi on March 29, 2014.

=== IK Brage ===
On 29 March 2014, Eissele moved to Sweden to join IK Brage, signing a three-year contract. He made his first appearance for Brage on 21 April 2014 in a 2–1 win versus AFC United, he played 90 minutes before being substituted for Viktor Ekervik-Eriksson. It took Eissele eight matches to score his first goal for the club when he scored a 54th-minute equaliser against Umeå. Around a month later Eissele scored two goals in a 1–3 win away to Valsta Syrianska, but again didn't score for another month. However, he then scored in five consecutive matches in August and September which included a hat-trick in the final of those five matches against Huddinge. He scored once more in the 2014 season when he scored an equaliser against Valsta Syrianska to earn a draw for Brage on 19 October.

2015 was less successful for Eissele at Brage as he scored just four goals in thirteen matches, but did get two of those goals in his penultimate appearance for the club on 28 June versus Nyköping. His last match for Brage was against Carlstad United 5 July. He left the club on 28 July.

=== Return to PS Kemi ===
After his release from Brage, Eissele returned to Finland to sign for former club PS Kemi. He made his second debut for Kemi against VIFK, he scored two goals to complete a comeback win for the club. He then scored in the following fixture versus Jazz which ended 0–4. He scored three future goals in August and September to continue his fine return to Kemi. In total in 2015, Eissele scored seven goals in eleven appearances which helped Kemi win the Ykkönen and gain promotion to the Veikkausliiga for 2016. He made his Veikkausliiga debut on April 9, 2016, in a 3–0 home win against reigning champions SJK. He scored his first Veikkausliiga goal on August 13 versus Inter Turku.

=== FF Jaro ===
On February 14, 2017, Eissele joined Ykkönen side FF Jaro. He made his debut on February 17 in a Finnish Cup tie against Kerho 07 and scored four goals in a 1–8 away win.

=== Sacramento Republic ===
On January 17, 2018, Eissele signed with United Soccer League side Sacramento Republic. Five goals, notably two against Seattle Sounders FC 2 on 8 September, in twenty-seven matches followed as Sacramento reached the post-season play-offs; where they lost to Swope Park Rangers. He was released by the club on 30 November. Subsequently, in December, Eissele rejoined former club FF Jaro on trial.

=== Oklahoma City Energy ===
Eissele returned to the USL Championship on January 16, 2019, signing with Oklahoma City Energy. He was released in December, having scored seven goals in thirty-two matches across all competitions.

=== Retirement ===
Eissele announced his retirement on April 6, 2020, subsequently taking over from his father as Lake Mary High School's girls soccer head coach in August. He also set-up a training business for local footballers in the Orlando, Florida area.

== Career statistics ==
Appearances and goals by club, season and competition.
Club	Season	League			National Cup		League Cup		Continental		Other		Total	
Club	Season	Division	Apps	Goals	Apps	Goals	Apps	Goals	Apps	Goals	Apps	Goals	Apps	Goals
PS Kemi	2012	Kakkonen	26	20	0	0	–		–		0	0	26	20
PS Kemi	2013	Kakkonen	26	24	1	0	–		–		0	0	27	24
PS Kemi	Total		52	44	1	0	–		–		0	0	53	44
IK Brage	2014	Division 1	26	11	0	0	–		–		0	0	26	11
IK Brage	2015	Division 1	13	4	0	0	–		–		0	0	13	4
IK Brage	Total		39	15	0	0	–		–		0	0	39	15
PS Kemi	2015	Ykkönen	11	7	0	0	–		–		0	0	11	7
PS Kemi	2016	Veikkausliiga	26	1	0	0	2	1	–		0	0	28	2
PS Kemi	Total		37	8	0	0	2	1	–		0	0	39	9
FF Jaro	2017	Ykkönen	27	11	3	7	–		–		0	0	30	18
Sacramento Republic	2018	United Soccer League	25	5	1	0	–		–		1 (Note: Appearance(s) in USL Cup)	0	27	5
Oklahoma City Energy	2019	USL Championship	29	5	3	2	–		–		0	0	32	7
Career total			209	88	8	9	2	1	–		1	0	222	98

== Honors ==
PS Kemi

- Ykkönen: 2015
