= Daniel Gonzalez (soccer, born 1992) =

American soccer player

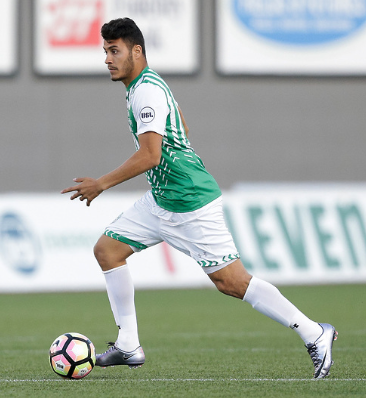
- Energy FC midfielder Daniel Gonzalez

Personal information
- Date of birth: July 12, 1992 (age 34)
- Place of birth: Yelm, Washington, United States
- Height: 1.80 m (5 ft 11 in)
- Position: Midfielder

Youth career
- 2012–2013: Peninsula College Pirates

Senior career*
Years	Team	Apps	(Gls)
2014	Kitsap Pumas	4	(0)
2015–2017	Oklahoma City Energy	73	(6)
- * Club domestic league appearances and goals as of 12:55, 21 October 2017 (UTC)

Daniel Gonzalez (born July 12, 1992) is an American professional soccer player who plays as a midfielder.

== Career ==
=== College & Youth ===
Gonzalez played two years college soccer at Peninsula College between 2012 and 2013.

Gonzalez played with USL PDL club Kitsap Pumas in 2014.

=== Professional ===
Gonzalez signed with United Soccer League club Oklahoma City Energy on January 28, 2015.

=== Personal ===
Daniel's brother, Miguel, also plays for the Energy.
