= Zachary Ellis-Hayden =

Barbadian footballer (born 1992)

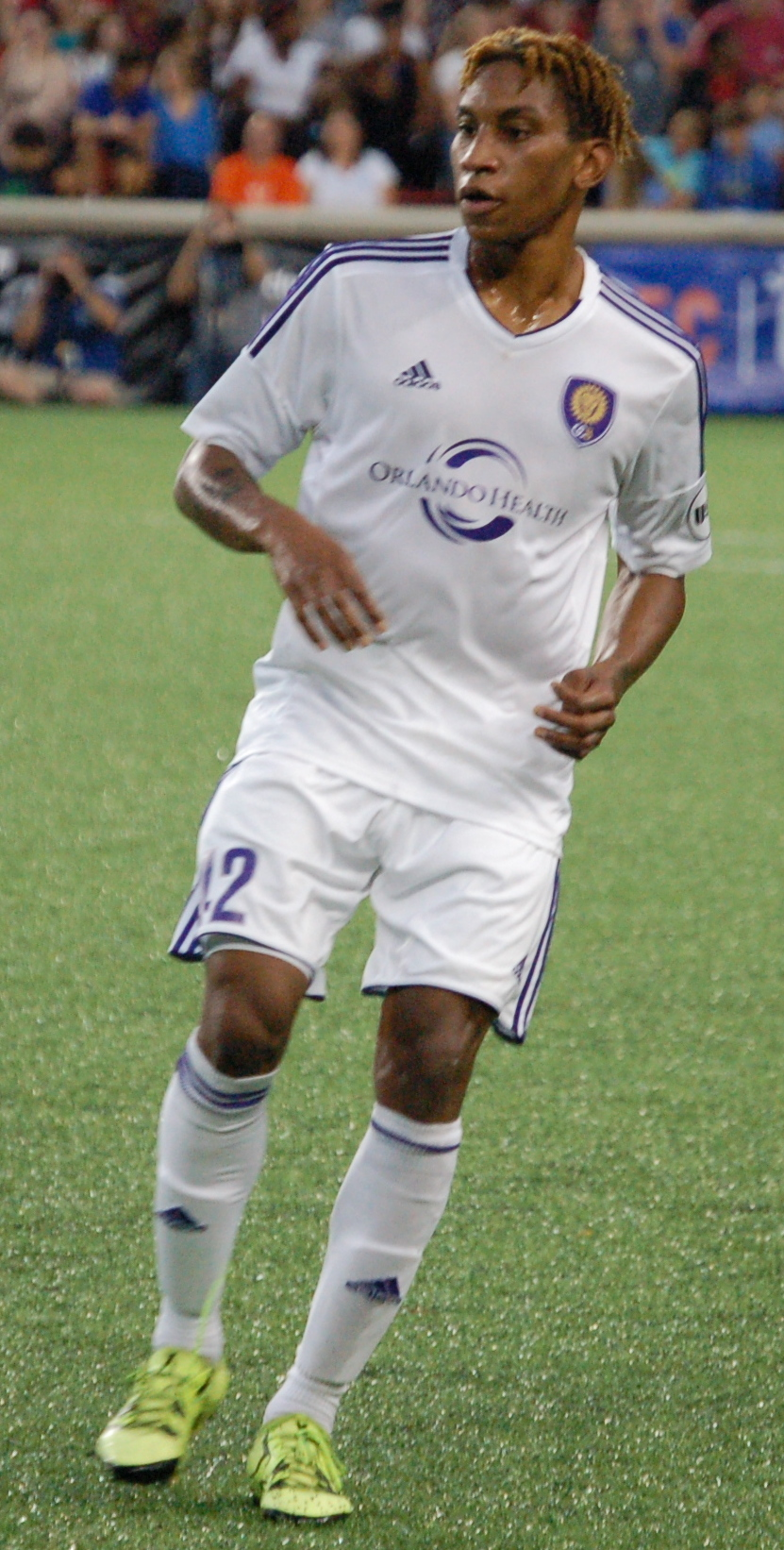
- Ellis-Hayden playing for Orlando City B in 2016

Personal information
- Date of birth: March 1, 1992 (age 34)
- Place of birth: Kitchener, Ontario, Canada
- Height: 5 ft 8 in (1.73 m)
- Position: Defender

Youth career
- Kitchener SC
- Waterloo United

College career
Years	Team	Apps	(Gls)
2010–2013	Cleveland State Vikings	78	(6)

Senior career*
Years	Team	Apps	(Gls)
2015	K-W United	11	(0)
2015	SC Waterloo B		
2015	SC Waterloo Region		
2016–2017	Orlando City B	44	(1)
2018–2019	Fresno FC	50	(2)
2020–2021	OKC Energy FC	37	(1)
2022	Electric City FC	16	(0)
2023	Guelph United FC	14	(0)
2024–	Waterloo United (Note: BVB IA Waterloo changed its name to Waterloo United in 2025)	26	(4)

International career^{‡}
2023	Barbados	6	(0)
- * Club domestic league appearances and goals as of August 27, 2025 ‡ National team caps and goals as of November 20, 2023

Zachary Ellis-Hayden (born March 1, 1992) is a professional footballer who plays as a defender who plays for Waterloo United in the League1 Ontario Championship. Born in Canada, he represented Barbados at international level.

== Early life ==
Ellis-Hayden attended Forest Heights Collegiate Institute, where he was recognized as the team MVP in 2009 and 2010 and was named MVP of the Waterloo Region High School League in 2010.

He played youth soccer with Kitchener SC and Waterloo United, later moving to a club in London, Ontario at the OYSL level.

== College career ==
In 2010, he began attending Cleveland State University, where he played for the men's soccer team. In November 2010, he was named to the CollegeSoccerNews.com National Team of the Week. On October 1, 2011, he scored his first collegiate goal in a 3-2 victory over the Milwaukee Panthers. In 2012, he helped them win the Horizon League title and was named to the All-Horizon League Second Team and the All-Great Lakes Region Third Team. In 2013, he was named to the All-Horizon League First Team.

== Club career ==
In 2015, Ellis-Hayden played with K-W United FC in the Premier Development League, with whom he won the league title. For the remainder of the season, he played in the Canadian Soccer League Second Division with SC Waterloo B. He also managed to play with Waterloo's senior team in the First Division and was featured in the CSL Championship final against Toronto Croatia.

In February 2016, he signed with Orlando City B in the USL. In November 2016, he re-signed with the club for the 2017 season. On June 3, 2017, he scored his first professional goal in a 2-1 victory over the Pittsburgh Riverhounds. After the 2017 season, Orlando City B announced they would not pick up Ellis Hayden's option for the following season.

In December 2017, he signed with expansion club Fresno FC. He subsequently returned to the club for the 2019 season.

In December 2019, he joined OKC Energy FC in the USL Championship. In 2020, he was named the club's player of the year. On September 12, 2021, he scored his first goal for the club in a 1-1 draw against Louisville City FC.

In February 2022, he joined League1 Ontario expansion club Electric City FC on a transfer as the club's first ever signing. He was named a league Third Team All-Star in 2022.

In March 2023, he signed with Guelph United FC. In December 2023, he announced his retirement from the sport.

However, in 2024, he began playing with BVB IA Waterloo (later Waterloo United) in the League1 Ontario Championship.

== International career ==
Born in Canada, Ellis-Hayden accepted a call-up to Barbados in May 2022 ahead of their CONCACAF Nations League matches against Antigua and Barbuda, Cuba and Guadeloupe. However, he suffered an injury in training ahead of the matches and departed the squad. He eventually made his debut in March 2023, in a CONCACAF Nations League match against Cuba. He later played an addition five matches, with his final match coming on November 20, 2023, against Montserrat.

== Personal life ==
Ellis-Hayden is the brother of Jonathan Henry-Hayden, who played in the English lower divisions for five years and the cousin of Jake Inglis, who played professionally in Scotland.

== Career statistics ==
As of match played August 27, 2025

Appearances and goals by club, season and competition
Club	Season	League			Playoffs		National cup		Other		Total	
Club	Season	Division	Apps	Goals	Apps	Goals	Apps	Goals	Apps	Goals	Apps	Goals
Orlando City B	2016	USL	20	0	1	0	—		—		21	0
Orlando City B	2017	USL	24	1	—		—		—		24	1
Orlando City B	Total		44	1	1	0	0	0	0	0	45	1
Fresno FC	2018	USL	20	2	—		1	0	—		21	2
Fresno FC	2019	USL Championship	30	0	1	0	2	0	—		33	0
Fresno FC	Total		50	2	1	0	3	0	0	0	54	2
OKC Energy FC	2020	USL Championship	15	0	—		—		—		15	0
OKC Energy FC	2021	USL Championship	22	1	—		—		—		22	1
OKC Energy FC	Total		37	1	0	0	0	0	0	0	37	1
Electric City FC	2022	League1 Ontario	16	0	—		—		—		16	0
Guelph United FC	2023	League1 Ontario	14	0	1	0	—		—		15	0
Waterloo United	2024	League1 Ontario Championship	10	1	—		—		2	0	12	1
Waterloo United	2025	League1 Ontario Championship	16	3	—		—		0	0	16	3
Waterloo United	Total		26	4	0	0	0	0	2	0	28	4
Career total			187	8	3	0	3	0	2	0	195	8

== Honours ==
SC Waterloo Region

- CSL Championship runner-up: 2015
