= Luis Martínez (footballer, born 1990) =

Mexican footballer

Personal information
- Date of birth: February 9, 1990 (age 36)
- Place of birth: Barra de Navidad, Jalisco, Mexico
- Height: 1.68 m (5 ft 6 in)
- Position: Midfielder

College career
Years	Team	Apps	(Gls)
2009–2013	Chico State Wildcats		

Senior career*
Years	Team	Apps	(Gls)
2014	San Jose Earthquakes U23	9	(4)
2014–2015	AD Guanacasteca		
2015	FC Tucson	13	(4)
2016–2017	Oklahoma City Energy	17	(0)
2019	FC Tucson	2	(0)
- * Club domestic league appearances and goals as of 21 September 2021

Luis Martínez (born February 9, 1990) is a Mexican footballer who last played for FC Tucson in USL League One.

== Career ==
Martínez played four years college soccer at Chico State University between 2009 and 2013, although red-shirted the entire 2011 year.

After college, Martínez played with Premier Development League side San Jose Earthquakes U23, before moving to Costa Rican second division side AD Guanacasteca for 6-months.

Martínez returned to the PDL with FC Tucson in 2015.

On December 15, 2015, Martínez signed with United Soccer League side Oklahoma City Energy.
