= Bryan Byars =

American soccer player

Personal information
- Full name: Bryan Byars
- Date of birth: October 2, 1991 (age 35)
- Place of birth: Oklahoma City, Oklahoma, United States
- Height: 1.88 m (6 ft 2 in)
- Position: Goalkeeper

Youth career
- 2007–2010: Putnam City North Panthers

College career
Years	Team	Apps	(Gls)
2010	Midwestern State Mustangs		
2011–2013	USAO Drovers		

Senior career*
Years	Team	Apps	(Gls)
2014	Oklahoma City FC		
2015	Oklahoma City Energy	0	(0)
2016	Rayo OKC	2	(0)
2017	Tulsa Roughnecks	7	(0)
2018–2019	Oklahoma City Energy	10	(0)
2020	FC Tulsa	0	(0)

Managerial career
- 2014: Chickasha Fightin' Chicks (assistant)
- 2015: Chickasha Fightin' Chicks
- 2017: Rogers State Hillcats (women's assistant)
- * Club domestic league appearances and goals as of October 6, 2020

Bryan Byars (born October 2, 1991) is an American soccer player who currently plays as goalkeeper.

== Youth career ==
At Putnam City North High School, Byars was named All-America and All-State his senior year. He was also named All-District from his sophomore year to his senior year. In 2008, Byars was a Gatorade National Player of the Year nominee. He was also named Oklahoma State Player Of The Year as a sophomore. In 2007, as a freshman, he helped lead the Panthers to the state championship game, losing in penalty kicks. During the middle of Byars' senior season the Panthers were the top ranked team in the nation.

Byars attended Midwestern State University in 2010 and redshirted his freshman year.

In 2011, Byars transferred to University of Science and Arts of Oklahoma. Coming in as a redshirt freshman, Byars started his first year for the Drovers, allowing just 16 goals while collecting 67 saves. For the season Byars earned 17 wins and 10 shutouts. He also earned SAC All-Conference First Team honors. Byars spent 4 years at USAO, achieving the school records for career wins (46) and shutouts (31).

== Senior career ==
In 2014, Byars, along with several other former Oklahoma high school standouts were named to the roster of newly established Oklahoma City FC of the NPSL, playing for his former USAO coach, Jimmy Hampton. Oklahoma City FC were liquidated in late 2014.

In 2015, Byars signed a contract with the Oklahoma City Energy of the USL, where he reunited with fellow USAO, Midwestern State, and Oklahoma City FC goalkeeper, Jennings Clark.

In 2016, Byars and fellow former Oklahoma City standout Adrian Ables, were signed to the new NASL team, Rayo OKC. He made his professional debut for Rayo OKC in late 2016 due to starting goalkeeper Daniel Fernandes being injured. Rayo OKC dissolved in early 2017.

In 2017, Byars tried out with the Tulsa Roughnecks and was signed to a contract shortly after.

In 2018, Byars returned to Oklahoma City Energy and was signed to a contract for the 2018 season. He was nominated for USL Save of the Week in weeks 17, 18, and 26 of the USL season.

Byars returned to Tulsa's USL Championship team, now FC Tulsa, in January 2020.

== Coaching ==
Byars also serves as goalkeeper coach at his alma mater Putnam City North High School for the boys and girls team, along with Oklahoma FC, a local youth club team. Byars coaching career also includes a stint at Chickasha High School that boasts an undefeated district championship as a head coach in 2015.

Byars joined the staff of Rogers State Hillcats women's soccer coach Scott Parkinson in 2017. The two had previously coached together at Chickasha High School.

As of January 2023, Byars coaches with the Edmond SC youth organization.
