= Christian Ibeagha =

Nigerian-born American soccer player

Personal information
- Full name: Christian Ogochukwu Ibeagha
- Date of birth: January 10, 1990 (age 36)
- Place of birth: Port Harcourt, Nigeria
- Height: 1.87 m (6 ft 2 in)
- Position: Defender

Youth career
- 2006–2007: IMG Soccer Academy

College career
Years	Team	Apps	(Gls)
2007–2010	Duke Blue Devils		

Senior career*
Years	Team	Apps	(Gls)
2008	Bradenton Academics	12	(1)
2009	Cary Clarets	13	(1)
2011–2012	Carolina Dynamo	9	(1)
2012	Puerto Rico Islanders	6	(0)
2013–2015	Bohemians 1905	0	(0)
2015	→ FC Suðuroy (loan)	24	(1)
2016	Colorado Springs Switchbacks	29	(0)
2017	North Carolina FC	28	(2)
2018–2020	Oklahoma City Energy	72	(3)

International career^{‡}
2006	United States U17	1	(0)
- * Club domestic league appearances and goals as of October 6, 2020 ‡ National team caps and goals as of August 23, 2012

Christian Ogochukwu Ibeagha (born January 10, 1990) is a Nigerian-born American soccer player.

== Career ==
=== Youth, college and amateur ===
Ibeagha attended Deer Creek High School in Edmond, Oklahoma and spent his entire college career at Duke University. Prior to Duke, he was a Two-time NSCAA Youth All-America selection and a member of the U.S. soccer residency program in 2006 and 2007.

In his freshman year, Ibeagha was named to the All-ACC Freshman team after making 16 appearances for Duke in 2007. In 2008, he made 20 appearances and recorded an assist. He was also ranked fourth in the team in minutes played with 1,513. In his junior year, Ibeagha was named to the NSCAA All-South Region third team after making 20 appearances and finishing with a goal and an assist. In his senior season, Ibeagha started the first five games of the season before suffering a season-ending injury.

During his time in College, Ibeagha also played in the USL Premier Development League, spending the 2008 season with Bradenton Academics and the 2009 season with Cary Clarets. He also spent two seasons with Carolina Dynamo after failing to sign with a professional club.

=== Professional ===
On July 26, 2012, Ibeagha signed his first professional contract, joining NASL club Puerto Rico Islanders. About a week later, Ibeagha made his professional debut in a 2–1 victory over San Antonio Scorpions FC.

Ibeagha signed with Bohemians 1905 in the Czech Republic in October 2013.

In February 2015 he signed with the Faroese club FC Suðuroy on loan. After his release from Bohemians, Ibeagha joined United Soccer League side Colorado Springs Switchbacks.

On March 3, 2017, Ibeagha signed with NASL side North Carolina FC.

On January 15, 2018, Ibeagha signed with USL side Oklahoma City Energy.

== Personal ==
Christian's brother, Sebastien Ibeagha, currently plays for Los Angeles FC.
