= Scott Parkinson =

English footballer and manager

- Parkinson with the Seattle Reign in 2026

Personal information
- Date of birth: 27 November 1983 (age 42)
- Position: Defender

Team information
- Current team: Seattle Reign FC (assistant)

College career
Years	Team	Apps	(Gls)
2010–2013	USAO Drovers	78	(16)

Senior career*
Years	Team	Apps	(Gls)
2011	Reading United AC		
2013	Oklahoma City FC		

Managerial career
- 2012–2014: Chickasha Fightin' Chicks (men)
- 2014: OKWU Eagles (men) (assistant)
- 2014–2015: Rogers State Hillcats (men) (assistant)
- 2016–2017: Rogers State Hillcats (women)
- 2018–2019: Utah Royals FC (assistant)
- 2020: Utah Royals FC (interim)
- 2020–2021: Chicago Red Stars (assistant)
- 2021–2022: NJ/NY Gotham FC
- 2023–: Seattle Reign FC (assistant)
- * Club domestic league appearances and goals

Scott Parkinson (born 27 November 1983) is an English football manager and former player who played as a defender. He is currently the head assistant coach for Seattle Reign FC of the American National Women's Soccer League (NWSL).

== College career ==
Parkinson was an All-American player for the USAO Drovers men's soccer team.

== Club career ==
Parkinson captained Oklahoma City FC during their inaugural season in 2013.

== Managerial career ==
Parkinson joined the professional ranks in 2018 as an assistant coach for the NWSL expansion team Utah Royals FC. He left for the same position at Chicago Red Stars in 2020.

On 31 August 2021, Parkinson was named the head coach of NWSL team NJ/NY Gotham FC through 2022. On 11 August 2022, after a 4–8–0 start of the 2022 NWSL regular season, Gotham FC announced that the club and Parkinson had "parted ways" and would seek a new coach for the 2023 season.

== Career statistics ==
=== Managerial ===
As of August 11, 2022

Managerial record by team and tenure
Team	From	To	Record				
Team	From	To	P	W	D	L	Win %
NJ/NY Gotham FC	31 August 2021	11 August 2022	27	8	8	11	29.63

== Personal life ==
Parkinson is from Liverpool, and attended Wade Deacon High School.
