= Kal Okot =

English footballer

Personal information
- Full name: Kalokwera Okot
- Date of birth: 8 October 1990 (age 36)
- Place of birth: London, England
- Height: 1.83 m (6 ft 0 in)
- Position: Midfielder

College career
| Years | Team | Apps | (Gls) |
| 2011–2014 | USAO Drovers | 79 | (11) |

Senior career*
| Years | Team | Apps | (Gls) |
| 2014 | Oklahoma City FC | 10 | (2) |
| 2015 | Forest City London | 13 | (3) |
| 2016 | OKC Energy U23 | 1 | (0) |
| 2018 | OKC Energy U23 | 16 | (4) |
| 2019 | Oklahoma City Energy | 40 | (0) |
| 2021-2022 | OKC 1889 | 14 | (0) |

Managerial career
- 2022-: Bishop McGuinness Irish (Women)
- * Club domestic league appearances and goals as of 6 July 2022

Kalokwera "Kal" Okot (born 8 October 1990) is an English professional footballer who plays as a midfielder.

== Career ==
=== Professional career ===
Okot signed his first professional contract at the age of 28, joining USL Championship side Oklahoma City Energy on 4 February 2019.

=== Managerial career ===
Okot started gaining coaching experience as an assistant from local high schools like Chickasha while he was attending USAO and Mustang after he graduated from college. He also was a coach for local Energy FC academy teams. His first high school head coach position came at Bishop McGuinness where he won the 2022 5a state championship.
