= Joe Amico =

American professional soccer player

Personal information
- Full name: Joseph Amico
- Date of birth: April 17, 1995 (age 31)
- Place of birth: Indianapolis, Indiana, US
- Height: 1.83 m (6 ft 0 in)
- Position: Defender

Youth career
- 2012–2013: Sporting Kansas City

College career
Years	Team	Apps	(Gls)
2013	UCF Knights	19	(0)
2014–2016	Jacksonville Dolphins	50	(1)

Senior career*
Years	Team	Apps	(Gls)
2015	Jacksonville United		
2016	Des Moines Menace	0	(0)
2017	Swope Park Rangers	2	(0)
2018–2019	Orange County SC	53	(1)
2020	Oklahoma City Energy	11	(0)
Total		66+	(1+)
- * Club domestic league appearances and goals as of April 22, 2022

Joseph Amico (born April 17, 1995) is an American former professional soccer player who played as a defender.

== Career ==
=== College and youth ===
Amico played four years of college soccer, beginning as a freshman at the University of Central Florida, before transferring to Jacksonville University for their 2014 season onward. In 2016, Amico played with Premier Development League side Des Moines Menace without making an appearance.

=== Professional ===
On January 18, 2017, Amico signed with United Soccer League side Swope Park Rangers.

On February 16, 2018, Amico signed with Orange County SC for the 2018 season.

Amico moved to USL Championship side Oklahoma City Energy on January 7, 2020.
