= Miguel González (footballer, born 1990) =

Mexican footballer

Personal information
- Date of birth: 1 October 1990 (age 36)
- Place of birth: Michoacán, Mexico
- Height: 1.68 m (5 ft 6 in)
- Position: Forward

Youth career
- 2006–2009: Yelm Tornados

College career
Years	Team	Apps	(Gls)
2010–2011	Peninsula Pirates		(49)
2012–2013	Seattle Redhawks	41	(19)

Senior career*
Years	Team	Apps	(Gls)
2013	Seattle Sounders U-23	1	(0)
2014	Kitsap Pumas	10	(6)
2015–2016	Colorado Springs Switchbacks	53	(16)
2017–2018	Oklahoma City Energy	42	(9)
2019–2020	Miami FC	31	(21)
- * Club domestic league appearances and goals as of October 4, 2020

Miguel González (born October 1, 1990) is a Mexican footballer who currently plays as a forward.

== Career ==
=== College & Youth ===
González began playing college soccer at Peninsula College in 2010, before moving to Seattle University in 2012. He was named WAC Offensive Player of the Year and First Team All-WAC in 2013.

While at college in Seattle, González appeared once for USL PDL club Seattle Sounders U-23 in 2013.

After college, González trialled with Seattle Sounders FC, before signing with PDL side Kitsap Pumas.

=== Colorado Springs Switchbacks FC ===
González signed with USL club Colorado Springs Switchbacks on January 27, 2015.

González ended his first season with the Switchbacks with 10 goals and 7 assists.

On December 9, 2015, it was announced that González will rejoin the Switchbacks for the 2016 United Soccer League season. On March 12, 2016, González scored 1 and assisted 1 in a 3-2 preseason victory against UCCS. Gonzalez scored in the Switchbacks opening game victory of the 2016 USL season, against OKC Energy. His performance earned him a spot on the first 2016 USL Team of the Week.

=== Oklahoma City Energy FC ===
On December 6, 2016, González signed with Oklahoma City Energy FC, also of the USL. His brother, Daniel, had played for the Energy the season before and had re-signed with the club a few weeks before. He scored his first goal on April 11, scoring a very impressive bicycle kick.

=== Miami FC ===
González joined Miami FC of the National Premier Soccer League on February 4, 2019.

== Personal life ==
González's brother, Daniel, also played for Oklahoma City Energy.

In December 2023, González joined Oly Town FC as their Director of Player Development.

== Career statistics ==
As of match played October 4, 2020

Club	Season	League			Cup (Note: Appearances in U.S. Open Cup)		Other		Total	
Club	Season	Division	Apps	Goals	Apps	Goals	Apps	Goals	Apps	Goals
Colorado Springs Switchbacks FC	2015	USL	26	10	2	0	1	1	29	11
Colorado Springs Switchbacks FC	2016	USL	27	6	1	0	1	0	29	6
Colorado Springs Switchbacks FC	Total		53	16	3	0	2	1	58	17
OKC Energy FC	2017	USL	29	8	2	1	3	0	34	9
OKC Energy FC	2018	USL	13	1	1	1	0	0	14	2
OKC Energy FC	Total		42	9	3	2	3	0	48	11
Miami FC	2019	NPSL	10	13	1	0	6	3	17	16
Miami FC	2019	NISA	5	4	-	-	1	1	6	5
Miami FC	2020	USL Championship	16	4	0	0	0	0	16	4
Miami FC	Total		31	21	1	0	7	4	39	25
Career total			124	46	7	2	12	5	143	53
