= Josh García =

American-Dominican footballer

Personal information
- Full name: Joshua García
- Date of birth: July 28, 1993 (age 33)
- Place of birth: Massachusetts, United States
- Height: 1.73 m (5 ft 8 in)
- Position: Midfielder

Youth career
- 2007–2011: Grant High School

College career
Years	Team	Apps	(Gls)
2011–2013	Northern Oklahoma College	27	(1)
2013–2016	Friends Falcons	8	(1)

Senior career*
Years	Team	Apps	(Gls)
2018–2019	Oklahoma City Energy U23	11	(2)
2019	Oklahoma City Energy	1	(0)
2021	Club Atlético de San Francisco	10	(2)

International career^{‡}
2019–	Dominican Republic	2	(1)
- * Club domestic league appearances and goals as of 6 February 2025 ‡ National team caps and goals as of 6 February 2025

Josh García (born 28 July 1993) is a professional footballer who plays as a midfielder. Born in the United States, he represents the Dominican Republic national team.

== Professional career ==
A troubled youth raised by a single mother, García began playing soccer as a youth to get away from trouble after ending up in a juvenile center for delinquents. He was a member of the varsity team at Grant High School in Oklahoma City. He was scouted by colleges, and played at Northern Oklahoma College for 2 years, before transferring to the Friends Falcons until 2016.

García broke his foot before joining Friends University, and again shortly after he was recovering. Struggling with depression, he took a break to his hometown only to find more problems when his brother was incarcerated. García turned to drinking and attempted suicide. After this depressive episode, García vowed to prevent his family from further suffering and returned to school and soccer with renewed focus. After graduating college, he only played soccer recreationally and got a job as a service rep for Lincare.

In January 2018, he joined the open tryouts for OKC Energy FC. He ended up joining their U23 team, and eventually captained them. On 10 January 2019, García signed for the senior OKC Energy FC squad for the 2019 season.

== International career ==
García was born in the United States, and is of Dominican descent. He made his professional debut for the Dominican Republic national football team in a 1-0 friendly over win Guadeloupe on 15 February 2019.

=== International goals ===
Scores and results list the Dominican Republic's goal tally first.

No.	Date	Venue	Opponent	Score	Result	Competition
1.	7 September 2019	Blakes Estate Stadium, Lookout, Montserrat	Montserrat	1–0	1–2	2019–20 CONCACAF Nations League B
