= Max Gunderson =

American soccer player

Personal information
- Date of birth: November 5, 1989 (age 36)
- Place of birth: Arcata, California, United States
- Height: 1.80 m (5 ft 11 in)
- Position: Defender

College career
| Years | Team | Apps | (Gls) |
| 2008–2011 | Incarnate Word Cardinals | | |

Senior career*
| Years | Team | Apps | (Gls) |
| 2010–2012 | Laredo Heat | 43 | (3) |
| 2013 | Austin Aztex | 13 | (0) |
| 2014 | Oklahoma City Energy | 11 | (0) |
| 2015 | Austin Aztex | 27 | (0) |
| 2016 | San Antonio FC | 10 | (0) |
| 2017 | Oklahoma City Energy U23 | 2 | (0) |
| 2018–2019 | Oklahoma City Energy | 1 | (0) |
| 2020 | Los Angeles Force | 1 | (0) |
- * Club domestic league appearances and goals as of May 6, 2021

Max Gunderson (born November 5, 1989) is an American professional soccer player who plays as a defender.

== Career ==
Gunderson played four years of college soccer at the University of the Incarnate Word between 2008 and 2011. He also played for USL PDL clubs Laredo Heat and Austin Aztex.

Gunderson signed for USL Pro club Oklahoma City Energy on February 26, 2014.
