= Jonathan Brown (Welsh footballer) =

Welsh footballer

Personal information
- Full name: Jonathan David Brown
- Date of birth: 27 April 1990 (age 36)
- Place of birth: Bridgend, Wales
- Height: 1.83 m (6 ft 0 in)
- Position: Winger

Youth career
- 2001–2007: Cardiff City

Senior career*
Years	Team	Apps	(Gls)
2007–2009	Cardiff City	2	(0)
2008–2009	→ Wrexham (loan)	21	(3)
2009	Bryntirion Athletic	7	(0)
2009–2010	Central Coast Mariners	0	(0)
2010	Montegnée		
2011	Bath City	2	(0)
2011–2012	Southport	20	(2)
2012	→ AFC Telford United (loan)	14	(1)
2012–2013	AFC Telford United	18	(0)
2013	Suphanburi	25	(15)
2013–2014	Hereford United	36	(2)
2014	Brackley Town	9	(0)
2015	Customs United		
2015–2016	Merthyr Town	57	(2)
2016–2017	Abahani Limited Dhaka	7	(4)
2017–2018	Oklahoma City Energy	34	(1)
2019	Hartford Athletic	11	(1)
2019	→ Oklahoma City Energy (loan)	19	(1)
2020–2021	Oklahoma City Energy	38	(2)
2023–2024	Penybont	12	(1)

International career^{‡}
2005–2007	Wales U17	16	(0)
2007	Wales U19	3	(1)
2008	Wales U21	7	(1)
- * Club domestic league appearances and goals as of 22 April 2024 ‡ National team caps and goals as of 4 October 2009

Jonathan David Brown (born 27 April 1990) is a Welsh professional footballer and former Wales under-21 international who plays as a winger.

== Early life ==
Born in Bridgend, Brown attended the Archbishop McGrath School as a youngster. Brown also competed in various sports, including rugby and athletics and was the Welsh 100m champion at the 12–14 age group after taking part in the Welsh games.

Brown's father, Steve, was captain of the Wales youth rugby team between 1976 and 1977.

== Club career ==
=== Cardiff City ===
Brown was originally spotted by Liverpool scout Gwyn James but was unable to sign for the Merseyside club, due to a rule meaning youth players must sign with a team within one and a half hours of their home, so he recommended him to Cardiff City. Having worked his way through the youth system at Cardiff, Brown made his first team debut against Welshpool Town in the FAW Premier Cup where he scored the only goal of the game with a free-kick to send the Bluebirds into the semi-final, becoming the first Bridgend-born player to play for Cardiff since Billy Rees. He made his league debut for Cardiff on 12 February 2008 against Coventry City when he came off the bench in the closing minutes and made a second appearance later in the season, coming on as a substitute again during a 3–1 win over Blackpool. At the end of the season he was rewarded with a one-year deal at the club, his first professional contract. Brown was the latest in a long line of recent youth players to have broken into the first team with the Bluebirds such as Joe Ledley, Chris Gunter, Darcy Blake and Aaron Ramsey.

=== Loan at Wrexham ===
Having not made an appearance for Cardiff during the 2008–09 season, Brown joined Wrexham on a two-month loan deal. He made his debut on 29 November in a 2–1 win over Stevenage Borough, setting up Jefferson Louis to score Wrexham's first goal before being replaced after 88 minutes by Shaun Whalley. He scored his first goal for the club in his very next game when he scored in the 90th minute to give Wrexham a 2–1 win over Kettering Town. On Christmas Eve, Brown was involved in a road accident while travelling back to Wrexham. On his way back from South Wales, Brown's car overturned near Welshpool and he was forced to break one of the vehicles windows in order to escape. Brown kept the incident a secret from Wrexham manager Dean Saunders until after he had played against Barrow on boxing day two days later.

Having been a first team regular during his initial loan spell, in early January it was confirmed that his loan deal had been extended by one month and at the end of the January transfer window the two clubs agreed for the loan deal to last until the end of the season. After the extended deal was agreed, manager Dean Saunders praised the impact Brown had at the side since arriving at the North Wales side. In his next game for the club, Brown scored his fourth goal of the season when he scored direct from a free-kick as Wrexham won 3–2 over Grays Athletic. In total, Brown made 27 appearances in all competitions for the club, scoring four times before returning to Cardiff, where he was released.

=== Central Coast Mariners ===
Having spent time on trial at the club, in December 2009 he joined Australian A-League side Central Coast Mariners on a contract until the end of the 2009–10 season, with the option of a possible two-year deal. However, he was released at the end of the season without making an appearance for the first team.

=== Southport ===
Following a six-month spell at the Somerset club, Brown signed for Southport, on 2 July 2011, ready for the 2011–12 season. He made his competitive club debut on 13 August 2011 on the first day of the 2011–12 season. He signed for AFC Telford United on loan for the rest of the season on 31 January 2012.

=== AFC Telford United ===
Following his release from Southport, Brown joined Telford United on a permanent deal. Jon announced to the fans of Telford that he was leaving them to move to Thailand to play over there. He played his last game at home against Wrexham in a 0–2 loss.

=== Hereford United ===
Following a successful trial, Brown signed a three-month contract with Hereford United on 25 July 2013.

=== Abahani Limited Dhaka ===
In 2016, Brown joined Bangladeshi club Abahani Limited Dhaka and won the Bangladesh Premier League in the same year. He scored his first goal in the AFC Cup on 4 April 2017 against Mohun Bagan A.C. of India.

=== USL Championship ===
Brown joined USL Championship team Oklahoma City Energy FC for the 2017 & 2018 season. On 30 January 2019 Brown joined USL Championship side Hartford Athletic ahead of their inaugural 2019 season. He rejoined Oklahoma City Energy FC on a loan on 6 June 2019 and transferred back to Oklahama for the 2020 season.

== International career ==
Brown has been a regular at various youth levels for Wales and was part of the under-19 squad that took part in the Milk Cup in 2007. He made his under-21 debut against Malta U21 on 5 February 2008, scoring his first goal for the under-21 side on 31 March 2009 in a 5–1 win over Luxembourg.

== Honours ==
=== Club ===
Abahani Limited Dhaka

- Bangladesh Premier League (1): 2015–16
