= Cody Laurendi =

American association football player

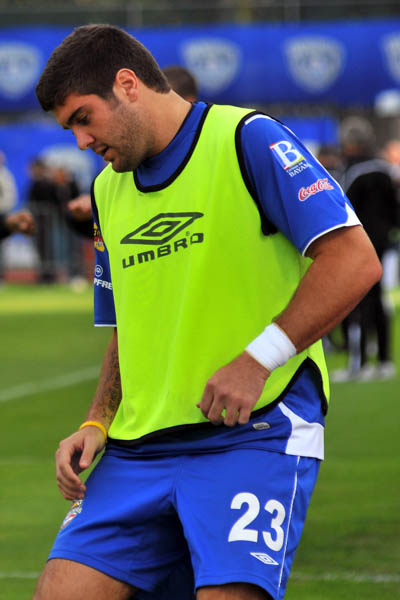

Personal information
- Full name: Cody Matthew Laurendi
- Date of birth: August 15, 1988 (age 38)
- Place of birth: Melbourne, Florida, United States
- Height: 6 ft 3 in (1.91 m)
- Position: Goalkeeper

College career
Years	Team	Apps	(Gls)
2006–2007	South Georgia Tigers		

Senior career*
Years	Team	Apps	(Gls)
2008–2010	Montegnée	5	(0)
2010–2012	Puerto Rico Islanders	5	(0)
2013	Fort Lauderdale Strikers	1	(0)
2014	LA Galaxy II	19	(0)
2015	Austin Aztex	13	(0)
2016–2020	Oklahoma City Energy	98	(0)

International career^{‡}
2017–2021	Puerto Rico	8	(0)
- * Club domestic league appearances and goals as of October 6, 2020 ‡ National team caps and goals as of March 29, 2021

Cody Laurendi (born August 15, 1988) is a Puerto Rican former professional footballer.

== Career ==
=== Youth and college ===
Laurendi attended Eau Gallie High School in Melbourne where he lettered in both soccer and in football, as a kicker. In his senior year, he was named MVP of the Brevard County All-Star game when he came on as a field player and scored 4 goals. In a newspaper interview after the match, he said, "It's the icing on the cake. I got a lot of help from my teammates. It also helps that I'm a lot larger than most of the guys out there". Laurendi also played club soccer for Space Coast United, Satellite Beach SC, and Orlando FC.

Laurendi went on to play college soccer at South Georgia College. His first year there, he was named to the Georgia Junior College All-Tournament Team. Cody then attended the Heidelberg Academic and Soccer Academy (HASA) in Liège, Belgium, where he played as a non-paid amateur for the fourth division R.R.F.C. Montegnée.

=== Professional ===
Laurendi returned to Florida in 2010 and subsequently attended open tryouts with the Puerto Rico Islanders in March 2010. After being signed by the Islanders squad as one of three back-up goalkeepers from the trial process, Laurendi was the only one they decided to keep on for the season. In his first start with the Puerto Rico Islanders, in a game versus FC Tampa Bay, Laurendi recorded a shutout for a 0–0 draw.

On March 25, 2013, the Fort Lauderdale Strikers announced that Laurendi had signed with the club as a backup to Matt Glaeser. After three games as a backup, Laurendi displaced Glaeser ahead of the Strikers rivalry clash with Tampa Bay Rowdies on April 27. Laurendi had to be substituted a half-hour into the match following a collision with a Rowdies player. The Strikers announced on May 7 that Laurendi had a lacerated kidney from the incident and would be out for the remainder of the season.

In January 2014, the LA Galaxy scouted Laurendi at a combine hosted by CB3 Sports Performance owned by Carlos Bocanegra in Upland, California. He was invited to the LA Galaxy pre-season camp and was signed to their United Soccer Leagues team, the LA Galaxy II or 'Los Dos' as the fans call the team. LA Galaxy II was the first United Soccer Leagues entry for an established MLS organization. He played 19 regular season games under coach Curt Onalfo during the 2014 season which included their first ever game, a scrimmage against the USL PDL Fresno Fuego and their regular season home opener against their Orange County, CA rivals the OC Blues - both victories for LA Galaxy II who placed third in the regular season.

Laurendi moves to the Austin Aztex, who completed their first season in 2015 as a United Soccer Leagues professional side.

After the end of the 2015 USL season, the Austin Aztex organization requested and was approved by the United Soccer Leagues to sit out the 2016 season while they pursued the development of a league compliant soccer-specific stadium. As a result, Laurendi became a free agent and signed with Oklahoma City Energy of the United Soccer Leagues on January 20, 2016.

=== International ===
In September 2016, Laurendi was called up by the Puerto Rican National Team He made his senior international debut on 13 June 2017 in a 0-0 friendly draw with Indonesia.

In 2018, Laurendi was selected as the third best goalkeeper on the CONCACAF Awards following his great performances with the Puerto Rico national team.

In 2021, he retired after playing two CONCACAF matches for the 2022 FIFA World Cup qualification.
