= Amer Šašivarević =

German footballer (born 1994)

Personal information
- Date of birth: 8 October 1994 (age 32)
- Place of birth: Munich, Germany
- Height: 1.80 m (5 ft 11 in)
- Positions: Defender; midfielder

Youth career
- 2011–2013: Real Salt Lake AZ

College career
| Years | Team | Apps | (Gls) |
| 2013–2017 | Grand Canyon Antelopes | 50 | (0) |

Senior career*
| Years | Team | Apps | (Gls) |
| 2016 | Lane United | 4 | (0) |
| 2018 | Ogden City | 6 | (0) |
| 2019 | Oklahoma City Energy | 3 | (0) |
- * Club domestic league appearances and goals as of 25 October 2019

Amer Šašivarević (born 8 October 1994) is a German professional footballer who plays as a defender.

== Career ==
=== Early and collegiate ===
Šašivarević grew up playing club soccer in Salt Lake City before being picked up by the Real Salt Lake youth academy in Casa Grande, Arizona. Where he found himself as a highly recruited athlete picking up interest from schools in the Pac-12 Conference, West Coast Conference and Western Athletic Conference.

Šašivarević accepted an offer to play four years of college soccer at Grand Canyon University between 2013 and 2017.

While at college, Šašivarević appeared for USL PDL side Lane United FC during their 2016 season.

=== Professional ===
On 21 January 2018, Šašivarević was selected 57th overall in the 2018 MLS SuperDraft by FC Dallas. However, he was not signed by the club and spent 2018 with USL PDL side Ogden City SC.

On 15 January 2019, joined USL Championship side Oklahoma City Energy.

== Personal life ==
Šašivarević was born in Munich, Germany to Bosnian parents who had fled the Bosnian War. The family emigrated to Utah in the United States
