= Nicolas Taravel =

French footballer (born 1994)

Personal information
- Full name: Nicolas Taravel
- Date of birth: 13 October 1994 (age 32)
- Place of birth: Nogent-sur-Marne, France
- Height: 1.87 m (6 ft 2 in)
- Position: Defender

Team information
- Current team: Olympic Charleroi

Youth career
- 2010–2014: Dijon

Senior career*
| Years | Team | Apps | (Gls) |
| 2013–2014 | Dijon II | 14 | (1) |
| 2014–2017 | Dinamo Zagreb II | 30 | (1) |
| 2017–2018 | Pafos | 11 | (0) |
| 2018–2019 | Grenoble | 3 | (1) |
| 2019–2021 | Oklahoma City Energy | 18 | (0) |
| 2021 | Arda Kardzhali | 8 | (0) |
| 2021–2022 | Sūduva | 36 | (2) |
| 2023– | Olympic Charleroi | 0 | (0) |
- * Club domestic league appearances and goals as of 24 November 2022

Nicolas Taravel (born 13 October 1994) is a French professional footballer who currently plays for Olympic Charleroi as a defender.

== Professional career ==
A youth product of Dijon FCO, Taravel spent his early career abroad with Dinamo Zagreb II in Croatia and Pafos FC in Cyprus. He joined Grenoble Foot 38 on 26 July 2018. Taravel made his professional debut with Grenoble in a 2–1 Coupe de la Ligue loss to Metz on 14 August 2018. He also scored in his Ligue 2 debut with Grenoble in a 4–2 win over Valenciennes FC on 14 September 2018.

On 24 January 2019, Taravel moved to the United States when he joined second-tier USL Championship side Oklahoma City Energy.

In July 2021 he signed with Lithuanian FK Sūduva.

== Personal life ==
Taravel is the younger brother of Jérémy Taravel, who is also a professional footballer.
