= Taft Stadium =

Stadium in Oklahoma, United States

- Interactive map of Taft Stadium
- Full name: Taft Stadium
- Location: Oklahoma City
- Coordinates: 35°29′45″N 97°34′01″W
- Owner: Oklahoma City Public Schools
- Operator: Oklahoma City Public Schools
- Capacity: 18,200 (1934–2013); 7,500 (2015–)
- Surface: Turf

Construction
- Groundbreaking: 1934
- Built: 1934
- Opened: 1934
- Renovated: 1999 (partial); 2013–2015
- General contractor: WPA

Tenants
- Northwest Classen HS; John Marshall HS; Oklahoma City Energy FC (USLC) (2015–2022); Oklahoma City Lightning (WFA) (2002–2010); Oklahoma City Slickers (ASL) (1982–1983)

Taft Stadium is a WPA-built stadium in Oklahoma City, Oklahoma. It is the current home to teams from Northwest Classen High School, John Marshall High School, Classen School of Advanced Studies, Oklahoma Centennial High School, as well as the former home of pro soccer club Oklahoma City Energy FC. Built in 1934, the stadium closed in 2013 and reopened in 2015 following substantial renovation. As part of the renovation, the seating capacity was reduced from approximately 18,000 to approximately 7,500, with the red-stone facade being the only feature left unaltered. A new all-weather track replaced a dirt track which was installed in 1946.

In addition to the high school uses for which it was designed, Taft Stadium briefly hosted professional football games in 1968 as the home of the Oklahoma City Plainsmen of the Continental Football League. The stadium also served as the home field for a few lower division professional soccer clubs: the Oklahoma City Slickers (1982–83), Oklahoma City Stampede (1984), and a second version of the Slickers (1993–95).

In January 2013, the Oklahoma City Public School District announced a plan to apply revenues from a past 2007 bond issue, as well as other funds, to substantially renovate both Taft Stadium and Speegle Stadium in Oklahoma City. The combined budget was $19 million, with $9.7 million of that amount allocated to Taft Stadium specifically.

In June 2013, the Oklahoma City Public Schools District announced they had granted a multi-year lease to OKC Pro Soccer, LLC, led by Tim McLaughlin. OKC Energy FC (USL Pro/Championship), owned by McLaughlin and Bob Funk, Jr. began play at Taft Stadium in 2015. A $2 per ticket surcharge supported Fields & Futures, a local nonprofit created in 2012 to support Oklahoma City Public Schools Athletics in its effort to rebuild 44 athletic fields, provide professional development, and improve resources for the district's 265 coaches and 4,500 student-athletes.

An official statement posted on OKC Energy's website in November 2022 said that the USL Championship was enforcing its policy to have all USL Championship clubs playing on home fields of at least 110 x 70 yards, starting in 2023, with no exceptions, as part of its broader efforts to improve the match experience for players and fans. With Taft Stadium not meeting this requirement, nor any other stadium in or near OKC, the Energy voluntarily paused operations until the Energy could find a viable stadium meeting the league's requirements. It had also only been two months prior that OKC Energy and Oklahoma City Public Schools (OKCPS) had renewed the Energy's multi-year lease on the stadium.

== NASCAR ==
Taft Stadium hosted a NASCAR Convertible Division race on June 8, 1956. The race was won by Allen Adkins.
