= OKC United =

American professional soccer club based in Oklahoma City

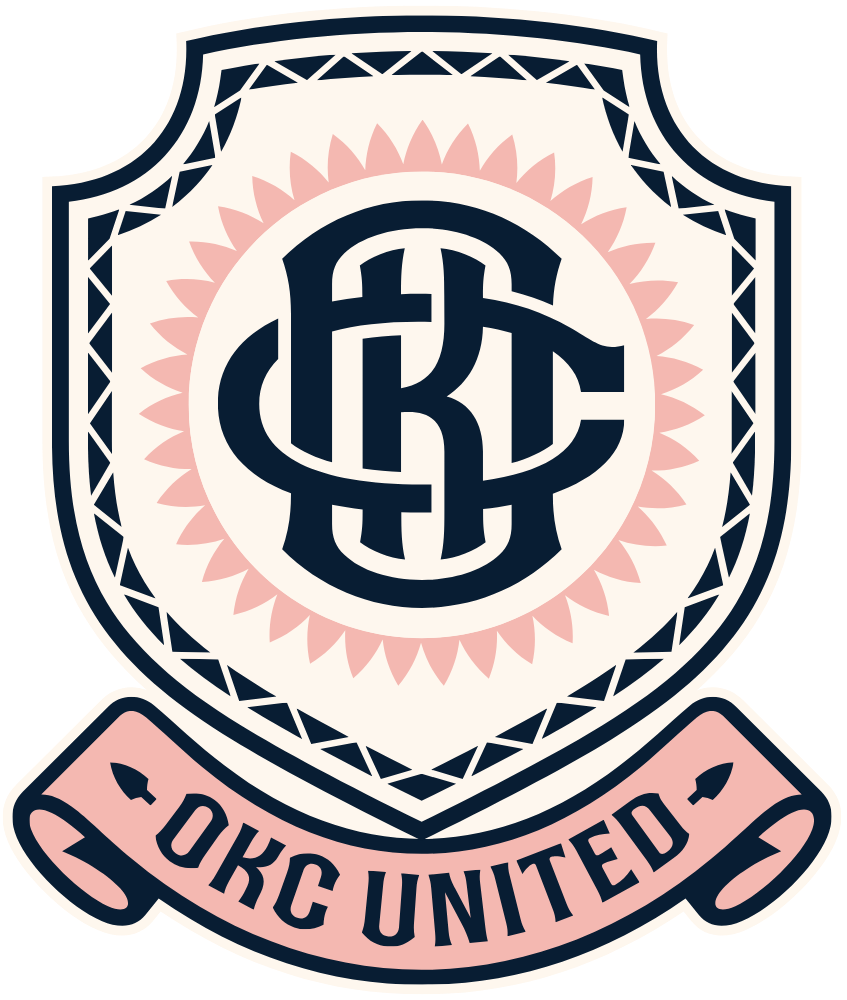
- Founded: July 2, 2013; 13 years ago (as OKC Energy FC)
- Stadium: Oklahoma City Stadium (planned); Oklahoma City, Oklahoma
- Capacity: 10,000 (planned)
- Owner: Echo
- President: Christian Kanady
- Head coach: Vacant
- League: USL Championship (on hiatus)
- Website: www.okc-united.com

OKC United is an American professional soccer club based in Oklahoma City, Oklahoma that began play in 2014 under the name Oklahoma City Energy FC. The club is a member of the USL Championship, the second division of the American soccer league system. The club has been on hiatus since 2022, having cancelled its seasons until a planned 2028 return. The club cites its inability to meet league requirements for field conditions. In 2026, the team rebranded ahead of an expected return to the USL Championship in 2028.

== History ==
Logo as Oklahoma City Energy FC

Oklahoma City businessman Robert "Bob" Funk Jr., was awarded a United Soccer League franchise on July 2, 2013, and in November, the club announced its name would be Oklahoma City Energy FC. The ownership group, Prodigal LLC, formerly Express sports, which operated the Oklahoma City Barons of the American Hockey League and formerly oversaw the Oklahoma City Dodgers (formerly Oklahoma/Oklahoma City Redhawks.) baseball team of the Pacific Coast League and the owned Oklahoma City Blazers of the Central Hockey League. Recently retired Sporting Kansas City goalkeeper Jimmy Nielsen was named Energy FC head coach for the inaugural season. Tim McLaughlin, founder of Fields & Futures, joined the club as an ownership partner before the start of the 2014 season. Energy FC won their first match away to Orange County Blues FC on April 5 and played their first home match against Orlando City SC on April 26 at Bishop McGuinness Catholic High School's Pribil Stadium. The season ended with a 10th-place finish – four points short of a playoff spot and averaging 3,702 in attendance for home matches. The club moved to the newly renovated Taft Stadium for the 2015 season and finished second in the Western Conference, making the playoffs for the first time. Energy FC advanced to the Western Conference Final, where they lost to LA Galaxy II.

For the inaugural (2014) season only, all games were broadcast on KXXY-FM radio with former Oklahoma sports personality Jack Damrill. For the 2016 and 2017 season Energy FC games were on local television on KSBI on Cox Cable Oklahoma channel 7 and simulcast on Cox digital HD channels 707. Currently, the Oklahoma City Energy FC has no radio or television deal in place.

In 2016, the team finished 7th in the Western Conference and advanced to the Western Conference semifinals. Energy FC also advanced to the fourth round of the Lamar Hunt U.S. Open Cup after defeating cross-town rival Rayo OKC 2–1 in extra time. That year also saw Energy FC host Club Deportivo Guadalajara in a friendly match played in front of 6,687 fans at Taft Stadium. Energy FC made the playoffs for a third consecutive season in 2017 after finishing 6th in the Western Conference. Back-to-back road wins earned the team a berth in the Conference Final for the second time in three years. Energy FC lost the match to Swope Park Rangers in a penalty shootout that saw both sides attempting 10 shots each, with the deciding goals coming down to each team's goalkeepers. That year also saw the club host another international friendly, against 2017 Champions League winners CF Pachuca.

Before the 2018 season, Steve Cooke was named head coach of the club, a year after serving as interim head coach at MLS side Colorado Rapids. Energy FC narrowly missed the USL Playoffs, competing for a spot until the final month of the season. Cooke was succeeded by John Pascarella in 2019. On June 4, 2021, following a winless start to the 2021 USL Championship season, Pascarella and the OKC Energy mutually agreed to part ways.

The club is currently not fielding a roster and, having relieved head coach Leigh Veidman, have gone on an indefinite hiatus due to a club cited inability to meet league requirements for field conditions. Following investment group Echo purchasing the club, and a land donation to the city for a new stadium, the club plans to return in 2028 with a potential women's side, following the completion of their new stadium. Investors in the revived team include Russell Westbrook, Jozy Altidore, Nik Bonitto, Baker Mayfield, Jalen Williams, and Sydney McLaughlin-Levrone. On July 15, 2026, the club announced a rebranding to OKC United.

== Stadium ==
For the 2014 season, home games began being played at Pribil Stadium on the campus of Bishop McGuinness Catholic High School and introduced their team kits and logo. In 2015, the club moved to Historic Taft Stadium following extensive renovations made to that facility.

=== New stadium ===
On December 10, 2019, Oklahoma City voters approved MAPS 4, a sales tax extension planned to fund 16 major projects over 8 years. MAPS 4 allocates $41 million towards the construction of a multipurpose stadium that would serve as the new home field for the Energy. After city government's search for a final site and design for the stadium concluded, a location was identified near lower Bricktown where the new Oklahoma City Thunder arena and new transit area is to be built. Should the stadium be fully constructed, the 42-acre site's stadium will be able to host 12,300 guests and host both OKC Energy and a potential professional women's soccer team. The plan was approved by city council unanimously on November 19, 2024. In 2025, OKC will vote on a bond issue to provide an additional $50 million to expand the new stadium with a second level which would increase seating to 15,000–16,000. The stadium is expected to be completed in 2028.

== Club culture ==
=== Supporters ===
OKC Energy have five recognized supporters groups: The Grid, La Furia Verde, OKC Breakers, Northend United, and Main St. Greens.

=== Rivalries ===
OKC Energy's main rivals are FC Tulsa, with both teams being located in Oklahoma. The teams compete in the Black Gold Derby. The supporters group of both teams established a trophy, a 4-foot wrench painted with the colors of each team on either side, which is awarded to the regular season winner of the derby. OKC leads the series against Tulsa in all competitions with a record of 10–8–5 (W-D-L) and has secured the wrench four years ('15, '16, '18, and '19) out of the seven that the rivalry has been in existence.

=== Affiliated teams ===
The club was formerly associated with FC Dallas of Major League Soccer from 2015 through 2018. They were affiliated with Sporting Kansas City from 2014 through 2015 before that.

=== Sponsorship ===
Local, family-owned First Fidelity Bank became the inaugural jersey sponsor in 2014.

Period	Kit manufacturer	Shirt sponsor
2014–2016	(England) Admiral	First Fidelity Bank
2017–2019	(United States) Under Armour	First Fidelity Bank
2020–2021	(Germany) Adidas	First Fidelity Bank

== Year-by-year ==
Year	Division	League	Regular season	Playoffs	U.S. Open Cup	Avg. attendance
2014	3	USL Pro	10th	Did not qualify	Third round	3,784
2015	3	USL	2nd, Western	Conference finals	Fourth round	4,635
2016	3	USL	7th, Western	Conference semifinals	Fourth round	4,950
2017	2	USL	6th, Western	Conference finals	Fourth round	4,293
2018	2	USL	10th, Western	Did not qualify	Second round	4,298
2019	2	USLC	15th, Western	Did not qualify	Fourth round	4,442
2020	2	USLC	17th, Western; 5th, Group D	Did not qualify	Cancelled	N/A
2021	2	USLC	5th, Atlantic Division	Did not qualify	Cancelled	2,265
2022–2027	Did not play					

=== Head coaches ===
- Includes USL regular season, USL playoffs, U.S. Open Cup

Coach	Nationality	Start	End	Games	Win	Draw	Loss	Win %
Jimmy Nielsen	Denmark	December 20, 2013	November 16, 2017	136	54	38	44	39.71
Steve Cooke	England	December 20, 2017	October 22, 2019	72	23	18	31	31.94
John Pascarella	United States	November 22, 2019	June 4, 2021	23	1	11	11	4.35
Leigh Veidman	England	June 4, 2021	January 30, 2023	25	8	9	8	32.00
Total				256	86	76	94	33.59

=== Top goalscorers ===
- Includes USL regular season, USL playoffs, U.S. Open Cup

As of October 10, 2021

#	Name	Career	Goals
1	(Denmark) Danni König	2015–2017	27
2	(United States) Alex Dixon	2017–2018	20
3	(United States) Kyle Greig	2014–2015	19
4	(Jamaica) Deshorn Brown	2018–2019	17
5	(United States) Michael Thomas	2014–2016	12
5	(Bulgaria) Villyan Bijev	2021	12
7	(Poland) Wojciech Wojcik	2016–2017	11
7	(Colombia) José Angulo	2017–2018	11
7	(Mexico) Miguel González	2017–2018	11
10	(Denmark) Sebastian Dalgaard	2015–2016	9
10	(United States) Christian Volesky	2018	9
