= 2014 OKC Energy FC season =

OKC Energy FC
2014 season
- Chairman: Bob Funk, Jr.
- Manager: Jimmy Nielsen
- Stadium: Pribil Stadium
- USL Pro: 10th of 14
- USL Pro Playoffs: did not qualify
- U.S. Open Cup: Third round
- Highest home attendance: 4,722 vs Charleston (August 24)
- Lowest home attendance: 2,813 vs Arizona (July 17)
- Average home league attendance: 3,702
Home colors	Away colors

The 2014 Oklahoma City Energy FC season was the club's first season in existence, and their first season playing in the USL Pro, the third tier of the American soccer pyramid. It was the first season for an Oklahoma-based professional soccer club since 2000, when the Tulsa Roughnecks disbanded.

== Review ==
Oklahoma City Energy FC played its first ever match against University of Nebraska-Omaha, the match being a friendly. Five other pre-season friendlies were scheduled against Oral Roberts University, Northeastern State University, Tyler Junior College, Midwestern State University, and Southern Methodist University. The Energy went 5-0-1 in their preseason. The Energy finished the season 9-14-5, in tenth place in the USL Pro and did not qualify for the playoffs.

== Roster ==
No.	Position	Nation	Player
2	DF	USA	Kyle Miller
3	MF	USA	Peabo Doue
4	DF	CMR	Cyprian Hedrick
5	DF	WAL	Gareth Evans
6	DF	USA	Tarek Morad
7	MF	USA	David Leichty
8	MF	USA	Michael Thomas
9	MF	USA	Christian Duke (on loan from Sporting Kansas City)
10	MF	DEN	Philip Lund
11	FW	DEN	Adda Djeziri
12	DF	USA	Max Gunderson
13	MF	USA	Dan Delgado
16	GK	USA	Samir Badr
17	MF	ENG	Paul Wyatt
18	MF	USA	Nate Shiffman
20	MF	USA	Abraham Villon
21	FW	USA	Steven Perry
22	FW	USA	Kyle Greig
23	DF	ENG	Mark Howard
24	GK	USA	Ray Clark
25	FW	USA	Javier Castro
26	MF	COL	Jimmy Medranda (on loan from Sporting Kansas City)
27	FW	USA	Nate Polak (on loan from Minnesota United)

== Competitions ==
=== Preseason ===
March 8, 2014 Preseason	Oklahoma City Energy FC	1 - 0	University of Nebraska Omaha	Norman, Oklahoma
7:00 p.m. CST	Wyatt 85'	Report		Stadium: Norman North High School; Referee: Paul Scott, Lance Stewart, Darren Klimon, Eric Baye

March 12, 2014 Preseason	Oral Roberts University	1 - 4	Oklahoma City Energy FC	Tulsa, Oklahoma
6:00 p.m. CDT	Chavez 81'	Report	Thomas 47' (pen.); Morad 51'; Greig	Stadium: Case Soccer Complex

March 14, 2014 Preseason	Oklahoma City Energy FC	5 - 1	Northeastern State University	Edmond, Oklahoma
6:00 p.m. CDT	Greig 5', 75'; Thomas 39' (pen.); Perry 66', 78'	Report	Morales 86' (pen.)	Stadium: Edmond Soccer Club; Referee: Nima Sagahfi, Sam Merchant, Adam Bass

March 19, 2014 Preseason	Tyler Junior College	0 - 5	Oklahoma City Energy FC	Tyler, Texas
7:00 p.m. CST			Schmetz 21', 85'; Thomas 31' (pen.); Doue 61'; Miller 65'	Stadium: Pat Hartley Soccer Complex

March 22, 2014 Preseason	Southern Methodist University	1 - 1	Oklahoma City Energy FC	University Park, Texas
7:00 p.m. CST	Hickey 85'		Djeziri 32'	Stadium: Westcott Field

March 29, 2014 Preseason	Oklahoma City Energy FC	3 - 0	Midwestern State University	Yukon, Oklahoma
7:00 p.m. CDT	Doue 47'; Duke 80'; Wyatt 90'	Report		Stadium: Yukon Public Schools Soccer Stadium; Referee: Jared Rigsby, Sue-Z Moskal, Edwin Zunan, Roy Robinson

=== Results summary ===
Overall								Home						Away					
Pld	W	D	L	GF	GA	GD	Pts	W	D	L	GF	GA	GD	W	D	L	GF	GA	GD
28	9	5	14	32	37	−5	32	5	2	7	12	14	−2	4	3	7	20	23	−3

Source: Match reports

Round	1	2	3	4	5	6	7	8	9	10	11	12	13	14	15	16	17	18	19	20	21	22	23	24	25	26	27	28
Stadium	A	A	A	A	H	A	H	H	A	H	A	A	H	H	H	H	H	H	A	A	H	A	H	H	A	H	A	A
Result	W	L	W	L	L	L	L	L	L	W	D	D	W	D	W	W	D	L	D	W	W	L	L	L	L	L	L	W

Updated to match(es) played on May 10, 2014. Source: Match reports
A = Away; H = Home; W = Win; D = Draw; L = Loss

April 5, 2014 1	Orange County Blues FC	0 - 2	Oklahoma City Energy FC	Irvine, California
9:00 p.m. CDT	Momeni (yellow card) 62'; Rivera (yellow card) 68' (red card) 86'; Russell (yellow card) 70'	Report	Greig 11' (yellow card) 46'; Shiffman 30'	Stadium: Anteater Stadium; Attendance: 1,221; Referee: Robert Sarfaraz

April 7, 2014 2	LA Galaxy II	4 - 2	Oklahoma City Energy FC	Carson, California
9:30 p.m. CDT	Courtois 14'; Hoffman 35'; Steres 39'; Auras (yellow card) 48'; Djokovic 90+'	Report	Doue 8'; Morad (yellow card) 45'; Thomas (yellow card) 57'; Caringi 59'	Stadium: StubHub Center Track & Field Stadium; Attendance: 525; Referee: Christopher Calderon

April 12, 2014 3	Arizona United SC	0 - 4	Oklahoma City Energy FC	Peoria, Arizona
9:00 p.m. CDT	Woodberry (yellow card) 37' (red card) 43'	Report	Perry 46'; Greig 51'; Miller 65'; Evans (yellow card) 61'; Djeziri 71'	Stadium: Peoria Sports Complex; Attendance: 2,088; Referee: Israel Fernandez

April 15, 2014 4	FC Dallas Reserves	1 - 0	Oklahoma City Energy FC	Frisco, Texas
7:00 p.m. CDT	Jacobson 53'; Hollingshead (yellow card) 50'; Reeves (yellow card) 88'; Hernandez (red card) 90+'	Report	Greig (yellow card) 22'; Shiffman (yellow card) 42'	Stadium: Toyota Stadium; Attendance: 341; Referee: Pedro Trejo Jr.

April 26, 2014 5	Oklahoma City Energy FC	1 - 2	Orlando City SC	Oklahoma City, Oklahoma
7:00 p.m. CDT	Evans (yellow card) 74'; Perry 90+'	Report	Chin 26'; Molino 57'; Clark (yellow card) 89'	Stadium: Pribil Stadium; Attendance: 4,230; Referee: Tony Mensah

May 4, 2014 6	Orlando City SC	3 - 1	Oklahoma City Energy FC	Lake Buena Vista, Florida
6:30 p.m. CDT	Chin 33,48'; Alvarez 34'; Turner (yellow card) 47'; Pulis (yellow card) 86'	Report	Lund 41'; Thomas (yellow card) 65'	Stadium: ESPN Wide World of Sports Complex; Attendance: 4,532; Referee: Marcos Oliveria

May 10, 2014 7	Oklahoma City Energy FC	0 - 1	Orange County Blues FC	Oklahoma City, Oklahoma
7:00 p.m. CDT	Ellis (yellow card) 6'	Report	Gautrat (yellow card) 35'; Turner (yellow card) 90+'; Bardsley 90+'	Stadium: Pribil Stadium; Attendance: 3,860; Referee: Juliana Duncan

May 16, 2014 8	Oklahoma City Energy FC	1 - 4	Richmond Kickers	Oklahoma City, Oklahoma
7:00 p.m. CDT	Duke (yellow card) 35'; Greig 81'; Howard (yellow card) 88'	Report	Delicâte 1'; Yomby 30'; Asante (yellow card) 30'; Lee 45+'; Seaton (yellow card) 61' (goal) 88'; Davis IV (yellow card) 85'	Stadium: Pribil Stadium; Attendance: 3,916; Referee: Jon Freemon

May 25, 2014 9	LA Galaxy II	5 - 0	Oklahoma City Energy FC	Carson, California
10:00 p.m. CDT	Hoffman 13,22' (pen.); Jamieson 51,55'; McBean 69'	Report		Stadium: StubHub Center Track & Field Stadium; Attendance: 738; Referee: Tyler Ploeger

May 31, 2014 10	Oklahoma City Energy FC	1 - 0	New York Red Bulls Reserves	Oklahoma City, Oklahoma
7:00 p.m. CDT	Leichty (yellow card) 6'; Duke (yellow card) 31'; Thomas 90+'	Report	Bustamante (yellow card) 20'; Oyongo (yellow card) 43'; Miazga (yellow card) 90'	Stadium: Pribil Stadium; Attendance: 3,777; Referee: Fotis Bazakos

June 6, 2014 11	Wilmington Hammerheads	2 - 2	Oklahoma City Energy FC	Wilmington, North Carolina
6:30 p.m. CDT	Fairclough (yellow card) 28'; Ochoa 45'; Parratt 65'; Musa (yellow card) 70' (red card) 71'	Report	Lund 50'; Morad (yellow card) 58'; Greig 78'; Lopez (yellow card) 85'	Stadium: Legion Stadium; Attendance: 2,164; Referee: Michael Jozaitis

June 7, 2014 12	Charlotte Eagles	1 - 1	Oklahoma City Energy FC	Charlotte, North Carolina
6:00 p.m. CDT	Herrera (yellow card) 34'; Thompson 48'	Report	Perry 33'; Wyatt (yellow card) 39'	Stadium: Dickson Field; Attendance: 556; Referee: Jon Freemon

June 14, 2014 13	Oklahoma City Energy FC	2 - 0	Sacramento Republic FC	Oklahoma City, Oklahoma
7:00 p.m. CDT	Djeziri 36'; Lopez (yellow card) 48'; Thomas 81'; Howard (yellow card) 86'	Report	Mirkovic (red card) 31'; Fochive (yellow card) 41'; Lopez (yellow card) 56'; Daly (yellow card) 73'; Evans (yellow card) 85'	Stadium: Pribil Stadium; Attendance: 4,010; Referee: Elvis Mahmutovic

June 22, 2014 14	Oklahoma City Energy FC	0 - 0	Rochester Rhinos	Oklahoma City, Oklahoma
7:00 p.m. CDT		Report		Stadium: Pribil Stadium; Attendance: 3,405; Referee: Brook Weiss

June 28, 2014 15	Oklahoma City Energy FC	2 - 0	Sacramento Republic FC	Oklahoma City, Oklahoma
7:00 p.m. CDT	Howard (yellow card) 35'; Howard 53'; Evans (yellow card) 56'; Lopez 67'	Report	Fochive (yellow card) 64'	Stadium: Pribil Stadium; Attendance: 3,643; Referee: Nima Saghafi

July 12, 2014 16	Oklahoma City Energy FC	2 - 0	Pittsburgh Riverhounds	Oklahoma City, Oklahoma
7:00 p.m. CDT	Thomas 5'; Delgado 19'; Thomas (yellow card) 66'	Report	Vincent (yellow card) 66'	Stadium: Pribil Stadium; Attendance: 3,619; Referee: Greg Dopka

July 17, 2014 17	Oklahoma City Energy FC	1 - 1	Arizona United SC	Oklahoma City, Oklahoma
7:00 p.m. CDT	Djeziri (yellow card) 44'; Evans (yellow card) 81'; Thomas 90+' (pen.)	Report	DelPiccolo (yellow card) 44'; Tan 45+'; Dillon (yellow card) 90'; Top (yellow card) 90+'	Stadium: Pribil Stadium; Attendance: 2,813; Referee: Leland Grant

July 19, 2014 18	Oklahoma City Energy FC	0 - 1	LA Galaxy II	Oklahoma City, Oklahoma
7:00 p.m. CDT	Hedrick (yellow card) 43'; Leichty (yellow card) 55'	Report	Stojkov (yellow card) 45+'; Emory (yellow card) 67'; Mendiola 75'	Stadium: Pribil Stadium; Attendance: 4,102; Referee: Kyle Phillips

July 23, 2014 19	Harrisburg City Islanders	3 - 3	Oklahoma City Energy FC	Harrisburg, Pennsylvania
6:00 p.m. CDT	Bahner 18'; Ribeiro 23,84'; Langley (yellow card) 62'; Baúque (yellow card) 78'; Ribeiro (yellow card) 90'	Report	Delgado 37'; Greig 38,44'; Perry (yellow card) 52'	Stadium: Skyline Sports Complex; Attendance: 2,312; Referee: Ernie Constantine

July 26, 2014 20	Dayton Dutch Lions	0 - 3	Oklahoma City Energy FC	Dayton, Ohio
6:00 p.m. CDT	Granger (yellow card) 22'	Report	Greig 42'; Thomas (yellow card) 46'; Wyatt 52'; Wyatt (yellow card) 87'; Thomas 90+'	Stadium: DOC Stadium; Attendance: 437; Referee: Tony Crush

August 2, 2014 21	Oklahoma City Energy FC	1 - 0	Orange County Blues FC	Oklahoma City, Oklahoma
7:00 p.m. CDT	Thomas (yellow card) 82'; Leichty 88'	Report	Peay (yellow card) 26'	Stadium: Pribil Stadium; Attendance: 3,351; Referee: Nima Saghafi

August 9, 2014 22	Sacramento Republic FC	2 - 1	Oklahoma City Energy FC	Sacramento, California
10:00 p.m. CDT	Jahn 16'; Hedrick 18' (o.g.); Mirkovic (yellow card) 36'; Daly (yellow card) 72'; Gleeson (yellow card) 80'	Report	Perry (yellow card) 51'; Greig 74'	Stadium: Bonney Field; Attendance: 8,000; Referee: Joe Dickerson

August 14, 2014 23	Oklahoma City Energy FC	1 - 2	Arizona United SC	Oklahoma City, Oklahoma
7:00 p.m. CDT	Thomas (yellow card) 41'; Djeziri 77'	Report	Top 4'; Robinson (yellow card) 33'; Stisser (yellow card) 34'; Garza 74' (p.k.); Garza (yellow card) 79'; DelPiccolo (yellow card) 85'; Newton (yellow card) 87'	Stadium: Pribil Stadium; Attendance: 3,438; Referee: Jody Pinkerton

August 16, 2014 24	Oklahoma City Energy FC	0 - 1	LA Galaxy II	Oklahoma City, Oklahoma
7:00 p.m. CDT	Doue (yellow card) 38'; Badr (yellow card) 79'	Report	Steres 19'; Sorto (yellow card) 30'; Diallo (yellow card) 80' (red card) 90'; Stojkov (yellow card) 90+'	Stadium: Pribil Stadium; Attendance: 4,089; Referee: Andrew Musashe

August 22, 2014 25	Arizona United SC	1 - 0	Oklahoma City Energy FC	Peoria, Arizona
9:40 p.m. CDT	Morrison 76'; Dillon (yellow card) 88'; Dacres (red card) 90+'	Report	Howard (yellow card) 21' (red card) 45+'; Hedrick (yellow card) 74'; Morad (red card) 90+'	Stadium: Peoria Sports Complex; Attendance: 3,588; Referee: Ramy Toucan

August 24, 2014 26	Oklahoma City Energy FC	0 - 2	Charleston Battery	Oklahoma City, Oklahoma
7:00 p.m. CDT		Report	Sanyang (yellow card) 23' (red card) 90'; Kelly (yellow card) 60'; Sanyang 79'; Cordovers 90+'	Stadium: Pribil Stadium; Attendance: 4,722; Referee: Charles Farr

September 4, 2014 27	Sacramento Republic FC	1 - 0	Oklahoma City Energy FC	Sacramento, California
9:30 p.m. CDT	Lopez 49' (pen.); Vukovic (yellow card) 70'; Evans (yellow card) 70'	Report	Evans (yellow card) 17'	Stadium: Bonney Field; Attendance: 8,000; Referee: Ricardo Salazar

September 6, 2014 28	Orange County Blues FC	0 - 1	Oklahoma City Energy FC	Irvine, California
9:00 p.m. CDT	Hoxie (yellow card) 14'; Franco (yellow card) 64'; Moses (yellow card) 78'; Gautrat (yellow card) 80'	Report	Duke (yellow card) 37'; Greig 62'	Stadium: Anteater Stadium; Referee: Chris Calderon

==== Standings ====
Pos	Team	Pld	W	T	L	GF	GA	GD	Pts	Qualification
8	Harrisburg City Islanders (A)	28	10	7	11	45	46	−1	37	Playoffs
9	Arizona United SC	28	10	5	13	32	47	−15	33 (Note: Arizona was deducted two points for fielding an ineligible player on June 21 against LA Galaxy II.)	
10	Oklahoma City Energy FC	28	9	5	14	32	37	−5	32	
11	Pittsburgh Riverhounds	28	9	5	14	35	49	−14	32	
12	Charlotte Eagles	28	9	4	15	33	40	−7	31	

Source: USL Pro official standings
Rules for classification: 1) points; 2) goal difference; 3) number of goals scored.
(A) Advances to USL Pro Playoffs

=== U.S. Open Cup ===
Oklahoma City Energy FC will enter the U.S. Open Cup in the second round.

May 14, 2014 Second round	Tulsa Athletics	0–2	Oklahoma City Energy FC	Tulsa, Oklahoma
7:30pm CDT	Howard (yellow card) 26'; Sarri (yellow card) 39'; Leung (red card) 77'; Brocks (red card) 90+'	Report	Leichty 10'; Craingi 69'	Stadium: Athletics Stadium

May 28, 2014 Third round	Arizona United SC	2–1 (a.e.t.)	Oklahoma City Energy FC	Peoria, Arizona
9:30pm CDT	Kassel (yellow card) 58'; Okafor 84'; Saint Cyr (yellow card) 86'; Woodberry (yellow card) 105'; Baladez 112'; Dillon (red card) 114'	Report	Hedrick (yellow card) 27'; Shiffman (yellow card) 34'; Thomas (red card) 47'; Miller (yellow card) 55'; Greig 90+'; Doue (yellow card) 105'	Stadium: Peoria Sports Complex; Attendance: 1,539

== Transfers ==
=== Transfers In ===
No.	Pos.	Player	Previous club	Fee/notes	Date	Source
8	MF	(United States) Michael Thomas	(Canada) Toronto FC	Free	January 29, 2014	
4	DF	(Cameroon) Cyprian Hedrick	(United States) Phoenix FC	Free	February 4, 2014	
2	MF	(United States) Kyle Miller	(United States) Sporting Kansas City	Free	February 5, 2014	
18	MF	(United States) Nate Shiffman	(United States) Virginia Commonwealth University	Free	February 5, 2014	
5	MF	(Wales) Gareth Evans	(United States) Wilmington Hammerheads FC	Free	February 14, 2014	
10	MF	(Denmark) Philip Lund	(United States) Seattle Sounders FC	Free	February 14, 2014	
17	MF	(England) Paul Wyatt	(United States) James Madison University	Free	February 14, 2014	
16	GK	(United States) Samir Badr	(Egypt) Haras El-Hodood	Free	February 18, 2014	
3	DF	(United States) Peabo Doue	(United States) Phoenix FC	Free	February 18, 2014	
24	GK	(United States) Jennings Clark	(United States) Northern Oklahoma College	Free (successful trial)	February 26, 2014	
22	FW	(United States) Kyle Greig	(United States) Wilmington Hammerheads FC	Free	February 26, 2014	
12	DF	(United States) Max Gunderson	(United States) Austin Aztex FC	Free	February 26, 2014	
6	DF	(United States) Tarek Morad	(United States) University of California, Irvine	Free	February 27, 2014	
21	FW	(United States) Steven Perry	(United States) Wilmington Hammerheads FC	Free	March 10, 2014	
11	FW	(Denmark) Adda Djeziri	(England) Scunthorpe United FC	Free	March 12, 2014	
23	CB	(England) Mark Howard	(Denmark) Aarhus Gymnastikforening	Free	March 19, 2014	
14	FW	(United States) Pete Caringi III	(Canada) Impact de Montréal	Free	March 26, 2014	
7	MF	(United States) David Leichty	(United States) Sporting Kansas City Academy	Free		

=== Loans in ===
Start date	End date	Position	No.	Player	From club
14 March 2014		GK	1	(United States) Jon Kempin	(United States) Sporting Kansas City
14 March 2014		MF	9	(United States) Christian Duke	(United States) Sporting Kansas City
