= 2015 OKC Energy FC season =

OKC Energy FC
2015 season
- Chairman: Bob Funk, Jr.
- Manager: Jimmy Nielsen
- Stadium: Taft Stadium
- USL Playoffs: Conference Finals vs LA Galaxy II
- U.S. Open Cup: Fourth Round vs FC Dallas
- Top goalscorer: League: Danni König (19); All: Danni König (20)
- Highest home attendance: 6,797; Seattle 2 (April 18)
- Lowest home attendance: 3,133; Portland 2 (June 5)
- Average home league attendance: 4,465
Home colors	Away colors

The 2015 Oklahoma City Energy FC season was the club's second season in existence, and their second season playing in the United Soccer League, the third tier of the American soccer pyramid.

== Background ==
This is the first season where Oklahoma City Energy FC plays its full season at Taft Stadium.

== Roster ==
No.	Position	Nation	Player
1	GK	USA	Evan Newton
2	DF	USA	Jacob VanCompernolle
3	MF	USA	Peabo Doue
4	DF	CMR	Cyprian Hedrick
5	DF	WAL	Gareth Evans
6	MF	USA	Dan Delgado
7	MF	DEN	Sebastian Dalgaard
8	MF	USA	Michael Thomas
9	FW	DEN	Danni König
10	MF	MEX	Chuy Sanchez
11	FW	USA	Casey Townsend
12	MF	USA	Daniel Gonzalez
14	MF	USA	Mikey Lopez (on loan from Sporting Kansas City)
15	MF	USA	Reed McKenna
16	GK	USA	Bryan Byars
17	MF	HUN	Peter Toth
19	DF	USA	Michael Harris
20	MF	USA	Christian Duke
21	DF	USA	Kalen Ryden
22	FW	USA	Kyle Greig
24	GK	USA	Ray Clark
25	MF	DEN	Michael Byskov
26	DF	USA	Coady Andrews

== Competitions ==
=== IMG Suncoast Pro Classic ===
February 18, 2015 1	Toronto FC	0–1	Oklahoma City Energy FC	Bradenton, Florida
6:30 PM CST	Morgan (yellow card) 67'	Report	Greig 52'; Evans (yellow card) 52'	Stadium: IMG Academy

February 21, 2015 2	New York Red Bulls	1–0	Oklahoma City Energy FC	Bradenton, Florida
1:30 PM CST	Sanchez 10'	Report		Stadium: IMG Academy

February 25, 2015 3	Oklahoma City Energy FC	0–0	(Denmark) HB Køge	Bradenton, Florida
1:30 PM CST		Report		Stadium: IMG Academy

February 28, 2015 4	Oklahoma City Energy FC	1–4	Columbus Crew SC	Bradenton, Florida
4:00 PM CST	Gonzalez 78'	Report	Steindórsson 32'; Finlay 34'; Higuaín 65'; Kamara 87'	Stadium: IMG Academy

=== Preseason ===
March 5, 2015 Friendly	Oklahoma City Energy FC	canceled	Saint Louis FC	Springfield, Missouri
6:00 PM CST				Stadium: Betty & Bobby Allison South Soccer Stadium

March 14, 2015 Friendly	Oklahoma City Energy FC	3–0	Omaha Mavericks	Oklahoma City, Oklahoma
7:00 PM CDT	König 8'; Thomas 55' (pen.); VanCompernolle 86'	Report		Stadium: Casady School Soccer Field

March 21, 2015 Friendly	Oklahoma City Energy FC	5–1	Missouri Valley Vikings	Oklahoma City, Oklahoma
3:00 PM CDT	Hedrick 10'; König 57,74'; Townsend 63'; Dalgaard 69'	Report		Stadium: Casady School Soccer Field

=== Results summary ===
Overall								Home						Away					
Pld	W	D	L	GF	GA	GD	Pts	W	D	L	GF	GA	GD	W	D	L	GF	GA	GD
24	12	7	5	39	28	+11	43	10	2	1	23	8	+15	2	5	4	16	20	−4

Source: Match reports

Round	1	2	3	4	5	6	7	8	9	10	11	12	13	14	15	16	17	18	19	20	21	22	23	24	25	26	27	28
Stadium	A	A	H	H	A	A	A	H	H	H	H	H	A	A	A	A	H	H	A	H	H	A	H	H	A	A	H	A
Result	D	W	W	L	D	L	D	W	W	W	W	W	L	L	L	D	D	D	D	W	W	W	W	W	L	L	D	W

Updated to match(es) played on February 2, 2015. Source: Match reports
A = Away; H = Home; W = Win; D = Draw; L = Loss

March 28, 2015 1	Tulsa Roughnecks FC	1–1	Oklahoma City Energy FC	Tulsa, Oklahoma
7:00 PM CDT	Galbraith-Knapp (yellow card) 56'; Ballew 71'; Bardsley (yellow card) 90'	Report	König (yellow card) 41'; Thomas 45+'; Hedrick (yellow card) 85'	Stadium: ONEOK Field; Attendance: 8,335; Referee: Jon Freemon

April 4, 2015 2	Colorado Springs Switchbacks FC	1–2	Oklahoma City Energy FC	Colorado Springs, Colorado
2:00 PM CDT	Harada (yellow card) 23'; Burt (yellow card) 48' (yellow-red card) 57'; Badr (yellow card) 58'; Seth 68'	Report	Lopez (yellow card) 12'; König 35,90+'; Evans (yellow card) 58'	Stadium: Sand Creek Stadium; Attendance: 2,990; Referee: Adam Finney

April 18, 2015 3	Oklahoma City Energy FC	2–1	Seattle Sounders FC 2	Oklahoma City, Oklahoma
7:00 PM CDT	Sanchez 38'; König 86'	Report	Jones 33'; Sanyang (yellow card) 45+'	Stadium: Taft Stadium; Attendance: 6,797; Referee: Leszek Stalmach

April 25, 2015 4	Oklahoma City Energy FC	1–2	St. Louis FC	Oklahoma City, Oklahoma
7:00 PM CDT	Sanchez 13'; Hedrick (red card) 81'	Report	Hardware 32'; Ambersley 42'; Bushue (yellow card) 60'; Lynch (red card) 81'; Ranken (yellow card) 90'	Stadium: Taft Stadium; Attendance: 4,383; Referee: William Tomlinson

May 1, 2015 5	Austin Aztex	1–1	Oklahoma City Energy FC	Austin, Texas
8:00 PM CDT	Yates 20,25'; Roushandel (yellow card) 65'	Report	König 16'; Dalgaard (yellow card) 81'; Greig 87'	Stadium: House Park; Attendance: 2,696; Referee: Alex Chilowicz

May 15, 2015 6	Seattle Sounders FC 2	3–1	Oklahoma City Energy FC	Tukwila, Washington
9:30 PM CDT	Lim (yellow card) 5'; Mansaray (yellow card) 36'; Craven 56,80'; Anderson 79'	Report	Townsend (yellow card) 35'; Dalgaard 49'; König (yellow card) 83'	Stadium: Starfire Sports Complex; Attendance: 2,118; Referee: Younes Marrakchi

May 17, 2015 7	Vancouver Whitecaps FC 2	2–2	Oklahoma City Energy FC	Vancouver, British Columbia
4:00 PM CDT	Andrews 13' (o.g.); Piraux (yellow card) 18'; Serban 60'	Report	Greig 9'; Byskov (yellow card) 25'; Thomas 87'; McKenna (yellow card) 90+'	Stadium: Thunderbird Stadium; Attendance: 1,217; Referee: Michelle Pye

May 23, 2015 8	Oklahoma City Energy FC	2–1	Sacramento Republic FC	Oklahoma City, Oklahoma
7:00 PM CDT	Dalgaard 20'; König 35'; Doue (yellow card) 66' (yellow-red card) 80'; Dalgaard (yellow card) 60'	Report	López (red card) 9'; Iwasa (yellow card) 44'; Foran (yellow card) 45'; Vuković (yellow card) 45'; Gabeljic 62'	Stadium: Taft Stadium; Attendance: 3,717; Referee: Nima Saghafi

May 31, 2015 9	Oklahoma City Energy FC	1–0	Austin Aztex	Oklahoma City, Oklahoma
7:00 PM CDT	Greig 72'	Report	Rozeboom (yellow card) 22'; Golden (yellow card) 65'	Stadium: Taft Stadium; Attendance: 4,291; Referee: Mike Arrington

June 5, 2015 10	Oklahoma City Energy FC	2–0	Portland Timbers 2	Oklahoma City, Oklahoma
7:00 PM CDT	Gonzalez (yellow card) 38'; Greig (yellow card) 42'; Greig 56,78'	Report	Rose (red card) 28'; Thoma (yellow card) 73'	Stadium: Taft Stadium; Attendance: 3,133; Referee: Rasende Mendoza

June 9, 2015 11	Oklahoma City Energy FC	2–0	Vancouver Whitecaps FC 2	Oklahoma City, Oklahoma
7:00 PM CDT	Sanchez (yellow card) 55'; König 64' (pen.), 68'; Lopez (yellow card) 70'; Evans (yellow card) 88'	Report		Stadium: Taft Stadium; Attendance: 3,330; Referee: David Mon

June 13, 2015 12	Oklahoma City Energy FC	2–0	Tulsa Roughnecks FC	Oklahoma City, Oklahoma
7:00 PM CDT	König 27'; Evans 49'	Report	Galbraith-Knapp (yellow card) 31'; Ochoa (yellow card) 41'	Stadium: Taft Stadium; Attendance: 4,777; Referee: Greg Dopka

June 20, 2015 13	Sacramento Republic FC	2–1	Oklahoma City Energy FC	Sacramento, California
10:00 PM CDT	Andrews 39' (o.g.); Mirkovic (yellow card) 45+'; Vukovic (yellow card) 73'; Gissie 80'	Report	König 19'; Greig (yellow card) 22'	Stadium: Bonney Field; Attendance: 11,442; Referee: Younes Marrakchi

June 27, 2015 14	Louisville City FC	6–2	Oklahoma City Energy FC	Louisville, Kentucky
6:30 PM CDT	Rasmussen 26,60' (pen.); Fondy 39,57,87'; Quinn (yellow card) 50'; Fondy (yellow card) 52'; Dacres 67'	Report	Dalgaard 17'; König 51' (pen.); VanCompernolle (yellow card) 62'; König (yellow card) 62'; Dalgaard (red card) 82'	Stadium: Louisville Slugger Field; Attendance: 6,646; Referee: Tony Crush

July 1, 2015 15	Orange County Blues FC	1–0	Oklahoma City Energy FC	Irvine, California
9:30 PM CDT	Ramírez 33'; Payeras (yellow card) 67'; Turner (red card) 79'	Report		Stadium: Anteater Stadium; Attendance: 684; Referee: Michael Zapata

July 5, 2015 16	LA Galaxy II	1–1	Oklahoma City Energy FC	Carson, California
7:00 PM CDT	Auras 12'; Villarreal (yellow card) 90'; Bailey (yellow card) 90+'	Report	König 7'	Stadium: StubHub Center; Attendance: 507; Referee: Michael Radchuk

July 11, 2015 17	Oklahoma City Energy FC	2−2	Orange County Blues FC	Oklahoma City, Oklahoma
7:00 PM CDT	König 38,62'	Report	Santana 20'; Slager 52'	Stadium: Taft Stadium; Attendance: 4,835; Referee: Trent Payne

July 18, 2015 18	Oklahoma City Energy FC	1–1	Tulsa Roughnecks FC	Oklahoma City, Oklahoma
7:00 PM CDT	Byskov (yellow card) 24'; König 60' (pen.); Thomas (yellow card) 69'; Duke (yellow card) 90+'	Report	Bond (yellow card) 13'; Price (yellow card) 46'; Ballew 50'; Ochoa (yellow card) 66'	Stadium: Taft Stadium; Attendance: 4,541; Referee: Jeremy Kieso

July 25, 2015 19	St. Louis FC	0–0	Oklahoma City Energy FC	Fenton, Missouri
7:30 PM CDT	Bushue (yellow card) 50'; Renken (yellow card) 77'; Ambersley (yellow card) 83'	Report	Evans (yellow card) 41'	Stadium: St. Louis Soccer Park; Attendance: 5,304; Referee: Greg Dopka

July 31, 2015 20	Oklahoma City Energy FC	3–0	Arizona United SC	Oklahoma City, Oklahoma
7:00 PM CDT	Evans (yellow card) 45+'; König 55' (pen.), 80'; Gonzalez (yellow card) 90+'; Evans 90+'	Report	Tan (yellow card) 35'; Okafor (yellow card) 43'; Johnson (yellow card) 82'	Stadium: Taft Stadium; Attendance: 3,976; Referee: Rosendo Mendoza

August 4, 2015 21	Oklahoma City Energy FC	2–0	LA Galaxy II	Oklahoma City, Oklahoma
7:00 PM CDT	Toth 19'; Dalgaard 35'; Townsend (yellow card) 59'	Report	McBean (yellow card) 48'; Lassiter (yellow card) 72'	Stadium: Taft Stadium; Attendance: 4,337; Referee: Jon Freemon

August 8, 2015 22	Portland Timbers 2	3–4	Oklahoma City Energy FC	Portland, Oregon
9:00 PM CDT	Fochive 45+,46'; Fochive (yellow card) 75'; Seaton 79'; Jeanderson (yellow card) 81'	Report	König 19,31,34'; Greig 29'; Dalgaard (yellow card) 57'; Evans (yellow card) 83'	Stadium: Merlo Field; Attendance: 2,433; Referee: Ekaterina Koroleva

August 15, 2015 23	Oklahoma City Energy FC	1–0	Real Monarchs	Oklahoma City, Oklahoma
7:00 PM CDT	Greig 74'	Report	McGovern (yellow card) 58'; Arnone (yellow card) 68'	Stadium: Taft Stadium; Attendance: 3,872; Referee: Estaban Rosano

August 29, 2015 24	Oklahoma City Energy FC	2–0	Austin Aztex	Oklahoma City, Oklahoma
7:00 PM CDT	Dalgaard 39'; Evans (yellow card) 57'; König (yellow card) 73'; König 88'	Report	Timbo (yellow card) 73'	Stadium: Taft Stadium; Attendance: 6,089; Referee: Matthew Kreitzer

September 2, 2015 25	Real Monarchs	2-0	Oklahoma City Energy FC	Sandy, Utah
8:00 PM CDT				Stadium: Rio Tinto Stadium

September 6, 2015 26	Tulsa Roughnecks FC	2-1	Oklahoma City Energy FC	Tulsa, Oklahoma
7:30 PM CDT				Stadium: ONEOK Field

September 12, 2015 27	Oklahoma City Energy FC	3-3	Colorado Springs Switchbacks FC	Oklahoma City, Oklahoma
7:00 PM CDT				Stadium: Taft Stadium

September 16, 2015 28	Arizona United SC	0-1	Oklahoma City Energy FC	Scottsdale, Arizona
9:30 PM CDT				Stadium: Scottsdale Stadium

=== Conference semifinal ===
Sunday October 10, 2015	Oklahoma City Energy FC	2–2 (a.e.t.) (4–3 p)	Colorado Springs Switchbacks FC	Oklahoma City, Oklahoma
6:00 pm CDT	Sanchez 45+'; Thomas (yellow card) 90'; Doue 98' (yellow card) 99'	Report; Report	Vercollone 6'; Burt (yellow card) 14'; Argueta (yellow card) 39'; Armstrong (yellow card) 90+'; King 105'; Gonzalez (yellow card) 105+'	Stadium: Taft Stadium; Attendance: 6,370; Referee: Rubiel Vazquez
	Penalties
	König (penalty scored); Evans (penalty scored); Thomas (penalty scored); Ryden (penalty scored)		(penalty scored) Vercollone; (penalty missed) Maybin; (penalty scored) Robinson; (penalty scored) Hoffman; (penalty missed) Gonzalez

== Conference Finals ==
October 11, 2015	Oklahoma City Energy FC	1–2	LA Galaxy II	Oklahoma City, Oklahoma
6:00 pm CDT	Evans (yellow card) 31'; Andrews 66'	Report	Lassiter 7'; Auras 23'; Maganto (yellow card) 89'	Stadium: Taft Stadium; Attendance: 7,654; Referee: Jaime Herrera

=== Standings ===
Pos	Team	Pld	W	D	L	GF	GA	GD	Pts	Qualification
1	Orange County Blues	28	14	5	9	38	34	+4	47	Conference semi-finals
2	Oklahoma City Energy	28	13	8	7	44	36	+8	47	Conference semi-finals
3	Colorado Springs Switchbacks	28	14	4	10	53	35	+18	46	First round
4	Sacramento Republic	28	13	7	8	43	31	+12	46	First round
5	LA Galaxy II	28	14	3	11	39	31	+8	45	First round

Source: 2015 USL schedule
Rules for classification: 1) head-to-head; 2) total wins; 3) total goal differential; 4) total goals scored; 5) disciplinary points; 6) away goals scored; 7) away goal differential; 8) home goals scored; 9) home goal differential; 10) coin toss or drawing of lots

=== U.S. Open Cup ===
Oklahoma City Energy FC entered the U.S. Open Cup in the second round.

May 20, 2014 Second Round	Midland/Odessa Sockers	1–3	Oklahoma City Energy FC	Midland, Texas
7:30pm CDT	Sanchez 68'	Report	Greig 42', 70'; Townsend 51'; Hedrick (yellow card) 55'	Stadium: Grande Communications Stadium; Attendance: 545

May 27, 2014 Third Round	Tulsa Roughnecks	0–1	Oklahoma City Energy FC	Tulsa, Oklahoma
7:00 PM CDT	Bradsley (yellow card) 32'	Report	Tóth 82'; Dalgaard (yellow card) 85'; Tóth (yellow card) 90+'	Stadium: ONEOK Field

June 16, 2015 Fourth Round	FC Dallas	4–1	Oklahoma City Energy FC	Ft Worth, Texas
8:00 PM CDT	Texeira 21,51'; Lyod (yellow card) 31'; Barrios 34,36'	Report	König 82'	Stadium: Garvey-Rosenthal Soccer Stadium; Attendance: 1,106; Referee: Daniel Fitzgerald

== Transfers ==
=== Loans in ===
Start date	End date	Position	No.	Player	From club
24 March 2014		MF	14	(United States) Mikey Lopez	(United States) Sporting Kansas City

== See also ==
- Oklahoma City Energy FC
- 2015 in American soccer
- 2015 USL season
