= 2012 Sporting Kansas City season =

Sporting Kansas City
2012 season
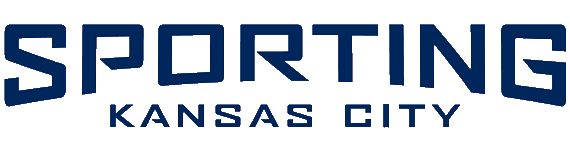
- Owner: Sporting Club
- Head coach: Peter Vermes
- Stadium: Livestrong Sporting Park
- MLS: East: 1st Overall: 2nd
- MLS Cup: Quarterfinals
- U.S. Open Cup: Champions
- Top goalscorer: League: Kei Kamara (11); All: Kei Kamara (12)
- Highest home attendance: 21,010 v Chicago Fire (September 28, 2012)
- Lowest home attendance: 15,161 v FC Dallas (March 25, 2012)
- Average home league attendance: 19,405
Home colors	Away colors

The 2012 Sporting Kansas City season was the seventeenth season of the team's existence in Major League Soccer and the second year played under the Sporting Kansas City moniker.

== Overview ==
=== Preseason ===
==== Late 2011 ====
Preparations for the 2012 Major League Soccer season began only a day after the 2011 MLS Cup. On November 21, 2011, Ryan Smith was traded to Chivas USA for 1st and 3rd round draft picks in the 2012 MLS Supplemental Draft. Later the same day, all MLS teams were required to submit a list of 11 protected players for the 2011 MLS Expansion Draft to be held for the newly formed Montreal Impact. The club chose to protect Davy Arnaud, Matt Besler, Teal Bunbury, Aurélien Collin, Roger Espinoza, Kei Kamara, Chance Myers, Jimmy Nielsen, Júlio César, C. J. Sapong, and Graham Zusi.

During the expansion draft on November 23, the Montreal Impact selected unprotected Sporting leftback Seth Sinovic. Later the same day, Sporting KC waived Scott Lorenz, Miloš Stojčev, Craig Rocastle, and Jéferson. The following Monday (November 28), Sporting traded team captain Davy Arnaud to the Montreal Impact for Sinovic and allocation money. The club also announced that starting goalkeeper Jimmy Nielsen signed a contract extension through the 2013 season, with an option for the 2014 season. On November 29, Sporting KC acquired Paulo Nagamura from Chivas USA for the 1st round supplemental draft pick that was part of the November 21 Ryan Smith trade.

In December, Sporting traded an international roster slot to the San Jose Earthquakes in exchange for two-time MLS All-Star and World Cup veteran winger Bobby Convey. Later in December, Sporting and Mexican club Cruz Azul agreed to a deal that would see Omar Bravo return to his home country.

==== Early 2012 ====
Sporting Kansas City resumed its off-season transactions at the 2012 MLS SuperDraft and 2012 MLS Supplemental Draft. Generation adidas forward Dom Dwyer of South Florida was selected 16th overall in the SuperDraft, and he was joined by defender Cyprian Hedrick of Coastal Carolina in the second round. Between the two drafts, Sporting acquired the rights to local product Michael Thomas from the Earthquakes in exchange for a fourth-round supplemental pick. Thomas officially signed on January 18. On January 17, Sporting selected Shawn Singh, Pablo Punyed, Stefan Antonijevic, and Kyle Miller in the 2012 MLS Supplemental Draft. On January 19, yet another trade with the Earthquakes saw the acquisition of forward Jacob Peterson. On February 22, defender Daneil Cyrus was waived.

== Squad ==
=== First team roster ===
As of December 12, 2012.

No.	Position	Nation	Player
1	GK	DEN	Jimmy Nielsen (Captain)
2	DF	USA	Michael Harrington
3	DF	ENG	Korede Aiyegbusi
4	DF	USA	Kevin Ellis (HGP)
5	DF	USA	Matt Besler
6	MF	BRA	Paulo Nagamura
7	DF	USA	Chance Myers
8	MF	USA	Graham Zusi
9	FW	USA	Teal Bunbury
11	MF	USA	Bobby Convey
12	MF	POL	Konrad Warzycha
13	MF	KEN	Lawrence Olum
14	FW	ENG	Dom Dwyer (GA)
15	MF	HON	Roger Espinoza
16	DF	USA	Seth Sinovic
17	FW	USA	C. J. Sapong
18	GK	USA	Eric Kronberg
19	MF	HAI	Peterson Joseph
20	MF	ESP	Oriol Rosell
21	GK	USA	Jon Kempin (HGP)
22	FW	USA	Soony Saad
23	FW	SLE	Kei Kamara
24	DF	CMR	Cyprian Hedrick
25	DF	BIH	Neven Marković
27	DF	USA	Kyle Miller
28	GK	USA	Scott Avengine
37	MF	USA	Jacob Peterson
55	DF	BRA	Júlio César
78	DF	FRA	Aurélien Collin
88	MF	USA	Michael Thomas

== Player movement ==
=== In ===
Date	Player	Position	Previous club	Fee/notes	Ref
November 28, 2011	(United States) Seth Sinovic	DF	(Canada) Montreal Impact	Acquired with allocation money for Davy Arnaud	
November 29, 2011	(Brazil) Paulo Nagamura	MF	(United States) Chivas USA	Acquired for a first-round 2012 MLS Supplemental Draft pick	
December 2, 2011	(United States) Bobby Convey	MF	(United States) San Jose Earthquakes	Acquired for a 2012 international roster slot	
January 12, 2012	(England) Dom Dwyer	FW	(United States) University of South Florida	Superdraft, 1st Round	
January 18, 2012	(United States) Michael Thomas	MF	(Sweden) Ljungskile SK	Signed after MLS rights acquired from (United States) San Jose Earthquakes for a fourth-round 2012 MLS Supplemental Draft pick	
January 20, 2012	(United States) Jacob Peterson	FW	(United States) San Jose Earthquakes	Free	
February 21, 2012	(Cameroon) Cyprian Hedrick	DF	(United States) Coastal Carolina University	Superdraft, 2nd Round	
March 19, 2012	(United States) Shawn Singh	DF	(United States) UCLA	Supplemental Draft, 1st Round	
May 30, 2012	(United States) Kyle Miller	DF	(United States) Rockhurst University	Supplemental Draft, 3rd Round	
July 6, 2012	(Serbia) Neven Marković	DF	(Greece) Doxa Drama F.C.	Undisclosed	
July 24, 2012	(United States) Scott Angevine	GK	(United States) Coastal Carolina University	Free	
August 2, 2012	(Spain) Oriol Rosell	MF	(Spain) Barcelona B	Undisclosed	

=== Out ===
Date	Player	Position	Destination club	Fee/notes	Ref
November 21, 2011	(England) Ryan Smith	MF	(United States) Chivas USA	Trade	
November 23, 2011	(United States) Seth Sinovic	DF	(Canada) Montreal Impact	Expansion Draft	
November 23, 2011	(United States) Scott Lorenz	DF	(United States) Fort Lauderdale Strikers	Waived	
November 23, 2011	(Brazil) Jéferson	MF	(Brazil) Esporte Clube Bahia	Waived	
November 23, 2011	(Grenada) Craig Rocastle	MF	(Greece) Thrasyvoulos F.C.	Waived	
November 23, 2011	(Serbia) Miloš Stojčev	DF	(Kazakhstan) FC Akzhayik	Waived	
November 28, 2011	(United States) Davy Arnaud	MF	(Canada) Montreal Impact	Trade	
December 12, 2011	(Mexico) Omar Bravo	FW	(Mexico) Cruz Azul	Free	
February 22, 2012	(Trinidad and Tobago) Daneil Cyrus	DF	(Trinidad and Tobago) W Connection	Waived	
March 26, 2012	(Senegal) Birahim Diop	FW	None	Waived	
June 29, 2012	(United States) Luke Sassano	MF	(United States) Carolina RailHawks	Waived	
July 6, 2012	(United States) Shawn Singh	DF	None	Waived	

=== Loans ===
==== In ====
Date	Player	Position	Loaned from	Fee/notes	Ref

==== Out ====
Date	Player	Position	Loaned to	Fee/notes	Ref
August 28, 2012	(Poland) Konrad Warzycha	MF	(United States) Carolina RailHawks	Recalled back to Sporting KC on September 12, 2012	

== Major League Soccer ==
=== League table ===
Pos	Team	Pld	W	L	T	GF	GA	GD	Pts	Qualification
1	San Jose Earthquakes (S)	34	19	6	9	72	43	+29	66	CONCACAF Champions League
2	Sporting Kansas City	34	18	7	9	42	27	+15	63	CONCACAF Champions League
3	D.C. United	34	17	10	7	53	43	+10	58	
4	New York Red Bulls	34	16	9	9	57	46	+11	57	
5	Real Salt Lake	34	17	11	6	46	35	+11	57	
6	Chicago Fire	34	17	11	6	46	41	+5	57	
7	Seattle Sounders FC	34	15	8	11	51	33	+18	56	
8	LA Galaxy (C)	34	16	12	6	59	47	+12	54	CONCACAF Champions League
9	Houston Dynamo	34	14	9	11	48	41	+7	53	CONCACAF Champions League
10	Columbus Crew	34	15	12	7	44	44	0	52	
11	Vancouver Whitecaps FC	34	11	13	10	35	41	−6	43	
12	Montreal Impact	34	12	16	6	45	51	−6	42	CONCACAF Champions League
13	FC Dallas	34	9	13	12	42	47	−5	39	
14	Colorado Rapids	34	11	19	4	44	50	−6	37	
15	Philadelphia Union	34	10	18	6	37	45	−8	36	
16	New England Revolution	34	9	17	8	39	44	−5	35	
17	Portland Timbers	34	8	16	10	34	56	−22	34	
18	Chivas USA	34	7	18	9	24	58	−34	30	
19	Toronto FC	34	5	21	8	36	62	−26	23	

Source: MLS
Rules for classification: 1) points; 2) head-to-head record; 3) goal difference; 4) number of goals scored
(C) MLS Cup Champion; (S) Supporters' Shield

=== Eastern Conference standings ===
Pos	Team	Pld	W	L	T	GF	GA	GD	Pts	Qualification
1	Sporting Kansas City	34	18	7	9	42	27	+15	63	MLS Cup Conference Semifinals
2	D.C. United	34	17	10	7	53	43	+10	58	MLS Cup Conference Semifinals
3	New York Red Bulls	34	16	9	9	57	46	+11	57	MLS Cup Conference Semifinals
4	Chicago Fire	34	17	11	6	46	41	+5	57	MLS Cup Knockout Round
5	Houston Dynamo	34	14	9	11	48	41	+7	53	MLS Cup Knockout Round
6	Columbus Crew	34	15	12	7	44	44	0	52	
7	Montreal Impact	34	12	16	6	45	51	−6	42	
8	Philadelphia Union	34	10	18	6	37	45	−8	36	
9	New England Revolution	34	9	17	8	39	44	−5	35	
10	Toronto FC	34	5	21	8	36	62	−26	23	

Source: MLS

=== Results summary ===
Overall								Home						Away					
Pld	Pts	W	L	T	GF	GA	GD	W	L	T	GF	GA	GD	W	L	T	GF	GA	GD
34	63	18	7	9	42	27	+15	10	3	4	22	12	+10	8	4	5	20	15	+5

Last updated: October 25, 2012
Source: MLSSoccer.com
Pld = Matches played; Pts = Points; W = Matches won; T = Matches tied; L = Matches lost; GF = Goals for; GA = Goals against; GD = Goal difference

=== Match results ===
Win Tie Loss

==== Preseason ====
February 4, 2012	Sporting Kansas City	2–1	San Jose Earthquakes	Tucson, Arizona
12:00 CDT	Kamara 4'; Warzycha 81'	Report	Wondolowski 3'	Stadium: Kino Sports Complex

February 11, 2012	Sporting Kansas City	2–1	D.C. United	Casa Grande, Arizona
13:00 CDT	Zusi 34'; Saad 62'	Report	Burciaga 78'	Stadium: Grande Sports World

February 14, 2012	Sporting Kansas City	5–1	FC Tucson	Tucson, Arizona
12:00 CDT	Kamara 18'; Espinoza 40'; Dwyer 70', 79', 90'	Report	Reid Schmitt 65'	Stadium: Kino Sports Complex

===== 2012 Disney Pro Soccer Classic =====
February 24, 2012	Sporting Kansas City	0–0	Houston Dynamo	Lake Buena Vista, Florida
17:00 CDT		Report		Stadium: ESPN Wide World of Sports Complex

February 26, 2012	Sporting Kansas City	1–1	Montreal Impact	Lake Buena Vista, Florida
14:00 CDT	Saad 70'	Report	Fucito 37'	Stadium: ESPN Wide World of Sports Complex

February 29, 2012	Sporting Kansas City	0–3	Vancouver Whitecaps FC	Lake Buena Vista, Florida
17:00 CDT		Report	Le Toux 50'; Teibert 62'; Mitchell 67'	Stadium: ESPN Wide World of Sports Complex

===== Exhibition Matches =====
March 1, 2012	Sporting Kansas City	4–1	United States U-17	Lake Buena Vista, Florida
10:00 CDT	Konrad Warzycha 6'; Kyle Miller 50'; Saad 64' 67' (pen.)	Report	Rubio Rubin 14'	Stadium: ESPN Wide World of Sports Complex

March 13, 2012	Sporting Kansas City	2–0	Rockhurst University	Kansas City, Kansas
07:00 CDT	Sassano 22'; Dom Dwyer 34'	Report		Stadium: Livestrong Sporting Park

==== Regular season ====
March 10, 2012 1	D.C. United	0–1	Sporting Kansas City	Washington, D.C.
20:30 CDT	Bošković (yellow card) 54'	Report	Bunbury (yellow card) 52'; Sapong 90+3'	Stadium: RFK Stadium; Attendance: 16,134; Referee: Mark Geiger

March 17, 2012 2	Sporting Kansas City	3–0	New England Revolution	Kansas City, Kansas
19:30 CDT	Zusi 28' (yellow card) 28'; Kamara 39'; Myers (yellow card) 45'; Sapong 47'	Report	McCarthy (red card) 14'	Stadium: Livestrong Sporting Park; Attendance: 19,777; Referee: Silviu Petrescu

March 25, 2012 3	Sporting Kansas City	2–1	FC Dallas	Kansas City, Kansas
18:00 CDT	Collin (yellow card) 32' (goal) 49+'; Myers (yellow card) 36'; Kamara 88'; Espinoza (yellow card) 93+'	Report	Villar 25'; Hernandez (yellow card) 49+'	Stadium: Livestrong Sporting Park; Attendance: 15,161; Referee: Abiodun Okulaja

April 1, 2012 4	Chivas USA	0–1	Sporting Kansas City	Carson, California
20:00 CDT	McKenzie (yellow card) 84'	Report	Sinovic (yellow card) 34'; Sapong 47'	Stadium: The Home Depot Center; Attendance: 13,372; Referee: Edvin Jurisevic

April 7, 2012 5	Sporting Kansas City	1–0	Los Angeles Galaxy	Kansas City, Kansas
15:00 CDT	Kamara 40'	Report	Donovan (yellow card) 90'	Stadium: Livestrong Sporting Park; Attendance: 20,323; Referee: Jorge Gonzalez

April 14, 2012 6	Sporting Kansas City	1–0	Real Salt Lake	Kansas City, Kansas
19:30 CDT	Collin 63'; Nagamura (yellow card) 76'	Report	Johnson (yellow card) 51'; Steele (yellow card) 78'	Stadium: Livestrong Sporting Park; Attendance: 19,422; Referee: Kevin Stott

April 18, 2012 7	Vancouver Whitecaps FC	1–3	Sporting Kansas City	Vancouver, British Columbia
21:00 CDT	Hassli (yellow card) 6'; DeMerit (yellow card) 67'; Le Toux 79'	Report	Collin (yellow card) 18' (goal) 24'; Nagamura (yellow card) 38'; Bonjour 51' (o.g.); Kamara 65'; Nielsen (yellow card) 80'	Stadium: BC Place; Attendance: 15,382; Referee: Baldomero Toledo

April 21, 2012 8	Portland Timbers	1–0	Sporting Kansas City	Portland, Oregon
21:30 CDT	Purdy (yellow card) 22'; Myers 41' (o.g.); Palmer (yellow card) 44'; Boyd (yellow card) 81'	Report	Collin (yellow card) 66'; Besler (yellow card) 88'	Stadium: Jeld-Wen Field; Attendance: 20,438; Referee: Hilario Grajeda

May 5, 2012 9	Sporting Kansas City	0–2	Montreal Impact	Kansas City, Kansas
19:30 CDT	César (yellow card) 35'	Report	Felipe 30'; Rivas (yellow card) 36'; Bernier (yellow card) 45'; Ubiparipovic (yellow card) 53'; Bernier 64' (pen.); Wahl (yellow card) 77'	Stadium: Livestrong Sporting Park; Attendance: 20,404; Referee: Juan Guzman

May 12, 2012 10	Chicago Fire	2–1	Sporting Kansas City	Bridgeview, Illinois
19:30 CDT	Pardo (yellow card) 38'; Segares (yellow card) 40'; Grazzini 61' (pen.); Puppo (yellow card) 79'; Oduro 81'	Report	César (yellow card) 4'; Convey 31'; Myers (yellow card) 57'; Espinoza (red card) 62'; Kamara (yellow card) 90+3'	Stadium: Toyota Park; Attendance: 14,159; Referee: Jose Carlos Rivero

May 19, 2012 11	Colorado Rapids	2–2	Sporting Kansas City	Commerce City, Colorado
20:00 CDT	Marshall 52'; Kimura 60'	Report	Bunbury 2' 14'; Convey (yellow card) 51'	Stadium: Dick's Sporting Goods Park; Attendance: 15,269; Referee: Edvin Jurisevic

May 27, 2012 12	Sporting Kansas City	2–1	San Jose Earthquakes	Kansas City, Kansas
15:30 CDT	Sapong 5'; Espinoza (yellow card) 29'; Kamara 39'; Olum (yellow card) 79'; Nielson (yellow card) 90'	Report	Gordon (yellow card) 45'; Hernandez (yellow card) 61'; Dawkins 72'	Stadium: Livestrong Sporting Park; Attendance: 19,974; Referee: Baldomero Toledo

June 16, 2012 13	Sporting Kansas City	2–0	Toronto FC	Kansas City, Kansas
19:30 CDT	Sapong 18'; César 35'; Bunbury (yellow card) 82'	Report	Lambe (yellow card) 55'; Johnson (yellow card) 77'	Stadium: Livestrong Sporting Park; Attendance: 20,488; Referee: Gavin Ward

June 20, 2012 14	Seattle Sounders FC	1–1	Sporting Kansas City	Seattle, Washington
21:00 CDT	Ianni 15'; Scott (yellow card) 89'; Fernandez (red card) 90+1'	Report	Peterson 8'; Collin (yellow card) 16'; Olum (yellow card) 48'; Nielsen (yellow card) 59'	Stadium: CenturyLink Field; Attendance: 46,932; Referee: Jair Marrufo

June 23, 2012 15	Philadelphia Union	4–0	Sporting Kansas City	Chester, Pennsylvania
18:00 CDT	McInerney 1' 42'; Carroll (yellow card) 17'; Gaddis (yellow card) 25'; Lahoud (yellow card) 63'; Pajoy 81' (pen.); Hoppenot 87'	Report	César (yellow card) 22'	Stadium: PPL Park; Attendance: 18,708; Referee: Terry Vaughn

June 29, 2012 16	Sporting Kansas City	0–1	Chicago Fire	Kansas City, Kansas
19:00 CDT	Nielsen (yellow card) 86'	Report	Anibaba (yellow card) 33'; Pappa 58'; Rolfe (yellow card) 87'	Stadium: Livestrong Sporting Park; Attendance: 19,274; Referee: Baldomero Toledo

July 4, 2012 17	Montreal Impact	1–3	Sporting Kansas City	Montreal, Quebec
18:00 CDT	Martins (yellow card) 36'; Bernier 49'; Warner (yellow card) 67'; Arnaud (yellow card) 69'	Report	Zusi (yellow card) 16' (goal) 75' (pen.); Kamara 57' (pen.); Peterson 82'; Sinovic (yellow card) 90'	Stadium: Saputo Stadium; Attendance: 12,085; Referee: Sorin Stoica

July 7, 2012 18	Sporting Kansas City	0–0	Houston Dynamo	Kansas City, Kansas
19:00 CDT		Report		Stadium: Livestrong Sporting Park; Attendance: 19,307; Referee: Chris Penso

July 14, 2012 19	Columbus Crew	0–2	Sporting Kansas City	Columbus, Ohio
18:30 CDT	Anor (yellow card) 8'; Renteria (yellow card) 69'; Birchall (yellow card) 83'	Report	Peterson 6'; Joseph (yellow card) 57'; Nagamura (yellow card) 69'; Bunbury 82'	Stadium: Crew Stadium; Attendance: 17,588; Referee: Edvin Jurisevic

July 18, 2012 20	Houston Dynamo	2–1	Sporting Kansas City	Houston, Texas
19:30 CDT	Kandji (yellow card) 8'; Carr 25' 79'	Report	Kamara 42' (pen.); Joseph (red card) 47+'	Stadium: BBVA Compass Stadium; Attendance: 19,761; Referee: Mark Kadlecik

July 21, 2012 21	Sporting Kansas City	0–0	New England Revolution	Kansas City, Kansas
19:30 CDT	Harrington (yellow card) 50'; Besler (yellow card) 66'	Report	Barnes (yellow card) 47'	Stadium: Livestrong Sporting Park; Attendance: 19,080; Referee: Jason Anno

July 28, 2012 22	Sporting Kansas City	1–2	Columbus Crew	Kansas City, Kansas
19:30 CDT	Kamara 8'	Report	Arrieta 17' 34'; Birchall (yellow card) 71'; Grossman (yellow card) 94+' (yellow-red card) 95+'	Stadium: Livestrong Sporting Park; Attendance: 18,938; Referee: David Gantar

August 4, 2012 23	New England Revolution	0–1	Sporting Kansas City	Foxborough, Massachusetts
18:30 CDT	Guy (yellow card) 54'; Feilhaber (yellow card) 77'	Report	Bunbury 20'; Olum (yellow card) 56'; Besler (yellow card) 88'	Stadium: Gillette Stadium; Attendance: 17,592; Referee: Geoff Gamble

August 11, 2012 24	Sporting Kansas City	2–1	D.C. United	Kansas City, Kansas
19:30 CDT	Thomas (yellow card) 2'; Bunbury 13'; Espinoza (yellow card) 49'; Zusi 63' (yellow card) 90'; Sapong (yellow card) 92+'	Report	DeLeon 23'; Saragosa (yellow card) 46'; Dudar (yellow card) 94+'	Stadium: Livestrong Sporting Park; Attendance: 20,439; Referee: Edvin Jurisevic

August 18, 2012 25	Toronto FC	0–1	Sporting Kansas City	Toronto, Ontario
15:30 CDT	Frings (yellow card) 7'; Hassli (yellow card) 49'	Report	Collin (yellow card) 12'; Myers (yellow card) 60'; Kamara 83'	Stadium: BMO Field; Attendance: 18,151; Referee: Jorge Gonzalez

August 26, 2012 26	Sporting Kansas City	1–1	New York Red Bulls	Kansas City, Kansas
20:00 CDT	Kamara 4'; Collin (yellow card) 35'; Espinoza (yellow card) 68'; Sapong (yellow card) 76'	Report	Kamara 28' (o.g.); Cahill (yellow card) 45'; Conde (yellow card) 77'	Stadium: Livestrong Sporting Park; Attendance: 18,491; Referee: Hilario Grajeda

September 1, 2012 27	Sporting Kansas City	2–1	Toronto FC	Kansas City, Kansas
19:30 CDT	Kamara (yellow card) 10'; Nagamura 60'; Rosell 87'	Report	Johnson 44'; Dunfield (yellow card) 59'	Stadium: Livestrong Sporting Park; Attendance: 18,481; Referee: Allen Chapman

September 14, 2012 28	Sporting Kansas City	1–1	Houston Dynamo	Kansas City, Kansas
19:30 CDT	Sapong 93'	Report	Davis 58'; Luiz Camargo (yellow card) 86'	Stadium: Livestrong Sporting Park; Attendance: 19,887; Referee: Baldomero Toledo

September 19, 2012 29	New York Red Bulls	0–2	Sporting Kansas City	Harrison, New Jersey
18:00 CDT		Report	Sapong 12'; Kamara 19'; Espinoza (yellow card) 37'	Stadium: Red Bull Arena; Attendance: 10,286; Referee: David Gantar

September 22, 2012 30	Montreal Impact	0–0	Sporting Kansas City	Montreal, Quebec
12:00 CDT	Warner (yellow card) 55'; Arnaud (yellow card) 77'	Report	Cesar (yellow card) 58'; Peterson (red card) 89'; Joseph (yellow card) 90+3'	Stadium: Saputo Stadium; Attendance: 20,521; Referee: Jorge Gonzalez

September 28, 2012 31	Sporting Kansas City	2–0	Chicago Fire	Kansas City, Kansas
19:30 CDT	Zusi 11', 90+6'; Nagamura (yellow card) 70'	Report	Friedrich (yellow card) 23'; Segares (yellow card) 72' (red card) 90+4'	Stadium: Livestrong Sporting Park; Attendance: 21010; Referee: Chris Penso

October 7, 2012 32	Columbus Crew	1–1	Sporting Kansas City	Columbus, Ohio
15:00 CDT	James (yellow card) 67'; Gaven 90+1'	Report	Sapong 10'	Stadium: Crew Stadium; Attendance: 13,566; Referee: Mark Geiger

October 20, 2012 33	New York Red Bulls	0–0	Sporting Kansas City	Harrison, New Jersey
18:00 CDT	Holgersson (yellow card) 38'; Henry (yellow card) 44'; Sam (yellow card) 70'	Report	Kamara (yellow card) 54'	Stadium: Red Bull Arena; Attendance: 25,219; Referee: Silviu Petrescu

October 24, 2012 34	Sporting Kansas City	2–1	Philadelphia Union	Kansas City, Kansas
19:30 CDT	Peterson 40'; Sinovic (yellow card) 50'; Joseph (yellow card) 58'; Sapong 82'	Report	Okugo (yellow card) 3'; Hoppenot 53'	Stadium: Livestrong Sporting Park; Attendance: 19,428; Referee: Ismail Elfath

==== MLS Cup Playoffs ====
November 4, 2012 Conference Semifinal; 1st Leg	Houston Dynamo	2–0	Sporting Kansas City	Houston, Texas
14:30 CDT	Moffat 18'; Carr (yellow card) 27'; Sarkodie (yellow card) 74'; Bruin 75'	Report	Kamara (yellow card) 42'	Stadium: BBVA Compass Stadium; Attendance: 20,689; Referee: Edwin Jurisevic

November 7, 2012 Conference Semifinal; 2nd Leg	Sporting Kansas City	1–0 (1–2 agg.)	Houston Dynamo	Kansas City, Kansas
20:00 CDT	Zusi (yellow card) 26'; Myers (yellow card) 56'; Sinovic 64'	Report	García (yellow card) 41'; Ashe (yellow card) 84'	Stadium: Livestrong Sporting Park; Attendance: 20,894; Referee: Allen Chapman

Houston Dynamo won 2–1 on aggregate

== U.S. Open Cup ==
May 29, 2012 Third round	Sporting Kansas City	3–2	Orlando City	Kansas City, Kansas
19:30 CDT	Collin (yellow card) 23'; Nagamura 45+2'; Saad 65', 69'; Peterson (yellow card) 78'	Report	Valentino (yellow card) 51'; Molino 55'; Pulis (red card) 70'; Chin 84'	Stadium: Livestrong Sporting Park; Attendance: 12,217

June 5, 2012 Fourth round	Sporting Kansas City	2–0	Colorado Rapids	Kansas City, Kansas
19:30 CDT	Collin (yellow card) 14'; Pickens 27' (o.g.); César (yellow card) 33'; Bunbury 79'	Report	Larentowicz (yellow card) 58'; Freeman (yellow card) 85'; LaBauex (yellow card) 88'	Stadium: Livestrong Sporting Park; Attendance: 14,868

June 26, 2012 Quarterfinals	Sporting Kansas City	3–0	Dayton Dutch Lions	Kansas City, Kansas
19:30 CDT	Sapong 5', 59'; Zusi 56'	Report		Stadium: Livestrong Sporting Park; Attendance: 15,167

July 11, 2012 Semifinals	Philadelphia Union	0–2	Sporting Kansas City	Chester, Pennsylvania
18:30 CDT	G. Farfan (yellow card) 30'; M. Farfan (yellow card) 52'; Lahoud (yellow card) 57'; Williams (yellow card) 62'	Report	Nagamura (yellow card) 52'; Peterson 65'; Collin (yellow card) 77'; Zusi 90+'	Stadium: PPL Park; Attendance: 8,486

August 8, 2012 Final	Sporting Kansas City	1–1 (a.e.t.) (3–2 p)	Seattle Sounders FC	Kansas City, Kansas
20:00 PM CDT	Kamara 83' (pen.)	Report	Alonso (yellow card) 4'; Rosales (yellow card) 57'; Ianni (yellow card) 73' (red card) 119'; Scott 86' (yellow card) 93'	Stadium: Livestrong Sporting Park; Attendance: 18,863; Referee: Ricardo Salazar
	Penalties
	Kamara (penalty scored); Espinoza (penalty missed); Besler (penalty scored); Zusi (penalty missed); Nagamura (penalty scored)		(penalty scored) Evans; (penalty scored) Burch; (penalty missed) Alonso; (penalty missed) Tiffert; (penalty missed) Johnson

== Friendly Matches ==
July 24, 2012	Sporting Kansas City	0–3	Montpellier HSC	Kansas City, Kansas
19:30 CDT		Report	Charbonnier 39'; Stambouli (yellow card) 44'; Herrara 72' 92+'	Stadium: Livestrong Sporting Park; Attendance: 14,769

August 1, 2012	Sporting Kansas City	1–1	Stoke City F.C.	Kansas City, Kansas
19:30 CDT	Thomas (yellow card) 88'; Miller 92+'	Report	Tonge 84' (pen.)	Stadium: Livestrong Sporting Park; Attendance: 16,197

== Recognition ==
=== AT&T Goal of the Week ===
Week	Player
Week 12	(United States) C. J. Sapong
Weeks 13–15	(Brazil) Júlio César

=== MLS Save of the Week ===
Week	Player
Week 7	(Denmark) Jimmy Nielsen
Weeks 13–15	(Denmark) Jimmy Nielsen
Week 18	(Denmark) Jimmy Nielsen
Week 19	(Denmark) Jimmy Nielsen
Week 31	(Denmark) Jimmy Nielsen
Week 32	(Denmark) Jimmy Nielsen

=== MLS All-Stars 2012 ===
Position	Player	Note
DF	(France) Aurélien Collin	First XI
GK	(Denmark) Jimmy Nielsen	First XI
MF	(United States) Graham Zusi	First XI

=== 2012 Team Awards ===
Player(s)	Award
(Denmark) Jimmy Nielsen (United States) Graham Zusi	Sporting Kansas City 2012 Most Valuable Players
(Sierra Leone) Kei Kamara	Sporting Kansas City 2012 Offensive Player of the Year
(United States) Matt Besler	Sporting Kansas City 2012 Defensive Player of the Year
(Sierra Leone) Kei Kamara	Sporting Kansas City 2012 Humanitarian of the Year
(United States) Paul Dean	2012 Bob Gansler Award (Most Outstanding Academy Player)
(Sierra Leone) Kei Kamara	Sporting Kansas City 2012 Budweiser Golden Boot

== Miscellany ==
=== Allocation ranking ===
Sporting Kansas City is in the #14 position in the MLS Allocation Ranking. The allocation ranking is the mechanism used to determine which MLS club has first priority to acquire a U.S. National Team player who signs with MLS after playing abroad, or a former MLS player who returns to the league after having gone to a club abroad for a transfer fee. A ranking can be traded, provided that part of the compensation received in return is another club's ranking.

=== International roster slots ===
Sporting Kansas City has 7 MLS International Roster Slots for use in the 2012 season. Each club in Major League Soccer is allocated 8 international roster spots. Sporting Kansas City traded one slot to San Jose Earthquakes for the 2012 season only.

=== Future draft pick trades ===
Future picks acquired: * 2013 MLS SuperDraft Round 2 pick acquired from New York Red Bulls.
Future picks traded: None.

=== MLS rights to other players ===
It is believed that Sporting maintains the MLS rights to Herculez Gomez after the player declined a contract offer by the club and instead signed with a non-MLS side on a free transfer.
