= Dickson Field =

- IATA: none; ICAO: none; FAA LID: 75WT

Summary
- Airport type: Private
- Owner/Operator: Robert Dickson
- Serves: Okanogan County
- Location: Oroville, Washington, United States
- Elevation AMSL: 3,214 ft / 980 m
- Coordinates: 48°59′3″N 119°17′54″W

Map
- Location of the airport's state, Washington, United States

Runways
Direction	Length		Surface
Direction	ft	m	Surface
17/35	500	152	Turf
- Source: Federal Aviation Administration

Dickson Field (FAA LID: 75WT) is a private airport located 7 miles (11 km) east of Oroville, Washington, which is a city in the Okanogan region of United States. It provides private general aviation services and has a 500 by 40 ft (152 by 12 m) runway numbered 17–35, but the nearby Dorothy Scott Airport handles most of the city's aviation services.

== History ==
It is owned and operated by Robert Dickson, serving the Okanogan area itself. As it is a private airport, permission is required prior to landing at the Dickson Field. Rights for permanent public use of the Dickson Field were approved in January 2007. The airport obtained no passengers in 2011.

No accidents or incidents have occurred at the Dickson Field throughout its history. Dorothy Scott Airport, a public airport situated in the same city, is generally used for the city's public aviation services, having been classified as an airport of entry by the Federal Aviation Administration.

== Facilities ==
The airport is 48°59′3″N 119°17′54″W off of 9 Mile Road and Crowsnest Highway. The airport maintains no facilities or services, and is generally used for private general aviation services. Its airfield has a 500 by 40 ft (152 by 12 m) runway numbered 17–35. The nearest radio navigation aids from the airport that help the pilot are located in three cities: Omak, Penticton, Naramata.

== See also ==
- List of airports in Washington (state)
