= Cascade and Columbia River Railroad =

Class III railroad in Washington State

Overview
- Headquarters: Omak, Washington
- Reporting mark: CSCD
- Dates of operation: 1996–present

Technical
- Track gauge: 4 ft 8 1/2 in (1,435 mm) standard gauge
- Length: 131 miles (211 km)

Other
- Website: https://www.gwrr.com/cscd/

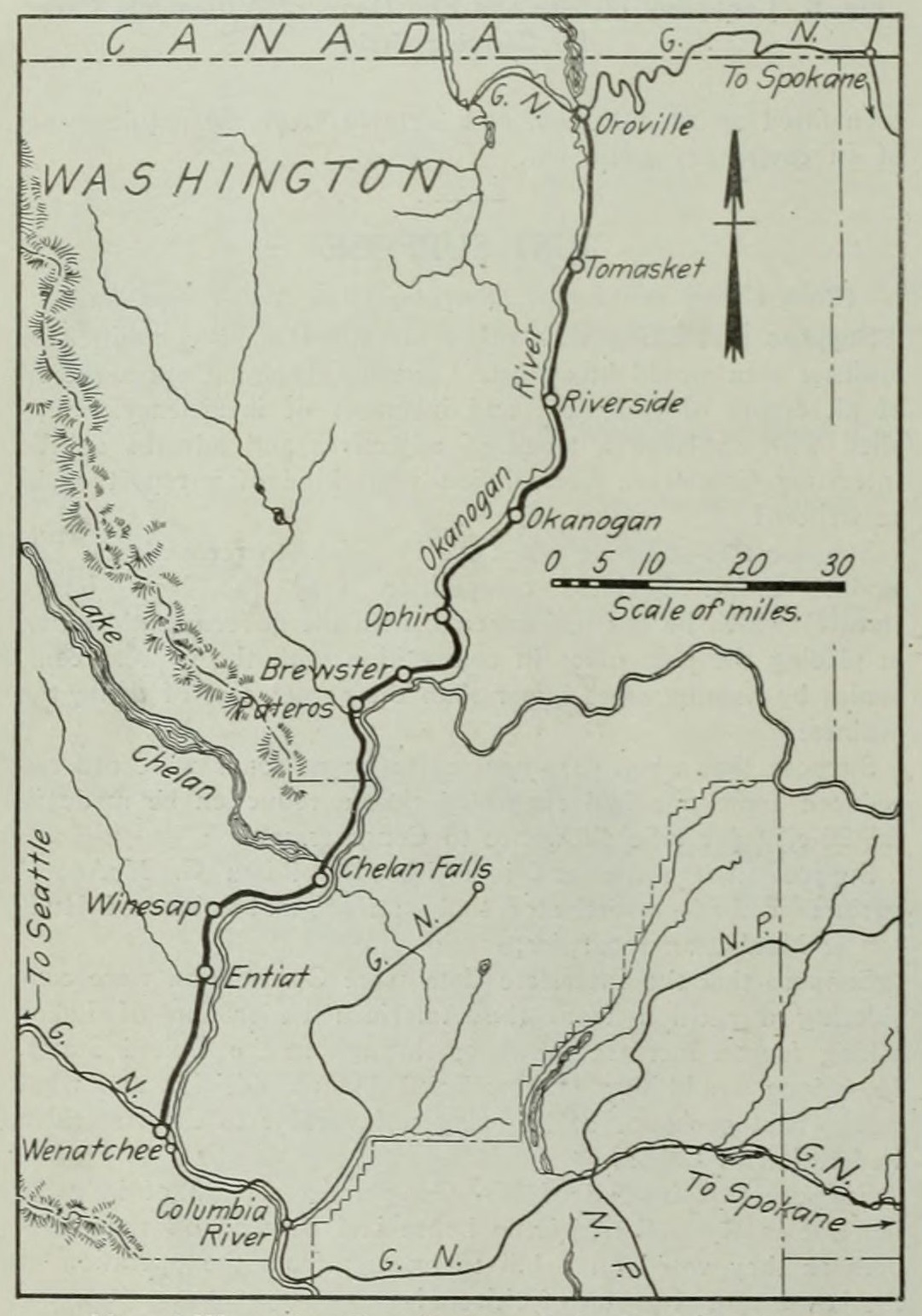
1914 map of the route of the Great Northern line from Oroville to Wenatchee

The Cascade and Columbia River Railroad (reporting mark CSCD) is a short line railroad that interchanges with BNSF Railway in Wenatchee, Washington, and runs north to Oroville.

The line from Wenatchee to Oroville was built in 1914 by the Great Northern Railway to link the main line at Wenatchee to a line Great Northern had built under the Vancouver, Victoria and Eastern Railway (VV&E) charter in British Columbia (Canada), and the Washington and Great Northern Railway (W&GN) charter for Washington (US). This line was originally the Molson–Oroville-Keremeos branch of the Spokane Falls and Northern Railway completed in 1907 which was owned by GN at the time of completion.

The former Burlington Northern W-O Branch was purchased by the RailAmerica Corporation in September 1996. Genesee & Wyoming later acquired the railroad in late 2012.

The railroad line follows the Columbia River Valley north from Wenatchee to the Okanogan River Valley and north to Oroville, just north of where the Similkameen River joins the Okanogan River.

Commodities hauled on the railroad consist mainly of timber products, as well as limestone. CSCD moved around 5,200 carloads in 2008.
