= Jon Kempin =

American soccer player (born 1993)

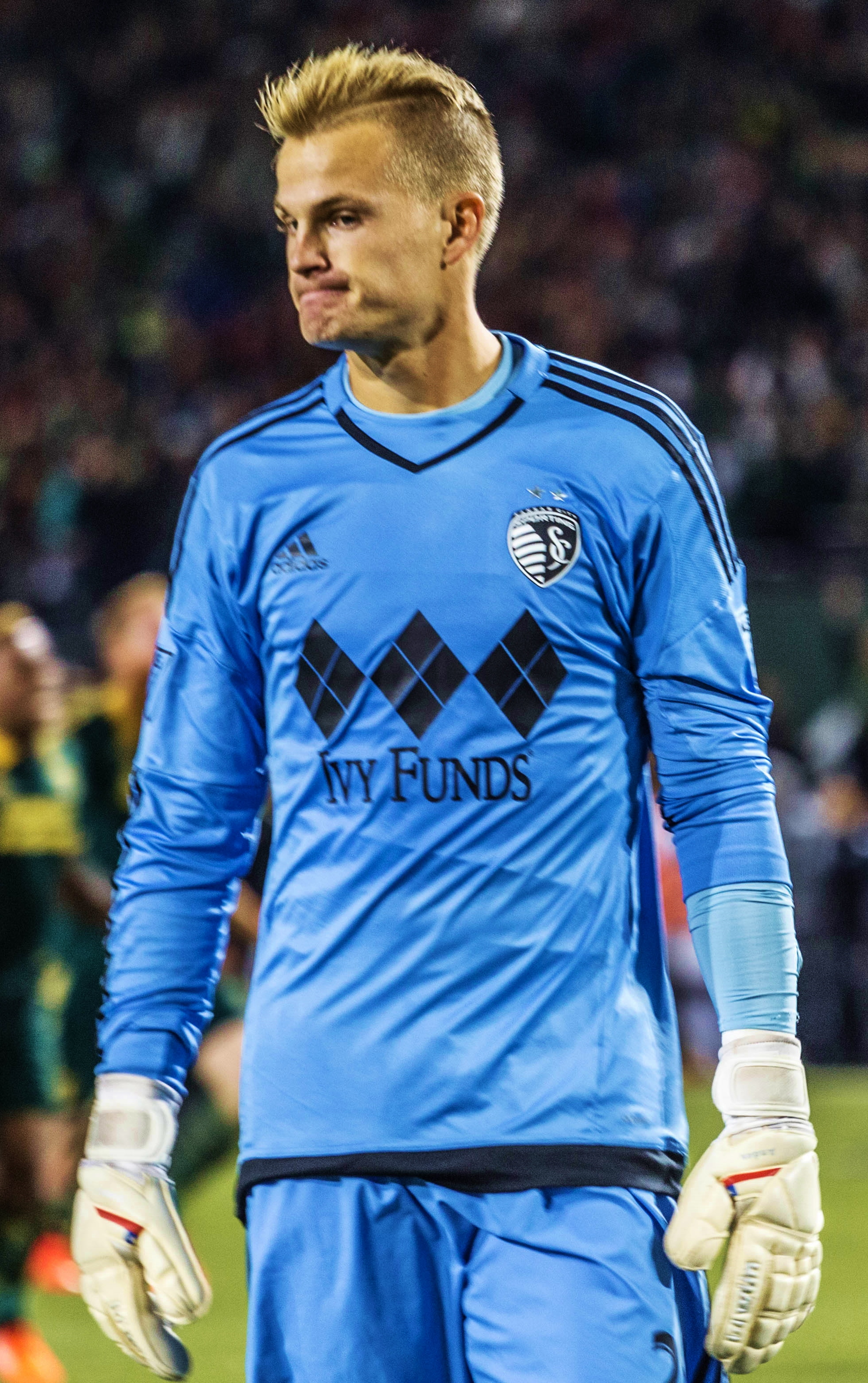
- Kempin with Sporting Kansas City in 2015

Personal information
- Full name: Jonathan Kempin
- Date of birth: April 8, 1993 (age 33)
- Place of birth: Leawood, Kansas, United States
- Height: 6 ft 1 in (1.85 m)
- Position: Goalkeeper

Youth career
- KC Legends
- Blue Valley Stars
- KCFC Alliance
- 2008–2010: Kansas City Wizards

Senior career*
Years	Team	Apps	(Gls)
2010–2016	Sporting Kansas City	7	(0)
2013	→ Orlando City (loan)	9	(0)
2014	→ OKC Energy (loan)	13	(0)
2015	→ San Antonio Scorpions (loan)	2	(0)
2016	→ Swope Park Rangers (loan)	12	(0)
2017	LA Galaxy	7	(0)
2017	→ LA Galaxy II (loan)	6	(0)
2018–2020	Columbus Crew SC	8	(0)
2019	→ Hartford Athletic (loan)	2	(0)
2020	→ San Diego Loyal (loan)	11	(0)
2021–2022	D.C. United	12	(0)
2022	→ Loudoun United (loan)	1	(0)
2022	→ San Diego Loyal (loan)	1	(0)

International career^{‡}
2010–2011	United States U18	5	(0)
2010–2013	United States U20	3	(0)
2015	United States U23	1	(0)
- * Club domestic league appearances and goals as of November 14, 2022 ‡ National team caps and goals as of November 11, 2015

Jonathan Kempin (born April 8, 1993) is an American former professional soccer player who played as a goalkeeper. He previously appeared for Sporting Kansas City (SKC), LA Galaxy, Columbus Crew SC, and D.C. United and spent time on loan with Orlando City, OKC Energy, San Antonio Scorpions, Swope Park Rangers, LA Galaxy II, Hartford Athletic, San Diego Loyal, and Loudoun United.

Kempin was born in Leawood, Kansas and attended Blue Valley North High School, winning a state title as a freshman and being inducted into the school's Athletic Hall of Fame in 2017. He played club soccer in the Kansas City Wizards system, climbing through the club's academy setup before signing for the first team as a homegrown player in August 2010. Kempin made his debut for the renamed Sporting Kansas City in May 2012, going on to appear 12 times for the team in seven seasons. Kempin spent four spells on loan while with SKC, winning a USL Pro championship with Orlando City and also spending time with OKC Energy, San Antonio Scorpions, and Swope Park Rangers. After being released by Sporting KC, he spent a year in the LA Galaxy organization before joining Columbus Crew SC ahead of the 2018 season.

Kempin represented the United States from under-14 to under-23 level. He was a part of the under-17 residency program at the IMG Soccer Academy while in high school and represented the under-18, under-20, and under-23 teams in competitive matches. Kempin earned his only senior call-up in January 2015.

== Early life ==
Born in Leawood, Kansas, Kempin played club soccer for the KC Legends, Blue Valley Stars, and KCFC Alliance youth teams. He attended Blue Valley North High School in Overland Park, winning a state title and allowing just two goals as a freshman. He was selected to take part in the United States U17 residency program at the IMG Soccer Academy, where he spent his sophomore year. After one season in the residency program, Kempin returned to Kansas and joined the Kansas City Wizards Academy in the U.S. Soccer Development Academy. As a junior at Blue Valley North, he was named as the Kansas State Player of the Year and as a Parade All-American. In 2017, Kempin was inducted into the Blue Valley North Athletic Hall of Fame and the Kansas Soccer Hall of Fame.

== Club career ==
=== Sporting Kansas City ===
On August 31, 2010, Kempin signed with the Kansas City Wizards as the first homegrown player in club history. At 17 years old, he was the youngest player ever signed by the Wizards. Kempin did not make an appearance in his first professional season, although he was named to the bench for the club's season finale against San Jose Earthquakes. In 2011, Kempin again did not play for the Sporting Kansas City first team. He did become the club's primary goalkeeper in the MLS Reserve League, appearing several times in that competition, and was named to the substitutes' bench three times in Major League Soccer play.

In his third professional season, Kempin finally made his debut for SKC. On May 29, 2012, he started against Orlando City in the U.S. Open Cup, making six saves and helping Sporting KC claim a 3–2 victory. He was named to the bench 13 times in league play, all due to an injury to normal backup goalkeeper Eric Kronberg, but did not play outside of his lone cup appearance.

==== 2013: loan to Orlando ====
On March 14, 2013, Kempin was loaned to Orlando City, Sporting KC's USL Pro affiliate, in a bid to find regular playing time. The loan was for the duration of the 2013 season, with the club able to recall him at any time. Kempin made his Orlando debut on April 7, starting a 3–1 victory against Phoenix FC. He appeared nine times for the Lions on the year, playing for the last time in a scoreless draw with Pittsburgh Riverhounds on July 17. He did not appear in the club's playoff run, with Miguel Gallardo starting in net as Orlando claimed the USL Pro title for the second time in club history. Kempin returned to Sporting Kansas City with six games remaining in the regular season, but was unable to beat out Jimmy Nielsen or Kronberg to make a matchday squad. He watched on during the club's playoff run as SKC defeated Real Salt Lake on penalties to win MLS Cup 2013, the second league championship in club history.

==== 2014: loan to OKC ====
On March 17, 2014, Kempin was loaned to OKC Energy FC for the duration of the 2014 season. The Energy, playing their debut season in the USL Pro, were coached by Kempin's former teammate in Kansas City, Jimmy Nielsen. Although he was initially recalled by SKC before playing a game, Kempin returned to make his Energy debut on April 7, starting in a 4–2 defeat against LA Galaxy II. He appeared 13 times through the front half of the season, with that run of matches including a six-game losing streak and a six-game unbeaten run.

Kempin was recalled by Sporting KC on July 9, 2014, after Eric Kronberg fractured a bone in his left hand. He immediately stepped into the backup role behind Andy Gruenebaum, sitting on the bench in SKC's next five matches. Kempin was selected to take part in the inaugural MLS Homegrown Game, where he played the second half against Portland Timbers U23s and was named as the game's Most Valuable Player. Just five days after the Homegrown Game, Kempin stepped in to make his Major League Soccer debut; Gruenebaum went out injured against Vancouver Whitecaps FC on August 10, leaving Kempin to take over at halftime. He saved a penalty from Darren Mattocks in the 85th minute, but Sporting KC fell by a 2–0 scoreline. Kempin went on to appear in SKC's next four games, including a match against Real Estelí in CONCACAF Champions League play on August 20. Although he returned to the bench following Gruenebaum's return to health, Kempin finished the season with five appearances for Sporting Kansas City.

==== 2015: loan to San Antonio ====
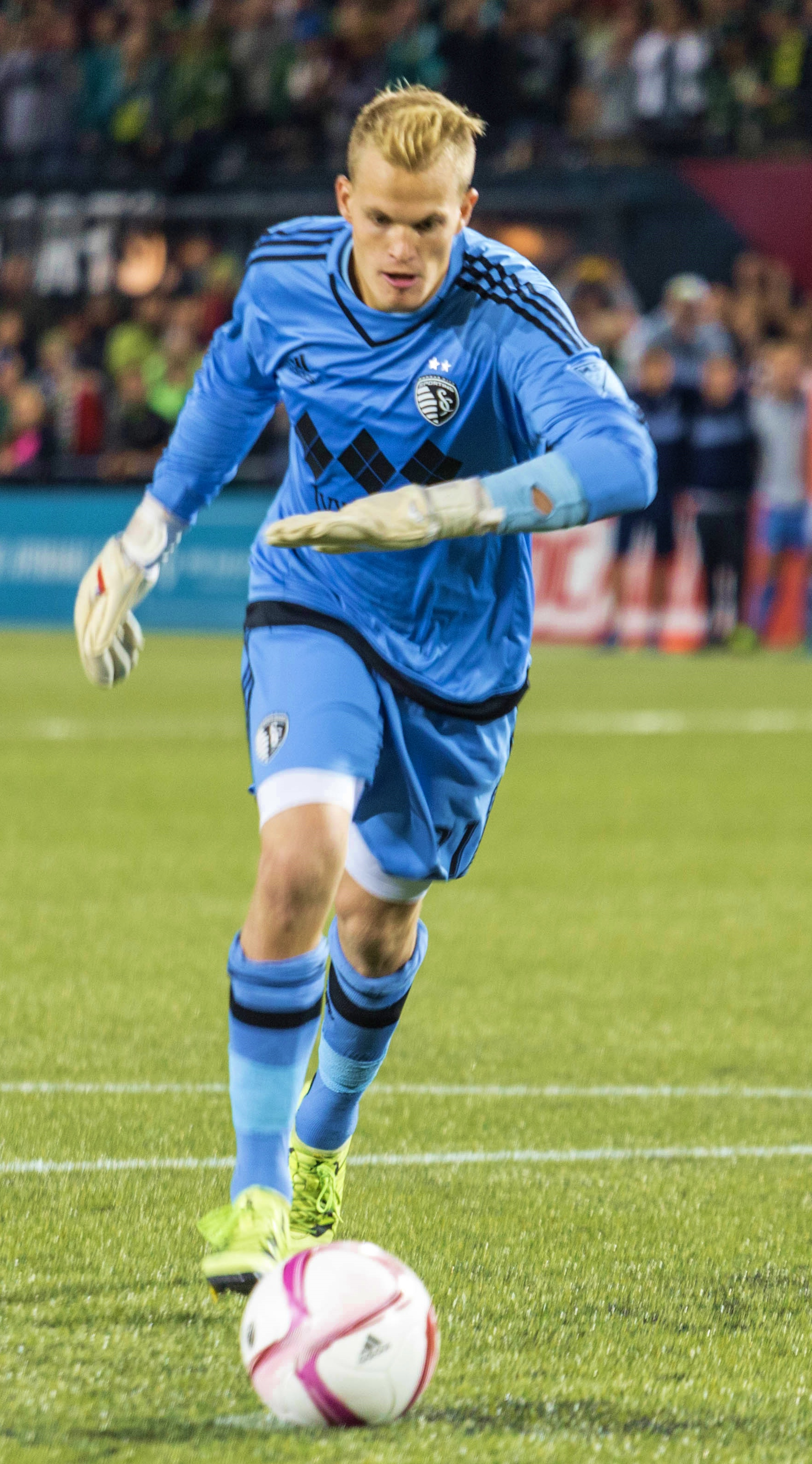
Kempin's penalty attempt was saved in the 2015 MLS Cup Playoffs against Portland Timbers.

On March 20, 2015, Kempin was again sent on loan, this time joining North American Soccer League club San Antonio Scorpions for the duration of the 2015 season. SKC manager Peter Vermes said that Kempin was headed to San Antonio, instead of affiliate club OKC Energy, because "[he] has the ability to go in and be the number one right away in San Antonio." He started each of the Scorpions' first two matches on the year, conceding five total goals in defeats against Tampa Bay Rowdies on April 4 and Indy Eleven on April 18.

After Luis Marín terminated his contract with the club, Kempin was recalled to Sporting Kansas City on May 27, 2015. He spent the majority of the season backing up Tim Melia, but did appear three times in a four-match stretch in August. Kempin's only other appearance on the year came in the knockout round of the 2015 MLS Cup Playoffs, in a match that would become known as the "Double Post" game. Against eventual champions Portland Timbers, Melia suffered a head injury and had to exit the match in the 84th minute. Kempin did not concede a goal through extra time, and made three saves in the ensuing penalty shootout, but saw his kick in the 11th round saved as Portland advanced by a 7–6 scoreline. Although his contract expired at the end of the season, Kempin re-signed with Sporting KC on December 9.

==== 2016: loan to Swope Park ====
Although Kempin had been considered to be SKC's goalkeeper of the future for six years, his future with the club was thrown into doubt following the 2016 MLS SuperDraft; both Vermes and co-owner Robb Heineman said that the club wanted to draft Andrew Tarbell, and that they had viewed Tarbell as a "ten-year goalkeeper" for the club. That revelation, coupled with the selection of Alec Kann in the 2015 MLS Re-Entry Draft, meant that Kempin was again the club's number three goalkeeper. He was sent on loan to SKC's United Soccer League affiliate, Swope Park Rangers, on March 25, 2016. Kempin started the inaugural game in Swope Park history, making two saves in a 2–1 victory against Portland Timbers 2 on March 26. After mostly staying with the Rangers for the first half of the season, he spent the early part of August moving between Sporting KC and Swope Park, playing in the league while on loan and appearing on the bench for SKC. He played twice in the 2016–17 CONCACAF Champions League, with a start against Vancouver Whitecaps FC on August 23 eventually marking his 12th and final appearance with Sporting KC. Kempin had his contract option declined by the club on November 23, ending his ten-year association with the Sporting Kansas City organization. He went unselected in the 2016 MLS Re-Entry Draft.

=== LA Galaxy and loan to Galaxy II ===
After training with the club during preseason, Kempin signed with LA Galaxy on March 3, 2017. He was intended to serve as the club's number three goalkeeper, behind Brian Rowe and Clément Diop. In a bid to find playing time, Kempin was loaned to LA Galaxy II, the Galaxy's reserve team in the United Soccer League. He made his debut for Los Dos on March 25, keeping a shutout in a 2–0 victory over Whitecaps FC 2. However, with Rowe injured and Diop on international duty, Kempin made his MLS debut for the Galaxy on June 3, tallying six saves in a scoreless draw with D.C. United. Kempin appeared for Galaxy II sporadically throughout the 2017 season, playing his last of six games while on loan on August 2 against Orange County SC. On August 23, in his second start of the year for the Galaxy, he tied an MLS record by saving two penalty kicks in a match, although the Galaxy were defeated 2–0 by Columbus Crew SC. Kempin appeared in 15 games between the two teams, but the Galaxy declined his contract option on November 27.

=== Columbus Crew SC ===
On December 13, 2017, Kempin was traded to Columbus Crew SC in exchange for a fourth-round pick in the 2018 MLS SuperDraft. He stepped straight into the backup role behind Zack Steffen, appearing on the bench in each of Crew SC's first three matches. With Steffen away on international duty, Kempin made his debut for the club on March 24, 2018, starting against D.C. United. He made one save, helping Columbus to a 3–1 victory. He went on to appear four more times, finishing his first season in Columbus with five appearances; he was named to the bench an additional 31 times in all competitions. On December 9, Kempin had his contract option picked up by the club.

==== 2019: loan to Hartford ====
After not making a single appearance through the first two months of the 2019 season, Kempin was sent on loan to USL Championship club Hartford Athletic on April 11. He made his debut for the club two days later, starting a 3–1 defeat against Pittsburgh Riverhounds SC. After appearing once more for Hartford, Kempin was recalled by the Crew on April 23. He played five times in Columbus during the remainder of the season, including both of the Crew's matches in the U.S. Open Cup. At the end of the season, Kempin was named as the winner of the club's Kirk Urso Heart Award as the player that "best exemplified the qualities of a teammate and became 'the heart' of the Black & Gold’s locker room." Although his contract expired following the season, on October 21 it was announced that Kempin had signed a new contract with Columbus and would return to the Crew in 2020.

==== 2020: loan to San Diego ====
The Crew acquired two goalkeepers ahead of the 2020 season, and in a bid for playing time Kempin was subsequently loaned out, joining USL Championship expansion side San Diego Loyal on March 6. Kempin made his San Diego debut on March 11 in a 2–1 victory against Tacoma Defiance. He kept his place in the team after the season was paused due to the COVID-19 pandemic, starting the first four games for the Loyal after the resumption. Kempin missed time in both August and September due to injuries but finished the shortened season with 11 appearances in San Diego. Heading into the season finale against Phoenix Rising, he was leading the way for the league's Golden Glove, but lost out on the award to Danny Vitiello: the Loyal walked off the field and forfeited after Collin Martin received homophobic abuse from a Phoenix player. Kempin was credited with three goals allowed for the 3–0 forfeit. After returning to Columbus, Kempin did not make an appearance as the Crew won MLS Cup 2020. Eloy Room and Andrew Tarbell shared the starting job during the club's playoff run, and Kempin also missed the Eastern Conference final after reportedly testing positive for COVID-19.

=== D.C. United ===
On January 8, 2021, Kempin was traded to D.C. United in exchange for a third round pick in the 2021 MLS SuperDraft. He appeared to be the third goalkeeper on the depth chart at the beginning of the season, behind starter Bill Hamid and Chris Seitz. However, after an injury to Hamid and three straight losses with Seitz in net, Kempin made his club debut on May 13 and made three saves in a 1–0 victory over Chicago Fire. His longest run in the starting lineup arrived after Hamid was injured midway through a game against Columbus in August: Kempin replaced Hamid in that game and then started the next six for D.C. He finished with 10 appearances, his personal-best mark in an MLS season. At the end of the year, Kempin had his contract option declined by the club, but United confirmed that the sides remained in discussions on a new contract. He officially re-signed with D.C. on February 4, 2022. Following the 2022 season, his contract option was declined by D.C. United.

On February 26, 2023, Kempin announced his retirement from professional soccer on his personal Twitter account.

== International career ==
Before signing his first professional contract, Kempin had participated in training camps with the United States under-15 and under-18 national teams, as well as a stint in the under-17 residency program at the IMG Soccer Academy. His first competitive youth national team appearances, though, arrived at the under-20 level. In the winter of 2010, Kempin was included in the American squad for the Torneo de las Americas, playing in two matches, and the Traditional Winter Tournament in Israel, where he played twice more. He returned to the under-18 setup in 2011, representing the U.S. at the Lisbon International Tournament and the Milk Cup. Kempin also earned his first call-up to the under-23 national team that year, sitting on the bench for a friendly against Azerbaijan in November. After more than a year out of the youth national teams, Kempin returned to the under-20s in January 2013. In a friendly against Panama, he replaced Kendall McIntosh at halftime and conceded both goals in a 2–1 defeat. He again earned just one call-up in 2014, taking part in the first-ever training camp for the under-21 national team.

In January 2015, Kempin earned his first call-up to the United States senior national team, with head coach Jürgen Klinsmann including the then-21-year-old as one of four goalkeepers in the squad for a pair of friendlies. However, Kempin did not appear in either match during the camp, with Nick Rimando and Sean Johnson splitting the minutes. That November, Kempin made his under-23 debut and earned his final youth national team cap in a friendly against Brazil. He replaced Charlie Horton and played 45 minutes in a 2–1 defeat.

== Personal life ==
Kempin is one of three children to his parents, Julie and Vance. He played baseball and basketball as well as soccer while growing up, with his father coaching him in baseball.

After signing with Sporting Kansas City, Kempin took college classes at Johnson County Community College. He later earned his Bachelor and Master of Business Administration degrees from Southern New Hampshire University, part of a program between the university and Major League Soccer to help players complete their degrees while playing.

Outside of soccer, Kempin is a licensed real estate agent at ReeceNichols, following his mother and grandmother in the profession. Kempin joined the Sporting KC radio broadcast team as an analyst for the 2024 season.

== Career statistics ==
As of June 11, 2022

Appearances and goals by club, season and competition
Club	Season	League			Cup (Note: All appearances in the U.S. Open Cup)		Continental		Other		Total	
Club	Season	Division	Apps	Goals	Apps	Goals	Apps	Goals	Apps	Goals	Apps	Goals
Sporting Kansas City	2010	Major League Soccer	0	0	0	0	—		—		0	0
Sporting Kansas City	2011	Major League Soccer	0	0	0	0	—		0	0	0	0
Sporting Kansas City	2012	Major League Soccer	0	0	1	0	—		0	0	1	0
Sporting Kansas City	2013	Major League Soccer	0	0	0	0	0	0	0	0	0	0
Sporting Kansas City	2014	Major League Soccer	4	0	0	0	1 (Note: Appearance(s) in the CONCACAF Champions League)	0	0	0	5	0
Sporting Kansas City	2015	Major League Soccer	3	0	0	0	—		1 (Note: Appearance in the MLS Cup Playoffs)	0	4	0
Sporting Kansas City	2016	Major League Soccer	0	0	0	0	2	0	0	0	2	0
Sporting Kansas City	Total		7	0	1	0	3	0	1	0	12	0
Orlando City (loan)	2013	USL Pro	9	0	0	0	—		0	0	9	0
OKC Energy (loan)	2014	USL Pro	13	0	0	0	—		—		13	0
San Antonio Scorpions (loan)	2015	NASL	2	0	0	0	—		—		2	0
Swope Park Rangers (loan)	2016	USL	12	0	—		—		0	0	12	0
LA Galaxy	2017	Major League Soccer	7	0	2	0	—		—		9	0
LA Galaxy II (loan)	2017	USL	6	0	—		—		—		6	0
Columbus Crew SC	2018	Major League Soccer	5	0	0	0	—		0	0	5	0
Columbus Crew SC	2019	Major League Soccer	3	0	2	0	—		—		5	0
Columbus Crew SC	2020	Major League Soccer	0	0	—		—		0	0	0	0
Columbus Crew SC	Total		8	0	2	0	0	0	0	0	10	0
Hartford Athletic (loan)	2019	USL Championship	2	0	0	0	—		—		2	0
San Diego Loyal (loan)	2020	USL Championship	11	0	—		—		—		11	0
D.C. United	2021	Major League Soccer	10	0	—		—		—		10	0
D.C. United	2022	Major League Soccer	2	0	1	0	—		—		3	0
D.C. United	Total		12	0	1	0	0	0	0	0	13	0
Loudoun United (loan)	2022	USL Championship	1	0	—		—		—		1	0
San Diego Loyal (loan)	2022	USL Championship	1	0	0	0	—		0	0	1	0
Career total			91	0	6	0	3	0	1	0	101	0

== Honors ==
Sporting Kansas City

- MLS Cup: 2013
- U.S. Open Cup: 2012, 2015

Orlando City

- USL Cup: 2013

Columbus Crew SC

- MLS Cup: 2020

Individual

- Kansas State Player of the Year: 2009
- Parade Boys' Soccer High School All-American: 2009
- MLS Homegrown Game Most Valuable Player: 2014
- Blue Valley North High School Athletic Hall of Fame: 2017
- Kansas Soccer Hall of Fame: 2017
- Kirk Urso Heart Award: 2019

== See also ==
- All-time Columbus Crew roster
- All-time D.C. United roster
- All-time Orlando City SC (2010–2014) roster
- All-time Sporting Kansas City roster
- List of people from Leawood, Kansas
