= Mikey Lopez =

American soccer player (born 1993)

Personal information
- Full name: Miguel Angel Lopez Jr.
- Date of birth: February 20, 1993 (age 33)
- Place of birth: Mission, Texas, United States
- Height: 5 ft 8 in (1.73 m)
- Positions: Left-back; midfielder

Team information
- Current team: Portland Hearts of Pine
- Number: 5

College career
Years	Team	Apps	(Gls)
2011–2012	North Carolina Tar Heels	46	(5)

Senior career*
Years	Team	Apps	(Gls)
2011	Orange County Blue Star	1	(0)
2013–2015	Sporting Kansas City	14	(0)
2014	→ Orlando City (loan)	9	(0)
2014	→ Oklahoma City Energy (loan)	5	(2)
2015	→ Oklahoma City Energy (loan)	8	(0)
2016–2017	New York City FC	27	(0)
2018	San Antonio FC	31	(3)
2019–2024	Birmingham Legion	119	(6)
2025–2026	Portland Hearts of Pine	46	(2)

International career^{‡}
2012–2013	United States U20	17	(0)
Medal record
Representing United States
Runner-up	CONCACAF U-20 Championship	2013
- * Club domestic league appearances and goals as of October 25, 2026 ‡ National team caps and goals as of June 6, 2013

Miguel Angel "Mikey" Lopez Jr. (born February 20, 1993) is an American former professional soccer player who played as a left-back and center midfielder. He played for, among others, Sporting Kansas City, New York City FC, San Antonio FC, Birmingham Legion FC, and Portland Hearts of Pine.

== Career ==
=== College and amateur ===
Born in Dallas, Texas, Lopez attended St. Stephen's in Austin, Texas, and the school's Soccer Academy starting in eighth grade Lopez then attended the University of North Carolina at Chapel Hill for which he played for the university's soccer team, the North Carolina Tar Heels. While playing with the Tar Heels Lopez led his team to the 2011 NCAA Division I Men's Soccer Championship in which the Tar Heels won against the Charlotte 49ers and he was named the ACC Freshman Player of the Year. Overall in two seasons with the Tar Heels, Lopez scored five goals and notched up five assists.

Lopez also made one appearance for USL Premier Development League club Orange County Blue Star in 2011.

=== Sporting Kansas City ===
On January 17, 2013, Lopez was selected as the 14th overall draft pick by Sporting Kansas City in the 2013 MLS SuperDraft. Lopez made his debut for Sporting KC in a 2–0 win over the Des Moines Menace in the 2013 Lamar Hunt U.S. Open Cup third round on May 29, 2013.

==== Orlando City (loan) ====
On March 17, 2014, it was announced that Lopez would join Sporting USL Pro affiliate Orlando City on loan for the entire season. He made his debut for Orlando City on April 5, 2014.

==== OKC Energy (loan) ====
In early June 2014, Sporting Kansas City transferred Lopez's loan contract to Oklahoma City Energy FC, where he earned immediate playing time.

=== New York City FC ===
On January 26, 2016, New York City FC announced the signing of Lopez. He made his debut on March 6, 2016, replacing Tony Taylor in the 69th minute of a 4–3 win over Chicago. Lopez was released by New York at the end of the 2017 season.

=== San Antonio ===
On January 26, 2018, Lopez signed with USL Championship side San Antonio FC for the 2018 season.

=== Birmingham Legion ===
On November 13, 2018, it was announced that Lopez would join Birmingham Legion ahead of their debut USL Championship season. He left Birmingham following their 2024 season.

=== Portland Hearts of Pine ===
On December 28, 2024, the Portland Hearts of Pine of USL League One announced that Lopez would join the club ahead of their inaugural season. He is the team's captain. He was named the league's Comeback Player of the Year for the 2025 season. He scored his first goal for the Hearts of Pine in a 3–2 comeback win over FC Naples July 3, 2026. He announced his retirement ahead of the club's final match of the 2026, in which he scored a goal.

== International ==
Lopez was born in Dallas to Mexican parents. Lopez was first called into the United States U20 national team in February 2013 and was a member of the squad that finished second at the 2013 CONCACAF U-20 Championship.

== Career statistics ==
As of October 5, 2019

Club	Season	League			Playoffs (Note: Appearance in the MLS Cup Playoffs)		Cup		Continental		Total	
Club	Season	Division	Apps	Goals	Apps	Goals	Apps	Goals	Apps	Goals	Apps	Goals
Orange County Blue Star	2011	PDL	1	0	–		–		–		1	0
Sporting Kansas City	2013	MLS	0	0	–		1	0	–		1	0
Sporting Kansas City	2014	MLS	8	0	–		–		–		8	0
Sporting Kansas City	2015	MLS	6	0	–		–		–		6	0
Sporting Kansas City	Total		14	0	0	0	1	0	0	0	15	0
Orlando City (loan)	2014	USL	9	0	–		–		–		9	0
OKC Energy (loan)	2014	USL	5	2	–		–		–		5	2
OKC Energy (loan)	2015	USL	8	0	–		–		–		8	0
OKC Energy (loan)	Total		13	2	0	0	0	0	0	0	13	2
New York City FC	2016	MLS	15	0	1	0	1	0	–		17	0
New York City FC	2017	MLS	12	0	–		1	0	–		13	0
New York City FC	Total		27	0	1	0	2	0	0	0	30	0
San Antonio FC	2018	USL	31	3	–		3	1	–		34	4
Birmingham Legion	2019	USL Championship	26	3	–		–		–		26	3
Career total			121	8	1	0	6	1	0	0	128	9

=== Honors ===
==== Portland Hearts of Pine ====
- USL League One Comeback Player of the Year: 2025
