= Oroville, Washington =

City in Washington, United States

Oroville
- City
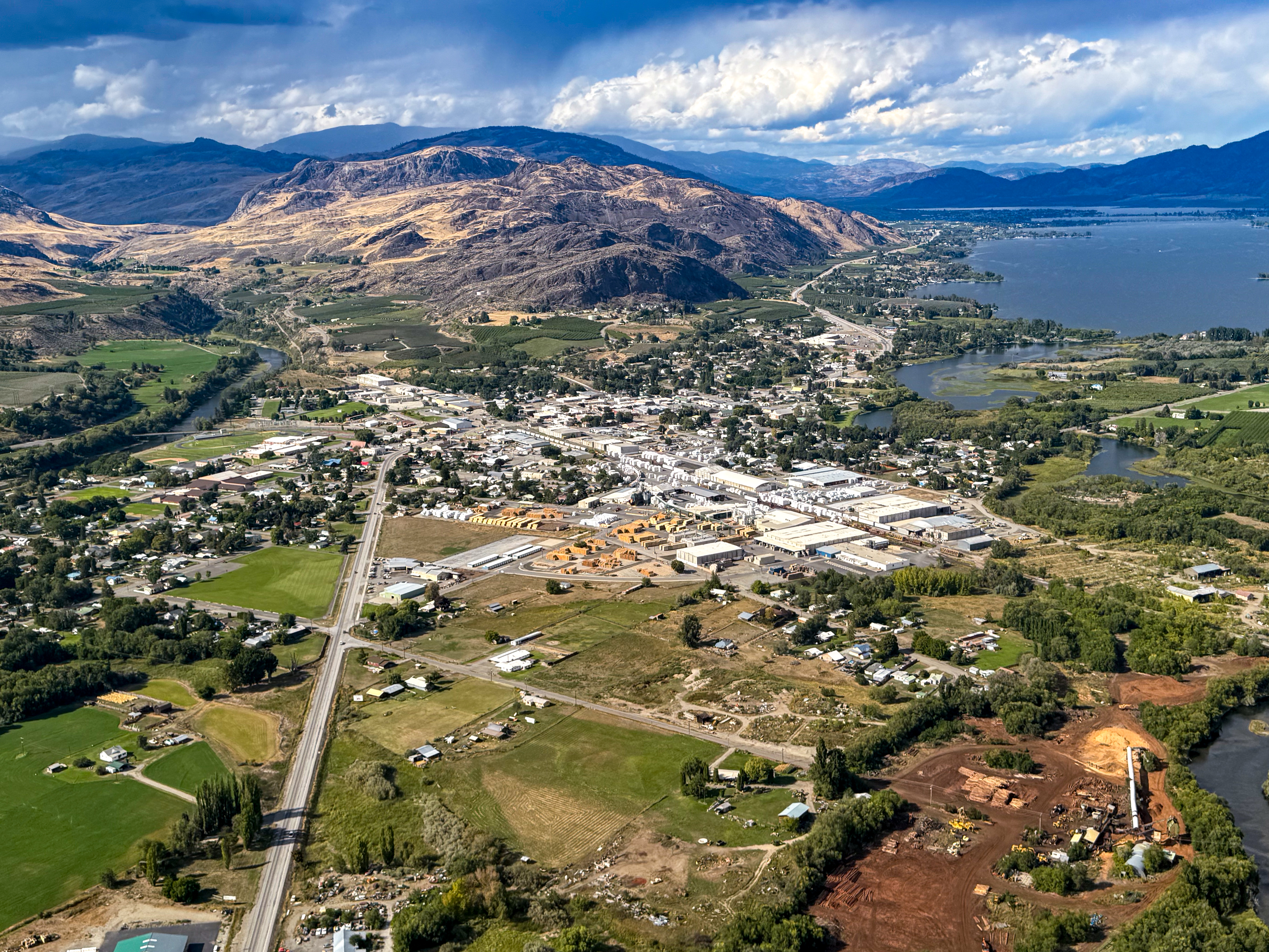
- View of Oroville, Washington and Osoyoos Lake, looking north towards Canada.

- Flag

- Location of Oroville in Okanogan County, Washington

- Location in the United States
- Coordinates: 48°56′31″N 119°25′49″W
- Country: United States
- State: Washington
- County: Okanogan
- Established: January 1, 1892
- Incorporated: August 7, 1908

Government
  - Type: Mayor–council
  - Mayor: Ed Naillon
  - Governing body: Oroville City Council

Area
  - Total: 1.85 sq mi (4.78 km^{2})
  - Land: 1.69 sq mi (4.38 km^{2})
  - Water: 0.15 sq mi (0.40 km^{2})
- Elevation: 912 ft (278 m)

Population (2020)
  - Total: 1,795
  - Density: 1,060/sq mi (410/km^{2})
- Time zone: UTC-8 (PST)
  - Summer (DST): UTC-7 (PDT)
- ZIP codes: 98844
- Area code: 509
- FIPS code: 53-51970
- GNIS feature ID: 2411338
- Website: City of Oroville

Oroville is a city located in the northern bulk of the Okanogan Highlands in north-central Washington, United States. Oroville is a member municipality of Okanogan County, Washington situated between Omak and Penticton. The population was 1,795 at the 2020 census.

== History ==
Oroville was first settled by European settlers in the late 1850s and known as 'rag town.' The settlement was named Oro, after the Spanish word for gold, in 1892 after the surrounding gold mines and in an attempt to attract prospectors and merchants. The Post Office objected to the name "Oro" because a town was already named "Oso" in Washington, so the name was changed to Oroville, in 1909. Oroville was a stop along the Spokane Falls and Northern Railway line from British Columbia to Spokane, via Molson and Chesaw. In 1914 a third branch south to Wenatchee was constructed to avoid the steep inclines on the original Spokane track.

Passenger train service to Oroville was operated by the Great Northern Railway until July 14, 1953, with freight operations continuing later.

Oroville started to become a tourist location in the mid-2000s, large condo developments were proposed. After peaking in 2005–07, the city's economy has suffered since the Great Recession of 2008. Oroville is home to the Dorothy Scott Airport, an international municipal airport with U.S. Customs check, located two miles outside of the town center. The airport opened in August 1937.

== Geography ==
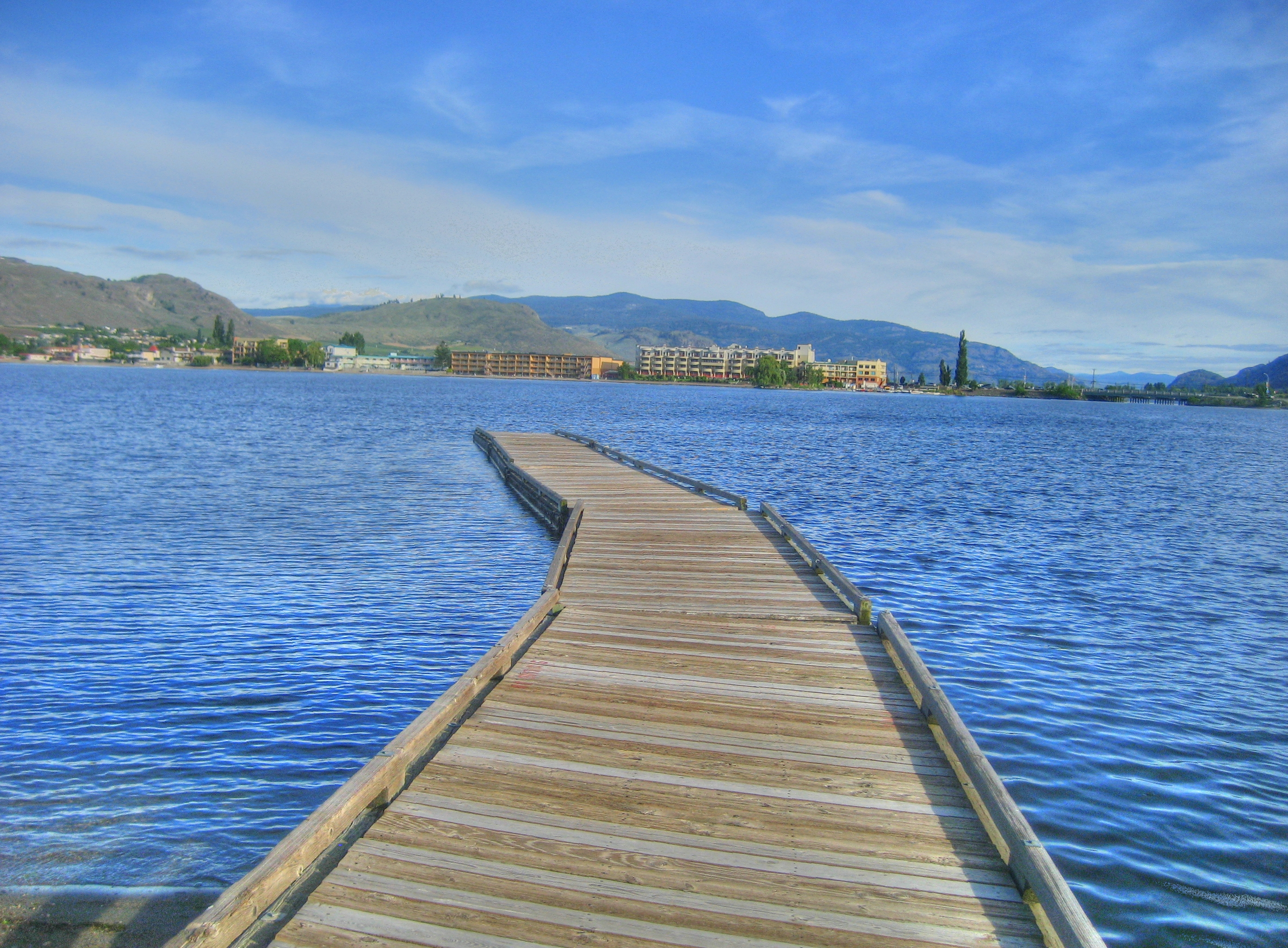
The townsite of Osoyoos Lake within the northern Okanogan Highlands in Oroville, Washington

Oroville is located 4 miles (6.4 km) south of the Canada–US border, and features an official crossing into Osoyoos, British Columbia. It is located at the south end of Osoyoos Lake, which empties into the Okanogan River on the east side of the town; the town is bound to the west by the Similkameen River. U.S. Route 97 runs through Oroville.

According to the United States Census Bureau, the city has a total area of 1.68 square miles (4.35 km^{2}), of which, 1.64 square miles (4.25 km^{2}) is land and 0.04 square miles (0.10 km^{2}) is water.

=== Climate ===
Oroville lies in a climatic region that is typified by large seasonal temperature differences, with warm to hot summers and moderately cold winters. According to the Köppen climate classification system, Oroville has a humid continental climate, Dfb on climate maps.

== Economy ==
Most of the economy of Oroville and the surrounding areas is based on agriculture. Numerous orchards and a few grape vineyards are within the town limits. During Oroville's heyday as a mining town, many saloons, restaurants, shops, and a drive-in movie theater were there. Today, the town's economy is depressed with a nearly 30% poverty rate and a median household income of only $22,000. Recently, three vacation cottage developments have been built, two east of Lake Osoyoos, Sandalia, and the Veranda Beach Resort, and one just north of downtown, Sonora Shores.

The city is home to a weekly newspaper, the Okanogan Valley Gazette-Tribune, established in 1905 as the Oroville Weekly Gazette. Okanogan Living, a monthly lifestyle magazine based in Tonasket, also serves the region.

Oroville is the northern terminus of the Cascade and Columbia River Railroad, a short line railroad owned by Genesee & Wyoming.

== Demographics ==
Historical population
Census	Pop.	Note	%±
1910	495		—
1920	1,013		104.6%
1930	800		−21.0%
1940	1,206		50.8%
1950	1,500		24.4%
1960	1,437		−4.2%
1970	1,555		8.2%
1980	1,483		−4.6%
1990	1,505		1.5%
2000	1,653		9.8%
2010	1,686		2.0%
2020	1,795		6.5%
U.S. Decennial Census; 2020 Census

=== 2020 census ===
As of the 2020 census, Oroville had a population of 1,795. The median age was 40.7 years. 21.4% of residents were under the age of 18 and 20.8% of residents were 65 years of age or older. For every 100 females there were 107.0 males, and for every 100 females age 18 and over there were 102.6 males age 18 and over.

0.0% of residents lived in urban areas, while 100.0% lived in rural areas.

There were 720 households in Oroville, of which 26.8% had children under the age of 18 living in them. Of all households, 38.5% were married-couple households, 20.6% were households with a male householder and no spouse or partner present, and 33.3% were households with a female householder and no spouse or partner present. About 35.7% of all households were made up of individuals and 19.7% had someone living alone who was 65 years of age or older.

There were 820 housing units, of which 12.2% were vacant. The homeowner vacancy rate was 3.5% and the rental vacancy rate was 5.8%.

Racial composition as of the 2020 census
Race	Number	Percent
White	1,209	67.4%
Black or African American	4	0.2%
American Indian and Alaska Native	71	4.0%
Asian	14	0.8%
Native Hawaiian and Other Pacific Islander	0	0.0%
Some other race	311	17.3%
Two or more races	186	10.4%
Hispanic or Latino (of any race)	464	25.8%

=== 2010 census ===
At the 2010 census there were 1,686 people in 698 households, including 434 families, in the city. The population density was 1,028.0 inhabitants per square mile (396.9/km^{2}). There were 797 housing units at an average density of 486.0 per square mile (187.6/km^{2}). The racial makeup of the city was 78.8% White, 0.8% African American, 2.4% Native American, 1.1% Asian, 0.1% Pacific Islander, 12.7% from other races, and 4.2% from two or more races. Hispanic or Latino of any race were 21.4%.

Of the 698 households 33.1% had children under the age of 18 living with them, 45.6% were married couples living together, 10.7% had a female householder with no husband present, 5.9% had a male householder with no wife present, and 37.8% were non-families. 32.1% of households were one person and 16.3% were one person aged 65 or older. The average household size was 2.41 and the average family size was 3.03.

The median age was 39.4 years. 26.2% of residents were under the age of 18; 7.5% were between the ages of 18 and 24; 23.3% were from 25 to 44; 26.2% were from 45 to 64; and 16.7% were 65 or older. The gender makeup of the city was 49.2% male and 50.8% female.

=== 2000 census ===
At the 2000 census, there were 1,653 people, 691 households, and 433 families in the town. The population density was 1,336.5 people per square mile (514.7/km^{2}). There were 794 housing units at an average density of 642.0 per square mile (247.2/km^{2}). The racial makeup of the town was 82.34% White, 0.12% African American, 4.23% Native American, 0.30% Asian, 0.30% Pacific Islander, 9.32% from other races, and 3.39% from two or more races. Hispanic or Latino of any race were 17.06% of the population.

Of the 691 households 32.1% had children under the age of 18 living with them, 45.6% were married couples living together, 13.3% had a female householder with no husband present, and 37.2% were non-families. 32.0% of households were one person and 14.5% were one person aged 65 or older. The average household size was 2.37 and the average family size was 2.99.

The age distribution was 28.9% under the age of 18, 5.1% from 18 to 24, 25.6% from 25 to 44, 23.7% from 45 to 64, and 16.7% 65 or older. The median age was 38 years. For every 100 females, there were 94.0 males. For every 100 females age 18 and over, there were 88.3 males.

The median household income was $22,301 and the median family income was $30,114. Males had a median income of $25,833 versus $21,750 for females. The per capita income for the town was $12,220. About 22.6% of families and 28.9% of the population were below the poverty line, including 37.0% of those under age 18 and 19.5% of those age 65 or over.

Oroville
- Crime rates* (2012)

Violent crimes
- Homicide: 0
- Rape: 1
- Robbery: 0
- Aggravated assault: 1
- Total violent crime: 2

Property crimes
- Burglary: 20
- Larceny-theft: 57
- Motor vehicle theft: 1
- Arson: 0
- Total property crime: 78
- Note: Reported crimes per 100,000 population Source: 2012 FBI UCR Data

== Crime ==
According to the Uniform Crime Report statistics compiled by the Federal Bureau of Investigation in 2012, two violent crimes and 78 property crimes per 100,000 residents occur per year. Of these, the violent crimes consisted of one forcible rape, no robberies, and one aggravated assault, while 20 burglaries, 57 larceny-thefts, one motor vehicle theft, and no arson defined the property offenses.

== Education ==
The city is served by the Oroville School District.
