= Dorothy Scott Airport =

Airport in Oroville, United States of America

Dorothy Scott Airport Dorothy Scott Municipal Airport
- IATA: none; ICAO: none; FAA LID: 0S7

Summary
- Airport type: Public
- Owner/Operator: City of Oroville
- Location: Oroville, Washington
- Coordinates: 48°57′42″N 119°24′41″W

Map
- The state of which Dorothy Scott is located in, Washington.

Runways
Direction	Length		Surface
Direction	ft	m	Surface
15/33	4,014	1,223	Asphalt

Statistics (2012)
- Aircraft operations: 19,000
- Based aircraft: 13
- Source: Federal Aviation Administration

Dorothy Scott Airport (FAA LID: 0S7) is a public international airport in Oroville, Washington, United States—a city in the Okanogan region—that was opened in August 1937. It is located 2 miles northeast from the town center, being owned by the City of Oroville. Dorothy Scott Airport has been approved for use. The airport has a pavement management plan to repair the airport's one runway.

== History ==
Dorothy Scott Airport is one of two airports named after a woman who served in World War II for the Women Airforce Service Pilots (WASP) department. Dorothy Scott died during World War II while ferrying aircraft to England and received a posthumous Congressional Gold Medal in 2010. It is classified as an airport of entry by the Washington state, and operates an airport layout plan.

== Facilities and aircraft ==
The airport holds a service classification of federal general aviation airport. In 2010, 40 planes left the airport for local military services, while the same number of planes left it as commercial air taxis. 12,000 airplanes left Dorothy Scott for general itinerant use, and 3100 left as general local flights.

The nearest radio navigation aids from the airport that help the pilot are located in three cities: Omak, Penticton, and Naramata. The last two locations are in Canada. Steven Johnson serves as the airports service manager. The airport offers a public taxi transportation service. The airplane's Area Control Center is located in Seattle, Washington.

== Growth ==
Johnston claimed that the amount of activity at the Dorothy Scott Airport is "amazing". He felt that throughout August and September 2012, the airport has gotten busier. According to Johnston, a person purchased a US$4000 hangar to be placed at this airport. Big World of Flight—an organization that educates children on aviation—is one company that Johnston noted will stop at the airport in September 2012. He assured that Oroville's priority is the expanding of the airport.

== See also ==
- List of airports in Washington
