= Paul Wyatt (footballer) =

English footballer

Personal information
- Date of birth: 29 December 1989 (age 36)
- Place of birth: Modbury, England
- Positions: Attacking midfielder; forward

College career
Years	Team	Apps	(Gls)
2009–2012	James Madison Dukes		

Senior career*
Years	Team	Apps	(Gls)
2012	Reading United	15	(3)
2014	Oklahoma City Energy	19	(1)
- * Club domestic league appearances and goals as of 15 September 2014

Paul Wyatt (born 29 December 1989) is an English professional footballer who plays as a midfielder.

Paul has also played for Tiverton Town.

== Career ==
Wyatt played four years of college soccer at James Madison University between 2009 and 2012. He also played for USL PDL club Reading United AC in 2012.

Wyatt signed for USL Pro club Oklahoma City Energy on 14 February 2014.
