= Adda Djeziri =

Danish–Algerian footballer (born 1988)

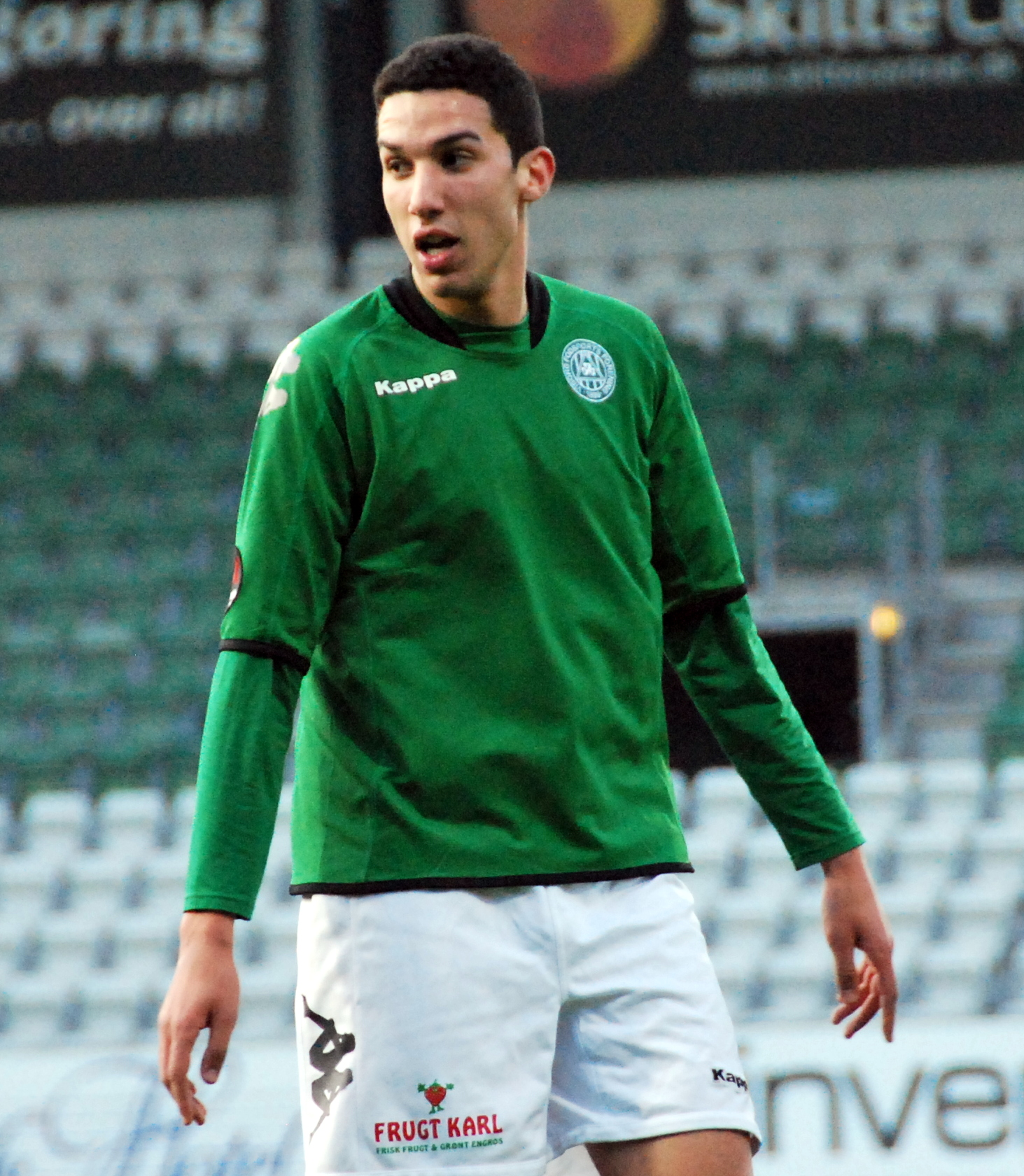
- Djeziri playing for Viborg FF in 2012

Personal information
- Date of birth: August 3, 1988 (age 38)
- Place of birth: Copenhagen, Denmark
- Height: 1.95 m (6 ft 5 in)
- Position: Striker

Team information
- Current team: Luangprabang United

Youth career
- 2001–2006: BK Frem

Senior career*
Years	Team	Apps	(Gls)
2006–2008	BK Frem	13	(1)
2007	→ Rangers (loan)	0	(0)
2007	→ Leicester City (loan)	0	(0)
2008	Portsmouth	0	(0)
2008–2009	Hjørring	10	(2)
2009–2010	Vejle	21	(5)
2010–2012	HB Køge	17	(1)
2012	Viborg FF	6	(0)
2012–2013	Blackpool	0	(0)
2012–2013	→ Scunthorpe United (loan)	4	(0)
2014–2015	Oklahoma City Energy	24	(4)
2015	ASO Chlef	3	(0)
2017–2018	Vojvodina	0	(0)
2018–	Luangprabang United	0	(0)
- * Club domestic league appearances and goals as of 28 September 2017

Adda Djeziri (born 3 August 1988) is a Danish-Algerian footballer who as of November 2019 plays for Lao team Luangprabang United.

== Club career ==
=== Early career ===
Born in Copenhagen, Djeziri began his career with Danish club BK Frem before joining Scotland's Rangers on loan. Djeziri played in the Rangers reserve and under-19 teams until the end of the 2006–07 season with a view to a permanent deal. He would have commanded a transfer fee of around £125,000. He was part of the Rangers under-19 team which won the 2007 Scottish Youth Cup and Youth League double.

=== England ===
On 3 September 2007, Djeziri joined Ian Holloway at Leicester City on loan until December 31. On 9 January 2008 Djeziri joined South Coast based English Premier League side Portsmouth under Harry Redknapp.

=== Denmark ===
In May 2008, he signed for Hjørring, and in August 2008 moved to Vejle. While with Vejle Djeziri had a solid campaign with his club. In September 2010 once his contract had expired with Vejle he joined HB Køge on a free transfer. At HB Køge he appeared in 17 league matches, scoring a memorable goal to win the game 2–1 away at Viborg.

=== Return to England ===
After spending a month on trial in England with Blackpool Djeziri signed a one-year deal with an option for a further year with the Championship side. On 22 November 2012 Djeziri completed a loan move to Scunthorpe United where stayed until 5 January 2013. Djeziri had a trial with Birmingham City in August 2013.

=== Serbia ===
After playing for USA club Oklahoma City Energy and Algerian side ASO Chlef, Djeziri spent almost two years on free transfer. On 28 September 2017 it was announced that he moved to Serbian club Vojvodina.

=== Laos ===
In 2018 Djeziri joined Laos-based team Luangprabang United.

== International career ==
In an interview, he stated that he wanted to represent Algeria in international competition.
