= Steven Perry =

American soccer player

Personal information
- Full name: Steven Perry
- Date of birth: September 7, 1988 (age 38)
- Place of birth: Edmond, Oklahoma, United States
- Height: 6 ft 0 in (1.83 m)
- Position: Forward

Youth career
- 2007–2010: Notre Dame Fighting Irish

Senior career*
Years	Team	Apps	(Gls)
2009–2010	Indiana Invaders	12	(2)
2011	Ekenäs IF	25	(28)
2012–2013	Wilmington Hammerheads	36	(6)
2014	Oklahoma City Energy	28	(3)
- * Club domestic league appearances and goals as of September 11, 2014

Steven Perry (born September 7, 1988, in Edmond, Oklahoma) is an American soccer player.

== Career ==
Perry played college soccer at the University of Notre Dame between 2007 and 2010. At college he was named - 2010 First Team All-Big East, 2010 Second Team All-Great lakes Region and was Four-Time Big-East Academic All-Star.

During his time at Notre Dame, Perry also played for USL Premier Development League club Indiana Invaders in 2009 and 2010.

On January 13, 2011, Perry was drafted in the third round (39th overall) of the 2011 MLS SuperDraft by New England Revolution, but was not signed by the club.

Perry played with Finnish third division club Ekenäs IF for their 2011 season.

Perry signed his first fully professional contract with USL Professional Division club Wilmington Hammerheads on March 14, 2012.
