= Kyle Miller (soccer) =

American soccer player

Personal information
- Date of birth: May 12, 1989 (age 37)
- Place of birth: Overland Park, Kansas, United States
- Height: 5 ft 9 in (1.75 m)
- Position: Defender

Youth career
- 2006–2007: Kansas City Wizards
- 2007–2011: Rockhurst Hawks

Senior career*
Years	Team	Apps	(Gls)
2011	Kansas City Brass	5	(3)
2012–2013	Sporting Kansas City	0	(0)
2014	Oklahoma City Energy	25	(1)
2015	Atlanta Silverbacks	9	(0)
- * Club domestic league appearances and goals as of September 15, 2014

Kyle Miller (born May 12, 1989, in Overland Park, Kansas) is an American soccer player.

== Career ==
=== College and amateur ===
Miller played four years of college soccer at Rockhurst University between 2008 and 2011. While at college, Miller also appeared for USL PDL club Kansas City Brass during their 2011 season.

=== Professional ===
Miller was drafted in the third round (54th overall) of the 2012 MLS Supplemental Draft by Sporting Kansas City. Miller spent two years with Sporting, but never made a first-team appearance. He was waived by the club on December 11, 2013.

Miller signed with USL Pro club Oklahoma City Energy on February 5, 2014.

After a season with Oklahoma City, Miller signed with NASL club Atlanta Silverbacks on February 3, 2015.
