= Kyle Greig =

American soccer player

Personal information
- Date of birth: February 22, 1990 (age 36)
- Place of birth: Stevens Point, Wisconsin, U.S.
- Height: 6 ft 2 in (1.88 m)
- Position: Forward

College career
Years	Team	Apps	(Gls)
2008–2011	Benedictine Ravens	74	(43)

Senior career*
Years	Team	Apps	(Gls)
2010–2012	Kansas City Brass	41	(10)
2013	Wilmington Hammerheads	24	(6)
2014–2015	Oklahoma City Energy	51	(16)
2016	Whitecaps FC 2	27	(11)
2016	→ Vancouver Whitecaps FC (loan)	0	(0)
2017	Vancouver Whitecaps FC	1	(0)
2017	→ Whitecaps FC 2 (loan)	5	(0)
2017	→ FC Cincinnati (loan)	12	(1)
2018–2020	Saint Louis FC	75	(23)
2021	Louisville City	27	(5)
2022	Tampa Bay Rowdies	20	(2)
- * Club domestic league appearances and goals as of October 19, 2022

Kyle Greig (born February 22, 1990) is an American soccer player who plays as a forward.

== Career ==
Greig played four years of college soccer at Benedictine College between 2008 and 2011. He also played for USL PDL club Kansas City Brass between 2010 and 2012.

Greig signed his first professional contract with USL Pro club Wilmington Hammerheads in April 2013. He made his debut and scored his first professional goal on April 19, 2013, during a 2–0 victory over Antigua Barracuda FC.

After two seasons with Oklahoma City Energy, Greig signed with Whitecaps FC 2 on January 29, 2016. He made the move to the Whitecaps senior team in Major League Soccer on December 19, 2016.

During the 2017 season, Greig was loaned out to United Soccer League club FC Cincinnati. His loan ended when FC Cincinnati's 2017 season ended.

Greig joined USL club Saint Louis FC on February 21, 2018. Saint Louis FC folded following the 2020 USL Championship season.

On May 20, 2021, it was announced that Greig had signed with Louisville City. Following the 2021 season, Louisville opted to decline their contract option on Greig.

Greig signed with the Tampa Bay Rowdies on January 14, 2022. He was released by Tampa following their 2022 season.
