= Jennings Clark =

American professional soccer player

Personal information
- Full name: Ray Jennings Clark
- Date of birth: December 3, 1990 (age 35)
- Place of birth: Norman, Oklahoma, United States
- Height: 1.84 m (6 ft 1/2 in)
- Position: Goalkeeper

Youth career
- 2007–2010: Norman High School
- 2010: Tulsa Golden Hurricane
- 2011: Tonkawa Mavericks
- 2011: OCCC Soccer Club
- 2012: Midwestern State Mustangs
- 2013: USAO Drovers

Senior career*
Years	Team	Apps	(Gls)
2014–2015	Oklahoma City Energy	4	(0)
- * Club domestic league appearances and goals as of October 3, 2016

Ray Jennings Clark (born December 3, 1990) is an American professional soccer player who last played as a goalkeeper for Oklahoma City Energy in the USL Pro.

== Career ==
=== Early career ===
Clark played college soccer at numerous colleges between the period of 2010 and 2013.

=== Professional ===
Clark signed his first professional contract with USL Pro club Oklahoma City Energy on February 27, 2014.
