= Dan Delgado =

Mexican footballer

Personal information
- Full name: Danchrisandre Delgado Davila
- Date of birth: September 17, 1991 (age 35)
- Place of birth: Mexico
- Height: 1.80 m (5 ft 11 in)
- Position: Midfielder

College career
Years	Team	Apps	(Gls)
2009–2012	San Diego Toreros		

Senior career*
Years	Team	Apps	(Gls)
2012	Orange County Blue Star	2	(0)
2014	Ventura County Fusion	5	(0)
2014–2015	Oklahoma City Energy	18	(2)
- * Club domestic league appearances and goals as of August 27, 2015

Danchrisandre "Dan" Delgado Davila (born September 17, 1991) is a Mexican professional footballer who plays as a midfielder.

== Career ==
=== Early career ===
Delgado played college soccer at the University of San Diego between 2009 and 2012. While in college, he also appeared for the USL PDL club Orange County Blue Star in 2012.

=== Professional ===
On January 17, 2013, Delgado was drafted in the second round of the 2013 MLS SuperDraft (33rd overall) by San Jose Earthquakes. Delgado was not signed by the club, although he did appear for the Earthquakes' reserve team.

In 2014, Delgado began the season with the USL PDL club Ventura County Fusion, before signing with USL Pro's Oklahoma City Energy on June 26, 2014.
