= Michael Thomas (American soccer) =

American soccer player

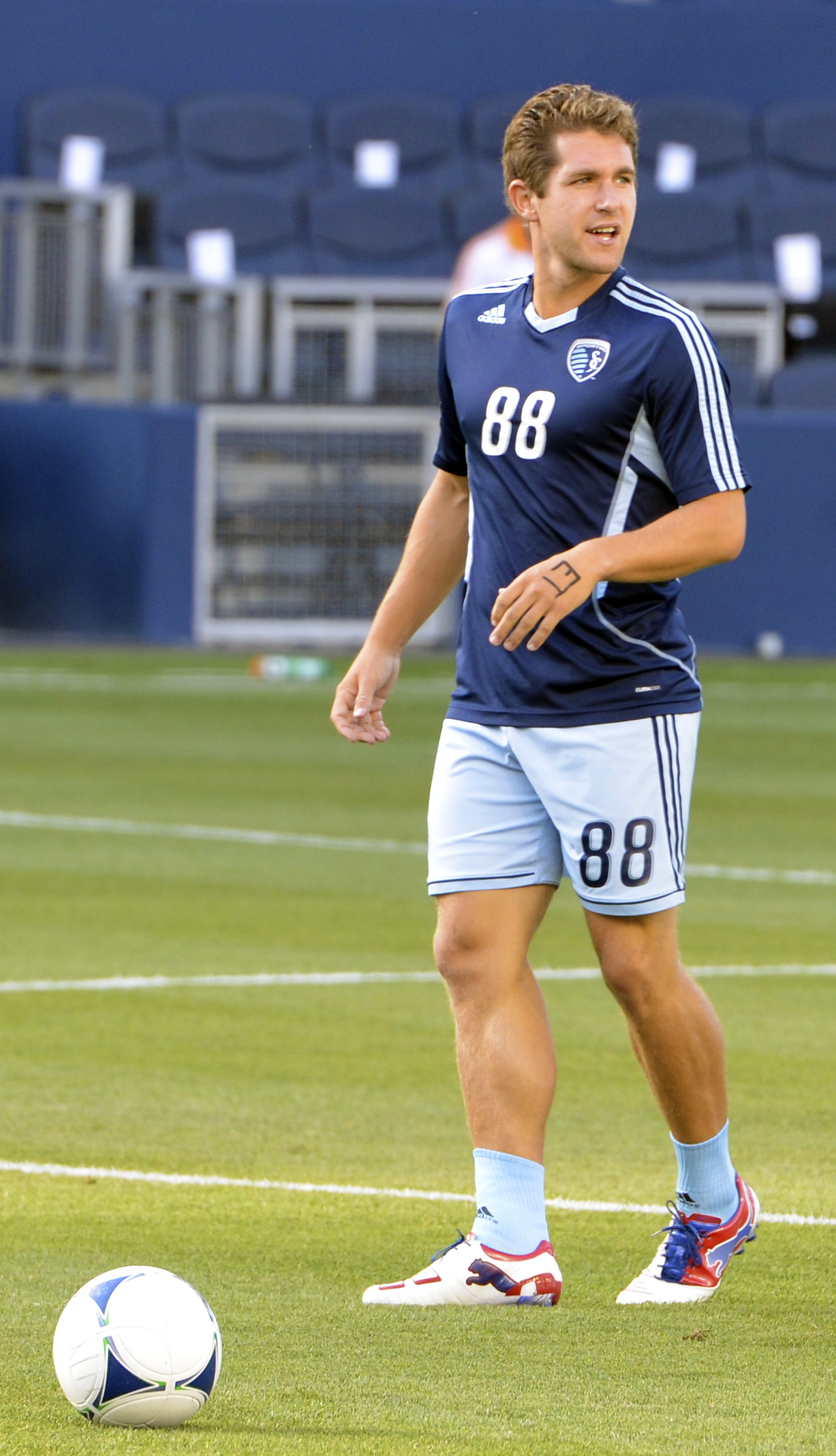
- Thomas warming up at Livestrong Sporting Park

Personal information
- Full name: Michael Thomas
- Date of birth: March 8, 1988 (age 38)
- Place of birth: Olathe, Kansas, United States
- Height: 5 ft 10 in (1.78 m)
- Position: Midfielder

College career
Years	Team	Apps	(Gls)
2006–2009	Notre Dame Fighting Irish		

Senior career*
Years	Team	Apps	(Gls)
2006–2009	Kansas City Brass	13	(2)
2010	Halmstads BK	5	(0)
2010–2011	Ljungskile SK	42	(8)
2012–2013	Sporting Kansas City	7	(0)
2013	Toronto FC	1	(0)
2014–2016	Oklahoma City Energy	82	(11)
- * Club domestic league appearances and goals as of October 3, 2016

Michael Thomas (born March 8, 1988, in Olathe, Kansas) is a former American soccer player.

== Career ==
=== College and amateur ===
Thomas attended University of Notre Dame where he played in midfield for the Notre Dame Fighting Irish. Thomas was selected to play with Region II (Midwest) 88 ODP Regional Team in events at the Home Depot Center in Carson, California as well as international events in Italy and Spain. Listed on CollegeSoccerNews.com 100 Freshmen To Keep An Eye On In 2006.

During his college years Thomas also played for Kansas City Brass in the USL Premier Development League.

=== Professional ===
Thomas was drafted in the second round (19th overall) of the 2010 MLS SuperDraft by San Jose Earthquakes. Shortly after the draft Thomas left the United States to go on trial with Halmstads BK in Allsvenskan and following the club's failure to loan wished players from its partner club RCD Espanyol, Thomas was offered a short-term contract, 4 month with an option for the rest of the year, which he signed on February 21, 2010, however due to uncertainties what rules applied, Swedish or American, and Thomas' previous club affiliation, it took some time and the help of both the American and Swedish FA before Thomas was completely signed by Halmstads BK on March 20. On July 3 Halmstads BK reported that they would not use the clause to extend Thomas' contract until the end of the season and that Joakim Wrele from the youth squad would take his place.

Shortly after his departure from Halmstads BK, he went on trial with Superettan club Ljungskile SK and following a successful trial the club decided to sign him for the rest of the 2010 season. Thomas was a starter for the club appearing in 47 league matches and scoring 8 goals.

On January 18, 2012, Thomas signed a contract with Major League Soccer club Sporting Kansas City making his return to his native Kansas. The previous day Sporting Kansas City had acquired Thomas' MLS rights from San Jose in exchange for a fourth-round pick in the 2012 MLS Supplemental Draft.

Thomas was traded to Toronto FC on July 2, 2013, in exchange for a second-round 2015 MLS SuperDraft pick. He was not retained following the 2013 season

Michael Thomas became the first player to sign with Oklahoma City Energy FC ahead of its 2014 inaugural season.
