= 2018 OKC Energy FC season =

OKC Energy
2018 season
- Owner: Prodigal LLC
- Head coach: Steve Cooke
- United Soccer League: Western Conference: 10th
- USL Playoffs: Did not qualify
- U.S. Open Cup: Second round (knocked out by NTX Rayados)
- Black Gold Derby: Champions (5–1)
- Top goalscorer: League: Alex Dixon (11); All: Alex Dixon (11)
- Highest home attendance: 6,757 (March 17 vs. Tulsa)
- Lowest home attendance: 2,574 (March 28 vs. Orange County)
- Average home league attendance: 4,298
Home colors	Away colors

The 2018 OKC Energy FC season was the club's fifth season of existence, and their fifth consecutive season in the United Soccer League, the second tier of American soccer. Energy FC also played in the U.S. Open Cup. The season covered the period from November 5, 2017, to the beginning of the 2019 USL season.

The 2018 season was the first for OKC under new head coach Steve Cooke, who had previously been the interim head coach of Colorado Rapids. Cooke became just the second head coach in club history; Jimmy Nielsen had been in charge for the previous four seasons.

Energy FC finished tenth place in the Western Conference, missing the playoffs for just the second time in club history and the first time since 2014. OKC took points from 16 of their last 21 matches, after losing 10 of their first 13 games, but still finished 10 points outside the final playoff spot. In the U.S. Open Cup, Energy FC was knocked out by amateur club NTX Rayados, who play in the North Texas Premier Soccer Association. It marked the first season in club history in which OKC did not win at least one game in the cup.

== Roster ==
As of match played October 13, 2018

No.	Name	Nationality	Position(s)	Date of birth (age)	Signed in	Previous club	Apps	Goals
Goalkeepers
1	Cody Laurendi	(Puerto Rico)	GK	August 15, 1988 (age 37)	2016	(United States) Austin Aztex	65	0
16	Bryan Byars	(United States)	GK	October 2, 1991 (age 34)	2018	(United States) Tulsa Roughnecks	8	0
30	Matt Van Oekel	(United States)	GK	September 20, 1986 (age 39)	2018	(United States) Real Salt Lake	19	0
Defenders
2	Richard Dixon	(Jamaica)	DF	February 23, 1990 (age 36)	2017	(United States) Saint Louis FC	55	0
3	Kyle Hyland	(United States)	DF	March 1, 1991 (age 35)	2016	(United States) Indy Eleven	86	5
5	Christian Ibeagha	(United States)	DF	January 10, 1990 (age 36)	2018	(United States) North Carolina FC	28	2
6	Drew Beckie	(Canada)	DF	September 30, 1990 (age 35)	2018	(United States) Jacksonville Armada	20	0
15	Atiba Harris	(Saint Kitts and Nevis)	DF	January 9, 1985 (age 41)	2018	(Mexico) Murciélagos	14	1
19	Max Gunderson	(United States)	DF	November 5, 1989 (age 36)	2018	(United States) OKC Energy U23	13	0
23	Shawn McLaws	(United States)	DF	March 9, 1993 (age 32)	2018	(United States) Harrisburg City Islanders	13	0
Midfielders
4	Callum Ross	(England)	MF	September 15, 1994 (age 31)	2018	(United States) Charlotte Independence	31	2
7	Philip Rasmussen	(Denmark)	MF	January 12, 1989 (age 37)	2017	(Denmark) Lyngby BK	40	6
8	Juan Guzman	(United States)	MF	August 31, 1988 (age 37)	2017	(Colombia) Patriotas	34	2
11	Alex Dixon	(United States)	MF	February 7, 1990 (age 36)	2017	(United States) Jacksonville Armada	71	20
13	Justin Chavez	(United States)	MF	March 23, 1990 (age 35)	2018	(United States) Tampa Bay Rowdies	29	0
14	José Barril	(Spain)	MF	April 25, 1992 (age 33)	2017	(United States) Harrisburg City Islanders	68	4
21	Kalif Alhassan	(Ghana)	MF	October 15, 1990 (age 35)	2018	(Georgia (country)) Dila Gori	6	0
22	Marco Bustos	(Canada)	MF	April 22, 1996 (age 29)	2018	(Canada) Vancouver Whitecaps FC	9	1
27	Ryley Kraft	(United States)	MF	February 13, 1998 (age 28)	2018	(United States) Orlando City B	0	0
Forwards
9	Adam Jahn	(United States)	FW	January 5, 1991 (age 35)	2018	(United States) Columbus Crew SC (loan)	10	3
10	Miguel González	(Mexico)	FW	October 1, 1990 (age 35)	2017	(United States) Colorado Springs Switchbacks	48	11
12	Christian Volesky	(United States)	FW	September 15, 1992 (age 33)	2018	(United States) Saint Louis FC	23	9
17	Jonathan Brown	(Wales)	FW	April 17, 1990 (age 35)	2017	(Bangladesh) Abahani Limited Dhaka	37	1
20	Deshorn Brown	(Jamaica)	FW	December 22, 1990 (age 35)	2018	(Spain) Lorca	4	1
28	Monty Patterson	(New Zealand)	FW	December 9, 1996 (age 29)	2018	(New Zealand) Wellington Phoenix	3	1
32	Jaime Siaj	(Jordan)	FW	December 16, 1995 (age 30)	2018	(United States) Charlotte Independence	23	4

== Non-competitive ==
=== Preseason ===
February 8 Friendly	FC Dallas	1–1	OKC Energy	Frisco, TX
10:00 AM CST	Servania	Report	J. Brown	Stadium: Toyota Soccer Center

February 10 Friendly	OKC Energy	5–0	OEFC Boys '99	Norman, OK
3:00 PM CST	Trialist; Trialist; Trialist; Dike	Report		Stadium: John Crain Field

February 17 Friendly	OKC Energy	5–0	SMU Mustangs	Norman, OK
3:00 PM CST	González 24', 35'; Barril 33', 42'; Trialist 71'	Report		Stadium: John Crain Field

February 24 Friendly	Tulsa Golden Hurricane	0–3	OKC Energy	Tulsa, OK
3:00 PM CST		Report	González 15'; Ibeagha 52'; A. Dixon 84'	Stadium: Hurricane Soccer & Track Stadium

February 28 Friendly	OKC Energy	5–0	Toronto FC II	Tucson, AZ
4:00 PM CST	A. Dixon; Trialist; Trialist; Ibeagha	Report		Stadium: Kino Sports Complex

March 3 Friendly	Grand Canyon Antelopes	1–0	OKC Energy	Phoenix, AZ
5:00 PM CST	Andrew	Report		Stadium: GCU Stadium

March 6 Friendly	Sporting Arizona	0–9	OKC Energy	Tucson, AZ
4:00 PM CST		Report	Siaj 13', 59'; A. Dixon 18', 39'; Barrill; Twumasi; Rasmussen (pen.), 56'	Stadium: Kino Sports Complex

March 9 Friendly	Phoenix Rising	2–2	OKC Energy	Tempe, AZ
4:00 PM CST	Johnson 20', 75'	Report	J. Brown 81'; Atuahene 84'	Stadium: Phoenix Rising FC Soccer Complex

== Competitions ==
=== USL ===
==== Standings ====
Pos	Team	Pld	W	D	L	GF	GA	GD	Pts	Qualification
8	Saint Louis FC	34	14	11	9	44	38	+6	53	Conference Playoffs
9	San Antonio FC	34	14	8	12	45	48	−3	50	
10	OKC Energy FC	34	12	7	15	43	46	−3	43	
11	Colorado Springs Switchbacks	34	11	6	17	36	39	−3	39	
12	Fresno FC	34	9	12	13	44	38	+6	39	

Source: 2018 USL standings
Rules for classification: 1) total wins; 2) total goal differential; 3) total goals scored; 4) points earned against top four Conference finishers; 5) disciplinary points; 6) coin toss or drawing of lots

==== Results summary ====
Overall								Home						Away					
Pld	W	D	L	GF	GA	GD	Pts	W	D	L	GF	GA	GD	W	D	L	GF	GA	GD
34	12	7	15	43	46	−3	43	7	3	7	21	21	0	5	4	8	22	25	−3

Source: USL standings

==== Results by round ====
Round	1	2	3	4	5	6	7	8	9	10	11	12	13	14	15	16	17	18	19	20	21	22	23	24	25	26	27	28	29	30	31	32	33	34
Stadium	H	A	H	A	H	H	A	H	H	H	A	H	A	A	H	H	A	H	H	A	H	H	A	A	H	A	H	A	A	A	H	A	A	A
Result	W	L	L	L	L	L	L	L	L	W	D	L	L	W	W	W	D	D	W	D	D	L	L	W	W	W	W	L	L	W	D	W	L	D

Source: Energy FC schedule
A = Away; H = Home; W = Win; D = Draw; L = Loss

==== Match results ====
In August 2017, the USL announced that the 2018 season would span 34 games, the longest regular season the league had ever run. The expansion was spurred by the addition of six new clubs for the 2018 season: Atlanta United 2, Fresno FC, Indy Eleven, Las Vegas Lights, Nashville SC, and North Carolina FC.

On January 12, 2018, the league announced home openers for every club. Energy FC opened their home slate with the season's first fixture of the Black Gold Derby against Tulsa Roughnecks, the second time in four years that Energy FC and Tulsa faced off in the season opener. The teams had previously faced off to open the 2015 season.

The schedule for the remainder of the 2018 season was released on January 19. Energy FC played three times against both Colorado Springs Switchbacks and Tulsa. They faced every other Western Conference team twice.

March 17 1	OKC Energy	1–0	Tulsa Roughnecks	Oklahoma City, OK
7:00 PM CDT	Atuahene 6'; Barril (yellow card) 45+2'; Siaj (yellow card) 89'	Report	Ugarte (yellow card) 39' (yellow-red card) 89'; Muñoz (yellow card) 50'; Rivas (yellow card) 83'; Maidana (yellow card) 90+1'	Stadium: Taft Stadium; Attendance: 6,757; Referee: Luis Guardia

March 24 2	Phoenix Rising	4–1	OKC Energy	Tempe, AZ
9:00 PM CDT	Asante 28'; Cortez 45', 83', 90+4'; Woszczynski (yellow card) 90+1'	Report	Guzman (yellow card) 21'; R. Dixon (yellow card) 21'; González (yellow card) 52'; Ibeagha 85'	Stadium: Phoenix Rising FC Soccer Complex; Attendance: 6,828; Referee: Malik Badawi

March 28 3	OKC Energy	0–1	Orange County SC	Oklahoma City, OK
7:00 PM CDT	Adjei (yellow card) 81'	Report	Enevoldsen 13'; Sorto (yellow card) 36'; Quinn (yellow card) 60'	Stadium: Taft Stadium; Attendance: 2,574; Referee: Rubiel Vazquez

March 31 4	Fresno FC	2–1	OKC Energy	Fresno, CA
9:00 PM CDT	Caffa 15'; Argueta 78', (yellow card) 79'	Report	Siaj 21'; R. Dixon (yellow card) 38'	Stadium: Chukchansi Park; Attendance: 5,123; Referee: Farhad Dadkho

April 7 5	OKC Energy	0–3	Portland Timbers 2	Oklahoma City, OK
7:00 PM CDT	Ibeagha (yellow card) 83'	Report	Langsdorf 34', (yellow card) 45'; Vytas (yellow card) 38'; Arboleda 54'; McIntosh (yellow card) 57'; Batista 84' (pen.)	Stadium: Taft Stadium; Attendance: 4,041; Referee: Marco Vega

April 21 6	OKC Energy	0–1	Saint Louis FC	Oklahoma City, OK
7:00 PM CDT	Guzman (yellow card) 14'; Chavez (yellow card) 45+1' (yellow-red card) 85'; Ross (yellow card) 81'; Hyland (yellow card) 90'	Report	Volesky 20'; Culbertson (yellow card) 90+4'	Stadium: Taft Stadium; Attendance: 2,679; Referee: Michael Radchuk

April 28 7	Reno 1868	2–0	OKC Energy	Reno, NV
9:00 PM CDT	Partida 64'; Mfeka 87'	Report	Ross (yellow card) 29'; González (red card) 37'	Stadium: Greater Nevada Field; Attendance: 4,153; Referee: Rosendo Mendoza

May 5 8	OKC Energy	0–1	Swope Park Rangers	Oklahoma City, OK
7:00 PM CDT	R. Dixon (yellow card) 13'; Ibeagha (yellow card) 70'; Angulo (yellow card) 79'; Van Oekel (yellow card) 86'	Report	Didic (yellow card) 82'; Barry 86' (pen.); Belmar (yellow card) 90+2'	Stadium: Taft Stadium; Attendance: 4,508; Referee: José Lara

May 9 9	OKC Energy	0–3	Phoenix Rising	Oklahoma City, OK
7:00 PM CDT	Chavez (yellow card) 54'; Ross (yellow card) 61'; Ibeagha (yellow card) 76'; R. Dixon (yellow card) 88'	Report	Farrell 16' da Fonte 22', (yellow card) 54'; Johnson 75'	Stadium: Taft Stadium; Attendance: 2,616; Referee: Marcos de Oliveira

May 19 10	OKC Energy	1–0	Colorado Springs Switchbacks	Oklahoma City, OK
7:00 PM CDT	Ross 82'	Report	Schweitzer (yellow card) 73'; Suggs (yellow card) 85'; Uzo (yellow card) 90+1'	Stadium: Taft Stadium; Attendance: 5,347; Referee: Matthew Franz

May 26 11	Tulsa Roughnecks	1–1	OKC Energy	Tulsa, OK
7:00 PM CDT	Mirković (yellow card) 11'; Rivas 16', (yellow card) 87'; Jusino (yellow card) 41'	Report	Volesky 1'; Ibeagha (yellow card) 76'	Stadium: ONEOK Field; Attendance: 3,366; Referee: Elvis Osmanovic

June 2 12	OKC Energy	1–2	Reno 1868	Oklahoma City, OK
7:30 PM CDT	A. Dixon 34'	Report	Carroll 2'; Richards (yellow card) 39'; Mfeka 76'	Stadium: Taft Stadium; Attendance: 3,203; Referee: Victor Rivas

June 10 13	Seattle Sounders FC 2	2–1	OKC Energy	Tacoma, WA
3:30 PM CDT	Usman (yellow card) 45'; Estrada 83', 85'; Olsen (yellow card) 90+3'	Report	Beckie (yellow card) 7'; Alhassan (yellow card) 75'; A. Dixon 76'	Stadium: Cheney Stadium; Attendance: 3,305; Referee: Rosendo Mendoza

June 13 14	Portland Timbers 2	1–2	OKC Energy	Portland, OR
9:00 PM CDT	Langsdorf 49' (pen.)	Report	Siaj 6'; Ibeagha 62', (yellow card) 90'	Stadium: Providence Park; Attendance: 4,147; Referee: Jeff Arthurholtz

June 16 15	OKC Energy	3–1	Rio Grande Valley FC Toros	Oklahoma City, OK
7:30 PM CDT	Beckie (yellow card) 10'; Siaj 21'; Ross 53'; González 90+7'	Report	Ontiveros (yellow card) 5', (goal) 15'; Delgado (yellow card) 69'	Stadium: Taft Stadium; Attendance: 3,903; Referee: Marcos de Oliveira

June 23 16	OKC Energy	1–0	LA Galaxy II	Oklahoma City, OK
7:30 PM CDT	Siaj (yellow card) 45+5'; Volesky 90'	Report	Zanga (yellow card) 56'	Stadium: Taft Stadium; Attendance: 4,015; Referee: Lorant Varga

July 4 17	San Antonio FC	1–1	OKC Energy	San Antonio, TX
7:30 PM CDT	Cuomo (yellow card) 13'; Hedrick (yellow card) 56'; King (yellow card) 62'; Bruce 77'	Report	Rasmussen (yellow card) 35'; Barril 68'; Ross (yellow card) 80'; Ibeagha (yellow card) 90+2'	Stadium: Toyota Field; Attendance: 7,234; Referee: Malik Badawi

July 7 18	OKC Energy	1–1	Colorado Springs Switchbacks	Oklahoma City, OK
7:30 PM CDT	A. Dixon 16'; Atuahene (yellow card) 33'; Rasmussen (yellow card) 42'	Report	Malcolm 48'	Stadium: Taft Stadium; Attendance: 3,433; Referee: José Lara

July 11 19	OKC Energy	6–4	Las Vegas Lights	Oklahoma City, OK
7:00 PM CDT	A. Dixon 12', 72'; Atuahene (yellow card) 37', (goal) 57'; Harris 44'; Siaj 50'; Ibeagha (yellow card) 56'; Barril (yellow card) 56'; Ross (yellow card) 88'; Volesky 90+3'	Report	C. Alvarez 15'; Jaime (yellow card) 56'; Mendiola 65', 70', 90+5'; Alatorre (yellow card) 90+1'	Stadium: Taft Stadium; Attendance: 5,557; Referee: Jon Freemon

July 21 20	Sacramento Republic	1–1	OKC Energy	Sacramento, CA
10:00 PM CDT	Iwasa 23'; Turnley (yellow card) 43'	Report	Harris (yellow card) 30'; A. Dixon (yellow card) 55'; Ibeagha (yellow card) 65'; Volesky 78'	Stadium: Papa Murphy's Park; Attendance: 11,569; Referee: Turan Ozdemir

July 25 21	OKC Energy	0–0	Fresno FC	Oklahoma City, OK
7:30 PM CDT		Report	Kamdem (yellow card) 36'	Stadium: Taft Stadium; Attendance: 2,838; Referee: Ismir Pekmic

July 28 22	OKC Energy	1–2	San Antonio FC	Oklahoma City, OK
7:30 PM CDT	Rasmussen 58'; Harris (yellow card) 80'	Report	Seth (yellow card) 57'; Lopez 73' (pen.); Guzmán 81'; Presley (yellow card) 88'	Stadium: Taft Stadium; Attendance: 5,168; Referee: Elton Garcia

August 4 23	Colorado Springs Switchbacks	2–0	OKC Energy	Colorado Springs, CO
7:00 PM CDT	Malcolm (yellow card) 69', (goal) 89'; Uzo 74', (yellow card) 75'; Azira (yellow card) 80'; Amoako (yellow card) 90+4'	Report	Beckie (yellow card) 52'	Stadium: Weidner Field; Attendance: 4,102; Referee: Adam Zarrin

August 8 24	Tulsa Roughnecks	0–3	OKC Energy	Tulsa, OK
7:30 PM CDT	Rivas (yellow card) 57'; Vuković (yellow card) 57'	Report	Jahn (yellow card) 42', (goal) 45'; Volesky 49'; Ross (yellow card) 72'; A. Dixon 79' (pen.)	Stadium: ONEOK Field; Attendance: 2,805; Referee: Marcos de Oliveira

August 11 25	OKC Energy	3–2	Real Monarchs	Oklahoma City, OK
7:30 PM CDT	Volesky 1'; A.Dixon 27'; Barril (yellow card) 62'; Patterson 83'	Report	Adams 58'; Blake 60'; Mare (yellow card) 90+1'	Stadium: Taft Stadium; Attendance: 5,616; Referee: Elijio Arreguin

August 18 26	Rio Grande Valley FC Toros	2–4	OKC Energy	Edinburg, TX
7:30 PM CDT	Zaldívar 45+5'; Greene (yellow card) 62'; Wharton 79' (pen.)	Report	Volesky 34', 54'; A. Dixon 36'; Jahn 67'; Barril (yellow card) 69'; Beckie (yellow card) 84'	Stadium: H-E-B Park; Attendance: 4,177; Referee: Sergii Demianchuk

August 25 27	OKC Energy	3–0	Seattle Sounders FC 2	Oklahoma City, OK
7:30 PM CDT	Volesky 28'; Jahn 56'; Bustos 78', (yellow card) 79'	Report	Ele (yellow card) 2'; Alfaro (yellow card) 52'; Daley (yellow card) 55'; Olsen (yellow card) 62'	Stadium: Taft Stadium; Attendance: 4,732; Referee: Luis Guardia

September 2 28	Swope Park Rangers	1–0	OKC Energy	Kansas City, KS
4:00 PM CDT	Barry 26'; Zendejas (yellow card) 90+2'	Report	Barril (yellow card) 61'; A. Dixon (yellow card) 84'; Jahn (yellow card) 90+5'	Stadium: Children's Mercy Park; Attendance: 993; Referee: Sergii Demianchuk

September 8 29	Orange County SC	3–2	OKC Energy	Irvine, CA
9:00 PM CDT	Seaton 24'; Powder 90+4'; Quinn 90+5'; Hooiveld (yellow card) 90+6'	Report	Rasmussen 20' (pen.); Ibeagha (yellow card) 32'; A. Dixon 64'	Stadium: Championship Soccer Stadium; Referee: Daniel Radford

September 12 30	LA Galaxy II	1–3	OKC Energy	Carson, CA
9:30 PM CDT	F. López 13' (pen.); Zanga (yellow card) 87'	Report	Harris (yellow card) 32'; Barril 41'; Rasmussen 72'; A. Dixon 81'; Jahn (yellow card) 88'	Stadium: StubHub Center Track Stadium; Attendance: 751; Referee: Michael Radchuk

September 23 31	OKC Energy	0–0	Sacramento Republic	Oklahoma City, OK
6:00 PM CDT	Harris (yellow card) 9'; Ross (yellow card) 84'	Report	Gomez (yellow card) 39'; Matjašič (yellow card) 78'	Stadium: Taft Stadium; Attendance: 6,084; Referee: Rosendo Mendoza

September 29 32	Las Vegas Lights	0–1	OKC Energy	Las Vegas, NV
10:00 PM CDT	Pérez (yellow card) 77'; C. Alvarez (yellow card) 90+6'; Olsen (yellow card) 90+6'	Report	D. Brown 73'; Beckie (yellow card) 90+4'	Stadium: Cashman Field; Attendance: 6,578; Referee: Elton Garcia

October 3 33	Real Monarchs	2–1	OKC Energy	Herriman, UT
8:00 PM CDT	Saucedo 17', 48'; Sparrow (yellow card) 21'	Report	A. Dixon 22' (pen.); Ross (yellow card) 75'	Stadium: Zions Bank Stadium; Attendance: 1,170; Referee: Alejandro Mariscal

October 13 34	Saint Louis FC	0–0	OKC Energy	Fenton, MO
7:30 PM CDT	Dikwa (yellow card) 90+3'	Report	Barril (yellow card) 44'; Rasmussen (yellow card) 48'	Stadium: Toyota Stadium; Attendance: 6,018; Referee: Malik Badawi

=== U.S. Open Cup ===
May 16 Second round	NTX Rayados	5–2 (a.e.t.)	OKC Energy	Dallas, TX
7:30 PM CDT	Burciaga (yellow card) 27'; Rodríguez 38', 118'; Salas (yellow card) 51'; Pfluger (yellow card) 82'; Okeke 90' (pen.), 105'; Martínez (yellow card) 104', (goal) 108' (pen.)	Report	Rasmussen 50' (pen.); González 61'; Barril (yellow card) 81'	Stadium: Richland Soccer Complex; Attendance: 250; Referee: Ramon Bermúdez

== Statistics ==
=== Appearances and goals ===
No.	Pos.	Name	USL		U.S. Open Cup		Total	
No.	Pos.	Name	Apps	Goals	Apps	Goals	Apps	Goals
1	GK	(Puerto Rico) Cody Laurendi	9	0	0	0	9	0
2	DF	(Jamaica) Richard Dixon	25	0	1	0	26	0
3	DF	(United States) Kyle Hyland	24	0	1	0	25	0
4	MF	(England) Callum Ross	30	2	1	0	31	2
5	DF	(United States) Christian Ibeagha	28	2	0	0	28	2
6	DF	(Canada) Drew Beckie	20	0	0	0	20	0
7	MF	(Denmark) Philip Rasmussen	25	3	1	1	26	4
8	MF	(United States) Juan Guzman	6	0	0	0	6	0
9	FW	(United States) Adam Jahn	10	3	0	0	10	3
10	FW	(Mexico) Miguel González	13	1	1	1	14	2
11	MF	(United States) Alex Dixon	34	11	1	0	35	11
12	FW	(United States) Christian Volesky	22	9	1	0	23	9
13	MF	(United States) Justin Chavez	28	0	1	0	29	0
14	MF	(Spain) José Barril	33	2	1	0	34	2
15	DF	(Saint Kitts and Nevis) Atiba Harris	14	1	0	0	14	1
16	GK	(United States) Bryan Byars	8	0	0	0	8	0
17	FW	(Wales) Jonathan Brown	25	0	0	0	25	0
19	DF	(United States) Max Gunderson	1	0	1	0	2	0
20	FW	(Jamaica) Deshorn Brown	4	1	0	0	4	1
21	MF	(Ghana) Kalif Alhassan	6	0	0	0	6	0
22	MF	(Canada) Marco Bustos	9	1	0	0	9	1
23	DF	(United States) Shawn McLaws	12	0	1	0	13	0
27	MF	(United States) Ryley Kraft	0	0	0	0	0	0
28	FW	(New Zealand) Monty Patterson	3	1	0	0	3	1
30	GK	(United States) Matt Van Oekel	18	0	1	0	19	0
32	FW	(Jordan) Jaime Siaj	23	4	0	0	23	4
Players who left the club during the season:
9	FW	(Colombia) José Angulo	4	0	0	0	4	0
20	DF	(Ghana) Joseph Adjei	4	0	1	0	5	0
22	MF	(Colombia) Juan Niño	0	0	0	0	0	0
26	DF	(United States) Coady Andrews	7	0	1	0	8	0
34	DF	(United States) Jordan Cano	5	0	0	0	5	0
52	MF	(Ghana) Ema Twumasi	6	0	0	0	6	0
57	FW	(Ghana) Francis Atuahene	8	2	0	0	8	2

Source: Energy FC stats

=== Disciplinary record ===
No.	Pos.	Name	USL		U.S. Open Cup		Total	
No.	Pos.	Name	Booked	Sent off (straight red)	Booked	Sent off (straight red)	Booked	Sent off (straight red)
2	DF	(Jamaica) Richard Dixon	4	0	0	0	4	0
3	DF	(United States) Kyle Hyland	1	0	0	0	1	0
4	MF	(England) Callum Ross	8	0	0	0	8	0
5	DF	(United States) Christian Ibeagha	9	0	0	0	9	0
6	DF	(Canada) Drew Beckie	5	0	0	0	5	0
7	MF	(Denmark) Philip Rasmussen	3	0	0	0	3	0
8	MF	(United States) Juan Guzman	2	0	0	0	2	0
9	FW	(United States) Adam Jahn	3	0	0	0	3	0
10	FW	(Mexico) Miguel González	1	1	0	0	1	1
11	MF	(United States) Alex Dixon	2	0	0	0	2	0
13	MF	(United States) Justin Chavez	3	1	0	0	3	1
14	MF	(Spain) José Barril	6	0	1	0	7	0
15	DF	(Saint Kitts and Nevis) Atiba Harris	4	0	0	0	4	0
21	MF	(Ghana) Kalif Alhassan	1	0	0	0	1	0
22	MF	(Canada) Marco Bustos	1	0	0	0	1	0
30	GK	(United States) Matt Van Oekel	1	0	0	0	1	0
32	FW	(Jordan) Jaime Siaj	2	0	0	0	2	0
Players who left the club during the season:
9	FW	(Colombia) José Angulo	1	0	0	0	1	0
20	DF	(Ghana) Joseph Adjei	1	0	0	0	1	0
57	FW	(Ghana) Francis Atuahene	2	0	0	0	2	0

Source: Energy FC stats

=== Clean sheets ===
No.	Name	USL	U.S. Open Cup	Total	Games Played		
No.	Name	1	(Puerto Rico) Cody Laurendi	4	0	4	9
16	(United States) Bryan Byars	2	0	2	8		
30	(United States) Matt Van Oekel	3	0	3	19		

Source: Energy FC stats

== Transfers ==
=== In ===
Pos.	Player	Transferred from	Fee/notes	Date	Source
DF	(United States) Shawn McLaws	(United States) Harrisburg City Islanders	Terms of the deal were undisclosed.	December 7, 2017	
FW	(Colombia) José Angulo	(United States) Saint Louis FC	Completed permanent transfer.	December 28, 2017	
MF	(United States) Callum Ross	(United States) Charlotte Independence	Terms of the deal were undisclosed.	January 2, 2018	
GK	(United States) Matt Van Oekel	(United States) Real Salt Lake	Terms of the deal were undisclosed.	January 5, 2018	
DF	(United States) Christian Ibeagha	(United States) North Carolina FC	Terms of the deal were undisclosed.	January 15, 2018	
GK	(United States) Bryan Byars	(United States) Tulsa Roughnecks	Terms of the deal were undisclosed.	January 25, 2018	
FW	(Jordan) Jaime Siaj	(United States) Charlotte Independence	Terms of the deal were undisclosed.	February 6, 2018	
DF	(Ghana) Joseph Adjei	(Ghana) Wa All Stars	Terms of the deal were undisclosed.	February 15, 2018	
MF	(United States) Justin Chavez	(United States) Tampa Bay Rowdies	Terms of the deal were undisclosed.	February 23, 2018	
DF	(United States) Max Gunderson	(United States) OKC Energy U23	Terms of the deal were undisclosed.	February 28, 2018	
MF	(Colombia) Juan Niño	(Montenegro) FK Lovćen	Terms of the deal were undisclosed.	March 1, 2018	
FW	(United States) Christian Volesky	(United States) Saint Louis FC	Saint Louis receives an international roster spot.	May 8, 2018	
MF	(Ghana) Kalif Alhassan	(Georgia (country)) Dila Gori	Terms of the deal were undisclosed.	May 24, 2018	
DF	(Canada) Drew Beckie	(United States) Jacksonville Armada	Terms of the deal were undisclosed.	June 7, 2018	
MF	(United States) Ryley Kraft	(United States) Orlando City B	Terms of the deal were undisclosed.	June 9, 2018	
DF	(Saint Kitts and Nevis) Atiba Harris	(Mexico) Murciélagos	Terms of the deal were undisclosed.	June 27, 2018	
FW	(New Zealand) Monty Patterson	(New Zealand) Wellington Phoenix	Terms of the deal were undisclosed.	July 30, 2018	
MF	(Canada) Marco Bustos	(Canada) Vancouver Whitecaps FC	Terms of the deal were undisclosed.	August 15, 2018	
FW	(Jamaica) Deshorn Brown	(Spain) Lorca	Signed through the 2019 season.	September 18, 2018	

=== Loan in ===
Pos.	Player	Parent club	Length/Notes	Beginning	End	Source
FW	(Ghana) Francis Atuahene	(United States) FC Dallas	On a match-by-match basis.	March 2, 2018	July 28, 2018	
MF	(Ghana) Ema Twumasi	(United States) FC Dallas	On a match-by-match basis.	March 2, 2018	June 23, 2018	
DF	(United States) Jordan Cano	(United States) FC Dallas	On a match-by-match basis.	March 16, 2018	May 30, 2018	
DF	(United States) Jordan Cano	(United States) FC Dallas	On a match-by-match basis.	July 7, 2018	September 2, 2018	
FW	(United States) Adam Jahn	(United States) Columbus Crew SC	On a match-by-match basis.	July 24, 2018	October 14, 2018	

=== Out ===
Pos.	Player	Transferred to	Fee/notes	Date	Source
MF	(Wales) Chad Bond		Contract expired.	November 5, 2017	
GK	(United States) C. J. Cochran	(United States) Nashville SC	Contract expired. Signed for Nashville on December 7, 2017.	November 5, 2017	
FW	(United States) Andy Craven		Contract expired.	November 5, 2017	
DF	(United States) Michael Daly	(United States) Fresno FC	Contract expired. Signed for Fresno on December 5, 2017.	November 5, 2017	
DF	(United States) Sam Fink	(United States) Saint Louis FC	Contract expired. Signed for Saint Louis on December 13, 2017.	November 5, 2017	
MF	(United States) Daniel Gonzalez		Contract expired.	November 5, 2017	
DF	(United States) Michael Harris		Contract expired.	November 5, 2017	
GK	(United States) Jacob Lissek	(United States) Penn FC	Contract expired. Signed for Penn on February 15, 2018.	November 5, 2017	
MF	(Mexico) Luis Martinez		Contract expired.	November 5, 2017	
DF	(United States) Anthony Wallace		Contract expired.	November 5, 2017	
FW	(Poland) Wojciech Wojcik	(United States) New York Cosmos B	Contract expired. Signed for Cosmos B on March 20, 2018.	November 5, 2017	
MF	(Colombia) Juan Niño		No longer listed on roster.	May 26, 2018	
FW	(Colombia) José Angulo		Departed through mutual consent.	June 17, 2018	
DF	(United States) Coady Andrews		Retired.	June 24, 2018	
DF	(Ghana) Joseph Adjei	(Bahrain) Malkiya Club	Departed through mutual consent. Signed for Malkiya on October 7, 2018.	July 20, 2018	

== Awards ==
=== USL Team of the Week ===
Week	Starters	Bench	Opponent(s)	Link
1		(Ghana) Francis Atuahene	Tulsa Roughnecks	
10		(England) Callum Ross	Colorado Springs Switchbacks	
14	(Jordan) Jaime Siaj		Portland Timbers 2 Rio Grande Valley FC Toros	
15		(Canada) Drew Beckie	LA Galaxy II	
17		(Spain) José Barril	San Antonio FC; Colorado Springs Switchbacks	
18	(United States) Alex Dixon		Las Vegas Lights	
21	(Spain) José Barril	(United States) Alex Dixon	Tulsa Roughnecks; Real Monarchs	
23	(United States) Alex Dixon	(United States) Christian Volesky	Rio Grande Valley FC Toros	
24		(Spain) José Barril	Seattle Sounders FC 2	
27		(England) Callum Ross	LA Galaxy II	
29	(Puerto Rico) Cody Laurendi		Las Vegas Lights	

=== USL Save of the Week ===
Week	Player	Opponent	Link
25	(Puerto Rico) Cody Laurendi	Swope Park Rangers	

== Kits ==
Home	Away

Type	Shirt	Shorts	Socks	First appearance / Record
Home	White	White	White	Match 1 vs. Tulsa / 9–5–13
Away	Blue	Blue	Blue	Match 12 vs. Reno / 3–2–3

== See also ==
- OKC Energy FC
- 2018 in American soccer
- 2018 USL season
