= 2017 Charlotte Independence season =

Charlotte Independence
2017 season
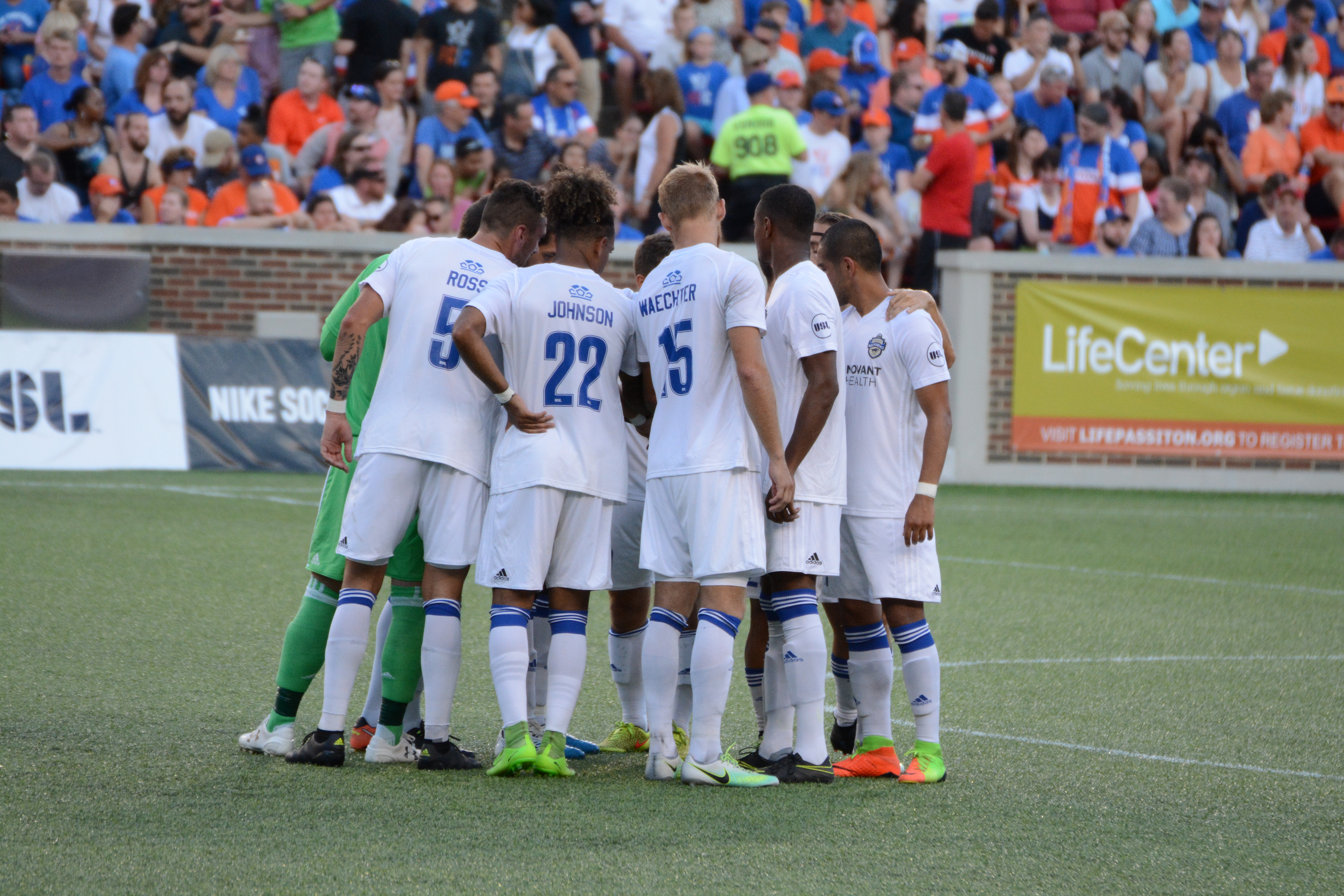
- Charlotte huddle prior to a June, 2017 USLC match vs. FC Cincinnati at Nippert Stadium
- President: Jim McPhilliamy
- Head coach: Mike Jeffries
- Stadium: Sportsplex at Matthews
- USL: Conference: 5th
- USL Playoffs: Conference Quarterfinals
- U.S. Open Cup: Third round
- Highest home attendance: 2,648 (6/17 vs. HAR)
- Lowest home attendance: 801 (5/11 vs. NY)
- Average home league attendance: 1,615
- Biggest win: CLT 5–1 NY (5/11); CLT 5–1 STL (7/15); BST 0–4 CLT (7/29)
- Biggest defeat: ROC 4–0 CLT (4/29)
Home colors	Away colors

The 2017 Charlotte Independence season was the club's third season of existence, and their third in the United Soccer League, the second tier of American soccer.

== Competitions ==
=== Regular season ===
==== Standings ====
Eastern Conference

Pos	Team	Pld	W	D	L	GF	GA	GD	Pts	Qualification
3	Tampa Bay Rowdies	32	14	11	7	50	35	+15	53	Conference Playoffs
4	Rochester Rhinos	32	14	11	7	36	28	+8	53	Conference Playoffs
5	Charlotte Independence	32	13	9	10	52	40	+12	48	Conference Playoffs
6	FC Cincinnati	32	12	10	10	46	48	−2	46	Conference Playoffs
7	New York Red Bulls II	32	13	5	14	57	60	−3	44	Conference Playoffs

Source: 2017 USL standings
Rules for classification: 1) total wins; 2) total goal differential; 3) total goals scored; 4) points earned against top four Conference finishers; 5) disciplinary points; 6) coin toss or drawing of lots

==== Match results ====
Win Draw Loss

All times in Eastern Time.

April 1 1	Charlotte Independence	0–2	Charleston Battery	Matthews, North Carolina
6:00 PM EDT	Johnson (yellow card) 42'; Duckett (yellow card) 49'; Ross (yellow card) 68'	Report	Lasso (yellow card) 32' (goal) 77'; Williams 70'	Stadium: Sportsplex at Matthews; Attendance: 2,048; Referee: Kevin Broadley

April 8 2	Orlando City B	1–1	Charlotte Independence	Orlando, Florida
6:30 PM EDT	Kraft (yellow card) 11'; Ellis-Hayden (yellow card) 50'; Laryea (yellow card) 66'; Dikwa 70', (yellow card) 90+1'; Schweitzer (yellow card) 75'	Report	Ross (yellow card) 20'; Hilton 60'; Herrera (yellow card) 79'	Stadium: Orlando City Stadium; Attendance: 1,512; Referee: Esteban Rosano

April 15 3	Charlotte Independence	1–1	Pittsburgh Riverhounds	Rock Hill, South Carolina
7:00 PM EDT	Herrera 7' (pen.)	Report	Banjo 2'; Earls (yellow card) 19'; Greenspan (yellow card) 78'	Stadium: Eagle Field; Attendance: 1,030; Referee: Eric Usher

April 22 4	Saint Louis FC	1–2	Charlotte Independence	Fenton, Missouri
8:30 PM EDT	Angulo 4'; Walls (yellow card) 59'; Ledbetter (yellow card) 71'; Cochran (yellow card) 85'	Report (USL)	E. Martínez 8', 29', (yellow card) 70'; Johnson (yellow card) 78'	Stadium: World Wide Technology Soccer Park; Attendance: 4,107; Referee: Guido Gonzalez

April 29 5	Rochester Rhinos	4–0	Charlotte Independence	Rochester, New York
5:05 PM EDT	Fall 27', (yellow card) 48'; Garzi (yellow card) 44', (goal) 46'; Madison 52'; Felix (yellow card) 56'; Forbes 85' (pen.)	Report	Davidson (yellow card) 25'; Johnson (yellow card) 37'; Herrera (yellow card) 90+2'	Stadium: Capelli Sport Stadium; Attendance: 1,941; Referee: Greg Dopka

May 11 6	Charlotte Independence	5–1	New York Red Bulls II	Charlotte, North Carolina
7:00 PM EDT	Herrera 39'; Ross 43'; Martínez 51'; Estrada 82'; Siaj 90+2'	Report	Flemmings 21'	Stadium: Ramblewood Soccer Complex; Attendance: 801; Referee: Danielle Chesky

May 27 7	Orlando City B	1–3	Charlotte Independence	Orlando, Florida
6:30 PM EDT	Dikwa 20'; Laryea (yellow card) 53'; Rocha (yellow card) 78'	Report	Smith (yellow card) 14'; A. Martinez (yellow card) 28'; Estrada 40'; Ross (yellow card) 42'; E. Martinez 45'; Herrera 51'; Johnson (yellow card) 69'	Stadium: Orlando City Stadium; Attendance: 1,098; Referee: Ismir Pekmic

June 4 8	Charlotte Independence	2–2	Tampa Bay Rowdies	Rock Hill, South Carolina
7:00 PM EDT	Martínez (yellow card) 45+3'; Castillo 51', 56'	Report	Hristov 25' (pen.), (yellow card) 27'; Mkandawire (yellow card) 35'; Boden (yellow card) 71'; Savage 83', (yellow card) 86'	Stadium: Eagle Field; Attendance: 1,216; Referee: Dule Djurasevic

June 7 9	Louisville City FC	1–0	Charlotte Independence	Louisville, Kentucky
7:30 PM EDT	DelPiccolo (yellow card) 11'; Ballard 57'; Smith (yellow card) 74'; Jimenez (yellow card) 86'; Ranjitsingh (yellow card) 90+3'	Report	Ross (yellow card) 9'; Fairclough (yellow card) 20', (yellow card) 48' (red card); Ekra (yellow card) 42'; Siaj (yellow card) 90'	Stadium: Louisville Slugger Field; Attendance: 7,403; Referee: Rosendo Mendoza

June 10 10	FC Cincinnati	1–1	Charlotte Independence	Cincinnati, Ohio
7:00 PM EDT	K. Walker (yellow card) 43'; Hoyte 45'	Report	E. Martínez (yellow card) 17', (yellow card) 90' (red card); A. Martínez 18'; Waechter (yellow card) 56'	Stadium: Nippert Stadium; Attendance: 21,115; Referee: Bardhyl Pashaj; Assistant referees: Art Arustamyan; Kyle Maust; Fourth official: Noah Matos

June 17 11	Charlotte Independence	2–0	Harrisburg City Islanders	Matthews, North Carolina
7:00 PM EDT	Hererra 13', 61'	Report	Nishanian (yellow card) 74'; Thomas (yellow card) 81'	Stadium: Sportsplex at Matthews; Attendance: 2,648; Referee: Dustin Thorne

June 24 12	Richmond Kickers	0–2	Charlotte Independence	Richmond, Virginia
7:00 PM EDT	Luiz Fernando (yellow card) 47'; Durkin (yellow card) 86'	Report	Martínez 45' (pen.), 57'	Stadium: City Stadium; Attendance: 4,423; Referee: Greg Dopka

July 1 13	Charlotte Independence	2–1	Rochester Rhinos	Charlotte, North Carolina
6:00 P.M. EDT	Estrada 12', 25'; Ross (yellow card) 32'	Report	Farrell (yellow card) 14'; Fall 67' (pen.)	Stadium: Sportsplex at Matthews; Attendance: 1,623; Referee: Gustavo Solorio

July 4 14	Pittsburgh Riverhounds	1–3	Charlotte Independence	Pittsburgh, Pennsylvania
7:00 PM EDT	Agbossoumonde (yellow card) 61'; Chevy (yellow card) 65', (goal) 90+1'	Report	E. Martínez 40'; Herrera 62' (pen.), 79'; Johnson (yellow card) 71'	Stadium: Highmark Stadium; Attendance: 4,006; Referee: Lukasz Szpala

July 8 15	Charlotte Independence	5–1	Saint Louis FC	Matthews, North Carolina
7:00 PM EDT	Herrera 14', 30', 61' (pen.); E. Martínez 39', (yellow card) 46'; Davidson (yellow card) 50'; Duckett 78'; Hilton (yellow card) 83'	Report	Guzman 57'; Stanley (yellow card) 59'; Dalgaard (yellow card) 77'; Alihodžić (red card) 85'	Stadium: Sportsplex at Matthews; Attendance: 1,637; Referee: Jose Lara

July 15 16	New York Red Bulls II	2–3	Charlotte Independence	Montclair, New Jersey
4:00 PM EDT	Ndam (yellow card) 20'; Abidor (yellow card) 51'; Najem 82'; Flemmings 85'	Report	Herrera 21'; Ndam 45+1' (o.g.); Martinez 53'; Johnson (yellow card) 64'; Estrada (yellow card) 90+3'	Stadium: MSU Soccer Park; Attendance: 505; Referee: Rubiel Vazquez

July 18 17	Harrisburg City Islanders	1–1	Charlotte Independence	Harrisburg, Pennsylvania
7:00 PM EDT	Mensah 45+3'; McLaws (yellow card) 60'; Olabiyi (yellow card) 90+2'	Report	Herrera 51'	Stadium: FNB Field; Attendance: 1,856; Referee: Charles Murphy

July 26 18	Charlotte Independence	0–0	Richmond Kickers	Matthews, North Carolina
7:00 PM EDT	Martinez (yellow card) 5'; Johnson (yellow card) 90'	Report	Asante (yellow card) 24'; Troyer (yellow card) 44'	Stadium: Sportsplex at Matthews; Attendance: 1,384; Referee: Christina Unkel

July 29 19	Bethlehem Steel FC	0–4	Charlotte Independence	Bethlehem, Pennsylvania
5:00 PM EDT	Chambers (yellow card) 49'; Fontana (yellow card) 51'; Nanco (yellow card) 65'; Jones (red card) 73'	Report	Hilton 7', 48'; Herrera 19'; Johnson (yellow card) 32'; Martínez (yellow card) 45+2', (goal) 80'; Mizell (yellow card) 72'; Duckett (yellow card) 90+2'	Stadium: Goodman Stadium; Attendance: 3,210; Referee: Henrik Karlsson

August 5 20	Charlotte Independence	3–1	Louisville City FC	Matthews, North Carolina
7:00 PM EDT	Martinez 11', 44', 88', (yellow card) 1', (yellow card) 80' (red card); Kalungi (yellow card) 65'; Martinez (yellow card) 68'	Report	Kaye 48', (yellow card) 90+2'; Smith (yellow card) 40'; DelPiccolo (yellow card) 68'; Williams (yellow card) 68'; Craig (yellow card) 75'	Stadium: Sportsplex at Matthews; Attendance: 2,648; Referee: Christopher Spivey

August 9 21	Toronto FC II	2–2	Charlotte Independence	Toronto, Ontario
7:30 PM EDT	Hamilton 49', 90+2'; Fraser (yellow card) 88'	Report	Pais 62' (o.g.); Smith (red card) 65'; Siaj 79'	Stadium: BMO Field; Attendance: 1,000; Referee: Marie-Soleil Beaudoin

August 12 22	Ottawa Fury	3–1	Charlotte Independence	Ottawa, Ontario
7:00 PM EDT	Rozeboom (yellow card) 5'; Edward 37'; Bruna 52'; Reid 87'	Report	Johnson (yellow card) 36'; Siaj (yellow card) 61'; Spies 75'	Stadium: TD Place Stadium; Attendance: 4,360; Referee: Carol Anne Chénard

August 16 23	Charlotte Independence	1–0	Bethlehem Steel FC	Matthews, North Carolina
7:00 PM EDT	Martínez 33'; Ross (yellow card) 53'; Smith (yellow card) 74'	Report	Chambers (yellow card) 15'	Stadium: Sportsplex at Matthews; Attendance: 1,312; Referee: Ismir Pekmic

August 19 24	Charlotte Independence	1–1	Orlando City B	Charlotte, North Carolina
6:00 PM EDT	Estrada 7'	Report	Barry 5' (pen.), (yellow card) 90+2'; Clowes (yellow card) 53'; Carroll (yellow card) 56'	Stadium: Sportsplex at Matthews; Attendance: 1,467; Referee: Greg Dopka

August 26 25	Charlotte Independence	2–3	Toronto FC II	Matthews, North Carolina
7:00 PM EDT	E. Martínez 21'; Siaj 32'; A. Martínez (red card) 49'; Kalungi (yellow card) 64'	Report	Taintor (yellow card) 14'; Onkony (yellow card) 55'; Morgan 69'; Spencer 71'; Hamilton 76'; James (yellow card) 81'; Cavalluzzo (yellow card) 86'	Stadium: Sportsplex at Matthews; Attendance: 1,429; Referee: Dustin Thorne

September 2 26	Charlotte Independence	3–0	Richmond Kickers	Matthews, North Carolina
7:00 PM EDT	Siaj 3'; Martinez 60' (pen.), 90'	Report	Oscar (yellow card) 15'; Lee (yellow card) 39'; Roberts (yellow card) 70'; Durkin (yellow card) 76'; Worra (yellow card) 90'	Stadium: Sportsplex at Matthews; Attendance: 1,329; Referee: Gustavo Solorio

September 16 27	Charlotte Independence	1–1	Ottawa Fury	Charlotte, North Carolina
7:00 PM EDT	Smith (yellow card) 45'; Estrada (yellow card) 65'; Hilton 89'	Report	Dixon 11', (yellow card) 42'; Del Campo (yellow card) 36'; Dos Santos (yellow card) 38'; Edward (yellow card) 49'; Hume (yellow card) 68'	Stadium: Sportsplex at Matthews; Attendance: 1,830; Referee: Mark Kadlecik

September 20 28	Charleston Battery	3–0	Charlotte Independence	Charleston, South Carolina
6:00 PM EDT	Hackshaw (yellow card) 6'; Cordoves 13', 80'; Lasso (yellow card) 18'; Garbanzo 73'	Report	Waechter (yellow card) 21'; Ekra (yellow card) 55'	Stadium: MUSC Health Stadium; Attendance: 2,020; Referee: Dallas Rosier

September 23 29	Tampa Bay Rowdies	1–0	Charlotte Independence	St. Petersburg, Florida
7:30 PM EDT	Gorskie 33'; Chavez (yellow card) 45+1'; Restrepo (yellow card) 75'; Guenzatti (yellow card) 83'; Nanchoff (yellow card) 90'	Report	Herrera (yellow card) 36'; Johnson (yellow card) 37'; Ekra (yellow card) 86'	Stadium: Al Lang Stadium; Attendance: 7,786; Referee: Rosendo Mendoza

September 29 30	Charlotte Independence	0–1	FC Cincinnati	Charlotte, North Carolina
7:00 PM EDT	Martínez (yellow card) 38'	Report	Schindler 75'; Walker (yellow card) 46', (yellow card) 89' (red card)	Stadium: Sportsplex at Matthews; Attendance: 1,577; Referee: Bardhyl Pashaj

October 7 31	Louisville City FC	2–1	Charlotte Independence	Louisville, Kentucky
7:30 PM EDT	Abend (yellow card) 19'; Totsch (yellow card) 23'; Smith (yellow card) 29' (goal) 77'; Davis IV (yellow card) 37' (goal) 61'; Craig (yellow card) 51'; Ownby (yellow card) 90+2'	Report	Siaj (yellow card) 23'; Hilton (yellow card) 42'; Calvert 66'; Spies (yellow card) 82'	Stadium: Louisville Slugger Field; Attendance: 7,357; Referee: Lukasz Szpala

October 14 32	Charlotte Independence	0–1	Charleston Battery	Matthews, North Carolina
6:00 PM EDT		Report	Guerra 35'; Griffith (yellow card) 42'; Mueller (yellow card) 72'; Portillo (yellow card) 83'; Rittmeyer (yellow card) 90+3'	Stadium: Sportsplex at Matthews; Attendance: 1,864; Referee: Daniel Gutierrez

==== Playoffs ====
October 21 Conference Quarterfinals	Rochester Rhinos	2–1 (a.e.t.)	Charlotte Independence	Rochester, New York
6:05 PM EDT	Dover (yellow card) 11'; Graf 53'; François (yellow card) 61'; Farrell (yellow card) 83'; Defregger 113'	Report	A. Martínez (yellow card) 53', (yellow card) (red card) 120'; E. Martínez 69'; Davidson (yellow card) 85'	Stadium: Capelli Sport Stadium; Attendance: 1,647; Referee: Bardhyl Pashaj

=== U.S. Open Cup ===
May 17 Second round	Charlotte Eagles	2–3	Charlotte Independence	Charlotte, North Carolina
7:00 PM EDT	Williams 61'; Omondi 63'	Report	Townsend 10'; Martínez 77' (pen.), 88'	Stadium: Charlotte Christian School; Attendance: 602; Referee: Patrick Schmidt

May 31, 2017 Third Round	North Carolina FC	4–1	Charlotte Independence	Cary
19:30 EDT	Marcelin 17'; Laing (yellow card) 45+1'; Albadawi 51', 82'; Sylvestre (yellow card) 63'; Tobin 83'	Report	E.Martínez (yellow card) 24'; Kalungi (yellow card) 45'; A.Martínez 90+2' (pen.) (yellow card) 90+5'	Stadium: WakeMed Soccer Park; Attendance: 2,052; Referee: Kevin Broadley
