= 2019 Saint Louis FC season =

Saint Louis FC
2019 season
- Owner: SLSG Pro LLC
- Head coach: Anthony Pulis
- United Soccer League: Western Conference: 11th
- USL Playoffs: Did not qualify
- U.S. Open Cup: Quarter-finals
- Kings' Cup: Runner-up
- Highest home attendance: League/All: 5,963 (June 22 vs. North Carolina FC)
- Lowest home attendance: League: 3,524 (September 4 vs. Ottawa Fury FC); All: 1,206 (May 29 vs. Forward Madison FC, USOC )
- Average home league attendance: 4,532
- Biggest win: 3–0 (July 27 vs. Bethlehem Steel)
- Biggest defeat: 1–4 (July 20 at Tampa Bay Rowdies)
Home colors	Away colors

The 2019 Saint Louis FC season was the club's fifth season of existence, and their fifth consecutive season in the USL Championship, the second tier of American soccer. Saint Louis will additionally compete in the U.S. Open Cup.

Saint Louis moved back to the Eastern Conference this season, after spending 2018 in the Western Conference.

== Roster ==
As of August 23, 2019

No.	Position	Nation	Player
1	GK	USA	Tomas Gomez
2	DF	USA	Matt Bahner
3	DF	COD	Phanuel Kavita
4	DF	USA	Sam Fink
5	DF	CAN	Paris Gee
6	DF	FRA	Bradley Kamdem
7	MF	USA	Audi Jepson
8	MF	ENG	Lewis Hilton
9	FW	USA	Russell Cicerone
10	FW	CMR	Albert Dikwa
11	FW	ESA	Joaquín Rivas
12	MF	ISR	Guy Abend
13	MF	USA	Kadeem Dacres
14	FW	ENG	Tyler Blackwood
15	DF	USA	Sean Reynolds
17	MF	GHA	Oscar Umar
18	FW	USA	Caleb Calvert
20	MF	PER	Collin Fernandez
21	MF	USA	Matt Thomas
22	FW	USA	Kyle Greig
24	GK	USA	Jake Fenlason
26	DF	USA	Lawson Redmon
27	DF	USA	Jansen Miller
28	MF	USA	Kipp Keller
29	MF	USA	Nichi Vlastos
30	GK	USA	Patrick Schulte
99	MF	CAN	Masta Kacher

Saint Louis FC academy player.

== Competitions ==
=== Preseason ===
February 9 Friendly	OKC Energy FC	0–0	Saint Louis FC	Springfield, Missouri
2:00 PM CST		Report		Stadium: Betty and Bobby Allison South Stadium

February 13 Friendly	Austin Bold FC	1–1	Saint Louis FC	Texas
	68'	Report	Greig 45'	Attendance: Closed-door
Note: Match played with three periods of 30 minutes each

February 13 Friendly	Lone Star Academy U-19	1–1	Saint Louis FC	Texas
	15'	Report	Dikwa 9'	Attendance: Closed-door
Note: 30-minute match

February 16 Friendly	San Antonio FC	0–0	Saint Louis FC	San Antonio, Texas
11:00 AM CST		Report		Stadium: Toyota Field; Attendance: Closed-door
Note: Doubleheader. 60-minute match.

February 16 Friendly	San Antonio FC	1–0	Saint Louis FC	San Antonio, Texas
CST	(o.g.)	Report		Stadium: Toyota Field; Attendance: Closed-door
Note: Doubleheader. 60-minute match.

February 23 Friendly	Saint Louis FC	3–1	Tulsa Roughnecks FC	Fenton, Missouri
1:00 PM CST	Rivas 34' (pen.); Reynolds 50'; Trialist 57'	Report	Rodrigo 23'	Stadium: Toyota Stadium

February 24 Friendly	Saint Louis FC	3–0	Memphis 901 FC	Fenton, Missouri
1:00 PM CST	Dacres 23', 79'; Greig 27'	Report		Stadium: Toyota Stadium

March 2 Friendly	Saint Louis FC	1–0	Forward Madison FC	Fenton, Missouri
1:00 PM CST	Dacres 28'	Report		Stadium: Toyota Stadium

=== USL Championship ===
==== Standings ====
Pos	Team	Pld	W	D	L	GF	GA	GD	Pts	Qualification
9	Charleston Battery	34	11	13	10	44	44	0	46	Play-In Round
10	Birmingham Legion FC	34	12	7	15	35	51	−16	43	Play-In Round
11	Saint Louis FC	34	11	9	14	40	41	−1	42	
12	Loudoun United FC	34	11	6	17	59	65	−6	39	
13	Charlotte Independence	34	9	11	14	42	53	−11	38	

Source: USL Championship Standings
Rules for classification: 1) total wins; 2) total goal differential; 3) total goals scored; 4) points earned against top four Conference finishers; 5) disciplinary points; 6) coin toss or drawing of lots

==== Results summary ====
Overall								Home						Away					
Pld	W	D	L	GF	GA	GD	Pts	W	D	L	GF	GA	GD	W	D	L	GF	GA	GD
34	11	9	14	40	41	−1	42	8	6	3	25	16	+9	3	3	11	15	25	−10

Source: Standings

==== Results by round ====
Round	1	2	3	4	5	6	7	8	9	10	11	12	13	14	15	16	17	18	19	20	21	22	23	24	25	26	27	28	29	30	31	32	33	34
Stadium	H	A	H	H	A	H	A	H	H	A	A	H	A	A	H	A	H	A	A	H	A	H	A	A	H	H	A	H	A	H	H	A	H	A
Result	W	W	D	W	W	L	D	W	W	D	D	D	L	L	D	L	D	L	L	W	L	D	L	L	W	W	W	W	L	D	L	L	L	L

Source: Saint Louis schedule
A = Away; H = Home; W = Win; D = Draw; L = Loss; P = Postponed

==== Match results ====
On December 19, 2018, the USL announced their 2019 season schedule.

All times in Central Time unless otherwise noted.

March 9 1	Saint Louis FC	2–1	Indy Eleven	Fenton, Missouri
1:00 PM	Kavita 69'; Fink (yellow card) 72'; Cicerone 76'	Report	Hackshaw (yellow card) 57', (goal) 61'; Barrett (yellow card) 64'	Stadium: Toyota Stadium; Attendance: 4,561; Referee: Rosendo Mendoza

March 16 2	Nashville SC	0–1	Saint Louis FC	Nashville, Tennessee
7:00 PM	Moloto (yellow card) 32'	Report	Kavita (yellow card) 62'; Umar (yellow card) 71'; Calvert 84'	Stadium: Nissan Stadium; Attendance: 6,070; Referee: Eric Tattersall

March 23 3	Saint Louis FC	1–1	Tampa Bay Rowdies	Fenton, Missouri
1:00 PM	Dacres (yellow card) 22'; Fink 26'	Report	Diakité (yellow card) 63'; Morad (yellow card) 73'; Guenzatti 76' (pen.)	Stadium: Toyota Stadium; Attendance: 4,037; Referee: Ismir Pekmic

March 30 4	Saint Louis FC	1–0	Charlotte Independence	Fenton, Missouri
1:00 PM	Greig 5'	Report	Taku (yellow card) 44'; Johnson (yellow card) 63'; Herrera (yellow card) 82'	Stadium: Toyota Stadium; Attendance: 3,778; Referee: Lorant Varga

April 6 5	Atlanta United 2	0–2	Saint Louis FC	Kennesaw, Georgia
6:30 PM	Williams (yellow card) 40'	Report	Fink 9' (pen.); Cicerone 20'; Hilton (yellow card) 88'	Stadium: Fifth Third Bank Stadium; Attendance: 2,640; Referee: Sergii Demianchuk

April 13 6	Saint Louis FC	2–3	Birmingham Legion FC	Fenton, Missouri
7:30 PM	Abend (yellow card) 37'; Rivas 63'; Fink 88' (pen.)	Report	Lopez (yellow card) 14'; Laurent 38'; Williams 75', 81'; Fisher (yellow card) 78'; Opoku (yellow card) 87'	Stadium: Toyota Stadium; Attendance: 3,635; Referee: Jervis Atagana

April 20 7	Pittsburgh Riverhounds SC	0–0	Saint Louis FC	Pittsburgh, Pennsylvania
6:00 PM	Greenspan (yellow card) 29' dos Santos (yellow card) 40'; Dover (yellow card) 58'; Vancaeyezeele (yellow card) 90+3'	Report		Stadium: Highmark Stadium; Attendance: 2,150; Referee: Eric Tattersall

April 27 8	Saint Louis FC	3–1	Swope Park Rangers	Fenton, Missouri
7:30 PM	Jepson 42'; Cicerone 47'; Greig (yellow card) 82', (goal) 84'	Report	Andrade 65'; Colombie (yellow card) 80'	Stadium: Toyota Stadium; Attendance: 4,076; Referee: Lukasz Szpala

May 4 9	Saint Louis FC	—	Ottawa Fury FC	Fenton, Missouri
7:30 PM				Stadium: Toyota Stadium; Referee: Elijio Arreguin
Note: Postponed due to flooding.

May 11 10	Charleston Battery	0–0	Saint Louis FC	Charleston, South Carolina
6:30 PM	Piggott (yellow card) 51'; Candela (yellow card) 55'; Nelson (yellow card) 63'; Mueller (yellow card) 90+3'	Report	Bahner (yellow card) 24'; Umar (yellow card) 89'	Stadium: MUSC Health Stadium; Attendance: 1,879; Referee: Luis Guardia

May 18 11	Louisville City FC	0–0	Saint Louis FC	Louisville, Kentucky
6:00 PM	Jimenez (yellow card) 41'; Craig (yellow card) 80'; Francis (yellow card) 90'; Williams (yellow card) 90+2'	Report	Abend (yellow card) 35'	Stadium: Louisville Slugger Field; Attendance: 9,688; Referee: Guido Gonzales, Jr.

June 1 12	Saint Louis FC	—	Memphis 901 FC	Fenton, Missouri
1:00 PM		Report		Stadium: Toyota Stadium; Referee: Matthew Franz
Note: Match postponed due to severe weather.

June 8 13	Hartford Athletic	2–1	Saint Louis FC	East Hartford, Connecticut
6:00 PM	Swartz 27'; Rasmussen 85' (pen.); Downs (yellow card) 86'	Report	Bahner 16'; Abend (yellow card) 79'	Stadium: Rentschler Field; Referee: John Griggs

June 15 14	Bethlehem Steel FC	3–1	Saint Louis FC	Philadelphia, Pennsylvania
7:00 PM CDT	Chambers 19', (yellow card) 26'; Moumbagna 25', (red card) 27'; Cortés 37'; Fontana (yellow card) 56'	Report	Kamdem (yellow card) 18'; Hilton (yellow card) 58'; Umar (yellow card) 63' (yellow-red card) 81'; Greig (yellow card) 74'; Calvert (yellow card) 74'; Dacres 85'	Stadium: McCarthy Stadium; Attendance: 222; Referee: Luis Guardia

June 22 15	Saint Louis FC	2–2	North Carolina FC	Fenton, Missouri
7:30 PM	Dikwa 47'; Cicerone (yellow card) 62'; Fink 90+1' (pen.)	Report	Ewolo 32'; Fortune (yellow card) 46'; Miller 81'	Stadium: Toyota Stadium; Attendance: 5,963; Referee: Jon Freemon

June 30 16	Swope Park Rangers	2–1	Saint Louis FC	Kansas City, Kansas
4:00 PM	Hernandez 21', (red card) 90'; Smith (yellow card) 45'; Mbekeli (yellow card) 69'; Vanacore-Decker 82'; Segbers (yellow card) 90'	Report	Martz (yellow card) 45+3'; Dacres 78'; Kamdem (yellow card) 90+1'	Stadium: Children's Mercy Park; Attendance: 531; Referee: Lorant Varga

July 6 17	Saint Louis FC	2–2	Loudoun United FC	Fenton, Missouri
7:30 PM	Hilton (yellow card) 55'; Greig 57'; Cicerone 73'; Umar (yellow card) 88'	Report	K. Murphy 41'; Martinez 51', (yellow card) 66'; Ward (yellow card) 82'	Stadium: Toyota Stadium; Attendance: 4,564; Referee: Adam Kilpatrick

July 13 18	Charlotte Independence	2–1	Saint Louis FC	Matthews, North Carolina
7:00 PM EDT	Jackson 5'; Mansally (yellow card) 36'; Martínez 49'; Johnson (red card) 80'	Report	Dacres (yellow card) 51'; Hilton (yellow card) 68'; Calvert 75'	Stadium: Sportsplex at Matthews; Attendance: 2,007; Referee: Kevin Broadley

July 20 19	Tampa Bay Rowdies	4–1	Saint Louis FC	St. Petersburg, Florida
6:30 PM	Guenzatti 33', 36'; Oduro (yellow card) 69'; Fernandes 79'; Richards 90+1'	Report	Calvert (yellow card) 20'; Hilton (yellow card) 71'; Greig 87'	Stadium: Al Lang Stadium; Attendance: 4,520; Referee: Sergii Demianchuk

July 27 20	Saint Louis FC	3–0	Bethlehem Steel FC	Fenton, Missouri
7:30 PM	Umar (yellow card) 29'; Greig 41'; Hilton 48'; Dacres 49'	Report	Willis (yellow card) 56'; McKenzie (yellow card) 78'	Stadium: Toyota Stadium; Attendance: 4,225; Referee: Matthew Thompson

August 2 21	New York Red Bulls II	2–0	Saint Louis FC	Montclair, New Jersey
6:00 PM	Elney 34', 89'; Stroud (yellow card) 69'; Tolkin (yellow card) 74'	Report	Kacher (yellow card) 13'; Umar (yellow card) 32', (red card) 88'; Greig (yellow card) 39'; Calvert (yellow card) 75'	Stadium: MSU Soccer Park; Attendance: 756; Referee: Greg Dopka

August 6 12	Saint Louis FC	0–0	Memphis 901 FC	Fenton, Missouri
7:30 PM	Kamdem (yellow card) 70'	Report	Lindley (red card) 27'; Charpie (yellow card) 75'; Burch (yellow card) 78'; Mohamed (yellow card) 84'	Stadium: Toyota Stadium; Attendance: 5,179; Referee: Jon Freemon
Note: Replay of June 1 match postponed due to severe weather.

August 10 22	Saint Louis FC	1–1	Charleston Battery	Fenton, Missouri
7:30 PM	Fink 68' (pen.); Kamdem (yellow card) 88'	Report	Candela (yellow card) 3' van Schaik 37', (yellow card) 81'; Svantesson (yellow card) 63'; Anunga (yellow card) 67'; Archer (red card) 80'; Woodbine (yellow card) 81'	Stadium: Toyota Stadium; Attendance: 4,085; Referee: Malik Badawi

August 18 23	Indy Eleven	2–1	Saint Louis FC	Indianapolis, Indiana
6:00 PM	Pasher 67'; Kelly 81'; Conner (yellow card) 84'	Report	Fernandez (yellow card) 75'; Hilton 90+2'	Stadium: Lucas Oil Stadium; Attendance: 10,035; Referee: Elton García

August 24 24	Ottawa Fury FC	2–1	Saint Louis FC	Ottawa, Ontario
1:00 PM	Haworth 10'; Barry 34'; Fall (yellow card) 56'; François (yellow card) 90+5'	Report	Umar (yellow card) 14' (yellow-red card) 47'; Kavita (yellow card) 56'; Fink 71' (pen.); Reynolds (yellow card) 87'	Stadium: TD Place Stadium; Attendance: 5,504; Referee: Fabrizio Stasolla

September 1 25	Saint Louis FC	3–2	Hartford Athletic	Fenton, Missouri
7:30 PM	Darces 16'; Greig 38', 65'; Reynolds (yellow card) 59'; Bahner (yellow card) 71'	Report	Reynolds 29' (o.g.); Dalgaard 67'; Barrera (yellow card) 75'; Angulo (red card) 90+6'	Stadium: Toyota Stadium; Attendance: 4,068; Referee: Lukasz Szpala

September 4 9	Saint Louis FC	1–0	Ottawa Fury FC	Fenton, Missouri
7:00 PM	Abend (yellow card) 35'; Fernandez (yellow card) 63'; Blackwood 80'	Report	Tissot (yellow card) 45+4'; Thiago (yellow card) 88'	Stadium: Toyota Stadium; Attendance: 3,524; Referee: Victor Rivas
Note: Replay of May 4 match postponed due to severe weather.

September 7 26	Saint Louis FC	1–0	Nashville SC	Fenton, Missouri
7:30 PM	Gee (yellow card) 12'; Umar (yellow card) 67'; Cicerone 77'	Report	LaGrassa (yellow card) 42'	Stadium: Toyota Stadium; Attendance: 5,284; Referee: Thomas Snyder

September 13 27	Birmingham Legion	0–2	Saint Louis FC	Birmingham, AL
7:00 PM CDT	Ward (yellow card) 38'; Asiedu (yellow card) 74'; Lopez (yellow card) 79'	Report	Bahner (yellow card) 22'; Blackwood 42', 72'; Kavita (yellow card) 62'; Greig (yellow card) 75'	Stadium: BBVA Field; Referee: Adam Kilpatrick

September 18 28	Saint Louis FC	2–0	New York Red Bulls II	Fenton, Missouri
7:30 PM	Blackwood 3'; Darces (yellow card) 45+1'; Fink 70' (pen.)	Report	Stroud (yellow card) 25'; Louro (yellow card) 70'; Boateng (yellow card) 70'	Stadium: Toyota Stadium; Attendance: 5,462; Referee: Elvis Osmanovic

September 21 29	Memphis 901 FC	1–0	Saint Louis FC	Memphis, Tennessee
7:00 PM	Epps (yellow card) 43', (goal) 54'; Paul (yellow card) 60'; Allen (yellow card) 75'; Morton (yellow card) 84'	Report	Cicerone (yellow card) 40'; Fernandez (yellow card) 85'	Stadium: Autozone Park; Attendance: 6,701; Referee: Dejan Susak

September 28 30	Saint Louis FC	1–1	Atlanta United 2	Fenton, Missouri
8:30 PM	Blackwood 67'; Kacher (yellow card) 75'	Report	Bashti 72'; Metcalf (yellow card) 88'	Stadium: World Wide Technology Soccer Park; Attendance: 4,812; Referee: Elijio Arreguin

October 5 31	Saint Louis FC	0–1	Louisville City FC	Fenton, Missouri
7:30 PM	Kamdem (yellow card) 51'	Report	Rasmussen 12'	Stadium: Toyota Stadium; Attendance: 4,512; Referee: Guido Gonzales, Jr.

October 9 32	Loudoun United FC	4–3	Saint Louis FC	Leesburg, Virginia
6:30 PM	Ndour 47'; Murphy 60'; Doue (yellow card) 75'; A. Bustamante 80'; Amoh (yellow card) 90+2', (goal) 90+3'	Report	Hilton 35', 67'; Blackwood 63'; Fink (yellow card) 90+5'	Stadium: Loudoun United Stadium; Attendance: 631; Referee: Sergii Demianchuk

October 12 33	Saint Louis FC	0–1	Pittsburgh Riverhounds SC	Fenton, Missouri
8:30 PM EDT	Abend (yellow card) 44'; Kavita (yellow card) 51'; Kamdem (yellow card) 59'	Report	Dos Santos 88', (yellow card) 90+6'	Stadium: Toyota Stadium; Attendance: 5,273; Referee: Jon Freemon

October 19 34	North Carolina FC	1–0	Saint Louis FC	Cary, North Carolina
6:00 PM	da Luz (yellow card) 50'; Kristo 90'	Report	Reynolds (yellow card) 89'	Stadium: Sahlen's Stadium at WakeMed Soccer Park; Attendance: 5,982; Referee: Ismir Pekmic

=== U.S. Open Cup ===
As a member of the USL Championship, Saint Louis FC entered the tournament in the Second Round, played on May 14–15, 2019.

May 15 Second Round	Des Moines Menace (Iowa)	1–1 (a.e.t.) (1–3 p)	(Missouri) Saint Louis FC	Des Moines, Iowa
7:30 pm CDT	Perea 39' (pen.); Easterling (yellow card) 40' (yellow-red card) 90+2'; Chávez (yellow card) 53' (yellow-red card) 120+4'; Bakayoko (yellow card) 90+6'; Bell (yellow card) 126'	Report	Umar (yellow card) 7'; Greig 14', (yellow card) 40'; Cicerone (yellow card) 80'; Reynolds (yellow card) 90+6'; Dikwa (yellow card) 113' (yellow-red card) 114'	Stadium: Cownie Soccer Park; Attendance: 630; Referee: Esad Omanovic
	Penalties
	Coan (penalty missed); Volk (penalty scored); Perea (penalty missed); Bakayoko (penalty missed)		(penalty scored) Hilton; (penalty scored) Abend; (penalty scored) Cicerone

May 29 Third round	Saint Louis FC (Missouri)	3–1	(Wisconsin) Forward Madison FC	Fenton, Missouri
7:00 p.m. CDT	Gee 2'; Abend 6'; Umar (yellow card) 52'; Bahner (yellow card) 56'; Cicerone 72'	Report	Smart 38'; Michaud (yellow card) 82'	Stadium: Toyota Stadium; Attendance: 1,206; Referee: Ryan Cook

June 11 Fourth round	Saint Louis FC (Missouri)	2–1	(Illinois) Chicago Fire	St. Charles, Missouri
7:30 p.m. CDT	Martz 17'; Abend 21'; Kamdem (yellow card) 71'	Report	Kappelhof (yellow card) 19'; Nikolić 72' (pen.)	Stadium: Harlen C. Hunter Stadium; Attendance: 4,456; Referee: Greg Dopka

June 19 Round of 16	Saint Louis FC (Missouri)	1–0	(Ohio) FC Cincinnati	Fenton, Missouri
7:30PM CDT	Cicerone (yellow card) 70'; Fink 90+3'	Report	Hagglund (yellow card) 19'	Stadium: World Wide Technology Soccer Park; Attendance: 4,033; Referee: Michael Radchuk

July 10 Quarter-finals	Atlanta United FC (Georgia (U.S. state))	2–0	(Missouri) Saint Louis FC	Kennesaw, Georgia
6:00 p.m. CDT	Meram (yellow card) 45'; G. Martínez 52'; Robinson (yellow card) 61'; J. Martínez 90+5' (pen.)	Report	Umar (yellow card) 59'; Reynolds (yellow card) 90+4'	Stadium: Fifth Third Bank Stadium; Attendance: 7,523; Referee: Rosendo Mendoza
