= Black Gold Derby =

American soccer rivalry

- Other names: Oklahoma derby
- Location: Oklahoma
- Teams: OKC United; FC Tulsa
- First meeting: Tulsa 1–1 OKC (March 28, 2015)
- Latest meeting: Tulsa 2–0 (October 30, 2021)
- Next meeting: TBD
- Stadiums: TBD (Oklahoma City); ONEOK Field (Tulsa)

Statistics
- Total meetings: 24
- Most wins: OKC United(10)
- Top scorer: Joaquin Rivas (4)
- All-time series: OKC United: 10; Drawn: 8 FC Tulsa: 6
- Largest victory: OKC 3–0 Tulsa (July 23, 2016); Tulsa 0–3 OKC (August 8, 2018)

The Black Gold Derby is an American soccer rivalry between the two USL Championship (USLC) clubs based in Oklahoma: OKC United FC and FC Tulsa. The winner of the regular season series is awarded a four-foot wrench.

== History ==
The Oklahoma City Energy formed in late 2013, and FC Tulsa, previously known as "Tulsa Roughnecks FC", formed in mid-2014. Both clubs began their series ahead of the 2015 USL season.

The Energy's formation came through local businessman, Bob Funk, Jr., who pursued a bid for a club in the USLC (then known as the United Soccer League) in early 2013. Funk was awarded a franchise on July 2, 2013 with an intended launch date in 2014. Ahead of the 2014 season the Energy FC announced an affiliation agreement with Major League Soccer side, Sporting Kansas City. Former Kansas City goalkeeper, Jimmy Nielsen, was named head coach.

In March 2014, OKC Pro Soccer owner and founder of Oklahoma City's Fields & Futures program Tim McLaughlin joined the club as an ownership partner, bringing a secured lease to Taft Stadium, where Energy FC began play in 2015. The club's 2014 home schedule was played at Pribil Stadium on the campus of Bishop McGuinness Catholic High School.

The origins of FC Tulsa date back to 1978, when the original Tulsa Roughnecks formed. The original Roughnecks formed as a relocation of Team Hawaii ahead of the 1978 North American Soccer League season. The original Roughnecks won Soccer Bowl '83 against the Toronto Blizzard. The second iteration of the Roughnecks came in 1993, which joined the United States Interregional Soccer League (USISL), the body that evolved into the operator of today's USLC, the United Soccer League. The best season results for this version of the Roughnecks came in 1993 and 1994 where they reached the divisional finals in the playoffs. The club folded following the 1999–2000 USISL I-League season.

The series is temporarily on hold as OKC Energy FC has announced a hiatus during the 2022 USL Championship season, planning to return to play by 2027 when their new stadium is completed.

== Format ==
The trophy is awarded based on points earned for wins (3 points each) and draws (1 point each) during the USL Championship regular season and U.S. Open Cup fixtures, should the teams meet during the tournament. In case of a tie in both points and goal differential, the team with the higher number of away goals scored will be the winner. Finally, in case of a tie on points, goal differential, and away goals, the trophy will be given to the team with the highest final placement in the USLC rankings.

== Winners by year ==
Year	Winner	TUL Points	OKC Points	Tiebreaker
2022-27	Not contested	-	-	
2021	FC Tulsa	7	4	
2020	FC Tulsa	5	2	
2019	OKC Energy FC	2	2***	***USLC Rankings: OKC 28th - TUL 31st
2018	OKC Energy FC	1	7	
2017	Tulsa Roughnecks FC	6	3	
2016	OKC Energy FC	0	12	
2015	OKC Energy FC	5	8	

== Statistics ==
Competition	Played	OKC Wins	Draws	TUL Wins	OKC Goals	TUL Goals
USL/USL Championship	23	9	8	6	31	22
U.S. Open Cup	1	1	0	0	1	0
Total	23	10	8	6	31	22

== Results ==
Home team is listed on the left, away team is listed on the right. Home team's score is listed first.

Oklahoma City win Draw Tulsa win

March 28, 2015 USL	Tulsa Roughnecks	1–1	OKC Energy	Tulsa, OK
7:00 PM CDT	Ballew 71'	Report	Thomas 45+'	Stadium: ONEOK Field; Attendance: 8,335; Referee: Jon Freemon

May 27, 2015 USOC	Tulsa Roughnecks	0–1	OKC Energy	Tulsa, OK
7:00 PM CDT		Report	Tóth 82'	Stadium: ONEOK Field; Attendance: 2,584

June 13, 2015 USL	OKC Energy	2–0	Tulsa Roughnecks	Oklahoma City, OK
7:00 PM CDT	König 27'; Evans 49'	Report		Stadium: Taft Stadium; Attendance: 4,777; Referee: Greg Dopka

July 18, 2015 USL	OKC Energy	1–1	Tulsa Roughnecks	Oklahoma City, OK
7:00 PM CDT	König 60' (pen.)	Report	Ballew 50'	Stadium: Taft Stadium; Attendance: 4,541; Referee: Jeremy Kieso

September 6, 2015 USL	Tulsa Roughnecks	2–1	OKC Energy	Tulsa, OK
7:30 PM CDT	Ballew 63'; Nwabueze 79'		Tóth 86'	Stadium: ONEOK Field; Attendance: 6,005

June 4, 2016 USL	Tulsa Roughnecks	0–2	OKC Energy	Tulsa, OK
7:00 PM CDT		Report	Wojcik 21'; Gonzalez 28'	Stadium: ONEOK Field; Attendance: 4,913; Referee: Patrick Rosas

July 23, 2016 USL	OKC Energy	3–0	Tulsa Roughnecks	Oklahoma City, OK
7:30 PM CDT	Thomas 45' (pen.); Dalgaard 52'; Bonner 89'	Report		Stadium: Taft Stadium; Referee: Andrew Musashe

August 20, 2016 USL	Tulsa Roughnecks	0–2	OKC Energy	Tulsa, OK
7:30 PM CDT			Pitter 7'; König 65'	Stadium: ONEOK Field; Attendance: 4,170; Referee: Jon Freemon

August 27, 2016 USL	OKC Energy	1–0	Tulsa Roughnecks	Oklahoma City, OK
8:00 PM CDT	Wojcik 45+'	Report		Stadium: Taft Stadium; Attendance: 5,933; Referee: Travis Haight

July 8, 2017 USL	OKC Energy	1–2	Tulsa Roughnecks	Oklahoma City, OK
7:30 PM CDT	Gonzalez 39'	Report	Caffa 50' (pen.); Calistri 66'	Stadium: Taft Stadium; Attendance: 4,682; Referee: Guido Gonzales Jr.

August 12, 2017 USL	Tulsa Roughnecks	2–1	OKC Energy	Tulsa, OK
7:30 PM CDT	Rivas 20'; Svantesson 55'	Report	Angulo 47' (pen.)	Stadium: ONEOK Field; Attendance: 4,037; Referee: Ismir Pekmic

September 17, 2017 USL	OKC Energy	2–0	Tulsa Roughnecks	Oklahoma City, OK
5:00 PM CDT	González 5'; Barril 13'			Stadium: Taft Stadium; Attendance: 4,351; Referee: Lukas Szpala

March 17, 2018 USL	OKC Energy	1–0	Tulsa Roughnecks	Oklahoma City, OK
7:00 PM CDT	Atuahene 6'	Report		Stadium: Taft Stadium; Attendance: 6,757; Referee: Luis Guardia

May 26, 2018 USL	Tulsa Roughnecks	1–1	OKC Energy	Tulsa, OK
7:00 PM CDT	Rivas 16'	Report	Volesky 1'	Stadium: ONEOK Field; Attendance: 3,366; Referee: Elvis Osmanovic

August 8, 2018 USL	Tulsa Roughnecks	0–3	OKC Energy	Tulsa, OK
7:30 PM CDT		Report	Jahn 45'; Volesky 49'; A. Dixon 79' (pen.)	Stadium: ONEOK Field; Attendance: 2,805; Referee: Marcos de Oliveira

April 27, 2019 USLC	Tulsa Roughnecks	1–1	OKC Energy	Tulsa, OK
7:00 PM CDT	Silva 4'; Roberts (yellow card) 31'; Addai (yellow card) 41'; Hedrick (yellow card) 84'; Ajeakwa (yellow card) 90'	Report	Gordon 32'; García (yellow card) 79'	Stadium: ONEOK Field; Attendance: 3,620; Referee: Eric Tattersall

August 3, 2019 USLC	OKC Energy	1–1	Tulsa Roughnecks	Oklahoma City, OK
8:00 PM CDT	Eissele 17'; Watson (yellow card) 33' (yellow-red card) 63'; Eissele (yellow card) 74'	Report	da Costa 23'; Hedrick (yellow card) 33'; Rezende (yellow card) 38'	Stadium: Taft Stadium; Attendance: 5,013; Referee: Alejandro Aguilera Jr

July 13, 2020 USLC	OKC Energy	1–1	FC Tulsa	Oklahoma City, OK
6:00 PM CDT	Chávez 40'; Hyland (yellow card) 51'; Basuljevic (yellow card) 53'; Harris (yellow card) 87'	Report	da Costa 45+5'	Stadium: Taft Stadium; Attendance: Behind Closed Doors; Referee: Matthew Corrigan

September 12, 2020 USLC	FC Tulsa	1–1	OKC Energy	Tulsa, OK
7:00 CDT	Marlon (yellow card) 55'; Suárez 73'; Moloto (yellow card) 81'	Report	Chavez (yellow card) 35'; Hernández (yellow card) 71' (yellow-red card) 77'; Gordon 90'; Ibeagha (yellow card) 90+5'	Stadium: ONEOK Field; Attendance: 2,932; Referee: Lukasz Szpala

September 30, 2020 USLC	FC Tulsa	3–2	OKC Energy	Tulsa, OK
7:00 PM CDT	Marlon 15'; Chapman-Page (yellow card) 35'; Uzo 79', 88'; Altamirano (yellow card) 86'	Report	Cato 12'; Taravel (yellow card) 45+2'; Chávez (yellow card) 45+4'; Stephenson 57'; Amico (yellow card) 70'; Ellis-Hayden (yellow card) 84'	Stadium: ONEOK Field; Attendance: 2,320; Referee: Matthew Thompson

April 24, 2021 USLC	OKC Energy	1–3	FC Tulsa	Oklahoma City, OK
7pm CST	Donovan 76'	Report	Rivas 29', 36'; Suarez 87'	Stadium: Taft Stadium; Attendance: 3,380; Referee: Ismir Pekmic

July 2, 2021 USLC	OKC Energy	0–0	FC Tulsa	Oklahoma City, OK
7:30 PM CDT	Stephenson (yellow card) 90+2'	Report	Ayagwa (yellow card) 42'; Winters (yellow card) 74'	Stadium: Taft Stadium; Attendance: 2,673; Referee: Matthew Thompson

July 17, 2021 USLC	FC Tulsa	1–2	OKC Energy	Tulsa, OK
7:00 PM CDT	Corrales (yellow card) 14'; Suárez (yellow card) 25' da Costa (yellow card) 63', (goal) 90+1'	Report	Ward (yellow card) 39'; López 65'; Osmond (yellow card) 89'; Kurimoto 90+6'	Stadium: ONEOK Field; Attendance: 5,009; Referee: Brad Jensen

October 30, 2021 USLC	FC Tulsa	2–0	OKC Energy	Tulsa, OK
7pm CST	Rivas 11'; Marlon 82'	Report		Stadium: ONEOK Field; Attendance: 4,053; Referee: Michael Radchuk
