= Alex Dixon =

American professional soccer player

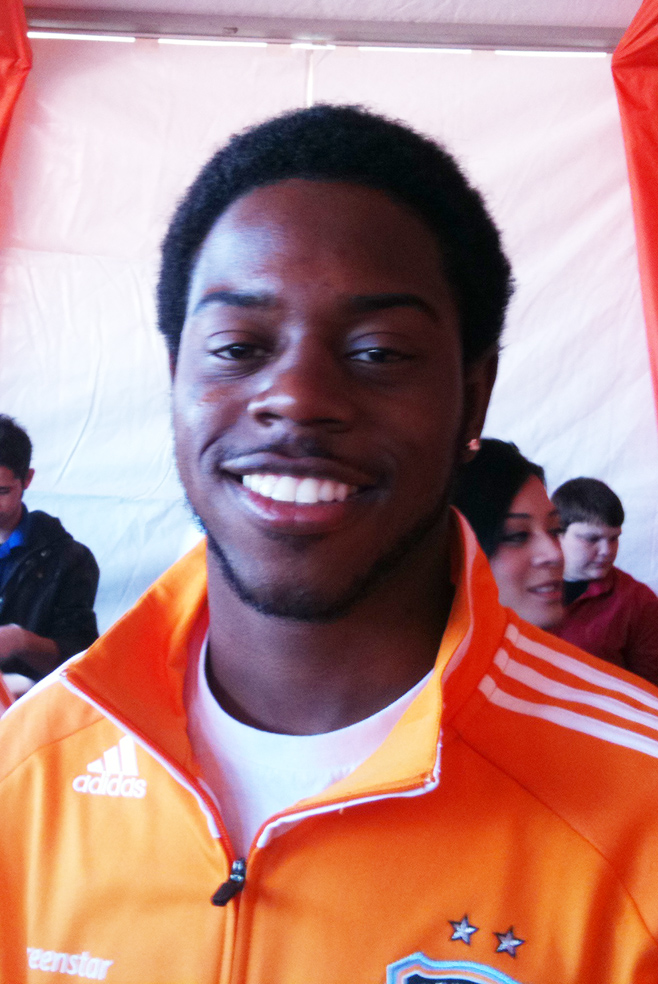

Personal information
- Full name: Hugh Alexander Dixon
- Date of birth: February 7, 1990 (age 36)
- Place of birth: Bay City, Texas, United States
- Height: 5 ft 8 in (1.73 m)
- Position: Winger

Youth career
- Texas Heat
- Houston Texans
- 2007–2008: Houston Dynamo

College career
Years	Team	Apps	(Gls)
2008–2010	North Carolina	61	(14)

Senior career*
Years	Team	Apps	(Gls)
2010	Reading United	7	(2)
2011–2013	Houston Dynamo	13	(1)
2013	→ Tampa Bay Rowdies (loan)	3	(1)
2014–2015	Rochester Rhinos	46	(6)
2016	Jacksonville Armada	15	(2)
2017–2018	Oklahoma City Energy	65	(18)
2019–2020	Hartford Athletic	42	(11)
2021–2022	Pittsburgh Riverhounds	64	(13)
2023–2025	Monterey Bay	63	(16)

International career^{‡}
2007	United States U17	3	(0)
- * Club domestic league appearances and goals as of October 29, 2025 ‡ National team caps and goals as of June 19, 2012

Hugh Alexander Dixon (born February 7, 1990) is an American professional soccer player who plays as a winger.

== College and amateur ==
The first youth club Dixon played for was the Texas Heat. He then joined the Houston Texans youth soccer club. He was a member of the United States U-17 residency program before returning to the Houston area and joining the Houston Dynamo academy. He also trained with the Dynamo first team for a bit during the 2008 season. Dixon then spent three years at UNC Chapel Hill where he appeared regularly for the Tar Heels. North Carolina qualified for the NCAA College Cup during all three of Dixon's season there.

Dixon also spent the 2010 season with Reading United in the USL Premier Development League.

== Club career ==
=== Houston Dynamo ===
Dixon was signed a Homegrown Player contract with the Houston Dynamo on January 19, 2011. Dixon was the fourth Homegrown Player in Dynamo history. He made his professional debut on April 2, 2011, coming on as a second-half substitute for Will Bruin in a 1–1 draw with New York Red Bulls. He scored his first goal with the Dynamo on August 20, 2011, with a goal in the 93rd minute to give Houston a 3–2 win over Real Salt Lake.

On September 20, 2012, Dixon made his CONCACAF Champions League debut win he came on as a substitute in a 4–0 win over C.D. FAS. However, Dixon only made 6 appearances across all competitions as he struggled to get game time.

On May 29, 2013, Dixon scored his first US Open Cup goal in a 2–0 win over FC Tucson. However he saw limited playing time and was loaned to the Tampa Bay Rowdies. On April 27, Dixon scored his first and only goal for Tampa Bay, against the Fort Lauderdale Strikers. Dixon saw limited game time in his three seasons in Houston and was waived after the 2013 season.

=== Rochester Rhinos ===
Dixon signed with Rochester Rhinos at the beginning of the 2014 season. He made his Rhinos debut on April 5 against Orlando City. Dixon scored his first goal for Rochester on May 2, 2014, in a 1–1 draw with the Richmond Kickers. On May 17, Dixon scored the winning goal in a 1–0 over the Pittsburgh Riverhounds. Dixon helped the Rhinos qualify for the 2014 USL Playoffs. In their first match, he got an assist, but the Rhinos lost 2–1 to LA Galaxy II.

Dixon got off to a hot start in the 2015 season, scoring 3 times in the first 6 games. The first came on April 4 as he scored the winning goal to give the Rhinos a 2–1 over Pittsburgh. The next goal for Dixon came on April 16 to rescue a draw against Louisville City. Then on April 26, Dixon scored another game winner, this time against New York Red Bulls II, to give Rochester a 2–0 win. Although Dixon failed to score the rest of the season for Rochester, he still made an impact in other ways, such as picking up 2 assists, drawing fouls in dangerous areas, and using his pace and positioning to create opportunities for the other forwards. Dixon helped Rochester win their first ever USL Regular Season title in club history, topping the table by 13 points. Dixon started all three of the Rhinos' playoffs games as they went on to win the playoffs as well.

=== Jacksonville Armada ===
On December 16, 2015, Dixon signed with Jacksonville Armada FC of the North American Soccer League ahead of the 2016 season. He made his Armada debut on April 10, 2016, in a 2–0 defeat to the New York Cosmos. On June 1, Jacksonville was tied in extra time until the 108th minute when Dixon backheeled a pass to Alhassane Keita who put it in the net to give the Armada a 2–1 win over the Charleston Battery in the US Open Cup. On July 9, Dixon scored one and assisted on another goal as Jacksonville beat Puerto Rico FC 2–1, giving Dixon his first goal with the Armada. Dixon scored his second goal for Jacksonville on October 19 as he helped the Armada defeat Miami FC 3–2.

=== Oklahoma City Energy ===
Dixon joined USL side Oklahoma City Energy on December 8, 2016. He made his OKC debut on March 25 in a 3–1 loss to Swope Park Rangers. In the Energy's next match, Dixon scored his first goal for OKC as they got a 1–1 draw with the Colorado Springs Switchbacks. On May 17 Dixon scored twice as the Energy defeated Moreno Valley FC 5–1 in their second round match in the US Open Cup. Dixon would score again in OKC's next match, this time in league play, on May 20 in a 1–0 win over Orange County SC. On August 5, Dixon scored a brace as the Energy won 2–0 against Real Monarchs, who were at the top of the league table. On October 8, Dixon had 2 assists to help give Oklahoma City a 4–1 over Swope Park. The victory also clinched the Energy's spot in the 2017 USL Playoffs. Dixon and the Energy reached the conference finals, but lost 7–6 on penalties. On the season, Dixon was 3rd in goals scored and minutes played for OKC.

Dixon re-signed with the Energy on December 13, 2017. The Energy and Dixon got off to a slow start in 2018, going 2-0-8 in their first 10 league games with Dixon failing to record a goal or assist during that span. Dixon picked up his first assist of the year on May 26 in a 1–1 draw with the Tulsa Roughnecks. He would score his first goal of the season on June 2 in a 2–1 defeat to Reno 1868. Dixon would find the back of the net again in OKC's next match, however they would once again lose 2–1, this time to Seattle Sounders 2. On July 4, Dixon got an assist to help the Energy to a 1–1 draw with San Antonio FC. He would stay hot in OKC's next match as he scored to help the Energy earn a 1–1 draw with Colorado Springs on July 7. In Oklahoma City's next match, Dixon would lead them to a win over Las Vegas Lights FC, scoring twice and assisting on another to help the Energy earn a 6–4 win. Dixon was named to the USL Team of the Week for his performance against Las Vegas. On August 8, Dixon scored as the Energy beat Tulsa 3–0, giving them the season series in the Black Gold Derby. He would score again in their next game to help OKC beat Real Monarchs 3–2. On August 18, Dixon found the back of the net for the third straight game and also added an assist as OKC defeated Rio Grande Valley 4–2. Dixon was once again named to the USL Team of the Week as a result of his good performances. He would end the season in good form, scoring in 3 of the last 6 matches. The Energy failed to qualify for the playoffs in 2018. However, Dixon enjoyed the most productive season of his career, his 34 appearances, 5 assists, and 11 goals were both career highs. His 11 goals were also the most on the team.

=== Hartford Athletic ===
On December 18, 2018, Dixon joined Hartford Athletic ahead of their inaugural 2019 season. Dixon made his Hartford debut on March 9, 2019, in a 2–0 loss to Atlanta United 2. He scored his first goal for Hartford on April 27, however they would lose 4–1 to North Carolina FC. Dixon got his first assist for Hartford on May 10 in a 1–2 loss to Memphis 901. He picked up his second goal for Hartford on July 17 in a 4–3 loss to Swope Park Rangers. On September 7, Dixon scored twice in a 5–1 win over Loudoun United and was subsequently named to the USLC Team of the Weak. He finished the season with 5 goals, tied for 3rd most on the team, and with 4 assists, tied for the most on the team. it was a poor league campaign for Hartford as a team, finishing 2nd to last in the Eastern Conference.

On October 30, 2019, Dixon signed a contract with Hartford for the 2020 season. The start of Hartford's 2020 season was delayed due to the COVID-19 pandemic Dixon and Hartford opened their season on July 17 with a 1–0 win over New York Red Bulls II. Dixon scored his first goal of the season on July 29 in a 4–1 loss to Indy Eleven. On August 2 he scored once to help Hartford defeat Red Bulls II 2–1. In Hartford's next match, Dixon scored in the 89th minute to earn a 2–2 draw with Loudoun United. On September 16, Dixon scored to help Hartford top Red Bulls II 3–0. He scored twice on September 20 as Hartford defeated Philadelphia Union II 3–0. His performance saw him named to the USL Championship Team of the Week. Dixon ended the regular season with 6 goals from 15 appearances, out of a possible 16, to help Hartford 2nd in the Eastern Conference and qualify for the playoffs. He would get the start in Hartford's first ever playoff game, but Saint Louis FC would win 1–0 on a goal in stoppage time. Following the season, Hartford fans voted Dixon the club's Offensive Player of the Year.

=== Pittsburgh Riverhounds ===
On January 8, 2021, Dixon signed a one-year contract with USL Championship side Pittsburgh Riverhounds.

=== Monterey Bay FC ===
On December 13, 2022, Monterey Bay FC announced the signing of Dixon to a two-year deal. During Monterey Bay's home opener against Hartford Athletic, Dixon scored a hat trick, contributing to the team's 5–3 victory over the visitors. This was the first hat trick of Dixon's career, and the first in Monterey Bay's club history. His first goal of the match was the fastest in the club's history at 91 seconds, his second was his 50th goal in USL Championship play, and the third goal was the club's first successfully converted penalty. The goal earned him USL Championship Player of the Week honors, yet another first for a player from the club. Dixon departed the club as a free agent following the 2025 season.

== Personal life ==
Dixon has three brothers and one sister. He graduated from Atascocita High School. Dixon grew up in Humble, Texas. He started to play soccer when he was 4. Dixon grew up an Arsenal fan. Dixon grew up admiring athletes such as Thierry Henry, Michael Jordan, and Allen Iverson.

== Career statistics ==
As of November 16, 2020

Club	Season	League			Playoffs		Cup		Continental		Total	
Club	Season	Division	Apps	Goals	Apps	Goals	Apps	Goals	Apps	Goals	Apps	Goals
Reading United	2010	PDL	7	2	0	0	0	0	—		7	2
Houston Dynamo	2011	MLS	7	1	0	0	1	0	—		8	1
Houston Dynamo	2012	MLS	4	0	0	0	1	0	1	0	6	0
Houston Dynamo	2013	MLS	2	0	0	0	2	1	1	0	5	1
Houston Dynamo	Total		13	1	0	0	4	1	2	0	19	2
Tampa Bay Rowdies (loan)	2013	NASL	3	1	—		0	0	—		3	1
Rochester Rhinos	2014	USL Pro	22	3	1	0	3	0	—		26	3
Rochester Rhinos	2015	USL	24	3	3	0	1	0	—		28	3
Rochester Rhinos	Total		46	6	4	0	4	0	0	0	54	6
Jacksonville Armada	2016	NASL	15	2	—		1	0	—		16	2
OKC Energy	2017	USL	31	7	2	0	3	2	—		36	9
OKC Energy	2018	USL	34	11	—		1	0	—		35	11
OKC Energy	Total		65	18	2	0	4	2	0	0	71	20
Hartford Athletic	2019	USL Championship	27	5	—		1	0	—		28	5
Hartford Athletic	2020	USL Championship	15	6	1	0	0	0	—		16	6
Hartford Athletic	Total		42	11	1	0	1	0	0	0	44	11
Career total			191	41	7	0	14	3	2	0	214	44

== Honors ==
Reading United

- USL PDL Mid Atlantic Division: 2010
- USL PDL Eastern Conference: 2010

Rochester Rhinos

- USL Playoffs: 2015
- USL Regular Season: 2015
