= David Spies =

German-American footballer

Personal information
- Date of birth: 5 September 1994 (age 32)
- Place of birth: Herdecke, Germany
- Height: 1.79 m (5 ft 10 in)
- Position: Forward

Youth career
- 2010–2013: VfL Bochum

Senior career*
Years	Team	Apps	(Gls)
2013–2015	1. FC Nürnberg II	37	(1)
2015–2016	FC Augsburg II	31	(6)
2016–2017	Charlotte Independence	23	(1)
2018–2019	ASC 09 Dortmund	6	(0)
Total		97	(8)
- * Club domestic league appearances and goals

David Spies (born 5 September 1994) is a German-American former professional footballer who played as a forward.

== Career ==
Spies began his career playing with the U-19 and reserve teams for VfL Bochum, 1. FC Nürnberg and FC Augsburg, before he signed with United Soccer League club Charlotte Independence on 2 September 2016.
