= Philip Rasmussen (footballer) =

Danish footballer (born 1989)

Personal information
- Date of birth: 12 January 1989 (age 37)
- Place of birth: Copenhagen, Denmark
- Height: 1.85 m (6 ft 1 in)
- Position: Midfielder

Youth career
- Lyngby

Senior career*
Years	Team	Apps	(Gls)
2008–2010	Nordsjælland	22	(0)
2010–2011	Viborg	11	(2)
2011–2013	Vestsjælland	20	(3)
2013–2016	Lyngby	101	(4)
2017–2018	Oklahoma City Energy	37	(4)
2019	Hartford Athletic	19	(2)
2020–2021	Roskilde	33	(1)

International career
2009	Denmark U21	1	(0)
- * Club domestic league appearances and goals as of 8 July 2021

Philip Rasmussen (born 12 January 1989) is a Danish professional footballer who plays as a midfielder.

== Career ==
=== Danish career ===
Rasmussen played in the Lyngby BK academy system untl 2008 when he signed with Nordsjaelland, appearing in 22 matches between 2008 and 2010. He appeared in four tournament matches for the team's eventual 2010 Danish Cup win. Between 2010 and 2013 Rasmussen played matches with FC Vestsjaelland and Viborg in either the Danish Superliga or Danish 1st Division.

==== Lyngby BK ====
Rasmussen joined Lyngby BK in 2013 and would go on to play four years with the team, appearing in 101 Danish Superliga matches. Between 2008 and 2017 he appeared in 154 matches logged nearly 10,000 minutes of play and scored nine goals.

=== USL ===
Rasmussen moved to Oklahoma City Energy FC of the USL Championship in 2017. He appeared in 14 matches with the team during the 2017 season. In 2018 he appeared in 25 games and tied his single season high in goals with three.

In 2019 Rasmussen signed with Hartford Athletic, joining former Head coach Jimmy Nelson who had recruited several former OKC Energy FC players and Danish soccer players to the new club, including Sebastian Dalgaard, Mads Jørgensen and Frederik Due. Both Rasmussen and Nelson would depart Hartford after the 2019 season.

=== FC Roskilde ===
On 26 February 2020 it was confirmed, that Rasmussen had joined Danish Superliga club FC Roskilde. He remained with the team after their relegation to Danish 1st Division for the 2020–2021 season. He left the club at the end of the 2020–21 season, when his contract expired.

== Honours ==
FC Nordsjælland

- Danish Cup: 2009–10
