= Callum Ross =

English footballer

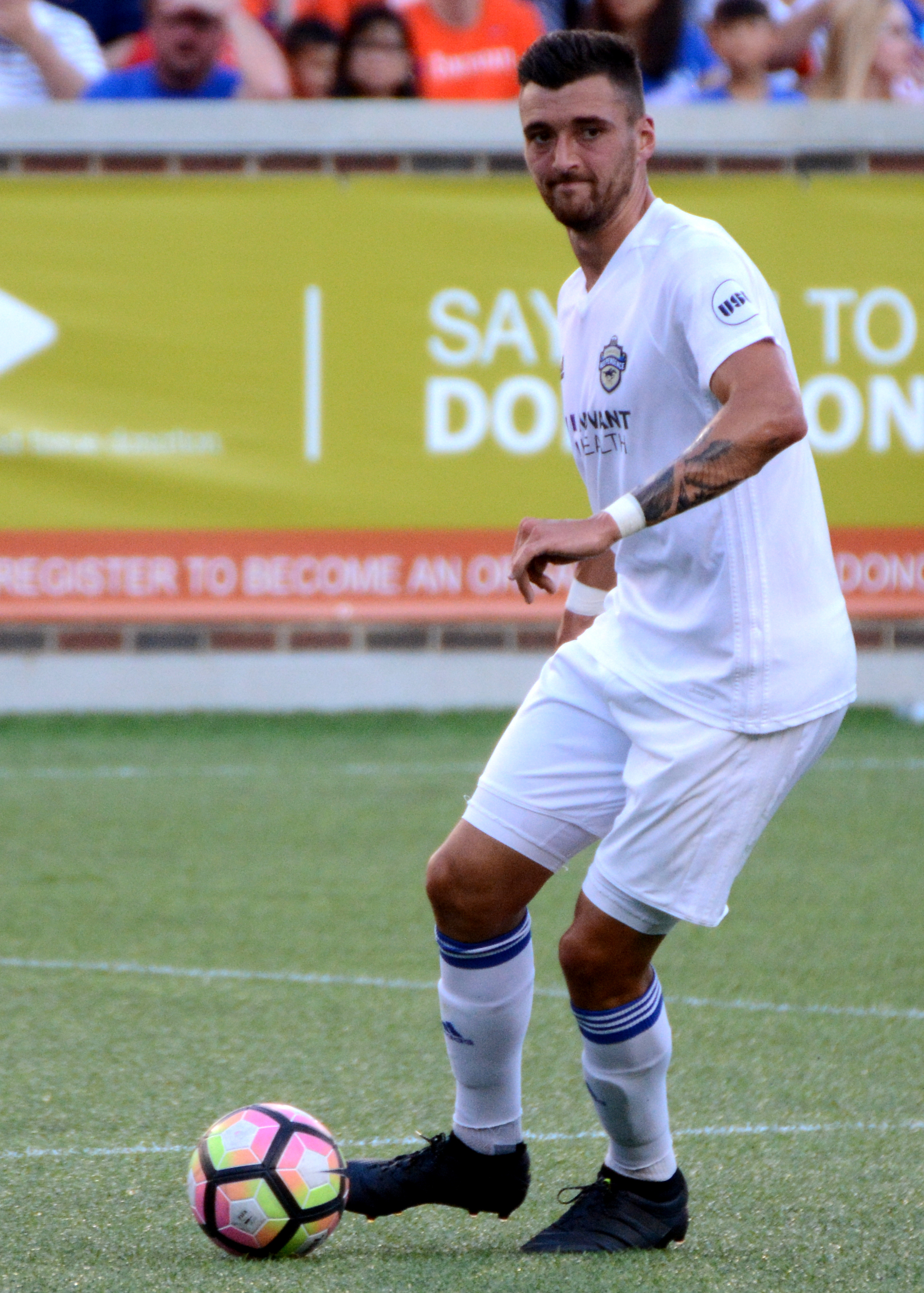
- Ross with Charlotte Independence in 2017

Personal information
- Date of birth: 15 September 1994 (age 32)
- Place of birth: Newcastle upon Tyne, England
- Height: 6 ft 2 in (1.88 m)
- Position: Midfielder

Team information
- Current team: Dunston UTS

Youth career
- –2004: Cramlington Juniors
- 2004–2007: Sunderland
- 2007–2010: Cramlington Juniors

College career
Years	Team	Apps	(Gls)
2013–2016	Wingate Bulldogs	58	(15)

Senior career*
Years	Team	Apps	(Gls)
2017	Charlotte Independence	30	(1)
2018–2019	Oklahoma City Energy	65	(2)
2020–2023	South Shields	47	(1)
2023–2025	Spennymoor Town	88	(3)
2025–2026	North Shields	12	(1)
2026–	Dunston UTS	0	(0)
- * Club domestic league appearances and goals as of 14:13, 5 June 2026 (UTC)

Callum Ross (born 15 September 1994) is an English semi-professional footballer who plays as a midfielder for Northern Premier League Division One East club Dunston UTS.

== Career ==
=== Early career ===
Ross started his football career with local side Cramlington Juniors. After a spell training with both Newcastle United and Sunderland, he signed for the latter, spending three years with the club before returning to Cramlington. He then attended St Thomas More Roman Catholic Academy before accepting an offer to study at Wingate University.

=== College ===
Ross played four years of college soccer at Wingate University between 2013 and 2016, although Ross missed the majority of the 2014 season due to injury. Ross helped guide Wingate University to its first ever division 2 national title in 2016.

=== Professional career ===
Ross signed with United Soccer League club Charlotte Independence 21 February 2017. He made his professional debut on 1 April 2017, starting in a 2–0 loss to Charleston Battery.

Ross signed with OKC Energy FC on 2 January 2018 for the 2018 season.

He returned to England and signed for South Shields in January 2020.

In January 2023, Ross joined National League North side Spennymoor Town for an undisclosed fee, signing an 18-month deal.

In June 2026, following a season with North Shields, Ross joined Northern Premier League Premier Division East club Dunston UTS.

== Honours ==
Spennymoor Town

- FA Trophy runner-up: 2024–25
