= Joaquín Rivas =

Salvadoran footballer (born 1992)

Personal information
- Full name: Joaquín Antonio Rivas Navarro
- Date of birth: 26 April 1992 (age 34)
- Place of birth: Santa Ana, El Salvador
- Height: 1.83 m (6 ft 0 in)
- Position: Forward

College career
Years	Team	Apps	(Gls)
2010–2013	UNLV Rebels		

Senior career*
Years	Team	Apps	(Gls)
2014	Kitsap Pumas	13	(6)
2015–2016	Sacramento Republic	19	(0)
2017–2018	Tulsa Roughnecks	61	(17)
2019–2020	Saint Louis FC	19	(2)
2021–2022	FC Tulsa	32	(8)
2022–2023	Miami FC	42	(14)
2024	El Paso Locomotive	24	(2)

International career
2018–2024	El Salvador	31	(4)
- * Club domestic league appearances and goals

Joaquín Antonio Rivas Navarro (born 26 April 1992) is a Salvadoran professional footballer who played for USL Championship club El Paso Locomotive and the El Salvador national team.

== Club career ==
=== Early career ===
Rivas played college soccer at the University of Nevada, Las Vegas from 2010 to 2013.

After college, Rivas appeared for USL PDL side Kitsap Pumas in 2014.

=== Professional ===
Rivas signed for United Soccer League side Tulsa Roughnecks, now known as FC Tulsa, as of the start of the 2017 season.

Rivas moved to USL side Saint Louis FC ahead of their 2019 season.

Following Saint Louis FC folding at the end of the 2020 season, Rivas returned to FC Tulsa.

In June 2022, Rivas moved to Miami FC. Tulsa received Sean McFarlane on loan in return.

Rivas joined USL Championship side El Paso Locomotive ahead of their 2024 season.

Rivas currently holds the goalscoring title in the Black Gold Derby, which pits Tulsa against in-state rival Oklahoma City Energy FC.

== International career ==
Rivas made his debut for the El Salvador national team on 16 November 2018 in a CONCACAF Nations League qualifier against Bermuda, as a half-time substitute for Jaime Alas.

=== International goals ===
Scores and results list El Salvador's goal tally first.

No.	Date	Venue	Opponent	Score	Result	Competition
1.	20 November 2018	Estadio Cuscatlán, San Salvador, El Salvador	Haiti	1–0	1–0	Friendly
2.	11 July 2021	Toyota Stadium, Frisco, United States	Guatemala	2–0	2–0	2021 CONCACAF Gold Cup
3.	24 July 2021	State Farm Stadium, Glendale, United States	Qatar	1–3	2–3	2021 CONCACAF Gold Cup
4.	24 July 2021	State Farm Stadium, Glendale, United States	Qatar	2–3	2–3	2021 CONCACAF Gold Cup
