= Joel Johnson (footballer) =

Liberian footballer

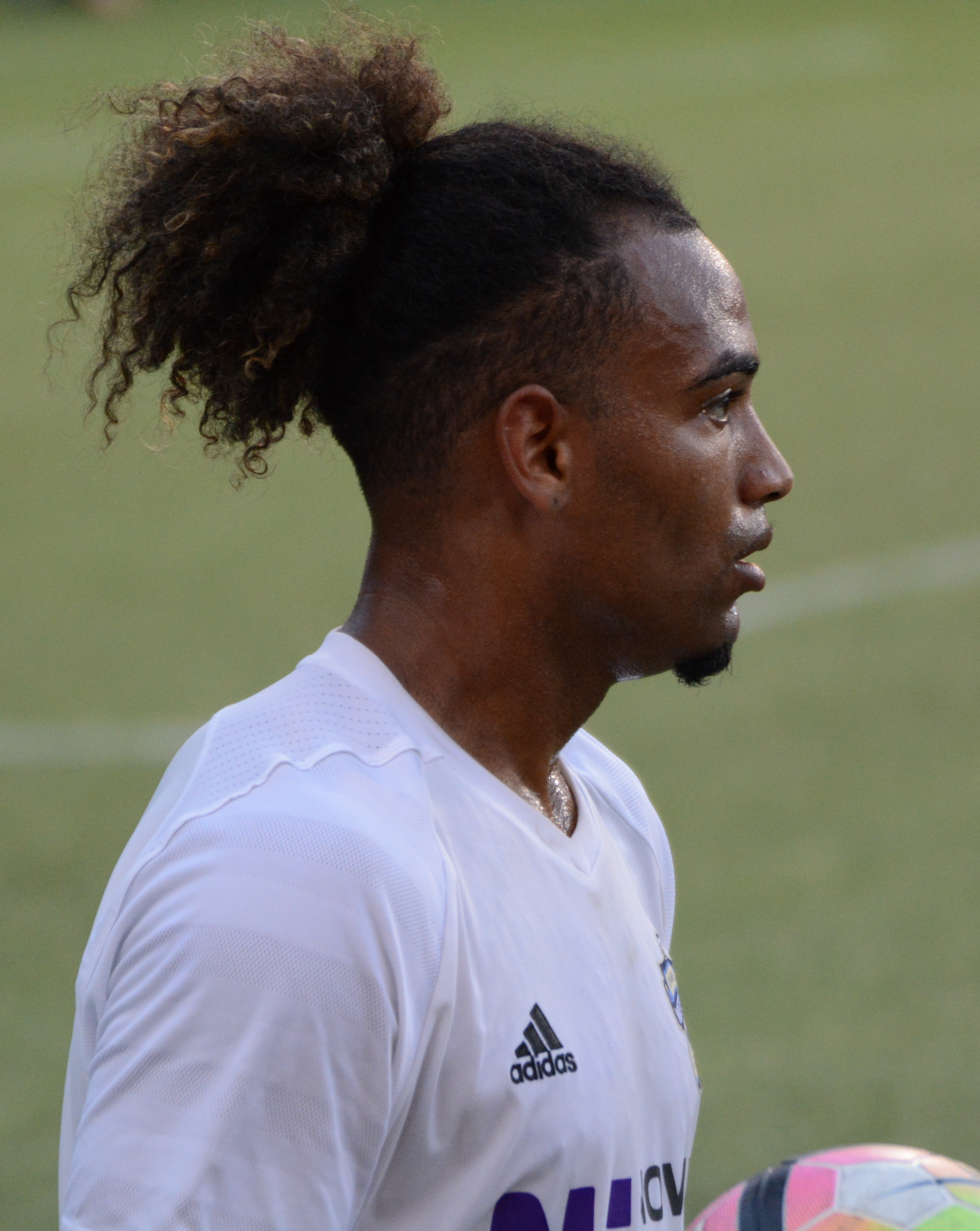
- Johnson with Charlotte Independence in 2017

Personal information
- Full name: Joel Johnson Alajarín
- Date of birth: 20 September 1992 (age 34)
- Place of birth: Torrent, Spain
- Height: 5 ft 11 in (1.80 m)
- Position: Right-back

Youth career
- 2000–2001: Torrent
- 2001–2009: Valencia

Senior career*
Years	Team	Apps	(Gls)
2009–2012	Valencia B	69	(1)
2010	Valencia	1	(0)
2012–2014	Real Madrid C	50	(0)
2014–2015	Jaén	16	(0)
2015–2016	Buñol	9	(0)
2016–2021	Charlotte Independence	146	(3)
2022	Hartford Athletic	34	(4)
2023–2024	Charlotte Independence	58	(10)
2025	Westchester SC	26	(0)

International career
2018–2023	Liberia	10	(0)
- * Club domestic league appearances and goals as of 13:17, 2 November 2025 (UTC)

Joel Johnson Alajarín (born 20 September 1992) is a professional footballer who plays as a right-back. Born in Spain, he represented the Liberia national team.

== Club career ==
Born in Torrent, Valencia, to a Liberian father and a Spanish mother, Johnson was a product of Valencia CF's youth system. He made his senior debut at only 17, appearing with the reserves in the Segunda División B and suffering relegation in 2010.

On 8 March 2010, as both right-backs in the first team, Bruno and Miguel, were unavailable, Johnson made his only La Liga appearance, playing the full 90 minutes in a 0–0 home draw against Racing de Santander. Released on 30 June 2012, he went on to compete solely in the lower leagues, first with Real Madrid C and then with Real Jaén, both in the third tier.

After a season with CD Buñol in the Tercera División, Johnson signed with USL Championship side Charlotte Independence on 6 April 2016. Six years later, he joined Hartford Athletic of the same country and league.

Johnson returned to the Independence in February 2023. With the club having moved down to USL League One to better serve its youth players, he scored a career-best seven goals in the first season in his second spell, adding four assists.

In January 2025, Johnson moved to new expansion third-tier side Westchester SC.

== International career ==
Johnson received his first call for the Liberia national team on 31 August 2016, being an unused substitute in the 4–1 away loss to Tunisia for the 2017 Africa Cup of Nations qualifying phase the following week. He only won his first cap on 9 September 2018, starting and playing 90 minutes in a 1–1 draw against DR Congo for the 2019 Africa Cup of Nations qualifiers.
