= Oscar Umar =

Ghanaian footballer (born 1993)

Personal information
- Full name: Abdul Umar
- Date of birth: 20 February 1993 (age 33)
- Place of birth: Tamale, Ghana
- Height: 5 ft 11 in (1.80 m)
- Position: Defensive midfielder

Youth career
- –2008: Right to Dream Academy

College career
Years	Team	Apps	(Gls)
2011–2014	Villanova Wildcats	74	(7)

Senior career*
Years	Team	Apps	(Gls)
2016	Ocean City Nor'easters	5	(0)
2017	West Chester United	5	(0)
2017–2018	Richmond Kickers	36	(1)
2019–2020	Saint Louis FC	34	(1)

Managerial career
- 2017–2018: Cabrini Cavaliers (assistant)
- 2020–2023: Washington University Bears (assistant)
- 2023–: Penn State Nittany Lions (assistant)
- * Club domestic league appearances and goals as of October 6, 2020

Abdul "Oscar" Umar is a Ghanaian retired footballer who is currently an assistant coach for the Penn State Nittany Lions men's soccer team.

== Career ==
Umar played four years of college soccer at Villanova University between 2011 and 2014. Following his time at Villanova, Umar coached soccer at Cabrini University and played with Premier Development League side Ocean City Nor'easters in 2016, and National Premier Soccer League side West Chester United in 2017.

Umar signed with United Soccer League side Richmond Kickers on 13 July 2017.

Umar moved to USL Championship side Saint Louis FC ahead of their 2019 season. Saint Louis FC folded following the 2020 USL Championship season.

In July 2023, Umar joined the Penn State Nittany Lions men's soccer staff as an assistant coach.
