= Jaime Siaj =

Association football player (born 1995)

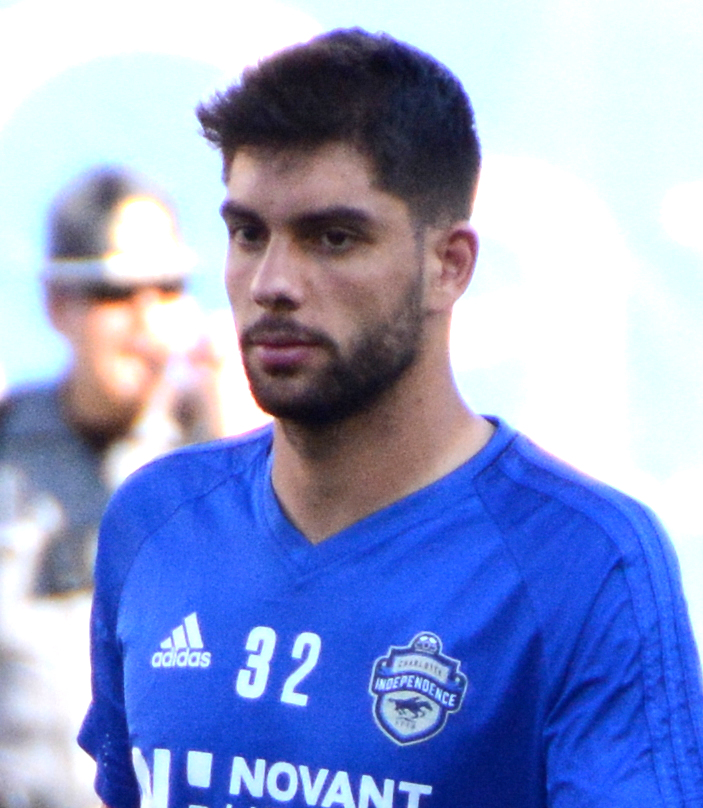
- Siaj with Charlotte Independence in 2017

Personal information
- Full name: Jaime Mohamad Fathi Ashor Siaj Romero
- Date of birth: 16 December 1995 (age 30)
- Place of birth: Madrid, Spain
- Height: 1.88 m (6 ft 2 in)
- Position: Forward

Team information
- Current team: Al-Wehdat

Youth career
- Escuela de Fútbol AFE
- 2011: ED Moratalaz
- 2012–2013: Real Madrid
- 2013–2014: Getafe

College career
Years	Team	Apps	(Gls)
2014–2016	Pfeiffer Falcons	69	(47)

Senior career*
Years	Team	Apps	(Gls)
2016	Charlotte Eagles	13	(4)
2017	Charlotte Independence	18	(4)
2018	Oklahoma City Energy	23	(4)
2019	Tampa Bay Rowdies	11	(2)
2020	Inter de Madrid	6	(1)
2020–2021	Khaitan		(17)
2021	Messina	7	(0)
2022	Ansar	0	(0)
2022	Finn Harps	9	(1)
2023	Valour FC	12	(0)
2024	Khaitan		
2024–2025	UE Santa Coloma	11	(3)
2025–2026	Al-Faisaly	13	(0)
2026–	Al-Wehdat	0	(0)

International career
2018	Jordan	5	(1)
- * Club domestic league appearances and goals as of 29 August 2026

Jaime Mohamad Fathi Ashor Siaj Romero (Arabic: محمد فتحي خايمي عاشور سياج روميرو; born 16 December 1995) is a professional footballer who plays as a forward for Al-Wehdat in the Jordanian Pro League. Born in Spain, Siaj represented Jordan internationally in 2018.

== Early life ==
Siaj began playing youth football with the Escuela de Fútbol AFE. He then played youth football with ED Moratalaz, where he played for half a season. From there, he moved on to the Real Madrid Academy, followed by the Getafe youth system.

== College career ==
In 2014, Siaj began attending Pfeiffer University in the United States, where he played for the men's soccer team. He scored his first goal in his debut on 5 September 2014 against the Millersville Marauders. He was named the Conference Carolinas Men's Soccer Player of the Week for the first time in Week 4 of his freshman season. At the end of his freshman season, he was named to the All-State Second Team and the All-Conference Second Team.

In his sophomore season, he was named the Conference Carolinas Men's Soccer Player of the Week twice, the National Player of the Week once, and was a selection for First Team All-Region, All-State First Team, and was an All-American Honorable Mention. He scored the overtime winning goal in the semi-finals to advance to the National Championship, where Pfeiffer won the NCAA Division II national title.

On 15 October 2016, he scored a hat trick in a 4–0 victory over the King Tornado. In his junior season, he was a two time Conference Carolinas Player of the Week, was named First Team All-Conference, Second Team All-America, First Team All-State, and First Team All-Region. He left the school after his junior season to turn professional, becoming the school's first ever player selected in the MLS SuperDraft. Siaj made a total of 69 appearances, scoring 47 goals and tallying 28 assists in his time at Pfeiffer.

== Club career ==
In 2016, he played with the Charlotte Eagles in the Premier Development League.

In January 2017, Siaj was selected in the third round (45th overall) of the 2017 MLS SuperDraft by Colorado Rapids. In April 2017, he signed with Colorado's USL affiliate, the Charlotte Independence.

In February 2018, Siaj signed with OKC Energy FC of the USL for the 2018 season.

In February 2019, Siaj joined the Tampa Bay Rowdies, a team he had previously trialled with during the 2017 preseason, playing in the pre-season 2017 Florida Cup tournament.

He then returned to Spain, joining Segunda División B side Inter de Madrid in 2020.

Later in 2020, he joined Kuwaiti club Khaitan SC.

In September 2021, he joined Italian Serie D side Messina. In December, he departed the club.

On 29 December 2021, Lebanese Premier League side Ansar announced the signing of Siaj.

On 2 September 2022, Siaj joined League of Ireland Premier Division club Finn Harps. The same day as his signing, he made his debut, as a substitute, against St Patrick's Athletic.

In January 2023, he joined Canadian Premier League club Valour FC.

In September 2024, he signed with UE Santa Coloma in the Andoran Primera Divisió.

On 5 July 2025, he joined Jordanian Pro League club Al-Faisaly.

== International career ==
Born in Spain, Siaj has Jordanian heritage through his father.

Siaj was called up to the Jordan national team for the first time on 11 May 2018, ahead of two friendly games against Cyprus and China. He made his debut on 20 May 2018, scoring his first goal in a 3–0 victory over Cyprus.

=== International goals ===
Scores and results list Jordan's goal tally first.

No	Date	Venue	Opponent	Score	Result	Competition
1	20 May 2018	Amman International Stadium, Amman, Jordan	Cyprus	2–0	3–0	Friendly
