= José Barril =

Spanish footballer

Personal information
- Full name: José María Barril Aguado
- Date of birth: 25 April 1992 (age 34)
- Place of birth: Madrid, Spain
- Height: 1.84 m (6 ft 0 in)
- Positions: Winger; attacking midfielder

Team information
- Current team: San Sebastián
- Number: 14

Youth career
- 1999–2011: Real Madrid

Senior career*
Years	Team	Apps	(Gls)
2011–2013	Real Madrid C	38	(7)
2013–2014	Ontinyent	1	(0)
2014–2016	Harrisburg City Islanders	77	(11)
2017–2018	Oklahoma City Energy	62	(3)
2019–2020	Coruxo	35	(0)
2020–	San Sebastián	14	(0)
- * Club domestic league appearances and goals as of 11 April 2021

José María Barril Aguado (born 25 April 1992) is a Spanish football player who plays for UD San Sebastián de los Reyes in the Segunda División B.

== Career ==
Barril played youth soccer with Real Madrid from seven years old and spent time with the club's 3rd team Real Madrid C between 2011 and 2013 despite having grown up in an Atlético de Madrid family.

After his release from Real Madrid, Barril spent two weeks with third-tier Spanish club Ontinyent CF, before signing with third-tier United States club Harrisburg City Islanders of the USL Pro.

After two seasons with Oklahoma City Energy, Barrill and Oklahoma mutually agreed to terminate his contract on 22 January 2019. He returned to Spain to sign for Segunda División B side Coruxo FC.
