= Sebastian Dalgaard =

Danish footballer (born 1991)

Personal information
- Full name: Sebastian Dalgaard Asmussen
- Date of birth: 23 August 1991 (age 35)
- Place of birth: Odense, Denmark
- Height: 1.88 m (6 ft 2 in)
- Positions: Midfielder; winger

Youth career
- OB
- B 1913
- –2009: FC Fyn

Senior career*
Years	Team	Apps	(Gls)
2009–2010	FC Fyn	0	(0)
2011–2013	BK Marienlyst	61	(18)
2013–2014	Brønshøj BK	53	(5)
2015–2016	Oklahoma City Energy	50	(8)
2017	Saint Louis FC	20	(1)
2018	Middelfart G&BK	32	(7)
2019	Hartford Athletic	27	(5)
2020–2023	Tampa Bay Rowdies	99	(6)
- * Club domestic league appearances and goals as of October 20, 2023

Sebastian Dalgaard Asmussen (born 23 August 1991) is a Danish professional footballer who plays as a winger. Dalgaard primarily plays on the left wing but can also excel up top as a striker.

== Career ==
Dalgaard was promoted and signed to the first-team squad of FC Fyn in an age of 18-years for the 2009–10 season, even making a few first team appearances as a U19 player. Earning the honors of getting picked for the Danish U-18 national team.

On July 1, 2010, Dalgaard left FC Fyn to sign for Denmark Series club BK Marienlyst, inking his second senior-level contract. He went on to make 61 appearances over two seasons with the club, scoring eight goals in 2010–11 and played a big role as Marienlyst won promotion to the Danish 2nd Division. Dalgaard enjoyed interest from multiple 1st Division and Superliga clubs after his time in Marienlyst BK.

Over the 2012–13 winter break, Dalgaard moved to Danish 1st Division club Brønshøj BK joining the legendary coach Bo Henriksen (currently FC Midtjylland). He became a regular in the club's starting lineup, and in January 2014 he extended his contract for a further 18 months.

Dalgaard left Denmark for the first time in his career on 15 December 2014, signing for countryman Jimmy Nielsen at United Soccer League club OKC Energy. Dalgaard played a big part of two successful seasons in Oklahoma City, making appearances in both the USL Western Conference Final in 2015 and the USL Western Conference Semi-Final in 2016.

On 15 November 2016, Dalgaard got offered a contract across the conference by fellow United Soccer League club Saint Louis FC.

After departing Saint Louis, Dalgaard returned to his native Denmark and signed for 2nd Division club Middelfart G&BK on 9 March 2018. After less than two months with the club, he extended his contract to the summer of 2019.

In January 2019, Dalgaard returned to the USL Championship and reunited with Jimmy Nielsen by signing with Hartford Athletic.

In February 2020, Dalgaard joined Tampa Bay Rowdies, also in the USL Championship. Playing a big role in two historic seasons to win the USL Eastern Conference and making it to the USL Championship Final which was cancelled due to COVID-19. Dalgaard was released by Tampa Bay following the 2023 season.
