= 2022 Houston Dynamo FC season =

Houston Dynamo
2022 season
- Owner: Ted Segal
- General manager: Pat Onstad
- Head coach: Paulo Nagamura (until September 5); Kenny Bundy (Interim) (from September 5)
- Stadium: PNC Stadium
- MLS: Conference: 13th Overall: 25th
- MLS Cup playoffs: DNQ
- U.S. Open Cup: Round of 32
- Top goalscorer: League: Sebastián Ferreira (13 goals); All: Sebastián Ferreira (14 goals)
- Highest home attendance: League/All: 21,284 (7/9 v. DAL) (7/13 v. MON (8/31 v. LAFC) (10/9 v. LAG)
- Lowest home attendance: All: 2,541 (5/11 v. SA, USOC); League: 10,305 (9/14 v. NE)
- Average home league attendance: 16,426
- Biggest win: LAG 0–3 HOU (5/22)
- Biggest defeat: PHI 6–0 HOU (7/30)
Home colors	Away colors

The 2022 Houston Dynamo season was the 17th season of the team's existence since joining Major League Soccer (MLS) prior to the 2006 season. It was the first season with head coach Paulo Nagamura, who was hired on January 3. 2022 was the Dynamo's first full season under General Manager Pat Onstad, who was hired with 1 game remaining in the 2021 season. Asher Mendelsohn was hired as technical director on January 3.

On January 18, the Dynamo made the most expensive signing in club history, signing Paraguayan striker Sebastián Ferreira from Club Libertad. On March 2, the Dynamo made the highest-profile transfer in club history, signing Mexican international Héctor Herrera from Atlético Madrid to a pre-contract agreement.

On September 5, with the team last in the Western Conference through 29 games and having just 2 wins in the last 13 games, Paulo Nagamura was fired as head coach. Dynamo 2 head coach Kenny Bundy was named interim head coach for the final 5 games, playing to a 2-2-1 record. The Dynamo ended the season 13th in the conference, missing the playoffs for the 5th consecutive season and the 8th time in 9 years.

On the front office end, it was Ted Segal's second season (first full season) as majority owner and John Walker's fourth and final season as President of Business Operations. On June 14, Walker announced he would step down following the season. On August 25, Ted Segal bought the remaining shares owned by Oscar De La Hoya, Gabriel Brener, and Ben Guill. Lyle Ayes also joined the ownership group

== Current squad ==
As of October 10, 2022

Appearances and goals are totals for MLS regular season only.

No.	Name	Nationality	Position	Date of birth (Age)	Signed from	Signed in	Apps.	Goals
Goalkeepers
12	Steve Clark	(United States)	GK	April 14, 1986 (age 36)	Portland Timbers	2022	33	0
26	Michael Nelson	(United States)	GK	February 10, 1995 (age 27)	Southern Methodist University	2018	13	0
38	Xavier Valdez (HGP)	(Dominican Republic)	GK	November 23, 2003 (age 18)	Houston Dynamo Academy	2022	0	0
Defenders
2	Daniel Steres	(United States)	DF	November 11, 1990 (age 31)	LA Galaxy	2022	18	2
3	Adam Lundqvist	(Sweden)	DF	March 20, 1994 (age 28)	IF Elfsborg	2018	121	0
4	Zarek Valentin	(Puerto Rico)	DF	August 6, 1991 (age 31)	Nashville SC	2020	53	0
5	Tim Parker	(United States)	DF	February 23, 1993 (age 29)	New York Red Bulls	2021	62	0
13	Ethan Bartlow (GA)	(United States)	DF	February 2, 2000 (age 22)	University of Washington	2021	15	0
17	Teenage Hadebe (DP)	(Zimbabwe)	DF	September 17, 1995 (age 27)	Yeni Malatyaspor	2021	39	2
25	Griffin Dorsey	(United States)	DF	March 5, 1999 (age 23)	Toronto FC	2021	47	3
29	Sam Junqua	(United States)	DF	November 9, 1996 (age 25)	University of California	2019	46	1
37	Zeca	(Brazil)	DF	May 16, 1994 (age 28)	Vasco da Gama	2022	20	0
Midfielders
8	Memo Rodríguez (HGP)	(United States)	MF	December 27, 1995 (age 26)	Rio Grande Valley FC	2017	136	17
16	Héctor Herrera (DP)	(Mexico)	MF	April 19, 1990 (age 32)	Atlético Madrid	2022	10	0
20	Adalberto Carrasquilla	(Panama)	MF	November 28, 1998 (age 23)	Cartagena	2021	42	3
22	Matías Vera	(Argentina)	MF	October 26, 1995 (age 26)	San Lorenzo	2019	108	3
24	Darwin Cerén	(El Salvador)	MF	December 31, 1989 (age 32)	San Jose Earthquakes	2018	109	3
27	Marcelo Palomino (HGP)	(United States)	MF	May 21, 2001 (age 21)	Houston Dynamo Academy	2020	3	0
32	Juan Castilla (HGP)	(Colombia)	MF	July 27, 2004 (age 18)	Houston Dynamo Academy	2021	2	0
35	Brooklyn Raines (HGP)	(United States)	MF	March 11, 2005 (age 17)	Barça Residency Academy	2022	1	0
Forwards
7	Thiago Fernandes (U22)	(Brazil)	FW	March 13, 2001 (age 21)	Flamengo	2022	3	0
9	Sebastián Ferreira (DP)	(Paraguay)	FW	February 13, 1998 (age 24)	Club Libertad	2022	31	13
10	Fafà Picault	(United States)	FW	February 23, 1991 (age 31)	FC Dallas	2021	61	18
11	Corey Baird	(United States)	FW	January 30, 1996 (age 26)	Los Angeles FC	2021	30	2
21	Nelson Quiñónes	(Colombia)	FW	August 20, 2002 (age 20)	Once Caldas	2022	8	0
23	Darwin Quintero	(Colombia)	FW	September 19, 1987 (age 35)	Minnesota United FC	2020	73	19
33	Danny Ríos (HGP)	(El Salvador)	FW	March 29, 2003 (age 19)	Houston Dynamo Academy	2021	0	0
34	Thorleifur Úlfarsson (GA)	(Iceland)	FW	December 27, 2000 (age 21)	Duke University	2022	31	4
45	Beto Avila	(United States)	FW	October 16, 2000 (age 21)	Houston Dynamo 2	2022	8	0

== Player movement ==
=== In ===
Per Major League Soccer and club policies terms of the deals do not get disclosed.

Date	Player	Position	Age	Previous club	Notes	Ref
December 12, 2021	(United States) Daniel Steres	DF	31	(United States) LA Galaxy	Acquired in exchange for a 3rd round pick in the 2022 MLS SuperDraft. The Galaxy will retain a portion of the salary budget charge in 2022.	
December 22, 2021	(United States) Steve Clark	GK	35	(United States) Portland Timbers	Signed on a free transfer.	
January 18, 2022	(Paraguay) Sebastián Ferreira	FW	23	(Paraguay) Club Libertad	Signed as a Designated Player. Transfer fee undisclosed, but is rumored to be $4.3 million.	
February 4, 2022	(United States) Brooklyn Raines	MF	16	(United States) Barça Residency Academy	Signed as a homegrown player. Acquired his homegrown rights from Real Salt Lake for $50,000 in GAM.	
February 10, 2022	(Brazil) Zeca	DF	27	(Brazil) Vasco da Gama	Signed on a free transfer.	
February 27, 2022	(Dominican Republic) Xavier Valdez	GK	18	(United States) Houston Dynamo Academy	Signed as a homegrown player. Acquired his homegrown territory rights from NYCFC and the New York Red Bulls for $50,000 in GAM each.	
March 2, 2022	(Mexico) Héctor Herrera	MF	31	(Spain) Atlético Madrid	Signed as a Designated Player on a free transfer, contract effective July 1, 2022	
March 21, 2022	(Brazil) Thiago Fernandes	FW	21	(Brazil) Flamengo	Signed on loan for the 2022 season with an option to buy. Signed as a U-22 Initiative player.	
May 6, 2022	(United States) Beto Avila	FW	21	(United States) Houston Dynamo 2	Promoted from reserve team.	
May 10, 2022	(Panama) Adalberto Carrasquilla	MF	23	(Spain) Cartagena	Exercised the purchase option on the loan. Transfer fee undiscloed but is reportedly close to $2 million.	
July 27, 2022	(Colombia) Nelson Quiñónes	FW	19	(Colombia) Once Caldas	Signed on a 12-month loan with an option to buy.	

=== Out ===
Date	Player	Position	Age	Destination Club	Notes	Ref
November 30, 2021	(Chile) José Bizama	DF	27	(Chile) Palestino	Contract option declined	
November 30, 2021	(Honduras) Maynor Figueroa	DF	38	retired	Contract option declined	
November 30, 2021	(Sweden) Erik McCue	DF	20	(Faroe Islands) AB Argir	Contract option declined	
November 30, 2021	(Croatia) Marko Marić	GK	25	(Greece) Atromitos	Contract option declined	
November 30, 2021	(United States) Kyle Morton	GK	27	(United States) Louisville City	Contract option declined	
November 30, 2021	(Argentina) Maximiliano Urruti	FW	30	(United States) Austin FC	Contract option declined	
November 30, 2021	(Venezuela) Alejandro Fuenmayor	DF	25	(United States) Oakland Roots	Contract expired	
November 30, 2021	(Honduras) Boniek García	MF	37	(Honduras) Olimpia	Contract expired	
December 16, 2021	(Costa Rica) Ariel Lassiter	FW	27	(United States) Inter Miami CF	Traded for $100,000 in GAM.	
February 21, 2022	(United States) Joe Corona	MF	31	(Sweden) GIF Sundsvall	Waived	
March 9, 2022	(United States) Derrick Jones	MF	25	(United States) Charlotte FC	Traded along with $50,000 in 2023 GAM for $250,000 in 2022 GAM.	
April 26, 2022	(United States) Nico Lemoine	FW	22		Waived	
August 5, 2022	(Canada) Tyler Pasher	FW	28	(United States) New York Red Bulls	Waived	

=== Loans out ===
Date	Player	Position	Age	Destination Club	Notes	Ref
January 28, 2022	(Argentina) Mateo Bajamich	FW	22	(Argentina) Huracán	Loaned for remainder of 2022 season.	
March 9, 2022	(United States) Nico Lemoine	FW	21	(United States) Oakland Roots	Loaned for remainder of 2022 season. Recalled on April 26.	
June 23, 2022	(United States) Ian Hoffmann	DF	20	(United States) Orange County SC	Loaned for remainder of 2022 season.	

=== MLS SuperDraft ===
Round	Pick	Player	Position	Age	College	Notes	Ref
1	4	Thorleifur Úlfarsson	FW	21	Duke	Signed to a Generation Adidas contract.	
2	32	Paulo Lima	MF	23	Providence	Signed with Houston Dynamo 2	
2	39	Arturo Ordoñez	DF	24	Pittsburgh	Signed with the Pittsburgh Riverhounds.	

== Coaching staff ==
As of September 6, 2022

Position	Name
Interim Head Coach	(United States) Kenny Bundy
Interim Assistant Coach	(England) Daniel Roberts
Interim Assistant Coach	(United States) Roy Lassiter
Goalkeeper Coach	(United States) Zach Thornton
Head of Performance	(Republic of Ireland) Paul Caffrey
Video Analyst	James Routledge
Scouting Coordinator/Analyst	Sebastian Romero
Head Athletic Trainer	Casey Carlson
Assistant Athletic Trainer	Steven Patera
Assistant Athletic Trainer	Joel Lockhart
Head Physical Therapist	Nathan Hironymous
Massage Therapist	Ivan Diaz
Head of Sports Science	Alex Calder
Strength & Conditioning Coach	Anthony Narcisi
Dietician	Brett Singer
Director of Team Administration	Cesar Martinez
Team Operations Coordinator	Alejandro Vega
Head Equipment Manager	Eddie Cerda
Assistant Equipment Manager	Shane Maxwell
Chief Medical Officer/Primary Care Physician	Dr. Rehal Bhojani
Head Orthopedic Surgeon	Dr. Walter Lowe
Team Orthopedic Physician	Dr. Evan Meeks

== Non-competitive ==
=== Preseason ===
January 29 Scrimmage	Houston Dynamo	–	Houston Dynamo 2	Houston, Texas
		Report		Stadium: Houston Sports Park

February 2 Desert Showcase	Houston Dynamo	1–1	Real Salt Lake	Tucson, Arizona
12:00 PM CST	Picault 20'	Report	55'	Stadium: Kino Sports Complex

February 5 Desert Showcase	Houston Dynamo	3–2	Colorado Rapids	Tucson, Arizona
5:00 PM CST	Ferreira 33'; Andre Gitau 82'; Carrasquilla 90+3'	Report	Rubio 7'; Toure 87'	Stadium: Kino Sports Complex

February 8 Desert Showcase	Houston Dynamo	2–1	Phoenix Rising	Tucson, Arizona
2:00 PM CST	Baird 2'; Ferreira 18'	Report	Lambert 24'	Stadium: Kino Sports Complex

February 12	Houston Dynamo	0–4	Austin FC	Houston, Texas
6:00 PM CST		Report	Domínguez 18', 20'; Ring 30'; Urruti 61'	Stadium: PNC Stadium

February 16	Houston Dynamo	2–1	Toronto FC	Austin, Texas
12:00 PM CST	Ferreira 5' (Dorsey); Pasher 61' (Úlfarsson)	HOU Report; TOR Report	Achara 74'	Stadium: St. David's Performance Center

February 19	FC Dallas	2–1	Houston Dynamo	Frisco, Texas
6:00 PM CST	Ferreira 4'; Pomykal 57'	Report	Baird 76'	Stadium: Toyota Stadium

== Competitions ==
=== Major League Soccer ===
==== Standings ====
===== Western Conference =====
Pos	Team	Pld	W	L	T	GF	GA	GD	Pts
10	Colorado Rapids	34	11	13	10	46	57	−11	43
11	Seattle Sounders FC	34	12	17	5	47	46	+1	41
12	Sporting Kansas City	34	11	16	7	42	54	−12	40
13	Houston Dynamo FC	34	10	18	6	43	56	−13	36
14	San Jose Earthquakes	34	8	15	11	52	69	−17	35

Source: MLS
Rules for classification: 1) points; 2) total wins; 3) total goal differential; 4) total goals scored; 5) fewer disciplinary points; 6) away goal differential; 7) away goals scored; 8) home goals differential; 9) home goals scored; 10) coin toss (2 clubs tied) or drawing of lots (≥3 clubs tied)

===== Overall =====
Pos	Team	Pld	W	L	T	GF	GA	GD	Pts
23	Atlanta United FC	34	10	14	10	48	54	−6	40
24	Chicago Fire FC	34	10	15	9	39	48	−9	39
25	Houston Dynamo FC	34	10	18	6	43	56	−13	36
26	San Jose Earthquakes	34	8	15	11	52	69	−17	35
27	Toronto FC (Note: Canadian clubs cannot qualify for the 2023 CONCACAF Champions League through the MLS regular season or playoffs.)	34	9	18	7	49	66	−17	34

Source: MLS
Rules for classification: 1) points; 2) total wins; 3) total goal differential; 4) total goals scored; 5) fewer disciplinary points; 6) away goal differential; 7) away goals scored; 8) home goals differential; 9) home goals scored; 10) coin toss (2 clubs tied) or drawing of lots (≥3 clubs tied)

==== Results summary ====
Overall								Home						Away					
Pld	W	D	L	GF	GA	GD	Pts	W	D	L	GF	GA	GD	W	D	L	GF	GA	GD
34	10	6	18	43	56	−13	36	6	5	6	24	22	+2	4	1	12	19	34	−15

==== Results by round ====
Round	1	2	3	4	5	6	7	8	9	10	11	12	13	14	15	16	17	18	19	20	21	22	23	24	25	26	27	28	29	30	31	32	33	34
Stadium	H	A	H	H	A	H	H	A	H	A	H	H	A	A	A	H	A	H	H	A	A	H	A	A	H	A	A	H	A	H	H	A	A	H
Result	D	L	W	D	W	W	D	L	L	L	W	L	W	L	L	W	L	L	D	L	W	L	L	L	L	D	L	W	L	D	W	L	W	L
Position (conf.)	9	11	9	8	7	6	5	7	7	8	6	8	7	7	10	8	9	11	11	11	11	11	11	12	12	13	14	12	14	13	13	13	13	13
Position (league)	18	19	18	16	12	7	7	10	13	18	13	15	13	13	19	15	16	20	20	21	19	21	22	25	25	26	27	25	27	26	26	26	25	25

Updated to match(es) played on October 10, 2022. Source: Match results
A = Away; H = Home; W = Win; D = Draw; L = Loss

==== Match results ====
February 27 1	Houston Dynamo	0–0	Real Salt Lake	Houston, Texas
6:00 PM CST	Steres (yellow card) 12'; Vera (yellow card) 34'; Carrasquilla (yellow card) 53'; Picault (yellow card) 90+4'	Report	Ruíz (yellow card) 17'; Caldwell (yellow card) 23'; Holt (yellow card) 59'	Stadium: PNC Stadium; Attendance: 18,561; Referee: Ramy Touchan

March 5 2	Sporting Kansas City	1–0	Houston Dynamo	Kansas City, Kansas
2:30 PM CST	Walter 60'; Espinoza (yellow card) 83'	Report	Cerén (yellow card) 55'; Quintero (yellow card) 86'; Vera (yellow card) 90+2'	Stadium: Children's Mercy Park; Attendance: 18,872; Referee: Victor Rivas

March 12 3	Houston Dynamo	2–1	Vancouver Whitecaps FC	Houston, Texas
5:30 PM CST	Quintero 33', 51'; Úlfarsson (yellow card) 87'	Report	Cavallini 14'; Brown (yellow card) 28'; Veselinović (yellow card) 80'	Stadium: PNC Stadium; Attendance: 13,028; Referee: Pierre-Luc Lauziere

March 19 4	Houston Dynamo	1–1	Colorado Rapids	Houston, Texas
7:30 PM CDT	Dorsey (yellow card) 68'; Rodríguez (yellow card) 78'; Pasher 90'	Report	Trusty (yellow card) 37'; Kaye 42'; Rosenberry (yellow card) 45+1'; Rubio (yellow card) 62'; Wilson (yellow card) 90+3'	Stadium: PNC Stadium; Attendance: 17,007; Referee: Nima Saghafi

April 2 5	Inter Miami CF	1–3	Houston Dynamo	Fort Lauderdale, Florida
7:00 PM CDT	Lassiter (yellow card) 38'; Marsman (yellow card) 57'; Gregore (yellow card) 61'; Higuaín 66' (pen.)	Report	Lundqvist (yellow card) 42'; Quintero 49'; Picault 57' (pen.), 90+3', (yellow card) 90+4'; Hadebe (yellow card) 78'; Baird (yellow card) 84'	Stadium: DRV PNK Stadium; Referee: Allen Chapman

April 9 6	Houston Dynamo	4–3	San Jose Earthquakes	Houston, Texas
7:30 PM CDT	Ferreira 8' (yellow card) 27' (goal) 68'; Quintero (yellow card) 18' (goal) 43'; Hadebe 57' (yellow card) 58'; Picault (yellow card) 63'; Cerén (yellow card) 89'; Bartlow (yellow card) 90+2'	Report	Marie (yellow card) 20'; López (yellow card) 22'; Ebobisse 25' 28'; Thompson 77'; Yueill (yellow card) 90+1'	Stadium: PNC Stadium; Attendance: 15,414; Referee: Ismir Pekmic

April 16 7	Houston Dynamo	0–0	Portland Timbers	Houston, Texas
5:00 PM CDT	Hadebe (yellow card) 26' (yellow-red card) 75'	Report	Paredes (yellow card) 16'; Blanco (yellow card) 26'; Chará (yellow card) 49'; Tuiloma (yellow card) 81'	Stadium: PNC Stadium; Attendance: 13,650; Referee: Rosendo Mendoza

April 23 8 Texas Derby	FC Dallas	2–1	Houston Dynamo	Frisco, Texas
2:00 PM CDT	Farfan (yellow card) 2'; Cerrillo (yellow card) 71'; Ntsabeleng 87'; Quignon 90+3' (yellow card) 90+5'	Report	Ferreira 33'; Dorsey (yellow card) 35'; Carrasquilla (yellow card) 78'; Bartlow (yellow card) 90+2'	Stadium: Toyota Stadium; Attendance: 15,792; Referee: Victor Rivas

April 30 9 Copa Tejas	Houston Dynamo	1–2	Austin FC	Houston, Texas
12:30 PM CDT	Ferreira 5'; Carrasquilla (yellow card) 47'; Hadebe (yellow card) 50'; Parker (yellow card) 88'	Report	Driussi (yellow card) 36', (goal) 66'; Pereira 39'; Ring (yellow card) 62'	Stadium: PNC Stadium; Attendance: 16,296; Referee: Ted Unkel

May 7 10	D.C. United	2–0	Houston Dynamo	Washington, D.C.
6:30 PM CDT	Fountas 35', 43'; Canouse (yellow card) 55'; Durkin (yellow card) 90+3'	Report	Quintero (yellow card) 45+4'; Carrasquilla (yellow card) 87'; Rodríguez (yellow card) 90+3'	Stadium: Audi Field; Attendance: 15,194; Referee: John Freemon

May 14 11	Houston Dynamo	2–0	Nashville SC	Houston, Texas
7:30 PM CDT	Carrasquilla 16'; Lundqvist (red card) 35'; Clark (yellow card) 42'; Hadebe (yellow card) 42'; Quintero (yellow card) 49' (goal) 53' (pen.)	Report	Miller (yellow card) 45+1'; Maher (yellow card) 46'; Zubak (yellow card) 86'; Zimmerman (yellow card) 90+1'	Stadium: PNC Stadium; Attendance: 16,035; Referee: Ramy Touchan

May 18 12	Houston Dynamo	0–1	Seattle Sounders FC	Houston, Texas
7:30 PM CDT	Carrasquilla (yellow card) 11' (yellow-red card) 54'	Report	Ruidíaz 28'; Rowe (yellow card) 47'; A. Roldan (yellow card) 79' (yellow-red card) 82'	Stadium: PNC Stadium; Attendance: 11,093; Referee: Rubiel Vazquez

May 22 13	LA Galaxy	0–3	Houston Dynamo	Carson, California
7:00 PM CDT	DePuy (yellow card) 65'	Report	Ferreira 11'; Rodríguez (yellow card) 16'; Pasher 58'; Úlfarsson 62', (yellow card) 62'; Avila (yellow card) 80'; Hadebe (yellow card) 86'	Stadium: Dignity Health Sports Park; Attendance: 22,471; Referee: Marcos de Oliveira

May 28 14	Real Salt Lake	3–0	Houston Dynamo	Sandy, Utah
8:30 PM CDT	Wood 29'; Córdova 57'; MacMath (yellow card) 79'; Glad 90+2'	Report	Avila (yellow card) 15'; Carrasquilla (yellow card) 25'	Stadium: Rio Tinto Stadium; Attendance: 20,489; Referee: Armando Villarreal

June 18 15	Orlando City SC	2–1	Houston Dynamo	Orlando, Florida
6:30 PM CDT	Jansson (yellow card) 14'; Kara 25', 58'; Pereyra (yellow card) 39'; Gallese (yellow card) 64'	Report	Avila (yellow card) 16'; Lundqvist (yellow card) 20'; Vera (yellow card) 21'; Zeca (yellow card) 32'; Hadebe (yellow card) 44'; Ferreira 59'; Úlfarsson (yellow card) 87'	Stadium: Exploria Stadium; Attendance: 16,333; Referee: Rosendo Mendoza

June 25 16	Houston Dynamo	2–0	Chicago Fire	Houston, Texas
7:00 PM CDT	Úlfarsson 23'; Rodríguez (yellow card) 41'; Quintero 45+2'; Steres (yellow card) 64'; Cerén (yellow card) 79'; Parker (yellow card) 90+2'	Report	Navarro (yellow card) 38'; Espinoza (yellow card) 81'	Stadium: PNC Stadium; Attendance: 13,081; Referee: Ismir Pekmic

June 29 17	Portland Timbers	2–1	Houston Dynamo	Portland, Oregon
9:30 PM CDT	Blanco (yellow card) 17'; Župarić (yellow card) 27'; Moreno 34' (pen.), 36', (yellow card) 42'; Tuiloma (yellow card) 54' (yellow-red card) 75'; Williamson (yellow card) 72'	Report	Rodríguez (yellow card) 21'; Zeca (yellow card) 34'; Hadebe (yellow card) 44'; Quintero 65'; Vera (yellow card) 69'	Stadium: Providence Park; Attendance: 22,932; Referee: Lukasz Szpala

July 3 18	Houston Dynamo	1–2	Charlotte FC	Houston, Texas
7:30 PM CDT	Cerén (yellow card) 55'; Steres (yellow card) 72'; Picault 81'	Report	Vera 28' (o.g.); Ruiz (yellow card) 66'; Shinyashiki 74', (yellow card) 85'; Gaines (yellow card) 90+1'	Stadium: PNC Stadium; Attendance: 19,242; Referee: Jair Marrufo

July 9 19 Texas Derby	Houston Dynamo	2–2	FC Dallas	Houston, Texas
7:30 PM CDT	Steres (yellow card) 41'; Lundqvist (yellow card) 47'; Úlfarsson 69'; Zeca (yellow card) 86'; Hadebe 90+11'	Report	Hedges (yellow card) 17', (goal) 27'; Quignón (yellow card) 22'; Ferreira (yellow card) 87', (goal) 90+3'; Farfan (yellow card) 88'; Servania (yellow card) 90+8' (yellow-red card) 90+13'	Stadium: PNC Stadium; Attendance: 21,284; Referee: Jon Freemon

July 12 20 Copa Tejas	Austin FC	3–1	Houston Dynamo	Austin, Texas
8:00 PM CDT	Fagúndez 15'; Urruti 57'; Lima (yellow card) 66'; Ring 70'	Report	Carrasquilla 11'; Hadebe (yellow card) 14'; Lundqvist (yellow card) 62'; Herrera (yellow card) 80'	Stadium: Q2 Stadium; Attendance: 20,738; Referee: Chris Penso

July 17 21	San Jose Earthquakes	1–2	Houston Dynamo	San Jose, California
8:30 PM CDT	Monteiro (yellow card) 45'; Yueill 53'	Report	Parker (yellow card) 28'; Vera (yellow card) 43'; Ferreira 71'; Úlfarsson 76'; Picault (yellow card) 90'	Stadium: PayPal Park; Attendance: 13,445; Referee: Tim Ford

July 23 22	Houston Dynamo	1–2	Minnesota United FC	Houston, Texas
7:30 PM CDT	Lundqvist (yellow card) 8'; Dorsey (yellow card) 59'; Picault 85'	Report	Fragapane 45+2'; Hlongwane 72'	Stadium: PNC Stadium; Attendance: 15,223; Referee: Nima Saghafi

July 30 23	Philadelphia Union	6–0	Houston Dynamo	Chester, Pennsylvania
6:30 PM CDT	Gazdag 23'; McGlynn 42'; Uhre 45+1', 48'; Carranza 55'; Flach (yellow card) 85'; Sullivan 89'	Report	Vera (yellow card) 63'; Cerén (yellow card) 83'; Dorsey (yellow card) 90'	Stadium: Subaru Park; Attendance: 19,089; Referee: Kevin Stott

August 5 24	Vancouver Whitecaps FC	2–1	Houston Dynamo	Vancouver, British Columbia
9:30 PM CDT	Cavallini (yellow card) 78' (goal) 90+2'; Gauld (yellow card) 81'; Becher 88'	Report	Picault; Herrera (yellow card) 53'	Stadium: BC Place; Attendance: 14,668; Referee: Fotis Bazakos

August 13 25	Houston Dynamo	2–3	CF Montréal	Houston, Texas
8:00 PM CDT	Ferreira 12'; Steres 36'; Micael (yellow card) 80'; Carrasquilla (yellow card) 86'	Report	Quioto 15' (pen.), (yellow card) 71'; Johnston 28', (yellow card) 66'; Corbo (yellow card) 63'; Lappalainen 69'	Stadium: PNC Stadium; Attendance: 21,284; Referee: Guido Gonzales Jr.

August 20 26	Colorado Rapids	1–1	Houston Dynamo	Commerce City, Colorado
8:00 PM CDT	Acosta (yellow card) 19' (yellow-red card) 80'; Abubakar 48'; Gutiérrez (yellow card) 65'; Barrios (yellow card) 85'	Report	Dorsey (yellow card) 15'; Herrera (yellow card) 67'; Ferreira 90+5'	Stadium: Dick's Sporting Goods Park; Attendance: 15,380; Referee: Marcos de Oliveira

August 27 27	Minnesota United FC	2–1	Houston Dynamo	Saint Paul, Minnesota
2:30 PM CDT	Reynoso (yellow card) 43'; Picault 79' (o.g.); Amarilla (yellow card) 84'	Report	Carrasquilla (yellow card) 37'; Baird 45+1'; Steres (yellow card) 63'; Parker (yellow card) 78'	Stadium: Allianz Field; Referee: Rosendo Mendoza

August 31 28	Houston Dynamo	2–1	Los Angeles FC	Houston, Texas
7:30 PM CDT	Ferreira 12' (pen.); Dorsey 75'; Cerén (yellow card) 90+3' (yellow-red card) 90+7'; Clark (yellow card) 90+6'	Report	Sánchez (yellow card) 11'; Arango 19'; Acosta (yellow card) 90+3'	Stadium: PNC Stadium; Attendance: 21,284; Referee: Matt Conger

September 4 29	Seattle Sounders FC	2–1	Houston Dynamo	Seattle, Washington
8:00 PM CDT	Nouhou 59'; Montero 76', (yellow card) 77'; Rusnák (yellow card) 85'	Report	Steres 26'; Dorsey (yellow card) 63'	Stadium: Lumen Field; Attendance: 33,621; Referee: Silviu Petrescu

September 10 30	Houston Dynamo	0–0	Sporting Kansas City	Houston, Texas
7:30 PM CDT	Vera (yellow card) 18' (yellow-red card) 41'; Ferreira (yellow card) 38'; Carrasquilla (yellow card) 90'	Report	Isimat-Mirin (yellow card) 65'; Sallói (yellow card) 88'	Stadium: PNC Stadium; Attendance: 15,169; Referee: Tori Penso

September 14 31	Houston Dynamo	3–1	New England Revolution	Houston, Texas
7:30 PM CDT	Quintero 37'; Picault (yellow card) 51', (goal) 76' (pen.), 85'; Cerén (yellow card) 67'	Report	Farrell (yellow card) 31'; Gil 63' (pen.); McNamara (yellow card) 74'	Stadium: PNC Stadium; Attendance: 10,305; Referee: Ismail Elfath

September 18 32	Los Angeles FC	3–1	Houston Dynamo	Los Angeles, California
9:30 PM CDT	Vela 8' (pen.), 45+4' (pen.); Hollingshead 52'	Report	Dorsey (yellow card) 7'; Baird 24'	Stadium: Banc of California Stadium; Attendance: 22,131; Referee: Kevin Stott

October 2 33	Nashville SC	1–2	Houston Dynamo	Nashville, Tennessee
7:30 PM CDT	Bunbury (yellow card) 90+3'; Zimmerman 90+6'	Report	Ferreira 29' (pen.), 39'; Hadebe (yellow card) 48' (yellow-red card) 90+4'	Stadium: Nashville Fairgrounds Stadium; Attendance: 28,720; Referee: Guido Gonzalez Jr

October 9 34	Houston Dynamo	1–3	LA Galaxy	Houston, Texas
4:00 PM CDT	Ferreira 8'; Parker (yellow card) 78'; Rodríguez (yellow card) 90+3'	Report	Hernández (yellow card) 17', (goal) 32'; Puig 31'; Araujo (yellow card) 61'; Joveljić 69'	Stadium: PNC Stadium; Attendance: 21,284; Referee: Drew Fischer

=== U.S. Open Cup ===
April 19 Third Round	Houston Dynamo (Texas)	2–1	(Texas) Rio Grande Valley FC Toros	Houston, Texas
7:30 PM CDT	Nodarse 9' (o.g.); Junqua 90+3'; Castilla (yellow card) 90+6'	Report	Hadebe 48' (o.g.)	Stadium: PNC Stadium; Attendance: 7,983; Referee: Elton García

May 11 Round of 32	Houston Dynamo (Texas)	1–0	(Texas) San Antonio FC	Houston, Texas
7:30 PM CDT	Picault (yellow card) 42'; Ferreira 82' (Junqua)	Report	Abu (yellow card) 40'; Garcia (yellow card) 42'; Taintor (yellow card) 76'	Stadium: PNC Stadium; Attendance: 2,541; Referee: Nima Saghafi

May 25 Round of 16	Sporting Kansas City	2–1	(Texas) Houston Dynamo	Kansas City, Kansas
7:30 PM CDT	Rosell (yellow card) 29'; Russell 52', 73' (pen.); Ford (yellow card) 88'	Report	Cerén (yellow card) 18'; Baird 41'; Quintero (yellow card) 51'; Dorsey (yellow card) 69'	Stadium: Children's Mercy Park; Attendance: 14,913; Referee: Calin Radosav

== Season statistics ==
=== Appearances, goals, assists, and cards ===
No.	Pos	Nat	Player	Total					MLS					Open Cup				
No.	Pos	Nat	Player	Apps	G	A	Booked	Sent off (straight red)	Apps	G	A	Booked	Sent off (straight red)	Apps	G	A	Booked	Sent off (straight red)
2	DF	(United States)	Daniel Steres	19	2	1	6	0	18	2	1	6	0	1	0	0	0	0
3	DF	(Sweden)	Adam Lundqvist	31	0	5	5	1	31	0	5	5	1	0	0	0	0	0
4	DF	(Puerto Rico)	Zarek Valentin	7	0	0	0	0	5	0	0	0	0	2	0	0	0	0
5	DF	(United States)	Tim Parker	29	0	0	5	0	28	0	0	5	0	1	0	0	0	0
7	FW	(Brazil)	Thiago Fernandes	5	0	0	0	0	3	0	0	0	0	2	0	0	0	0
8	MF	(United States)	Memo Rodríguez	33	0	3	6	0	30	0	3	6	0	3	0	0	0	0
9	FW	(Paraguay)	Sebastián Ferreira	32	14	3	2	0	31	13	3	2	0	1	1	0	0	0
10	MF	(United States)	Fafà Picault	32	7	3	6	0	30	7	3	5	0	2	0	0	1	0
11	FW	(United States)	Corey Baird	25	3	4	1	0	23	2	4	1	0	2	1	0	0	0
12	FW	(United States)	Steve Clark	33	0	0	2	0	33	0	0	2	0	0	0	0	0	0
13	DF	(United States)	Ethan Bartlow	17	0	0	2	0	15	0	0	2	0	2	0	0	0	0
16	MF	(Mexico)	Héctor Herrera	10	0	1	3	0	10	0	1	3	0	0	0	0	0	0
17	DF	(Zimbabwe)	Teenage Hadebe	23	2	0	10	2	22	2	0	10	2	1	0	0	0	0
17	FW	(United States)	Nico Lemoine (Note: Loaned out during the season) (Note: Transferred out during the season)	0	0	0	0	0	0	0	0	0	0	0	0	0	0	0
19	FW	(Canada)	Tyler Pasher	20	2	1	0	0	17	2	1	0	0	3	0	0	0	0
20	MF	(Panama)	Adalberto Carrasquilla	33	2	4	8	1	32	2	4	8	1	1	0	0	0	0
21	MF	(United States)	Derrick Jones	0	0	0	0	0	0	0	0	0	0	0	0	0	0	0
21	FW	(Colombia)	Nelson Quiñónes	8	0	0	0	0	8	0	0	0	0	0	0	0	0	0
22	MF	(Argentina)	Matías Vera	29	0	2	7	1	28	0	2	7	1	1	0	0	0	0
23	FW	(Colombia)	Darwin Quintero	32	8	6	5	0	31	8	5	4	0	1	0	1	0	0
24	MF	(El Salvador)	Darwin Cerén	30	0	1	9	1	27	0	1	8	1	3	0	0	1	0
25	MF	(United States)	Griffin Dorsey	29	1	3	8	0	27	1	3	7	0	2	0	0	1	0
26	GK	(United States)	Michael Nelson	5	0	0	0	0	2	0	0	0	0	3	0	0	0	0
27	MF	(United States)	Marcelo Palomino	4	0	0	0	0	2	0	0	0	0	2	0	0	0	0
29	DF	(United States)	Sam Junqua	18	1	2	0	0	15	0	1	0	0	3	1	1	0	0
30	MF	(United States)	Ian Hoffmann	0	0	0	0	0	0	0	0	0	0	0	0	0	0	0
32	MF	(Colombia)	Juan Castilla	2	0	0	2	0	1	0	0	1	0	1	0	0	1	0
33	FW	(El Salvador)	Danny Ríos	0	0	0	0	0	0	0	0	0	0	0	0	0	0	0
34	FW	(Iceland)	Thorleifur Úlfarsson	33	4	1	3	0	31	4	1	3	0	2	0	0	0	0
35	FW	(United States)	Brooklyn Raines	4	0	0	0	0	1	0	0	0	0	3	0	0	0	0
37	DF	(Brazil)	Zeca	21	0	1	3	0	20	0	1	3	0	1	0	0	0	0
38	GK	(Dominican Republic)	Xavier Valdez	0	0	0	0	0	0	0	0	0	0	0	0	0	0	0
45	FW	(United States)	Beto Avila	11	0	2	3	0	8	0	1	3	0	3	0	1	0	0
57	DF	(Brazil)	Micael (Note: Short term loan from Houston Dynamo 2)	1	0	0	1	1	0	0	1	0	0	0	0	0	0	0

Source: Player Stats and match reports in Competitions

=== Clean sheets ===
No.	Nat.	Player	MLS	Open Cup	Total
12	(United States)	Steve Clark	6	0	6
26	(United States)	Michael Nelson	0	1	1
Total			6	1	7

Source: Player Stats and match reports in Competitions

== Honors and awards ==
=== MLS Player of the Week ===
Week	Player	Opponent	Statistics	Ref.
13	(Paraguay) Sebastián Ferreira	LA Galaxy	1 goal and 2 assists	

=== MLS Goal of the Week ===
Week	Player	Opponent	Date	Ref.
9	(Paraguay) Sebastián Ferreira	Austin FC	April 30	

=== MLS Team of the Week ===
Week	Player	Position	Ref.
3	(Colombia) Darwin Quintero	MF	
5	(United States) Fafà Picault	FW	
6	(Paraguay) Sebastián Ferreira	FW	
11	(Panama) Adalberto Carrasquilla	Bench	
13	(Paraguay) Sebastián Ferreira	FW	
13	(United States) Steve Clark	Bench	
16	(Sweden) Adam Lundqvist	DF	
19	(Zimbabwe) Teenage Hadebe	DF	
21	(United States) Tim Parker	DF	
28	(United States) Steve Clark	GK	
28	(Panama) Adalberto Carrasquilla	MF	
28	(United States) Tim Parker	Bench	
28	(Brazil) Paulo Nagamura	Coach	
31	(United States) Fafà Picault	MF	
31	(United States) Corey Baird	Bench	
33	(Paraguay) Sebastián Ferreira	FW	
