= 2021 Houston Dynamo FC season =

Houston Dynamo
2021 season
- Owner: Gabriel Brener (until June 22); Ted Segal (from June 22)
- General manager: Matt Jordan (until August 30); Pat Onstad (from November 1)
- Head coach: Tab Ramos
- Stadium: PNC Stadium
- MLS: Conference: 13th Overall: 25th
- MLS Cup playoffs: DNQ
- U.S. Open Cup: Canceled
- Top goalscorer: League: Fafà Picault (11 goals); All: Fafà Picault (11 goals)
- Highest home attendance: 20,021 (7/3 v. CIN)
- Lowest home attendance: 6,376 (4/16 v. SJ)
- Average home league attendance: 12,220
- Biggest win: HOU 3–0 ATX (9/11)
- Biggest defeat: HOU 0–3 LAG (10/20)
Home colors	Away colors

The 2021 Houston Dynamo FC season was the 16th season of the team's existence since joining Major League Soccer (MLS) prior to the 2006 season. It was the team's second season under head coach Tab Ramos and seventh season under general manager Matt Jordan. On August 30, with the team on a 15-game winless streak, Jordan was fired. On November 1, with one game left in the season, Pat Onstad was hired as the new GM.

The Dynamo finished the season last in the Western Conference for the second consecutive season, failing to qualify for the playoffs for the 7th time in 8 seasons.

On the front office end, it was Gabriel Brener's sixth season as majority owner and John Walker's third season as President of Business Operations. On June 22, Ted Segal became majority owner after purchasing a controlling stake of the Dynamo and Dash for a reported $400 million. Former majority owner Brener kept a minority stake in the team, with James Harden, Oscar De La Hoya, and Ben Guill keeping their minority stakes. Minority owner Jake Silverstein sold his part of the team.

In October, BBVA Stadium was rebranded as PNC Stadium following PNC Financial Services' acquisition of BBVA USA.

== Final roster ==
As of November 4, 2021

Appearances and goals are totals for MLS regular season only.

No.	Name	Nationality	Position	Date of birth (Age)	Signed from	Signed in	Apps.	Goals
Goalkeepers
1	Marko Marić	(Croatia)	GK	January 3, 1996 (age 25)	TSG 1899 Hoffenheim	2020	45	0
26	Michael Nelson	(United States)	GK	February 10, 1995 (age 26)	Southern Methodist University	2018	11	0
31	Kyle Morton	(United States)	GK	March 31, 1994 (age 27)	Saint Louis FC	2021	1	0
Defenders
2	Alejandro Fuenmayor	(Venezuela)	DF	August 29, 1996 (age 25)	Carabobo FC	2018	38	3
3	Adam Lundkvist	(Sweden)	DF	March 20, 1994 (age 27)	IF Elfsborg	2018	90	0
4	Zarek Valenin	(Puerto Rico)	DF	August 6, 1991 (age 30)	Nashville SC	2020	48	0
5	Tim Parker	(United States)	DF	February 23, 1993 (age 28)	New York Red Bulls	2021	34	0
13	Ethan Bartlow (GA)	(United States)	DF	February 2, 2000 (age 21)	University of Washington	2021	0	0
15	Maynor Figueroa	(Honduras)	DF	May 2, 1983 (age 38)	FC Dallas	2019	58	2
18	Teenage Hadebe (DP)	(Zimbabwe)	DF	September 17, 1995 (age 26)	Yeni Malatyaspor	2021	17	0
29	Sam Junqua	(United States)	DF	November 9, 1996 (age 24)	University of California	2019	31	1
Midfielders
8	Memo Rodríguez (HGP)	(United States)	MF	December 27, 1995 (age 25)	Rio Grande Valley FC	2017	106	17
10	Fafà Picault	(United States)	MF	February 23, 1991 (age 30)	FC Dallas	2021	31	11
14	Joe Corona	(United States)	MF	July 9, 1990 (age 31)	LA Galaxy	2021	30	0
20	Adalberto Carrasquilla	(Panama)	MF	November 28, 1998 (age 22)	Cartagena	2021	10	1
21	Derrick Jones (HGP)	(United States)	MF	March 3, 1997 (age 24)	Nashville SC	2021	20	0
22	Matías Vera	(Argentina)	MF	October 26, 1995 (age 26)	San Lorenzo	2019	80	3
24	Darwin Cerén	(El Salvador)	MF	December 31, 1989 (age 31)	San Jose Earthquakes	2018	82	3
25	Griffin Dorsey	(United States)	MF	March 5, 1999 (age 22)	Toronto FC	2021	20	2
27	Boniek Garcia	(Honduras)	MF	September 4, 1984 (age 37)	Olimpia	2012	235	13
30	Ian Hoffmann	(United States)	MF	September 8, 2001 (age 20)	Rio Grande Valley FC	2021	6	0
32	Juan Castilla (HGP)	(Colombia)	MF	July 27, 2004 (age 17)	Houston Dynamo Academy	2021	2	0
Forwards
7	Mateo Bajamich	(Argentina)	FW	August 3, 1999 (age 22)	Instituto	2020	9	0
11	Ariel Lassiter	(Costa Rica)	FW	September 27, 1994 (age 27)	Alajuelense	2020	35	3
12	Corey Baird	(United States)	FW	January 30, 1996 (age 25)	Los Angeles FC	2021	7	0
17	Nico Lemoine	(United States)	FW	April 10, 2000 (age 21)	Rio Grande Valley FC	2020	12	0
19	Tyler Pasher	(Canada)	FW	April 27, 1994 (age 27)	Indy Eleven	2021	19	4
23	Darwin Quintero (DP)	(Colombia)	FW	September 19, 1987 (age 34)	Minnesota United FC	2020	42	10
33	Danny Ríos (HGP)	(El Salvador)	FW	March 29, 2003 (age 18)	Houston Dynamo Academy	2021	0	0
37	Maximiliano Urruti	(Argentina)	FW	February 22, 1991 (age 30)	CF Montréal	2021	30	7

== Player movement ==
=== In ===
Per Major League Soccer and club policies terms of the deals do not get disclosed.

Date	Player	Position	Age	Previous club	Notes	Ref
June 14, 2020	(Colombia) Juan Castilla	MF	15	(United States) Houston Dynamo Academy	Signed as a Homegrown Player, effective January 1, 2021	
July 10, 2020	(El Salvador) Danny Ríos	FW	17	(United States) Houston Dynamo Academy	Signed as a Homegrown Player, effective January 1, 2021	
July 27, 2020	(United States) Ian Hoffmann	MF	18	(United States) Rio Grande Valley FC	Signed a contract with Houston effective January 1, 2021. Spent the rest of 2020 with Houston's USLC affiliate RGVFC.	
December 1, 2020	(Costa Rica) Ariel Lassiter	FW	26	(Costa Rica) Alajuelense	Exercised the purchase option on loan agreement. Transfer fee undisclosed, but is rumored to be around $400,000.	
December 17, 2020	(United States) Fafà Picault	MF	29	(United States) FC Dallas	Acquired in exchange for $275,000 in general allocation money	
December 31, 2020	(United States) Joe Corona	MF	30	(United States) LA Galaxy	Free transfer, acquired his rights in stage 2 of the 2020 MLS Re-Entry Draft on December 22, 2020.	
January 14, 2021	(Canada) Tyler Pasher	FW	26	(United States) Indy Eleven	Full transfer. Transfer fee undisclosed, but reported to be around $50,000.	
January 18, 2021	(Argentina) Maximiliano Urruti	FW	29	(Canada) CF Montréal	Acquired along with Montréal's 2nd round pick in the 2022 MLS SuperDraft in exchange for Aljaž Struna and a 2021 international roster slot.	
January 19, 2021	(United States) Tim Parker	DF	27	(United States) New York Red Bulls	Acquired in exchange for $475,000 in general allocation money.	
January 21, 2021	(United States) Derrick Jones	MF	23	(United States) Nasvhille SC	Acquired in exchange for $250,000 in general allocation money.	
January 27, 2021	(United States) Kyle Morton	GK	26	(United States) Saint Louis FC	Signed on a free transfer.	
June 28, 2021	(Zimbabwe) Teenage Hadebe	DF	25	(Turkey) Yeni Malatyaspor	Signed as a Designated Player. Transfer fee undisclosed, but is rumored to be $1,650,000.	
July 5, 2021	(United States) Griffin Dorsey	MF	22	(Canada) Toronto FC	Signed on a free transfer	
July 30, 2021	(United States) Corey Baird	FW	25	(United States) Los Angeles FC	Acquired in exchange for $750,000 in general allocation money and a 2022 international roster slot.	

=== Out ===
Date	Player	Position	Age	Destination Club	Notes	Ref
December 1, 2020	(New Zealand) Kyle Adams	DF	24	(United States) Real Monarchs	Contract option declined	
December 1, 2020	(Argentina) Victor Cabrera	DF	27	(Argentina) Tigre	Contract option declined	
December 1, 2020	(United States) Cody Cropper	GK	27	(United States) FC Cincinnati	Contract option declined	
December 1, 2020	(Argentina) Tomás Martínez	MF	25	(Argentina) Defensa y Justicia	Contract option declined	
December 1, 2020	(Venezuela) Ronaldo Peña	FW	23	(Venezuela) Universidad Central	Contract option declined	
December 1, 2020	(Belize) Michael Salazar	FW	28	(United States) Memphis 901	Contract option declined	
December 1, 2020	(Central African Republic) Wilfried Zahibo	MF	27	(Republic of Ireland) Dundalk	Contract option declined	
December 1, 2020	(Denmark) Niko Hansen	MF	26	(United States) Minnesota United FC	Contract expired	
December 8, 2020	(Colombia) Mauro Manotas	FW	25	(Mexico) Tijuana	Full transfer, Fee undisclosed, rumored to be $4,000,000 with Houston keeping a sell-on percentage.	
January 18, 2021	(Slovenia) Aljaž Struna	DF	30	(Canada) CF Montréal	Traded to Montréal along with a 2021 International roster slot in exchange for Maximiliano Urruti and Montréal's 2nd round pick in the 2022 MLS SuperDraft.	
June 28, 2021	(United States) Christian Ramirez	FW	30	(Scotland) Aberdeen	Full Transfer. Fee undisclosed, rumored to be $250,000.	

=== Loans in ===
Date	Player	Position	Age	Previous club	Notes	Ref
August 5, 2021	(Panama) Adalberto Carrasquilla	MF	22	(Spain) Cartagena	Signed on loan for the remainder of 2021 with an option to buy.	

=== Loans out ===
Date	Player	Position	Age	Destination Club	Notes	Ref
November 9, 2020	(Argentina) Mateo Bajamich	FW	21	(Argentina) Instituto	Loaned until January 21, 2021	
February 24, 2021	(Sweden) Erik McCue	DF	20	(United States) Charleston Battery	Loaned for the 2021 season	
March 3, 2021	(United States) Marcelo Palomino	MF	19	(United States) Charlotte Independence	Loaned for the 2021 season	
July 9, 2021	(United States) Kyle Morton	GK	27	(United States) Memphis 901	Loaned for 2 months	
August 5, 2021	(Chile) José Bizama	DF	27	(United States) Charlotte Independence	Loaned for the 2021 season	

=== MLS SuperDraft ===
Round	Pick	Player	Position	Age	College	Notes	Ref
1	6	(United States) Ethan Bartlow	DF	20	Washington	Signed to a Generation Adidas contract.	
2	30	(United States) Kristo Strickler	FW	22	Virginia Tech	Signed with South Georgia Tormenta.	
3	57	(United States) Brandon Terwege	DF	22	SMU		

== Coaching staff ==
As of November 3, 2021

Position	Name
Head coach	(United States) Tab Ramos
Assistant coach	(United States) Omid Namazi
Assistant coach	(United States) Martín Vásquez
Coach	(United States) Michael Dellorusso
Goalkeeper coach	(England) Paul Rogers
Sports Performance Director/Fitness Coach	(Republic of Ireland) Paul Caffrey
Head of sports science	(Australia) Alex Calder
Equipment Manager	(United States) Chris Maxwell
Assistant Equipment Manager	(Mexico) Eddie Cerda
Chief Medical Officer	(United States) Dr. Rehal Bhojani
Head Athletic Trainer	(United States) Chris Rumsey
Assistant Athletic Trainer	(United States) Casey Carlson
Head Physical Therapist	(United States) Nathan Hironymous
Massage Therapist	(United States) Ivan Diaz

== Non-competitive ==
=== Preseason ===
March 20 Friendly	Houston Dynamo	2–0	Austin Bold	Houston, Texas
12:00 PM CDT	Ramirez 3rd period' Lassiter 3rd period'	Report		Stadium: Houston Sports Park
Note: Played in three 30-minute periods.

March 24 Friendly	Houston Dynamo	3–0	FC Tulsa	College Station, Texas
4:00 PM CDT	Urruti 15'; Pasher 34'; Vera 57'	HOU Report; TUL Report		Stadium: Ellis Field

March 28 Friendly	Houston Dynamo	2–0	Louisville City	Houston, Texas
1:00 PM CDT	Picault 5'; Urruti 27'	LOU Report		Stadium: Houston Sports Park
Note: Extra 25 minutes played after initial 90.

March 31 Friendly	Houston Dynamo	v	Austin Bold	Houston, Texas
1:00 PM CDT		Report		Stadium: BBVA Stadium
Note: Canceled due to a positive COVID-19 test.

April 3 La Copita	Austin FC	2–3	Houston Dynamo	Austin, Texas
3:00 PM CDT	Pochettino 16'; Redes 66'	HOU Report; ATX Report	Picault 54', 71'; Urruti 56'	Stadium: St. David's Performance Center

April 3 Scrimmage	Austin FC	0–1	Houston Dynamo	Austin, Texas
5:00 PM CDT		HOU Report	Rodríguez	Stadium: St. David's Performance Center
Note: 30-minute scrimmage.

April 6 La Copita	Houston Dynamo	2–0	OKC Energy	Houston, Texas
12:00 PM CDT	Rodríguez 11'; Bajamich 42'	Report		Stadium: Aveva Stadium

April 10 La Copita	Houston Dynamo	0–3	FC Dallas	Houston, Texas
4:00 PM CDT		Report	Jara 37'; Hollingshead 41'; Ferreira 83'	Stadium: BBVA Stadium

April 10 Scrimmage	Houston Dynamo	0–1	FC Dallas	Houston, Texas
6:00 PM CDT		Report	ElMedkhar	Stadium: BBVA Stadium
Note: 45-minute scrimmage.

== Competitions ==
=== Major League Soccer ===
==== Standings ====
===== Western Conference =====
Pos	Team	Pld	W	L	T	GF	GA	GD	Pts
9	Los Angeles FC	34	12	13	9	53	51	+2	45
10	San Jose Earthquakes	34	10	13	11	46	54	−8	41
11	FC Dallas	34	7	15	12	47	56	−9	33
12	Austin FC	34	9	21	4	35	56	−21	31
13	Houston Dynamo FC	34	6	16	12	36	54	−18	30

Source: MLS
Rules for classification: 1) points; 2) total wins; 3) total goal differential; 4) total goals scored; 5) fewer disciplinary points; 6) away goal differential; 7) away goals scored; 8) home goals differential; 9) home goals scored; 10) coin toss (2 clubs tied) or drawing of lots (≥3 clubs tied)

===== Overall =====
Pos	Team	Pld	W	L	T	GF	GA	GD	Pts
23	FC Dallas	34	7	15	12	47	56	−9	33
24	Austin FC	34	9	21	4	35	56	−21	31
25	Houston Dynamo FC	34	6	16	12	36	54	−18	30
26	Toronto FC	34	6	18	10	39	66	−27	28
27	FC Cincinnati	34	4	22	8	37	74	−37	20

Source: MLS
Rules for classification: 1) points; 2) total wins; 3) total goal differential; 4) total goals scored; 5) fewer disciplinary points; 6) away goal differential; 7) away goals scored; 8) home goals differential; 9) home goals scored; 10) coin toss (2 clubs tied) or drawing of lots (≥3 clubs tied)

==== Results summary ====
Overall								Home						Away					
Pld	W	D	L	GF	GA	GD	Pts	W	D	L	GF	GA	GD	W	D	L	GF	GA	GD
34	6	12	16	36	54	−18	30	6	6	5	21	22	−1	0	6	11	15	32	−17

==== Results by round ====
Round	1	2	3	4	5	6	7	8	9	10	11	12	13	14	15	16	17	18	19	20	21	22	23	24	25	26	27	28	29	30	31	32	33	34
Stadium	H	A	H	A	H	A	H	A	A	H	A	H	A	A	A	H	A	A	H	A	H	H	H	H	A	H	A	H	A	H	H	A	H	A
Result	W	L	D	D	W	L	W	L	D	D	D	D	L	D	D	D	L	L	L	L	D	L	L	W	D	W	L	D	L	W	L	L	L	L
Position (conf.)	5	9	8	11	4	6	4	5	7	6	6	7	8	9	9	9	11	11	11	12	13	13	13	12	12	12	12	12	12	11	11	11	12	13
Position (league)	7	14	14	19	5	13	7	11	13	13	12	16	17	18	18	18	20	21	22	24	25	25	25	24	24	23	23	24	24	22	23	23	24	25

Updated to match(es) played on November 4, 2021. Source: Match results
A = Away; H = Home; W = Win; D = Draw; L = Loss

==== Match results ====
April 16 1	Houston Dynamo	2–1	San Jose Earthquakes	Houston, Texas
7:00 PM CDT	Picault (yellow card) 29'; Rodríguez 39'; Vera (yellow card) 41'; Urruti 56'; Jones (yellow card) 90+4'	Report	López (yellow card) 51'; Remedi (yellow card) 52'; Marie 74'; Ríos (yellow card) 87'	Stadium: BBVA Stadium; Attendance: 6,376; Referee: Armando Villarreal

April 24 2	Portland Timbers	2–1	Houston Dynamo	Portland, Oregon
9:30 PM CDT	Asprilla 6' (yellow card) 26'; Bravo (yellow card) 39'; Paredes 73'	Report	Paredes 28' (o.g.); Valentin (yellow card) 36'; Urruti (yellow card) 37'	Stadium: Providence Park; Referee: Ismail Elfath

May 1 3	Houston Dynamo	1–1	Los Angeles FC	Houston, Texas
2:30 PM CDT	Pasher 57'	Report	Murillo (yellow card) 29'; Baird 55'	Stadium: BBVA Stadium; Attendance: 7,850; Referee: Robert Sibiga

May 8 4 Texas Derby	FC Dallas	1–1	Houston Dynamo	Frisco, Texas
2:30 PM CDT	Bressan (yellow card) 34'; Obrian 42' (yellow card) 54'; Acosta (yellow card) 82'	Report	Picault 34' (pen.); Rodríguez (yellow card) 44'; Vera (yellow card) 44'; Corona (yellow card) 46'	Stadium: Toyota Stadium; Attendance: 8749; Referee: Alex Chilowicz

May 12 5	Houston Dynamo	1–0	Sporting Kansas City	Houston, Texas
7:30 PM CDT	Urruti 56'; Picault (yellow card) 90+6'	Report	Espinoza (yellow card) 70'	Stadium: BBVA Stadium; Attendance: 7,054; Referee: Chris Penso

May 15 6	Colorado Rapids	3–1	Houston Dynamo	Commerce City, Colorado
8:00 PM CDT	Vines 29'; Rubio 36'; Bassett 42'; Mezquida (yellow card) 85'	Report	Ramirez 39'; Corona (yellow card) 67'; Figueroa (yellow card) 86'	Stadium: Dick's Sporting Goods Park; Referee: Victor Rivas

May 22 7	Houston Dynamo	2–1	Vancouver Whitecaps FC	Houston, Texas
8:00 PM CDT	Rodríguez 8'; Jones (yellow card) 22'; Corona (yellow card) 32'; Urruti 42'; García (yellow card) 82'; Picault (yellow card) 88'	Report	Cavallini (yellow card) 21'; Bikel (yellow card) 52'; Caicedo 80'; Baldisimo (yellow card) 81'	Stadium: BBVA Stadium; Attendance: 9,255; Referee: Dave Gantar

May 29 8	Sporting Kansas City	3–2	Houston Dynamo	Kansas City, Kansas
7:30 PM CDT	Busio 51'; Pulido 61' (pen.); Kinda 65'; Zusi (yellow card) 90+1'	Report	Jones (yellow card) 4'; Vera 13' (yellow card) 42'; García (yellow card) 82'; Urruti 90+3'	Stadium: Children's Mercy Park; Attendance: 20,086; Referee: Drew Fischer

June 19 9	Los Angeles FC	1–1	Houston Dynamo	Los Angeles, California
10:00 PM CDT	Cifuentes 50'	Report	Parker (yellow card) 17'; Vera (yellow card) 30'; Urruti 58'; Picault (yellow card) 71'	Stadium: Banc of California Stadium; Attendance: 22,043; Referee: Joseph Dickerson

June 23 10	Houston Dynamo	2–2	Portland Timbers	Houston, Texas
7:30 PM CDT	Picault 15' (yellow card) 59'; Pasher 33'	Report	Bonilla (yellow card) 38'; Asprilla 50'; Mabiala (yellow card) 72'; Blanco (yellow card) 73'; Ebobisse 90+1'	Stadium: BBVA Stadium; Attendance: 10,791; Referee: Armando Villarreal

June 26 11	Real Salt Lake	1–1	Houston Dynamo	Sandy, Utah
7:00 PM CDT	Glad 11'	Report	Vera (yellow card) 42'; Urruti 52' (yellow card) 66'; Cerén (yellow card) 84'	Stadium: Rio Tinto Stadium; Attendance: 13,588; Referee: Nima Saghafi

July 3 12	Houston Dynamo	1–1	FC Cincinnati	Houston, Texas
7:30 PM CDT	Pasher 3'; Figueroa (yellow card) 48'; Valentin (yellow card) 70'; García (yellow card) 81'	Report	Barreal 5'; Kubo (yellow card) 55'	Stadium: BBVA Stadium; Attendance: 20,021; Referee: Marcos de Oliviera

July 7 13	Seattle Sounders FC	2–0	Houston Dynamo	Seattle, Washington
8:00 PM CDT	Andrade (yellow card) 33'; Leyva (yellow card) 51'; Rowe 62'; Ruidíaz 90+4'	Report	Picault (yellow card) 80'	Stadium: Lumen Field; Attendance: 27,421; Referee: Robert Sibiga

July 21 14	Vancouver Whitecaps FC	0–0	Houston Dynamo	Salt Lake City, Utah
9:00 PM CDT	Rose (yellow card) 24'; Alexandre (yellow card) 83'	Report	Hadebe (yellow card) 42'; Junqua (yellow card) 56'; Picault (yellow card) 83'	Stadium: Rio Tinto Stadium; Attendance: 0 Referee: Guido Gonzales Jr.

July 24 15	San Jose Earthquakes	1–1	Houston Dynamo	San Jose, California
9:00 PM CDT	Valentin 45+5' (o.g.); Cardoso (yellow card) 70'; Fierro (red card) 90+7'	Report	Vera 40', (yellow card) 68'; Picault (yellow card) 53'; Parker (yellow card) 57'; Urruti (yellow card) 90+8'	Stadium: PayPal Park; Attendance: 12,793; Referee: Ted Unkel

July 31 16	Houston Dynamo	0–0	Real Salt Lake	Houston, Texas
7:30 PM CDT		Report	Glad (yellow card) 40' (yellow-red card) 87'; Holt (yellow card) 90+2'	Stadium: BBVA Stadium; Attendance: 13,462; Referee: Guido Gonzalez Jr.

August 4 17 Copa Tejas	Austin FC	3–2	Houston Dynamo	Austin, Texas
8:00 PM CDT	Pochettino 7', 45+1'; Domínguez 56'; Stroud (yellow card) 83'	Report	Cerén (red card) 70'; Pasher 27'; Dorsey (yellow card) 79'; Picault (yellow card) 86'	Stadium: Q2 Stadium; Attendance: 20,738; Referee: Joseph Dickerson

August 7 18	Minnesota United FC	2–0	Houston Dynamo	Saint Paul, Minnesota
7:00 PM CDT	Lod 14'; Kallman 71'	Report	Rodríguez (yellow card) 21'; Junqua (yellow card) 21'; Jones (yellow card) 62'	Stadium: Allianz Field; Attendance: 19,625; Referee: Silviu Petrescu

August 14 19	Houston Dynamo	1–3	Colorado Rapids	Houston, Texas
7:30 PM CDT	Picault 45+6' (pen.)	Report	Abubakar 5'; Rubio (yellow card) 24'; Barrios 60'; Galván 80'	Stadium: BBVA Stadium; Attendance: 13,908; Referee: Rosendo Mendoza

August 18 20	Real Salt Lake	2–1	Houston Dynamo	Sandy, Utah
9:00 PM CDT	Meram 6'; Kreilach (yellow card) 29'; Julio 88'; Rusnák (yellow card) 90'	Report	Picault 51'	Stadium: Rio Tinto Stadium; Attendance: 13,570; Referee: Jair Marrufo

August 21 21 Texas Derby	Houston Dynamo	2–2	FC Dallas	Houston, Texas
7:30 PM CDT	Picault 25' (pen.); Vera 72'; Urruti (yellow card) 82'; Cerén (yellow card) 90+1'	Report	Cerrillo (yellow card) 15'; Schön (yellow card) 30'; Burgess 54'; Pepi 58'; Acosta (yellow card) 65'; Hedges (yellow card) 83'	Stadium: BBVA Stadium; Attendance: 13,548; Referee: Allen Chapman

August 28 22	Houston Dynamo	1–2	Minnesota United FC	Houston, Texas
8:00 PM CDT	Carrasquilla 1'; Dorsey (yellow card) 61'; Hadebe (yellow card) 73'; Valentin (yellow card) 77'	Report	Hunou 16', 73'	Stadium: BBVA Stadium; Attendance: 14,521; Referee: Ted Unkel

September 3 22	Houston Dynamo	0–2	Portland Timbers	Houston, Texas
17:00 PST	Parker (yellow card) 50'	Report	Y. Chará 15'; Mora 20' (pen.); Bravo (yellow card) 51'; Zambrano (yellow card) 86'; Mabiala (yellow card) 90+2'	Stadium: BBVA Stadium; Attendance: 9,872; Referee: Rubiel Vazquez

September 11 24 Copa Tejas	Houston Dynamo	3–0	Austin FC	Houston, Texas
7:30 PM CDT	Dorsey 1'; Picault 24', 64', (yellow card) 39'; Lundqvist (yellow card) 52'	Report	Pochettino (yellow card) 22'; Ring (yellow card) 44'; Berhalter (yellow card) 51'	Stadium: BBVA Stadium; Attendance: 14,070; Referee: Ismail Elfath

September 15 25	LA Galaxy	1–1	Houston Dynamo	Carson, California
9:30 PM CDT	Hernandez 61' dos Santos (yellow card) 69'	Report	Picault 13'; Vera (yellow card) 51'; Cerén (yellow card) 65'; Valentin (yellow card) 79'; Quintero (yellow card) 86'; García (yellow card) 90+4'	Stadium: Dignity Health Sports Park; Attendance: 15,341; Referee: Kevin Stott

September 18 26 Texas Derby	Houston Dynamo	3–2	FC Dallas	Houston, Texas
8:30 PM CDT	Dorsey 5'; Picault 20'; Valentin (yellow card) 40'; Quintero 59' (pen.)	Report	Obrian 86', 90+4'; Schön (yellow card) 90+6'	Stadium: BBVA Stadium; Attendance: 12,353; Referee: Victor Rivas

September 25 27	Minnesota United FC	2–0	Houston Dynamo	Saint Paul, Minnesota
7:00 PM CDT	Lod 5'; Finlay 5'; Reynoso (yellow card) 40'	Report	Quintero (yellow card) 41'; Junqua (yellow card) 72'	Stadium: Allianz Field; Attendance: 19,471; Referee: Allen Chapman

September 29 28	Houston Dynamo	0–0	Vancouver Whitecaps FC	Houston, Texas
8:00 PM CDT		Report	Baldisimo (yellow card) 47'; Dájome (yellow card) 55'	Stadium: BBVA Stadium; Attendance: 12,114; Referee: Alan Kelly

October 3 29	Sporting Kansas City	4–2	Houston Dynamo	Kansas City, Kansas
3:00 PM CDT	Russell 16' (pen.), 90'; Sallói 26'; Kinda 57'; Zusi (yellow card) 85'	Report	Junqua (yellow card) 16'; Hadebe (yellow card) 27'; Picault 50'; Vera (yellow card) 53'; Quintero 76'	Stadium: Children's Mercy Park; Attendance: 17,867; Referee: Alex Chilowicz

October 16 30	Houston Dynamo	2–1	Seattle Sounders FC	Houston, Texas
7:30 PM CDT	Urruti 14'; Quintero 20'; Figueroa (yellow card) 79'; Corona (yellow card) 90+2'	Report	Medranda 41'; Arreaga (yellow card) 54'; João Paulo (yellow card) 90+4'	Stadium: BBVA Stadium; Attendance: 14,265; Referee: Nima Saghafi

October 20 31	Houston Dynamo	0–3	LA Galaxy	Houston, Texas
7:30 PM CDT	Figueroa (yellow card) 79'	Report	Hernández (yellow card) 9'; Araujo (yellow card) 11'; Kljestan 39' (pen.); Valenin 45+1' (o.g.); Cabreal 47'; DePuy (yellow card) 84'	Stadium: BBVA Stadium; Attendance: 13,798; Referee: Rosendo Mendoza

October 24 32 Copa Tejas	Austin FC	2–1	Houston Dynamo	Austin, Texas
3:00 PM CDT	Marić 7' (o.g.); Pereira (yellow card) 38'; Driussi 45+4' (Ring), (yellow card) 47'; Kolmanič (yellow card) 54'	Report	Cerén (yellow card) 11'; Vera (yellow card) 74'; Cascante 90+2' (o.g.)	Stadium: Q2 Stadium; Attendance: 20,738; Referee: Timothy Ford

October 31 33	Houston Dynamo	1–0	Colorado Rapids	Houston, Texas
2:00 PM CDT	Carrasquilla (yellow card) 29'; Rodríguez (yellow card) 44'; Corona (yellow card) 52'	Report	Badji (yellow card) 10' (goal) 58'; Bassett (yellow card) 75'; Shinyashiki (yellow card) 90+6'	Stadium: BBVA Stadium; Attendance: 14,474; Referee: Guido Gonzalez Jr.

November 3 34	CF Montréal	2–0	Houston Dynamo	Montreal, Quebec
7:30 PM CDT	Camacho 58'; Miller 62'; Breza (yellow card) 90+1'	Report	Hoffmann (yellow card) 44'; Lassiter (yellow card) 53'; Carrasquilla (yellow card) 85'	Stadium: Saputo Stadium; Referee: Ted Unkel

=== U.S. Open Cup ===
On July 20, U.S. Soccer announced that the Open Cup would be cancelled for 2021 and would resume in 2022.

== Season statistics ==
No.	Pos	Nat	Player	Total					MLS				
No.	Pos	Nat	Player	Apps	Goals	Assists	Booked	Sent off (straight red)	Apps	Goals	Assists	Booked	Sent off (straight red)
1	GK	(Croatia)	Marko Marić	22	0	0	0	0	22	0	0	0	0
2	DF	(Venezuela)	Alejandro Fuenmayor	3	0	0	0	0	3	0	0	0	0
3	DF	(Sweden)	Adam Lundqvist	25	0	2	1	0	25	0	2	1	0
4	DF	(Puerto Rico)	Zarek Valentin	29	0	1	5	0	29	0	1	5	0
5	DF	(United States)	Tim Parker	34	0	0	3	0	34	0	0	3	0
7	FW	(Argentina)	Mateo Bajamich	9	0	1	1	0	9	0	1	1	0
8	MF	(United States)	Memo Rodríguez	31	2	2	3	0	31	2	2	3	0
9	FW	(United States)	Christian Ramirez (Note: Transferred out during the season)	6	1	0	0	0	6	1	0	0	0
10	MF	(United States)	Fafà Picault	31	11	5	9	0	31	11	5	9	0
11	FW	(Costa Rica)	Ariel Lassiter	19	0	0	1	0	19	0	0	1	0
12	FW	(United States)	Corey Baird	7	0	0	0	0	7	0	0	0	0
13	DF	(United States)	Ethan Bartlow	0	0	0	0	0	0	0	0	0	0
14	MF	(United States)	Joe Corona	30	0	2	5	0	30	0	2	5	0
14	MF	(United States)	Marcelo Palomino (Note: Loaned out during the season)	0	0	0	0	0	0	0	0	0	0
15	DF	(Honduras)	Maynor Figueroa	13	0	2	4	0	13	0	2	4	0
16	DF	(Chile)	José Bizama	1	0	0	0	0	1	0	0	0	0
17	MF	(United States)	Nico Lemoine	1	0	0	0	0	1	0	0	0	0
18	DF	(Zimbabwe)	Teenage Hadebe	17	0	1	3	0	17	0	1	3	0
19	FW	(Canada)	Tyler Pasher	19	4	3	0	0	19	4	3	0	0
20	MF	(Panama)	Adalberto Carrasquilla	10	1	0	2	0	10	1	0	2	0
21	MF	(United States)	Derrick Jones	20	0	1	4	0	20	0	1	4	0
22	MF	(Argentina)	Matías Vera	30	3	1	9	0	31	3	1	0	0
23	FW	(Colombia)	Darwin Quintero	20	3	2	2	0	20	3	2	2	0
24	MF	(El Salvador)	Darwin Cerén	25	0	2	4	1	25	0	2	4	1
25	MF	(United States)	Griffin Dorsey	20	2	3	2	0	20	2	3	2	0
26	GK	(United States)	Michael Nelson	11	0	0	0	0	11	0	0	0	0
27	MF	(Honduras)	Boniek García	16	0	0	4	0	16	0	0	4	0
28	DF	(United States)	Erik McCue	0	0	0	0	0	0	0	0	0	0
29	DF	(United States)	Sam Junqua	22	0	1	4	0	22	0	1	4	0
30	MF	(United States)	Ian Hoffmann	6	0	0	1	0	6	0	0	1	0
31	GK	(United States)	Kyle Morton	1	0	0	0	0	1	0	0	0	0
32	MF	(Colombia)	Juan Castilla	2	0	0	0	0	2	0	0	0	0
33	FW	(El Salvador)	Danny Ríos	0	0	0	0	0	0	0	0	0	0
37	FW	(Argentina)	Maximiliano Urruti	30	7	4	4	0	30	7	4	4	0

Source: Player Stats and Match reports in Competitions

== Honors and awards ==
=== MLS Team of the Week ===
Week	Team of the Week		Ref
Week	Starting XI	Bench	Ref
1	(Honduras) Boniek García (United States) Memo Rodriguez		
6	(United States) Memo Rodriguez (2)		
8		(Argentina) Maximiliano Urruti	
10	(Croatia) Marko Marić		
24	(United States) Fafà Picault		
25	(United States) Michael Nelson		
26		(United States) Griffin Dorsey	
28		(Zimbabwe) Teenage Hadebe	
30	(Colombia) Darwin Quintero		

=== MLS Goal of the Week ===
Week	Player	Opponent	Date	Ref.
30	(Colombia) Darwin Quintero	Seattle Sounders FC	October 16	

=== Dynamo team awards ===
MVP	Defensive Player of the Year	Newcomer of the Year	Young Player of the Year	Players' Player of the Year	Ref.
(United States) Fafà Picault	(Zimbabwe) Teenage Hadebe	(Zimbabwe) Teenage Hadebe	(United States) Griffin Dorsey	(United States) Fafà Picault	
