= Sam Junqua =

American soccer player (born 1996)

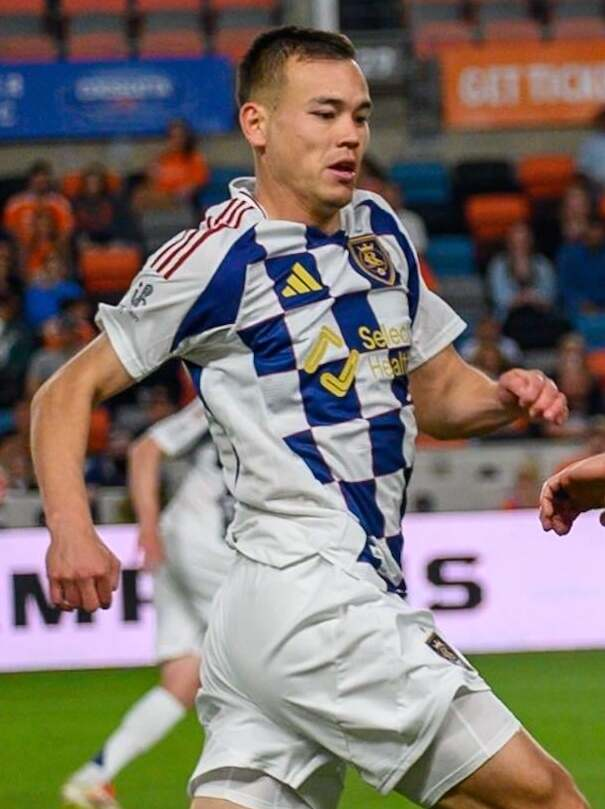
- Junqua with Real Salt Lake in 2025

Personal information
- Full name: Samuel Junqua
- Date of birth: November 9, 1996 (age 29)
- Place of birth: Saratoga, California, United States
- Height: 6 ft 0 in (1.83 m)
- Position: Defender

Team information
- Current team: Real Salt Lake

Youth career
- De Anza Force

College career
Years	Team	Apps	(Gls)
2015–2018	California Golden Bears	68	(0)

Senior career*
Years	Team	Apps	(Gls)
2017	FC Golden State Force	7	(0)
2018	San Francisco Glens	6	(1)
2019–2022	Houston Dynamo	46	(1)
2019	→ Rio Grande Valley FC (loan)	17	(0)
2023–2024	FC Dallas	54	(3)
2025–	Real Salt Lake	32	(1)
- * Club domestic league appearances and goals as of November 25, 2025

Samuel Junqua (born November 9, 1996) is an American professional soccer player who plays as a defender for Major League Soccer club Real Salt Lake.

== Career ==
=== Youth and college ===
Junqua attended the University of California, Berkeley, where he played college soccer for four years between 2015 and 2018, making 68 appearances and tallying 3 assists. He was named to the 2018 All-Pac-12 third team.

While in college, Junqua played in the PDL with FC Golden State Force and San Francisco Glens.

=== Professional career ===
==== Houston Dynamo ====
On January 11, 2019, Junqua was drafted 8th overall in the 2019 MLS SuperDraft by the Houston Dynamo and was signed by the club on January 22, 2019. Junqua made his Dynamo debut on June 18, getting the start in a 3–2 loss to Minnesota United in a U.S. Open Cup match. He made his first appearance in a continental competition and his second overall appearance with the Dynamo on July 24, coming on as a sub in a Leagues Cup match with Club America.

Junqua spent most of the 2019 season on loan with the Dynamo's USL Championship affiliate Rio Grande Valley FC. He made his first appearance for the Toros on March 16, playing the full 90 in a 2–0 loss to Fresno FC. He would go on to make 17 appearances with RGVFC in his first pro season.

On July 13, 2020, Junqua made his first appearance of the season and first MLS appearance of his career, coming on as a substitute in a 3–3 draw with LAFC. He scored his first goal for the Dynamo on October 3 in a 2–1 loss to Sporting Kansas City. He made his first career MLS start on October 7 in a 2–0 win over Texas Derby rivals FC Dallas. Junqua finished the year with 9 appearances and 1 goal in a shortened season due to the COVID-19 pandemic. It was a poor season for Houston as a team, finishing last in the Western Conference and missing out on the playoffs again.

Junqua missed the first 8 games of the 2021 season after suffering a concussion in the final preseason match. He made his first appearance of the season on June 19, playing the full 90 minutes in a 1–1 draw against LAFC. On July 3, Junqua picked up his first career MLS assist in a 1–1 draw with FC Cincinnati. He ended the season with 22 appearances, 18 of them starts, and 1 assist, splitting time playing as both a left-back and as a center-back. The season was another disappointing one for Houston, with the Dynamo finishing last in the West for the 2nd straight season and failing to qualify for the playoffs once again.

Junqua made 15 MLS appearances, 4 of them starts, and had an assist during the 2022 season as the Dynamo finished 13th in the conference, missing out on the playoffs. In the Open Cup, Junqua started all 3 games for Houston. On April 19, in their first cup game of the season, Junqua scored 3 minutes into stoppage time to give the Dynamo a 2–1 win over RGVFC. In the next round, he set up Sebastián Ferreira in the 82nd minute for a 1–0 win over San Antonio FC. Junqua's contract expired following the 2022 season.

==== FC Dallas ====
On February 23, 2023, Junqua signed with FC Dallas after the club acquired his rights from Houston in exchange for $75,000 of GAM.

==== Real Salt Lake ====
On December 23, 2024, Real Salt Lake acquired Junqua from FC Dallas and up to $500k in GAM in exchange for Anderson Julio.

== Career statistics ==
As of February 19, 2023

Club	Season	League			Playoffs		National cup		Continental		Total	
Club	Season	Division	Apps	Goals	Apps	Goals	Apps	Goals	Apps	Goals	Apps	Goals
FC Golden State Force	2017	PDL	7	0	0	0	1	0	—		8	0
San Francisco Glens	2018	PDL	6	1	—		–		—		6	1
Houston Dynamo	2019	MLS	0	0	—		1	0	1 (Note: Appearance in Leagues Cup)	0	2	0
Houston Dynamo	2020	MLS	9	1	—		—		—		9	1
Houston Dynamo	2021	MLS	22	0	—		—		—		22	0
Houston Dynamo	2022	MLS	15	0	—		3	1	—		18	1
Houston Dynamo	Total		46	1	0	0	4	1	1	0	51	2
Rio Grande Valley FC (loan)	2019	USLC	17	0	—		—		—		17	0
Career total			76	2	0	0	5	1	1	0	82	3
