= Gonzalo Casazza =

Argentine footballer (born 1999)

Personal information
- Full name: Gonzalo Adrián Casazza
- Date of birth: 23 February 1999 (age 27)
- Place of birth: Argentina
- Height: 1.82 m (6 ft 0 in)
- Position: Central midfielder

Team information
- Current team: Atlanta (on loan from Lanús)

Youth career
- Lanús

Senior career*
Years	Team	Apps	(Gls)
2020–	Lanús	1	(0)
2021–	→ Atlanta (loan)	0	(0)
- * Club domestic league appearances and goals as of 19:20, 24 February 2021 (UTC)

Gonzalo Adrián Casazza (born 23 February 1999) is an Argentine professional footballer who plays as a central midfielder for Atlanta, on loan from Lanús.

== Career ==
Casazza is a product of the Lanús youth system. He was promoted into their first-team squad in mid-2020, notably scoring in friendlies with Defensores de Belgrano and San Lorenzo before appearing on the bench in the succeeding December and January for Copa de la Liga Profesional fixtures away to Aldosivi and Patronato. Casazza's senior debut arrived in that competition on 9 January 2021, with the midfielder coming off the bench to replace Lucas Vera with twelve minutes remaining of a 2–0 home win over Rosario Central. He was loaned to Primera Nacional's Atlanta in February, debuting in a Copa Argentina tie with Villa San Carlos.

== Career statistics ==
As of 24 February 2021.

Appearances and goals by club, season and competition
Club	Season	League			Cup		League Cup		Continental		Other		Total	
Club	Season	Division	Apps	Goals	Apps	Goals	Apps	Goals	Apps	Goals	Apps	Goals	Apps	Goals
Lanús	2020–21 (Note: Soccerway counts 2020 Copa de la Liga Profesional appearances as league appearances.)	Primera División	1	0	0	0	0	0	0	0	0	0	1	0
Lanús	2021 (Note: Soccerway counts 2021 Copa de la Liga Profesional appearances as league appearances.)	Primera División	0	0	0	0	—		0	0	0	0	0	0
Lanús	Total		1	0	0	0	0	0	0	0	0	0	1	0
Atlanta (loan)	2021	Primera Nacional	0	0	1	0	—		—		0	0	1	0
Career total			1	0	1	0	0	0	0	0	0	0	2	0
