= Juan Castilla (footballer) =

Colombian footballer

Personal information
- Full name: Juan Andres Castilla Lozano
- Date of birth: July 27, 2004 (age 22)
- Place of birth: Cali, Colombia
- Height: 1.77 m (5 ft 10 in)
- Position: Midfielder

Team information
- Current team: Llaneros
- Number: 13

Youth career
- 2016–: Houston Dynamo
- –2019: Columbus Crew
- 2019–2020: Houston Dynamo

Senior career*
Years	Team	Apps	(Gls)
2020	Rio Grande Valley FC	0	(0)
2021–2023	Houston Dynamo	2	(0)
2022–2023	Houston Dynamo 2	24	(2)
2023	Deportivo Cali	14	(0)
2024–2025	Deportivo Pasto	30	(1)
2025	La Equidad	17	(1)
2026–	Llaneros	1	(0)

International career^{‡}
2022	United States U17	1	(0)
2022	United States U19	2	(0)
2022–2023	Colombia U20	20	(0)
2023	Colombia U23	4	(0)
- * Club domestic league appearances and goals as of 16:33, 5 August 2026 (UTC) ‡ National team caps and goals as of 21:25, 21 February 2023 (UTC)

Juan Andres Castilla Lozano (born July 27, 2004) is a Colombian professional footballer who plays as a midfielder for Llaneros.

== Career ==
=== Youth ===
Castilla joined the Houston Dynamo pre-academy teams when he was 7. In 2016, at the age of 11, he moved to the Dynamo Academy. He spent some time training in Spain and with the Columbus Crew Academy before returning to the Dynamo in 2019.

=== Professional ===
==== Houston Dynamo ====
On 14 June 2020, Castilla signed a Homegrown contract with the Houston Dynamo. The contract went into effect on 1 January 2021. At 15 years old, Castilla became the youngest homegrown signing in club history. He spent the rest of 2020 with Houston's USL Championship affiliate, RGVFC. He made his professional debut on 31 October 2021, coming on as late substitute for Memo Rodríguez in a 1–0 home defeat to the Colorado Rapids. Castilla ended the 2021 season with 2 appearances.

During the 2022 season, Castilla primarily played with Houston Dynamo 2 in MLS Next Pro, where he had 1 goal and 4 assists in 17 appearances. His one first team appearance of the season was a substitute appearance in the Open Cup.

On 23 July 2023, Castilla signed with Categoría Primera A side Deportivo Cali.

== Career statistics ==
=== Club ===
As of match played February 21, 2023

Appearances and goals by club, season and competition
Club	Season	League			National cup		Continental		Playoffs		Total	
Club	Season	Division	Apps	Goals	Apps	Goals	Apps	Goals	Apps	Goals	Apps	Goals
Rio Grande Valley FC	2020	USL Championship	0	0	—		—		—		0	0
Houston Dynamo	2021	Major League Soccer	2	0	—		—		—		2	0
Houston Dynamo	2022	Major League Soccer	0	0	1	0	—		—		1	0
Houston Dynamo	2023	Major League Soccer	0	0	0	0	0	0	0	0	0	0
Houston Dynamo	Total		2	0	1	0	0	0	0	0	3	0
Houston Dynamo 2	2022	MLS Next Pro	17	1	—		—		0	0	17	1
Career total			19	1	1	0	0	0	0	0	19	1

== Personal life ==
Castilla was born in Cali, Colombia. When he was 3, his family moved to Houston, Texas.
