= Thorleifur Úlfarsson =

Icelandic footballer

Personal information
- Full name: Þorleifur Úlfarsson
- Date of birth: 27 December 2000 (age 25)
- Place of birth: Reykjavík, Iceland
- Height: 1.85 m (6 ft 1 in)
- Position: Forward

Team information
- Current team: Breiðablik
- Number: 99

Youth career
- 2006–2016: Breiðablik
- 2016–2018: Stjarnan
- 2018–2019: Breiðablik

College career
| Years | Team | Apps | (Gls) |
| 2021 | Duke Blue Devils | 25 | (19) |

Senior career*
| Years | Team | Apps | (Gls) |
| 2019–2021 | Breiðablik | 1 | (0) |
| 2019–2020 | → Augnablik (loan) | 21 | (10) |
| 2020–2021 | → Víkingur Ólafsvík (loan) | 11 | (2) |
| 2022–2023 | Houston Dynamo | 49 | (7) |
| 2023 | Houston Dynamo 2 | 2 | (0) |
| 2024–2025 | Debrecen | 3 | (0) |
| 2025 | Breiðablik | 3 | (0) |
| 2026 | Loudoun United | 16 | (8) |
| 2026– | Breiðablik | 10 | (2) |

International career^{‡}
| 2022 | Iceland U21 | 3 | (0) |
- * Club domestic league appearances and goals as of 1 November 2026 ‡ National team caps and goals as of 16 January 2024

Thorleifur Úlfarsson (Icelandic: Þorleifur Úlfarsson; born 27 December 2000) is an Icelandic professional footballer who plays as a forward for Breiðablik.

== Club career ==
=== Youth and domestic ===
Thorleifur began playing with Breiðablik at age 6. From 2016 to 2018, he joined the Stjarnan youth ranks, but returned to Breiðablik in 2018. Thorleifur spent time on loan at Augnablik during the 2019 and 2020 seasons, where he made 21 appearances and scored 10 goals in the 3. deild karla, the 4th tier of Icelandic football. He also was loaned to Víkingur Ólafsvík for parts of the 2020 and 2021 seasons, where he scored 2 goals in 11 appearances in the 1. deild karla. Thorleifur made 3 first team appearances for his boyhood club Breiðablik, 2 in the League Cup and 1 in the Úrvalsdeild before leaving for Duke.

=== College ===
In February 2021, Thorleifur joined the Duke Blue Devils to play college soccer in the United States. During one and a half seasons with the Blue Devils, he scored nineteen goals and had 2 assists in twenty five matches. Following his first half-season, he was named the team's Most Valuable Offensive Player and was named to the Atlantic Coast Conference (ACC) All-Freshman Team, All-ACC Academic Team, and ACC Academic Honor Roll. Following the 2021 season, he was named ACC Offensive Player of the Year, was a MAC Hermann Trophy semi-finalist, and was named Duke Most Valuable Offensive Player. He was also named to the United Soccer Coaches All-American First Team and All-ACC First Team. Following his second year at Duke, it was announced that Thorleifur had signed a Generation Adidas contract with Major League Soccer ahead of the 2022 MLS SuperDraft.

=== Houston Dynamo ===
On 11 January 2022, Thorleifur was selected with the fourth overall pick by the Houston Dynamo in the 2022 MLS SuperDraft. He made his Dynamo debut on 27 February 2022, coming off the bench in the 81st minute during a 0–0 draw against Real Salt Lake in Houston's opening match of the season. He scored his first goal for the Dynamo on 22 May, helping Houston to a 3–0 win over the LA Galaxy. Thorleifur finished his rookie season with 4 goals and 1 assist in 31 MLS appearances, 11 of them starts. It was a disappointing season for the Dynamo as a team, missing out on the playoffs after finishing 13th in the Western Conference.

=== Debrecen ===
On 21 January 2024, signed with Hungarian NB I side Debrecen.

=== Loudoun United FC ===
In January, 2026, Loudoun United of the USL Championship announced they had signed Thorleifur to a 2-year contract.

=== Career statistics ===
As of 15 October 2022

| Club | Season | League | | | National Cup (Note: Includes Icelandic Cup and U.S. Open Cup) | | League Cup (Note: Includes Icelandic League Cup, Icelandic League Cup B, and MLS Cup Playoffs) | | Continental | | Total | |
| Club | Season | Division | Apps | Goals | Apps | Goals | Apps | Goals | Apps | Goals | Apps | Goals |
|---|---|---|---|---|---|---|---|---|---|---|---|---|
| Breiðablik | 2020 | Úrvalsdeild | 0 | 0 | 0 | 0 | 2 | 0 | 0 | 0 | 2 | 0 |
| Breiðablik | 2021 | Úrvalsdeild | 1 | 0 | 0 | 0 | 0 | 0 | 0 | 0 | 1 | 0 |
| Breiðablik | Total | | 1 | 0 | 0 | 0 | 2 | 0 | 0 | 0 | 3 | 0 |
| Augnablik (loan) | 2019 | 3. deild karla | 13 | 4 | 2 | 1 | 0 | 0 | — | | 15 | 5 |
| Augnablik (loan) | 2020 | 3. deild karla | 8 | 6 | 1 | 0 | 3 | 1 | — | | 12 | 7 |
| Augnablik (loan) | Total | | 21 | 10 | 3 | 1 | 3 | 1 | 0 | 0 | 27 | 12 |
| Víkingur Ólafsvík(loan) | 2020 | 1. deild karla | 5 | 1 | 0 | 0 | 0 | 0 | — | | 5 | 1 |
| Víkingur Ólafsvík(loan) | 2021 | 1. deild karla | 6 | 1 | 2 | 2 | 0 | 0 | — | | 8 | 3 |
| Víkingur Ólafsvík(loan) | Total | | 11 | 2 | 2 | 2 | 0 | 0 | 0 | 0 | 13 | 4 |
| Houston Dynamo | 2022 | Major League Soccer | 31 | 4 | 2 | 0 | 0 | 0 | — | | 33 | 4 |
| Career Total | | | 64 | 16 | 7 | 3 | 5 | 1 | 0 | 0 | 76 | 20 |

== Personal life ==
Thorleifur was born in Reykjavík, Iceland to Úlfar Helgason and Gudfinna Kristofersdottir and was raised in the neighboring town of Kópavogur. He has 2 brothers and 1 sister. Thorleifur is a fan of English club Manchester United, with Cristiano Ronaldo being his favorite player.
