= Nico Lemoine =

American soccer player (born 2000)

Personal information
- Date of birth: April 10, 2000 (age 26)
- Place of birth: Livermore, California, United States
- Height: 1.73 m (5 ft 8 in)
- Position: Midfielder

Youth career
- 2015–2016: De Anza Force
- 2016–2018: San Jose Earthquakes
- 2018–2019: Houston Dynamo

Senior career*
Years	Team	Apps	(Gls)
2019	Rio Grande Valley FC	19	(2)
2020–2022	Houston Dynamo	12	(0)
2022	→ Oakland Roots (loan)	0	(0)
- * Club domestic league appearances and goals as of May 2, 2022

Nico Lemoine (born April 10, 2000) is an American professional soccer player who plays as a winger. He is currently a free agent.

== Career ==
=== Youth ===
Lemoine spent time with De Anza Force before joining the San Jose Earthquakes academy. He would spend time training with the Earthquakes USL affiliate club, Reno 1868, during the summer of 2017.

Lemoine joined the Houston Dynamo academy during 2018. He would lead the Dynamo U-19s with six assists during the 2018 U.S. Soccer Development Academy season.

=== Professional ===
Lemoine signed a contract with the Dynamo's USL Championship affiliate, Rio Grande Valley FC, ahead of the 2019 season. He made his professional debut on March 23, coming on as a substitute in a 2–2 draw with El Paso Locomotive. In the Toros next game, Lemoine scored his first professional goal in a 2–1 loss to the Tulsa Roughnecks. On September 15 he scored in a 2–1 loss to Sacramento Republic. Lemoine ended his first pro season with 2 goals and 1 assist from 19 games for the Toros

On June 11, 2020, Lemoine signed a contract with the Dynamo. He made his Dynamo debut on July 13, coming off the bench in a 3–3 draw with LAFC. Lemoine ended the 2020 season with 11 appearances, all as a substitute, as Houston finished last in the Western Conference, missing out on the playoffs.

During the 2021 season, Lemoine made just 1 appearance as the Dynam finished last in the West again.

On March 9, 2022, Lemoine was loaned to USL Championship club Oakland Roots for the 2022 season. On April 26, after not making Oakland's match day squad during the first 9 games of the season, the Dynamo recalled Lemoine and waived him.

== Career statistics ==
As of May 2, 2022

Club	Season	League			US Open Cup		Playoffs (Note: Includes USL Championship Playoffs and MLS Cup Playoffs)		Continental		Total	
Club	Season	Division	Apps	Goals	Apps	Goals	Apps	Goals	Apps	Goals	Apps	Goals
Rio Grande Valley FC	2019	USL Championship	19	2	—		—		—		19	2
Houston Dynamo	2020	Major League Soccer	11	0	—		—		—		11	0
Houston Dynamo	2021	Major League Soccer	1	0	—		—		—		1	0
Houston Dynamo	2022	Major League Soccer	0	0	0	0	0	0	—		0	0
Houston Dynamo	Total		12	0	0	0	0	0	0	0	12	0
Oakland Roots (loan)	2022	USL Championship	0	0	0	0	0	0	—		0	0
Career Total			31	2	0	0	0	0	0	0	31	2
