= Danny Ríos =

Salvadoran footballer (born 2003)

Personal information
- Full name: Daniel Esteban Ríos
- Date of birth: March 29, 2003 (age 23)
- Place of birth: Houston, Texas, United States
- Height: 1.78 m (5 ft 10 in)
- Position: Midfielder

Youth career
- 2013–2020: Houston Dynamo

Senior career*
Years	Team	Apps	(Gls)
2021–2023	Houston Dynamo	0	(0)
2022	Houston Dynamo 2	5	(0)
2023	→ Las Vegas Lights (loan)	22	(5)
2024	San Antonio FC	1	(0)

International career^{‡}
2021–	El Salvador	3	(0)
- * Club domestic league appearances and goals as of October 31, 2024 ‡ National team caps and goals as of December 8, 2021

Daniel Esteban Ríos (born March 29, 2003) is a professional footballer who plays as a midfielder. Born in the United States, he plays for the El Salvador national team.

== Club career ==
=== Houston Dynamo ===
Ríos joined the Houston Dynamo Academy in 2013 at the age of 10. On July 10, 2020, he signed a Homegrown Player contract with the Dynamo, effective January 1, 2021. Ríos spent the remainder of the 2020 training with the first team and playing for the academy.

Ríos made no first team appearances during the 2021 season. He spent 2022 playing with Houston Dynamo 2 in MLS Next Pro, making 6 appearances.

On 9 September 2024, Ríos signed with USL Championship side San Antonio FC.

== International career ==
Born in the United States, Ríos is of Salvadoran descent. He was eligible to represent both the U.S. and El Salvador. On March 4, 2021, Ríos announced that he would represent El Salvador internationally. He made his debut for El Salvador on June 26, 2021, coming on as a substitute in a 0–0 draw with Guatemala in a friendly

== Career statistics ==
=== Club ===
As of match played February 23, 2023

Appearances and goals by club, season and competition
Club	Season	League			Cup		Playoffs		Continental		Total	
Club	Season	Division	Apps	Goals	Apps	Goals	Apps	Goals	Apps	Goals	Apps	Goals
Houston Dynamo	2021	Major League Soccer	0	0	—		—		—		0	0
Houston Dynamo	2022	Major League Soccer	0	0	0	0	0	0	0	0	0	0
Houston Dynamo 2	2022	MLS Next Pro	5	0	0	0	1	0	0	0	6	0
Career total			5	0	0	0	1	0	0	0	6	0

=== International ===
As of December 8, 2021

National Team	Year	Apps	Goals
El Salvador	2021	3	0
Total		3	0
