= José Bizama =

Chilean footballer (born 1994)

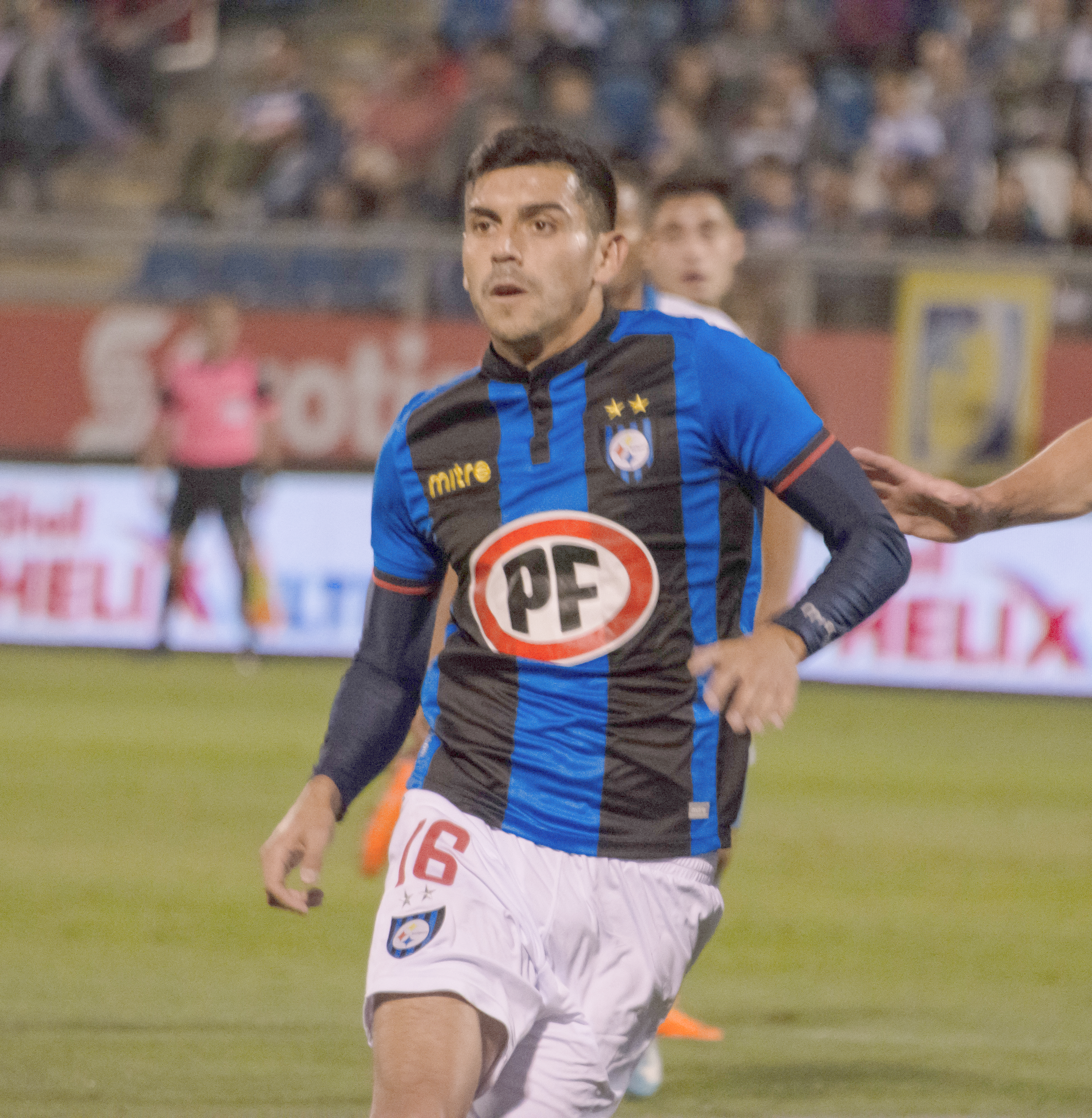
- Bizama with Huachipato in 2018.

Personal information
- Full name: José Carlos Bizama Venegas
- Date of birth: 25 June 1994 (age 32)
- Place of birth: Curanilahue, Chile
- Height: 1.81 m (5 ft 11 in)
- Position: Defender

Team information
- Current team: Palestino
- Number: 16

Youth career
- Huachipato

Senior career*
Years	Team	Apps	(Gls)
2014–2019	Huachipato	93	(5)
2019–2021	Houston Dynamo	14	(0)
2021	→ Charlotte Independence (loan)	9	(0)
2022–	Palestino	47	(1)

International career
2018–	Chile	4	(0)
- * Club domestic league appearances and goals as of 19:20, 26 April 2025 (UTC)

José Carlos Bizama Venegas (born 25 June 1994) is a Chilean professional footballer who plays as a defender for Palestino and the Chile national team.

== Club career ==
=== Huachipato ===
Born in Curanilahue, Bizama began his career with Chilean Primera División club Huachipato; joining Los Acereros when he was 16. He made his professional debut on 22 May 2014, coming on as a sub in a 5–4 win over Deportes Concepción in a Copa Chile match. Bizama made his Primera División debut on 8 August 2014 in a 2–1 against Deportes Iquique. He made his first appearance in an international competition on 12 August 2015 when he got the start in a 2–0 defeat to Club Olimpia in the Copa Sudamericana. Bizama scored his first professional goal on 16 January 2016 in a 3–0 win over C.D. Universidad de Concepción.

=== Houston Dynamo ===
On 11 July 2019, Bizama signed with Major League Soccer club Houston Dynamo. However, Bizama wasn't officially added to the roster or allowed to train with the team until 2 August due to issues obtaining a visa. He made his Dynamo debut on 11 August, getting the start in a 2–1 defeat to the Philadelphia Union. Bizama would go on to make 5 appearances, 4 of them starts, in his first season with Houston.

On 28 February 2020, Bizama suffered a broken leg in practice the day before the Dynamo season opener. He underwent surgery on 2 March. He made his first appearance of the season on 9 September, playing the full match in a 1–1 draw at the Colorado Rapids. Bizama would go on to appear in 8 games in a shortened season due to the COVID-19 pandemic as Houston finished bottom of the Western Conference, missing out on the playoffs again.

On 15 May, Bizama made his first appearance of the 2021 season, playing the full 90 minutes in a 3–1 loss to the Rapids. That would be his only appearance of the season for the Dynamo.

On 5 August 2021, Bizama joined USL Championship side Charlotte Independence on loan for the remainder of the season. He made his Independence debut on 8 September, playing 90 minutes in a 5–0 win over Loudoun United. Bizama made 9 regular season appearances for the Independence, helping Charlotte finish 2nd in the Atlantic Division and qualify for the playoffs. He came off the bench in both of Charlotte's playoff games as they reached the conference semifinals, where they lost 1–0 to Louisville City.

Following the 2021 season, Bizama's contract option was declined by Houston. In January 2022 he signed for Palestino.

== International career ==
On 17 May 2018, Bizama was called up by Reinaldo Rueda to the Chile national team for 3 friendlies. Bizama would make his debut on 31 May, coming on as a sub in a 3–2 loss to Romania. He would also make 2 more appearances 4 and 8 June, coming on as a sub against Serbia and Poland, respectively. On 28 August 2019, Bizama was called back into the national squad by Rueda for two friendlies. He would come on as a sub in a 2–1 loss to Honduras to earn his 4th cap for La Roja.

== Playing style ==
He is nicknamed "La Flecha" ("The Arrow") due to his speed.

== Career statistics ==
=== Club statistics ===
As of 26 April 2025

Appearances and goals by club, season and competition
Club	Season	League			National Cup (Note: Includes Copa Chile and U.S. Open Cup)		League Cup (Note: Includes MLS Cup Playoffs and USL Championship playoffs)		Continental		Total	
Club	Season	Division	Apps	Goals	Apps	Goals	Apps	Goals	Apps	Goals	Apps	Goals
Huachipato	2014–15	Chilean Primera División	0	0	2	0	—		0	0	2	0
Huachipato	2015–16	Chilean Primera División	14	1	5	0	—		2 (Note: Appearances in Copa Sudamericana)	0	21	1
Huachipato	2016–17	Chilean Primera División	24	1	2	0	—		—		26	1
Huachipato	2017	Chilean Primera División	14	0	6	1	—		—		20	1
Huachipato	2018	Chilean Primera División	27	1	5	1	—		—		32	2
Huachipato	2019	Chilean Primera División	14	2	1	0	—		—		15	2
Huachipato	Total		93	5	21	2	2	0	0	0	116	7
Houston Dynamo	2019	Major League Soccer	5	0	0	0	—		0	0	5	0
Houston Dynamo	2020	Major League Soccer	8	0	—		—		—		8	0
Houston Dynamo	2021	Major League Soccer	1	0	—		—		—		1	0
Houston Dynamo	Total		14	0	0	0	0	0	0	0	14	0
Charlotte Independence (loan)	2021	USL Championship	9	0	—		2	0	—		11	0
Palestino	2022	Chilean Primera División	27	1	2	0	—		—		29	1
Palestino	2023	Chilean Primera División	12	0	—		—		1	0	13	0
Palestino	2024	Chilean Primera División	8	0	4	1	—		4 (Note: Appearances in Copa Libertadores)	0	16	1
Palestino	2025	Chilean Primera División	0	0	1	0	—		0	0	1	0
Palestino	Total		47	1	7	1	—		5	0	59	2
Career total			163	6	28	3	2	0	7	0	200	9

=== International statistics ===
As of 11 November 2020

National Team	Year	Apps	Goals
Chile	2018	3	0
Chile	2019	1	0
Total		4	0
