= Sebastián Ferreira =

Paraguayan football player (born 1998)

Personal information
- Full name: Carlos Sebastián Ferreira Vidal
- Date of birth: 13 February 1998 (age 28)
- Place of birth: Asunción, Paraguay
- Height: 5 ft 11 in (1.81 m)
- Position: Forward

Team information
- Current team: Olimpia
- Number: 9

Youth career
- –2016: Olimpia

Senior career*
| Years | Team | Apps | (Gls) |
| 2016–2018 | Olimpia | 17 | (1) |
| 2017–2018 | → Independiente CG (loan) | 30 | (15) |
| 2018–2020 | Morelia | 51 | (16) |
| 2020 | → Libertad (loan) | 39 | (20) |
| 2021 | Libertad | 44 | (10) |
| 2022–2025 | Houston Dynamo | 60 | (18) |
| 2023 | → Vasco da Gama (loan) | 13 | (0) |
| 2025 | Rosario Central | 8 | (2) |
| 2025– | Olimpia | 3 | (3) |

International career^{‡}
| 2015 | Paraguay U17 | 11 | (6) |
| 2017 | Paraguay U20 | 4 | (1) |
| 2015 | Paraguay U23 | 2 | (2) |
| 2022– | Paraguay | 5 | (0) |
- * Club domestic league appearances and goals as of 13 August 2025 ‡ National team caps and goals as of 23:05, 21 November 2023 (UTC)

Carlos Sebastián Ferreira Vidal (born 13 February 1998) is a Paraguayan professional footballer who plays as a forward for Olimpia.

== Club career ==
=== Club Olimpia ===
Ferreira joined the academy for Club Olimpia when he was 10 years old. He made his first team debut on 13 April 2016, coming on as a substitute in a 4–0 win over Deportivo Táchira in a Copa Libertadores match. On 29 October 2016 Ferreira made his Primera División, coming off the bench in a 1–0 loss to Deportivo Capiatá.

Ferreira scored his first senior goal on 18 June 2017 in a 2–2 draw against Club Sol de América. The 2017 Apertura season saw Ferreira feature more frequently in the first team. He made 14 appearances in Primera División play, 11 of them starts, and scored 1 goal as El Decano finished 3rd in the table.

==== Loan to Independiente ====
Ahead of the 2017 Clausura season, Ferreira was loaned to Primera División club Independiente de Campo Grande. On 23 July he made his Independiente debut in a 4–0 loss to Sportivo Luqueño. Ferreira started the match, but was subbed off after 41 minutes. He scored his first goal for Independiente on 18 November to give El Inde a 1–0 win against Deportivo Capiatá. Independiente ended the Clausura season bottom of the table and tied with Rubio Ñu in the relegation table. Ferreira scored in the relegation playoff to help El Inde to a 3–1 win over Rubio Ñu to stay in the Primera División.

Ferreira remained on loan at Independiente for the 2018 Apertura. On 9 February he scored twice in a 4–0 win against Club Nacional, however the result was later changed by the APF to a 3–0 Nacional win due to El Inde fielding an ineligible player. Ferreira scored another brace on 24 February as Independiente defeated Sportivo Luqueño 4–1. On 29 March he scored twice in a 3–1 win over Club Libertad. Ferreira ended the Aperutra season with 13 goals and 6 assists in 19 appearances, helping El Inde finish 5th in the table. Ferreira finished as the 2nd highest scorer during the Apertura.

=== Monarcas Morelia ===
On 2 July 2018, Ferreira signed with Liga MX side Monarcas Morelia for a reported transfer fee of $2.5 million, with Olimpia retaining a 20% sell-on fee. He made his debut for Morelia on 24 July, scoring in a 2–0 win over Alebrijes de Oaxaca in a Copa MX Apertura match. Ferreira made 4 appearances in the Copa MX Apertura, scoring twice. On 3 August Ferreira made his Liga MX debut, coming off the bench and scoring a goal in a 2–2 draw with Veracruz. He made 13 appearances, scored 5 goals, and had 1 assist during the Liga MX Apertura, helping Morelia to a 9th place finish, 1 spot and 1 point out of the Liguilla. It was a disappointing 2019 Clausura for Ferreira and Morelia, with Ferreira scoring twice in 12 appearances as Morelia finished in 16th. In the Copa MX Clausura, Ferreira scored once in 5 appearances as Morelia reached the quarterfinals.

On 19 October 2019, after making just 3 appearances during the first 12 games of the Apertura, none of them starts, Ferreira was inserted into the starting lineup and responded by scoring a hat-trick to give Morelia a 3–2 win over Cruz Azul. He ended the Apertura regular season with 4 goals and 1 assist in 9 appearances as Morelia finished 7th. Ferreira played in all 3 of their Liguilla matches as Morelia reached the semifinals, where they drew 2–2 against Club América, with América advancing due to being the higher seed. Ferreira scored twice in 5 Copa MX matches, helping Morelia reach the round of 16. He made 1 appearance during the 2020 Clausura before being loaned to Libertad.

=== Club Libertad ===
On 29 January 2020, Ferreira signed on loan with Paraguayan Primera División side Club Libertad for the 2020 season with an option to buy. He made his debut for Gumarelo on 2 February in a 2–1 win over Nacional. On 7 February he scored his first goal for Libertad, converting a penalty kick in the 90+4th minute to give Gumarelo a 2–1 win over Club River Plate. Ferreira scored a hat-trick on 7 March as Libertad defeated General Díaz 5–1. Three days later he scored a brace to help Libertad beat Caracas 3–2 in a Copa Libertadores group stage match. On 13 August, Ferreira came off the bench and scored against his former team Olimpia in a 2–1 loss for Libertad. It was his 3rd consecutive game with a goal. He ended the 2020 Apertura with 20 appearances, 13 goals, and 4 assists, helping Libertad finish 3rd in the table. Ferreira finished the Apertura campaign as the division's top scorer. On 17 October, in the first match of the Clausura, Ferreira scored twice to help defeat Guaireña 3–0. On 19 December he scored to give Gumarelo a 2–1 win over Olimpia in the final match of the Clausura. In a shortened Clausura due to the COVID-19 pandemic, Ferreira finished with 4 goals and 2 assists in 8 appearances as Libertad finished 4th. In the playoffs, Libertad lost in the quarterfinals 3–1 to Club Guaraní. For the 2020 season as a whole, he finished with 29 appearances and 17 goals in league play, tied with former teammate Roque Santa Cruz as the Primera División top scorer. In the Copa Libertadores, Ferreira scored 3 goals and had 1 assist in 10 appearances as Libertad reached the quarterfinals.

On 1 January 2021, Libertad exercised the purchase option of the loan and paid a reported $4 million to Mazatlán F.C. (while Ferreira was on loan, Monarcas Morelia relocated to Mazatlán), with $800 thousand of the transfer fee going to Olimpia due to their sell-on fee. Ferreira scored his first goals of the 2021 season on 17 March, scoring twice in a 2–2 draw against Universidad Católica in a Copa Libertadoras match. He recorded his first goal of the Apertura on the final matchday, scoring once in a 3–1 win over Sportivo Luqueño. Although Ferreira finished the Apertrua with just 1 goal and 1 assist from 10 appearances, Libertad still managed to top the table by 5 points. Ferreira enjoyed a more productive Clausura season, scoring 9 goals and recording 1 assist in 16 appearances, helping Libertad finish 4th in the standings. His 9 goals tied him with Libertad teammate Lorenzo Melgarejo for the Clausura golden boot. He also made 4 appearances in the Copa Libertadores, scoring 2 goals. In the Copa Sudamericana, Ferreira scored twice in 10 appearances as Libertad reached the semifinals, where they lost to Red Bull Bragantino.

=== Houston Dynamo ===
On 18 January 2022, Ferreira signed with Major League Soccer club Houston Dynamo as a designated player. The official transfer fee was undisclosed, but it was reported to be $4.3 million. He made his Dynamo debut on 27 February, playing the full 90 minutes in a 0–0 draw against Real Salt Lake in Houston's opening match of the season. On 9 April, Ferreira scored his first and second goals for the Dynamo to help Houston to a 4–3 win over the San Jose Earthquakes. On 30 April, Ferreira scored a goal from the half-way line, chipping the ball over the goalkeeper in a 2–1 loss to Austin FC. The strike was named MLS Goal of the Week. On 22 May, Ferreira had a goal and 2 assists in a 3–0 win against the LA Galaxy, a performance that saw him named MLS Player of the Week. He scored 5 minutes into stoppage time on 20 August to rescue a 1–1 draw with the Colorado Rapids. On 2 October, he scored a brace to give the Dynamo a 2–1 win over Nashville SC. Ferreira ended his first season in Houston with 13 goals and 3 assists in 31 regular season appearances. Despite a solid debut season, the Dynamo struggled as a team and finished 13th in the Western Conference, missing out on the playoffs.

On 18 January 2025, Ferreira and Houston mutually agreed to terminate his contract.

=== Rosario Central ===
On 21 January 2025, Ferreira joined Argentine Primera División side Rosario Central.

=== Return to Olimpia ===
On 9 June 2025, following the termination of his contract with Rosario Central, Ferreira returned to the side with which he started his career, Club Olimpia.

== International career ==
Ferreira represented Paraguay at the youth level with the under-17, under-20, and under-23 teams.

On 29 March 2022, Ferreira earned his first cap for the senior national team, getting the start in a 2–0 loss to Peru in a World Cup qualifier.

== Career statistics ==
As of 21 February 2023

Appearances and goals by club, season and competition
| Club | Season | League | | | National cup (Note: Includes Copa Paraguay, Copa MX, and U.S. Open Cup) | | League cup (Note: Includes MLS Cup Playoffs) | | Continental | | Total | |
| Club | Season | Division | Apps | Goals | Apps | Goals | Apps | Goals | Apps | Goals | Apps | Goals |
|---|---|---|---|---|---|---|---|---|---|---|---|---|
| Club Olimpia | 2016 | Primera División | 1 | 0 | — | | — | | 1 (Note: Appearances in Copa Libertadores) | 0 | 2 | 0 |
| Club Olimpia | 2017 | Primera División | 14 | 1 | — | | — | | 1 | 0 | 15 | 1 |
| Club Olimpia | Total | | 15 | 1 | 0 | 0 | 0 | 0 | 2 | 0 | 17 | 1 |
| Independiente CG (loan) | 2017 | Primera División | 11 | 2 | — | | — | | — | | 11 | 2 |
| Independiente CG (loan) | 2018 | Primera División | 19 | 13 | 0 | 0 | — | | — | | 19 | 13 |
| Independiente CG (loan) | Total | | 30 | 15 | 0 | 0 | 0 | 0 | 0 | 0 | 30 | 15 |
| Monarcas Morelia | 2018–19 | Liga MX | 25 | 7 | 9 | 3 | — | | — | | 34 | 10 |
| Monarcas Morelia | 2019–20 | Liga MX | 13 | 4 | 5 | 2 | — | | — | | 18 | 6 |
| Monarcas Morelia | Total | | 38 | 11 | 14 | 5 | 0 | 0 | 0 | 0 | 52 | 16 |
| Club Libertad (loan) | 2020 | Primera División | 29 | 17 | — | | — | | 10 | 3 | 39 | 20 |
| Club Libertad | 2021 | Primera División | 25 | 10 | 5 | 4 | — | | 14 (Note: Four appearances and two goals in Copa Libertadores, ten appearances and two goals in Copa Sudamericana) | 4 | 44 | 18 |
| Club Libertad | Total | | 54 | 27 | 5 | 4 | 0 | 0 | 24 | 7 | 83 | 38 |
| Houston Dynamo | 2022 | MLS | 31 | 13 | 1 | 1 | — | | — | | 32 | 14 |
| Houston Dynamo | 2023 | MLS | 0 | 0 | 0 | 0 | 0 | 0 | 0 | 0 | 0 | 0 |
| Houston Dynamo | Total | | 31 | 13 | 1 | 1 | 0 | 0 | 0 | 0 | 32 | 14 |
| Career total | | | 168 | 67 | 20 | 10 | 0 | 0 | 26 | 7 | 214 | 84 |

== Honours ==
Libertad

- Primera División: 2021 Apertura

Individual

- Primera División Golden Boot: 2020 Apertura, 2021 Clausura

== Personal life ==
Ferreira has 3 older sisters. His favorite players are Ronaldo Nazário and Paraguayan legend Roque Santa Cruz, who was teammates with Ferreira at Olimpia.
