= Lucas Vera =

Argentine footballer

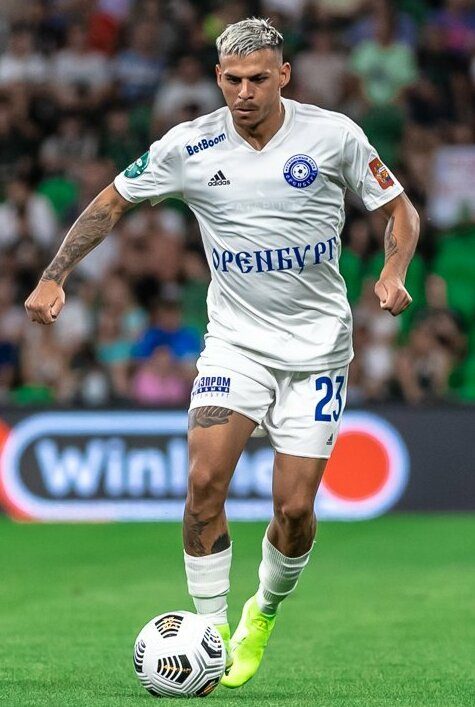
- Vera with Orenburg in 2022

Personal information
- Full name: Lucas Gabriel Vera
- Date of birth: 18 April 1997 (age 29)
- Place of birth: Bernal, Argentina
- Height: 1.64 m (5 ft 4 1/2 in)
- Position: Central midfielder

Team information
- Current team: Lokomotiv Moscow
- Number: 32

Youth career
- Lanús

Senior career*
Years	Team	Apps	(Gls)
2017–2022	Lanús	24	(0)
2018–2019	→ All Boys (loan)	33	(3)
2021–2022	→ Huracán (loan)	22	(0)
2022–2024	Orenburg	55	(3)
2024–2025	Khimki	30	(7)
2025	Al Wahda	0	(0)
2025–	Lokomotiv Moscow	10	(0)
- * Club domestic league appearances and goals as of 17 May 2026

Lucas Gabriel Vera (born 18 April 1997) is an Argentine professional footballer who plays as a central midfielder for Russian Premier League club Lokomotiv Moscow.

== Career ==
Vera started his career with Lanús. He was moved into the club's first-team in September 2017, with manager Jorge Almirón selecting him to start in a home defeat to Boca Juniors; he was substituted off on fifty-five minutes for Lautaro Acosta. He played a part in three further fixtures in the 2017–18 Argentine Primera División campaign. On 23 August 2018, a month after featuring in the Copa Sudamericana for Lanús versus Atlético Junior, Vera was loaned by Primera B Metropolitana club All Boys.

On 21 July 2022, Vera joined Russian Premier League club Orenburg. Orenburg's director of sports Dmitri Andreyev confirmed that the transfer was permanent, not a loan as it was reported.

On 11 July 2024, Vera moved to Khimki.

On 3 July 2025 Al Wahda announced their signing with the Argentine.

On 17 December 2025, Vera returned to Russia and signed a two-and-a-half-season contract with Lokomotiv Moscow.

== Personal life ==
Vera is the older brother of the footballer Matías Vera.

== Career statistics ==
As of match played 4 August 2026.

Appearances and goals by club, season and competition
Club	Season	League			Cup		Continental		Other		Total	
Club	Season	Division	Apps	Goals	Apps	Goals	Apps	Goals	Apps	Goals	Apps	Goals
Lanús	2017–18	Argentine Primera División	4	0	0	0	0	0	0	0	4	0
Lanús	2018–19	Argentine Primera División	0	0	0	0	1 (Note: Appearances in the Copa Sudamericana)	0	0	0	1	0
Lanús	2019–20	Argentine Primera División	20	0	4	1	5	0	9 (Note: Appearances in the Copa de la Liga Profesional)	1	38	2
Lanús	2021	Argentine Primera División	—		2	0	4	1	5	1	11	2
Lanús	Total		24	0	6	1	10	1	14	2	54	4
All Boys (loan)	2018–19	Primera B Metropolitana	33	3	1	0	—		—		34	3
Huracán (loan)	2021	Argentine Primera División	21	0	—		—		—		21	0
Huracán (loan)	2022	Argentine Primera División	1	0	1	0	—		5	0	7	0
Huracán (loan)	Total		22	0	1	0	0	0	5	0	28	0
Orenburg	2022–23	Russian Premier League	27	2	3	0	—		—		30	2
Orenburg	2023–24	Russian Premier League	28	1	2	0	—		—		30	1
Orenburg	Total		55	3	5	0	—		—		60	3
Khimki	2024–25	Russian Premier League	30	7	1	0	—		—		31	7
Al Wahda	2025–26	UAE Pro League	0	0	—		—		—		0	0
Lokomotiv Moscow	2025–26	Russian Premier League	10	0	1	0	—		—		11	0
Lokomotiv Moscow	2026–27	Russian Premier League	0	0	1	0	—		—		1	0
Lokomotiv Moscow	Total		10	0	2	0	0	0	0	0	12	0
Career total			174	13	16	1	10	1	19	2	219	17
