= Matías Vera (footballer, born 1995) =

Argentine footballer

Personal information
- Full name: Matías Fernando Vera
- Date of birth: 20 November 1995 (age 30)
- Place of birth: Bernal, Argentina
- Height: 1.74 m (5 ft 9 in)
- Position: Right-back

Team information
- Current team: Nueva Chicago

Youth career
- Lanús

Senior career*
Years	Team	Apps	(Gls)
2019–2023	Lanús	2	(0)
2019–2020	→ Barracas Central (loan)	0	(0)
2020	→ Gimnasia Mendoza (loan)	2	(0)
2021	→ Los Andes (loan)	21	(0)
2023–2024	Güemes	32	(0)
2024–2025	Chacarita Juniors	23	(0)
2025–2026	Arsenal Sarandí	25	(0)
2026–	Nueva Chicago	2	(0)
- * Club domestic league appearances and goals as of 17:10, 13 April 2026 (UTC)

Matías Fernando Vera (born 20 August 1995) is an Argentine professional footballer who plays as a right-back for Nueva Chicago.

== Professional career ==
A youth product of Lanús, Vera joined Barracas Central on loan in 2019 but returned to Lanús in an emergency when they lost their other rightbacks. He made his professional debut with Lanús in a 2-0 Argentine Primera División loss to Aldosivi on 24 January 2020.

At the end of August 2021, Vera joined Gimnasia Mendoza on loan. However, he didn't play much due to the COVID-19 pandemic. In February 2021, Vera was loaned out to Los Andes for the rest of the year.

== Personal life ==
Vera is the younger brother of the footballer Lucas Vera.
