= Marcelo Palomino =

American soccer player (born 2001)

Personal information
- Date of birth: May 21, 2001 (age 25)
- Place of birth: Houston, Texas, United States
- Height: 5 ft 6 in (1.68 m)
- Position: Attacking midfielder

Team information
- Current team: Orange County SC
- Number: 18

Youth career
- 2012–2019: Houston Dynamo

Senior career*
Years	Team	Apps	(Gls)
2017–2018	Brazos Valley Cavalry	7	(6)
2019–2022	Houston Dynamo	3	(0)
2021	→ Charlotte Independence (loan)	31	(6)
2022	Houston Dynamo 2	17	(7)
2023	AFC Eskilstuna	24	(5)
2024–2025	GIF Sundsvall	52	(7)
2026–	Orange County SC	21	(0)

International career
2016	United States U16	8	(2)
2017	United States U17	3	(1)
2018	United States U18	5	(0)
2019	United States U20	3	(0)
- * Club domestic league appearances and goals as of 13:56, 10 November 2026 (UTC)

Marcelo Palomino (born May 21, 2001) is an American professional soccer player who plays as an attacking midfielder for USL Championship side Orange County SC.

== Career ==
=== Youth ===
Palomino joined the Houston Dynamo academy when he was 11 years old. Whilst with the Dynamo academy, Palomino was named Dynamo Academy Player of the Year for three consecutive seasons between 2016 and 2018. He spent parts of the 2017 and 2018 seasons with Houston's Premier Development League affiliate side Brazos Valley Cavalry, scoring 7 goals in 8 appearances for the club, helping them to the PDL Mid-South Division title in 2018. He also spent time training with the Dynamo first team regularly in 2017 and 2018.

In 2019, after turning 18, Palomino turned down contract offers from the Dynamo to pursue an opportunity in Europe, going on trials with Portuguese club FC Porto, German club TSV 1860 Munich, and others.

=== Professional ===
==== Houston Dynamo ====
On January 6, 2019, Palomino signed with Major League Soccer side Houston Dynamo as a homegrown player. He made his professional debut on October 3, 2020, appearing as a 77th-minute substitute during a 2–1 loss to Sporting Kansas City. Palomino finished the 2020 season having made 3 appearances, all as a substitute, for the Dynamo.

On March 3, 2021, Palomino joined USL Championship club Charlotte Independence on loan for the 2021 season. He made his debut for Charlotte on May 1 in a 3–0 defeat against the Tampa Bay Rowdies. In the next game, on May 14, Palomino scored his first goal for the Independence against Charleston Battery, his 12th-minute goal being the first in a 3–0 victory. He ended the regular season with 6 goals and 1 assist in 31 appearances, helping Charlotte finish 2nd in the Atlantic Division and qualify for the playoffs. After not appearing in Charlotte's first playoff game, he came on as a late substitute in their 2nd, a 1–0 loss to Louisville City in the conference semifinals.

Palomino made 2 Open Cup appearances for the Dynamo in 2022, but primarily played for Houston Dynamo 2 in MLS Next Pro, where he scored 7 goals and had 2 assists in 18 appearances.

=== AFC Eskilstuna ===
On January 9, 2023, Palomino joined Swedish club AFC Eskilstuna on a permanent deal, signing a four-year contract.

=== GIF Sundsvall ===
On January 26, 2024, Palomino moved to another Superettan club GIF Sundsvall on a three-year deal.

== Career statistics ==
As of February 21, 2023

Club	Season	League			Cup (Note: Includes U.S. Open Cup and Svenska Cupen)		Playoffs		Continental		Total	
Club	Season	Division	Apps	Goals	Apps	Goals	Apps	Goals	Apps	Goals	Apps	Goals
Brazos Valley Cavalry	2017	PDL	3	2	—		—		—		3	2
Brazos Valley Cavalry	2018	PDL	4	4	—		1	1	—		5	5
Brazos Valley Cavalry	Total		7	6	0	0	1	1	0	0	8	7
Houston Dynamo	2020	Major League Soccer	3	0	—		—		—		3	0
Houston Dynamo	2022	Major League Soccer	0	0	2	0	—		—		2	0
Houston Dynamo	Total		3	0	2	0	0	0	0	0	5	0
Charlotte Independence (loan)	2021	USL Championship	31	6	—		1	0	—		32	6
Houston Dynamo 2	2022	MLS Next Pro	17	7	—		1	0	—		18	7
AFC Eskilstuna	2023	Superettan	0	0	0	0	—		—		0	0
Career Total			58	19	2	0	3	1	0	0	63	20
