= Memo Rodríguez =

American soccer player (born 1995)

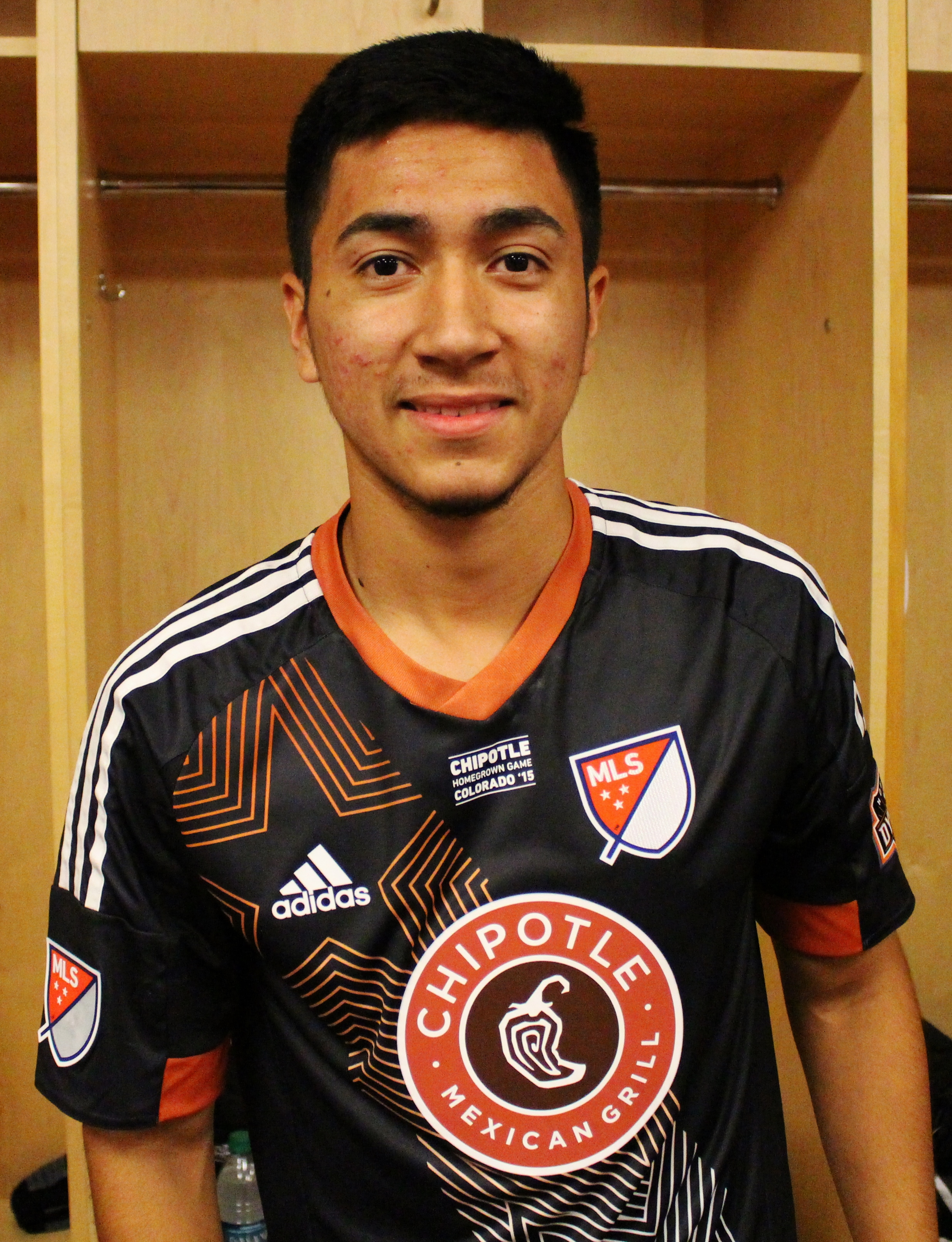
- Rodríguez in 2015

Personal information
- Full name: José Guillermo Rodríguez
- Date of birth: December 27, 1995 (age 30)
- Place of birth: Wharton, Texas, United States
- Height: 5 ft 8 in (1.73 m)
- Position: Midfielder

Team information
- Current team: Sacramento Republic
- Number: 8

Youth career
- –2011: Houstonians FC
- 2011–2014: Houston Dynamo

Senior career*
Years	Team	Apps	(Gls)
2015	Houston Dynamo	0	(0)
2015	→ Charleston Battery (loan)	17	(1)
2016	Rio Grande Valley FC	30	(6)
2017–2022	Houston Dynamo	136	(17)
2017–2019	→ Rio Grande Valley FC (loan)	6	(4)
2023	LA Galaxy	12	(1)
2023	Austin FC	9	(0)
2024–2025	Sporting Kansas City	45	(2)
2026–	Sacramento Republic	23	(7)
- * Club domestic league appearances and goals as of November 11, 2026

José Guillermo "Memo" Rodríguez (born December 27, 1995) is an American professional soccer player who plays as a midfielder for USL Championship club Sacramento Republic FC.

== Early life ==
Rodriguez began his youth career with Houstonians FC, a youth soccer team in Houston, Texas. He joined the Houston Dynamo academy in 2011 at the age of 15. Rodriguez played in 83 US Soccer Development Academy games while with the Dynamo academy, scoring 18 goals. He was named as the Dynamo Academy Players' Player of the Year in both 2012 and 2013. Rodriguez also trained with the Dynamo first teams for spells during the 2013 and 2014 seasons.

== Club career ==
=== Houston Dynamo ===
==== Loan to Charleston Battery ====
On December 4, 2014, Rodríguez signed a homegrown contract with the Houston Dynamo, making him the sixth homegrown signing in club history. On March 20, 2015, it was announced that Rodríguez had been sent on loan to the Dynamo's USL affiliate club Charleston Battery. He made his professional debut the following day in a 3–2 victory over Toronto FC II. Rodriguez scored his first professional goal in a 1–1 draw with New York Red Bulls II on April 18. He finished the regular season with 17 appearances, 6 of them starts, plus a goal and an assist as Charleston finished 3rd in the Eastern Conference. Rodriguez did not make an appearance in the playoffs.

=== Rio Grande Valley FC ===
Ahead of the 2016 season Rodriguez was released by the Dynamo and signed a contract with USL club Rio Grande Valley FC Toros, who had replaced the Battery as the Dynamo's USL affiliate club that offseason. He made his Toros debut on March 26 in a 2–0 defeat to the Tulsa Roughnecks. Rodriguez would score his first goal for RGVFC on May 21, finding the back of the net twice in a 4–0 win over Swope Park Rangers. He enjoyed a successful season with the Toros and head coach Wilmer Cabrera, as Rodriguez scored 6 and recorded 7 assists in 30 games to help the Toros make the USL Playoffs. In the Toros' first round playoff game, Rodriguez had an assist in a 3–2 loss to OKC Energy.

=== Return to Houston ===
On March 1, 2017, Rodriguez re-signed with the Dynamo and reconnected with Wilmer Cabrera, who had taken over as coach for the Dynamo during the off-season. On April 8, 2017, Rodriguez came on as a sub in a 2–0 win over the New England Revolution to make his MLS debut. He scored his first goal for the Dynamo on June 14 in the U.S. Open Cup vs North Carolina FC, scoring in extra time to give Houston a 3–2 win. On July 5 Rodriguez scored his first MLS goal in a 3–1 win over the Montreal Impact. He finished the regular season with 9 appearances, 2 goals, and 1 assist as he helped his hometown team make it back to the MLS playoffs for the first time since 2013. However, Rodriguez would not see the field in the playoffs. He scored 3 goals in 4 games on loan with the Toros throughout the season.

Opportunities would be limited with the Dynamo for the start of 2018. After getting one appearance and 12 minutes total through the first six games, Memo was sent to RGVFC for a game, where he promptly scored. Rodriguez scored his first goal for the Dynamo of the season on May 5. Memo headed in a rebound in the 90th minute to give the Dynamo a 3–2 win over the LA Galaxy. Rodriguez scored a brace in a 5–0 win over NTX Rayados in the US Open Cup on June 7. The Dynamo went on to win the Open Cup, the first in club history, with Rodriguez playing in every game and getting 3 goals and an assist. However they failed to qualify for the MLS Playoffs, with Rodriguez ending the regular season with 1 goal in 19 appearances.

Rodriguez made his CONCACAF Champions League Debut on March 5, 2019, when he came on as a sub in a loss against Tigres UANL. In the Dynamo's next match, Memo got the start against Montreal and scored on a shot from 22 yards out, helping Houston to a 2–1 win. His strike was named MLS Goal of the Week. During Houston's next to league matches, Rodriguez followed that up with a brace, including the game-winning goal, in a 3–2 win against the Vancouver Whitecaps and then with a goal against the Colorado Rapids in a 4–1 Dynamo win. He picked up his first assist of the season on May 4 in a 2–1 win over Texas Derby rival FC Dallas. On May 18, Rodriguez would score to help the Dynamo secure a 2–1 win over D.C. United. After appearing in a 1–1 draw with Sporting Kansas City on June 1, he missed around 2 months due to a hamstring injury. Rodriguez made a rehab appearance with RGVFC on July 13 before returning to the Dynamo lineup on July 20, picking up an assist in a 3–1 win over Toronto FC. Houston had 1 win and 6 losses during the 7 MLS games while Rodriguez was out injured. His return to the lineup was unable to save the season as the Dynamo missed out on the playoffs despite the best start in club history. Rodriguez was named as the Dynamo Young Player of the Year for his strong season, scoring 7 and assisting 5 in 26 MLS appearances.

In 2020, new Dynamo head coach Tab Ramos converted Rodriguez to a central midfielder. He had played there occasionally before, but Ramos's predecessor Wilmer Cabrera preferred to play Rodriguez as a winger. Rodriguez and the Dynamo opened the 2020 season on February 29 with a 1–1 draw against the LA Galaxy. After matchweek 2, the season was paused due to the COVID-19 pandemic, with play resuming again in July. In Houston's first game back, Rodriguez scored twice in a 3–3 draw with LAFC on July 13, a performance that saw him named to the MLS Team of the Week. In the 4 games between August 25 and September 9, Rodriguez had 3 assists, with Houston recording 3 wins and 1 draw in that stretch. On September 12 he scored once in a 2–1 loss to FC Dallas. On October 18 and 24, Rodriguez scored in draws against the Columbus Crew and Minnesota United. Rodriguez ended the shortened season with 5 goals and 3 assists from 21 appearances. Despite another good season from Rodriguez, it was a poor season for the Dynamo as a team, finishing the year bottom of the Western Conference and failing to qualify for the playoffs for the 3rd straight season. In October, Rodriguez was rewarded for his strong performances with a contract extension until 2022, with team options for 2023 and 2024.

On April 16, 2021, in the opening match of the season, Rodriguez scored once to help the Dynamo defeat the San Jose Earthquakes 2–1. He was named to the MLS Team of the Week as a result. Rodriguez made the Team of the Week again following his goal and assist in a 2–1 Dynamo win over the Vancouver Whitecaps on May 22. Rodriguez finished the 2021 season with 2 goals and 2 assists from 31 appearances as Houston finished last in the West for the second straight season and missed the playoffs for the 4th consecutive year.

Rodriguez made his first appearance of the 2022 season on February 27, getting the start in a 0–0 draw vs Real Salt Lake in matchweek 1. He picked up his first assist of the season on March 19, setting up Tyler Pasher in the 90th minute to draw 1–1 with the Colorado Rapids. Rodriguez ended the 2022 regular season with 30 appearances (18 starts) and 3 assists as the Dynamo failed to qualify for the playoffs for the 5th straight season. He also made 3 appearances during the 2022 Open Cup. Following the season the Dynamo declined the option on Rodriguez's contract.

=== LA Galaxy ===
On January 5, 2023, Rodríguez signed with LA Galaxy as a free agent on a one-year deal with club options for 2024 and 2025.

=== Austin FC ===
On August 1, 2023, Rodríguez was traded from LA Galaxy to Austin FC for Diego Fagúndez. Rodríguez was signed through the 2023 season with club options for the 2024 and 2025 season. On November 17, 2023, Austin FC announced they would not exercise the 2024 option for Rodríguez.

=== Sacramento Republic FC ===
On February 21, 2026 Rodríguez signed with Sacramento Republic FC for the 2026 USL Championship season.

== Personal life ==
Rodriguez is of Mexican descent, with his mother, Velia, being from Zacatecas, Mexico His father, Guillermo Sr., died in a car accident before Rodriguez was born. Rodriguez grew up in El Campo, Texas, with his mother, stepfather, and 3 younger brothers. His mom would drive him over an hour each way for 12 years so he could play club soccer at a more competitive level in Houston. He is eligible to represent both the United States and Mexico at the international level and has expressed a willingness to play for either nation.

== Career statistics ==
=== Club ===
As of October 21, 2023

Club Performance			League		National cup		Playoffs		Continental		Total	
Club	Season	League	Apps	Goals	Apps	Goals	Apps	Goals	Apps	Goals	Apps	Goals
Houston Dynamo	2015	Major League Soccer	0	0	0	0	—		—		0	0
Charleston Battery (loan)	2015	United Soccer League	17	1	0	0	0	0	—		17	1
Rio Grande Valley FC	2016	United Soccer League	30	6	—		1	0	—		31	6
Houston Dynamo	2017	Major League Soccer	9	2	2	1	0	0	—		11	3
Houston Dynamo	2018	Major League Soccer	19	1	5	3	—		—		24	4
Houston Dynamo	2019	Major League Soccer	26	7	0	0	—		2 (Note: One appearance in CONCACAF Champions League, one appearance in Leagues Cup)	0	28	7
Houston Dynamo	2020	Major League Soccer	21	5	—		—		—		21	5
Houston Dynamo	2021	Major League Soccer	31	2	—		—		—		31	2
Houston Dynamo	2022	Major League Soccer	30	0	3	0	—		—		33	0
Houston Dynamo	Total		136	17	10	4	0	0	2	0	148	21
Rio Grande Valley FC (loan)	2017	United Soccer League	4	3	—		—		—		4	3
Rio Grande Valley FC (loan)	2018	United Soccer League	1	1	—		—		—		1	1
Rio Grande Valley FC (loan)	2019	USL Championship	1	0	—		—		—		1	0
Rio Grande Valley FC (loan)	Total		6	4	—		—		—		6	4
LA Galaxy	2023	Major League Soccer	12	1	2	2	—		2 (Note: Appearances in Leagues Cup)	0	16	3
Austin FC	2023	Major League Soccer	9	0	—		0	0	—		9	0
Career Totals			210	29	12	6	1	0	4	0	227	35

== Honors ==
Houston Dynamo

- U.S. Open Cup: 2018

Individual

- Dynamo Young Player of the Year: 2019
