= Allocation money =

Funds granted to sports teams above a salary cap

In Major League Soccer (MLS) and the National Women's Soccer League (NWSL), two of the top-tier professional soccer leagues in the United States, allocation money represents an amount of money that teams can use to sign players or allocate to their salaries in order to remain compliant with the leagues' salary caps.

== Major League Soccer ==
=== Reasons for obtaining ===
MLS teams receive general allocation money for these reasons:

- End-of-season allocation of $200,000 for each team that does not make the post season (CBA section 10.17 & roster rules)
- Expansion year allocation of $1.1 million for each expansion team (CBA section 10.18a)
- Expansion year allocation of $100,000 for each existing team (CBA section 10.18b)
- Annual allocation of $200,000 for each team (CBA section 10.19a)
- Qualification for the CONCACAF Champions League allocation of $140,000 for each qualified team (roster rules)
- Transfer or loan of player to another club outside of MLS allocation of up to $750,000 for each transfer or loan (CBA section 10.19e & roster rules)
- Third Designated Player charge distribution (CBA section 10.19f)
- Free agency compensation of $50,000 per net player loss (CBA section 29.7b)
- Expansion Draft compensation of $50,000 for each player selected

MLS teams receive targeted allocation money for these reasons:

- Annual allocation of $100,000 for each team (CBA section 10.19b)
- December 2016 announcement of $1.2 million of additional targeted allocation money for each team
- Teams may also pull forward and use immediately the $100,000 of targeted allocation money and $1.2 million of additional targeted allocation money designated for 2019
- December 2017 announcement of up to $2.8 million of team-funded targeted allocation money for each team

All numbers are for 2018 season.

=== Uses ===
General allocation money can be used in several ways:

- Reduce the amount that a non-Designated Player costs against the salary cap down to the league minimum salary ($67,500 in 2018).
- Reduce the amount that a Designated Player costs against the salary cap down to $150,000.
- Sign players new to MLS.
- Re-sign an existing MLS player.
- Off-set acquisition cost (loan and transfer fees).
- In connection with the extension of a player's contract for the second year provided the player was new to MLS in the immediately prior year.
- Trade it to another team.

General allocation money must be used within 30 days of the close of the third full MLS transfer window after it was acquired. If a quantity of general allocation money is not used within that timeframe, it is halved by the league. That halved amount is then available for use during the next two transfer windows. If it is still not used after those transfer windows, the quantity is no longer available for use.

Targeted allocation money can be used in several ways:

- Sign new or re-sign existing players whose salary and acquisition costs are more than the maximum salary budget charge ($504,375 in 2018) up to $1.5 million.
- Convert a Designated Player to a non-Designated Player by buying down his salary budget charge to below the maximum salary budget charge provided the club then signs a new Designated Player at an investment equal to or greater than the player he is replacing.
- Sign new homegrown players to their first MLS contract using up to $200,000 of targeted allocation money.
- Trade league-funded targeted allocation money to another team.

Targeted allocation money must be applied, if not necessarily used, within four MLS transfer windows of its acquisition. In this case, "applied" does not mean a team actually has to use the amount within four windows. Rather, they merely have to notify the league of how they plan on using their expiring targeted allocation money – allocating a specific amount to a specific player – in the following window by the end of the fourth window after it was acquired. If they do not do that, that amount expires.

Targeted allocation money and general allocation money may not be used in combination when signing or re-signing a player. Either targeted allocation money or general allocation money may be used on a player in a single season, not both.

Amounts of allocation money held by each team are not disclosed to the general public. Only in the case of a trade will the amount of allocation money involved be made public.

Twice in league history, an allocation received for a lost player was used on the same player upon his return to the league: by the Chicago Fire on Ante Razov and by the New England Revolution on Daniel Hernandez.

=== Other allocations ===
Allocation money is not to be confused with the MLS Allocation Order, which is a ranking used to determine which MLS club has first priority to acquire a player who is in MLS allocation list. MLS allocation list contains select U.S. National Team players and players transferred outside of MLS garnering transfer fee of at least $500,000. Along with Allocation Money, Allocation Order rankings can be traded, provided that part of the compensation received in return is another club's Allocation ranking.

=== See also ===
- 1996 MLS Inaugural Allocations
- Designated Player Rule

== National Women's Soccer League ==
Following the 2019 season, the NWSL introduced its own form of allocation money to allow teams a limited ability to exceed the league's team and player salary caps. The new system was notably similar to the general allocation money deployed by MLS.

=== Reasons for obtaining ===
The NWSL sets a base limit of allocation money for teams each season. Teams must pay the league to use their allowance of allocation money in transactions, and allocation money that a team purchased but did not use in one season is carried over to the following season.

The league can also award allocation money as compensation for certain losses. For example, the 2022 NWSL Expansion Draft, San Diego Wave FC and Angel City FC each received $150,000 in funded allocation money, but if those teams selected an unprotected federation player from another team, they would have to compensate that team from this fund. The league also grants teams that fail to qualify for the NWSL playoffs the option to purchase $100,000 in additional allocation money during the following calendar year.

=== Uses ===
Teams could initially spend allocation money on player salaries that exceeded the individual player maximum limit, for bonuses to players winning awards, as compensation for players with at least three national team appearances in the last two years or at least five seasons played in the league, or toward certain team expenses such as transfer and loan fees to acquire players from other leagues. Teams could not use allocation money to compensate NWSL federation players who were paid by the United States or Canadian national federations, but could use it to compensate formerly allocated players.

Washington Spirit forward Trinity Rodman signed the largest NWSL contract facilitated by allocation money in February 2022, for a four-year deal worth more than $1.1 million, at $281,000 base salary per season. The league's individual player salary cap in 2022 was $75,000, requiring more than $200,000 of Rodman's salary per season to be paid with allocation money.

In 2023, the league expanded the use of allocation money to reduce the salary cap burden of a player's total compensation, including bonuses, fees, and benefits.

=== Limits ===
Teams could initially purchase up to $300,000 in allocation money. As of 2023, the league's allocation money limit was $600,000.

Teams can also trade for allocation money with other teams above and beyond their base limits. The first such trade was made between Chicago Red Stars and Utah Royals FC in 2020, in which Chicago traded the eighth overall pick in the 2020 NWSL College Draft in exchange for $60,000 of allocation money.

National Women's Soccer League allocation money base limits by year
Year	Limit	Ref.
2020	$300,000	
2021	$400,000	
2022	$500,000	
2023	$600,000	

=== Cessation ===
In January 2024, the league announced that the system of allocation money would be phased out in favor of a salary cap increase, intraleague transfer funds, and a net transfer fee threshold. Allocation money would no longer be purchasable or tradeable as a result. This preceded broader changes to league roster rules announced in August during the 2024 season as part of a renegotiated collective bargaining agreement, including the elimination of drafts and discovery systems for player entry and league expansion, increased minimum salaries, and the extension of free agency to all players.
