= 2019 Tulsa Roughnecks FC season =

Tulsa Roughnecks FC
2019 season
- Head coach: Michael Nsien
- Stadium: ONEOK Field; Tulsa, Oklahoma
- USL: Conference: 16th
- USL Cup: Did not qualify
- 2019 U.S. Open Cup: Second Round
- Highest home attendance: 3,620 (April 27 vs. OKC)
- Lowest home attendance: 1,215 (Sept. 25 vs. San Antonio)
- Average home league attendance: 2,052
- Biggest win: 4–0 (March 23 v. Tacoma)
- Biggest defeat: 0–6 (June 22 v. Sacramento)

The 2019 Tulsa Roughnecks FC season was the 5th season for Tulsa Roughnecks FC in the USL Championship, the second-tier professional soccer league in the United States and Canada.

This proved to be the team's last season under the Roughnecks FC name. On December 4, 2019, the club name officially changed to FC Tulsa.

== Club ==
As of June 14, 2019

No.	Position	Nation	Player
1	GK	USA	Sean Lewis
3	DF	BRA	Renan Ferreira
4	DF	CMR	Cyprian Hedrick
5	DF	CAN	Frantzly Zephirin
6	MF	CAN	Jeff Addai
7	MF	USA	Calvin Rezende
8	MF	COL	Manny González
9	FW	NGR	Toby Uzo
10	MF	JAM	Akeil Barrett
11	MF	HON	Christian Altamirano
12	DF	BRA	Luca Lobo
13	DF	USA	Matthew Sheldon
14	FW	USA	Akwafei Ajeakwa
15	DF	CAN	Mallan Roberts
16	MF	BRA	Rodrigo da Costa
17	MF	HAI	Fredlin Mompremier
18	DF	USA	Anthony Legendre
20	DF	USA	Matt Rogers
21	FW	GHA	Panin Boakye
22	GK	CAN	Andrew MacRae
23	MF	USA	D.J. Dean
24	DF	USA	Colton Haskin
28	MF	HON	Brayan Reyes
30	DF	FIJ	Nicholas Prasad
33	GK	USA	Mason Stajduhar (on loan from Orlando City SC)
42	DF	TOG	Walid Yacoubou
99	FW	POR	Janú Silva

== Competitions ==
=== Exhibitions ===
February 2 Preseason	Oklahoma Wesleyan Eagles	1–2	Tulsa Roughnecks	Bartlesville, Oklahoma
3:00 P.M.	Goal	Report	Barrett; Silva	Stadium: Oklahoma Wesleyan University

February 11 Preseason	Tulsa Roughnecks	2–0	Oral Roberts Golden Eagles	Tulsa, Oklahoma
6:00 P.M.	Rodrigo; Lobo	Report		Stadium: Titan Sports & Performance Center
Note: Rescheduled from February 7 due to inclement weather

February 16 Preseason	Tulsa Roughnecks	2–1	Swope Park Rangers	Tulsa, Oklahoma
1:00 P.M.	Altamirano 45' (pen.); Bastidas	TUL Report; SPR Report	Colombie (yellow card) 2'; N'Diaye; Sanchez Gil (yellow card) 60'; K. Rad 85'	Stadium: Titan Sports & Performance Center

February 23 Preseason	Saint Louis FC	3–1	Tulsa Roughnecks	Fenton, Missouri
	Rivas 33' (pen.); Reynolds 49'; Trialist 56'	Report	Rodrigo 23'	Stadium: Toyota Stadium

February 26 Preseason	Rogers State Hillcats	1–4	Tulsa Roughnecks	Claremore, Oklahoma
	89'	Report	Altamirano 18'; Lobo 44'; Roberts (yellow card) 70'; Silva 83'; Barrett 90'	Stadium: Soldier Field

March 2 Preseason	Tulsa Golden Hurricane	0–1	Tulsa Roughnecks	Tulsa, Oklahoma
		Report	Rodrigo	Stadium: Hurricane Soccer & Track Stadium

=== USL Championship ===
==== Standings ====
Pos	Team	Pld	W	D	L	GF	GA	GD	Pts
14	Portland Timbers 2	34	10	8	16	65	71	−6	38
15	OKC Energy FC	34	9	11	14	45	58	−13	38
16	Tulsa Roughnecks	34	8	10	16	45	69	−24	34
17	Tacoma Defiance	34	8	7	19	42	82	−40	31
18	Colorado Springs Switchbacks	34	7	6	21	31	65	−34	27

Source: USL Championship Standings
Rules for classification: 1) total wins; 2) total goal differential; 3) total goals scored; 4) points earned against top four Conference finishers; 5) disciplinary points; 6) coin toss or drawing of lots

==== Match results ====
The 2019 USL Championship season schedule for the club was announced on December 19, 2018.

Win Draw Loss Upcoming fixture

Unless otherwise noted, all times in CDT

March 9 1	Tulsa Roughnecks	1–1	Portland Timbers 2	Tulsa, Oklahoma
7:00 P.M.	Altamirano 12'; Gonzalez (yellow card) 57'; Sheldon (yellow card) 71'; Hedrick (yellow card) 90+1'	Report	Jadama 55'; Hanson (yellow card) 84'	Stadium: ONEOK Field; Attendance: 3,122; Referee: Jose Lara

March 16 2	Orange County SC	3–5	Tulsa Roughnecks	Irvine, California
9:00 PM CDT	Alston 13'; Quinn 45+1' (pen.); Hume (yellow card) 45+3'; Arellano (yellow card) 71'; Ramos-Godoy 90+3'	Report	da Costa (yellow card) 29'; Altamirano (yellow card) 35', (goal) 45+4' (pen.); Silva 54'; Lobo 74', 78'; Bastidas 80'	Stadium: Championship Soccer Stadium; Attendance: 3,023; Referee: Alejandro Aguilera, Jr.

March 20 3	New Mexico United	2–1	Tulsa Roughnecks	Albuquerque, New Mexico
8:00 PM CDT	Sandoval 7'; Moar 20'; Padilla (yellow card) 33'; Mizell (yellow card) 84'; Muhammad (yellow card) 90+4'	Report	Hedrick (yellow card) 15'; Lobo 60'; Bastidas (yellow card) 83'	Stadium: Isotopes Park; Attendance: 8,330; Referee: Kevin Broadley

March 23 4	Tulsa Roughnecks	4–0	Tacoma Defiance	Tulsa, Oklahoma
3:00 PM CDT	Hedrick 8'; Altamirano 20'; Lobo 44', 57'	Report	Rydstrand (yellow card) 23'	Stadium: ONEOK Field; Attendance: 2,489; Referee: Thomas Snyder

March 29 5	Tulsa Roughnecks	2–1	Rio Grande Valley FC Toros	Tulsa, Oklahoma
7:00 P.M.	da Costa 19' (pen.); Bastidas 45+1', (yellow card) 70'; Legendre (yellow card) 56'	Report	Hernandez (yellow card) 57'; Lemoine 72'	Stadium: ONEOK Field; Attendance: 2,430; Referee: Calin Radosav

April 6 6	LA Galaxy II	4–2	Tulsa Roughnecks	Carson, California
19:00	Zubak 13' (pen.), 61'; Gallagher (yellow card) 22'; Vera (yellow card) 34'; Koreniuk 46', 49'	Report	Bastidas (yellow card) 24'; Lobo 59', 70'; Reyes (yellow card) 82'	Stadium: Dignity Health Sports Park; Attendance: 717; Referee: Mark Allatin

April 13 7	Fresno FC	3–1	Tulsa Roughnecks	Fresno, California
9:30 PM	Alihodžić (yellow card) 31'; Johnson 33', 59'; Chavez 55', (yellow card) 72'	Report	Silva 39' da Costa (yellow card) 45+4'; Mompremier (yellow card) 65'; Bastidas (yellow card) 69'	Stadium: Chukchansi Park; Attendance: 4,348; Referee: Nicholas Marin

April 24 8	Tulsa Roughnecks	2–0	Colorado Springs Switchbacks FC	Tulsa, Oklahoma
7:00 PM	da Costa 68', (yellow card) 78', (goal) 90+1'; Lobo (yellow card) 80'; Silva (yellow card) 84'	Preview	Argueta (yellow card) 70'	Stadium: ONEOK Field; Attendance: 1,948; Referee: Elton Garcia

April 27 9	Tulsa Roughnecks	1–1	OKC Energy FC	Tulsa, Oklahoma
7:00 PM CDT	Silva 4'; Roberts (yellow card) 31'; Addai (yellow card) 41'; Hedrick (yellow card) 84'; Ajeakwa (yellow card) 90'	Report	Gordon 32'; García (yellow card) 79'	Stadium: Oneok Field; Attendance: 3,620; Referee: Eric Tattersall

May 4 10	Reno 1868 FC	2–2	Tulsa Roughnecks	Reno, Nevada
9:00 PM	Hertzog 29', 45+1'; Seymore (yellow card) 86'	Report	Silva 37'; Gonzalez (yellow card) 55' da Costa 60'	Stadium: Greater Nevada Field; Attendance: 4,760; Referee: Ismir Pekmic

May 18 11	San Antonio FC	1–1	Tulsa Roughnecks	San Antonio, Texas
7:30 PM CDT	Gómez 5'; Barmby (yellow card) 23'	Report	Cardone 12' (o.g.); Addai (yellow card) 45'; Roberts (yellow card) 50'; Hedrick (yellow card) 71' da Costa (yellow card) 90+3'	Stadium: Toyota Field; Attendance: 5,704; Referee: Matthew Franz

May 25 12	Las Vegas Lights FC	0–0	Tulsa Roughnecks	Las Vegas, Nevada
8:30 PM	Garcia-Lopez (yellow card) 10'; Sandoval (yellow card) 55'; Hernández (yellow card) 85'	Report	Mompremier (yellow card) 67'	Stadium: Cashman Field; Attendance: 6,123; Referee: Kevin Stott

June 1 13	Tulsa Roughnecks	2–3	Austin Bold FC	Tulsa, Oklahoma
7:00 PM	Hedrick (yellow card) 5'; Altamirano 17'; Silva 48'	Report	Guadarrama (yellow card) 60'; Tyrpak 61', 69', 90+2'; Okugo (yellow card) 66'	Stadium: Oneok Field; Attendance: 2,187; Referee: Luis Guardia

June 7 14	Phoenix Rising FC	5–0	Tulsa Roughnecks	Scottsdale, Arizona
9:30pm	Jahn 13'; Flemmings 25', 65'; Asante 41' (pen.); Wheeler-Omiunu 71'	Report	Roberts (yellow card) 40'	Stadium: Casino Arizona Field; Attendance: 6,708; Referee: Elijio Arreguin

June 15 15	Tulsa Roughnecks	0–2	El Paso Locomotive FC	Tulsa, Oklahoma
7:30 PM	Rogers (yellow card) 26'; Mompremier (yellow card) 87'	Preview	Contreras 37'; Kiffe (yellow card) 43'; Kiesewetter 75' (pen.); Salgado (yellow card) 88'	Stadium: ONEOK Field; Attendance: 2,314; Referee: Jon Freemon

June 22 16	Sacramento Republic FC	6–0	Tulsa Roughnecks	Sacramento, California
8:00 PM	Taintor 8', (yellow card) 34'; Iwasa 44', 70'; Bonomo 48', 74'; Werner 80'; Alemán (yellow card) 90'	Report	Roberts (yellow card) 50'	Stadium: Papa Murphy's Park; Attendance: 9,522; Referee: Alejandro Aguilera, Jr.

June 29 17	Tulsa Roughnecks	1–3	Real Monarchs	Tulsa, Oklahoma
7:30 PM	da Costa 7'; Reyes (yellow card) 36'	Report	Kacher 17', (yellow card) 39'; Plewa 21'; Martinez 50'; Heard (yellow card) 63'; Mulholland (yellow card) 83'	Stadium: ONEOK Field; Attendance: 1,640; Referee: Matthew Corrigan

July 6 18	Portland Timbers 2	1–1	Tulsa Roughnecks	Portland, Oregon
7:30 PM	Wharton 90+8' (pen.)	Report	Rogers (yellow card) 2' da Costa 14'; Silva (yellow card) 26'; Rezende (yellow card) 70'; Reyes (yellow card) 85' (yellow-red card) 90+1'; Mompremier (red card) 90+6'	Stadium: Providence Park; Attendance: 1,986; Referee: Marco Vega

July 13 19	Colorado Springs Switchbacks FC	1–0	Tulsa Roughnecks	Colorado Springs, Colorado
7:00 PM	Malcolm 61'	Report	Hedrick (yellow card) 60'; Roberts (yellow card) 63'	Stadium: Weidner Field; Attendance: 4,034; Referee: Ismir Pekmic

July 24 20	Tulsa Roughnecks	1–3	LA Galaxy II	Tulsa, Oklahoma
17:30	Rodrigo 3'; Rogers (red card) 69'	Report	Shultz 27'; Williams 54'; Cuevas (yellow card) 66'; Vera (yellow card) 68'; Hernandez 75'; Lopez (yellow card) 85'	Stadium: Oneok Field; Attendance: 1,857; Referee: Kevin Broadley

July 27 21	Tulsa Roughnecks	0–1	Phoenix Rising FC	Tulsa, Oklahoma
7:30 PM	Mompremier (red card) 45'; Altamirano (yellow card) 59' da Costa (yellow card) 67'; Roberts (yellow card) 86'; Ajeakwa (yellow card) 87'	Report; Report	Dumbuya (yellow card) 17'; Musa (yellow card) 34'; Farrell (yellow card) 41'; Aguinaga (yellow card) 44'; Lambert 69'	Stadium: ONEOK Field; Attendance: 2,529; Referee: Eric Tattersall

August 3 22	OKC Energy FC	1–1	Tulsa Roughnecks	Oklahoma City, Oklahoma
8:00 PM CDT	Eissele 17'; Watson (yellow card) 33' (yellow-red card) 63'; Eissele (yellow card) 74'	Report	da Costa 23'; Hedrick (yellow card) 33'; Rezende (yellow card) 38'	Stadium: Taft Stadium; Attendance: 5,013; Referee: Alejandro Aguilera Jr

August 10 23	Real Monarchs	4–1	Tulsa Roughnecks	Herriman, Utah
9:00 PM	German 17'; Blake 56'; Jasso (yellow card) 58'; Mulholland (yellow card) 68'; Ryden 77'; Chang 90'	Report	Uzo 90+1'	Stadium: Zions Bank Stadium; Attendance: 2,221; Referee: Elvis Osmanovic

August 17 24	Austin Bold FC	5–1	Tulsa Roughnecks	Austin, Texas
8:00 PM	Twumasi 2'; Lima 10'; Kléber 25' (pen.), (yellow card) 30', (goal) 41' (pen.); Guadarrama 83' (pen.)	Report	Ajeakwa (yellow card) 9'; Hedrick (yellow card) 24'; Altamirano 43' (pen.); Stajduhar (yellow card) 83'; Reyes (yellow card) 90+1'	Stadium: Austin Bold Stadium; Attendance: 1,971; Referee: Farhad Dadkho

August 28 25	Tulsa Roughnecks	1–1	Las Vegas Lights FC	Tulsa, Oklahoma
8:00 PM CDT	Mompremier (yellow card) 33'; Uzo 70'	Report	Gonzalez (yellow card) 34'; Martínez (yellow card) 39'; Torre 62'; Sousa (yellow card) 67'	Stadium: ONEOK Field; Attendance: 1,503; Referee: Thomas Snyder

August 31 26	Tulsa Roughnecks	2–1	Fresno FC	Tulsa, Oklahoma
7:30 PM CDT	da Costa 5'; Marlon 46'; Lewis (yellow card) 90+3'	Report	Chavez 28', (yellow card) 72'; Martin (yellow card) 73'; Kurimoto (yellow card) 86'	Stadium: ONEOK Field; Attendance: 1,516; Referee: Jonathan Bilinski

September 4 27	El Paso Locomotive FC	2–2	Tulsa Roughnecks	El Paso, Texas
8:00 PM	Herrera (yellow card) 24'; Rebellón (yellow card) 65'; Kiesewetter (yellow card) 73', (goal) 81'; Gómez 80'	Report	Marlon 41'; Altamirano 56'; Reyes (yellow card) 72'; Uzo (yellow card) 72'	Stadium: Southwest University Park; Attendance: 5,519; Referee: Matthew Thompson

September 7 28	Rio Grande Valley FC Toros	0–1	Tulsa Roughnecks	Edinburg, Texas
7:30 P.M.	Lemoine (yellow card) 34'; Hernandez (yellow card) 45+3'; Castellanos (yellow card) 78'; Rodriguez (yellow card) 81'	Report	Prasad (yellow card) 26'; Marlon 50'; Boakye-Mensa (yellow card) 87'	Stadium: H-E-B Park; Attendance: 3,861; Referee: Dejan Susak

September 21 29	Tulsa Roughnecks	0–1	Orange County SC	Tulsa, Oklahoma
7:00 PM CDT	Reyes (yellow card) 23'; Altamirano (yellow card) 61'	Report	Forrester (yellow card) 31'; Hume (yellow card) 82'; Quinn (yellow card) 90+1'; Coleman 90+4'	Stadium: ONEOK Field; Attendance: 1,513; Referee: Guido Gonzales, Jr.

September 25 30	Tulsa Roughnecks	4–3	San Antonio FC	Tulsa, Oklahoma
7:00 p.m. CDT	Uzo 2'; Marlon 6'; Lobo (yellow card) 24'; Altamirano 45' (pen.); Mompremier 87'; Addai (yellow card) 90'; Hedrick (yellow card) 90+5'	Report	Castillo 12', 25', (yellow card) 53'; Restrepo 30'; Taylor (yellow card) 50'; Lahoud (yellow card) 73'; Greene (yellow card) 90+2'	Stadium: Oneok Field; Attendance: 1,215; Referee: Victor Rivas

September 28 31	Tacoma Defiance	1–1	Tulsa Roughnecks	Tacoma, Washington
9:00 p.m. CDT	Leyva (yellow card) 33'; Hinds (yellow card) 53'; Hopeau 86'	Report	Uzo (yellow card) 36' (yellow-red card) 75', (goal) 60'; Marlon (yellow card) 72'	Stadium: Cheney Stadium; Attendance: 3,327; Referee: Reyna Fonseca

October 5 32	Tulsa Roughnecks	2–3	Sacramento Republic FC	Tulsa, Oklahoma
7:00 p.m. CDT	Marlon 31'; Silva 40'; Roberts (yellow card) 45'	Report	Bijev 13'; Enevoldsen 19'; Werner (yellow card) 42'; Iwasa 59'	Stadium: Oneok Field; Attendance: 2,257; Referee: Alejandro Mariscal

October 12 33	Tulsa Roughnecks	2–1	New Mexico United	Tulsa, Oklahoma
7:00 p.m. CDT	Uzo 10'; Marlon (yellow card) 48' (yellow-red card) 73'; Boakye-Mensa (yellow card) 53'; Lobo (yellow card) 89'; Silva 90+6'	Report	Suggs (yellow card) 37'; Sandoval 68'; Moar (yellow card) 86'	Stadium: Oneok Field; Attendance: 1,353; Referee: Lukasz Szpala

October 19 34	Tulsa Roughnecks	0–3	Reno 1868 FC	Tulsa, Oklahoma
7:00 p.m. CDT	Boakye-Mensa (yellow card) 35'; Uzo (yellow card) 49'; Gonzalez (yellow card) 77'; Mompremier (yellow card) 85'	Report	Hertzog 15' (pen.), 83'; Apodaca 22'	Stadium: Oneok Field; Attendance: 1,390; Referee: Gabriele Giusti

=== U.S. Open Cup ===
As a member of the USL Championship, the Roughnecks entered the tournament in the Second Round, played May 14–15, 2019

May 14 Second Round	Austin Bold FC (Texas)	2–0	(Oklahoma) Tulsa Roughnecks	Austin, Texas
7:30 PM	Báez (yellow card) 29'; Guadarrama 34'; André Lima 74'	Report	Blackwell (yellow card) 33'; Makinde (yellow card) 69'	Stadium: Austin Bold Stadium; Attendance: 1,266; Referee: Luis Guardia
