= 2020 FC Tulsa season =

FC Tulsa
2020 season
- Head coach: Michael Nsien
- Stadium: ONEOK Field; Tulsa, Oklahoma
- USL: Conference: 7th Group D: 2nd
- USL Cup: Conference Quarterfinals
- 2020 U.S. Open Cup: Cancelled
- Black Gold Derby: Champions
- Highest home attendance: 3,381 vs. SA (Sept. 26)
- Lowest home attendance: 2,255 vs. ATX (Aug. 19)
- Average home league attendance: 2,636
- Biggest win: STL 0–2 TUL (Aug. 8); TUL 2–0 COS (Oct. 3)
- Biggest defeat: SA 2–0 TUL (Aug. 22)
City Kit colors	State Kit colors

The 2020 FC Tulsa season was the franchise's 6th season in the USL Championship, the second-tier professional soccer league in the United States and Canada. It was their first season since the club's rebranding from Tulsa Roughnecks to FC Tulsa.

== Club ==
As of October 6, 2020

No.	Position	Nation	Player
1	GK	USA	Sean Lewis
2	GK	USA	Bryan Byars
3	DF	ALB	Vangjel Zguro
4	DF	CMR	Cyprian Hedrick
5	DF	ENG	Callum Chapman-Page
6	FW	CUB	Ariel Martínez
7	FW	GHA	Panin Boakye
8	MF	USA	Eric Bird
9	FW	NGR	Toby Uzo
10	FW	BRA	Marlon
11	MF	HON	Christian Altamirano
12	GK	CAN	Andrew MacRae
13	DF	USA	Matthew Sheldon
14	MF	HON	Brayan Reyes
15	DF	USA	Kevin Garcia
16	MF	BRA	Rodrigo da Costa
17	FW	NGR	Mfon Udoh
18	DF	NGR	Solomon Kwambe
21	MF	USA	Fabián Bastidas
22	DF	USA	Bradley Bourgeois
24	MF	NGR	Raphael Ayagwa
29	MF	USA	Ciaran Winters
30	MF	RSA	Lebo Moloto
92	FW	CUB	Darío Suárez

== Competitions ==
=== Exhibitions ===
February 8 Preseason 1	FC Tulsa	2–0	Oklahoma Wesleyan Eagles	Tulsa, Oklahoma
2:00PM CDT	da Costa 43' (pen.); Suárez 65'	Report		Stadium: Titan Sports Complex

February 16 Preseason 2	FC Tulsa	1–1	Saint Louis FC	Tulsa, Oklahoma
2:00PM CDT	Suárez 35'	Report	Blackwood 90'	Stadium: Titan Sports Complex
Note: Played three 40-minute periods.

February 19 Preseason 3	FC Tulsa	1–1	Oral Roberts Golden Eagles	Tulsa, Oklahoma
7:00PM CDT	Winters 65'	Report	11'	Stadium: Holland Hall

February 22 Preseason 4	Rogers State Hillcats	0–1	FC Tulsa	Claremore, Oklahoma
2:00PM CDT		Report	Suárez 65'	Stadium: Soldier Field

February 25 Preseason 5	North Texas SC	1–3	FC Tulsa	Frisco, Texas
2:00PM CDT	Sealy 16'	Report	Boakye 23'; Marlon 34'; Udoh 73'	Stadium: Toyota Soccer Center

February 29 Preseason 6	FC Tulsa	1–2	Sporting Kansas City II	Tulsa, Oklahoma
1:00PM CDT	Martinez 62'	Report	8'; 78' (pen.)	Stadium: Titan Sports Complex

=== USL Championship ===
==== Standings — Group D ====
Pos	Team	Pld	W	D	L	GF	GA	GD	Pts	PPG	Qualification
1	San Antonio FC	16	10	3	3	30	14	+16	33	2.06	Advance to USL Championship Playoffs
2	FC Tulsa	15	6	7	2	21	16	+5	25	1.67	Advance to USL Championship Playoffs
3	Austin Bold FC	16	5	7	4	30	27	+3	22	1.38	
4	Rio Grande Valley FC Toros	14	2	3	9	17	28	−11	9	0.64	
5	OKC Energy FC	16	1	7	8	12	29	−17	10	0.63	

Source: USL

==== Match results ====
March 7 1	Sacramento Republic FC	1–1	FC Tulsa	Sacramento, California
9:30 PM CST	Skundrich (yellow card) 23', (goal) 42'; Sargis (yellow card) 28'; Barahona (yellow card) 32'	Report	Moloto (yellow card) 24'; Sheldon (yellow card) 60'; Garcia (yellow card) 68' da Costa 79'; Martínez (yellow card) 90+3'	Stadium: Papa Murphy's Park; Attendance: 11,569; Referee: Elijio Arreguin

July 13 2	OKC Energy	1–1	FC Tulsa	Oklahoma City, Oklahoma
7:00 PM CDT	Chávez 40'; Hyland (yellow card) 51'; Basuljevic (yellow card) 53'; Harris (yellow card) 87'	Report	da Costa 45+5'	Stadium: Taft Stadium; Attendance: 1,626; Referee: Matthew Corrigan
Note: Black Gold Derby

August 1 4	Rio Grande Valley FC Toros	1–2	FC Tulsa	Edinburg, Texas
8:00 PM CDT	Castellanos 71'; Adams (yellow card) 73'	Report	Marlon 26'; Bird (yellow card) 28'; Martinez 74' (pen.) da Costa (yellow card) 90+1'; Boakye (yellow card) 90+2'	Stadium: H-E-B Park; Referee: Elton Garcia

August 8 5	Saint Louis FC	0–2	FC Tulsa	Fenton, Missouri
7:00 PM CDT	Umar (yellow card) 18'; Blackwood (yellow card) 75'; Bryan (yellow card) 83'	Report	Bird 43'; Garcia (yellow card) 59'; Martinez (yellow card) 72' da Costa (yellow card) 87'; Suárez 90'	Stadium: West Community Stadium; Attendance: 950; Referee: Jervis Atagana

August 12 6	FC Tulsa	0–0	San Antonio FC	Tulsa, Oklahoma
7:00 PM CDT	Bird (yellow card) 44'; Garcia (yellow card) 69'; Moloto (yellow card) 72'; Sheldon (yellow card) 85'	Report	Montgomery (yellow card) 37'; Solignac (yellow card) 90+4'	Stadium: Oneok Field; Attendance: 2,445; Referee: Matthew Corrigan

August 19 7	FC Tulsa	2–2	Austin Bold FC	Tulsa, Oklahoma
7:00 PM CDT	Marlon (yellow card) 16'; Moloto 26'; Suárez 65'; Ayagwa (yellow card) 69'	Report	Taylor (yellow card) 44'; Garcia 45+2', (yellow card) 61'; Báez (yellow card) 49'; McFarlane 83', (yellow card) 89'; Jome (yellow card) 88'	Stadium: Oneok Field; Attendance: 2,255; Referee: Jon Freemon

August 22 8	San Antonio FC	2–0	FC Tulsa	San Antonio, Texas
8:00 PM CDT	Solignac (yellow card) 41', (goal) 42'; Bailone 89'	Report	Marlon (yellow card) 59' da Costa (yellow card) 64'; Bourgeois (yellow card) 81'; Bird (yellow card) 82' (yellow-red card) 90+8'; Bastidas (red card) 87'; Martinez (yellow card) 90+7'	Stadium: Toyota Field; Referee: Luis Guardia

August 29 9	FC Tulsa	1–2	Sporting Kansas City II	Tulsa, Oklahoma
7:00 PM CDT	Kwambe (yellow card) 36'; Martinez 39'	Report	Mompremier 20', (yellow card) 86'; Riley (yellow card) 25'; Harris 55'; Duke (yellow card) 90'; Davis (yellow card) 90+4'	Stadium: Oneok Field; Attendance: Chris Ruska; Referee: 2,790

September 2 10	FC Tulsa	2–1	Rio Grande Valley FC Toros	Tulsa, Oklahoma
7:00 PM CDT	Suárez 25', 68'; Marlon (yellow card) 27'; Bird (yellow card) 43'; Moloto (yellow card) 75'; Zguro (yellow card) 84'	Report	Prpa 28'	Stadium: ONEOK Field; Attendance: 1,836; Referee: Matthew Corrigan

September 5 11	Austin Bold FC	1–1	FC Tulsa	Austin, Texas
8:00 PM CDT	Avila 74'	Report	Suárez 30'	Stadium: Austin Bold Stadium; Referee: Elton García

September 8 3	Austin Bold FC	2–2	FC Tulsa	Austin, Texas
8:00 PM CDT	Guadarrama 45+5' (pen.); F. Garcia 52'; Forbes (yellow card) 73'	Report	Suárez 17', 37'; Bourgeois (yellow card) 45+5'; K. Garcia (yellow card) 67'	Stadium: Austin Bold Stadium; Referee: Melvin Rivas
Note: Rescheduled from Thursday, July 23, 2020.

September 12 12	FC Tulsa	1–1	OKC Energy	Tulsa, Oklahoma
7:00 PM CDT	Marlon (yellow card) 55'; Suárez 73'; Moloto (yellow card) 81'	Report	Chavez (yellow card) 35'; Hernández (yellow card) 71' (yellow-red card) 77'; Gordon 90'; Ibeagha (yellow card) 90+5'	Stadium: Oneok Field; Attendance: 2,932; Referee: Lukasz Szpala
Note: Black Gold Derby

September 26 14	FC Tulsa	1–0	San Antonio FC	Tulsa, Oklahoma
7:00 PM CDT	Moloto (yellow card) 59'; Suárez (yellow card) 61'; Martinez (yellow card) 63'; Bird 90+2'	Report		Stadium: Oneok Field; Attendance: 3,381; Referee: Ismir Pekmic

September 30 15	FC Tulsa	3–2	OKC Energy	Tulsa, Oklahoma
7:00 PM CDT	Marlon 15'; Chapman-Page (yellow card) 35'; Uzo 79', 88'; Altamirano (yellow card) 86'	Report	Cato 12'; Taravel (yellow card) 45+2'; Chávez (yellow card) 45+4'; Stephenson 57'; Amico (yellow card) 70'; Ellis-Hayden (yellow card) 84'	Stadium: Oneok Field; Attendance: 2,320; Referee: Matthew Thompson
Note: Black Gold Derby

October 3 16	FC Tulsa	2–0	Colorado Springs Switchbacks FC	Tulsa, Oklahoma
7:00 PM CDT	Marlon 36', (yellow card) 38' da Costa 40'; Martínez (yellow card) 65'; Bourgeois (yellow card) 86'	Report	Diz Pe (yellow card) 43' (yellow-red card) 90+6'; Kurimoto (yellow card) 68'; Burt (yellow card) 81'	Stadium: ONEOK Field; Attendance: 3,128; Referee: Matthew Corrigan

October 6 13	Rio Grande Valley FC Toros	P-P	FC Tulsa	Edinburg, Texas
8:00 PM CDT				Stadium: H-E-B Park
Note: Match postponed due to a positive Covid-19 test in the RGVFC organization. Not played because not necessary for playoff qualification.

=== USL Championship Playoffs ===
October 10, 2020 Conference Quarterfinals	El Paso Locomotive FC	2–2 (a.e.t.) (4–2 p)	FC Tulsa	El Paso, TX
7:30 p.m. MDT	Carrijó 19', 82'; Borelli (yellow card) 67'; Rebellón (yellow card) 96'	Report	Bird (yellow card) 24' da Costa 38'; Chapman-Page (yellow card) 61', (goal) 68', (red card) 101'	Stadium: Southwest University Park; Attendance: 1,659; Referee: Brandon Stevis
	Penalties
	Ross (penalty scored); Rebellón (penalty scored); Ryan (penalty scored); Robinson (penalty scored)		(penalty scored) Altamirano; (penalty missed) Moloto; (penalty missed) Martínez; (penalty scored) Bourgeois

=== U.S. Open Cup ===
As a USL Championship club, the FC Tulsa were to begin play by April 7–9. However, the tournament was suspended and eventually cancelled due to the COVID-19 pandemic.
