= 2019 Rio Grande Valley FC season =

Rio Grande Valley FC Toros
2019 season
- Head coach: Gerson Echeverry
- United Soccer League Championship: Conference: Western; Overall: 0-0
- USL Playoffs: DNQ
- Copa Tejas: 3rd
- Highest home attendance: League/All: 4,967 (October 18 vs. Portland)
- Lowest home attendance: League/All: 2,408 (July 20 vs. Sacramento)
- Average home league attendance: 3,839
- Biggest win: 3-0 (June 15 vs. Colorado Springs Switchbacks FC); 5-2 (April 20 vs. Las Vegas Lights FC)
- Biggest defeat: 0-5 (September 18 at Fresno FC)
Home colors	Away colors	Third colors

The 2019 Rio Grande Valley FC Toros season was the 4th season for Rio Grande Valley FC Toros in USL Championship, the second-tier professional soccer league in the United States and Canada.

== Club ==
Current first team squad, as of February 15, 2019.
Note: Flags indicate national team as defined under FIFA eligibility rules; some limited exceptions apply. Players may hold more than one non-FIFA nationality. Squad correct as of January 28, 2019.

No.	Pos.	Nation	Player
0	GK	USA	Osmar Chavero
1	GK	BEL	Nico Corti
2	MF	USA	Carlos Vivero
3	DF	USA	Robert Coronado
4	DF	USA	Robert Castellanos
6	MF	COL	David Cabrera
7	MF	COL	Camilo Monroy
8	MF	SLV	Romilio Hernandez
9	FW	JAM	Maalique Foster (on loan from Alajuelense)
10	MF	USA	Victor Garza
11	FW	PER	Jesús Enríquez
12	MF	USA	Brad Dunwell
13	FW	COL	Wilmer Cabrera Jr
14	DF	USA	Zach Jackson
15	MF	COL	Andres Arcila
16	DF	USA	Andrew Samuels
17	FW	BLZ	Michael Salazar
19	MF	USA	Nico Lemoine
20	DF	USA	Conor Donovan
22	DF	COL	Héctor Copete
23	FW	MEX	Aldo Quintanilla
26	DF	USA	Chris Duvall
27	MF	USA	Kevin Rodriguez
28	DF	USA	Sam Junqua
29	FW	USA	Brandon Morales
30	MF	USA	Isidro Martinez
32	DF	NZL	Kyle Adams
58	FW	PAN	Carlos Small (on loan from Árabe Unido)
99	GK	USA	Ben Willis
—	GK	USA	Isaac Acevedo

Signed to first team contract with MLS affiliate Houston Dynamo.
Houston Dynamo academy player.

== Competitions ==
=== Preseason ===
January 26	Houston Dynamo	1–0	Rio Grande Valley FC Toros	Houston, Texas
6:00 PM CST	Elis 24'	Report		Stadium: BBVA Compass Stadium; Attendance: 3,000+
Note: Two 30-minute periods, followed by one 30-minute period of RGV/Academy players.

January 29	Houston Dynamo	2–1	Rio Grande Valley FC Toros	Houston, Texas
10:00 AM CST	McNamara 48'; Hairston 88'	Report	Foster 30'	Stadium: Houston Sports Park; Attendance: Closed-door

February 10	Rio Grande Valley FC Toros	1–1	University of Texas Rio Grande Valley	Edinburg, Texas
7:00 PM CST				Stadium: H-E-B Park

February 16	Rio Grande Valley FC Toros	0–0	Houston Baptist University	Houston, Texas
12:00 PM CST		Report		Stadium: Houston Sports Park

February 23	Rio Grande Valley FC Toros	3–1	Austin Bold FC	Edinburg, Texas
7:00 PM CST	Small 3'; Trialist 51'; Garza 109' (pen.)	Report	19'; (yellow card) 49'	Stadium: H-E-B Park
Note: Match played with two periods of 45 minutes and one period of 35 minutes

March 1	San Antonio FC	4–3	Rio Grande Valley FC Toros	San Antonio, Texas
1:00 PM CST	Guzmán 4', 54'; Forbes 31'; 60' (o.g.)		Small 21'; Foster 24'; W. Cabrera 53'	Stadium: Toyota Field

=== USL Championship ===
==== Standings ====
Pos	Team	Pld	W	D	L	GF	GA	GD	Pts	Qualification
10	New Mexico United	34	11	13	10	59	57	+2	46	Play-In Round
11	San Antonio FC	34	12	9	13	62	57	+5	45	
12	Rio Grande Valley Toros	34	11	8	15	50	58	−8	41	
13	Las Vegas Lights FC	34	11	8	15	46	56	−10	41	
14	Portland Timbers 2	34	10	8	16	65	71	−6	38	

Source: USL Championship Standings
Rules for classification: 1) total wins; 2) total goal differential; 3) total goals scored; 4) points earned against top four Conference finishers; 5) disciplinary points; 6) coin toss or drawing of lots

==== Match results ====
The 2019 USL Championship season schedule for the club was announced on December 19, 2018.

Win Draw Loss Upcoming fixture

Unless otherwise noted, all times in CDT

March 8 1	Tacoma Defiance	1–0	Rio Grande Valley FC Toros	Tacoma, Washington
9:00 PM	Diaz 49'; Atencio (yellow card) 68'; Ndow (yellow card) 84'	Report	Coronado (yellow card) 77'	Stadium: Cheney Stadium; Attendance: 3,432; Referee: Alejandro Mariscal

March 16 2	Rio Grande Valley FC Toros	0–2	Fresno FC	Edinburg, Texas
7:30 PM	Arcila (yellow card) 83'	Report	Basuljevic 2', 60'; Chavez (yellow card) 13'; Ellis-Hayden (yellow card) 22'; Moses (yellow card) 33'	Stadium: H-E-B Park; Attendance: 4,460; Referee: Elijio Arreguin

March 23 3	El Paso Locomotive FC	2–2	Rio Grande Valley FC Toros	El Paso, Texas
8:30 PM	Ross 45+1'; Rebellón (yellow card) 59'; Contreras (yellow card) 72'; Gebhard 78'	Report	Dunwell (yellow card) 47'; Hernandez (yellow card) 66', (goal) 79'; Duvall (yellow card) 69'; Enríquez 90'	Stadium: Southwest University Park; Attendance: 7,458; Referee: Alejandro Aguilera

March 29 4	Tulsa Roughnecks FC	2–1	Rio Grande Valley FC Toros	Tulsa, Oklahoma
7:00 P.M.	da Costa 19' (pen.); Bastidas 45+1', (yellow card) 70'; Legendre (yellow card) 56'	Report	Hernandez (yellow card) 57'; Lemoine 72'	Stadium: ONEOK Field; Attendance: 2,430; Referee: Calin Radosav

April 6 5	Rio Grande Valley FC Toros	0–0	New Mexico United	Edinburg, Texas
7:30 PM	Cabezas (yellow card) 16'; Foster (yellow card) 40'; Salazar (yellow card) 54'; Samuels (yellow card) 71'	Report	Madden (yellow card) 89'	Stadium: H-E-B Park; Attendance: 3,496; Referee: Michael Radchuk

April 13 6	Rio Grande Valley FC Toros	2–1	OKC Energy FC	Edinburg, Texas
7:30 PM	Salazar 54'; Enríquez 87', (yellow card) 88'; Foster (yellow card) 90+4'	Report	Harris (yellow card) 58', (goal) 90+2'	Stadium: H-E-B Park; Attendance: 3,387; Referee: Arturo Ibarra

April 20 7	Rio Grande Valley FC Toros	5–2	Las Vegas Lights FC	Edinburg, Texas
7:30 PM	Cabrera 15' (pen.); Martinez 19'; Robinson 46' (o.g.); Foster (yellow card) 74', (goal) 79'; Small 85'; Adams (yellow card) 90'	Report	Sandoval (yellow card) 35'; Etaka (yellow card) 63'; Torres 65'; Cruz (yellow card) 86'; Ochoa 90+1'	Stadium: H-E-B Park; Attendance: 3,483; Referee: Matt Franz

April 24 8	LA Galaxy II	4–4	Rio Grande Valley FC Toros	Carson, California
9:30 PM	Traore 39'; Koreniuk 74', 90+6'; DePuy 87'	Preview	Coronado (yellow card) 20'; Hernandez (yellow card) 66'; Salazar 77', 79', 90+1'; Small 83'; Deric (yellow card) 90+3'	Stadium: Dignity Health Sports Park; Attendance: 536; Referee: Alejandro Mariscal

April 30 9	Portland Timbers 2	1–2	Rio Grande Valley FC Toros	Portland, Oregon
9:00 P.M.	Miller (yellow card) 19'; Farfan (yellow card) 45+1'; Jadama (yellow card) 64', (goal) 71'; Smith (yellow card) 88'	Report	W. Cabrera 9'; Small 85'	Stadium: Merlo Field; Attendance: 1,120; Referee: Farhad Dadkho

May 10 10	Phoenix Rising FC	3–1	Rio Grande Valley FC Toros	Scottsdale, Arizona
9:30 PM	Jahn 16', 28' (pen.); Musa 69'	Report	Foster 71'	Stadium: Casino Arizona Field; Attendance: 6,715; Referee: Dejan Susak

May 18 11	Rio Grande Valley FC Toros	2–2	LA Galaxy II	Edinburg, Texas
7:30 PM	Foster 34'; Donovan (yellow card) 48'; Salazar 57'	Report	Ontiveros 16'; Requejo (yellow card) 19'; Vera (yellow card) 62'; Shultz (yellow card) 69'; Zubak 90+2'	Stadium: H-E-B Park; Attendance: 4,892; Referee: Alejandro Aguilera, Jr.

May 25 12	Rio Grande Valley FC Toros	3–1	San Antonio FC	Edinburg, Texas
7:30 PM	Enríquez 30'; Salazar 36', 58'; Dunwell (yellow card) 74'; Lemoine (yellow card) 90+3'	Report	Guzmán 70'; Yaro (yellow card) 86'	Stadium: H-E-B Park; Attendance: 4,377; Referee: Michael Radchuk

June 1 13	Orange County SC	2–1	Rio Grande Valley FC Toros	Irvine, California
9:00 PM	Quinn (yellow card) 4' (yellow-red card) 67'; Seaton 10', (yellow card) 77'; Jones 31', (yellow card) 32' (yellow-red card) 90+3'; Crisostomo (yellow card) 38'; Amico (yellow card) 90'	Report	Coronado 41'	Stadium: Championship Soccer Stadium; Attendance: 3,280; Referee: Ismir Pekmic

June 8 14	Real Monarchs	5–3	Rio Grande Valley FC Toros	Herriman, Utah
9:00 P.M.	Martínez 13', (yellow card) 62', (goal) 76'; Heard 21'; Chang 22'; Powder (yellow card) 48', (goal) 88'; Pierre (yellow card) 66'	Report	Salazar 60'; Enriquez (yellow card) 64'; Small 83', 90+3'	Stadium: Zions Bank Stadium; Attendance: 1,709; Referee: Elton García

June 15 15	Rio Grande Valley FC Toros	3–0	Colorado Springs Switchbacks FC	Edinburg, Texas
7:30 PM	Hernandez (yellow card) 32'; W. Cabrera 55'; Small 74' (pen.), 85'; Enriquez (yellow card) 84'	Report	Schweitzer (yellow card) 42'; Seth (yellow card) 50'	Stadium: H-E-B Park; Attendance: 4,004; Referee: Dejan Susak

June 22 16	Rio Grande Valley FC Toros	0–1	Austin Bold FC	Edinburg, Texas
7:30 PM	Castellanos (yellow card) 22'; Adams (yellow card) 83'	Report	Saramutin (yellow card) 32'; McFarlane (yellow card) 41'; Lima 50'; Kléber (yellow card) 55'; Tyrpak (yellow card) 88'; Okugo (yellow card) 90+4'; Restrepo (yellow card) 90+6'	Stadium: H-E-B Park; Attendance: 3,286; Referee: Gustavo Solorio

July 3 17	Reno 1868 FC	4–0	Rio Grande Valley FC Toros	Reno, Nevada
9:30 PM	Gleadle 23', 45'; Akanyirige (yellow card) 32'; Hertzog 48'; Carroll 51'; Partida (yellow card) 83'	Report	Monroy (yellow card) 65'; Rodriguez (yellow card) 90'	Stadium: Greater Nevada Field; Attendance: 4,414; Referee: Mark Allatin

July 6 18	Rio Grande Valley FC	0–0	Tacoma Defiance	Edinburg, Texas
7:30 PM	Junqua (yellow card) 42'	Report	Hinds (yellow card) 58'; Atencio (yellow card) 69'; Daley (yellow card) 78'; Vargas (yellow card) 90+6'	Stadium: H-E-B Park; Attendance: 3,228; Referee: Calin Radosav

July 13 19	Rio Grande Valley FC Toros	0–1	Phoenix Rising FC	Edinburg, Texas
7:30 PM	Enríquez (yellow card) 38'; Rodríguez (yellow card) 90+3'	Report	Asante (yellow card) 32'; Jahn 62'; Musa (yellow card) 85'; Aguinaga (yellow card) 87'	Stadium: H-E-B Park; Attendance: 3,339; Referee: Elton García

July 20 20	Rio Grande Valley FC Toros	2–1	Sacramento Republic FC	Edinburg, Texas
7:30 PM	Cabrera 32'; Small (yellow card) 87'; Adams 90'; Lemoine (yellow card) 90+2'	Report	Martinez 84' (o.g.); Chantzopoulos (yellow card) 87'; Mahoney (yellow card) 90+1'	Stadium: H-E-B Park; Attendance: 2,408; Referee: Matthew Thompson

July 27 21	Las Vegas Lights FC	2–1	Rio Grande Valley FC Toros	Las Vegas, Nevada
9:30 PM	Robinson 10'; Parra 31'; Tabortetaka (yellow card) 41'; Rojas (yellow card) 88'	Report	Small 26'; Bird (yellow card) 38'	Stadium: Cashman Field; Attendance: 8,818; Referee: Elijio Arreguin

August 3 22	Rio Grande Valley FC Toros	1–2	Reno 1868 FC	Edinburg, Texas
7:30 PM	Arcila 10'; Bird (yellow card) 73'	Report	Janjigian 9'; Apodaca 20'; Akanyirige (yellow card) 30'; Seymore (yellow card) 90+2'	Stadium: H-E-B Park; Attendance: 3,804; Referee: Gabriele Giusti

August 10 23	Colorado Springs Switchbacks FC	3–3	Rio Grande Valley FC Toros	Colorado Springs, Colorado
7:00 PM	Malcolm 12'; Burt 20', (yellow card) 47'; Robinson (yellow card) 45+2'; Schweitzer (yellow card) 81'; Rwatubyaye 90+3'	Report	Salazar 27'; Rodriguez 42'; Arcila 58'; Coronado (yellow card) 90+6'	Stadium: Weidner Field; Attendance: 4,254; Referee: Eric Tattersall

August 17 24	San Antonio FC	2–2	Rio Grande Valley FC Toros	San Antonio, Texas
7:30 PM	Barmby 14'; Parano 44'; Greene (yellow card) 68'; López (yellow card) 88'	Report	Fuenmayor (red card) 31'; Martinez (yellow card) 38'; Samuels (yellow card) 45+4'; Castellanos (yellow card) 51'; Small 75'; Ackon 80' (o.g.); Rodriguez (yellow card) 87'; Jackson (yellow card) 90'	Stadium: Toyota Field; Attendance: 7,533; Referee: Sergii Demianchuk

August 24 25	Rio Grande Valley FC Toros	1–0	El Paso Locomotive FC	Edinburg, Texas
7:30 PM	Bird 46'	Report	Ryan (yellow card) 56' (yellow-red card) 90+1'	Stadium: H-E-B Park; Attendance: 4,275; Referee: Luis Guardia

September 1 26	Austin Bold FC	3–0	Rio Grande Valley FC Toros	Austin, Texas
7:30 PM	Twumasi 33'; Taylor (yellow card) 55'; Lima 60'; Promise (yellow card) 72', (goal) 87'	Report	Corti (red card) 44'; Enríquez (yellow card) 57'; Fuenmayor (yellow card) 77'; Coronado (yellow card) 85'	Stadium: Bold Stadium; Attendance: 1,968; Referee: Kevin Broadley

September 7 27	Rio Grande Valley FC Toros	0–1	Tulsa Roughnecks FC	Edinburg, Texas
7:30 P.M.	Lemoine (yellow card) 34'; Hernandez (yellow card) 45+3'; Castellanos (yellow card) 78'; Rodriguez (yellow card) 81'	Report	Prasad (yellow card) 26'; Marlon 50'; Boakye-Mensa (yellow card) 87'	Stadium: H-E-B Park; Attendance: 3,861; Referee: Dejan Susak

September 15 28	Sacramento Republic FC	2–1	Rio Grande Valley FC Toros	Sacramento, California
7:00 PM	Werner 18'; Formella 81', (yellow card) 83'; Shuttleworth (yellow card) 90+2'	Report	Lemoine 5'; Castellanos (yellow card) 68'; Bird (yellow card) 83'	Stadium: Papa Murphy's Park; Attendance: 10,688; Referee: Joseph Salinas

September 18 29	Fresno FC	5–0	Rio Grande Valley FC Toros	Fresno, California
9:30 PM	Lawal 6', 63', (yellow card) 69'; Alihodžić 30' (pen.); Chavez 44', 61'	Report	Donovan (yellow card) 28'	Stadium: Chukchansi Park; Attendance: 2,343; Referee: Brandon Stevis

September 21 30	Rio Grande Valley FC Toros	3–1	Real Monarchs	Edinburg, Texas
7:30 P.M.	Enríquez 32' (pen.); Bird 56'; Lemoine (yellow card) 58'; Salazar 75'	Report	Blake (yellow card) 54'; Fertil-Pierre (yellow card) 72'; German 81'; Chang (yellow card) 82'; Powder (yellow card) 85'	Stadium: H-E-B Park; Attendance: 4,037; Referee: Ismir Pekmic

September 28 31	Rio Grande Valley FC Toros	2–0	Orange County SC	Edinburg, Texas
7:30 PM	Lemoine (yellow card) 53'; Rodriguez 71'; Obregón, Jr. 85'; Martinez (yellow card) 88'	Report	van Ewijk (yellow card) 54'; Duke (yellow card) 55'; Orozco (red card) 90+2'	Stadium: H-E-B Park; Attendance: 3,502; Referee: Gabriele Giusti

October 5 32	New Mexico United	1–1	Rio Grande Valley FC Toros	Albuquerque, New Mexico
8:30 PM	Hamilton 44'; Moar (yellow card) 55'; Muhammad (yellow card) 65'	Report	Junqua (yellow card) 26'; Small 40' (pen.); Rodriguez (yellow card) 45+3'	Stadium: Isotopes Park; Attendance: 11,196; Referee: Matthew Thompson

October 13 33	OKC Energy FC	0–2	Rio Grande Valley FC Toros	Oklahoma City, Oklahoma
6:00 PM		Report	Donovan 70'; Small 78' (pen.)	Stadium: Taft Stadium; Attendance: 6,549; Referee: Daniel Gutierrez

October 18 34	Rio Grande Valley FC Toros	2–1	Portland Timbers 2	Edinburg, Texas
7:30 PM	Beckford 15'; Small 43'	Report	Hurtado (yellow card) 17'; Wharton 19'; Ornstil (yellow card) 34'; Hanson (yellow card) 48'; Diz (yellow card) 90+3'	Stadium: H-E-B Park; Attendance: 4,967; Referee: Lukasz Szpala

=== U.S. Open Cup ===
Due to their hybrid affiliation with the Dynamo, RGVFC was one of 13 teams expressly forbidden from entering the Cup competition.
