= Marlon =

Marlon is a masculine given name. According to the Oxford Dictionary of First Names, the popularity of Marlon Brando led to general awareness of the name (his father was also named Marlon), though the origin of the name is not known. Speculation places the name's origin in France as a derivative of Marc.

The name may refer to:

== People ==
=== Arts and entertainment ===
- Marlon Brando (1924–2004), American actor
- Marlon Jackson (born 1957), American singer, a member of The Jackson 5
- Marlon Klein (born 1957), German music producer
- Marlon Riggs (1957–1994), American filmmaker, educator, poet and gay rights activist
- Marley Marl (born 1962), American rapper
- Marlon Mullen (born 1964), American painter
- Marlon James (novelist) (born 1970), Jamaican writer, winner of the 2015 Man Booker Prize
- Marlon Jordan (born 1970), American jazz trumpeter, composer and bandleader
- Marlon Fletcher (1971–2003), American rapper and hip hopper known by his stage name Big DS
- Marlon Wayans (born 1972), American actor and writer
- Marlon Abela (born 1975), Lebanese restaurateur
- Marlon Forrester (born 1976), Guyanese painter
- Marlon Fernández (born 1977), Cuban salsa singer, winner of the third season of Objetivo Fama
- Marlon Kittel (born 1983), German actor
- Marlon Davis (comedian) (born 1983), British stand-up comedian
- Marlon Roudette (born 1983), British Vincentian singer, songwriter and rapper
- Marlon Knauer (born 1987), German singer, known professional as Marlon
- Marlon Blue (born 1988), Austrian actor
- Marlon Chaplin (born 1989), Canadian musician
- Marlon Motlop (born 1990), musician, aka MARLON (former AFL footballer)
- Marlon Williams (New Zealand musician) (born 1990), New Zealand musician
- Marlon Teixeira (born 1991), Brazilian model
- Marlon Craft (born 1993), American rapper
- Marlon Asher (fl. 2006–present), Trinidadian reggae singer
- Marlon Saunders, American 21st century singer, songwriter and record producer
- Marlon Ramos, Brazilian music producer
- Marlon Williams (American musician), American hip-hop guitarist
- Marlon Daniel, American conductor
- Marlon (streamer), Swedish streamer

=== Politics ===
- Marlon Guillermo Lara Orellana (born 1966), Honduran politician
- Marlon Tábora Muñoz (born 1969), Honduran politician
- Marlon Reis (born 1981), American animal rights activist
- Marlon Kimpson, American politician elected to the South Carolina Senate in 2013
- Marlon Pascua, Honduran defense minister

=== Sports ===
==== Association football ====
- Marlon Brandão (born 1963), Brazilian retired footballer
- Marlon Maro (born 1965), Filipino footballer
- Marlon Menjívar (born 1965), Salvadoran footballer
- Marlon Beresford (born 1969), English former football goalkeeper
- Marlon Ayoví (born 1971), Ecuadorian retired footballer
- Marlon Piñero (born 1972), Filipino footballer
- Marlon Escalante (born 1974), Venezuelan football referee
- Marlon James (footballer) (born 1976), Vincentian retired footballer
- Marlon de Souza Lopes (born 1976), Brazilian footballer
- Marlon LeBlanc (born 1976), American soccer coach
- Marlon Broomes (born 1977), English former footballer
- Marlon Felter (born 1978), Surinamese footballer
- Marlon Harewood (born 1979), English footballer
- Marlon Rojas (born 1979), Trinidadian football player and coach
- Marlon King (born 1980), English footballer
- Marlon Patterson (born 1983), English footballer
- Marlon Rogerio Schwantes (born 1984), Brazilian footballer
- Marlon Piedrahita (born 1985), Colombian footballer
- Marlon Farias Castelo Branco (born 1985), Brazilian footballer known as Marlon
- Marlon Antonio Fernández (born 1986), Venezuelan footballer
- Marlon Barrios (born 1986), Colombian footballer
- Marlon Ventura Rodrigues (born 1986), Brazilian footballer
- Marlon Araújo (born 1987), Brazilian futsal player
- Marlon Pereira Freire (born 1987), Aruban footballer
- Marlon Trejo (born 1988), Salvadoran footballer
- Marlon da Silva (born 1990), Brazilian footballer
- Marlon Bastardo (born 1990), Venezuelan footballer
- Marlon Jackson (footballer) (born 1990), English footballer
- Marlon Krause (born 1990), German footballer
- Marlon (footballer, born 1990), Brazilian footballer
- Marlon Ganchozo (born 1991), Ecuadorian footballer
- Marlon de Jesús (born 1991), Ecuadorian footballer
- Marlon Pack (born 1991), English footballer
- Marlon López (born 1992), Nicaraguan footballer
- Marlon Duran (born 1992), American soccer player
- Marlon Bruno Mariano de Souza (born 1993), Brazilian footballer
- Marlón Cornejo (born 1993), Salvadoran footballer
- Marlon Sequen (born 1993), Guatemalan footballer
- Marlon Ramírez (born 1993), Honduran footballer
- Marlinho (born 1994), Brazilian footballer
- Marlon Ritter (born 1994), German footballer
- Marlon Sierra (born 1994), Colombian footballer
- Marlon Hairston (born 1994), American professional soccer player
- Marlon (footballer, born April 1995), Brazilian footballer
- Marlon (footballer, born September 1995), Brazilian footballer
- Marlon Costa (born 1995), Portuguese footballer
- Marlon Freitas (born 1995), Brazilian footballer
- Marlon Frey (born 1996), German footballer
- Marlon Rangel (born 1996), Brazilian footballer
- Marlon Douglas de Sales Silva (born 1997), Brazilian football winger
- Marlon Martins (born 1997), Brazilian football forward
- Marlon Xavier (born 1997), Brazilian footballer
- Marlon Evans (born 1997), Guamanian footballer
- Marlon Versteeg (born 1997), Dutch footballer
- Marlon Vargas (born 2001), American soccer player
- Marlon Yan Cavalcanti da Silva (born 2005), Brazilian footballer

==== Other sports ====
- Marlon Acácio (born 1982), Mozambican judoka
- Marlon Anderson (born 1974), American baseball player
- Marlon Pérez Arango (born 1976), Colombian cyclist
- Marlon Barnes (born 1976), American football player
- Marlon Black (born 1975), West Indian cricketer
- Marlon Brown (born 1991), American football player
- Marlon Brutus (born 1980), Sint Maartener cricketer
- Marlon Bryan (born 1986), Caymanese cricketer
- Marlon Byrd (born 1977), American baseball player
- Marlon Davidson (born 1998), American football player
- Marlon Davis (American football) (born 1986), American football player
- Marlon Devonish (born 1976), English sprinter
- Marlon Favorite (born 1986), American football player
- Marlon Fluonia (born 1964), Dutch baseball player
- Marlon Forbes (born 1971), American football player
- Marlon Gaillard (born 1996), French cyclist
- Marlon Garnett (born 1975), Belizean basketball player
- Marlon González (born 1989), Colombian footballer
- Marlon Grings (born 1975), Brazilian slalom canoer
- Marlon Humphrey (born 1996), American football player
- Marlon Jansen (born 1980), South African cricket umpire
- Marlon Kerner (born 1973), American football player
- Marlon Lewis (born 1987), South African rugby union player
- Marlon Lucky (born 1986), American football player
- Marlon Mack (born 1996), American football player
- Marlon Mallawarachchi (born 1966), Sri Lankan cricketer
- Marlon Manalo (born 1975), Filipino pool player
- Marlon Maxey (born 1969), American basketball player
- Marlon McCree (born 1977), American football player
- Marlon Medina (born 1985), Nicaraguan footballer
- Marlon Moore (born 1987), American National Football League player
- Marlon Moraes (born 1988), Brazilian mixed martial artist
- Marlon Motlop (born 1990), Australian rules footballer and musician
- Márlon Paniagua (born 1974), Guatemalan cyclist
- Marlon Parmer (born 1980), American basketball player
- Marlon Ramsey (born 1974), American sprinter
- Marlon Redmond (born 1955), American basketball player
- Marlon Reid (born 1982), English boxer
- Marlon Richards (born 1989), Trinidadian cricketer
- Marlon Samuels (born 1981), Jamaican cricketer
- Marlon Singh (born 1963), US Virgin Islands sailor
- Marlon Smith (born 1989), American football player
- Marlon St. Julien (born 1972), American equestrian
- Marlon Starling (born 1959), American professional boxer
- Marlon Stöckinger (born 1991), Filipino race car driver
- Marlon Tapales (born 1992), Filipino boxer
- Marlon Tuipulotu (born 1999), American football player
- Marlon Vera (fighter) (born 1992), Ecuadorian mixed martial artist
- Marlon Vonhagt (born 1965), Sri Lankan cricketer
- Marlon Williams (athlete) (born 1956), US Virgin Islands long-distance runner
- Marlon Muraguti Yared (born 1977), Brazilian volleyball player

=== Other people ===
- Marlon Green (1929–2009), American commercial pilot, first African-American pilot for a major airline
- Marlon Blackwell (born 1956), American architect and professor
- Marlon Jones (born 1970–1980), Jamaican criminal
- Marlon Dumas (born 1975), Honduran computer scientist
- Marlon Legere (born 1975), American cop killer
- Marlon Parker, South African entrepreneur
- Marlon Bailey, American professor

== Fictional characters ==
- Marlon Bain, in the 1996 novel Infinite Jest
- Marlon Dingle, on the British soap opera Emmerdale
- Marlon, a character in The Perishers cartoon strip.

== Pets ==
- Marlon Bundo, a rabbit belonging to the family of Vice President of the United States Mike Pence

== See also ==
- Marlon Santos (disambiguation)
- Marlon (TV series), American television series from 2017 to 2018
