= Schwantes =

Schwantes is a surname. Notable people with the surname include:

- Athos Schwantes (born 1985), Brazilian fencer;
- Marlon Schwantes (born 1984), Brazilian footballer;
- Martin Heinrich Gustav Schwantes (1891–1960), German archaeologist and botanist.
