= Kevin Garcia (soccer, born 1990) =

American soccer player (born 1990)

Personal information
- Date of birth: August 21, 1990 (age 36)
- Place of birth: Queens, New York, U.S.
- Height: 1.88 m (6 ft 2 in)
- Position: Defender

College career
Years	Team	Apps	(Gls)
2008–2011	Villanova Wildcats	77	(6)

Senior career*
Years	Team	Apps	(Gls)
2010–2013	Long Island Rough Riders	34	(1)
2013–2014	IFK Luleå	30	(2)
2015	Galway United	11	(0)
2015	Västerås SK	11	(0)
2016	Rio Grande Valley FC	25	(1)
2016–2019	Houston Dynamo	30	(1)
2016–2019	→ Rio Grande Valley FC (loan)	15	(0)
2020–2021	FC Tulsa	40	(1)
- * Club domestic league appearances and goals as of November 5, 2021

Kevin Garcia (born August 21, 1990) is an American retired soccer player who played as a defender.

== Career ==
=== Youth and college ===
Garcia played his high school soccer at St. Francis Prep in Fresh Meadows Queens, where he won the NYC Championship in his junior year. Was named NYC player of the year by NY Newsday. Kevin was elected to the all-city team sophomore, junior and senior year. Garcia played four years of college soccer for the Villanova University Wildcats between 2008 and 2011.

Garcia also appeared for Premier Development League side Long Island Rough Riders between 2010 and 2013.

=== MLS Draft ===
On January 17, 2012, Garcia was drafted 41st overall in the 2012 MLS Supplemental Draft by New England Revolution. However, he didn't sign with the club.

=== IFK Luleå ===
Garcia joined Swedish club IFK Luleå in July 2013. He made his debut for IFK Luleå on August 25 in a 2–0 loss in a Division 1 match against Sirius. Garcia would go on to make 9 appearances in his first season in Sweden as IFK Luleå finished 5th in the Norra division.

On August 5, 2014, Garcia scored his first goal for IFK Luleå in a Svenska Cupen match with Sandviks IK. Trailing 2–1 late, Garcia scored in the 90th minute to level the score at 2 and send the game to extra time, where IFK Luleå would go on to win. On August 10, Garcia would play late hero once again, this time in the league. Garcia managed to score his first league goal in the 82nd minute to give IFK Luleå a 2–1 win over IF Sylvia. Overall, Garcia enjoyed a more successful season in 2014, making 23 appearances and scoring 3 goals in all competitions, but it was a worse season for the club, dropping to 10th in the Norra table.

=== Galway United ===
On March 23, 2015, Garcia signed with Irish club Galway United. He made his debut for the Tribesmen on March 24 in a 2–0 loss to Cork City. After making 13 appearances for Galway United, Garcia was released on July 30, 2015.

=== Västerås SK ===
On August 3, 2015, Garcia returned to Sweden to sign with Division 1 club Västerås SK Fotboll. He made his Västerås SK debut on August 20 in a Svenska Cupen match with AFC Eskilstuna, a 3–3 match that saw Eskilstuna advance on penalties. Garcia made his league debut for Västerås SK on August 23 in a 3–2 win over Nyköpings BIS. He ended the season with 12 appearances across all competitions as Västerås SK finished 10th in the Norra division.

=== Rio Grande Valley FC ===
Garcia joined new United Soccer League side Rio Grande Valley FC Toros on January 29, 2016. Garcia made his Toros debut on March 26 in a 2–0 win over the Tulsa Roughnecks. He scored his first goal for RGVFC on June 4 to give the Toros a 1–0 win over San Antonio FC. Garcia captained the Toros to a 10–game unbeaten run, allowing 1 goal in that span and keeping a 760-minute shutout streak.

=== Houston Dynamo ===
On September 6, 2016, Garcia was rewarded for his strong play by signing a contract with the Toros' MLS affiliate, the Houston Dynamo. He would make the bench for 2 games, but would end up back with RGVFC on loan for the rest of the year, helping the Toros reach the playoffs, where they lost in the first round 3–2 to the Oklahoma City Energy.

Garcia made his MLS and Dynamo debut on April 15, 2017, in a 2–2 draw with Minnesota United FC. Garcia made 5 total appearances for the Dynamo during the 2017 season, spending the rest of the season on the bench for the Dynamo or on loan with the Toros.

In 2018, Garcia missed two months due to a muscle injury. He made 4 appearances in the US Open Cup, including coming on as a sub in the final, to help the Dynamo win their first ever Open Cup. Garcia scored his first MLS goal on October 21 in a 3–2 loss to Seattle Sounders FC. He made 15 appearances and scored 1 goal in MLS play as the Dynamo finished 9th in the Western Conference, failing to qualify for the playoffs.

Garcia made his first appearance of 2019 on March 2, getting the start in a 1–1 draw with Real Salt Lake in the first league match of the season. He made his first appearance in a continental competition of his career on March 12, coming on as a sub in a 1–0 loss to Tigres in the CONCACAF Champions League quarter-finals. Garcia made 16 appearances across all competitions for the Dynamo, 12 of them coming in MLS as Houston finished 10th in the West to miss the playoffs again. He also made 2 appearances for the Toros in April. His contract with Houston expired following the 2019 season.

=== FC Tulsa ===
On March 3, 2020, Garcia joined USL Championship side FC Tulsa ahead of the 2020 season. He made his debut for Tulsa on March 7, playing the full 90 minutes in a 1–1 draw with Sacramento Republic. In a shortened season due to the COVID-19 pandemic, Garcia started all 15 games for Tulsa, playing every minute to help them reach the playoffs for the first time since 2017. Tulsa fell in the first round of the playoffs 4–2 on penalties to El Paso Locomotive, with Garica playing the full 120 minutes of the match. On December 17, Garcia re-signed with Tulsa for the 2021 season.

Garcia scored his first goal for Tulsa on October 20, 2021, in a 4–0 win over Atlanta United 2. He ended the season with 25 appearances and 1 goal to help Tulsa qualify for the playoffs, however he did not appear in their playoff game, a 6–2 loss to the Tampa Bay Rowdies.

Following the 2021 season, Garcia announced his retirement.

== Personal life ==
Garcia has Colombian heritage.

== Career statistics ==
As of March 15, 2022

Appearances and goals by club, season and competition
Club	Season	League			National cup (Note: Includes Svenska Cupen, League of Ireland Cup, and U.S. Open Cup)		League cup (Note: Includes USL Playoffs and MLS Cup Playoffs)		Continental		Total	
Club	Season	Division	Apps	Goals	Apps	Goals	Apps	Goals	Apps	Goals	Apps	Goals
IFK Luleå	2013	Division 1	9	0	0	0	—		—		9	0
IFK Luleå	2014	Division 1	21	2	2	1	—		—		23	3
IFK Luleå	Total		30	2	2	1	0	0	0	0	32	3
Galway United	2015	League of Ireland Premier Division	11	0	2	0	—		—		13	0
Västerås SK	2015	Division 1	11	0	1	0	—		—		12	0
Rio Grande Valley FC	2016	USL	25	1	—		—		—		25	1
Rio Grande Valley FC (loan)	2016	USL	4	0	—		1	0	—		5	0
Rio Grande Valley FC (loan)	2017	USL	9	0	—		—		—		9	0
Rio Grande Valley FC (loan)	2019	USLC	2	0	—		—		—		2	0
Rio Grande Valley FC (loan)	Total		40	1	0	0	1	0	0	0	41	0
Houston Dynamo	2016	MLS	0	0	0	0	—		—		0	0
Houston Dynamo	2017	MLS	3	0	2	0	0	0	—		5	0
Houston Dynamo	2018	MLS	15	1	4	0	—		—		19	1
Houston Dynamo	2019	MLS	12	0	2	0	—		2 (Note: One appearances in CONCACAF Champions League, one appearance in Leagues Cup)	0	16	0
Houston Dynamo	Total		30	1	8	0	0	0	2	0	40	1
FC Tulsa	2020	USLC	15	0	—		1	0	—		16	0
FC Tulsa	2021	USLC	25	1	—		0	0	—		25	1
FC Tulsa	Total		40	1	0	0	0	0	0	0	41	1
Career total			162	5	13	1	2	0	2	0	179	6

== Honors ==
Houston Dynamo

- US Open Cup: 2018
