= Marlon Santos =

Marlon Santos may refer to:

- Marlon dos Santos Prazeres (born 1995), Brazilian football forward
- Marlon Santos da Silva Barbosa (born 1995), Brazilian football defender
- Marlon Santos Teodoro (born 2005), Brazilian football forward

== See also ==
- Marlon
