= 2017 Houston Dynamo season =

Houston Dynamo
2017 season
- Owner: Gabriel Brenner
- President: Chris Canetti
- Coach: Wilmer Cabrera
- Stadium: BBVA Compass Stadium
- MLS: 4th, West; 10th, Overall
- U.S. Open Cup: Round of 16
- MLS Cup playoffs: Western Conference Finals
- Top goalscorer: League: Erick Torres (14 goals); All: Erick Torres (14 goals)
- Highest home attendance: 22,115 vs FC Dallas (June 23)
- Lowest home attendance: 14,148 vs Real Salt Lake (June 3)
- Average home league attendance: 17,623
Home colors	Away colors

The 2017 Houston Dynamo season was the club's 12th season of existence since joining Major League Soccer for the 2006 season. The club's had misse the MLS Cup Playoffs for three consecutive seasons.

It is the team's first year under the leadership of head coach Wilmer Cabrera and third season under general manager Matt Jordan. On the front office end, it is Gabriel Brener's second season as majority owner and Chris Canetti's seventh as the club president.

== Month by month review ==
=== Preseason ===
I am excited to join the Houston Dynamo. It’s a great club with a great history, and I am ready for the challenge. I look forward to working with the ownership group, management, our staff and the players to return the Dynamo to the level that the club and our fans deserve and expect.

— Wilmer Cabrera, October 28, 2016.

Five days after the end of the 2016 regular season, the Houston Dynamo appointed Wilmer Cabrera as the fourth head coach in club history. Cabrera was promoted from the club's lower league affiliate Rio Grande Valley FC Toros where served as the head coach for the 2015 USL season.

Cabrera took over for interim head coach Wade Barrett – the only other reported candidate for the job – and a team that had missed the MLS Cup Playoffs for the third consecutive season. The Dynamo job is the Colombian tactician's second head coaching responsibility in Major League Soccer and one that reunites him with Erick "Cubo" Torres, a former pupil of Cabrera's at the defunct Chivas USA.

=== March ===
The Houston Dynamo opened the season at home with a 2–1 victory over the defending MLS Cup Champion Seattle Sounders FC, on a night when Erick Torres and Romell Quioto scored their first goals for the club. Torres and Quioto would score in a second consecutive match the following week, coupled with Alberth Elis' first goal in a Dynamo shirt, as the team collected 3–1 win over Columbus Crew SC.

The 2–0–0 start was the third time the club began the season with two wins and a Portland Timbers with the same record set up for an early season matchup between top three teams. Torres and Quioto scored in Portland to give the Dynamo a 2–1 lead at halftime, becoming the seventh and eight players in club history to score in three consecutive matches. However, three unanswered goals in the second half by the Timbers would end in the Dynamo's first loss of the season.

Position in the MLS Western Conference at the end of March

Pos	Team	Pld	W	D	L	GF	GA	GD	Pts
3	Houston Dynamo	3	2	0	1	7	6	+1	6

=== April ===
The Dynamo began the month of April with a 4–1 win over the New York Red Bulls, a match where Erick Torres scored his first hat-trick with the club. Dylan Remick scored the equalizer in the 14th minute against the Red Bulls, becoming the first non-forward to score in 2017.

The second weekend in April, the team traveled to the New England Revolution in search of their first point on the road. The Dynamo lost 2–0, dropping to 0–2–0 away, as homegrown Memo Rodriguez made his MLS debut. Goalkeeper Tyler Deric would be benched after his performance against the Revs, giving Joe Willis his first start of the season.

Houston and Minnesota United FC faced off for the first time ever in Major League Soccer as the expansion side took a point in Space City. The Dynamo led at the half thanks to Mauro Manotas and Elis before the Loons would score two of their own to draw. Needing to respond after winning only one of their previous four matches, the Dynamo outlasted the visiting San Jose Earthquakes 2–0 in a nationally televised afternoon game on UniMás.

The Dynamo traveled to Toronto FC for their first midweek match of the season that ended in a 2–0 loss at the feet of a Jozy Altidore brace. The team recorded two wins, two losses and a draw and a goal differential of +1 in the month of April.

Position in the MLS Western Conference at the end of April

Pos	Team	Pld	W	D	L	GF	GA	GD	Pts
3	Houston Dynamo	8	4	1	3	15	13	+2	13

=== May ===
The Houston Dynamo would begin another month with a blowout at home, this time collecting the second shutout of the season in a 4–0 win against Orlando City SC. Manotas scored a brace against Orlando as Elis and Quioto each found the back of the net once more. After missing the game versus Orlando due to concussion protocol, Torres returned to the starting lineup and scored the game-winning goal against Vancouver Whitecaps FC.

The road woes would continue, however, as the Dynamo only collected a point as they played three consecutive away matches in the span of 12 days. The Dynamo lost 2–0 at Philadelphia Union, lost 4–1 at Atlanta United FC and played to a scoreless draw at FC Dallas. Tyler Deric returned to the starting lineup in the Texas Derby match, ending Willis' run of seven straight matches in goal.

The Dynamo would end the month with their fourth match in 15 days, keeping their home record free of losses after a 5–1 win over Real Salt Lake. The five goals matched the club record for goals in a game and give the club a +4 goal differential for the month of May.

Position in the MLS Western Conference at the end of May

Pos	Team	Pld	W	D	L	GF	GA	GD	Pts
1	Houston Dynamo	14	7	2	5	27	21	+6	23

=== June ===
After managing to pick up their first point on the road a week before, the Dynamo lost yet another game on the road as they fell 1–0 to the Seattle Sounders. This time the damage came from a familiar face, the club's second all-time scorer Will Bruin. The team took a few days off as they did not have a match the following week due to a FIFA international break.

The Dynamo entered the 2017 edition of the U.S. Open Cup in the fourth round against North Carolina FC. Given that this match was on the east coast and the team had a league match on the west coast a few days later, Wilmer Cabrera featured a majority of young players in the 3–2 extra time win over NCFC. Memo Rodriguez scored the game winner, his first with the Dynamo, to help the team advance to the round of 16. Three days later, the team almost picked up their first win on the road before a Romain Alessandrini goal drew the LA Galaxy level in the closing moments of the match.

Two rivalry matches would end the month for the Dynamo, the first being another draw with FC Dallas. In this latest instance, Torres and Maximiliano Urruti traded goals to end the match 1–1 in the second Texas Derby match of the season. A reserve-heavy Dynamo would then lose 2–0 to a Sporting Kansas City side that featured many of their regulars, bowing out of the U.S. Open Cup.

Position in the MLS Western Conference at the end of June

Pos	Team	Pld	W	D	L	GF	GA	GD	Pts
2	Houston Dynamo	17	7	4	6	30	25	+5	25

=== July ===
The Dynamo started the month of July on opposite ends of a 3–1 scoreline. They lost their seventh match on the road at the Colorado Rapids, a match in which they went into the half tied at one-a-piece. The team then dismantled a Piatti-less Montreal Impact at home, heading into a two-week break in league play due to the 2017 CONCACAF Gold Cup group stage.

=== August ===
The Dynamo had an up-and-down August, that was ultimately cut short by Hurricane Harvey. They opened the month with a scoreless draw away against Real Salt Lake. The Dynamo, led by a goal and assist from Vicente Sanchez, then crushed the San Jose Earthquakes at home. A 2–1 loss away to Vancouver and an exciting 3–3 draw in Dallas rounded out the month. With the third draw of the season in Dallas, the Dynamo solidified their hold over El Capitan.

=== September ===
The Post-Harvey blues were very much real for the Houston Dynamo, as they opened September with their first home loss of the season. A 1–0 defeat to the Colorado Rapids, who had been win-less away from home previously. Another 1–0 loss followed, this time at San Jose. The Dynamo got their first points of the month in a 1–1 draw against NYCFC, in a strange game that was hosted in Connecticut. The Dynamo closed the month with an exciting, yet disappointing 3–3 draw at home against the LA Galaxy. This draw continued the team's strange inability to gain points from teams at the bottom of the Western Conference. The Dynamo finished the month on a high note with an important 2–1 home victory over Minnesota United. Vicente Sanchez continued to showcase his value to the team throughout the month, despite his age as he racked up 4 assists during the month. New DP Tomás Martínez also started to settle in with the team, as he scored his first goal of the season against the Galaxy.

=== October ===
October proved to be a great month for the Men in Orange. A big 2–1 win at home against Sporting KC, followed by a gutsy 0–0 draw at Sporting clinched the first Houston Dynamo playoff appearance since 2013. The Dynamo finished off their regular season with a big 3–0 win over the Chicago Fire. That win, along with a Kansas City loss clinched 4th place in the West for the Dynamo. Right Back A.J. DeLagarza tore his ACL in the early minutes of the game, a crucial knock on the Dynamo's playoff hopes.

The Dynamo took on Sporting Kansas City in the Knockout Round of the 2017 MLS Playoffs, the third match between the team in four games. The Dynamo would win that game 1-0 off an Alberth Elis goal in Extra Time and advanced to play the Portland Timbers in the Conference Semifinals. The first leg was a dire 0–0 draw, with neither team threatening much. While the Dynamo had an all-around great October, one of their players had a much more rocky month. GK Tyler Deric won MLS Player of the Month honors on October 27, but was also arrested on assault charges. Deric would miss the remaining games in the Dynamo's season.

== Current squad ==
As of match plated October 15, 2017

No.	Name	Nationality	Position	Date of birth (age)	Signed from	Signed in	Contract ends	Apps.	Goals
Goalkeepers
1	Tyler Deric (HGP)	(United States)	GK	30 August 1988 (age 38)	North Carolina Tar Heels	2009		95	0
24	Calle Brown	(United States)	GK	1 July 1992 (age 34)	Pittsburgh Riverhounds	2016		0	0
31	Joe Willis	(United States)	GK	10 August 1988 (age 38)	D.C. United	2015		45	0
Defenders
2	Jalil Anibaba	(United States)	DF	19 October 1988 (age 37)	Sporting Kansas City	2016		42	0
3	Adolfo Machado	(Panama)	DF	14 February 1985 (age 41)	Saprissa	2017		33	0
4	Philippe Senderos	(Switzerland)	DF	14 February 1985 (age 41)	Rangers	2017		2	0
7	DaMarcus Beasley	(United States)	MF	25 May 1982 (age 44)	Puebla	2014		87	2
15	Dylan Remick	(United States)	DF	19 May 1991 (age 35)	Seattle Sounders FC	2017		16	2
16	Kevin Garcia	(United States)	DF	21 August 1990 (age 36)	Rio Grande Valley	2016		5	0
20	A. J. DeLaGarza	(Guam)	DF	4 November 1987 (age 38)	LA Galaxy	2017		30	0
21	George Malki	(United States)	DF	21 April 1992 (age 34)	Rio Grande Valley	2017		0	0
22	Leonardo	(Brazil)	DF	5 February 1988 (age 38)	LA Galaxy	2017		30	2
26	Taylor Hunter	(United States)	DF	3 July 1993 (age 33)	Rio Grande Valley	2017		2	0
Midfielders
5	Juan David Cabezas	(Colombia)	MF	27 February 1991 (age 35)	loan Deportivo Cali	2017		27	1
6	Eric Alexander	(United States)	MF	14 April 1988 (age 38)	Montreal Impact	2016		22	0
8	Joseph Holland	(England)	MF	21 April 1993 (age 33)	Ventura County Fusion	2017		7	0
10	Vicente Sánchez	(Uruguay)	MF	7 December 1979 (age 46)	Defensor Sporting	2017		23	2
13	Ricardo Clark	(United States)	MF	10 February 1983 (age 43)	Eintracht Frankfurt	2017		172	23
14	Alex	(Brazil)	MF	15 December 1988 (age 37)	Chicago Fire	2015		83	11
18	Memo Rodríguez (HGP)	(United States)	MF	27 December 1995 (age 30)	Rio Grande Valley	2017		12	2
23	José Escalante	(Honduras)	MF	29 May 1995 (age 31)	loan from Olimpia	2017		7	0
25	Tomás Martínez (DP)	(Argentina)	MF	7 March 1995 (age 31)	Braga	2017		9	2
27	Boniek García	(Honduras)	MF	4 September 1984 (age 42)	Olimpia	2012		161	15
28	Charlie Ward	(England)	MF	19 February 1995 (age 31)	Rio Grande Valley	2017		3	0
29	Christian Lucatero (HGP)	(United States)	MF	17 June 1997 (age 29)	Youth team	2017		0	0
Forwards
9	Erick Torres Padilla	(Mexico)	ST	19 January 1993 (age 33)	Guadalajara	2015		50	14
11	Andrew Wenger	(United States)	ST	25 December 1990 (age 35)	Philadelphia Union	2016		58	8
12	Romell Quioto	(Honduras)	ST	9 August 1991 (age 35)	CD Olimpia	2017		22	7
17	Alberth Elis (DP)	(Honduras)	ST	12 February 1996 (age 30)	loan from Monterrey	2017		26	10
19	Mauro Manotas	(Colombia)	ST	15 July 1995 (age 31)	Uniautónoma	2015		70	20
Players eligible from Rio Grande Valley
35	Eric Bird	(United States)	MF	8 April 1993 (age 33)	Philadelphia Union	2017		2	0
38	Kai Greene	(United States)	DF	7 July 1993 (age 33)	Seton Hall Pirates	2017		0	0
39	Rubén Luna	(Mexico)	ST	2 October 1992 (age 33)	Inter Playa del Carmen	2017		2	0
41	Jorginho James	(Jamaica)	MF	7 July 1994 (age 32)	loan from Harbour View	2017		1	0
42	Kyle Murphy	(United States)	ST	11 December 1992 (age 33)	Clemson Tigers	2017		0	0
Left during the season
4	Agus	(Spain)	Defender	3 May 1985 (age 41)	Albacete	2016		11	0

== Coaching staff ==
Position	Staff
Head Coach	(Colombia) Wilmer Cabrera
Goalkeeper coach	(England) Paul Rogers
Sports Performance Director/Fitness Coach	(Republic of Ireland) Paul Caffrey
Performance Analyst	(England) Oliver Gage
General Manager/Vice President	(United States) Matt Jordan
Assistant General Manager/Director of Soccer Operations	(United States) Nick Kowba
Equipment Manager	Chris Maxwell
Asst. Equipment Manager	Eddie Cerda
Director of Sports Medicine/Head Athletic Trainer	(United States) Theron Enns
Assistant Athletic Trainer	(United States) Rory Blevins
Head Team Physician	(United States) Timothy C. Sitter, MD
Primary Care Physician	(United States) David A. Braunreiter, MD
Director, Youth Development/Academy Director	(England) James Clarkson
Soccer Programs Manager	(England) Adrian Moses
Center of Excellence Manager	(United States) Justin Neese

Last updated: July 24, 2016
Source: Houston Dynamo

== Player movement ==
=== In ===
Per Major League Soccer and club policies terms of the deals do not get disclosed.

Date	Player	Position	Previous club	Notes	Ref
December 16, 2016	(United States) Dylan Remick	DF	(United States) Seattle Sounders FC	Trade	
December 21, 2016	(Panama) Adolfo Machado	DF	(Costa Rica) Saprissa	Undisclosed	
January 4, 2017	(Brazil) Leonardo	DF	(United States) LA Galaxy	Re-Entry Draft	
December 23, 2016	(Honduras) Romell Quioto	FW	(Honduras) Olimpia	Undisclosed	
January 13, 2017	(Guam) AJ DeLaGarza	DF	(United States) LA Galaxy	Trade	
January 24, 2017	(Uruguay) Vicente Sánchez	FW	(Uruguay) Defensor Sporting	Free Agent	
July 17, 2017	(Argentina) Tomas Martinez	MF	(Portugal) Braga	Transfer	
August 7, 2017	(Switzerland) Philippe Senderos	DF	(Scotland) Rangers	Free Agent	

=== Out ===
Date	Player	Position	Destination Club	Notes	Ref
December 13, 2016	(United States) Collen Warner	MF	(United States) Minnesota United FC	Expansion Draft	
December 13, 2016	(United States) Sheanon Williams	DF	(Canada) Vancouver Whitecaps	Trade	
December 23, 2016	(United States) Will Bruin	FW	(United States) Seattle Sounders FC	Trade	
January 26, 2017	(United States) David Horst	DF	(United States) Real Salt Lake	Free Agent	
June 9, 2017	(Spain) Agus	DF	(Denmark) Esbjerg	Waived	

=== Loans ===
Per Major League Soccer and club policies terms of the deals do not get disclosed.

==== In ====
Date	Player	Position	Loaned from	Notes	Ref
December 20, 2016	(Honduras) Alberth Elis	FW	(Mexico) Monterrey	Designated Player	
December 30, 2016	(Colombia) Juan David Cabezas	MF	(Colombia) Deportivo Cali		
January 20, 2016	(Honduras) Jose Escalante	MF	(Honduras) Olimpia		

== Friendlies ==
February 4 Scrimmage	UTRGV Vaqueros	0–5	Houston Dynamo	Edinburg, Texas
CDT		Report	Manotas 12'; Alex 23'; Torres 50', 59'; Agus 51'; Anibaba (yellow card) ?'	Stadium: H-E-B Park Practice Field; Referee: Gregorio Garza
Note: Two 30-minute halves.

February 4 Scrimmage	Rio Grande Valley FC Toros	1–2	Houston Dynamo	Edinburg, Texas
CDT	Luquetta 43'	Report	Rodriguez 39'; Lucatero 45' (pen.)	Stadium: H-E-B Park Practice Field; Referee: Gregorio Garza
Note: 45-minute match.

February 7 Scrimmage	Houston Dynamo Gray	1–0	Houston Dynamo Yellow	Edinburg, Texas
CDT	Torres 23'	Report		Stadium: H-E-B Park Practice Field; Referee: Rosendo Mendoza
Note: 45-minute intra-squad match.

February 7 Scrimmage	Rio Grande Valley FC Toros	0–3	Houston Dynamo	Edinburg, Texas
CDT		Report	Manotas 21' (pen.), 35'; Elis 30'	Stadium: H-E-B Park Practice Field; Referee: Rosendo Mendoza
Note: 45-minute match.

February 11 Scrimmage	Houston Dynamo Gray	1–1	Houston Dynamo Yellow	Houston, Texas
CDT	DeLaGarza 60'	Report	Torres 51'	Stadium: Houston Sports Park
Note: 65 minute intra-squad match. First half was 45 minutes, second half was 20 minutes.

February 11 Scrimmage	Houston Dynamo	5–0	Houston Baptist Huskies	Houston, Texas
CDT	Casner (o.g.); García; Luna; Hunter	Report		Stadium: Houston Sports Park
Note: 70 minute match.

February 15 DDC	Houston Dynamo	2–0	New England Revolution	Tucson, Arizona
	Torres 54'; Cabezas (yellow card) 60'; Elis 89'	Report	J. Smith (yellow card) 22'	Stadium: Kino Sports Complex; Referee: Baboucarr Jallow

February 18 DDC	Houston Dynamo	3–1	New York City FC	Tucson, Arizona
	Quioto 2'; Cabezas (yellow card) 30'; Leonardo (yellow card) 30'; Alex 50'; Rodriguez 89'	Report	Villa 15', (red card) 38'; Sweat (yellow card) 44'; Gomez (yellow card) 69'	Stadium: Kino Sports Complex; Referee: Nima Saghafi

February 22 DDC	Houston Dynamo	2–2	New York Red Bulls	Tucson, Arizona
	Manotas 34'; Anibaba 41'	Report	Nason (yellow card) 39'; Fernandez 65'; Terci 72'	Stadium: Kino Sports Complex; Referee: Chris Penso

February 25 DDC	Colorado Rapids	0–2	Houston Dynamo	Tucson, Arizona
CDT	Sjöberg (yellow card) 44'; Burch (yellow card) 84'	Report	Quioto 43', 67'; Alberth Elis (yellow card) 61'	Stadium: Kino North Stadium; Referee: Baldomero Toledo

October 5 BBVA Compass Dynamo Charities Cup	Houston Dynamo	3–5	Cruz Azul	Houston, Texas
CDT	Sánchez 10'; Manotas 48'; Remick 86'	Report	Méndez 15'; Cauteruccio 23'; Faurlín 57'; Silva 69'; Mora 85'	Stadium: BBVA Compass Stadium; Attendance: 12,102; Referee: Kyle Phillips

== Competitions ==
=== Major League Soccer ===
==== Conference table ====
Pos	Team	Pld	W	L	T	GF	GA	GD	Pts	Qualification
1	Portland Timbers	34	15	11	8	60	50	+10	53	MLS Cup Conference Semifinals
2	Seattle Sounders FC	34	14	9	11	52	39	+13	53	MLS Cup Conference Semifinals
3	Vancouver Whitecaps FC	34	15	12	7	50	49	+1	52	MLS Cup Knockout Round
4	Houston Dynamo	34	13	10	11	57	45	+12	50	MLS Cup Knockout Round
5	Sporting Kansas City	34	12	9	13	40	29	+11	49	MLS Cup Knockout Round
6	San Jose Earthquakes	34	13	14	7	39	60	−21	46	MLS Cup Knockout Round
7	FC Dallas	34	11	10	13	48	48	0	46	
8	Real Salt Lake	34	13	15	6	48	56	−8	45	
9	Minnesota United FC	34	10	18	6	47	70	−23	36	
10	Colorado Rapids	34	9	19	6	31	51	−20	33	
11	LA Galaxy	34	8	18	8	45	67	−22	32	

Source: MLS

==== Matches ====
March 4, 2017 1	Houston Dynamo	2–1	Seattle Sounders FC	Houston
19:30 (CST)	E.Torres 20' (yellow card) 81'; Quioto 42'	Report; Boxscore	Marshall (yellow card) 33'; Dempsey 58'; R.Torres (yellow card) 67'	Stadium: BBVA Compass Stadium; Attendance: 20,758

March 11, 2017 2	Houston Dynamo	3–1	Columbus Crew	Houston
19:30 (CST)	Quioto 2'; Elis 35' (yellow card) 68'; E.Torres 65'	Report; Boxscore	Finlay (yellow card) 59'; Raitala (yellow card) 72'; Mensah (red card) 87'; Kamara 90+3'	Stadium: BBVA Compass Stadium; Attendance: 16,486

March 18, 2017 3	Portland Timbers	4–2	Houston Dynamo	Portland
21:30 (CDT)	Valeri 10' (pen.), 58'; Guzmán (yellow card) 20' (goal) 66'; Miller (yellow card) 32'; Blanco (yellow card) 37'; Chara (yellow card) 37'; Nagbe (yellow card) 76'; Adi 88'	Report; Boxscore	E.Torres 38' (pen.) (yellow card) 39'; Quioto 45+2'	Stadium: Providence Park; Attendance: 21,144

April 1, 2017 4	Houston Dynamo	4–1	New York Red Bulls	Houston
19:30 (CDT)	Remick 14' (yellow card) 70'; E.Torres 42' (pen.), 56', 90+1' (yellow card) 87'	Report; Boxscore	Wright-Phillips 13'; Lade (yellow card) 28'; Adams (yellow card) 44'	Stadium: BBVA Compass Stadium; Attendance: 17,914

April 8, 2017 5	New England Revolution	2–0	Houston Dynamo	Foxborough
13:00 (CDT)	Kamara 52'; Agudelo 72'	Report	Clark (yellow card) 16'	Stadium: Gillette Stadium; Attendance: 14,725

April 15, 2017 6	Houston Dynamo	2–2	Minnesota United FC	Houston
19:30 (CDT)	Manotas 14'; Elis 43'	Report	Thiesson (yellow card) 35'; Ramirez 47'; Venegas 59'; Kallman (yellow card) 86'; Johan Venegas (yellow card) 90+4'	Stadium: BBVA Compass Stadium; Attendance: 16,125

April 22, 2017 7	Houston Dynamo	2–0	San Jose Earthquakes	Houston
14:55 (CDT)	E.Torres 9' (pen.); Willis (yellow card) 32'; Elis 72' (yellow card) 34'; Quioto (yellow card) 90+4'	Report	Jungwirth (yellow card) 35'; Francis (yellow card) 46'	Stadium: BBVA Compass Stadium; Attendance: 16,918

April 28, 2017 8	Toronto FC	2–0	Houston Dynamo	Toronto
18:30 (CDT)	Jozy Altidore 16', 32'	Report	Elis (yellow card) 58'; Cabezas (yellow card) 70'	Stadium: BMO Field; Attendance: 25,258

May 6, 2017 9	Houston Dynamo	4–0	Orlando City SC	Houston
19:30 (CDT)	Elis 23'; Manotas 65'; DeLaGarza (yellow card) 60'; Quioto 75' (yellow card) 45+3'; Machado (yellow card) 84'	Report	Toia (yellow card) 79'	Stadium: BBVA Compass Stadium; Attendance: 16,918

May 12, 2017 10	Houston Dynamo	2–1	Vancouver Whitecaps FC	Houston
20:00 (CDT)	Elis 15'; Machado (yellow card) 21'; Manotas (yellow card) 61'; E.Torres 68' (pen.); DeLaGarza (yellow card) 90+2'	Report	Laba (yellow card) 39'; Waston (yellow card) 67'; Shea 85'	Stadium: BBVA Compass Stadium; Attendance: 16,975

May 17, 2017 11	Philadelphia Union	2–0	Houston Dynamo	Chester
18:30 (CDT)	Picault 17'; Ilsinho 38'; Gaddis (yellow card) 47'; Rosenberry (yellow card) 83'	Report	Quioto (yellow card) 39'; Leonardo (yellow card) 39'; Cabezas (yellow card) 48'	Stadium: Talen Energy Stadium; Attendance: 15,234

May 20, 2017 12	Atlanta United FC	4–1	Houston Dynamo	Atlanta
18:00 (CDT)	Almiron 30', 42', 80' (pen.); Garza (yellow card) 51'; Gressel 76'	Report	DeLaGarza (yellow card) 54'; Machado (yellow card) 59'; E.Torres 90' (pen.)	Stadium: Bobby Dodd Stadium; Attendance: 44,893

May 28, 2017 13 Texas Derby	FC Dallas	0–0	Houston Dynamo	Frisco
19:00 (CDT)		Report	Clark (yellow card) 17'; Cabezas (yellow card) 83'; Deric (yellow card) 90+3'	Stadium: Toyota Stadium; Attendance: 15,055

May 31, 2017 14	Houston Dynamo	5–1	Real Salt Lake	Houston
19:30 (CDT)	Schmidt 3' (o.g.); Alex 15'; Manotas 45'; E.Torres 52'; Cabezas (yellow card) 57'; Leonardo 68'; Garcia (yellow card) 79'	Report	Sunny (yellow card) 54'; Plata 63'}	Stadium: BBVA Compass Stadium; Attendance: 14,148

June 4, 2017 15	Seattle Sounders FC	1–0	Houston Dynamo	Seattle
21:00 (CDT)	Bruin 69'	Report	Alex (yellow card) 28'	Stadium: CenturyLink Field; Attendance: 40,258

June 17, 2017 16	LA Galaxy	2–2	Houston Dynamo	Carson
22:00 (CDT)	Boateng 35'; Alessandrini 90+4'; Smith (yellow card) 90+7'	Report	Manotas 22' (yellow card) 73'; Leonardo (yellow card) 69'; Elis 73' (yellow card) 58'; DeLaGarza (yellow card) 90+1'	Stadium: StubHub Center; Attendance: 25,667

June 23, 2017 17 Texas Derby	Houston Dynamo	1–1	FC Dallas	Houston
20:00 (CDT)	E.Torres 19' (yellow card) 84'; Alex (yellow card) 80'	Report	Harris (yellow card) 55'; Urruti 59'; Grana (yellow card) 80'	Stadium: BBVA Compass Stadium; Attendance: 22,115

July 1, 2017 18	Colorado Rapids	3–1	Houston Dynamo	Commerce City
20:00 (CDT)	da Fonte (yellow card) 4'; Doyle 21'; Hairston 48', 69'; Hamilton (yellow card) 82'	Report	E.Torres 45+5'	Stadium: Dick's Sporting Goods Park; Attendance: 13,774

July 5, 2017 19	Houston Dynamo	3–1	Montreal Impact	Houston
19:30 (CDT)	Wenger 1'; Leonardo (yellow card) 12'; Alex 23'; Clark (yellow card) 25'; Rodríguez 67'	Report	Salazar (yellow card) 4' (goal) 89'; Dzemaili (yellow card) 31'; Bernardello (yellow card) 79'	Stadium: BBVA Compass Stadium; Attendance: 15,470

July 19, 2017 20	Minnesota United FC	0–0	Houston Dynamo	Minneapolis
19:00 (CDT)	Jome (yellow card) 36'; Kallman (yellow card) 90+2'; Martin (yellow card) 90+6'	Report	Clark (yellow card) 45'; Machado (yellow card) 63'	Stadium: TCF Bank Stadium; Attendance: 19,456

July 22, 2017 21	D.C. United	1–3	Houston Dynamo	Washington D.C.
18:00 (CDT)	Boswell 62'; DeLeon (yellow card) 63'; Jeffrey (yellow card) 72'	Report	Wenger 6' (yellow card) 90+5'; Alex (yellow card) 13'; Manotas 15'; Rodríguez 17'; Deric (yellow card) 90+4'	Stadium: RFK Stadium; Attendance: 15,321

July 29, 2017 22	Houston Dynamo	2–2	Portland Timbers	Houston
19:00 (CDT)	Manotas 37'; Cabezas 81', (yellow card) 85'	Report	Valeri 13'; Blanco 43'; Miller (yellow card) 65'; Chara (yellow card) 68'	Stadium: BBVA Compass Stadium; Attendance: 19,382

August 5, 2017 23	Real Salt Lake	0–0	Houston Dynamo	Sandy
21:00 (CDT)	Glad (yellow card) 60'; Beckerman (yellow card) 71'	Report	Alex (yellow card) 64' (yellow-red card) 65'; Elis (yellow card) 81'; DeLaGarza (yellow card) 90+4'	Stadium: Rio Tinto Stadium; Attendance: 19,075

August 12, 2017 24	Houston Dynamo	3–0	San Jose Earthquakes	Houston
20:00 (CDT)	Elis 21' (yellow card) 39'; Garcia (yellow card) 50'; Sanchez 86'; Manotas 90+4'	Report	Imperiale (yellow card) 48'; Alashe (yellow card) 59'	Stadium: BBVA Compass Stadium; Attendance: 16,344

August 19, 2017 25	Vancouver Whitecaps FC	2–1	Houston Dynamo	Vancouver
21:00 (CDT)	Montero 17' (pen.) (yellow card) 71'; Harvey (yellow card) 31'; Reyna 32'; Nerwinski (yellow card) 41'; Ousted (yellow card) 79'	Report	Machado (yellow card) 46'; Quioto 51'; Garcia (yellow card) 73'; Cabezas (yellow card) 83'; DeLaGarza (yellow card) 90+3'	Stadium: BC Place; Attendance: 21,183

August 23, 2017 26 Texas Derby	FC Dallas	3–3	Houston Dynamo	Frisco
20:00 (CDT)	Akindele 45', (yellow card) 53'; Grana (yellow card) 45+1'; Figueroa 45+2'; Urruti 51'; Barrios (yellow card) 63'	Report	Sanchez 1'; Garcia (yellow card) 25'; E.Torres (yellow card) 25', (goal) 71', 86'; Garcia (yellow card) 80'; Manotas (yellow card) 90'	Stadium: Toyota Stadium; Attendance: 13,339

September 9, 2017 28	Houston Dynamo	0–1	Colorado Rapids	Houston
19:30 (CDT)	Clark (yellow card) 55'; Alex (yellow card) 57'	Report	Ford (yellow card) 52'; Badji (yellow card) 80' (goal) 90+3'; Williams (yellow card) 82'	Stadium: BBVA Compass Stadium; Attendance: 18,105

September 16, 2017 29	San Jose Earthquakes	1–0	Houston Dynamo	San Jose
21:30 (CDT)	Hoesen 33'; Sarkodie (yellow card) 36'; Imperiale (yellow card) 86'	Report	Martinez (yellow card) 53'; Elis (yellow card) 81'; DeLaGarza (yellow card) 90+1'	Stadium: Avaya Stadium; Attendance: 18,000

September 23, 2017 30	New York City FC	1–1	Houston Dynamo	East Hartford
14:00 (CDT)	Moralez 6'	Report	Manotas 16'	Stadium: Pratt & Whitney Stadium at Rentschler Field; Attendance: 10,165

September 27, 2017 31	Houston Dynamo	3-3	LA Galaxy	Houston
19:30 (CDT)	Cabezas (yellow card) 23'; Martinez 26', (yellow card) 61'; Elis 84' (pen.), 88'	Report	DaMarcus Beasley 3' (o.g.); Alessandrini 12'; Arellano (yellow card) 31'; Jamieson 47'; Diop (yellow card) 57'; J.dos Santos (yellow card) 61'; G.dos Santos (yellow card) 71'; Jones (yellow card) 90+2'	Stadium: BBVA Compass Stadium; Attendance: 16,062

September 30, 2017 32	Houston Dynamo	2-1	Minnesota United FC	Houston
19:30 (CDT)	Elis 69', (yellow card) 70'; Quioto 85', (yellow card) 85'	Report	Boxall (yellow card) 68'; Calvo (yellow card) 87'; Nicholson 90+1'	Stadium: BBVA Compass Stadium; Attendance: 16,133

October 11, 2017 27	Houston Dynamo	2-1	Sporting Kansas City	Houston
19:00 (CDT)	Clark (yellow card) 45'; Martínez 63'; Palmer-Brown 77' (o.g.); Wenger (yellow card) 79'	Report	Medranda 33'; Ilie (yellow card) 87'	Stadium: BBVA Compass Stadium; Attendance: 15,724
Note: Rescheduled from August 26 due to Hurricane Harvey

October 15, 2017 33	Sporting Kansas City	0-0	Houston Dynamo	Kansas City
18:30 (CDT)	Blessing (yellow card) 90+4'	Report	Torres (yellow card) 67'; DeLaGarza (yellow card) 85'	Stadium: Children's Mercy Park; Attendance: 19,083

October 22, 2017 34	Houston Dynamo	3-0	Chicago Fire	Houston
15:00 (CDT)	Leonardo 2'; Quioto 68'; Manotas 75'	Report		Stadium: BBVA Compass Stadium; Attendance: 20,456

==== Overall table ====
Pos	Team	Pld	W	L	T	GF	GA	GD	Pts	Qualification
1	Toronto FC (C, S)	34	20	5	9	74	37	+37	69	CONCACAF Champions League
2	New York City FC	34	16	9	9	56	43	+13	57	
3	Chicago Fire	34	16	11	7	61	47	+14	55	
4	Atlanta United FC	34	15	9	10	70	40	+30	55	
5	Columbus Crew	34	16	12	6	53	49	+4	54	
6	Portland Timbers	34	15	11	8	60	50	+10	53	
7	Seattle Sounders FC	34	14	9	11	52	39	+13	53	
8	Vancouver Whitecaps FC	34	15	12	7	50	49	+1	52	
9	New York Red Bulls	34	14	12	8	53	47	+6	50	
10	Houston Dynamo	34	13	10	11	57	45	+12	50	
11	Sporting Kansas City	34	12	9	13	40	29	+11	49	CONCACAF Champions League
12	San Jose Earthquakes	34	13	14	7	39	60	−21	46	
13	FC Dallas	34	11	10	13	48	48	0	46	
14	Real Salt Lake	34	13	15	6	49	55	−6	45	
15	New England Revolution	34	13	15	6	53	61	−8	45	
16	Philadelphia Union	34	11	14	9	50	47	+3	42	
17	Montreal Impact	34	11	17	6	52	58	−6	39	
18	Orlando City SC	34	10	15	9	39	58	−19	39	
19	Minnesota United FC	34	10	18	6	47	70	−23	36	
20	Colorado Rapids	34	9	19	6	31	51	−20	33	
21	D.C. United	34	9	20	5	31	60	−29	32	
22	LA Galaxy	34	8	18	8	45	67	−22	32	

Source: MLS
Rules for classification: 1) points; 2) total wins; 3) total goal differential; 4) total goals scored; 5) disciplinary points; 6) away goals scored; 7) away goal differential; 8) coin toss or drawing of lots
(C) MLS Cup Champion; (S) Supporters' Shield

=== U.S. Open Cup ===
June 14, 2017 Fourth round	North Carolina	2–3 (a.e.t.)	Houston Dynamo	Cary
18:30 (CDT)	Miller 4' da Luz (yellow card) 43'; Laing 69'	Report	Wenger 25' (yellow card) 87'; Remick 62'; Bird (yellow card) 66'; Luna (yellow card) 101'; Rodríguez 109'	Stadium: WakeMed Soccer Park; Attendance: 4,325

June 28, 2017 Fifth round	Houston Dynamo	0–2	Sporting Kansas City	Houston
17:30 (CDT)	Bird (yellow card) 23'; Wenger (yellow card) 48'; Rodríguez (yellow card) 64'	Report	Espinoza (yellow card) 49'; Opara 61'; Gerso 90+1'	Stadium: BBVA Compass Stadium; Attendance: 6,095

=== MLS Cup Playoffs ===
October 26, 2017 Knockout round	Houston Dynamo	1-0 a.e.t	Sporting Kansas City	Houston
8:30(CDT)	Alberth Elis	Report		Stadium: BBVA Compass Stadium

Conference Semifinals - Leg 1	Houston Dynamo	0-0	Portland Timbers	Houston
				Stadium: BBVA Compass Stadium

Conference Semifinals - Leg 2	Portland Timbers	1-2	Houston Dynamo	Portland
				Stadium: Providence Park

Conference Finals - Leg 1	Houston Dynamo	0 - 2	Seattle Sounders	Houston
		Report	2	Stadium: BBVA Compass Stadium

Conference Finals - Leg 2	Seattle Sounders	3 - 0	Houston Dynamo	Seattle
	3	Report	0	Stadium: CenturyLink Field

== Player statistics ==
As of match played October 15, 2017

=== Appearances and goals ===
No.	Pos	Nat	Player	Total		MLS		U.S. Open Cup	
No.	Pos	Nat	Player	Apps	Goals	Apps	Goals	Apps	Goals
1	GK	(United States) USA	Tyler Deric	26	0	26	0	0	0
2	DF	(United States) USA	Jalil Anibaba	10	0	4+4	0	2	0
3	DF	(Panama) PAN	Adolfo Machado	33	0	33	0	0	0
4	DF	(Switzerland) SUI	Philippe Senderos	2	0	2	0	0	0
5	MF	(Colombia) COL	Juan David Cabezas	27	1	26+1	1	0	0
6	MF	(United States) USA	Eric Alexander	12	0	11+1	0	0	0
7	MF	(United States) USA	DaMarcus Beasley	24	0	22+2	0	0	0
8	MF	(England) ENG	Joe Holland	7	0	0+5	0	1+1	0
9	FW	(Mexico) MEX	Erick Torres	27	14	23+4	14	0	0
10	MF	(Uruguay) URU	Vicente Sánchez	23	2	3+18	2	2	0
11	FW	(United States) USA	Andrew Wenger	24	3	12+10	2	2	1
12	FW	(Honduras) HON	Romell Quioto	22	7	14+8	7	0	0
13	MF	(United States) USA	Ricardo Clark	28	0	26+2	0	0	0
14	MF	(Brazil) BRA	Alex	33	2	28+4	2	1	0
15	DF	(United States) USA	Dylan Remick	16	2	13+1	1	2	1
16	DF	(United States) USA	Kevin Garcia	5	0	2+1	0	2	0
17	FW	(Honduras) HON	Alberth Elis	26	10	18+8	10	0	0
18	MF	(United States) USA	Memo Rodríguez	11	3	3+6	2	2	1
19	FW	(Colombia) COL	Mauro Manotas	33	10	24+9	10	0	0
20	DF	(Guam) GUM	A. J. DeLaGarza	30	0	30	0	0	0
22	DF	(Brazil) BRA	Leonardo	30	2	29+1	2	0	0
23	MF	(Honduras) HON	José Escalante	4	0	0+3	0	0+1	0
25	MF	(Argentina) ARG	Tomás Martínez	8	1	4+4	1	0	0
26	DF	(United States) USA	Taylor Hunter	2	0	0	0	2	0
27	MF	(Honduras) HON	Boniek García	21	0	12+8	0	0+1	0
28	MF	(England) ENG	Charlie Ward	3	0	0+1	0	2	0
31	GK	(United States) USA	Joe Willis	10	0	8	0	2	0
Players eligible from Rio Grande Valley:
35	MF	(United States) USA	Eric Bird	2	0	0	0	2	0
39	FW	(Mexico) MEX	Rubén Luna	2	0	0	0	0+2	0
41	MF	(Jamaica) JAM	Jorginho James	1	0	0	0	0+1	0
Players away from the club on loan:
Players who left Houston Dynamo during the season:

=== Goal scorers ===
As of match played October 22, 2017

Place	Position	Nation	Number	Name	MLS	U.S. Open Cup	Total
1	FW	(Mexico)	9	Erick Torres	14	0	14
2	FW	(Honduras)	17	Alberth Elis	10	0	10
3	FW	(Colombia)	19	Mauro Manotas	10	0	10
4	FW	(Honduras)	12	Romell Quioto	7	0	7
5	FW	(United States)	11	Andrew Wenger	2	1	3
5	MF	(United States)	18	Memo Rodríguez	2	1	3
7	MF	(Brazil)	14	Alex	2	0	2
7	MF	(Uruguay)	10	Vicente Sánchez	2	0	2
7	DF	(Brazil)	22	Leonardo	2	0	2
7	MF	(Argentina)	25	Tomás Martínez	2	0	2
7	DF	(United States)	15	Dylan Remick	1	1	2
10	MF	(Colombia)	5	Juan David Cabezas	1	0	1
Own Goal					2	0	2
TOTALS					57	3	60

=== Assists ===
As of match played October 22, 2017

Place	Position	Nation	Number	Name	MLS	U.S. Open Cup	Total
1	MF	(Brazil)	14	Alex	10	0	10
2	MF	(Uruguay)	10	Vicente Sánchez	5	1	6
3	FW	(Colombia)	19	Mauro Manotas	5	0	5
4	MF	(Honduras)	27	Boniek Garcia	4	0	4
4	FW	(Honduras)	17	Alberth Elis	4	0	4
6	FW	(Honduras)	12	Romell Quioto	3	0	3
6	FW	(Mexico)	9	Erick Torres	3	0	3
6	DF	(Guam)	20	A. J. DeLaGarza	3	0	3
9	MF	(United States)	13	Ricardo Clark	2	0	2
9	FW	(United States)	11	Andrew Wenger	2	0	2
9	DF	(Panama)	3	Adolfo Machado	2	0	2
10	MF	(United States)	18	Memo Rodríguez	1	0	1
10	MF	(United States)	6	Eric Alexander	1	0	1
10	MF	(United States)	7	DaMarcus Beasley	1	0	1
10	DF	(Brazil)	22	Leonardo	1	0	1
TOTALS					47	1	48

=== Disciplinary record ===
As of match played October 22, 2017

Number	Nation	Position	Name	MLS		U.S. Open Cup		Total	
Number	Nation	Position	Name	Booked	Sent off (straight red)	Booked	Sent off (straight red)	Booked	Sent off (straight red)
1	(United States)	GK	Tyler Deric	2	0	0	0	2	0
3	(Panama)	DF	Adolfo Machado	5	0	0	0	5	0
5	(Colombia)	DF	Juan David Cabezas	7	0	0	0	7	0
9	(Mexico)	FW	Erick Torres Padilla	6	0	0	0	6	0
11	(United States)	FW	Andrew Wenger	2	0	2	0	4	0
12	(Honduras)	FW	Romell Quioto	4	0	0	0	4	0
13	(United States)	MF	Ricardo Clark	6	0	0	0	6	0
14	(Brazil)	MF	Alex	6	1	0	0	6	1
15	(United States)	DF	Dylan Remick	1	0	0	0	1	0
16	(United States)	DF	Kevin Garcia	1	0	0	0	1	0
17	(Honduras)	FW	Alberth Elis	8	0	0	0	8	0
18	(United States)	MF	Memo Rodríguez	0	0	1	0	1	0
19	(Colombia)	FW	Mauro Manotas	3	0	0	0	3	0
20	(Guam)	DF	A. J. DeLaGarza	8	0	0	0	8	0
22	(Brazil)	DF	Leonardo	3	0	0	0	3	0
25	(Argentina)	MF	Tomás Martínez	2	0	0	0	2	0
27	(Honduras)	MF	Boniek García	4	0	0	0	4	0
31	(United States)	GK	Joe Willis	1	0	0	0	1	0
35	(United States)	MF	Eric Bird	0	0	2	0	2	0
39	(Mexico)	FW	Rubén Luna	0	0	1	0	1	0
			TOTALS	69	1	6	0	75	1
