= Eric Bird =

American soccer player

Personal information
- Date of birth: April 8, 1993 (age 33)
- Place of birth: Virginia Beach, Virginia, U.S.
- Height: 1.80 m (5 ft 11 in)
- Position: Midfielder

Youth career
- –2011: Beach FC

College career
Years	Team	Apps	(Gls)
2011–2014	Virginia Cavaliers	73	(15)

Senior career*
Years	Team	Apps	(Gls)
2015	Philadelphia Union	0	(0)
2015	→ Harrisburg City Islanders (loan)	3	(0)
2016–2017	Rio Grande Valley FC	52	(11)
2017–2019	Houston Dynamo	6	(0)
2018–2019	→ Rio Grande Valley FC (loan)	21	(3)
2020–2023	FC Tulsa	100	(7)
Total		182	(21)
- * Club domestic league appearances and goals

Eric Bird (born April 8, 1993) is an American former professional soccer player.

== Career ==
=== Amateur ===
Bird was born and raised in Virginia Beach, Virginia. He attended Frank W Cox High School, who he helped lead to state titles in 2009 and 2010. His best individual season was 2011, where he scored 28 goals and picked up 22 assists in just 24 games and was named as the Virginia High School State Player of the Year.

Bird played four years of college soccer at the University of Virginia between 2011 and 2014. During his freshman season, he started 8 of the first 9 games before suffering a season ending knee injury. The following season, Bird recovered fully from the injury and started every game of the season. For the 2013 season, Bird was named captain and repaid the decision by leading the team with 7 goals and playing in every game of the season. Bird was a NSCAA Third-Team All-American for 2013. For his senior year, Bird again captained Virginia and led the team to a National Championship. He was named as a NSCAA Second-Team All-All American.

=== Professional ===
On January 15, 2015, Bird was picked 41st overall in the 2015 MLS SuperDraft by the Philadelphia Union.

He made his professional debut with Philadelphia's United Soccer League affiliate Harrisburg City Islanders on May 28, 2015, during a US Open Cup fixture against the Rochester Rhinos. On December 20, 2015, Philadelphia declined Bird's contract option after he made just 3 appearances with the Islanders and 0 with the Union.

Bird moved to United Soccer League side Rio Grande Valley FC Toros on March 16, 2016. Bird made his Toros debut on March 26 in a 2–0 loss to the Tulsa Roughnecks. He scored his first goal on June 11 in a 3–0 win over OKC Energy and would score in his next 2 matches as well. Bird and enjoyed a strong season and helped the Toros qualify for the playoffs. Bird would score in the 76th minute to give RGVFC the lead, but OKC Energy came back to win after giving up 2 goals in stoppage time.

Bird was named as the RGVFC captain for 2017 and had another strong season. He was rewarded for his performances by being called up on loan to the Toros' MLS affiliate club, the Houston Dynamo, for two US Open Cup games. On December 22, 2017, Bird signed a first team contract with the Dynamo and was reunited with Wilmer Cabrera, who was Bird's head coach for RGVFC in 2016 and had become the Dynamo head coach prior to the 2017 season.

Three years after being selected in the MLS draft, Bird made his MLS debut on June 2, playing the full 90 minutes in a 1–0 loss to the Montreal Impact. He would make 2 appearances for the Dynamo in the 2018 US Open Cup as the Dynamo went on to defeat the Union in the final. Bird spend 2018 shifting back and forth between Houston and RGV.

Bird spent 2019 primarily with RGVFC and only made 2 appearances for the Dynamo, with neither being in the league. On November 21, the Dynamo declined his contract option for 2020, making Bird a free agent.

On December 26, 2019, Bird signed with USL Championship side FC Tulsa. He made his debut for Tulsa on July 13 in a 1–1 draw with the OKC Energy. In a shortened season due to the COVID-19 pandemic, Bird made 13 appearances, helping Tulsa qualify for the playoffs. In their opening game of the playoffs, Tulsa and Bird lost 4–2 on penalties to El Paso Locomotive FC after playing to a 2–2 draw. He became a free agent following Tulsa's 2023 season.

== Personal life ==
He was in a relationship with Morgan Brian from 2013 to 2015. In 2024, Bird joined Davenport & Co. as an associate financial advisor.

== Career statistics ==
Updated as of December 22, 2020

Club	Season	League			US Open Cup		Playoffs		Continental		Total	
Club	Season	Division	Apps	Goals	Apps	Goals	Apps	Goals	Apps	Goals	Apps	Goals
Philadelphia Union	2015	MLS	0	0	0	0	–		–		0	0
Harrisburg City Islanders (loan)	2015	USL	3	0	1	0	–		–		4	0
Rio Grande Valley FC	2016	USL	22	6	–		1	1	–		23	7
Rio Grande Valley FC	2017	USL	29	4	–		–		–		29	4
Houston Dynamo	2017	MLS	0	0	2	0	0	0	–		2	0
Houston Dynamo	2018	MLS	6	0	2	0	–		–		8	0
Houston Dynamo	2019	MLS	0	0	1	0	–		1 (Note: Appearance in Leagues Cup)	0	2	0
Rio Grande Valley FC (loan)	2018	USL	4	1	–		–		–		4	1
Rio Grande Valley FC (loan)	2019	USLC	17	2	–		–		–		17	2
FC Tulsa	2020	USLC	13	0	0	0	1	0	–		14	0
RGVFC Total			72	12	0	0	1	1	0	0	73	13
Dynamo Total			6	0	5	0	0	0	1	0	12	0
Career total			81	13	6	0	1	1	1	0	89	14

== Honors ==
=== Team ===
==== Virginia Cavaliers ====
- NCAA Division 1 Men's Soccer Championship: 2014

==== Houston Dynamo ====
- US Open Cup: 2018
