= Camilo Monroy =

Colombian footballer (born 1998)

Personal information
- Full name: Camilo Monroy Restrepo
- Date of birth: 25 October 1998 (age 28)
- Place of birth: Itagüí, Colombia
- Height: 1.70 m (5 ft 7 in)
- Position: Forward

Senior career*
Years	Team	Apps	(Gls)
2015–2019	América de Cali	0	(0)
2017–2018	→ Rio Grande Valley FC (loan)	25	(1)
2019	Rio Grande Valley FC		
2022	Leones	23	(2)
2023	El Farolito		
2023	Cosmos Nowotaniec	2	(0)
- * Club domestic league appearances and goals as of 4 July 2024

Camilo Monroy Restrepo (born 25 September 1998) is a Colombian footballer who plays as a midfielder.

== Career ==
=== Professional ===
Monroy joined Houston Dynamo's United Soccer League affiliate Rio Grande Valley FC Toros on 23 March 2017 from América de Cali.
