= Januário Silva =

Portuguese footballer

Janú Silva
Personal information
- Full name: Januário Constâncio Carvalho Silva
- Date of birth: 26 February 1992 (age 34)
- Place of birth: Cascais, Portugal
- Height: 1.90 m (6 ft 3 in)
- Position: Forward

Youth career
- 2005–2012: Estoril
- 2012–2014: Lourel

Senior career*
Years	Team	Apps	(Gls)
2014–2015	Loures	23	(8)
2015–2016	Ideal	31	(3)
2016–2017	Sacavenense	28	(8)
2017–2018	1º Dezembro	29	(6)
2018	Vilafranquense	13	(1)
2019	Tulsa Roughnecks	27	(7)
2020–2021	Atlético CP	9	(2)
- * Club domestic league appearances and goals as of 24 October 2019

Januário "Janú" Constâncio Carvalho Silva (born 26 February 1992) is a Portuguese footballer who plays as a forward.
