= Marlon Forrester =

American artist, painter, and educator

Marlon Forrester (born 1976, Georgetown, Guyana) is a painter, artist, and educator raised in Boston, MA. He is a graduate of School of the Museum of Fine Arts Boston, B.A. 2008 and Yale School of Art, M.F.A. 2010.
