= Marlon Reid =

British professional boxer (born 1982)

Personal information
- Nationality: British
- Born: Marlon Reid; 17 April 1982 (age 44) Swindon
- Height: 6 ft 2 in (188 cm)
- Weight: Middleweight

Boxing career
- Stance: Orthodox

Boxing record
- Total fights: 7
- Wins: 5
- Win by KO: 2
- Losses: 2
- Draws: 0
- No contests: 0

Marlon Reid (born 17 April 1982) is a British professional boxer who was born in Swindon and currently lives in Bath. After reaching the ABA final against George Groves as an amateur Reid boxed for England and made his debut as a professional boxer on 17 October 2008 against Gary Cooper and won on points. Reid continued his great start winning his first four fights, two by way of knock out.

== Amateur career ==
Reid boxed for the Walcot ABA club in Swindon. As an amateur Reid made it to the ABA finals at his first attempt as a senior. He faced George Groves at York Hall, Bethnal Green on 2 December 2006, Reid lost 24–18 on points. George Groves was favourite and has since gone on to become the Commonwealth super middleweight champion.

Reid also represented England including the Four Nations in Calais, France in April 2007 where he reached the semi-final against Jean Mickael Raymond of France losing 24–19 on points.

== Professional career ==
Reid fought his first professional fight on 17 October 2008 and had a great start to his career winning his first four fights against Gary Cooper, James Tucker, Sherman Alleyne and Ernie Smith.

Reid suffered his first defeat on 24 October 2009 on points against Patrick Mendy at the Riviera International Conference Centre, Torquay, Devon. Though Reid was suffering from a viral infection at the time.

Reid came back on 4 December 2009 with a win over Pawel Trebinski on points but then suffered defeat in his next fight against Steffan Hughes.

== Personal life ==
Reid attended Churchfields School in Swindon.

He lives in Bristol, England.

== Professional boxing record ==
5 Wins (2 knockouts, 3 decisions) 2 Loss, 0 Draws
Res.	Opponent	Type	Rounds fought (rounds scheduled)	Date	Venue	Location	Notes
Loss	(United Kingdom) Steffan Hughes	TKO	4 (6)	23 April 2010	Oasis Leisure Centre	Swindon, Wiltshire, England	
Win	(United Kingdom) Pawel Trebinski	PTS	6 (6)	4 December 2010	Oasis Leisure Centre	Swindon, Wiltshire, England	
Loss	(United Kingdom) Patrick Mendy	PTS	6 (6)	24 October 2009	Riviera International Conference Centre	Torquay, Devon, England	
Win	(United Kingdom) Ernie Smith	TKO	1 (4)	24 July 2009	Oasis Leisure Centre	Swindon, Wiltshire, England	
Win	(United Kingdom) Sherman Alleyne	TKO	4 (4)	13 February 2009	Oasis Leisure Centre	Swindon, Wiltshire, England	
Win	(United Kingdom) James Tucker	PTS	4 (4)	14 December 2008	Thistle Hotel	Bristol, England	
Win	(United Kingdom) Gary Cooper	PTS	4 (4)	17 October 2008	Oasis Leisure Centre	Swindon, Wiltshire, England	
