= Marlon Costa =

Bissau-Guinean footballer in Portugal's Liga 3

Personal information
- Full name: Marlon Rezende Emídio Costa
- Date of birth: 20 January 1995 (age 31)
- Place of birth: Bissau, Guinea-Bissau
- Height: 1.92 m (6 ft 4 in)
- Position: Midfielder

Team information
- Current team: Oriental Dragon FC
- Number: 4

Youth career
- Mavegro FC
- FC Tigres de Fronteira
- 2012—2014: Vitória Setúbal

Senior career*
Years	Team	Apps	(Gls)
2014—2016	Vitória Setúbal	1	(0)
2014—2015	→ Pinhalnovense (loan)	25	(1)
2015	→ Sacavenense (loan)	7	(0)
2015	→ Reguengos (loan)	1	(0)
2016—2017	S.C. Farense		
2016	→ Real (loan)	14	(0)
2017—2018	Real	9	(0)
2017—2018	→ Camacha (loan)	13	(0)
2018—2019	Portimonense U23	21	(0)
2019—2020	Pinhalnovense	24	(2)
2020—	Oriental Dragon FC	38	(2)
- * Club domestic league appearances and goals as of 22:54, 9 November 2021 (CDT)

Marlon Rezende Emídio Costa (born 20 January 1995) is a Bissau-Guinean footballer who plays as a midfielder for Portugal's Liga 3 club Oriental Dragon FC.

== Career ==
Prior to leaving Guinea-Bissau to play in the Portuguese league, Costa played in youth leagues for Mavegro FC and FC Tigres de Fronteira; in Portugal, he joined Vitória Setúbal's non-professional teams. He later signed on with Vitória Setúbal professionally. He debuted on 12 January 2014 in a 2013–14 Primeira Liga match against Olhanense. During this time, he was loaned to Pinhalnovense, Sacavenense, and Reguengos. In 2016, he signed a 1.5 year contract with S.C. Farense. Farense loaned Costa to Real SC between February and June 2016 before trading him in 2017. Real SC subsequently loaned him to Camacha.

After a season, he left Real SC and Camacha for Portimonense's U23 team for a year before joining their professional team. In 2020, he signed a two-year contract with Oriental Dragon FC. He debuted for this team on 17 September 2021.
