= Rodrigo (footballer, born 1985) =

Brazilian footballer

Personal information
- Full name: Rodrigo Leandro da Costa
- Date of birth: 17 September 1985 (age 41)
- Place of birth: Brazil
- Height: 6 ft 0 in (1.83 m)
- Position: Forward

Senior career*
Years	Team	Apps	(Gls)
–2011	Al-Orouba		
2011–2012	Al Shabab Al Arabi		(9)
2013	Busan IPark	18	(2)
2014	Muaither SC	6	(1)
2017	Bangu	2	(0)
2018	Naxxar Lions	2	(0)
- * Club domestic league appearances and goals as of 14:13, 10 February 2019 (UTC)

Rodrigo Leandro da Costa (Brazilian Portuguese: [ʁoˈdɾiɡu leˈɐ̃dɾu dɐ ˈkɔstɐ]; born 17 September 1985), known as Rodrigo, is a Brazilian footballer.

In January 2013, Rodrigo joined Korean K League Classic side Busan IPark. He made his debut for IPark on 10 March 2013 against Gyeongnam FC and his first goal for the club came from the penalty spot against Daejeon Citizen on 28 April.

== Club career statistics ==
As of 10 November 2013

Club performance			League		Cup		League Cup		Total	
Season	Club	League	Apps	Goals	Apps	Goals	Apps	Goals	Apps	Goals
2013	Busan IPark	K League Classic	18	2	2	0	-	-	20	2
Career total			18	2	2	0	0	0	20	2
