= Marlon Martins =

Brazilian footballer

Personal information
- Full name: Marlon Martins de Oliveira
- Date of birth: 3 January 1997 (age 29)
- Place of birth: Alvorada do Sul, Brazil
- Height: 1.78 m (5 ft 10 in)
- Position: Forward

Youth career
- 2012–2015: São Paulo
- 2016–2017: São Caetano

Senior career*
Years	Team	Apps	(Gls)
2017–2020	São Caetano	39	(7)
2020–2021	Botafogo-PB	3	(0)
2021	Hercílio Luz	6	(0)
2021–2022	Votuporanguense	28	(9)
2022	Portuguesa-RJ	10	(1)
2023	Cianorte	5	(1)
2023	São José-SP	6	(1)
2023–2024	Juventus-SP	25	(5)
2025	São Luiz	10	(0)
2025	Sertãozinho	5	(0)
2025–	São José-SP	8	(2)
- * Club domestic league appearances and goals as of 8 September 2025

Marlon Martins de Oliveira (born 3 January 1997), simply known as Marlon Martins, is a Brazilian professional footballer who plays as a forward.

== Career ==
Having spent time in the youth category at São Paulo FC, Martins was the highlight of AD São Caetano in the 2017 Copa São Paulo Futebol Jr. He played for the club until 2020, being champion of the Copa Paulista and Série A2. He later defended Botafogo-PB, Hercílio Luz, Votuporanguense, Portuguesa-RJ, Cianorte, São José and CA Juventus.

In the 2025 season, Martins played for São Luiz, Sertãozinho and São José-SP teams.

== Honours ==
São Caetano

- Copa Paulista: 2019
- Campeonato Paulista Série A2: 2020

Sertãozinho

- Campeonato Paulista Série A3: 2025
