= Marlon Ramos =

Brazilian internet personality, music video producer and record producer

Marlon Sandino de Ramos Rodrigues, known professionally as Marlon Ramos is a Brazilian internet personality, music video producer and record producer.

== Biography ==
Marlon Ramos was born in Apiai and raised in Guapiara. Later moved to Curitiba, where he studied cinematography, post-production and photography.

== Career ==
He is best known for directing music videos, short films, music records, YouTube series and is currently associated with Marlon Ramos Film.

== See also ==
- Lists of people from Brazil
