= Marlon Parker =

South African social entrepreneur

Marlon Parker is the founder of Reconstructed Living Labs (RLabs) - a South African social entrepreneur who uses information communications technology (ICT) to empower communities, a World Economic Forum Young Global Leader and named by the Mail and Guardian as 1 of 300 young South Africans you have to take out to lunch. He was elected an Ashoka Fellow in 2014.

Parker is a former Lecturer at Cape Peninsula University of Technology and currently head of Mxit Reach, which is centered on using the innovative technology built by Mxit to create free mobile educational, health care, agricultural and community applications. With over 50 million users, Mxit is Africa's largest social network.

Parker's work as a social entrepreneur, and in particular his successes with RLabs franchise, has seen Reconstructed Living Labs popping up all over the world in places like Brazil, Namibia, Tanzania, Nigeria and Somalia. The RLabs model has been replicated in 23 countries, it has incubated 22 social enterprises, and employs 80 people – most of them in Cape Town. More than four million people have accessed support services through RLabs.

He was named the National LEAD SA Hero of 2015, a Primedia Broadcasting initiative, supported by Independent Newspapers to promote active citizenship. Founded in August 2010, shortly after the historic 2010 Soccer World Cup, Lead SA was born to celebrate the achievements of the country while taking responsibility for its problems and challenges.
