= Fredlin Mompremier =

Haitian footballer (born 1996)

Personal information
- Date of birth: 25 November 1996 (age 29)
- Place of birth: Limbe, Haiti
- Height: 1.82 m (6 ft 0 in)
- Position: Forward

Team information
- Current team: Safa
- Number: 80

College career
Years	Team	Apps	(Gls)
2015–2016	Tampa Spartans	32	(17)
2017–2018	Fairleigh Dickinson Knights	24	(5)

Senior career*
Years	Team	Apps	(Gls)
2017–2018	Ocean City Nor'easters	26	(10)
2019	Tulsa Roughnecks	20	(1)
2020	Sporting Kansas City II	16	(1)
2021–2022	Sfîntul Gheorghe	14	(0)
2023–	Safa	4	(0)
- * Club domestic league appearances and goals as of 14:16, 8 February 2023 (UTC)

Fredlin Mompremier (born 25 November 1996) is a Haitian footballer who plays as a forward for Lebanese Premier League club Safa.

== Career ==
On 26 February 2020, he signed with USL Championship side Sporting Kansas City II. He was released by Sporting Kansas City on 30 November 2020. On 12 July 2021, he signed for Moldovan club FC Sfîntul Gheorghe.
