= Tobenna Uzo =

Nigerian footballer

Toby Uzo
Personal information
- Full name: Tobenna Jonathan Uzo
- Date of birth: October 13, 1994 (age 32)
- Place of birth: Lagos, Nigeria
- Height: 1.94 m (6 ft 4 in)
- Position: Forward

College career
Years	Team	Apps	(Gls)
2013–2014	Houston Baptist Huskies	30	(14)
2015	Coastal Carolina Chanticleers	18	(6)

Senior career*
Years	Team	Apps	(Gls)
2016–2017	Myrtle Beach Mutiny	24	(17)
2017–2018	Colorado Springs Switchbacks	26	(1)
2019–2020	FC Tulsa	29	(7)
2021	FC Arizona	8	(8)
2021	FC Tucson	12	(2)
- * Club domestic league appearances and goals as of 2 November 2021

Tobenna "Toby" Jonathan Uzo (born October 13, 1994) is a Nigerian footballer. His brother is fellow footballer Uchenna Uzo.

== Career ==
Uzo attended Houston Baptist College in 2012, but did not play college soccer until 2013. Uzo transferred to Coastal Carolina University in 2015 for his senior year.

On January 19, 2016, Uzo was selected in the fourth round (68th overall) of the 2016 MLS SuperDraft by Orlando City SC. He was not signed by Orlando and later joined National Premier Soccer League with Myrtle Beach Mutiny in 2016. He also stayed with the club when they moved to the USL PDL in 2017.

Uzo signed a professional contract with USL club Colorado Springs Switchbacks on August 29, 2017.

On January 4, 2019, Uzo joined USL Championship side FC Tulsa. He was given the Goal of the Year award by fan vote in both 2019 and 2020.

Uzo was signed by FC Tucson after a brief stint with FC Arizona of the NPSL on July 1, 2021.
