= Marlon Schwantes =

Brazilian footballer

Personal information
- Full name: Marlon Rogério Schwantes
- Date of birth: 27 March 1984 (age 42)
- Place of birth: Condor, Rio Grande do Sul, Brazil
- Height: 1.87 m (6 ft 2 in)
- Position: Defender

Team information
- Current team: NK Konavljanin

Youth career
- EC Bangu (Condor)
- AA Ponte Preta (Panambi)
- EC Roma (Panambi)

Senior career*
Years	Team	Apps	(Gls)
2004	SER Panambi		
2005	Passo Fundo		
2005	São Luiz		
2006–2007	NK Solin	31	(4)
2007–2010	NK MIK CM Celje	20	(1)
2010–2011	NK Drava Ptuj	21	(2)
2011–	NK Konavljanin	4	(2)
- * Club domestic league appearances and goals as of 03:40, 3 November 2011 (UTC)

Marlon Rogério Schwantes (born 27 March 1984) is a Brazilian football defender currently playing for NK Konavljanin in Treća HNL Jug.

After starting his career in his home country, playing for a number of local clubs, including SER Panambi, Passo Fundo and São Luiz, Marlon moved in February 2006 to the second-tier Croatian side NK Solin. After a year there, he signed for the Slovenian first-tier side NK MIK CM Celje. A starter in his first season, he missed the 2008/2009 and 2009/2010 seasons due to injury. In the summer of 2010 he signed for the Slovenian second-tier side NK Drava Ptuj, where he played for a year, before moving, in late September 2011, to the Treća HNL Jug side NK Konavljanin.
