= Romilio Hernandez =

US association football player (born 1995)

Personal information
- Full name: Romilio Leonel Hernandez Flores
- Date of birth: 20 March 1995 (age 31)
- Place of birth: Lanham, Maryland, United States
- Height: 1.84 m (6 ft 0 in)
- Position: Midfielder

Team information
- Current team: Harrisburg Heat

College career
Years	Team	Apps	(Gls)
2013–2016	Louisville Cardinals	77	(3)

Senior career*
Years	Team	Apps	(Gls)
2014	Orlando City U-23	4	(0)
2015	Portland Timbers U23s	5	(1)
2017	Phoenix Rising	2	(0)
2018–2019	Rio Grande Valley FC	31	(2)
2020–	Harrisburg Heat (indoor)	0	(0)

International career^{‡}
2012	United States U18		
2013–2015	El Salvador U20		
- * Club domestic league appearances and goals as of October 26, 2019 ‡ National team caps and goals as of April 7, 2017

Romilio Leonel Hernandez Flores (born March 20, 1995) is a Salvadoran footballer who plays as a midfielder for the Harrisburg Heat in the Major Arena Soccer League.

== Career ==
=== College and amateur ===
Hernandez played four years of college soccer at the University of Louisville between 2013 and 2016, scoring 3 goals and tallying 4 assists in 77 appearances. While at college, Hernandez also appeared for USL PDL sides Orlando City U-23 and Portland Timbers U23s.

=== Professional ===
On January 17, 2017, Hernandez was selected in the fourth round (80th overall) of the 2017 MLS SuperDraft by Portland Timbers.

Hernandez signed with United Soccer League club Phoenix Rising on March 24, 2017.

Hernandez joined USL side Rio Grande Valley FC Toros in August 2018.
