= Christian Altamirano =

Honduran footballer (born 1989)

Personal information
- Full name: Christian Josué Altamirano Metzgen
- Date of birth: 26 November 1989 (age 36)
- Place of birth: San Pedro Sula, Honduras
- Height: 1.70 m (5 ft 7 in)
- Position: Attacking midfielder

Team information
- Current team: Olancho
- Number: 41

Senior career*
Years	Team	Apps	(Gls)
2008–2009	Deportes Savio		
2009–2010	Olimpia		
2010–2011	→ Vida	26	(1)
2011–2014	Marathón	35	(2)
2014–2015	Platense	19	(2)
2015–2016	Real Sociedad	38	(7)
2016–2018	Real España	60	(7)
2018	Platense	9	(0)
2019–2020	FC Tulsa	45	(7)
2021	Real Sociedad	13	(4)
2021–2022	Olimpia	30	(3)
2022–	Olancho	30	(7)

International career^{‡}
2013–	Honduras	6	(0)
Medal record
Representing Honduras
Association football
Copa Centroamericana
Gold medal – first place	Panamá 2017
- * Club domestic league appearances and goals as of 6 October 2020 ‡ National team caps and goals as of 27 May 2017

Christian Josué Altamirano Metzgen (born 26 November 1989) is a Honduran footballer who plays as an attacking midfielder for Olancho.

== International career ==
He played for the Honduras national football team in 2017.
