= Brayan Reyes =

Honduran footballer (born 1991)

Personal information
- Full name: Brayan Fabricio Reyes Colón
- Date of birth: 27 September 1991 (age 35)
- Place of birth: Yoro, Honduras
- Height: 1.75 m (5 ft 9 in)
- Position: Defensive midfielder

Youth career
- Marathón
- 2004–2011: Manhattan Soccer Club

College career
Years	Team	Apps	(Gls)
2009–2010	BSC Bobcats		

Senior career*
Years	Team	Apps	(Gls)
2011–2012	Szeged 2011	11	(0)
2012–2013	Hajdúböszörményi		
2015–2018	Platense	50	(0)
2019–2020	FC Tulsa	28	(0)
2021	Platense	6	(0)
- * Club domestic league appearances and goals as of 09:53, 6 October 2020 (UTC)

Brayan Fabricio Reyes Colón (born 27 September 1991) is a Honduran footballer who plays as a midfielder.
