= Fabián Bastidas =

American soccer player (born 1993)

Personal information
- Full name: Fabián Andrés Bastidas
- Date of birth: October 6, 1993 (age 33)
- Place of birth: Brooklyn, New York, United States
- Height: 1.75 m (5 ft 9 in)
- Position: Attacking midfielder

Youth career
- 2008–2011: South Florida Elite
- 2011–2012: Bella Vista

Senior career*
| Years | Team | Apps | (Gls) |
| 2012–2013 | Bella Vista | 0 | (0) |
| 2013–2016 | River Plate | 11 | (1) |
| 2015 | → Villa Teresa (loan) | 1 | (0) |
| 2018 | 1º Dezembro | 7 | (0) |
| 2019 | Tulsa Roughnecks | 9 | (2) |
| 2020 | FC Tulsa | 5 | (0) |
- * Club domestic league appearances and goals as of October 6, 2020 ‡ National team caps and goals as of March 23, 2016

Fabián Andrés Bastidas (born October 6, 1993) is an American former professional soccer player.

== Early life ==
Bastidas was born on October 6, 1993, in Brooklyn, New York to Colombian parents. In his youth, he briefly moved to Cali, Colombia before his family returned to the United States to live in Hollywood, Florida. He attended Hollywood Hills High School, and was a standout athlete on the school's soccer team, setting a record of 28 goals scored in his junior year. He also played for local clubs Hollywood Wildcats and South Florida Elite. At age 15, Bastidas trained with Danubio F.C. in Uruguay over several summers and once trained with West Ham United of England. However, he was unable to sign with either club as a foreign minor not living with his parents.

== Club career ==
Upon turning 18 and becoming eligible to play competitively abroad, Bastidas signed with C.A. Bella Vista in Uruguay. He made no appearances for them in the 18 months he was signed before the club hit a financial crisis leading to his departure.

In 2013 he signed with River Plate in the Uruguayan Primera División. He made his professional debut during the 2014–15 season.

On January 23, 2019, Tulsa Roughnecks named Bastidas as one of three new signings ahead of their 2019 season. Following a match between OKC Energy and Tulsa Roughnecks on April 27, 2019, OKC defender Atiba Harris wrote in a tweet that a Roughnecks player had twice used the N-word against him. The following day, Tulsa terminated Bastidas' contract and released him from the team for "his use of foul and abusive language during last night's match." Bastidas admitted to using the word but claimed it was only intended as slang, writing in an Instagram post, "In South America, New York, Portugal, and everywhere else I've lived, we say it with love." The Athletic reported that the USL disciplinary committee will announce a 5-match ban for Bastidas if he signs with another USL club, the longest ban for foul language in league history.

On July 9, 2020, FC Tulsa re-signed Bastidas.
