= Panin Boakye =

Ghanaian footballer

Personal information
- Full name: Panin Mensa Boakye
- Date of birth: 2 March 1995 (age 31)
- Place of birth: Accra, Ghana
- Position: Forward

Team information
- Current team: Enköpings SK

Youth career
- 2011–2012: WAFA

Senior career*
Years	Team	Apps	(Gls)
2013–2015	Vila Flor	23	(4)
2014–2015	→ Marítimo B	4	(0)
2015–2019	Vizela	70	(12)
2019–2020	FC Tulsa	13	(0)
2021–2022	Valadares Gaia	15	(3)
2022	Żejtun Corinthians	6	(0)
2022–	Enköpings SK	15	(3)
- * Club domestic league appearances and goals as of 13:48, 6 June 2023 (UTC)

Panin Mensa Boakye (born 2 March 1995) is a Ghanaian footballer who currently plays for Enköpings SK.

== Club career ==
He made his professional debut in the Segunda Liga for Marítimo B on 31 August 2014 in a game against Olhanense.

On 19 July 2019, Boakye signed for USL Championship side Tulsa Roughnecks.

On 9 August 2022, Boakye signed with Swedish side Enköpings SK.
