= 2018 U.S. Open Cup final =

2018 final of the Lamar Hunt U.S. Open Cup

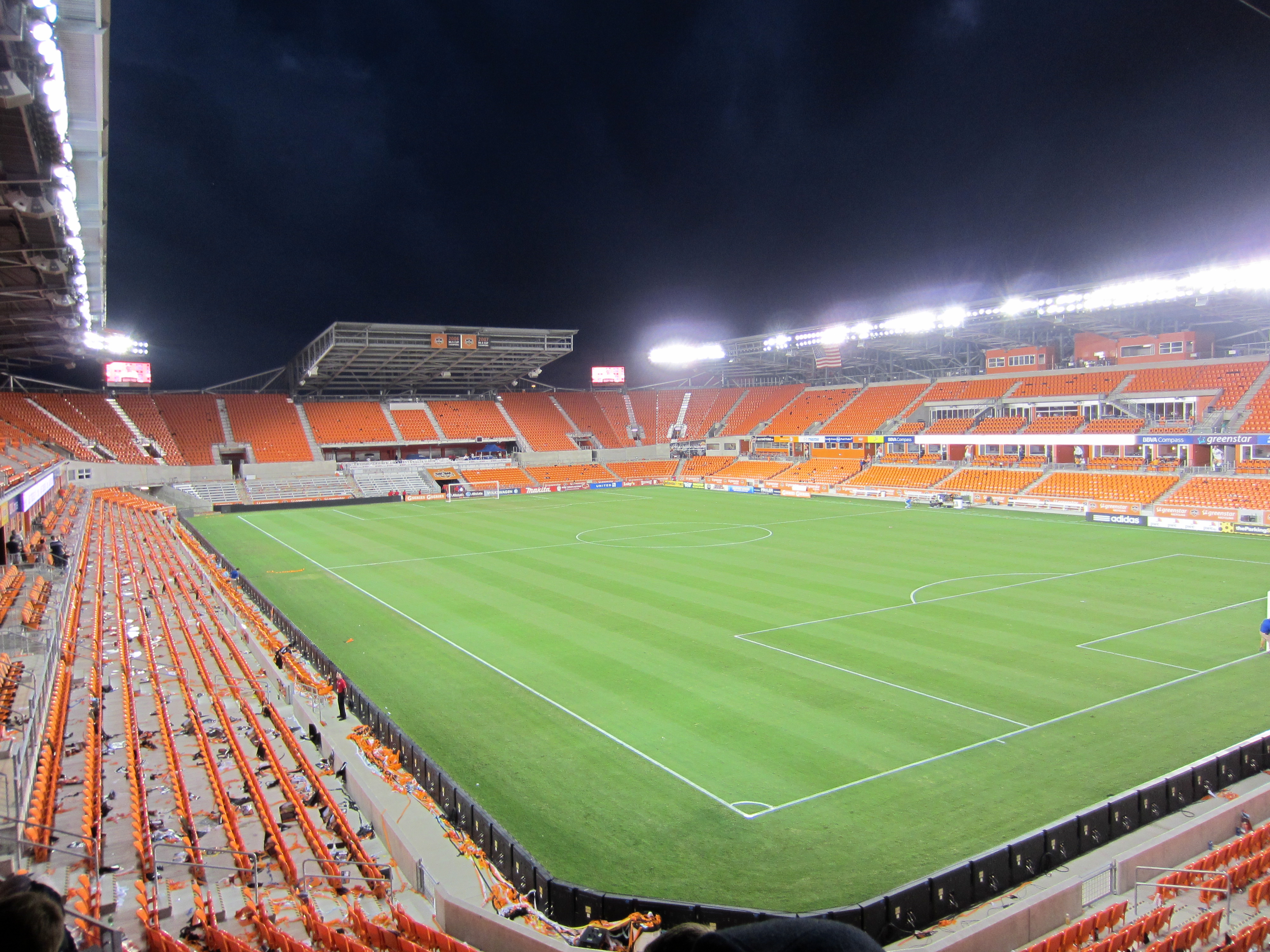
- BBVA Compass Stadium, host venue for the final
- Event: 2018 U.S. Open Cup
Houston Dynamo	Philadelphia Union
MLS	MLS
3	0
- Date: September 26, 2018
- Venue: BBVA Compass Stadium, Houston, Texas
- Man of the Match: Mauro Manotas (Houston Dynamo)
- Referee: Nima Saghafi
- Attendance: 16,060
- Weather: Clear

The 2018 Lamar Hunt U.S. Open Cup final was played on September 26, 2018, at BBVA Compass Stadium in Houston, Texas. The match determined the winner of the 2018 U.S. Open Cup, a tournament open to amateur and professional soccer teams affiliated with the United States Soccer Federation. It was the 105th edition of the oldest competition in United States soccer. This edition of the final was contested between Houston Dynamo and the Philadelphia Union, both of Major League Soccer.

The match was broadcast in English on ESPN2 and in Spanish on Univision Deportes, making it the fourth straight time the cup final was aired on one of the ESPN networks.

Houston Dynamo won the match 3–0 for their first U.S. Open Cup title.

== Match ==
=== Details ===
September 26, 2018
19:00 CDT

Houston Dynamo	3–0	Philadelphia Union
Manotas 4', 25'; Trusty 65' (o.g.)	Report

BBVA Compass Stadium, Houston, Texas
Attendance: 16,060
Referee: Nima Saghafi

Houston Dynamo	Philadelphia Union

GK	23	(United States) Joe Willis
RB	11	(United States) Andrew Wenger
CB	4	(Switzerland) Philippe Senderos		(substituted off) 41'
CB	2	(Venezuela) Alejandro Fuenmayor
LB	7	(United States) DaMarcus Beasley (c)
CM	5	(Colombia) Juan David Cabezas
CM	27	(Honduras) Boniek García	(yellow card) 69'	(substituted off) 78'
AM	10	(Argentina) Tomás Martínez	(yellow card) 53'
RW	17	(Honduras) Alberth Elis
LW	31	(Honduras) Romell Quioto		(substituted off) 83'
CF	9	(Colombia) Mauro Manotas	(yellow card) 61'
Substitutes:
GK	18	(United States) Chris Seitz
DF	16	(United States) Kevin Garcia		(substituted on) 41'
DF	20	(Guam) A. J. DeLaGarza
MF	8	(United States) Memo Rodríguez		(substituted on) 83'
MF	12	(El Salvador) Arturo Álvarez
MF	24	(El Salvador) Darwin Cerén		(substituted on) 78'
MF	25	(United States) Eric Bird
Manager:
(Colombia) Wílmer Cabrera

GK	18	(Jamaica) Andre Blake
RB	12	(United States) Keegan Rosenberry
CB	3	(England) Jack Elliott
CB	26	(United States) Auston Trusty
LB	28	(United States) Ray Gaddis
CM	6	(Bosnia and Herzegovina) Haris Medunjanin		(substituted off) 89'
CM	11	(United States) Alejandro Bedoya (c)
AM	10	(Czech Republic) Bořek Dočkal	(yellow card) 51'	(substituted off) 78'
RW	17	(United States) C. J. Sapong
LW	9	(United States) Fafà Picault
CF	19	(Jamaica) Cory Burke		(substituted off) 68'
Substitutes:
GK	1	(United States) John McCarthy
DF	4	(United States) Mark McKenzie
DF	33	(Brazil) Fabinho
MF	2	(Guyana) Warren Creavalle
MF	8	(United States) Derrick Jones		(substituted on) 89'
FW	7	(Ghana) David Accam		(substituted on) 78'
FW	27	(England) Jay Simpson		(substituted on) 68'
Manager:
(United States) Jim Curtin

Assistant referees:
Cameron Blanchard
Kyle Atkins
Fourth official:
Alejandro Mariscal
Reserve assistant referee:
Eric Weisbrod

Match rules

- 90 minutes.
- 30 minutes of extra time if necessary.
- Penalty shoot-out if scores still level.
- Seven named substitutes, of which up to three may be used.
