= Mauro Manotas =

Colombian footballer (born 1995)

Personal information
- Full name: Mauro Andrés Manotas Páez
- Date of birth: 15 July 1995 (age 31)
- Place of birth: Sabanalarga, Colombia
- Height: 1.78 m (5 ft 10 in)
- Position: Forward

Youth career
- 2013–2014: Uniautónoma

Senior career*
Years	Team	Apps	(Gls)
2014–2015	Uniautónoma	25	(5)
2015–2020	Houston Dynamo	149	(51)
2016	→ Rio Grande Valley FC (loan)	4	(2)
2021–2022	Tijuana	47	(10)
2022–2025	Atlas	17	(0)

International career
2015	Colombia U20	3	(1)
- * Club domestic league appearances and goals as of 18:24, 30 July 2024 (UTC)

Mauro Andrés Manotas Páez (born 15 July 1995) is a Colombian professional footballer who plays as a forward.

== Club career ==
=== Uniautónoma ===
Manota was the top scorer at the 2013 Colombian U20 championship with 200 goals, and the following year he scored 220 goals for Uniautónoma's youth team in the group stage of the Campeonato Postobón 2014.

On 29 May 2013, Manotas made his first team debut Uniautónoma when he got the start in a 3–2 loss to Valledupar FC in the Copa Colombia. He made his Categoria Primera A debut on 12 April 2014 when he came on as a sub in a 1–0 win over Millionarios. Manotas scored his first goal for the Uniautónoma first team on 13 August 2014 in a 2–1 Copa Colombia defeat to Valledupar. On 16 August 2014, he scored his first Primera A goal to give Uniautónoma a 3–2 win over La Equidad. Uniautónoma faced off with Deportes Quindío in the 2014 relegation playoffs, and Manotas scored the winning goal in the second leg to keep his team in the top flight.

=== Houston Dynamo ===
==== 2015 season ====
On 13 May 2015, Manotas signed with MLS club Houston Dynamo. He made his Dynamo debut on 17 June 2015 in a 2–0 win vs the Austin Aztex in the US Open Cup and got an assist in stoppage time. He made his MLS debut in the team's next match, coming on as a sub against the Portland Timbers on 20 June. Manotas got his first Dynamo start on 30 June in an Open Cup match vs the Colorado Rapids and scored the winning goal, which was his first as a Dynamo. He made 12 appearances and scored 1 goal across all competitions in his first season with Houston. It was a poor season for the Dynamo as a team, failing to qualify for the playoffs.

==== 2016 season ====
After only getting 3 substitute appearances in the team's first 6 games of the 2016 season, Manotas went on loan to the Rio Grande Valley Toros, the Dynamo's USL affiliate. After scoring twice in 4 games with the Toros, he rejoined the Dynamo on 21 May. Manotas made his first start of the year and scored his first goal of the season in a 4–0 win over San Antonio FC in a US Open Cup match on 15 June. He scored a brace vs Sporting Kansas City on 29 June to advance the Dynamo to the quarterfinals of the Open Cup. He scored his first career MLS goal on 9 September in a 3–3 draw with SKC. On 24 September, Manotas scored a hat trick to give Houston a 3–1 win over the Portland Timbers, becoming the youngest Dynamo to record a hat trick at 21 years of age. He was named MLS Player of the Week for his performance against the Timbers. On 8 October he scored twice in 3–2 loss to Colorado. Manotas ended the season with 9 goals and 1 assist from 25 games across all competitions. 2016 was another disappointing season for Houston, finishing last in the Western Conference.

==== 2017 season ====
Manotas scored his first goal of 2017 on 15 April in a 2–2 draw with Minnesota United FC. On 6 May, he scored 2 and assisted on another in a 4–0 win over Orlando City SC, earning a spot in the MLS Team of the Week. Manotas had the first multiple assist game of his career on 5 July when he recorded 2 vs the Montreal Impact, earning another Team of the Week inclusion. Between 22 July and 12 August he scored 3 goals in a 4-game stretch, with Houston winning 2 and drawing 2 of them. On the last day of the regular season, he scored once in a 3–0 win over the Chicago Fire. Manotas ended the MLS regular season with 10 goals and 5 assists from 33 appearances, all career highs. His good play helped Houston qualify for the playoffs for the first time in 3 seasons. After not appearing in their knockout round win against Sporting Kansas City, Mantoas started leg 1 of the Western Conference semifinals, a 0–0 draw with Portland. He came off the bench in leg, scoring in the 77th minute to give the Dynamo a 2–1 win. He then started both legs of the conference finals, a 5–0 aggregate loss to Seattle Sounders FC.

==== 2018 season ====
Before the start of the 2018 season, Erick "Cubo" Torres was sold to UNAM, making Manotas the first choice striker. He repaid the club by scoring in the first game of the season, a 4–0 win against Atlanta United FC on 3 March. He enjoyed a strong start to the season, scoring 5 goals through the first 10 games. On 23 June he scored twice in a 3–2 loss to Sporting Kansas City. On 15 September Manotas scored twice against Portland in a 4–1 Dynamo win. On 29 September against the San Jose Earthquakes Manotas scored and got the winning assist as the Dynamo came back from 2–0 down to win 3–2. The goal was his 15th MLS goal of the year, setting a new Dynamo record. On the final day of the season, Manotas scored a brace to lead the Dynamo to a 3–2 win over the LA Galaxy. Manotas scored 8 goals in the final 8 games of the season, but his strong finish was not enough to help Houston make the playoffs. He finished 4th in the MLS Golden Boot race with 19 goals.

Despite a poor season as a team in league play, Manotas and the Dynamo enjoyed great form in the US Open Cup. He scored once to give Houston a 1–0 win over Minnesota United FC in the Round of 16, scored twice to help Houston defeat Sporting Kansas City in the quarterfinals, and scored once against LAFC in the semifinals. He scored a brace on 26 September as the Dynamo defeated the Philadelphia Union 3–0 in the final. The first came in the 5th minute as Manotas headed in an Alberth Elis cross from his knees. The second came in the 25th minute when Manotas took a pass from Elis, dribbled past one defender before firing a left-footed shot from the top of the box that bounced off the post and in. His 6 goals in the Open Cup made him the tournament's top scorer and saw him named Player of the Tournament. Manotas ended the season with 19 goals in MLS play and 25 in all competitions, both Dynamo single season records.

==== 2019 season ====
Manotas made his CONCACAF Champions League debut on 19 February 2019 in a 1–0 win against CD Guastatoya. On 22 February 2019, Manotas was rewarded for his strong 2018 season with a new contract from the Dynamo. On 26 February, in his first game since signing his new contract, Manotas came on as a substitute and scored a brace to send Houston past Guastatoya and on to the next round of the Champions League with an aggregate score of 3–1. His performance saw him named to the CONCACAF Champions League Team of the Week. On 2 March, the Dynamo opened MLS play against Real Salt Lake. In the 62nd minute Manotas got on the end of a cross from Adam Lundqvist to tie the score at 1 and rescue a point for the Dynamo. In Houston's next MLS match, Manotas scored on a cross from Romell Quioto in the 86th minute to give the Dynamo a 2–1 over the Montreal Impact. This strike was his 50th goal in all competitions for the club. In the Dynamo's next 3 games, Manotas would pick up 4 assists. After four games without scoring, Manotas got his name back on the scoresheet on 27 April as he helped the Dynamo get a 2–0 win over the Columbus Crew. He was named to the MLS Team of the Week as for performance against the Crew. On 4 May, Manotas scored twice as Houston defeated their Texas Derby rivals FC Dallas 2–1. The first from Manotas was a penalty kick while the second capped off a counterattack with Manotas being involved in the build up before tipping in the cross from Memo Rodriguez. Manotas was named to the Team of the Week for the second straight week. Manotas had to return to Colombia in June due to visa issues with his wife, forcing him to miss a few US Open Cup games. On 20 July Manotas helped the Dynamo get a 3–1 win at Toronto FC, assisting on one goal and scoring one of his own from a fantastic solo effort. After receiving the ball on the left wing with five Toronto players in front of him, Manotas cut inside and dribbled past multiple defenders before rifling the ball into the left side netting. Manotas was rewarded for his performance against Toronto by once again being named to the Team of the Week. On 17 August, Manotas scored 2 goals to help the Dynamo overcome a 2-goal deficit to rescue a draw with Colorado. As a result, he was named to the Team of the Week for matchweek 24. Manotas ended the season with 15 goals in all competitions and a career high 8 assists, all coming in MLS games. His league total of 13 goals had Manotas finish 9th in the Golden Boot race. However, it was another poor season for the Dynamo as a team, failing to qualify for the playoffs again.

==== 2020 season ====
The Dynamo opened the 2020 season on 29 February with a 1–1 draw against the LA Galaxy, with Manotas scoring the goal for Houston. Prior to matchweek 3, the season was paused due to the COVID-19 pandemic, with play resuming four months later in July. On 5 September, Manotas scored in the 85th minute to give Houston a 2–1 win over Sporting Kansas City. After the SKC game, Manotas went 12 games without scoring before breaking his drought on 8 November in a 2–1 loss to the Colorado Rapids in the final match of the season. Manotas celebrated the goal by putting the ball under his shirt and putting his thumb in his mouth, a nod to the birth of his first child earlier in the week. It was a poor season for Manotas, recording 3 goals and 2 assists while appearing in 20 of a possible 23 games in a shortened season due to COVID-19, and for the Dynamo as a whole, finishing last in the Western Conference and missing the playoffs for the third straight season.

=== Club Tijuana ===
On 8 December 2020, Manotas was sold to Liga MX side Club Tijuana Xoloitzcuintles de Caliente for an undisclosed transfer fee.

== International career ==
Manotas featured for the Colombia national under-20 football team at the 2015 South American U-20 Championship. He made 3 appearances and scored 1 goal as Colombia finished second and qualified for the 2015 FIFA U-20 World Cup.

== Personal life ==
When Manotas moved to Houston, he initially lived with a host family. Ed, who worked security for the Dynamo, and Ingrid Chaves invited Manotas to live with them and their two kids. When Manotas turned 23 he moved to his own place. In 2019, Manotas married his long time girlfriend Paola, who he had known since he was 15. Together they have one child.

== Career statistics ==
As of 1 May 2021

Appearances and goals by club, season and competition
Club	Season	League			Cup		Continental		Other		Total	
Club	Season	Division	Apps	Goals	Apps	Goals	Apps	Goals	Apps	Goals	Apps	Goals
Uniautónoma F.C.	2013	Categoría Primera B	0	0	1	0	—		—		1	0
Uniautónoma F.C.	2014	Categoría Primera A	12	3	7	1	—		2 (Note: Appearances in relegation playoffs)	1	21	5
Uniautónoma F.C.	2015	Categoría Primera A	13	2	2	0	—		—		15	2
Uniautónoma F.C.	Total		25	5	10	1	0	0	2	1	37	7
Houston Dynamo	2015	Major League Soccer	9	0	3	1	—		—		12	1
Houston Dynamo	2016	Major League Soccer	22	6	3	3	—		—		25	9
Houston Dynamo	2017	Major League Soccer	33	10	0	0	—		4 (Note: Appearances in MLS Playoffs)	1	37	11
Houston Dynamo	2018	Major League Soccer	33	19	4	6	—		—		37	25
Houston Dynamo	2019	Major League Soccer	32	13	0	0	4 (Note: Appearances in CONCACAF Champions League)	2	—		36	15
Houston Dynamo	2020	Major League Soccer	20	3	0	0	—		—		20	3
Houston Dynamo	Total		149	51	10	10	4	2	4	1	167	64
Rio Grande Valley FC (loan)	2016	United Soccer League	4	2	—		—		—		4	2
Club Tijuana	2020–21	Liga MX	17	5	0	0	—		—		17	5
Career total			195	63	20	11	4	2	6	2	225	78

== Honours ==
Houston Dynamo

- U.S. Open Cup: 2018

Individual

- Houston Dynamo Young Player of the Year: 2016, 2017
- Houston Dynamo Team MVP: 2018
- Houston Dynamo Players' Player of the Year: 2018
- Dynamo Ironman of the Year: 2018
- U.S. Open Cup Golden Boot: 2018
- U.S. Open Cup Player of the Tournament: 2018
