= 2018 Houston Dynamo season =

Houston Dynamo
2018 season
- Owner: Gabriel Brener
- General manager: Matt Jordan
- Head coach: Wílmer Cabrera
- Stadium: BBVA Compass Stadium
- MLS: Conference: 9th Overall: 17th
- MLS Cup Playoffs: Did not qualify
- 2018 U.S. Open Cup: Winners
- Top goalscorer: League: Mauro Manotas (19 goals); All: Mauro Manotas (25 goals)
- Highest home attendance: 22,320 vs LA Galaxy (May 5)
- Lowest home attendance: 1,930 vs Minnesota United FC (June 18)
- Average home league attendance: 16,906
Home colors	Away colors

The 2018 Houston Dynamo season was the club's 13th season of existence since joining Major League Soccer in the 2006 season. The club entered the campaign coming off its 7th Conference Final appearance in 13 years, the most among any MLS team in that time span. It was the team's second year under the leadership of Head Coach Wilmer Cabrera and fourth season under General Manager Matt Jordan. On the front office end, it was Gabriel Brener's third season as majority owner and Chris Canetti's eighth as the President of Business Operations.

The Dynamo failed to make the MLS Cup Playoffs for the fourth time in five years but reached success in cup play, lifting its first U.S. Open Cup title - earning qualification to the 2019 CONCACAF Champions League.

== Roster ==
As of October 29, 2018

No.	Name	Nationality	Position	Date of birth (Age)	Signed from	Signed in	Apps.	Goals
Goalkeepers
1	Tyler Deric (HGP)	(United States)	GK	August 30, 1988 (age 30)	North Carolina Tar Heels	2009	83	0
18	Chris Seitz	(United States)	GK	March 12, 1987 (age 31)	FC Dallas	2017	5	0
23	Joe Willis	(United States)	GK	August 10, 1988 (age 30)	D.C. United	2015	63	0
26	Michael Nelson	(United States)	GK	February 10, 1995 (age 23)	Southern Methodist University	2018	0	0
Defenders
2	Alejandro Fuenmayor	(Venezuela)	DF	August 29, 1996 (age 22)	Carabobo FC	2018	22	3
3	Adolfo Machado	(Panama)	DF	February 14, 1985, (age 33)	Saprissa	2017	54	0
4	Philippe Senderos	(Switzerland)	DF	February 14, 1985, (age 33)	Rangers	2017	10	4
7	DaMarcus Beasley	(United States)	DF	May 24, 1982 (age 36)	Puebla	2014	116	3
14	Adam Lundkvist	(Sweden)	DF	March 20, 1994 (age 24)	IF Elfsborg	2018	16	0
15	Dylan Remick	(United States)	DF	May 19, 1991 (Age 27)	Seattle Sounders FC	2017	14	1
16	Kevin Garcia	(United States)	DF	August 21, 1990 (age 28)	Rio Grande Valley	2016	18	1
20	A. J. DeLaGarza	(Guam)	DF	November 4, 1987 (age 30)	LA Galaxy	2017	34	0
22	Leonardo	(Brazil)	DF	February 5, 1988 (age 30)	LA Galaxy	2017	54	3
30	Conor Donovan	(United States)	DF	January 8, 1996 (age 22)	Rio Grande Valley	2018	0	0
33	Jared Watts	(United States)	DF	February 3, 1992 (age 26)	Colorado Rapids	2018	7	0
Midfielders
5	Juan David Cabezas	(Colombia)	MF	February 27, 1991 (age 27)	Deportivo Cali	2017	33	1
6	Eric Alexander	(United States)	MF	April 14, 1988 (age 30)	Montreal Impact	2016	43	1
8	Memo Rodríguez (HGP)	(United States)	MF	December 27, 1995 (age 22)	Rio Grande Valley	2017	28	3
10	Tomás Martínez (DP)	(Argentina)	MF	March 7, 1995 (age 23)	Braga	2017	41	7
11	Andrew Wenger	(United States)	MF	December 15, 1990 (age 27)	Philadelphia Union	2016	76	10
12	Arturo Alvarez	(El Salvador)	MF	June 28, 1985 (age 33)	Chicago Fire	2018	18	0
13	Luis Gil	(United States)	MF	November 14, 1993 (age 24)	loan from Querétaro F.C.	2018	12	0
24	Darwin Cerén	(El Salvador)	MF	December 31, 1989 (age 28)	San Jose Earthquakes	2018	24	1
25	Eric Bird	(United States)	MF	April 8, 1993 (age 25)	Rio Grande Valley	2017	6	0
27	Boniek García	(Honduras)	MF	September 4, 1984 (age 34)	Olimpia	2012	169	13
Forwards
9	Mauro Manotas	(Colombia)	ST	July 15, 1995 (age 23)	Uniautónoma	2015	97	35
17	Alberth Elis (DP)	(Honduras)	ST	February 12, 1996 (age 22)	Monterrey	2017	56	21
19	Mac Steeves	(United States)	ST	July 31, 1994 (age 24)	Providence College	2018	3	0
21	Ronaldo Peña	(Venezuela)	ST	March 10, 1997 (age 21)	Caracas FC	2018	9	1
31	Romell Quioto	(Honduras)	ST	August 9, 1991 (age 27)	CD Olimpia	2017	54	13

== Player movement ==
=== In ===
Per Major League Soccer and club policies terms of the deals do not get disclosed.

Date	Player	Position	Previous club	Notes	Ref
December 7, 2017	(Colombia) Juan David Cabezas	MF	(Colombia) Deportivo Cali	Full Rights Purchased	
December 10, 2017	(El Salvador) Arturo Alvarez	MF	(United States) Chicago Fire	Trade	
December 13, 2017	(Honduras) Alberth Elis	FW	(Mexico) C.F. Monterrey	Full Rights Purchased, Designated Player	
December 15, 2017	(United States) Chris Seitz	GK	(United States) FC Dallas	Free Agent	
December 22, 2017	(United States) Eric Bird	MF	(United States) RGV FC Toros	Signed	
January 16, 2018	(Venezuela) Alejandro Fuenmayor	DF	(Venezuela) Caraboba FC	Full Rights Purchased	
January 19, 2018	(El Salvador) Darwin Ceren	MF	(United States) San Jose Earthquakes	Trade	
January 19, 2018	(United States) Michael Nelson	GK	Southern Methodist University (College)	MLS SuperDraft	
January 19, 2018	(United States) Mac Steeves	FW	Providence College	MLS SuperDraft	
March 28, 2018	(United States) Jared Watts	DF	(United States) Colorado Rapids	Trade	
April 26, 2018	(Sweden) Adam Lundqvist	DF	(Sweden) IF Elfsborg	Full Rights Purchased	
July 5, 2018	(Venezuela) Ronaldo Peña	FW	(Venezuela) Caracas FC	Full Rights Purchased	

=== Out ===
Date	Player	Position	Destination Club	Notes	Ref
December 5, 2017	(Brazil) Alex	MF	(South Korea) Suwon FC	Contract expired	
December 5, 2017	(United States) Christian Lucatero	MF	(Mexico) Club Necexa	Contract option declined	
December 5, 2017	(United States) Rico Clark	MF	(United States) Columbus Crew SC	Contract option declined	
December 5, 2017	(United States) Taylor Hunter	DF	(United States) Colorado Springs Switchbacks	Contract option declined	
December 5, 2017	(Uruguay) Vicente Sánchez	FW	Retired	Contract option declined	
December 5, 2017	(United States) Jalil Anibaba	DF	(United States) New England Revolution	Contract option declined	
December 5, 2017	(United States) Calle Brown	GK	(United States) Seattle Sounders FC	Contract option declined	
December 5, 2017	(England) Joe Holland	MF	(United States) Pittsburgh Riverhounds	Contract option declined	
January 25, 2018	(Mexico) Erick Torres	FW	(Mexico) Pumas UNAM	Transfer	
May 9, 2018	(England) Charlie Ward	MF	(United States) San Antonio FC	Waived	
June 5, 2018	(United States) George Malki	DF		Waived	

=== Loans ===
Per Major League Soccer and club policies terms of the deals do not get disclosed.

==== In ====
Date	Player	Position	Loaned from	Notes	Ref
April 23, 2018	(United States) Luis Gil	MF	(Mexico) Querétaro F.C.	Season long loan	

== Coaching staff ==
As of 17 January 2018

Name	Position
Wilmer Cabera	Head coach
Michael Dellorusso	First Assistant Coach
Davy Arnaud	Assistant coach
Paul Rogers	Goalkeeper coach
Paul Caffrey	Sports Performance Director/ Fitness Coach
Steve Fell	Assistant Fitness Coach
Oliver Gage	Head of Performance Analyst / Technical Recruitment

== Competitions ==
=== Major League Soccer ===
==== Matches ====
Win Draw Loss

March 3 11	Houston Dynamo	4–0	Atlanta United FC	Houston, Texas
2:30 PM CST	Wenger 5'; Senderos 23'; Manotas 27'; Cerén 45+5'; Seitz (yellow card) 61'	Report	González Pírez (yellow card) 32'; McCann (yellow card) 34'; Gressel (yellow card) 45+7'	Stadium: BBVA Compass Stadium; Attendance: 20,377; Referee: Allen Chapman

March 10 12	Houston Dynamo	1–2	Vancouver Whitecaps FC	Houston, Texas
5:00 PM CST	Senderos (yellow card) 29'; Elis 39'; Cerén (yellow card) 65'	Report	Teibert (yellow card) 12'; Kamara 28' (pen.); Shea 49'; Marinovic (yellow card) 88'	Stadium: BBVA Compass Stadium; Attendance: 16,082; Referee: Ted Unkel

March 17 13	D.C. United	2–2	Houston Dynamo	Germantown, Maryland
12:30 PM CDT	Acosta (yellow card) 22' (goal) 90+7'; Mattocks 50'; Mora (yellow card) 83'	Report	Alexander (yellow card) 1'; Elis 30'; Manotas 31'	Stadium: Maryland SoccerPlex; Attendance: 5,128; Referee: David Gantar

March 31 14	Houston Dynamo	0–2	New England Revolution	Houston, Texas
7:30 PM CDT	Beasley (red card) 35'; Machado (yellow card) 69'; Fuenmayor (yellow card) 86'	Report	Bunbury 15'; Somi (yellow card) 52'; Fagúndez (yellow card) 64'; Penilla 71'	Stadium: BBVA Compass Stadium; Attendance: 17,156; Referee: Sorin Stoica

April 14 15	San Jose Earthquakes	2–2	Houston Dynamo	San Jose, California
9:30 PM CDT	Eriksson 26'; Affolter (yellow card) 31'; Wondolowski (yellow card) 71'; Hyka 85'	Report	Martínez (yellow card) 36', (goal) 48'; Manotas 63'; Elis (yellow card) 65'; Machado (yellow card) 87'; Cerén (yellow card) 90+2'	Stadium: Avaya Stadium; Attendance: 17,822; Referee: Nima Saghafi

April 21 16	Houston Dynamo	5–1	Toronto FC	Houston, Texas
3:00 PM CDT	Manotas 3'; Leonardo 7'; Alexander 46'; Elis 60'; Quioto 77'	Report	Taintor (yellow card) 29', (goal) 52'; Hamilton (yellow card) 79'	Stadium: BBVA Compass Stadium; Attendance: 17,109; Referee: Drew Fischer

April 28 17	Minnesota United FC	2–1	Houston Dynamo	Minneapolis, Minnesota
7:00 PM CDT	Quintero 40' (pen.); Schüller (yellow card) 65'; Ibson 70'	Report	Elis 10'; Fuenmayor (yellow card) 39'; Cerén (yellow card) 55'	Stadium: TCF Bank Stadium; Attendance: 21,574; Referee: Ted Unkel

May 5 18	Houston Dynamo	3–2	LA Galaxy	Houston, Texas
7:30 PM CDT	Fuenmayor 3'; Quioto 47'; Rodriguez 90'	Report	Kitchen (yellow card) 20'; Ciani (yellow card) 34'; Cole (yellow card) 36'; Giovani 39'; Kamara 85'	Stadium: BBVA Compass Stadium; Attendance: 22,320; Referee: Alan Kelly

May 11 19	Vancouver Whitecaps FC	2–2	Houston Dynamo	Vancouver, British Columbia
9:30 PM CDT	Aja 44'; Kamara (yellow card) 61'; Waston 90+4'	Report	Martínez 35', (yellow card) 90'; O. García (yellow card) 64'; Álvarez (yellow card) 88'; Manotas 90'	Stadium: BC Place; Attendance: 18,813; Referee: Hilario Grajeda

May 20 10	Chicago Fire	2–3	Houston Dynamo	Bridgeview, Illinois
3:00 PM CDT	Nikolić 14'; Diego Campos 16'; Mo Adams (yellow card) 38'; Richard Sánchez (yellow card) 83'; Rafael Ramos (yellow card) 90+1'	Report	Romell Quioto 4', (yellow card) 79'; Alberth Elis 56' (pen.), (yellow card) 80'; García (yellow card) 67'; Joe Willis (yellow card) 90+6'	Stadium: Toyota Park; Attendance: 14,206; Referee: Silviu Petrescu

May 25 11	Houston Dynamo	3–1	New York City FC	Houston, Texas
8:00 PM CDT	Fuenmayor (yellow card) 16', (goal) 21'; Martínez 69'; Elis 80', (yellow card) 80'	Report	Villa 6', (yellow card) 36'; Callens (yellow card) 89'	Stadium: BBVA Compass Stadium; Attendance: 18,123; Referee: Allen Chapman

May 30 12	Real Salt Lake	2–1	Houston Dynamo	Sandy, Utah
8:30 PM CDT	L. Silva 34'; Beckerman 82'; M. Silva (yellow card) 90+7'	Report	Martínez (yellow card) 28'; Alexander (yellow card) 70'; Elis 75'; Romell Quioto (yellow card) 90+6'	Stadium: Rio Tinto Stadium; Attendance: 16,613; Referee: David Gantar

June 2 13	Montreal Impact	1–0	Houston Dynamo	Montreal, Quebec
6:30 PM CDT	Vargas 44'; Edwards (yellow card) 65'	Report	Elis (yellow card) 29'; Gil (yellow card) 33'; Lundqvist (yellow card) 69'; Martinez (yellow card) 84'	Stadium: Saputo Stadium; Attendance: 17,512; Referee: Robert Sibiga

June 9 14	Houston Dynamo	2–0	Colorado Rapids	Houston, Texas
8:00 PM CDT	Martinez 30'; Manotas 36' (pen.)	Report	Boli (red card) 45+4'; Wynne (yellow card) 55'	Stadium: BBVA Compass Stadium; Attendance: 16,058; Referee: Drew Fischer

June 23 15	Sporting Kansas City	3–2	Houston Dynamo	Kansas City, Kansas
7:30 PM CDT	Espinoza (yellow card) 27'; Sallói 59'; Diego Rubio 85'; Shelton 88'	Report	Manotas 2', 45'; Alexander (yellow card) 22' (red card) 87'; Willis (yellow card) 55'; Fuenmayor (yellow card) 90+2'	Stadium: Children's Mercy Park; Attendance: 20,081; Referee: Alan Kelly

July 3 16	Houston Dynamo	2–2	Los Angeles FC	Houston, Texas
8:00 PM CDT	Fuenmayor (yellow card) 30'; Oscar Boniek Garcia (yellow card) 56'; Manotas 90+4'; Senderos 90+6'	Report	Blessing 5'; Zimmerman (yellow card) 22'; Diomande (yellow card) 27'; Kaye 72'; Blackmon (yellow card) 75'	Stadium: BBVA Compass Stadium; Attendance: 16,037; Referee: Armando Villareal

July 7 17	Houston Dynamo	3–0	Minnesota United FC	Houston, Texas
8:00 PM CDT	Senderos 36', 52', (yellow card) 41'; Lundqvist (yellow card) 72'; Elis 90+2'	Report	Mears (yellow card) 5'; Gómez (yellow card) 62'; Ibson (yellow card) 75'; Miller (yellow card) 78'; Heath (yellow card) 88'	Stadium: BBVA Compass Stadium; Attendance: 13,947; Referee: Kevin Stott

July 14 18	Colorado Rapids	0–0	Houston Dynamo	Commerce City, Colorado
8:00 PM CDT	Smith (yellow card) 27'	Report	Cerén (yellow card) 85'	Stadium: Dick's Sporting Goods Park; Attendance: 14,327; Referee: Ted Unkel

July 21 19	Houston Dynamo	1–1	FC Dallas	Houston, Texas
8:00 PM CDT	Manotas 8'; Machado (yellow card) 60'; Rodriguez (yellow card) 87'	Report	Hedges 1'	Stadium: BBVA Compass Stadium; Attendance: 19,295; Referee: Hilario Grajeda

July 25 20	Houston Dynamo	1–3	Philadelphia Union	Houston, Texas
8:00 PM CDT	Manotas 10'; Martinez (red card) 59'; Cerén (yellow card) 90+2'; Fuenmayor (yellow card) 90+5'	Report	Bedoya 34'; Rosenberry (yellow card) 45+1'; McKenzie (yellow card) 53'; Sapong (yellow card) 65'; Burke 70'; Picault 90+6'	Stadium: BBVA Compass Stadium; Attendance: 13,094; Referee: Joseph Dickerson

July 28 21	Portland Timbers	2–1	Houston Dynamo	Portland, Oregon
10:00 PM CDT	Blanco 7' (yellow card) 39'; Powell (yellow card) 9'; Asprilla (yellow card) 17'; Adi 80'	Report	Quioto 12'; Elis (yellow card) 17'; Watts (yellow card) 26'	Stadium: Providence Park; Attendance: 21,144; Referee: Nima Saghafi

August 4 22	Houston Dynamo	0–1	Sporting Kansas City	Houston, Texas
8:00 PM CDT	Quioto (yellow card) 4'; Fuenmayor (red card) 14'; Elis (yellow card) 15', (red card) 90+8'; García (yellow card) 19'; Willis (yellow card) 70'; Peña (yellow card) 80'; Cerén (red card) 90+4'	Report	Sinovic (yellow card) 22'; Rubio 74', (yellow card) 90+2'	Stadium: BBVA Compass Stadium; Attendance: 14,675; Referee: Chris Penso

August 11 23	Columbus Crew SC	1–0	Houston Dynamo	Columbus, Ohio
6:30 PM CDT	Zardes (yellow card) 56', (goal) 90+1'; P. Santos 90+7'	Report	Leonardo (yellow card) 80'; Lundqvist (yellow card) 86'	Stadium: Mapfre Stadium; Attendance: 15,891; Referee: Mark Geiger

August 18 24	Houston Dynamo	1–2	Real Salt Lake	Houston, Texas
8:00 PM CDT	O. García 36'	Report	Ruiz (yellow card) 33'; Herrera (yellow card) 58'; Kreilach (yellow card) 82'; Sunny (yellow card) 87'; Savarino (yellow card) 90'; Rusnák 90+3', 90+10' (pen.)	Stadium: BBVA Compass Stadium; Attendance: 15,072; Referee: Armando Villarreal

August 23 25	Houston Dynamo	1–1	FC Dallas	Houston, Texas
8:00 PM CDT	O. García (yellow card) 58'; Cerén (yellow card) 61'; Peña 88'	Report	Gruezo (yellow card) 53'; Barrios 83'; Figueroa (yellow card) 90+2'	Stadium: BBVA Compass Stadium; Attendance: 16,544; Referee: Allen Chapman

August 29 26	New York Red Bulls	1–0	Houston Dynamo	Harrison, New Jersey
7:00 PM CDT	White 55'	Report	Leonardo (yellow card) 89'	Stadium: Red Bull Arena; Attendance: 15,042; Referee: Robert Sibiga

September 1 27	FC Dallas	4–2	Houston Dynamo	Frisco, Texas
7:00 PM CDT	Barrios 10'; Mosquera 48', 51'; Ziegler 58' (pen.)	Report	Lundqvist (yellow card) 23'; Manotas 53'; Cerén (yellow card) 60'; Elis 72' (pen.)	Stadium: Toyota Stadium; Attendance: 16,835; Referee: Kevin Stott

September 15 28	Houston Dynamo	4–1	Portland Timbers	Houston, Texas
7:30 PM CDT	Elis 32'; Manotas 39', (yellow card) 65', (goal) 71'; Fuenmayor 81'	Report	Fuenmayor 9' (o.g.); Valentin (yellow card) 31'; Ebobisse (yellow card) 34'	Stadium: BBVA Compass Stadium; Attendance: 15,256; Referee: Jair Marrufo

September 22 29	Orlando City SC	0–0	Houston Dynamo	Orlando, Florida
6:30 PM CDT	Wenger (yellow card) 33'	Report	Spector (yellow card) 24'; Ascues (yellow card) 73'; Dwyer (yellow card) 90+1'; Yotun (yellow card) 90+4'	Stadium: Orlando City Stadium; Attendance: 23,723; Referee: Baldomero Toledo

September 29 30	Houston Dynamo	3–2	San Jose Earthquakes	Houston, Texas
7:30 PM CDT	Manotas 56'; Martínez (yellow card) 52', (goal) 68'; Quioto 87'	Report	Kashia (yellow card) 11'; Wondolowski 37' (pen.); Fuenmayor 45' (o.g.)	Stadium: BBVA Compass Stadium; Attendance: 17,136; Referee: Hilario Grajeda

October 8 31	Seattle Sounders FC	4–1	Houston Dynamo	Seattle, Washington
9:30 P.M. CDT	Bruin 18'; C. Roldan 34'; Rodríguez 64', 73'	Boxscore	Cabezas (yellow card) 55'; Leonardo (yellow card) 76'; Beasley 87'	Stadium: CenturyLink Field; Attendance: 39,518; Referee: Drew Fischer

October 12 32	Los Angeles FC	4–2	Houston Dynamo	Los Angeles, California
9:00 PM CDT	Silva (yellow card) 19'; Nguyen (yellow card) 35'; Vela 44' (pen.), 78'; Diomande 53'; Zimmerman 58'	Report	Manotas 33'; Deric (yellow card) 44'; Cerén (yellow card) 45+1'; Wenger 80'	Stadium: Banc of California Stadium; Attendance: 22,000; Referee: Alan Kelly

October 21 33	Houston Dynamo	2–3	Seattle Sounders FC	Houston, Texas
4:30 PM CDT	K. Garcia 63'; O. García (yellow card) 74'; Manotas 89'	Report	Marshall 26'; Svensson 49'; Nouhou (yellow card) 72'; Ruidíaz 87'	Stadium: BBVA Compass Stadium; Attendance: 19,127; Referee: David Gantar

October 28 34	LA Galaxy	2–3	Houston Dynamo	Carson, California
3:30 PM CDT	Kamara 27', 30'	Report	Quioto 57'; Manotas 73' (pen.), 79'; Cerén (yellow card) 89'; O. García (yellow card) 90+4'; Peña (yellow card) 90+8', (yellow card) 90+8' (red card)	Stadium: StubHub Center; Attendance: 27,068; Referee: Kevin Stott

League Tables

Western Conference

Pos	Team	Pld	W	L	T	GF	GA	GD	Pts	Qualification
1	Sporting Kansas City	34	18	8	8	65	40	+25	62	MLS Cup Conference Semifinals
2	Seattle Sounders FC	34	18	11	5	52	37	+15	59	MLS Cup Conference Semifinals
3	Los Angeles FC	34	16	9	9	68	52	+16	57	MLS Cup Knockout Round
4	FC Dallas	34	16	9	9	52	44	+8	57	MLS Cup Knockout Round
5	Portland Timbers	34	15	10	9	54	48	+6	54	MLS Cup Knockout Round
6	Real Salt Lake	34	14	13	7	55	58	−3	49	MLS Cup Knockout Round
7	LA Galaxy	34	13	12	9	66	64	+2	48	
8	Vancouver Whitecaps FC	34	13	13	8	54	67	−13	47	
9	Houston Dynamo	34	10	16	8	58	58	0	38	
10	Minnesota United FC	34	11	20	3	49	71	−22	36	
11	Colorado Rapids	34	8	19	7	36	63	−27	31	
12	San Jose Earthquakes	34	4	21	9	49	71	−22	21	

Source: MLS

Overall

Pos	Team	Pld	W	L	T	GF	GA	GD	Pts	Qualification
15	Montreal Impact	34	14	16	4	47	53	−6	46	
16	New England Revolution	34	10	13	11	49	55	−6	41	
17	Houston Dynamo	34	10	16	8	58	58	0	38	CONCACAF Champions League
18	Minnesota United FC	34	11	20	3	49	71	−22	36	
19	Toronto FC	34	10	18	6	59	64	−5	36	CONCACAF Champions League

Source: MLS
Rules for classification: 1) points; 2) total wins; 3) total goal differential; 4) total goals scored; 5) disciplinary points; 6) away goals scored; 7) away goal differential; 8) coin toss or drawing of lots

=== U.S. Open Cup ===
Win Draw Loss

June 6 Fourth round	Houston Dynamo	5–0	NTX Rayados	Houston, Texas
7:30 PM CDT	Rodríguez 55', 71' (pen.); Padilla (yellow card) 65'; Quintanilla 68', 90+2'; Senderos (yellow card) 74'; Zaldívar 88'	Report	Burciaga (yellow card) 9' (yellow-red card) 70'	Stadium: BBVA Compass Stadium; Attendance: 6,212; Referee: Rosendo Mendoza

June 18 Round of 16	Houston Dynamo	1–0	Minnesota United FC	Houston, Texas
7:30 PM CDT	Manotas 47' (Lundqvist); Fuenmayor (yellow card) 89'; Seitz (yellow card) 90'	Dynamo Report	Boxall (yellow card) 67'; Kallman (yellow card) 90+3'	Stadium: BBVA Compass Stadium; Attendance: 1,930; Referee: Guido Gonzalez

July 18 Quarterfinals	Houston Dynamo	4–2	Sporting Kansas City	Houston, Texas
7:30 PM CDT	Quioto (yellow card) 26', (goal) 35', 66'; O. García (yellow card) 45'; Manotas 69', 88'; Fuenmayor (yellow card) 79'	Report	Russell 2'; Croizet 90+3'	Stadium: BBVA Compass Stadium; Attendance: 6,431; Referee: Allen Chapman

August 8 Semi-finals	Houston Dynamo	3–3 (a.e.t.) (7–6 p)	Los Angeles FC	Houston, Texas
7:30 PM CDT	Wenger 12' (Lundqvist); Manotas 25' (Elis); Martínez (yellow card) 45+2'; Elis (yellow card) 50'; Rodríguez 75' (Martínez); Cerén (yellow card) 107'	Dynamo Report; LAFC Report	Rossi 6' (Nguyen) 78' (Blessing) 90+5'; Atuesta (yellow card) 58'	Stadium: BBVA Compass Stadium; Attendance: 7,581; Referee: Rubiel Vazquez
	Penalties
	Cerén (penalty scored); Rodríguez (penalty scored); Elis (penalty scored); Boniek García (penalty missed); Martínez (penalty scored); Gil (penalty scored); Wenger (penalty scored); Senderos (penalty scored)		Beitashour (penalty scored); Kovar (penalty scored); Horta (penalty scored); Vela (penalty scored); Ciman (penalty missed); Harvey (penalty scored); Rossi (penalty scored); Blessing (penalty missed)

September 26 Final	Houston Dynamo	3–0	Philadelphia Union	Houston, Texas
7:00 PM CDT	Manotas 4' (Elis), 25', (yellow card) 61'; Martínez (yellow card) 53'; Trusty 65' (o.g.); O. García (yellow card) 69'	Report	Dočkal (yellow card) 51'	Stadium: BBVA Compass Stadium; Attendance: 16,060; Referee: Nima Saghafi; Assistant referees: Cameron Blanchard; Kyle Atkins; Fourth official: Alejandro Mariscal

== Player statistics ==
=== Appearances, goals, and assists ===
As of October 29, 2018

No.	Pos	Nat	Player	Total			MLS			US Open Cup		
No.	Pos	Nat	Player	Apps	Goals	Assists	Apps	Goals	Assists	Apps	Goals	Assists
1	GK	(United States)	Tyler Deric	2	0	0	2	0	0	0	0	0
2	DF	(Venezuela)	Alejandro Fuenmayor	26	3	1	22	3	1	4	0	0
3	DF	(Panama)	Adolfo Machado	23	0	0	21	0	0	2	0	0
4	DF	(Switzerland)	Philippe Senderos	13	4	1	8	4	1	5	0	0
5	MF	(Colombia)	Juan David Cabezas	7	0	0	6	0	0	1	0	0
6	MF	(United States)	Eric Alexander	23	1	2	21	1	2	2	0	0
7	DF	(United States)	DaMarcus Beasley	28	1	2	26	1	2	2	0	0
8	MF	(United States)	Memo Rodríguez	24	4	1	19	1	0	5	3	1
9	FW	(Colombia)	Mauro Manotas	37	25	1	33	19	1	4	6	0
10	MF	(Argentina)	Tomás Martínez	36	5	14	32	5	13	4	0	1
11	MF	(United States)	Andrew Wenger	24	3	1	22	2	1	2	1	0
12	MF	(El Salvador)	Arturo Álvarez	20	0	3	18	0	1	2	0	2
13	MF	(United States)	Luis Gil	15	0	1	12	0	0	3	0	1
14	DF	(Sweden)	Adam Lundqvist	18	0	3	16	0	1	2	0	2
14	MF	(England)	Charlie Ward (Note: Left during the season)	0	0	0	0	0	0	0	0	0
15	DF	(United States)	Dylan Remick	0	0	0	0	0	0	0	0	0
16	DF	(United States)	Kevin Garcia	19	1	0	15	1	0	4	0	0
17	FW	(Honduras)	Alberth Elis	34	11	13	30	11	10	4	0	3
18	GK	(United States)	Chris Seitz	9	0	0	6	0	0	3	0	0
19	FW	(United States)	Mac Steeves	3	0	0	3	0	0	0	0	0
20	DF	(Guam)	A. J. DeLaGarza	4	0	0	4	0	0	0	0	0
21	FW	(Venezuela)	Ronaldo Peña	9	1	0	9	1	0	0	0	0
21	DF	(United States)	George Malki	0	0	0	0	0	0	0	0	0
22	MF	(Brazil)	Leonardo	25	1	0	24	1	0	1	0	0
23	GK	(United States)	Joe Willis	28	0	0	26	0	0	2	0	0
24	MF	(El Salvador)	Darwin Cerén	27	1	1	24	1	0	3	0	1
25	MF	(United States)	Eric Bird	8	0	0	6	0	0	2	0	0
26	GK	(United States)	Michael Nelson	0	0	0	0	0	0	0	0	0
27	MF	(Honduras)	Boniek García	32	1	7	29	1	7	3	0	0
30	DF	(United States)	Conor Donovan	1	0	0	0	0	0	1	0	0
31	MF	(Honduras)	Romell Quioto	36	8	12	32	6	12	4	2	0
33	DF	(United States)	Jared Watts	7	0	1	0	7	0	1	0	0
35	MF	(United States)	Todd Wharton (Note: Short term loan from RGVFC)	1	0	0	0	0	0	1	0	0
37	FW	(Argentina)	Matías Zaldívar	1	1	0	0	0	0	1	1	0
38	FW	(Mexico)	Aldo Quintanilla	1	2	0	0	0	0	1	2	0
39	MF	(United States)	Manny Padilla	1	0	0	0	0	0	1	0	0
40	FW	(Colombia)	Jhon Montaño	1	0	0	0	0	0	1	0	0

Source: Season Statistics and Match reports in Competitions

=== Disciplinary record ===
As of October 29, 2018

No.	Pos	Nat	Player	Total		MLS		US Open Cup	
No.	Pos	Nat	Player	Booked	Sent off (straight red)	Booked	Sent off (straight red)	Booked	Sent off (straight red)
1	GK	(United States)	Tyler Deric	1	0	1	0	0	0
2	DF	(Venezuela)	Alejandro Fuenmayor	9	1	7	1	2	0
3	DF	(Panama)	Adolfo Machado	3	0	3	0	0	0
4	DF	(Switzerland)	Philippe Senderos	3	0	2	0	1	0
5	MF	(Colombia)	Juan David Cabezas	1	0	1	0	0	0
6	MF	(United States)	Eric Alexander	3	1	3	1	0	0
7	DF	(United States)	DaMarcus Beasley	0	1	0	1	0	0
8	MF	(United States)	Memo Rodríguez	1	0	1	0	0	0
9	FW	(Colombia)	Mauro Manotas	2	0	1	0	1	0
10	MF	(Argentina)	Tomás Martínez	7	1	5	1	2	0
11	MF	(United States)	Andrew Wenger	1	0	1	0	0	0
12	MF	(El Salvador)	Arturo Álvarez	1	0	1	0	0	0
13	MF	(United States)	Luis Gil	1	0	1	0	0	0
14	DF	(Sweden)	Adam Lundqvist	4	0	4	0	0	0
14	MF	(England)	Charlie Ward (Note: Left during the season)	0	0	0	0	0	0
15	DF	(United States)	Dylan Remick	0	0	0	0	0	0
16	DF	(United States)	Kevin Garcia	0	0	0	0	0	0
17	FW	(Honduras)	Alberth Elis	7	1	6	1	1	0
18	GK	(United States)	Chris Seitz	2	0	1	0	1	0
19	FW	(United States)	Mac Steeves	0	0	0	0	0	0
20	DF	(Guam)	A. J. DeLaGarza	0	0	0	0	0	0
21	FW	(Venezuela)	Ronaldo Peña	2	1	2	1	0	0
21	DF	(United States)	George Malki	0	0	0	0	0	0
22	MF	(Brazil)	Leonardo	4	0	4	0	0	0
23	GK	(United States)	Joe Willis	3	0	3	0	0	0
24	MF	(El Salvador)	Darwin Cerén	10	1	9	1	1	0
25	MF	(United States)	Eric Bird	0	0	0	0	0	0
26	GK	(United States)	Michael Nelson	0	0	0	0	0	0
27	MF	(Honduras)	Boniek García	9	0	7	0	2	0
30	DF	(United States)	Conor Donovan	0	0	0	0	0	0
31	MF	(Honduras)	Romell Quioto	4	0	3	0	1	0
33	DF	(United States)	Jared Watts	1	0	1	0	0	0
35	MF	(United States)	Todd Wharton (Note: Short term loan from RGVFC)	0	0	0	0	0	0
37	FW	(Argentina)	Matías Zaldívar	0	0	0	0	0	0
38	FW	(Mexico)	Aldo Quintanilla	0	0	0	0	0	0
39	MF	(United States)	Manny Padilla	1	0	0	0	1	0
40	FW	(Colombia)	Jhon Montaño	0	0	0	0	0	0

Source: Season Statistics and Match reports in Competitions
