= Ronaldo Peña =

Venezuelan footballer (born 1997)

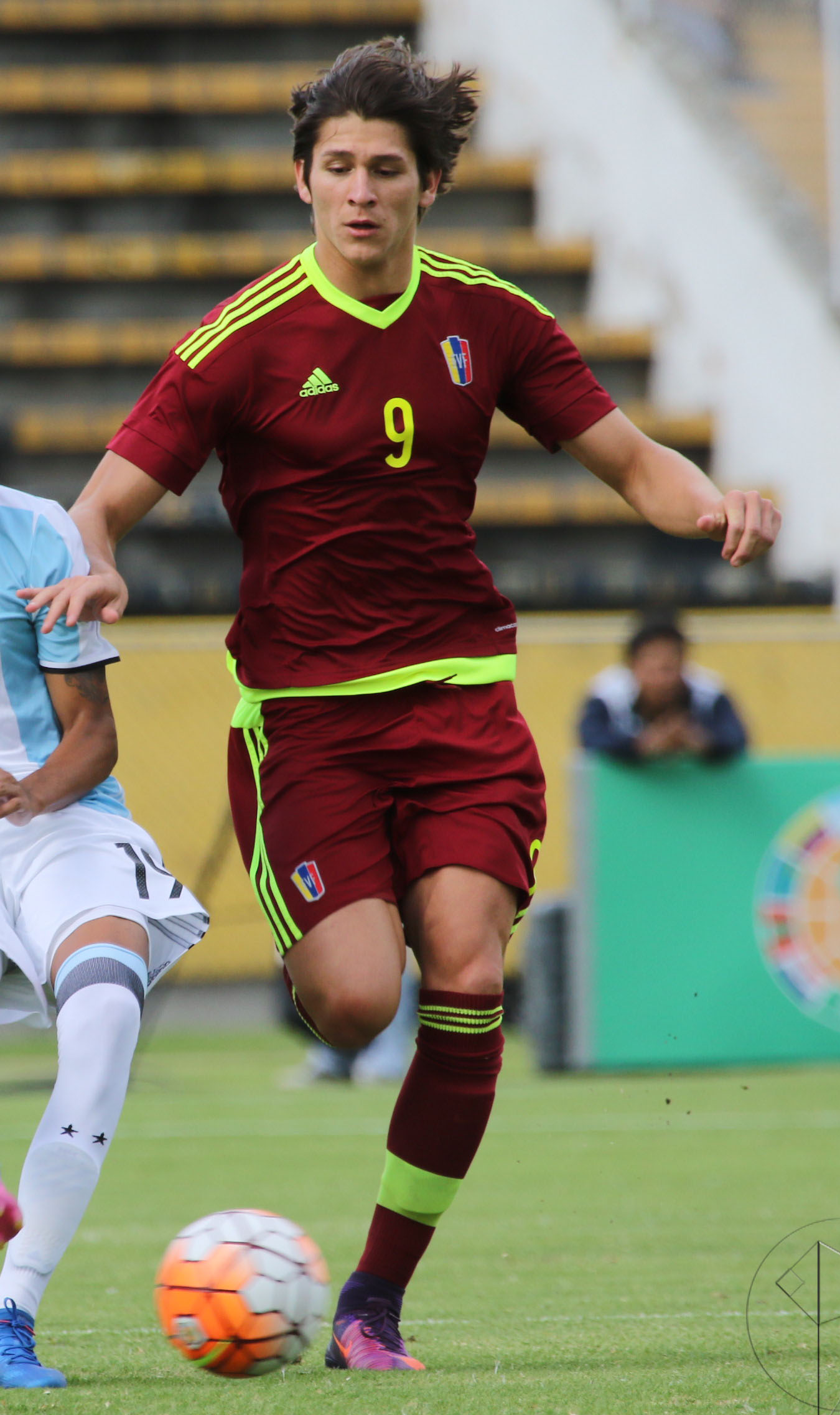

Personal information
- Full name: Ronaldo Luis Peña Vargas
- Date of birth: 10 March 1997 (age 29)
- Place of birth: Acarigua, Venezuela
- Height: 1.85 m (6 ft 1 in)
- Position: Striker

Team information
- Current team: Deportivo Lara

Youth career
- 2010–2019: Caracas

Senior career*
Years	Team	Apps	(Gls)
2013–2014	Caracas B	12	(7)
2014–2018	Caracas	4	(1)
2014–2015	→ Portuguesa (loan)	8	(1)
2015–2016	→ Las Palmas C (loan)	1	(3)
2016–2017	→ Las Palmas B (loan)	16	(7)
2017–2018	→ Moreirense (loan)	25	(3)
2018–2020	Houston Dynamo	14	(1)
2019	→ Rio Grande Valley FC (loan)	3	(0)
2021–2023	Universidad Central	33	(5)
2022	→ Chacarita Juniors (loan)	5	(0)
2024-2025	Portuguesa	18	(2)
2026-	Deportivo Lara	1	(1)

International career^{‡}
2012–2013	Venezuela U17	21	(10)
2014–2017	Venezuela U20	9	(0)
- * Club domestic league appearances and goals as of 18:45, 3 May 2021 (UTC). ‡ National team caps and goals as of 14 November 2020

Ronaldo Luis Peña Vargas (born 10 March 1997) is a Venezuelan footballer who plays as a forward for Deportivo Lara.

== Club career ==
=== Caracas ===
Peña made his debut as a senior with Caracas FC's B-team after coming through the club's youth academy. He first appeared with the main squad on 23 February 2014 by starting and scoring in a 4–1 home win Deportivo La Guaira in a Primera División match. He appeared in a further three matches for the first team before being loaned to Portuguesa FC on 25 August.

On 22 July 2015, Peña was loaned to UD Las Palmas for two years. After spending nearly nine months without playing a single match for the club due to bureaucratic problems, he made his debut with the C-team on 10 April 2016 by scoring a hat-trick in a 4–0 home routing of CD Becerril.

Promoted to the reserves ahead of the 2016–17 season, Peña scored another hat-trick in his first game for the side, a 5–0 thrashing of CD Buzanada.

Ahead of the 2017–18 season, Peña was loaned to Portuguese Primeira Liga side Moreirense. He made his debut for Moreirense on August 6, scoring in the 83rd minute to give Os verdes e brancos a 1–1 draw with Vitória Setúbal. He had 3 goals and 2 assists from 30 games across all competitions, helping Moreirense finish 15th in the league and avoid relegation by 2 points.

=== Houston Dynamo ===
On 5 July 2018, Peña was sold to MLS club Houston Dynamo. He made his debut on 4 August when he came on in a 1–0 loss to Sporting Kansas City. He would get his first goal with the Dynamo on 23 August, when he came on as a sub and scored a late equalizer in a 1–1 draw against the Dynamo's biggest rival, FC Dallas. Peña was rewarded with his first start in the team's next match. However he failed to find the net as the team lost 1–0 to the New York Red Bulls. He ended his first season in Houston with 1 goal from 9 appearances. It was a disappointing season for the Dynamo in league play, failing to qualify for the playoffs. They enjoyed a successful cup run, winning the U.S. Open Cup, but Peña did not appear in the tournament.

Peña made his first appearance of the 2019 season on 26 February in a 2–1 win over C.D. Guastatoya in a CONCACAF Champions League match. He missed the start of the MLS season due to a red card in the final game of 2018. He then missed extended time due to a knee injury at the start of the season. Peña scored his first goal and picked up his first assist of the season on 11 June in a 3–2 win over Austin Bold in a US Open Cup match. Peña would score again on 18 June in a 3–2 defeat to Minnesota United in the US Open Cup. He ended the season with 4 appearances and no goals or assists in MLS play, but did score 2 goals from 2 appearances in the Open Cup. Peña also spent time on loan with Houston's USL Championship affiliate Rio Grande Valley FC, making 3 appearances.

In 2020, Peña made 1 appearance all season, coming off the bench in a 1–1 draw against the LA Galaxy on July 23.

His contract option was declined by Houston following their 2020 season.

=== Universidad Central ===
In April 2021, Peña signed with Venezuelan Primera División side Universidad Central de Venezuela FC. He made his debut for UCV FC on 25 April, coming off the bench in a 2–0 loss to Monagas. In June 2022, Peña joined Argentine Primera Nacional club Chacarita Juniors on loan for 18 months, with a purchase option.

== International career ==
On 2 October 2018, Peña was called up for the Venezuela National team for friendlies against the United Arab Emirates and Basque Country but did not feature in either game.

== Career statistics ==
=== Club ===
As of 3 May 2021

Club	Season	League			National Cup		League Cup		Continental		Total	
Club	Season	Division	Apps	Goals	Apps	Goals	Apps	Goals	Apps	Goals	Apps	Goals
Caracas	2013–14	Primera División	4	1	0	0	—		0	0	4	1
Portuguesa (loan)	2014–15	Primera División	8	0	0	0	—		—		8	0
Las Palmas C (loan)	2015–16	Regional Preferente	1	3	—		—		—		1	3
Las Palmas B (loan)	2016–17	Tercera División	16	7	—		—		—		16	7
Moreirense (loan)	2017–18	Primeira Liga	25	3	3	0	2	0	—		30	3
Houston Dynamo	2018	MLS	9	1	0	0	—		—		9	1
Houston Dynamo	2019	MLS	4	0	2	2	—		2 (Note: Appearances in CONCACAF Champions League)	0	8	2
Houston Dynamo	2020	MLS	1	0	0	0	—		—		1	0
Houston Dynamo	Total		14	1	2	2	0	0	2	0	18	3
Rio Grande Valley FC (loan)	2019	USLC	3	0	—		—		—		3	0
Universidad Central	2021	Primera División	2	0	0	0	—		—		2	0
Career totals			73	15	5	2	2	0	2	0	82	17

== Honours ==
=== Club ===
Houston Dynamo

- US Open Cup: 2018

=== International ===
Venezuela U-20

- FIFA U-20 World Cup: Runner-up 2017
- South American Youth Football Championship: Third Place 2017

Venezuela U-17

- South American Under-17 Football Championship: Runner-Up 2013

== Personal life ==
His father played for professionally for Venezuelan club Portuguesa. Peña is named after legendary Brazilian footballer Ronaldo Luís Nazário de Lima.
