= Michael Nelson (soccer, born 1995) =

American soccer player

Personal information
- Date of birth: February 10, 1995 (age 31)
- Place of birth: Katy, Texas, United States
- Height: 1.93 m (6 ft 4 in)
- Position: Goalkeeper

Youth career
- Albion Hurricanes

College career
Years	Team	Apps	(Gls)
2013–2017	SMU Mustangs	76	(0)

Senior career*
Years	Team	Apps	(Gls)
2016	Oklahoma City Energy U23	6	(0)
2018–2022	Houston Dynamo	13	(0)
2018–2019	→ Rio Grande Valley FC (loan)	15	(0)
2022	Houston Dynamo 2	4	(0)
2023	FC Tulsa	32	(0)
- * Club domestic league appearances and goals as of October 20, 2023

Michael Nelson (born February 10, 1995) is an American professional soccer player who plays as a goalkeeper.

== Career ==
=== College & Youth ===
Nelson attended and played soccer at Seven Lakes High School in Katy, Texas. He helped them win a district championship and was named first team all-state. He also helped his youth club, Albion Hurricanes FC, win 2 state championships. Nelson played college soccer at Southern Methodist University between 2014 and 2017, including spending a year as a redshirt in 2013. While with the Mustangs, Nelson made 76 appearances and contributed 27 shutouts. He was named American Athletic Conference Goalkeeper of the Year in 2014, 2015, and 2017 and was first team all-conference in 2014, 2015, and 2017

During his time in college, Nelson also spent time with Premier Development League side OKC Energy U23 during their 2016 season.

=== Professional ===
Nelson was drafted in the first round, 20th overall, in the 2018 MLS SuperDraft by the Houston Dynamo on January 19, 2018. Nelson signed with Houston on February 20, 2018. He spent the 2018 season on loan with the Dynamo USL affiliate Rio Grande Valley FC. On June 23, 2018, he made his Toros debut and kept a clean sheet against Phoenix Rising. On the season, Nelson made 7 appearances and kept 3 clean sheets.

Nelson spent most of 2019 with the Toros again, making 8 appearances and keeping 1 clean sheet. However, he did make his Dynamo debut on June 18 in a 3–2 defeat to Minnesota United in the US Open Cup.

In 2020, Nelson stayed with the first team for the whole season, but he failed to appear in any games. He did make the match day squad on 3 occasions.

On August 28, 2021, with starting goalkeeper Marko Marić out with a leg injury, Nelson made his MLS debut in a 2–1 loss to Minnesota United. The game was the first of 10 consecutive starts for Nelson. He was named to the MLS Team of the Week for his performance on September 15 in a 1–1 draw with the LA Galaxy. After Marić returned from injury, Nelson started one of the final 3 games of the season. Nelson ended the season with 11 appearances and 2 clean sheets. It was a disappointing season for the Dynamo, as Houston missed out on the playoffs for the fourth consecutive season after they finished bottom of the Western Conference for the second straight year.

Nelson made 5 first team appearances during the 2022 season, 2 in the league and 3 in the Open Cup. He also made 5 appearances for Houston Dynamo 2.

On February 16, 2023, Nelson was waived by the Dynamo. He subsequently signed with USL Championship side FC Tulsa on March 3, 2023.

== Honors ==
Houston Dynamo

- US Open Cup: 2018

== Career statistics ==
As of February 16, 2023

Club	Season	League			US Open Cup		Playoffs		Continental		Total	
Club	Season	Division	Apps	Goals	Apps	Goals	Apps	Goals	Apps	Goals	Apps	Goals
Oklahoma City Energy U23	2016	PDL	6	0	—		0	0	—		6	0
Houston Dynamo	2018	Major League Soccer	0	0	0	0	—		—		0	0
Houston Dynamo	2019	Major League Soccer	0	0	1	0	—		0	0	1	0
Houston Dynamo	2020	Major League Soccer	0	0	—		—		—		0	0
Houston Dynamo	2021	Major League Soccer	11	0	—		—		—		11	0
Houston Dynamo	2022	Major League Soccer	2	0	3	0	—		—		5	0
Houston Dynamo	Dynamo Total		13	0	4	0	0	0	0	0	17	0
Rio Grande Valley FC (loan)	2018	United Soccer League	7	0	—		—		—		7	0
Rio Grande Valley FC (loan)	2019	USL Championship	8	0	—		—		—		8	0
Rio Grande Valley FC (loan)	RGVFC Total		15	0	0	0	0	0	0	0	15	0
Houston Dynamo 2	2022	MLS Next Pro	4	0	—		1	0	—		5	0
Career Total			38	0	4	0	1	0	0	0	43	0
