= Adam Lundkvist =

Swedish footballer (born 1994)

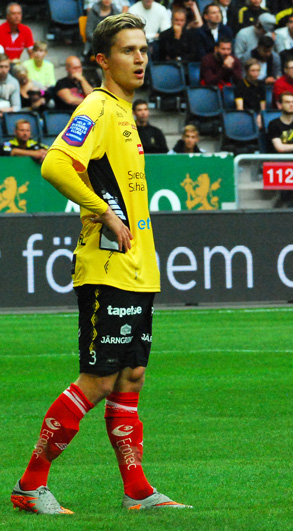

Personal information
- Full name: Adam Stefan Lundkvist
- Date of birth: 20 March 1994 (age 32)
- Place of birth: Sweden
- Height: 1.75 m (5 ft 9 in)
- Positions: Defender; midfielder

Team information
- Current team: BK Häcken
- Number: 21

Youth career
- –2010: Nyköpings BIS
- 2011–2013: IF Elfsborg

Senior career*
Years	Team	Apps	(Gls)
2010	Nyköpings BIS	7	(0)
2011–2018	IF Elfsborg	110	(3)
2018–2022	Houston Dynamo	121	(0)
2018	→ Rio Grande Valley FC (loan)	1	(0)
2023	Austin FC	23	(0)
2024–	BK Häcken	62	(0)

International career^{‡}
2011	Sweden U17	3	(0)
2012–2013	Sweden U19	15	(1)
2014–2017	Sweden U21/O	17	(0)
2016	Sweden	2	(0)
- * Club domestic league appearances and goals as of 8 July 2026 ‡ National team caps and goals as of 19 June 2017

Adam Lundkvist (born 20 March 1994) is a Swedish footballer who plays as a left-back for BK Häcken.

He previously played for IF Elfsborg in the Allsvenskan, where they won the Svenska Cupen, and in the MLS for Houston Dynamo, helping the club win the U.S. Open Cup. He has twice been capped by the Sweden national team and represented Sweden at the 2016 Summer Olympics.

== Club career ==
=== Nyköpings BIS ===
Lundkvist began his career with local club Nyköpings BIS. After joining the youth ranks in 2006, Lundkvist joined the first team in 2010. He made one appearance in the preliminary round of the Svenska Cupen before making his professional debut on 27 March 2010, coming on as a sub in Nyköpings BIS's 5–2 defeat to BK Forward in round 1 of the Svenska Cupen. Lundkvist made his league debut on 16 May 2010 when he came on as a sub against Örebro SK Ungdomsklubb

=== IF Elfsborg ===
In 2011, Lundkvist joined Allsvenskan club IF Elfsborg. He would spend time with the Elfsborg youth teams before making his first team debut on 25 September 2013, coming on as a sub in a league match with IF Brommapojkarna. On 7 November 2013, Lundkvist made his Europa League debut, getting the start against Danish side Esbjerg. Lundkvist helped Elfsborg when their 3rd ever Svenska Cupen by featuring 6 times during the 2013-14 version of the competition, however he didn't appear in the final. 2014 also saw Lundkvist convert from a midfielder to a left back. He scored his first goal for Elfsborg in a 2-0 Allsvenskan win over Kalmar FF on 17 August 2014.

=== Houston Dynamo ===
On 26 April 2018, Major League Soccer club Houston Dynamo signed Lundkvist on a full transfer using targeted allocation money. He played one game on loan with the Dynamo's USL affiliate club Rio Grande Valley FC to regain match fitness. He made his Dynamo debut on 30 May against Real Salt Lake. In his debut as well as in many games in his first year with the Dynamo, Lundkvist played right back instead of his natural left back position due to starter AJ DeLaGarza being injured and veteran DaMarcus Beasley occupying the starting left back spot. He helped the Dynamo win the 2018 US Open Cup, their first ever, by making 2 appearances and picking up 2 assists in the competition, including a game winning assist on 18 June against Minnesota United. It was a poor season in the league however, with Houston finishing 9th in the Western Conference and missing out on the playoffs, with Lundkvist making 16 appearances and recording 1 assist.

On 2 March 2019, with DaMarcus Beasley resting for their CONCACAF Champions League match, Lundkvist got the start for the Dynamo's first league game of the 2019 season. Head coach Wilmer Cabrera's decision paid off in the 60th minute when Lundkvist sent in a cross that Mauro Manotas hit past goalkeeper Nick Rimando to give Houston a 1–1 draw with Real Salt Lake. Lundkvist would get the start in the Dynamo's next MLS match, a 2–1 win over the Montreal Impact, while Beasley again was rested for the CCL matches. On 12 March, Lundkvist was subbed on in the 19th minute of Houston's 2nd leg Champions League fixture with Tigres UANL when Beasley suffered an injury. Beasley was ruled out for 4–6 weeks, allowing Lundkvist to become the starting left back for the first significant stretch since he arrived in Houston. Once Beasley had recovered from his injury, Lundkvist still featured prominently at left back and filled in at right back at the end of the season after DeLaGarza was injured. He ended the season with 28 appearances and 4 assists in MLS play, but Houston struggled as a team, missing out on the playoffs again.

2020 saw Lundkvist become the first choice left back for new head coach Tab Ramos following Beasley's retirement after the 2019 season. In a shortened season due to the COVID-19 pandemic, Lundkvist started 21 of Houston's 23 games, with the only 2 he missed being the result of a suspension for a violent tackle. The season was poor for the Dynamo as a whole, finishing last in the Western Conference and missing out on the playoffs for the 3rd straight season.

On 25 March 2021, Lundkvist signed a contract extension through the 2022 season, with team options for 2023 and 2024. After starting the first 8 matches of the season, Lundkvist only started 4 of the next 11 games, with one of those starts being as a winger rather than as a fullback, as Lundkvist competed with Sam Junqua for the starting left back spot. Lundkvist reclaimed his starting spot by matchday 20, starting the next 7 games before suffering a knee injury on 18 September during a 3–2 win over Texas Derby rivals FC Dallas. After missing a month, he returned to action on 20 October, coming on as a halftime substitute in a 3–0 loss to the LA Galaxy before playing the full 90 minutes for Houston's final 3 matches. Lundkvist ended the season with 25 appearances and 2 assists as the Dynamo finished last in the Conference for the second straight season and missed the playoffs for the 4th straight year.

The 2022 season saw Lundkvist record 5 assists in 31 appearances, 30 of them starts. He tied with Darwin Quintero for the team lead in assists in MLS play. Despite a strong season from Lundkvist, Houston missed the playoffs for the 5th consecutive season, finishing 13th in the West.

=== Austin FC ===
On 10 January 2023, Lundkvist was traded to Copa Tejas rivals Austin FC in exchange for $500,000 in General Allocation Money. In 2023, Lundkvist had 23 appearances, starting in eight games and tallying 2 assists. His appearances were limited later in the season as he dealt with injuries sustained on the field. Austin ended the 2023 season missing the playoffs, finishing 12th in the Western Conference. On 17 November 2023, Austin FC announced they would not exercise the 2024 option for Lundkvist.

=== BK Häcken ===
On 28 December 2023 Lundkvist signed with BK Häcken as a free agent.

== International career ==
Lundkvist has represented Sweden at various youth levels as well as at the 2016 Summer Olympics, where he started all 3 of the group stage matches. He made his senior team debut on 6 January in a friendly against Estonia.

== Personal life ==
Lundkvist played ice hockey as a kid. He has said that former Sweden international Klas Ingesson, who was his coach at Elfsborg, was his favorite player and served as a father figure when Lundkvist moved to Elfsborg. Lundkvist and his father are fans of English Premier League club Liverpool.

== Career statistics ==
As of 21 October 2023

Club Performance			League		Cup		Continental		Other		Total	
Club	Season	League	Apps	Goals	Apps	Goals	Apps	Goals	Apps	Goals	Apps	Goals
Sweden			League		Svenska Cupen		UEFA		Svenska Supercupen		Total	
Nyköpings BIS	2010	Div 2 Södra Svealand	7	0	1	0	—		—		8	0
If Elfsborg	2013	Allsvenskan	2	0	1	0	2 (Note: Appearances in UEFA Europa League)	0	—		5	0
If Elfsborg	2014	Allsvenskan	20	1	7	0	6	0	1	0	34	1
If Elfsborg	2015	Allsvenskan	29	1	6	0	6	0	—		41	1
If Elfsborg	2016	Allsvenskan	25	1	4	0	—		—		29	1
If Elfsborg	2017	Allsvenskan	29	0	3	0	—		—		32	0
If Elfsborg	2018	Allsvenskan	5	0	2	0	—		—		7	0
If Elfsborg	If Elfsborg Total		110	3	24	0	14	0	1	0	148	3
United States			League		US Open Cup		CONCACAF		Other (Note: Includes appearance(s) in Leagues Cup)		Total	
Houston Dynamo	2018	Major League Soccer	16	0	2	0	—		—		18	0
Houston Dynamo	2019	Major League Soccer	28	0	0	0	1 (Note: Appearances in CONCACAF Champions League)	0	—		29	0
Houston Dynamo	2020	Major League Soccer	21	0	—		—		—		21	0
Houston Dynamo	2021	Major League Soccer	25	0	—		—		—		25	0
Houston Dynamo	2022	Major League Soccer	31	0	0	0	—		—		31	0
Houston Dynamo	Dynamo Total		121	0	2	0	1	0	0	0	124	0
Rio Grande Valley FC (loan)	2018	United Soccer League	1	0	—		—		—		1	0
Austin FC	2023	Major League Soccer	23	0	2	0	2	1	1	0	28	1
Career Totals			264	3	28	0	17	1	2	0	309	4

== Honors ==
IF Elfsborg

- Svenska Cupen: 2013–14

Houston Dynamo

- US Open Cup: 2018

BK Häcken

- Svenska Cupen: 2024–25
