= 2020 Houston Dynamo season =

Houston Dynamo
2020 season
- Owner: Gabriel Brener
- General manager: Matt Jordan
- Head coach: Tab Ramos
- Stadium: BBVA Stadium
- MLS: Conference: 12th Overall: 25th
- MLS Cup Playoffs: Did not qualify
- U.S. Open Cup: Cancelled
- CONCACAF Champions League: Did not qualify
- Leagues Cup: Did not qualify
- MLS is Back Tournament: Group stage
- Top goalscorer: League: Darwin Quintero (7 goals); All: Darwin Quintero (7 goals)
- Average home league attendance: 6,859 (Overall); 22,038 (Pre-Covid); 1,799 (Post-Covid)
- Biggest win: SKC 2–5 HOU (Aug. 25); HOU 3–0 MIN (Sept. 2)
- Biggest defeat: SKC 0–4 HOU (March 7); CHI 0–4 HOU (Sept. 22)
Home colors	Away colors

The 2020 Houston Dynamo season was the club's 15th season of existence since joining Major League Soccer prior to the 2006 season. The Dynamo missed the playoffs in 2020 for the 6th time in 7 years, finishing last in the Western Conference. The 2020 U.S. Open Cup was canceled due to the COVID-19 pandemic.

2020 was the Dynamo's first year with head coach Tab Ramos and the sixth season under General Manager Matt Jordan. On the front office end, it was Gabriel Brener's fifth season as majority owner and John Walker's second season as President of Business Operations.

== Current squad ==
As of November 8, 2020

Appearances and goals are totals for MLS regular season only.

No.	Name	Nationality	Position	Date of birth (Age)	Signed from	Signed in	Apps.	Goals
Goalkeepers
1	Marko Marić	(Croatia)	GK	January 3, 1996 (age 24)	TSG 1899 Hoffenheim	2020	23	0
26	Michael Nelson	(United States)	GK	February 10, 1995 (age 25)	Southern Methodist University	2018	0	0
55	Cody Cropper	(United States)	GK	February 16, 1993 (age 27)	New England Revolution	2020	0	0
Defenders
2	Alejandro Fuenmayor	(Venezuela)	DF	August 29, 1996 (age 24)	Carabobo FC	2018	35	3
3	Adam Lundkvist	(Sweden)	DF	March 20, 1994 (age 26)	IF Elfsborg	2018	65	0
4	Zarek Valenin	(United States)	DF	August 6, 1991 (age 29)	Nashville SC	2020	19	0
5	Aljaž Struna	(Slovenia)	DF	August 4, 1990 (age 30)	Palermo	2018	46	0
15	Maynor Figueroa	(Honduras)	DF	May 2, 1983 (age 37)	FC Dallas	2019	45	2
18	José Bizama	(Chile)	DF	June 25, 1994 (age 26)	Club Deportivo Huachipato	2019	13	0
28	Erik McCue (HGP)	(Sweden)	DF	January 18, 2001 (age 19)	Houston Dynamo Academy	2018	0	0
29	Sam Junqua	(United States)	DF	November 9, 1996 (age 23)	University of California	2019	9	1
32	Kyle Adams	(New Zealand)	DF	November 20, 1996 (age 23)	Rio Grande Valley FC	2020	0	0
36	Victor Cabrera	(Argentina)	DF	February 7, 1993 (age 27)	Montreal Impact	2020	10	0
Midfielders
6	Wilfried Zahibo	(Central African Republic)	MF	August 21, 1993 (age 27)	New England Revolution	2020	4	0
8	Memo Rodríguez (HGP)	(United States)	MF	December 27, 1995 (age 24)	Rio Grande Valley FC	2017	75	15
10	Tomás Martínez (DP)	(Argentina)	MF	March 7, 1995 (age 25)	Braga	2017	85	12
12	Niko Hansen	(Denmark)	MF	September 14, 1994 (age 26)	Columbus Crew	2019	21	2
14	Marcelo Palomino (HGP)	(United States)	MF	May 21, 2001 (age 19)	Houston Dynamo Academy	2020	3	0
17	Nico Lemoine	(United States)	MF	April 10, 2000 (age 20)	Rio Grande Valley FC	2020	11	0
22	Matías Vera	(Argentina)	MF	October 26, 1995 (age 25)	San Lorenzo	2019	50	0
24	Darwin Cerén	(El Salvador)	MF	December 31, 1989 (age 30)	San Jose Earthquakes	2018	57	3
27	Boniek García	(Honduras)	MF	September 4, 1984 (age 36)	Olimpia	2012	219	13
Forwards
9	Mauro Manotas (DP)	(Colombia)	FW	July 15, 1995 (age 25)	Uniautónoma	2015	149	51
11	Ariel Lassiter	(Costa Rica)	FW	September 27, 1994 (age 26)	Alajuelense	2020	16	3
13	Christian Ramirez	(United States)	FW	April 4, 1991 (age 29)	LAFC	2019	25	7
19	Michael Salazar	(Belize)	FW	November 15, 1992 (age 27)	Rio Grande Valley FC	2019	8	0
21	Ronaldo Peña	(Venezuela)	FW	March 10, 1997 (age 23)	Caracas FC	2018	14	1
23	Darwin Quintero	(Colombia)	FW	September 19, 1987 (age 33)	Minnesota United FC	2020	22	7
	Mateo Bajamich	(Argentina)	FW	August 3, 1999 (age 21)	Instituto	2020	0	0

== Player movement ==
=== In ===
Per Major League Soccer and club policies terms of the deals do not get disclosed.

Date	Player	Position	Age	Previous club	Notes	Ref
November 13, 2019	(Colombia) Darwin Quintero	FW	32	(United States) Minnesota United FC	Acquired in exchange for $600,000 in allocation money and Marlon Hairtson.	
November 19, 2019	(United States) Zarek Valentin	DF	28	(United States) Nashville SC	Acquired in exchange for Joe Willis. Valentin had been selected by Nashville in the 2019 MLS Expansion Draft earlier that day.	
November 20, 2019	(Argentina) Victor Cabrera	DF	26	(Canada) Montreal Impact	Acquired in exchange for Romell Quioto.	
January 6, 2020	(United States) Marcelo Palomino	MF	18	(United States) Houston Dynamo Academy	Homegrown Player	
January 13, 2020	(Croatia) Marko Marić	GK	24	(Germany) TSG 1899 Hoffenheim	Full rights purchased, fee undisclosed	
January 24, 2020	(United States) Cody Cropper	GK	26	(United States) New England Revolution	Free transfer	
January 25, 2020	(New Zealand) Kyle Adams	DF	23	(United States) Rio Grande Valley FC	Free transfer from USLC affiliate	
June 11, 2020	(United States) Nico Lemoine	MF	20	(United States) Rio Grande Valley FC	Free transfer from USLC affiliate.	
August 17, 2020	(Central African Republic) Wilfried Zahibo	MF	26	(United States) New England Revolution	Acquired along with an international roster spot for 2020 in exchange for Tommy McNamara and $175,000 in GAM.	
October 5, 2020	(Argentina) Mateo Bajamich	FW	21	(Argentina) Instituto	Full rights purchased for $1.2 million, Instituto have 20% sell on clause.	

=== Out ===
Date	Player	Position	Age	Destination Club	Notes	Ref
October 9, 2019	(United States) DaMarcus Beasley	DF	37	Retired		
November 13, 2019	(United States) Marlon Hairston	MF	25	(United States) Minnesota United FC	Traded for Darwin Quintero and a 2020 SuperDraft 3rd round pick	
November 19, 2019	(United States) Joe Willis	GK	31	(United States) Nashville SC	Traded for Zarek Valentin and $75,000 of TAM.	
November 20, 2019	(Honduras) Romell Quioto	FW	28	(Canada) Montreal Impact	Traded for Victor Cabrera and $100,000 of GAM.	
November 21, 2019	(United States) Eric Bird	MF	26	(United States) FC Tulsa	Contract option declined.	
November 21, 2019	(Colombia) Juan David Cabezas	MF	28	(United States) Rio Grande Valley FC	Contract option declined	
November 21, 2019	(United States) Tyler Deric	GK	31	(United States) Rio Grande Valley FC	Contract option declined	
November 21, 2019	(Guam) A. J. DeLaGarza	DF	32	(United States) Inter Miami CF	Contract expired	
November 21, 2019	(United States) Kevin Garcia	DF	29	(United States) FC Tulsa	Contract expired	
August 17, 2020	(United States) Tommy McNamara	MF	29	(United States) New England Revolution	Traded along with $175,000 of GAM for Wilfried Zahibo and an international roster spot for 2020.	
September 19, 2020	(Honduras) Alberth Elis	FW	24	(Portugal) Boavista	Transfer fee undisclosed, but is rumored to be around $1 million.	

=== Loans in ===
Date	Player	Position	Age	Previous club	Notes	Ref
August 17, 2020	(Costa Rica) Ariel Lassiter	FW	25	(Costa Rica) Alajuelense	Signed on loan for the 2020 season with an option to buy.	

=== Loans out ===
Date	Player	Position	Age	Destination Club	Notes	Ref
August 15, 2020	(New Zealand) Kyle Adams	DF	23	(United States) Rio Grande Valley FC	Loaned to USLC affiliate for remainder of 2020 season.	
August 15, 2020	(Sweden) Eric McCue	DF	19	(United States) Rio Grande Valley FC	Loaned to USLC affiliate for remainder of 2020 season.	

=== MLS SuperDraft ===
Round	Pick	Player	Position	Age	College	Notes	Ref
1	8	(United States) Garrett McLaughlin	FW	22	Southern Methodist	Signed with Rio Grande Valley FC	
2	34	(United States) Luka Prpa	MF	21	Marquette	Signed with Rio Grande Valley FC	
3	60	(United States) Duncan Turnbull	GK	21	Notre Dame	Signed with Portsmouth FC.	
4	86	(Saint Vincent and the Grenadines) Kyle Edwards	FW	22	Texas Rio Grande Valley	Signed with Rio Grande Valley FC	

== Coaching staff ==
Since November 9, 2020

Position	Name
Head coach	(United States) Tab Ramos
Assistant coach	(United States) Pablo Mastroeni
Assistant coach	(United States) Omid Namazi
Coach	(United States) Michael Dellorusso
Goalkeeper coach	(England) Paul Rogers
Sports Performance Director/Fitness Coach	(Republic of Ireland) Paul Caffrey
Head of sports science	(Australia) Alex Calder
Equipment Manager	(United States) Chris Maxwell
Assistant Equipment Manager	(Mexico) Eddie Cerda
Chief Medical Officer	(United States) Dr. Rehal Bhojani
Head Athletic Trainer	(United States) Chris Rumsey
Assistant Athletic Trainer	(United States) Casey Carlson
Head Physical Therapist	(United States) Nathan Hironymous
Massage Therapist	(United States) Ivan Diaz

== Non-competitive ==
=== Preseason friendlies ===
January 25, 2020	Houston Dynamo	2–0	Houston Baptist Huskies	Houston, Texas
CST	Martinez 25'; Rios 60'	Report		Stadium: Houston Sports Park
Note: Played with two 30-minute halves.

February 5, 2020	UTRGV Vaqueros	0–3	Houston Dynamo	Edinburg, Texas
CST		Report; Report	Hansen 14'; Quintero 17'; Cabrera 2nd half'	Stadium: H-E-B Park

February 8, 2020	Rio Grande Valley FC Toros	0–5	Houston Dynamo	Edinburg, Texas
CST		Report	Martínez 23' (Lundqvist); Manotas 37' (Figueroa); Salazar 93', 111'; McNamara 118' (pen.)	Stadium: H-E-B Park
Note: Played in four 30-minute periods.

February 15, 2020 Visit Tucson Sun Cup	Houston Dynamo	1–1	New York Red Bulls	Tucson, Arizona
5:30 PM CST	Rodríguez 58'	Report	Kaku 12'	Stadium: Kino North Stadium

February 19, 2020 Visit Tucson Sun Cup	Houston Dynamo	4–0	Real Salt Lake	Tucson, Arizona
3:00 PM CST	Manotas 52'; McNamara 60'; Hansen 63'; Ramirez 81'	Report		Stadium: Kino North Stadium

February 22, 2020 Visit Tucson Sun Cup	Houston Dynamo	0–4	Columbus Crew	Tucson, Arizona
4:00 PM CST		Report	Zardez 1', 23'; Mensah 4'; Zelarayán 16'	Stadium: Kino North Stadium

=== Midseason friendlies ===
March 27, 2020	Houston Dynamo	v	Cruz Azul	Houston, Texas
8:00 PM CST				Stadium: BBVA Stadium
Note: Match postponed due to the COVID-19 pandemic

== Competitive ==
=== MLS ===
==== Western Conference table ====
Pos	Team	Pld	W	L	T	GF	GA	GD	Pts	PPG	Qualification
8	San Jose Earthquakes	23	8	9	6	35	51	−16	30	1.30	MLS Cup First Round
9	Vancouver Whitecaps FC	23	9	14	0	27	44	−17	27	1.17	
10	LA Galaxy	22	6	12	4	27	46	−19	22	1.00	
11	Real Salt Lake	22	5	10	7	25	35	−10	22	1.00	
12	Houston Dynamo	23	4	10	9	30	40	−10	21	0.91	

Source: MLS
Rules for classification: 1) points per game; 2) total wins per match played; 3) total goal differential per match played; 4) total goals scored per match played; 5) fewest disciplinary points per match played; 6) away goal differential per away match played; 7) away goals scored per away match played; 8) home goal differential per home match played; 9) home goals scored per home match played; 10) coin toss or drawing of lots.

==== Overall table ====
2020 MLS overall standings
Pos	Team	Pld	W	L	T	GF	GA	GD	Pts	PPG	Qualification
22	Chicago Fire FC	23	5	10	8	33	39	−6	23	1.00	
23	Atlanta United FC	23	6	13	4	23	30	−7	22	0.96	CONCACAF Champions League
24	D.C. United	23	5	12	6	25	41	−16	21	0.91	
25	Houston Dynamo	23	4	10	9	30	40	−10	21	0.91	
26	FC Cincinnati	23	4	15	4	12	36	−24	16	0.70	

Source: MLS
Rules for classification: 1) points per game; 2) total wins per match played; 3) total goal differential per match played; 4) total goals scored per match played; 5) fewest disciplinary points per match played; 6) away goal differential per away match played; 7) away goals scored per away match played; 8) home goal differential per home match played; 9) home goals scored per home match played; 10) coin toss or drawing of lots.

==== MLS is Back Tournament ====
The MLS is Back Tournament was a one-off tournament during the 2020 Major League Soccer season to mark the league's return to action from the COVID-19 pandemic. The tournament featured a group stage, followed by a knockout stage. Games during the group stage counted as regular season matches. The schedule was revealed on June 24.

===== Group E =====
Group F results
Pos	Team	Pld	W	D	L	GF	GA	GD	Pts	Qualification
1	Portland Timbers	3	2	1	0	6	4	+2	7	Advanced to knockout stage
2	Los Angeles FC	3	1	2	0	11	7	+4	5	Advanced to knockout stage
3	Houston Dynamo	3	0	2	1	5	6	−1	2	
4	LA Galaxy	3	0	1	2	4	9	−5	1	

Source: MLS

==== Results summary ====
Overall								Home						Away					
Pld	W	D	L	GF	GA	GD	Pts	W	D	L	GF	GA	GD	W	D	L	GF	GA	GD
23	4	9	10	30	40	−10	21	3	4	3	14	12	+2	1	5	7	16	28	−12

==== Match results ====
February 29, 2020 1	Houston Dynamo	1–1	LA Galaxy	Houston, Texas
2:30 PM CST	García (yellow card) 49'; Manotas 54'	Report	Pavón 13'; Katai (yellow card) 51'	Stadium: BBVA Compass Stadium; Attendance: 22,038; Referee: Jair Marrufo

March 7. 2020 2	Sporting Kansas City	4–0	Houston Dynamo	Kansas City, Kansas
7:30 PM CST	Pulido 16'; Espinoza 26'; Sánchez (yellow card) 30'; Kinda (yellow card) 56', (goal) 65'; Shelton 77'	Report	Struna (yellow card) 14'; Figueroa (yellow card) 25'; Vera (yellow card) 31'; Lundqvist (yellow card) 35'; Salazar (yellow card) 89'	Stadium: Children's Mercy Park; Attendance: 21,188; Referee: Allen Chapman

July 13, 2020 3 MLS is Back GS	Los Angeles FC	3–3	Houston Dynamo	Bay Lake, Florida
7:30 PM CDT	Wright-Phillips 19'; Blackmon (yellow card) 52'; Rossi 63'; Rodríguez 69'	Report	Rodríguez 9', 30'; Elis 45+5'; Vera (yellow card) 46'; García (yellow card) 67'	Stadium: ESPN Wide World of Sports Complex; Referee: Tim Ford

July 18, 2020 4 MLS is Back GS	Portland Timbers	2–1	Houston Dynamo	Bay Lake, Florida
7:00 PM CDT	Williamson (yellow card) 24'; Ebobisse 35'; Valeri 61'; Villafaña (yellow card) 86'	Report	Figueroa (yellow card) 7'; Rodríguez (yellow card) 45+1'; Elis 86' (pen.), (yellow card) 87' (yellow-red card) 88'	Stadium: ESPN Wide World of Sports Complex; Referee: Ismail Elfath

July 23, 2020 5 MLS is Back GS	LA Galaxy	1–1	Houston Dynamo	Bay Lake, Florida
7:00 PM CDT	Steres (yellow card) 84'; Pavón 90+1' (pen.)	Report	Quintero 17', (yellow card) 59'; Struna (yellow card) 45+3'; García (yellow card) 70'	Stadium: ESPN Wide World of Sports Complex; Referee: Victor Rivas

August 21, 2020 6	Houston Dynamo	0–0	FC Dallas	Houston, Texas
7:00 PM CDT	Rodríguez (yellow card) 45+1'; Figueroa (yellow card) 82'	Report	Ferreira (yellow card) 42'; Santos (yellow card) 85'	Stadium: BBVA Compass Stadium; Referee: Alex Chilowicz

August 25, 2020 7	Sporting Kansas City	2–5	Houston Dynamo	Kansas City, Kansas
7:30 PM CDT	Russell 26'; Busio (yellow card) 38'; Kinda 49'	Report	Elis 17'; Vera (yellow card) 25'; Ramirez 44'; Hansen 48'; Quintero 57', 61'	Stadium: Children's Mercy Park; Referee: Joseph Dickerson

September 2, 2020 8	Houston Dynamo	3–0	Minnesota United FC	Houston, Texas
7:00 PM CDT	Quintero 28'; Lassiter 65', 70'; Struna (yellow card) 78'; Zahibo (yellow card) 90'	Report	Boxall (yellow card) 84'	Stadium: BBVA Compass Stadium; Referee: Allen Chapman

September 5, 2020 9	Houston Dynamo	2–1	Sporting Kansas City	Houston, Texas
7:00 PM CDT	Elis 59'; Manotas 85'; Figueroa (yellow card) 90+1'	Report	Hurtado 30'	Stadium: BBVA Compass Stadium; Referee: Timothy Ford

September 9, 2020 10	Colorado Rapids	1–1	Houston Dynamo	Commerce City, Colorado
8:00 PM CDT	Abubakar (yellow card) 6', (goal) 90+6'; Lewis (yellow card) 20'; Rubio (yellow card) 90+2'	Report	Ramirez 46'	Stadium: Dick's Sporting Goods Park; Referee: Fotis Bazakos

September 12, 2020 11	FC Dallas	2–1	Houston Dynamo	Frisco, Texas
7:30 PM CDT	Ricaurte 28'; Santos (yellow card) 33'; Jara 61'; Barrios (yellow card) 90+4'	Report	Cerén (yellow card) 28'; Rodríguez 48' (yellow card) 87'; Lassiter (yellow card) 49'; García (yellow card) 89'; Quintero (yellow card) 90+5'	Stadium: Toyota Stadium; Referee: Joseph Dickerson

September 19, 2020 12	Houston Dynamo	2–2	Minnesota United FC	Houston, Texas
7:00 PM CDT	Vera (yellow card) 44'; Quintero 58'; Struna (yellow card) 67'; Figueroa 69'; Rodríguez (yellow card) 77'	Report	Molino 11'; Toye (yellow card) 40'; Lod 45+1'; Boxall (yellow card) 81'; Greguš (red card) 88'	Stadium: BBVA Compass Stadium; Attendance: 2,486; Referee: Victor Rivas

September 23, 2020 13	Chicago Fire	4–0	Houston Dynamo	Chicago, Illinois
6:30 PM CDT	Berić 15'; Herbers 23'; Medrán 40'; Pineda (yellow card) 63'; Shuttleworth (yellow card) 70'; Sapong 89' (pen.)	Report	Lassiter (yellow card) 83'; Struna (yellow card) 87'; Marić (yellow card) 89'	Stadium: Soldier Field; Referee: Marcos de Oliveira

September 26, 2020 14	Nashville SC	1–1	Houston Dynamo	Nashville, Tennessee
2:30 PM CDT	Ríos 49'	Report	Lundkvist (yellow card) 75'; Lemoine (yellow card) 81'; Figueroa 89'	Stadium: Nissan Stadium; Referee: Rubiel Vazquez

October 3, 2020 15	Houston Dynamo	1–2	Sporting Kansas City	Houston, Texas
7:00 PM CDT	Struna (yellow card) 45+1'; Vera (yellow card) 72'; Quintero (yellow card) 77'; Junqua 84'; Figueroa (yellow card) 90+5'	Report	Pulido 34', 73'; Dia (yellow card) 39'; Reid (yellow card) 77'; Sánchez (yellow card) 81'; Espinoza (yellow card) 90'; Melia (yellow card) 90+3'	Stadium: BBVA Compass Stadium; Referee: Kevin Stott

October 7, 2020 16	Houston Dynamo	2–0	FC Dallas	Houston, Texas
7:00PM CDT	Fuenmayor (yellow card) 8'; Cerén (yellow card) 16', (goal) 83' (pen.); Quintero 20'; Manotas (red card) 45+2'	Report	Ziegler (yellow card) 59'; Reynolds (yellow card) 81'; Bressan (yellow card) 90+1'; Barrios (yellow card) 90+8'	Stadium: BBVA Compass Stadium; Attendance: 1,582; Referee: Ismail Elfath

October 10, 2020 17	Inter Miami CF	1–0	Houston Dynamo	Fort Lauderdale, Florida
4:00PM CDT	Morgan 57' (pen.), (yellow card) 76'	Report	Quintero (yellow card) 37'	Stadium: Inter Miami CF Stadium; Referee: Drew Fischer

October 14, 2020 18	Houston Dynamo	1–3	Nashville SC	Houston, Texas
7:00 PM CDT	Figueroa (yellow card) 22'; Quintero 75'; Martínez (yellow card) 82'	Report	Mukhtar 15', 23'; Danladi 19'; Beckeles (yellow card) 86'	Stadium: BBVA Compass Stadium; Attendance: 1,328; Referee: Nima Saghafi

October 18, 2020 19	Minnesota United FC	2–2	Houston Dynamo	Saint Paul, Minnesota
7:00 PM CDT	Finlay 11', 30'; Hayes (yellow card) 90+4'	Report	Lundkvist (yellow card) 9'; Rodríguez 59'; Hansen 83'	Stadium: Allianz Field; Referee: Elton García

October 24, 2020 20	Houston Dynamo	1–1	Columbus Crew	Houston, Texas
7:00 PM CDT	Rodríguez (yellow card) 22', (goal) 37'; Vera (yellow card) 42'	Report	Afful (yellow card) 32'; Cabrera 67' (o.g.); Morris (yellow card) 84'; Díaz (yellow card) 90+1'	Stadium: BBVA Stadium; Referee: Joseph Dickerson

October 28, 2020 21	Los Angeles FC	2–1	Houston Dynamo	Los Angeles
7:30 PM PDT	Rossi 9'; Segura 22', (yellow card) 32'; Cifuentes (yellow card) 84'; Blessing (yellow card) 85'	Report	Lassiter 46'; Vera (yellow card) 33' (red card) 59'; Quintero (yellow card) 72'; Garcia (yellow card) 90'	Stadium: Banc of California Stadium; Referee: Ramy Touchan

October 31, 2020 22	FC Dallas	3–0	Houston Dynamo	Frisco, Texas
2:30 PM CDT (UTC-05)	Jara 19'; Picault 27', 90+3', (yellow card) 90+4'; Santos (yellow card) 69'	Report	Bizama (yellow card) 45+2'; Zahibo (yellow card) 55'	Stadium: Toyota Stadium; Attendance: 4,028; Referee: Jair Marrufo

November 8, 2020 23	Houston Dynamo	1–2	Colorado Rapids	Houston, Texas
5:30 PM CDT	Figueroa (yellow card) 42'; Cerén (yellow card) 56'; Cabrera (yellow card) 59'; Manotas 69'	Report	Namli 61'; Abubakar (yellow card) 90+1'; Rubio 90+3'	Stadium: BBVA Stadium; Attendance: 0 Referee: Alex Chilowicz

=== U.S. Open Cup ===
As an MLS club, the Dynamo was originally set to enter the competition in the Third or Fourth Round, tentatively scheduled for April 21–23 or May 19–20. The U.S. Soccer Federation canceled the tournament on August 17, 2020, due to the COVID-19 pandemic.

== Season statistics ==
No.	Pos	Nat	Player	Total					MLS				
No.	Pos	Nat	Player	Apps	Goals	Assists	Booked	Sent off (straight red)	Apps	Goals	Assists	Booked	Sent off (straight red)
1	GK	(Croatia)	Marko Marić	23	0	0	1	0	23	0	0	1	0
2	DF	(Venezuela)	Alejandro Fuenmayor	5	0	0	1	0	5	0	0	1	0
3	DF	(Sweden)	Adam Lundqvist	21	0	0	3	0	21	0	0	3	0
4	DF	(United States)	Zarek Valentin	19	0	3	0	0	19	0	3	0	0
5	DF	(Slovenia)	Aljaž Struna	17	0	0	6	0	17	0	0	6	0
6	MF	(Central African Republic)	Wilfried Zahibo	4	0	0	2	0	4	0	0	2	0
7	FW	(Honduras)	Alberth Elis (Note: Transferred out during the season)	6	4	3	1	1	6	4	3	1	1
8	MF	(United States)	Memo Rodríguez	21	5	3	5	0	21	5	3	5	0
9	FW	(Colombia)	Mauro Manotas	20	3	2	0	1	20	3	2	0	1
10	MF	(Argentina)	Tomás Martínez	11	0	0	1	0	11	0	0	1	0
11	MF	(United States)	Tommy McNamara	4	0	0	0	0	4	0	0	0	0
11	FW	(Costa Rica)	Ariel Lassiter	16	3	1	2	0	16	3	1	2	0
12	FW	(Denmark)	Niko Hansen	17	2	1	0	0	17	2	1	0	0
13	FW	(United States)	Christian Ramirez	15	2	2	0	0	15	2	2	0	0
14	MF	(United States)	Marcelo Palomino	3	0	0	0	0	3	0	0	0	0
15	DF	(Honduras)	Maynor Figueroa	20	2	0	7	0	20	2	0	7	0
17	MF	(United States)	Nico Lemoine	11	0	0	1	0	11	0	0	1	0
18	DF	(Chile)	José Bizama	8	0	0	1	0	8	0	0	1	0
19	FW	(Belize)	Michael Salazar	1	0	0	1	0	1	0	0	1	0
21	FW	(Venezuela)	Ronaldo Peña	1	0	0	0	0	1	0	0	0	0
22	MF	(Argentina)	Matías Vera	20	0	0	7	1	20	0	0	7	1
23	FW	(Colombia)	Darwin Quintero	22	7	10	5	0	22	7	10	5	0
24	MF	(El Salvador)	Darwin Cerén	20	1	4	3	0	20	1	4	3	0
26	GK	(United States)	Michael Nelson	0	0	0	0	0	0	0	0	0	0
27	MF	(Honduras)	Boniek García	18	0	0	5	0	18	0	0	5	0
28	DF	(United States)	Erik McCue (Note: Loaned out during the season)	0	0	0	0	0	0	0	0	0	0
29	DF	(United States)	Sam Junqua	9	1	0	0	0	9	1	0	0	0
32	DF	(New Zealand)	Kyle Adams	0	0	0	0	0	0	0	0	0	0
36	DF	(Argentina)	Víctor Cabrera	10	0	0	1	0	10	0	0	1	0
55	GK	(United States)	Cody Cropper	0	0	0	0	0	0	0	0	0	0

Source: Season Statistics and Match reports in Competitive
