= Alejandro Fuenmayor =

Venezuelan footballer (born 1996)

Personal information
- Full name: Alejandro Enriquez Fuenmayor Castillo
- Date of birth: 29 August 1996 (age 30)
- Place of birth: Maracaibo, Venezuela
- Height: 1.86 m (6 ft 1 in)
- Position: Defender

Youth career
- Carabobo

Senior career*
Years	Team	Apps	(Gls)
2013–2018	Carabobo	71	(2)
2018–2021	Houston Dynamo	38	(3)
2019	→ Rio Grande Valley FC (loan)	6	(0)
2022	Oakland Roots	29	(0)
2023–2025	Phoenix Rising	62	(0)
2025	Monagas	3	(0)
- * Club domestic league appearances and goals as of 11:32, 16 November 2024 (UTC)

Alejandro Enriquez Fuenmayor Castillo (born 29 August 1996) is a Venezuelan professional footballer as a defender.

== Career ==
=== Carabobo ===
After coming through the youth ranks with Carabobo, Fuenmayor made his professional debut at the age of 18 on 22 September 2013 in a 2–0 win against Deportivo La Guaira. He made 11 starts in the 2016 Primera División as Carabobo qualified for the Copa Libertadores for the first time in their history by topping the aggregate table. Fuenmayor and Carabobo had a strong 2017. Carabobo finished on top of the aggregate table for the year, qualifying them for the 2018 Copa Libertadores. Fuenmayor started 32 games and anchored the best defense in the league, only allowing 25 goals in 34 games. Carabobo also reached the semi-finals of the Apertura and Clausura tournaments. Fuenmayor's performances were rewarded as he was named to the Team of the year.

=== Houston Dynamo ===
After five seasons with Carabobo, Fuenmayor moved to Major League Soccer side Houston Dynamo on 16 January 2018. Fuenmayor made his Dynamo debut on 31 March 2018 in a 2–0 loss against the New England Revolution. He scored his first goal with the Dynamo on 5 May in a 3–2 win against the LA Galaxy. Fuenmayor scored 3 goals and had 1 assists from 22 league appearances in his first season in Houston, but it was a disappointing league campaign as the Dynamo finished 9th in the Western Conference and missed out on the playoffs. Houston did enjoy a successful cup run as Fuenmayor helped lead the Dynamo to their first ever U.S. Open Cup title, playing four times in the competition including starting the final, a 3–0 win over the Philadelphia Union.

Fuenmayor made his first appearance of the 2019 season on 2 March, a 1–1 draw with Real Salt Lake in the Dynamo's MLS season opener. On 5 March, he made his first career appearance in a continental competition when he started in a 2–0 loss to Tigres UANL in the CONCACAF Champions League. Fuenmayor struggled to remain in the Dynamo starting lineup in 2019 and spent time on loan with the Dynamo's USL Championship affiliate, Rio Grande Valley FC throughout the season, making six appearances for the Toros. He ended the season with eight MLS appearances and 12 appearances in all competitions for the Dynamo during another poor season for the team, missing out on the playoffs again.

Fuenmayor saw his playing time decrease further in 2020 under new head coach Tab Ramos, making five appearances all season as the Dynamo struggled once again, failing to qualify for the playoffs for the 3rd straight season.

During the 2021 season, Fuenmayor only made three appearances. The Dynamo finished last in the Western Conference for the second consecutive season as Houston failed to qualify for the playoffs for the fourth straight year.

Fuenmayor's contract with Houston expired following the 2021 season.

=== Oakland Roots ===
On 5 January 2022, Fuenmayor signed with Oakland Roots SC. He left Oakland following their 2022 season.

=== Phoenix Rising FC ===
Fuenmayor signed with Phoenix Rising FC on 23 December 2022.

== Career statistics ==
As of 23 October 2022

Club Performance			League		Cup		Continental		Other		Total	
Club	Season	League	Apps	Goals	Apps	Goals	Apps	Goals	Apps	Goals	Apps	Goals
Venezuela			League		Copa Venezuela		South America		Other		Total	
Carabobo	2013-14	Venezuelan Primera División	11	0	0	0	—		—		11	0
Carabobo	2014-15	Venezuelan Primera División	5	0	0	0	—		—		5	0
Carabobo	2015	Venezuelan Primera División	8	0	1	0	0	0	—		9	0
Carabobo	2016	Venezuelan Primera División	15	0	0	0	—		—		15	0
Carabobo	2017	Venezuelan Primera División	32	2	3	0	0	0	—		35	2
Carabobo	Carabobo Total		71	2	4	0	0	0	0	0	75	2
United States			League		US Open Cup		North America		MLS Playoffs		Total	
Houston Dynamo	2018	Major League Soccer	22	3	4	0	—		—		26	3
Houston Dynamo	2019	Major League Soccer	8	0	2	0	2 (Note: One appearances in CONCACAF Champions League, one appearance in Leagues Cup)	0	—		12	0
Houston Dynamo	2020	Major League Soccer	5	0	—		—		—		5	0
Houston Dynamo	2021	Major League Soccer	3	0	—		—		—		3	0
Houston Dynamo	Dynamo Total		38	3	4	0	2	0	0	0	46	3
United States			League		US Open Cup		North America		USLC Playoffs		Total	
Rio Grande Valley FC (loan)	2019	USL Championship	6	0	—		—		—		6	0
Oakland Roots SC	2022	USL Championship	28	0	—		—		1	0	29	0
Career Totals			143	5	10	0	2	0	1	0	156	5

== Honors ==
=== Club ===
==== Houston Dynamo ====
- U.S. Open Cup: 2018

==== Phoenix Rising ====
- USL Championship: 2023

=== Individual ===
- Venezuelan Primera División Team of the Year: 2017
- Dynamo Newcomer of the Year: 2018
