= Tomás Martínez (footballer) =

Argentine footballer

Personal information
- Date of birth: 7 March 1995 (age 31)
- Place of birth: Béccar, Argentina
- Height: 1.75 m (5 ft 9 in)
- Position: Attacking midfielder

Team information
- Current team: Barcelona SC
- Number: 23

Youth career
- Atlético Béccar
- 2001–2012: River Plate

Senior career*
Years	Team	Apps	(Gls)
2012–2016	River Plate	12	(0)
2015–2016	→ Tenerife (loan)	13	(0)
2016	→ Defensa y Justicia (loan)	14	(3)
2016–2017	Braga	3	(0)
2016–2017	Braga B	12	(3)
2017–2020	Houston Dynamo	85	(12)
2021	Defensa y Justicia	8	(0)
2022	Aldosivi	35	(1)
2023–2025	Melgar	99	(16)
2026–	Barcelona SC	0	(0)

International career
2015	Argentina U20	10	(1)
- * Club domestic league appearances and goals as of 22:39, 30 December 2025 (UTC)

Tomás Martínez (born 7 March 1995) is an Argentine professional footballer who plays as an attacking midfielder for Barcelona SC.

== Club career ==
=== River Plate ===
Born in Béccar, Martínez joined River Plate's youth setup in 2001, after starting out at Atlético Béccar. In July 2011 he signed his first professional contract, with a €10 million clause after being linked to Arsenal and FC Barcelona.

On 24 April 2013 Martínez made his first team debut, coming on as a second-half substitute for Mauro Díaz in a 0–1 Copa Argentina home loss against Estudiantes Buenos Aires. He made his Primera División debut on 23 June, starting in a 3–1 home win against San Martín San Juan.

In 2014 Martínez made four appearances in the Copa Sudamericana to help River win their first continental tournament in 17 years. However he only made nine league appearances on the season.

Because chances with the first team were limited, on 18 August 2015 Martínez was loaned to Segunda División side Tenerife, in a season-long deal.

In February 2016, River Plate cancelled the loan with CD Tenerife and sent Martínez on loan to Primera División club Defensa y Justicia. He would make his debut for Defensa y Justicia on 7 February against Unión de Santa Fe and scored his first ever Primera División goal on 17 February against Atlético de Rafaela. Martínez would find more success back in Argentina then he did in Spain, scoring three goals and picking up two assists for Defensa y Justicia.

=== Braga ===
On 2 July 2016, River Plate sold Martínez to Primeira Liga club Braga. He would make his Braga debut on 22 August against Rio Ave. Martínez made his European debut on 29 August in a 2–0 defeat to Shakhtar Donetsk in a Europa League match. However, Martínez would struggled to find playing time, only making two more league appearances with the first team. He would spend the second half of the season with the club's second team, Braga B.

=== Houston Dynamo ===
Martínez signed with the Houston Dynamo of Major League Soccer on 17 July 2017 as a young designated player. He would make his Dynamo debut on 12 August, coming on as a sub against the San Jose Earthquakes. He scored his first goal with the Dynamo against the LA Galaxy on 27 September. In the 2018 MLS Cup Playoffs, Martínez played in every game for the Dynamo and picked up an assist as the Dynamo reached the Western Conference Finals. However he picked up a red card in the final game that forced him to miss the first game of the 2018 season.

Although the Dynamo missed the playoffs in 2018, Martínez enjoyed the most productive season of his career. He finished the year as the Dynamo's team leader in assists with 13 Martínez got his first ever MLS regular season assist on 10 March against the Vancouver Whitecaps. He picked up a goal and assist on 14 April against the Earthquakes and made his first ever MLS team of the weak as a result of his strong performance. Martínez played in four games and recorded an assist in the US Open Cup as he helped the Dynamo win their first Open Cup in club history. On 28 October, he picked up two assists as the Dynamo came back from 2–0 down to defeat the Galaxy 3–2, eliminating the Galaxy from the playoffs.

Martínez made his CONCACAF Champions League 19 February in a 1–0 win over C.D. Guastatoya. He picked up his first assist of the year on 9 March in a 2–1 over the Montreal Impact. Martínez scored his first goal of the season on 13 April, curling in a left footed shot to the side netting to give Houston a 2–1 win over San Jose. He would find the back of the net again on 27 April, this time hitting a half volley with his left foot into the left corner in a 2–0 Houston win against the Columbus Crew. On 11 June, Martínez picked up a goal an assist to help Houston get a 3–2 win over Austin Bold in a US Open Cup match. On 18 June, he would find the back of the net in their next Open Cup match, however the Dynamo would lose 3–2 to Minnesota United. Martínez enjoyed his most productive month of the season in July, scoring goals in Dynamo wins against New York Red Bulls and Toronto FC as well as picking up an assist in a 3–1 defeat to LAFC. He would in the season with 7 goals and 4 assists in 37 appearances across all competitions as the Dynamo finished 10th in the Western Conference, missing out on the playoffs for the second straight season.

Prior to the 2020 season, the Dynamo hired Tab Ramos as head coach, replacing Wilmer Cabrera, who had been in charge for the previous three seasons. Ramos primarily used lineups without a central attacking midfielder, reducing the opportunities for Martínez to play in his preferred position. Martínez ended the season having made only 11 appearances, 3 of them starts, with no goals or assists. Despite the change in coach and tactics, on field results did not improve, with Houston missing the playoffs for the third consecutive year.

His contract option was declined by Houston following their 2020 season.

=== Defensa y Justicia ===
On 30 January 2021, Martínez signed with Defensa y Justicia of the Argentine Primera División.

=== Aldosivi ===
On 5 January 2022, Martínez moved to fellow league club Aldosivi.

== Personal ==
Martínez received his U.S. green card in January 2019, which qualifies him as a domestic player for MLS roster purposes.

== Career statistics ==
As of 12 November 2020

Appearances and goals by club, season and competition
Club	Season	League			National cup (Note: Appearances in Copa Argentina, Copa del Rey, Taça de Portugal, and US Open Cup)		League cup (Note: Appearances in Taça da Liga and MLS Cup Playoffs)		Continental (Note: Appearances in Copa Sudamericana, UEFA Europa League, and CONCACAF Champions League)		Total	
Club	Season	Division	Apps	Goals	Apps	Goals	Apps	Goals	Apps	Goals	Apps	Goals
River Plate	2012–13	Argentine Primera División	1	0	1	0	—		—		1	0
River Plate	2013–14	Argentine Primera División	0	0	2	0	—		0	0	2	0
River Plate	2014	Argentine Primera División	9	0	0	0	—		4	0	13	0
River Plate	2015	Argentine Primera División	2	0	0	0	—		0	0	2	0
River Plate	Total		12	0	3	0	0	0	4	0	19	0
Tenerife (loan)	2015–16	Segunda División	13	0	1	0	—		—		14	0
Defensa y Justicia (loan)	2016	Argentine Primera División	14	3	1	0	—		—		15	3
Braga	2016–17	Primeira Liga	3	0	0	0	1	0	1	0	5	0
Braga B	2016–17	LigaPro	12	3	—		—		—		12	3
Houston Dynamo	2017	MLS	9	2	0	0	5	0	—		14	2
Houston Dynamo	2018	MLS	32	5	4	0	—		—		36	5
Houston Dynamo	2019	MLS	33	5	2	2	—		2	0	37	7
Houston Dynamo	2020	MLS	11	0	0	0	—		—		11	0
Houston Dynamo	Total		85	12	6	2	5	0	2	0	98	14
Career total			139	17	11	2	6	0	7	0	163	19

== Honours ==
River Plate

- Argentina Primera Division: 2014 Final
- Copa Sudamericana: 2014

Houston Dynamo

- US Open Cup: 2018

Argentina U20

- South American Youth Football Championship: 2015
