= Darwin Cerén =

Salvadoran footballer (born 1989)

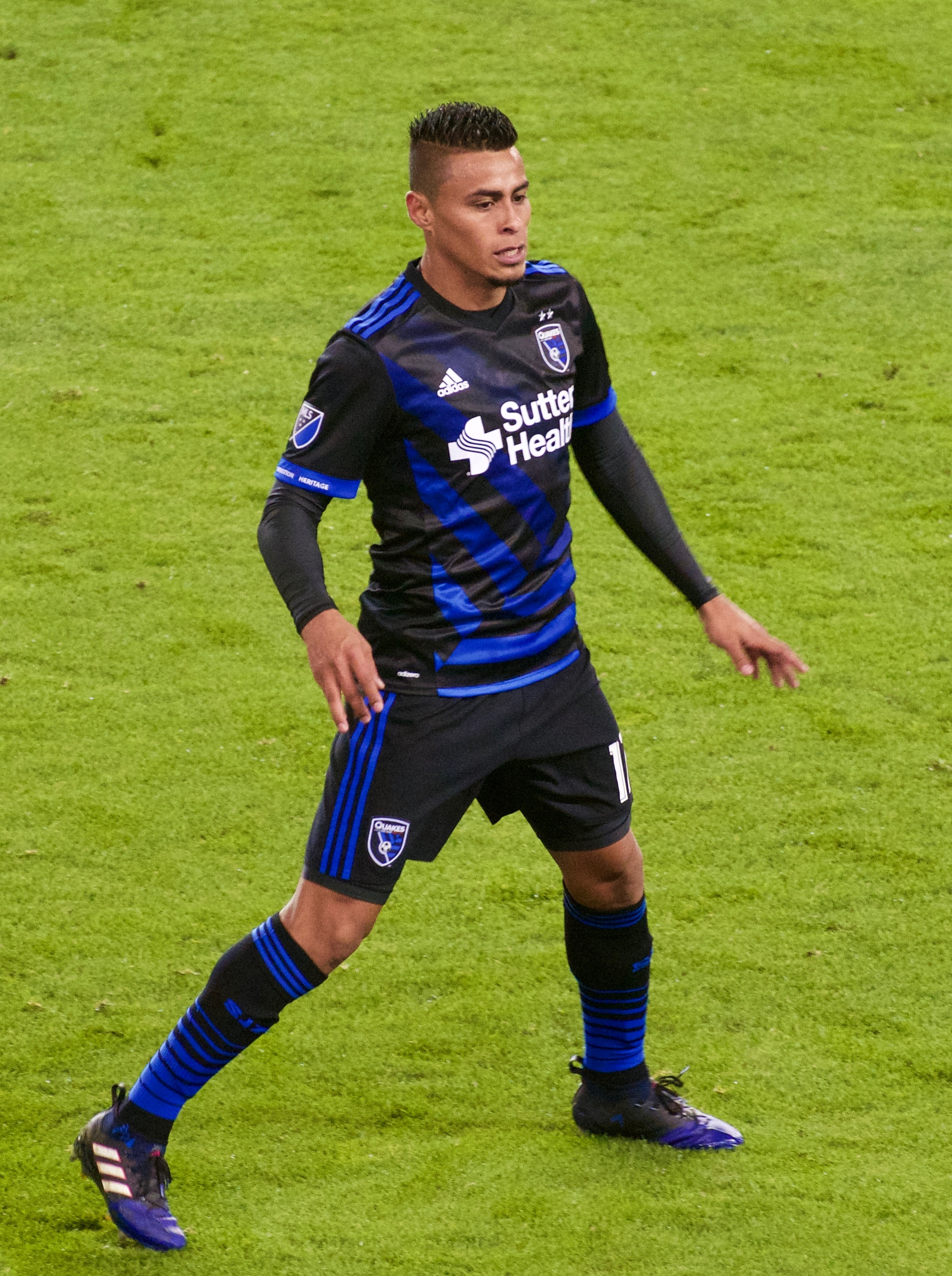
- Cerén with the San Jose Earthquakes in 2017

Personal information
- Full name: Darwin Adelso Cerén Delgado
- Date of birth: 31 December 1989 (age 36)
- Place of birth: Quezaltepeque, El Salvador
- Height: 1.78 m (5 ft 10 in)
- Position: Defensive midfielder

Team information
- Current team: Inter Santa Tecla
- Number: 26

Senior career*
Years	Team	Apps	(Gls)
2009–2014	Juventud Independiente	87	(15)
2014–2016	Orlando City	69	(4)
2016–2017	San Jose Earthquakes	35	(0)
2018–2022	Houston Dynamo	118	(3)
2023-2025	Águila	130	(18)
2025-	Inter Santa Tecla	27	(2)

International career^{‡}
2012	El Salvador U23	3	(0)
2012–	El Salvador	109	(5)
- * Club domestic league appearances and goals as of 19:30, 1 June 2025 (UTC) ‡ National team caps and goals as of 17 June 2025 (UTC)

Darwin Adelso Cerén Delgado (born 31 December 1989) is a Salvadoran professional footballer who plays as a defensive midfielder for Primera División club Inter Santa Tecla, which he captains, and the El Salvador national team. He is the most capped player in El Salvador history.

== Club career ==
=== Juventud Independiente ===
Cerén began his professional career with Juventud Independiente in 2009. Prior to joining Juventud, Cerén was attending university when his father lost his job. Unable to afford school, Cerén dropped out and started working at a brick-making company. While working there, he attended a tryout for Juventud and earned a contract. Originally he continued to work for the brick company while playing for Juventud, but soon quit to focus fully on a career in football. Along with his brother Óscar, he helped them earn promotion from the second division to the first division, with both brothers scoring in the final. In total, he made 87 appearances for the club and scored 15 goals before departing in February 2014. In the summer of 2013, he went on trial with Balıkesirspor of the Turkish second division, but a deal could not be worked out.

=== Orlando City SC ===
It was announced on 6 February 2014 that Cerén had signed for Orlando City SC of USL Pro for the 2014 USL Pro season and for 2015 as Orlando entered Major League Soccer, becoming the club's third addition to their MLS roster. Cerén made his Orlando City debut on 22 March in a 1–1 draw with the Charleston Battery. On 16 August he scored his first two goals for the club, picking up a brace in a 3–1 win over the Harrisburg City Islanders. Cerén went on to make 23 league appearances for the club, scoring two goals and assisting on three others during the season. Cerén helped Orlando win the Commissioner's Cup for finishing with the best record during the regular season. Orlando failed to replicate their success in the playoffs, suffering a surprise defeat to the Harrisburg City Islanders in the first round.

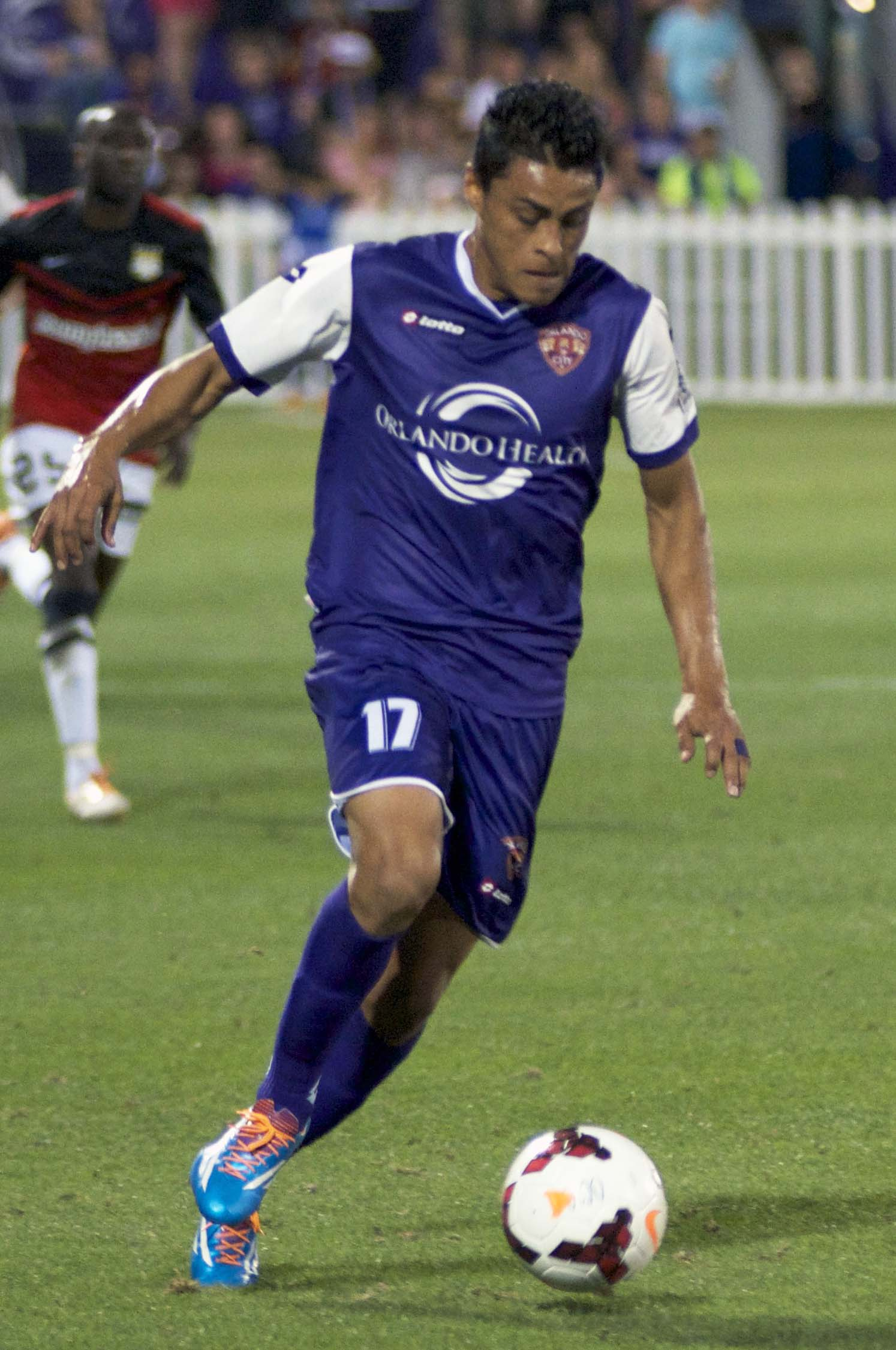
Cerén playing for Orlando City in 2014

Cerén made his MLS debut on 8 March 2015 in a 1–1 draw with New York City FC. He scored his first MLS goal in a 4–0 win over the LA Galaxy on 17 May. On August 8, Cerén scored once in a 5–2 win over the Columbus Crew. He enjoyed a strong first season in MLS, ending the year with 2 goals and 2 assists from 26 games, being named Orlando City Players’ Player of the Year, and winning the 2015 MLS Latino del Año award. It was a disappointing season as a team, as OCSC missed out on the playoffs.

Prior to the 2016 season, Cerén signed a new contract with Orlando. The Lions opened the season on 6 March with a 2–2 draw against Real Salt Lake. However, Cerén was sent off late in the first half for a red card. After his suspension, Cerén returned and started Orlando's next 8 games before missing a month due to an ankle injury. He made 16 appearances and had two assists in league play for Orlando in 2016 prior to being traded.

=== San Jose Earthquakes ===
On 3 August 2016, Darwin Cerén was acquired by the San Jose Earthquakes in exchange for midfielder Matías Pérez García and an international roster slot through the end of the 2016 MLS season. He made his Earthquakes debut on 5 August in a 0–0 draw with NYCFC. Cerén ended his first season with twelve appearances, nine of them being starts. He was not able to help the Earthquakes save their 2016 season, as San Jose finished ninth in the Western Conference and failed to qualify for the playoffs.

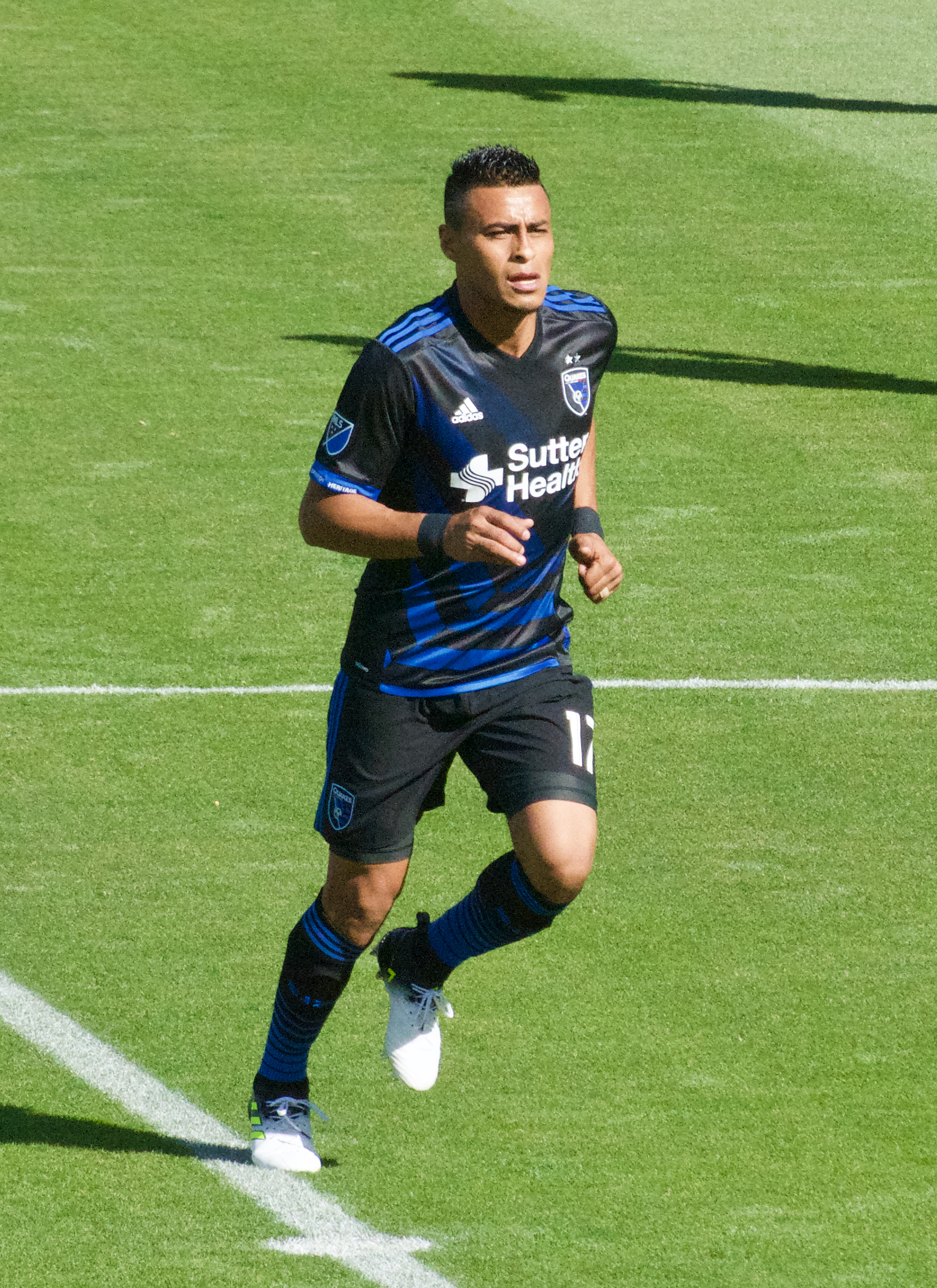
Cerén playing for San Jose in 2017

After not appearing in the first three games of the 2017 season, Cerén then played in twelve straight games for the Quakes before missing a game due to two yellow cards. After he returned from the 2017 Gold Cup, Cerén picked up his first assist as an Earthquake to give San Jose a 1–0 win over the Colorado Rapids. The 2017 season was a better for both San Jose and Cerén, as he made 21 appearances and picked up two assists to help the Earthquakes qualify for the playoffs for the first time in four seasons. Cerén would play the full 90 minutes of their knockout round matchup with the Vancouver Whitecaps, but San Jose would lose 5–0.

=== Houston Dynamo ===
On 19 January 2018, Cerén was traded to the Houston Dynamo in exchange for $100,000 in General Allocation Money and $75,000 in Targeted Allocation Money. He made his Dynamo debut on 3 March 2018 in a 4–0 win over Atlanta United, a game in which he scored his first goal since 2015. He picked up a leg injury on 11 May that forced him to miss just over a month. Cerén helped the Dynamo win the 2018 US Open Cup, making three appearances in the tournament, including in the final, and picking up one assist along the way. He made 27 appearances and scored one goal across all competitions in his first season with Houston. Despite a successful cup run, it was a disappointing league campaign for Houston, missing out on the playoffs after finishing ninth in the Western Conference.

Cerén and the Dynamo opened the 2019 season on 19 February, with Cerén making his CONCACAF Champions League debut off of the bench in a 1–0 win at C.D. Guastatoya. He scored his first goal of the season on 26 June in a 2–1 defeat to the New England Revolution. The offseason addition of Matías Vera saw playing time harder to come by for Cerén in his second season in Houston. He would only make 16 appearances in all competitions in the year, with only six of them being starts. Houston had another poor season in league play, missing out on the playoffs again. His contract expired at the end of the 2019 season, making him a free agent. On 20 December, he signed a one-year contract to remain in Houston.

Under new head coach Tab Ramos, Cerén had a larger role in 2020. Between 25 August and 5 September, Cerén recorded an assist in three straight games, helping Houston win each game. On October 7, Cerén scored once in a 20-win over FC Dallas. In a shortened season due to the COVID-19 Pandemic, Cerén played in 20 of a possible 23 games, with 18 of them being starts, scored once, and recorded a career-high four assists. Despite the strong season from Cerén, it was another disappointing year for the Dynamo, finishing last in the Western Conference and missing the playoffs for the third consecutive year.

Cerén made his first appearance of the 2021 season on 16 April in Houston's opening match, coming on as a substitute in a 2–1 win over San Jose. On 4 August, he picked up a red card after elbowing an Austin FC player in the head while shielding the ball. Houston went on to lose the game 3–2. He received an additional one-game suspension from the MLS Disciplinary Committee on top of the automatic suspension for a red card. Cerén ended the season with 2 assists from 25 appearances as the Dynamo finished last in the West again, missing the playoffs for the fourth straight season.

Ceren made 27 appearances, 11 of them starts, and had 1 assist during the 2022 regular season, with the Dynamo missing the playoffs again after finishing 13th in the conference. His contract expired following the 2022 season.

=== C.D. Águila ===
On 31 December 2022, Cerén returned to El Salvador, signing with C.D. Águila in the Primera División. He made his Águila debut on 28 January 2023, playing the full 90 minutes in a 2–1 win over Santa Tecla.

== International career ==
Darwin Cerén made his debut for El Salvador in a friendly against New Zealand on 24 May 2012. The game ended in a 2–2 draw. He scored his first goal against Venezuela in a 2–1 loss.

Cerén captained El Salvador in the 2017 Gold Cup through four matches and led the squad to a 2–0 defeat in the quarterfinals to the United States, in the process drawing heated criticism for biting US defender Omar Gonzalez in the back on a corner kick during the game. He received a three-match international ban for this.

Cerén was on 5 Gold Cup squads and (2013, 2015, 2017, 2019, and 2021) and a part of 3 Copa Centroamericana squads (2013, 2014, and 2017).

On 10 June 2025, he featured in his 100th international match for El Salvador in a 1–1 draw against Suriname during the 2026 FIFA World Cup qualification, becoming the first Salvadoran to achieve this feat.

== Personal life ==
In early 2015, Cerén received his U.S. green card which qualifies him as a domestic player for MLS roster purposes.

Cerén's father played professionally in the Segunda División de El Salvador. Cerén is the oldest of four siblings. His two sisters, Brenda and Paola, represent the El Salvador women's national team, while his brother Óscar plays for the El Salvador national team and A.D. Isidro Metapán.

Cerén met his wife Delia in 2010. They got married in a civil ceremony in 2012 and in a religious ceremony in 2017. Together they have four children.

== Career statistics ==
=== Club ===
As of matches played 21 February 2023

Club	Season	League			Cup		Playoffs		Continental		Total	
Club	Season	Division	Apps	Goals	Apps	Goals	Apps	Goals	Apps	Goals	Apps	Goals
Juventud	2011–12	Salvadoran Primera División	28	0	—		—		—		28	0
Juventud	2012–13	Salvadoran Primera División	34	10	—		—		—		34	10
Juventud	2013–14	Salvadoran Primera División	21	5	—		—		—		21	5
Juventud	Total		83	15	0	0	0	0	0	0	83	15
Orlando City (USL)	2014	USL	23	2	2	0	0	0	—		25	2
Orlando City (USL)	Total		23	2	2	0	0	0	0	0	25	2
Orlando City	2015	MLS	26	2	2	0	—		—		26	2
Orlando City	2016	MLS	16	0	0	0	—		—		16	0
Orlando City	Total		42	2	2	0	0	0	0	0	44	2
San Jose Earthquakes	2016	MLS	12	0	0	0	—		—		12	0
San Jose Earthquakes	2017	MLS	21	0	1	0	1	0	—		23	0
San Jose Earthquakes	Total		33	0	1	0	1	0	0	0	35	0
Houston Dynamo	2018	MLS	24	1	3	0	—		—		27	1
Houston Dynamo	2019	MLS	13	1	0	0	—		3 (Note: Two appearances in CONCACAF Champions League, one appearance in Leagues Cup)	0	16	1
Houston Dynamo	2020	MLS	20	1	—		—		—		20	1
Houston Dynamo	2021	MLS	25	0	—		—		—		25	0
Houston Dynamo	2022	MLS	27	0	3	0	—		—		30	0
Houston Dynamo	Total		109	3	6	0	0	0	3	0	118	3
C.D. Águila	2022–23	Salvadoran Primera División	6	0	—		—		0	0	6	0
Career total			296	22	11	0	1	0	3	0	311	22

=== International ===
As of match played 17 June 2025.

El Salvador
Year	Apps	Goals
2012	6	0
2013	11	1
2014	7	0
2015	10	1
2016	3	0
2017	9	0
2018	1	0
2019	11	1
2020	2	0
2021	20	1
2022	9	1
2023	0	0
2024	9 (Note: Includes two Nations League matches played against non-FIFA member Bonaire, which are counted as official matches by the Salvadoran Football Federation.)	0
2025	3	0
Total	101	5

==== International goals ====
Scores and results list El Salvador's goal tally first.

No.	Date	Venue	Opponent	Score	Result	Competition
1.	22 May 2013	Estadio Metropolitano de Mérida, Mérida, Venezuela	Venezuela	1–0	1–2	Friendly
2.	16 June 2015	Estadio Cuscatlán, San Salvador, El Salvador	Saint Kitts and Nevis	1–0	4–1	2018 FIFA World Cup qualification
3.	7 September 2019	Estadio Cuscatlán, San Salvador, El Salvador	Saint Lucia	2–0	3–0	2019–20 CONCACAF Nations League B
4.	12 June 2021	Warner Park, Basseterre, Saint Kitts and Nevis	Saint Kitts and Nevis	4–0	4–0	2022 FIFA World Cup qualification
5.	30 January 2022	Estadio Olímpico Metropolitano, San Pedro Sula, Honduras	Honduras	2–0	2–0	2022 FIFA World Cup qualification

== Honours ==
Juventud Independiente

- Segunda División: 2011 Clausura

Orlando City SC (USL)

- Commissioner's Cup: 2014

Houston Dynamo

- U.S. Open Cup: 2018

Aguila

- Primera División Salvadorean : Apertura 2023

Individual

- Latino Del Año MLS: 2015
- Orlando City Players' Player of the Year: 2015
- Copa Centroamericana Best XI: 2017

== See also ==
- List of men's footballers with 100 or more international caps
