= 2020 MLS expansion draft =

Player draft for MLS teams

2020 MLS Expansion Draft

General information
- Date: December 15, 2020

Overview
- 5 total selections in 5 rounds
- Expansion teams: Austin FC
- Expansion season: 2021

The 2020 MLS Expansion Draft was a special draft for the Major League Soccer expansion team Austin FC that was held on December 15, 2020. The list of players available for selection was released on December 14, 2020.

== Format ==
Teams who had players selected in the 2019 MLS Expansion Draft are exempt. These teams were Atlanta United FC, FC Cincinnati, Columbus Crew, Los Angeles FC, Minnesota United FC, New England Revolution, New York City FC, Portland Timbers, Seattle Sounders FC, and Sporting Kansas City. All other teams returning from the 2020 season were subject to the draft. These teams had 12 protection slots that they could apply to any draft eligible player on their senior, supplemental, and reserve rosters. Players who have not graduated from Generation Adidas, and homegrown players age 25 and under as of the end of the 2020 season were not eligible for the draft. Players with contracts expiring at the end of the season, designated players, and players with no-trade clauses were part of a team's roster and were eligible for the draft. In the case of player's with no-trade clauses, a team had to use one of their protection slots for that player. If a team had a players selected in the draft, that team became exempt from any further picks in the draft. The expansion team, Austin FC was given 5 picks for the draft.

== Expansion Draft picks ==
Pick	MLS team	Player	Previous team	Notes
1	Austin FC	Danny Hoesen	San Jose Earthquakes	
2	Austin FC	Jared Stroud	New York Red Bulls	
3	Austin FC	Brady Scott	Nashville SC	
4	Austin FC	Joe Corona	LA Galaxy	Rights were acquired by Houston Dynamo FC in Stage Two of the MLS Re-Entry Draft
5	Austin FC	Kamal Miller	Orlando City SC	Traded to Montreal Impact for $225,000 in General Allocation Money and a 2021 1st round pick (11th overall)

== Team-by-team-breakdown ==
=== Chicago Fire FC ===
As of December 14, 2020

Exposed
Micheal Azira
Brandt Bronico
Elliot Collier
Johan Kappelhof
Kenneth Kronholm
Wyatt Omsberg
C. J. Sapong
Boris Sekulić
Connor Sparrow

=== Colorado Rapids ===
As of December 14, 2020

Exposed
Steven Beitashour
Nicolas Benezet
Niki Jackson
Nicolás Mezquida
Drew Moor
Andre Rawls
Collen Warner

=== FC Dallas ===
As of December 14, 2020

Exposed
Francis Atuahene
Nkosi Burgess
Santiago Mosquera
Reto Ziegler
Kyle Zobeck

=== D.C. United ===
As of December 14, 2020

Exposed
Mohammed Abu
Frédéric Brillant
Earl Edwards Jr.
Oniel Fisher
Felipe Martins
Yordy Reyna
Gelmin Rivas
Chris Seitz
Axel Sjöberg

=== Houston Dynamo FC ===
As of December 14, 2020

Exposed
Kyle Adams
José Bizama
Víctor Cabrera
Cody Cropper
Maynor Figueroa
Alejandro Fuenmayor
Boniek García
Nico Lemoine
Mauro Manotas
Tomás Martínez
Ronaldo Peña
Michael Salazar
Aljaž Struna
Wilfried Zahibo

=== LA Galaxy ===
As of December 14, 2020

Exposed
David Bingham
Joe Corona
Emil Cuello
Rolf Feltscher
Yony González
Giancarlo González
Emiliano Insúa
Perry Kitchen
Jørgen Skjelvik
Justin Vom Steeg
Gordon Wild

=== Inter Miami CF ===
As of December 14, 2020

Exposed
George Acosta
Juan Agudelo
Mikey Ambrose
Jay Chapman
A. J. DeLaGarza
Federico Higuaín
Jerome Kiesewetter
Christian Makoun
Alvas Powell
Jairo Quinteros
Luis Robles
Brek Shea
Wil Trapp
Denso Ulysse

=== Montreal Impact ===
As of December 14, 2020

Exposed
Rudy Camacho
Jorge Corrales
Clément Diop
Rod Fanni
Anthony Jackson-Hamel
Bojan Krkić
Orji Okwonkwo
Jukka Raitala
Steeven Saba
Shamit Shome
Maximiliano Urruti

=== Nashville SC ===
As of December 14, 2020

Exposed
David Accam
Jalil Anibaba
Dominique Badji
Brayan Beckeles
C. J. Cochran
Abu Danladi
Tanner Dieterich
Luke Haakenson
Matt LaGrassa
Cameron Lancaster
Eric Miller
Miguel Nazarit
Elliot Panicco
Brady Scott
Ken Tribbett
Taylor Washington
Alan Winn

=== New York Red Bulls ===
As of December 14, 2020

Exposed
Mandela Egbo
David Jensen
Chris Lema
Kendall McIntosh
Ryan Meara
Sean Nealis
Jason Pendant
Marc Rzatkowski
Patrick Seagrist
Jared Stroud
Amro Tarek
Samuel Tetteh

=== Orlando City SC ===
As of December 14, 2020

Exposed
Matheus Aiás
Tesho Akindele
Alexander Alvarado
Josué Colmán
Alex DeJohn
Joey DeZart
Dom Dwyer
Kamal Miller
Santiago Patiño
Robinho
Oriol Rosell
Brian Rowe
Kyle Smith

=== Philadelphia Union ===
As of December 14, 2020

Exposed
Joe Bendik
Aurélien Collin
Warren Creavalle
Ilsinho
Michee Ngalina
Matej Oravec
Andrew Wooten

=== Real Salt Lake ===
As of December 14, 2020

Exposed
Alvin Jones
Zac MacMath
Ashtone Morgan
Luke Mulholland
Nedum Onuoha
Justin Portillo
Andrew Putna
Giuseppe Rossi

=== San Jose Earthquakes ===
As of December 14, 2020

Exposed
Matt Bersano
Eric Calvillo
Luis Felipe Fernandes
Danny Hoesen
Guram Kashia
Paul Marie
Valeri Qazaishvili
Jack Skahan

=== Toronto FC ===
As of December 14, 2020

Exposed
Laurent Ciman
Tsubasa Endoh
Tony Gallacher
Erickson Gallardo
Justin Morrow
Patrick Mullins
Pablo Piatti
Kevin Silva
Eriq Zavaleta

=== Vancouver Whitecaps FC ===
As of December 14, 2020

Exposed
Derek Cornelius
Jasser Khmiri
Bryan Meredith
David Milinković
Fredy Montero
Andy Rose
