= 2017 Major League Soccer season =

22nd season of Major League Soccer

Major League Soccer
- Season: 2017
- Dates: March 3 – October 22 (regular season); October 25 – December 9 (playoffs)
- Teams: 22
- MLS Cup: Toronto FC (1st title)
- Supporters' Shield: Toronto FC (1st shield)
- 2019 Champions League (United States): Sporting Kansas City (Note: As 2017 U.S. Open Cup winner)
- 2018 Champions League (Canada): Toronto FC (Note: As 2016 and 2017 Canadian Championship winner)
- Matches: 374
- Goals: 1,110 (2.97 per match)
- Top goalscorer: Nemanja Nikolić (24 goals)
- Best goalkeeper: Stefan Frei (13 shutouts)
- Biggest home win: 7 goals: ATL 7–0 NE (Sep 13)
- Biggest away win: 5 goals: MIN 1–6 ATL (Mar 12)
- Highest scoring: 8 goals: DAL 6–2 RSL (Jun 3); LA 2–6 RSL (Jul 4); TOR 3–5 MTL (Sep 20)
- Longest winning run: 6 games: Toronto FC (Apr 21 – May 13)
- Longest unbeaten run: 13 games: Seattle Sounders FC (Jun 17 – Sep 23)
- Longest winless run: 10 games: LA Galaxy (Jun 24 – Aug 27)
- Longest losing run: 6 games: D.C. United (Jun 24 – Jul 29)
- Highest attendance: 71,874; ATL 2–2 TOR (Oct 22)
- Lowest attendance: 10,165; NYC 1–1 HOU (Sep 23 at East Hartford)
- Total attendance: 8,269,919
- Average attendance: 22,112

The 2017 Major League Soccer season was the 22nd season of Major League Soccer, top division of soccer in the United States and Canada. The regular season began on March 3, 2017 and concluded on October 22, 2017. The MLS Cup playoffs began on October 25, 2017 and concluded with MLS Cup 2017 on December 9, 2017.

Two new clubs joined the league as expansion franchises: Atlanta United FC and Minnesota United FC. The two franchises were the 21st and 22nd teams in the league.

Seattle Sounders FC were the defending MLS Cup champions, while FC Dallas were the defending Supporters' Shield champions. Toronto FC became the first Canadian team to win the Cup and Shield. Toronto's win of the Canadian Championship in the same year earned them the first domestic treble by an MLS side.

== Teams ==
=== Stadiums and locations ===
Western Conference
Team	Stadium	Capacity
Colorado Rapids	Dick's Sporting Goods Park	18,061
FC Dallas	Toyota Stadium	20,500
Houston Dynamo	BBVA Compass Stadium	22,039
LA Galaxy	StubHub Center	27,000
Minnesota United FC	TCF Bank Stadium	21,895
Portland Timbers	Providence Park	21,144
Real Salt Lake	Rio Tinto Stadium	20,213
San Jose Earthquakes	Avaya Stadium	18,000
Seattle Sounders FC	CenturyLink Field	39,419
Sporting Kansas City	Children's Mercy Park	18,467
Vancouver Whitecaps FC	BC Place	22,120

Eastern Conference
Team	Stadium	Capacity
Atlanta United FC	Mercedes-Benz Stadium	42,500
Chicago Fire	Toyota Park	20,000
Columbus Crew SC	Mapfre Stadium	19,968
D.C. United	RFK Stadium	20,000
Montreal Impact	Saputo Stadium	20,801
New England Revolution	Gillette Stadium	20,000
New York City FC	Yankee Stadium	30,321
New York Red Bulls	Red Bull Arena	25,000
Orlando City SC	Orlando City Stadium	25,500
Philadelphia Union	Talen Energy Stadium	18,500
Toronto FC	BMO Field	30,000

Locations of teams for the 2017 Major League Soccer season
Western Conference Eastern Conference

1. Non-soccer specific stadium and artificially reduced capacity.
2. Due to construction delays to Mercedes-Benz Stadium, Atlanta United FC played its home matches at Georgia Tech's Bobby Dodd Stadium during the first half of the season.

=== Personnel and sponsorship ===
Note: All teams use Adidas as kit manufacturer.

Team	Head coach	Captain	Shirt sponsor
Atlanta United FC	(Argentina) Gerardo Martino	(United States) Michael Parkhurst	American Family Insurance
Chicago Fire	(Serbia) Veljko Paunović	(Brazil) Juninho	Valspar
Colorado Rapids	(England) Steve Cooke (interim)	(United States) Tim Howard	Transamerica
Columbus Crew SC	(United States) Gregg Berhalter	(United States) Wil Trapp	Acura
D.C. United	(United States) Ben Olsen	(United States) Steve Birnbaum	Leidos
FC Dallas	(Colombia) Oscar Pareja	(United States) Matt Hedges	AdvoCare
Houston Dynamo	(Colombia) Wílmer Cabrera	(United States) Ricardo Clark	BHP Billiton
LA Galaxy	(United States) Sigi Schmid	(United States) Jermaine Jones	Herbalife
Minnesota United FC	(England) Adrian Heath	(Costa Rica) Francisco Calvo	Target
Montreal Impact	(Canada) Mauro Biello	(Canada) Patrice Bernier	Bank of Montreal
New England Revolution	(United States) Tom Soehn (interim)	(United States) Chris Tierney	UnitedHealthcare
New York City FC	(France) Patrick Vieira	(Spain) David Villa	Etihad Airways
New York Red Bulls	(United States) Jesse Marsch	(United States) Sacha Kljestan	Red Bull
Orlando City SC	(United States) Jason Kreis	(Brazil) Kaká	Orlando Health
Philadelphia Union	(United States) Jim Curtin	(United States) Alejandro Bedoya	Bimbo Bakeries USA
Portland Timbers	(United States) Caleb Porter	(England) Liam Ridgewell	Alaska Airlines
Real Salt Lake	(United States) Mike Petke	(United States) Kyle Beckerman	LifeVantage
San Jose Earthquakes	(United States) Chris Leitch	(United States) Chris Wondolowski	Sutter Health
Seattle Sounders FC	(United States) Brian Schmetzer	(Cuba) Osvaldo Alonso	Xbox
Sporting Kansas City	(United States) Peter Vermes	(United States) Matt Besler	Ivy Funds
Toronto FC	(United States) Greg Vanney	(United States) Michael Bradley	Bank of Montreal
Vancouver Whitecaps FC	(Wales) Carl Robinson	(Costa Rica) Kendall Waston	Bell Canada

=== Coaching changes ===
Team	Outgoing coach	Manner of departure	Date of vacancy	Position in table	Incoming coach	Date of appointment
Houston Dynamo	(United States) Wade Barrett (interim)	End of interim period	October 28, 2016	Pre-season	(Colombia) Wílmer Cabrera	October 28, 2016
LA Galaxy	(United States) Bruce Arena	Signed by United States	November 22, 2016	Pre-season	(United States) Curt Onalfo	December 13, 2016
Real Salt Lake	(United States) Jeff Cassar	Mutual consent	March 20, 2017	10th in West, 19th overall	(United States) Daryl Shore (interim)	March 20, 2017
Real Salt Lake	(United States) Daryl Shore (interim)	End of interim period	March 29, 2017	9th in West, 19th overall	(United States) Mike Petke	March 29, 2017
San Jose Earthquakes	(United States) Dominic Kinnear	Fired	June 25, 2017	5th in West, 12th overall	(United States) Chris Leitch	June 25, 2017
LA Galaxy	(United States) Curt Onalfo	Fired	July 27, 2017	9th in West, 19th overall	(Germany) Sigi Schmid	July 27, 2017
Colorado Rapids	(United States) Pablo Mastroeni	Fired	August 15, 2017	10th in West, 20th overall	(England) Steve Cooke (interim)	August 15, 2017
New England Revolution	(United States) Jay Heaps	Fired	September 18, 2017	8th in East, 16th overall	(United States) Tom Soehn (interim)	September 18, 2017

== Regular season ==
=== Format ===
Current teams: Each team in the league (except for expansion teams Atlanta United FC and Minnesota United FC) played 17 home and 17 away games (for a total of 34 games) using the following format:

- 2 games (home and away) against 10 teams in its conference (20 games).
- 1 extra game against 3 of its conference rivals (3 games).
- 1 game against 11 teams in the other conference (11 games).

Expansion teams: As expansion teams to the league in 2017, Atlanta United and Minnesota United played 17 home and 17 away games (for a total of 34 games) in a secondary format:

- 2 games (home and away) against 10 teams in its conference (20 games).
- 1 extra game against 2 of its conference rivals (2 games).
- 1 game against 10 teams in the other conference (10 games).
- 2 games (1 home and 1 away) against each other (2 games).

=== Eastern Conference ===
Pos	Team	Pld	W	L	T	GF	GA	GD	Pts	Qualification
1	Toronto FC	34	20	5	9	74	37	+37	69	Qualification for the conference semifinals
2	New York City FC	34	16	9	9	56	43	+13	57	Qualification for the conference semifinals
3	Chicago Fire	34	16	11	7	62	48	+14	55	Qualification for the knockout round
4	Atlanta United FC	34	15	9	10	70	40	+30	55	Qualification for the knockout round
5	Columbus Crew	34	16	12	6	53	49	+4	54	Qualification for the knockout round
6	New York Red Bulls	34	14	12	8	53	47	+6	50	Qualification for the knockout round
7	New England Revolution	34	13	15	6	53	61	−8	45	
8	Philadelphia Union	34	11	14	9	50	47	+3	42	
9	Montreal Impact	34	11	17	6	52	58	−6	39	
10	Orlando City SC	34	10	15	9	39	58	−19	39	
11	D.C. United	34	9	20	5	31	60	−29	32	

Source: MLS

=== Western Conference ===
Pos	Team	Pld	W	L	T	GF	GA	GD	Pts	Qualification
1	Portland Timbers	34	15	11	8	60	50	+10	53	Qualification for the conference semifinals
2	Seattle Sounders FC	34	14	9	11	52	39	+13	53	Qualification for the conference semifinals
3	Vancouver Whitecaps FC	34	15	12	7	50	49	+1	52	Qualification for the knockout round
4	Houston Dynamo	34	13	10	11	57	45	+12	50	Qualification for the knockout round
5	Sporting Kansas City	34	12	9	13	40	29	+11	49	Qualification for the knockout round
6	San Jose Earthquakes	34	13	14	7	39	60	−21	46	Qualification for the knockout round
7	FC Dallas	34	11	10	13	48	48	0	46	
8	Real Salt Lake	34	13	15	6	48	56	−8	45	
9	Minnesota United FC	34	10	18	6	47	70	−23	36	
10	Colorado Rapids	34	9	19	6	31	51	−20	33	
11	LA Galaxy	34	8	18	8	45	67	−22	32	

Source: MLS

=== Overall standings ===
Pos	Team	Pld	W	L	T	GF	GA	GD	Pts	Qualification
1	Toronto FC (C, S, V)	34	20	5	9	74	37	+37	69	Qualification for the CONCACAF Champions League
2	New York City FC	34	16	9	9	56	43	+13	57	
3	Chicago Fire	34	16	11	7	61	47	+14	55	
4	Atlanta United FC	34	15	9	10	70	40	+30	55	
5	Columbus Crew	34	16	12	6	53	49	+4	54	
6	Portland Timbers	34	15	11	8	60	50	+10	53	
7	Seattle Sounders FC	34	14	9	11	52	39	+13	53	
8	Vancouver Whitecaps FC	34	15	12	7	50	49	+1	52	
9	New York Red Bulls	34	14	12	8	53	47	+6	50	
10	Houston Dynamo	34	13	10	11	57	45	+12	50	
11	Sporting Kansas City (U)	34	12	9	13	40	29	+11	49	Qualification for the CONCACAF Champions League
12	San Jose Earthquakes	34	13	14	7	39	60	−21	46	
13	FC Dallas	34	11	10	13	48	48	0	46	
14	Real Salt Lake	34	13	15	6	49	55	−6	45	
15	New England Revolution	34	13	15	6	53	61	−8	45	
16	Philadelphia Union	34	11	14	9	50	47	+3	42	
17	Montreal Impact	34	11	17	6	52	58	−6	39	
18	Orlando City SC	34	10	15	9	39	58	−19	39	
19	Minnesota United FC	34	10	18	6	47	70	−23	36	
20	Colorado Rapids	34	9	19	6	31	51	−20	33	
21	D.C. United	34	9	20	5	31	60	−29	32	
22	LA Galaxy	34	8	18	8	45	67	−22	32	

Source: MLS
Rules for classification: 1) points; 2) total wins; 3) total goal differential; 4) total goals scored; 5) disciplinary points; 6) away goals scored; 7) away goal differential; 8) coin toss or drawing of lots
(C) MLS Cup champions; (S) Supporters' Shield winners; (U) U.S. Open Cup winners; (V) Canadian Championship winners

== MLS Cup playoffs ==
=== Bracket ===
Knockout round	Conference semifinals
E5	Columbus Crew SC	4	0	4
October 26 – Atlanta, Georgia
E2	New York City FC	1	2	3
E4	Atlanta United FC	0 (1)
E5	Columbus Crew SC (p)	0 (3)
Eastern Conference
E6	New York Red Bulls	1	1	2
October 25 – Bridgeview, Illinois
E1	Toronto FC	2	0	2 (a)
E3	Chicago Fire	0
E6	New York Red Bulls	4
W4	Houston Dynamo	0	2	2
October 26 – Houston, Texas
W1	Portland Timbers	0	1	1
W4	Houston Dynamo (a.e.t.)	1
W5	Sporting Kansas City	0
Western Conference
W3	Vancouver Whitecaps FC	0	0	0
October 25 – Vancouver, British Columbia
W2	Seattle Sounders FC	0	2	2
W3	Vancouver Whitecaps FC	5
W6	San Jose Earthquakes	0

Conference finals
E5	Columbus Crew SC	0	0	0
E1	Toronto FC	0	1	1
W4	Houston Dynamo	0	0	0
W2	Seattle Sounders FC	2	3	5

MLS Cup; December 9 – Toronto, Ontario
E1	Toronto FC	2
W2	Seattle Sounders FC	0

=== Knockout round ===
Team 1	Score	Team 2
Eastern Conference
Chicago Fire (E3)	0–4	New York Red Bulls (E6)
Atlanta United FC (E4)	0–0 (a.e.t.) (1–3 p)	Columbus Crew SC (E5)
Western Conference
Vancouver Whitecaps FC (W3)	5–0	San Jose Earthquakes (W6)
Houston Dynamo (W4)	1–0 (a.e.t.)	Sporting Kansas City (W5)

=== Conference semifinals ===
Team 1	Agg.	Team 2	1st leg	2nd leg
Eastern Conference
New York Red Bulls (E6)	2–2 (a)	Toronto FC (E1)	1–2	1–0
Columbus Crew SC (E5)	4–3	New York City FC (E2)	4–1	0–2
Western Conference
Houston Dynamo (W4)	2–1	Portland Timbers (W1)	0–0	2–1
Vancouver Whitecaps FC (W3)	0–2	Seattle Sounders FC (W2)	0–0	0–2

=== Conference finals ===
Team 1	Agg.	Team 2	1st leg	2nd leg
Eastern Conference
Columbus Crew SC (E5)	0–1	Toronto FC (E1)	0–0	0–1
Western Conference
Houston Dynamo (W4)	0–5	Seattle Sounders FC (W2)	0–2	0–3

=== MLS Cup ===
December 9, 2017
4:00 p.m. EST

Toronto FC	2–0	Seattle Sounders FC
Altidore 67'; Vázquez 90+4'	Report

BMO Field, Toronto, Canada
Attendance: 30,584
Referee: Allen Chapman

== Attendance ==
=== Average home attendances ===
Ranked from highest to lowest average attendance.

Pos.	Team	GP	Cumulative	High	Low	Mean
1	Atlanta United FC	17	819,404	71,874	42,511	48,200
2	Seattle Sounders FC	17	742,314	51,796	40,182	43,666
3	Toronto FC	17	470,005	29,203	25,200	27,647
4	Orlando City SC	17	425,477	25,527	23,018	25,028
5	New York City FC	17	379,455	33,679	10,165*	22,321
6	LA Galaxy	17	378,128	25,667	17,404	22,243
7	Vancouver Whitecaps FC	17	364,073	25,083	17,368	21,416
8	New York Red Bulls	17	359,977	25,219	16,213	21,175
9	Portland Timbers	17	359,448	21,144	21,144	21,144
10	Minnesota United FC	17	349,138	35,043	17,491	20,538
11	Montreal Impact	17	340,783	34,373	16,005	20,046
12	San Jose Earthquakes	17	337,873	50,617	17,256	19,875
13	Sporting Kansas City	17	332,121	20,933	18,648	19,537
14	New England Revolution	17	329,233	33,767	10,487	19,367
15	Real Salt Lake	17	319,284	20,348	16,434	18,781
16	D.C. United	17	304,369	41,418	11,972	17,904
17	Houston Dynamo	17	297,507	22,115	14,148	17,500
18	Chicago Fire	17	295,511	21,891	11,244	17,383
19	Philadelphia Union	17	285,797	18,619	15,107	16,812
20	Columbus Crew SC	17	262,469	20,391	10,318	15,439
21	Colorado Rapids	17	260,476	17,648	13,102	15,322
22	FC Dallas	17	257,077	16,291	14,016	15,122
–	Total	374	8,269,919	71,874	10,165	22,112

- game played at East Hartford

=== Highest attendances ===
Regular season

Rank	Home team	Score	Away team	Attendance	Date	Week	Stadium
1	Atlanta United FC	2–2	Toronto FC	71,874	October 22, 2017	33	Mercedes-Benz Stadium
2	Atlanta United FC	3–3	Orlando City SC	70,425	September 16, 2017	28	Mercedes-Benz Stadium
3	Atlanta United FC	1–2	New York Red Bulls	55,297	March 5, 2017	1	Bobby Dodd Stadium
4	Seattle Sounders FC	1–1	Portland Timbers	51,796	August 27, 2017	25	CenturyLink Field
5	San Jose Earthquakes	2–1	LA Galaxy	50,617	July 1, 2017	18	Stanford Stadium
6	Seattle Sounders FC	4–0	FC Dallas	48,478	October 15, 2017	32	CenturyLink Field
7	Seattle Sounders FC	1–0	Portland Timbers	47,362	May 27, 2017	13	CenturyLink Field
8	Atlanta United FC	1–3	D.C. United	46,011	April 30, 2017	9	Bobby Dodd Stadium
9	Atlanta United FC	4–0	Chicago Fire	45,922	March 18, 2017	3	Bobby Dodd Stadium
10	Seattle Sounders FC	3–1	New York Red Bulls	45,600	March 19, 2017	3	CenturyLink Field

== Player statistics ==
=== Goals ===
Rank	Player	Club	Goals
1	(Hungary) Nemanja Nikolić	Chicago Fire	24
2	(Spain) David Villa	New York City FC	22
3	(Argentina) Diego Valeri	Portland Timbers	21
4	(Venezuela) Josef Martínez	Atlanta United FC	19
5	(Norway) Ola Kamara	Columbus Crew SC	18
6	(Argentina) Ignacio Piatti	Montreal Impact	17
6	(England) Bradley Wright-Phillips	New York Red Bulls	17
8	(Italy) Sebastian Giovinco	Toronto FC	16
8	(United States) C. J. Sapong	Philadelphia Union	16
10	(United States) Jozy Altidore	Toronto FC	15

=== Assists ===
Rank	Player	Club	Assists
1	(United States) Sacha Kljestan	New York Red Bulls	17
2	(Spain) Víctor Vázquez	Toronto FC	16
3	(United States) Lee Nguyen	New England Revolution	15
4	(Paraguay) Miguel Almirón	Atlanta United FC	14
4	(Colombia) Michael Barrios	FC Dallas	14
4	(Argentina) Federico Higuaín	Columbus Crew SC	14
7	(Argentina) Yamil Asad	Atlanta United FC	13
7	(Slovakia) Albert Rusnák	Real Salt Lake	13
9	(France) Romain Alessandrini	LA Galaxy	12
9	(Uruguay) Nicolás Lodeiro	Seattle Sounders FC	12
9	(Bosnia and Herzegovina) Haris Medunjanin	Philadelphia Union	12

=== Shutouts ===
Rank	Player	Club	Shutouts
1	(Switzerland) Stefan Frei	Seattle Sounders FC	13
2	(United States) Alex Bono	Toronto FC	10
2	(United States) Tim Melia	Sporting Kansas City	10
2	(United States) Luis Robles	New York Red Bulls	10
5	(Jamaica) Andre Blake	Philadelphia Union	9
5	(United States) Jesse González	FC Dallas	9
5	(United States) Zack Steffen	Columbus Crew SC	9
8	(United States) Cody Cropper	New England Revolution	8
8	(United States) Brad Guzan	Atlanta United FC	8
8	(United States) Matt Lampson	Chicago Fire	8
8	(United States) Nick Rimando	Real Salt Lake	8

=== Hat-tricks ===
Player	For	Against	Result	Date
(Venezuela) Josef Martínez	Atlanta United FC	Minnesota United FC	6–1	March 12
(Mexico) Erick Torres	Houston Dynamo	New York Red Bulls	4–1	April 1
(United States) C. J. Sapong	Philadelphia Union	New York Red Bulls	3–0	May 6
(Iraq) Justin Meram	Columbus Crew SC	Montreal Impact	3–2	May 13
(Guinea-Bissau) Gerso	Sporting Kansas City	Seattle Sounders FC	3–0	May 17
(Paraguay) Miguel Almirón	Atlanta United FC	Houston Dynamo	4–1	May 20
(Belgium) Roland Lamah	FC Dallas	Real Salt Lake	6–2	June 3
(Ghana) David Accam	Chicago Fire	Orlando City SC	4–0	June 24
(Spain) David Villa	New York City FC	New York Red Bulls	3–2	August 6
(Sierra Leone) Kei Kamara	New England Revolution	Orlando City SC	4–0	September 2
(Venezuela) Josef Martínez	Atlanta United FC	New England Revolution	7–0	September 13
(Venezuela) Josef Martínez	Atlanta United FC	Orlando City SC	3–3	September 16
(United States) Patrick Mullins^{4}	D.C. United	San Jose Earthquakes	4–0	September 23
(United States) Justin Morrow	Toronto FC	New York Red Bulls	4–2	September 30
(Hungary) Nemanja Nikolić	Chicago Fire	Philadelphia Union	3–2	October 15

^{4} Scored 4 goals

== Awards ==
=== Player of the Month ===
Month	Player	Club	Stats	Ref
March	(Venezuela) Josef Martínez	Atlanta United FC	5G	
April	(United States) Joe Bendik	Orlando City SC	2SO	
May	(Hungary) Nemanja Nikolić	Chicago Fire	6G, 1A	
June	(Spain) David Villa	New York City FC	3G	
July	(Austria) Daniel Royer	New York Red Bulls	6G, 1A	
August	(Argentina) Ignacio Piatti	Montreal Impact	7G, 1A	
September	(Venezuela) Josef Martínez	Atlanta United FC	9G	

=== Player and Team of the week ===
- **Bold** denotes player of the week.

Team of the week
Week	Goalkeeper	Defender	Midfielder	Forward	Bench	Coach
1	(United States) Bendik (ORL)	(Sweden) Sjöberg (COL) (United States) Spector (ORL) (Germany) Jungwirth (SJ) (United States) Lima (SJ)	(United States) Acosta (DAL) (Argentina) **Valeri** (POR) (Panama) Godoy (SJ)	(Ghana) Accam (CHI) (Nigeria) Adi (POR) (Honduras) Quioto (HOU)	(United States) Melia (SKC) (United States) Hedges (DAL) (Brazil) Felipe (NY) (United States) Jones (PHI) (Canada) Davies (VAN) (Mexico) Torres (HOU) (Canada) Larin (ORL)	(Colombia) Wílmer Cabrera (HOU)
2	(United States) Howard (COL)	(United States) Garza (ATL) (Netherlands) Kappelhof (CHI) (United States) Hedges (DAL)	(Argentina) Piatti (MTL) (United States) McCarty (CHI) (Panama) Godoy (SJ) (Paraguay) Almirón (ATL)	(Mexico) Torres (HOU) (Venezuela) **Martínez** (ATL) (Spain) Villa (NYC)	(New Zealand) Gleeson (POR) (United States) Lima (SJ) (Brazil) Alex (HOU) (Brazil) Felipe (NY) (United States) Lletget (LA) (Argentina) Moralez (NYC) (Honduras) Elis (HOU)	(Argentina) Gerardo Martino (ATL)
3	(United States) Steffen (CLB)	(United States) Garza (ATL) (United States) Crognale (CLB) (United States) Spector (ORL)	(Argentina) Valeri (POR) (Canada) Bernier (MTL) (Costa Rica) Guzmán (POR) (United States) Feilhaber (SKC)	(Argentina) **Urruti** (DAL) (Venezuela) Martínez (ATL) (Canada) Larin (ORL)	(United States) Bendik (ORL) (United States) Kallman (MIN) (United States) Burch (COL) (Argentina) Grana (DAL) (United States) Roldan (SEA) (Costa Rica) Wallace (NYC) (United States) Altidore (TOR)	(United States) Gregg Berhalter (CLB)
4	(United States) Van Oekel (RSL)	(United States) Tierney (NE) (United States) Long (NY) (Ghana) Afful (CLB)	(Uruguay) Fagúndez (NE) (United States) Nguyen (NE) (Argentina) Higuaín (CLB) (Brazil) Artur (CLB) (Argentina) Blanco (POR)	(United States) **Agudelo** (NE) (Sierra Leone) Kamara (NE)	(United States) Robles (NY) (United States) Maund (VAN) (Jamaica) Phillips (RSL) (United States) Adams (NY) (United States) Trapp (CLB) (Argentina) Valeri (POR) (Nigeria) Adi (POR)	(United States) Jay Heaps (NE)
5	(United States) Hamid (DC)	(United States) Farfan (POR) (Slovenia) Delamea (NE) (Sweden) Svensson (SEA)	(Iraq) Meram (CLB) (United States) Roldan (SEA) (Argentina) Laba (VAN) (Germany) Schweinsteiger (CHI)	(Uruguay) Techera (VAN) (Mexico) **Torres** (HOU) (United States) Ramirez (MIN)	(United States) Bono (TOR) (United States) Crognale (CLB) (Canada) Edwards (TOR) (Brazil) Artur (CLB) (Colombia) Manotas (HOU) (Canada) Tabla (MTL) (Spain) Villa (NYC)	(England) Adrian Heath (MIN)
6	(United States) González (DAL)	(United States) Boswell (DC) (United States) Opara (SKC) (Slovenia) Delamea (NE)	(France) Alessandrini (LA) (United States) McCarty (CHI) (Honduras) Espinoza (SKC) (Slovakia) **Rusnák** (RSL) (Colombia) Barrios (DAL)	(Armenia) Movsisyan (RSL) (Paraguay) Villalba (ATL)	(United States) Hamid (DC) (United States) Redding (ORL) (United States) Nagbe (POR) (Paraguay) Almirón (ATL) (Argentina) Acosta (DC) (United States) Agudelo (NE)	(Colombia) Óscar Pareja (DAL)
7	(United States) Melia (SKC)	(Costa Rica) Matarrita (NYC) (United States) Spector (ORL) (Norway) Næss (CLB) (United States) Opara (SKC)	(Iraq) Meram (CLB) (Spain) Ilie (SKC) (Canada) Johnson (ORL)	(Colombia) Montero (VAN) (Hungary) **Nikolić** (CHI) (Argentina) Solignac (CHI)	(United States) Bendik (ORL) (United States) Parker (VAN) (United States) McCarty (CHI) (Germany) Schweinsteiger (CHI) (United States) Muyl (NY) (Trinidad and Tobago) Molino (MIN) (Spain) Villa (NYC)	(United States) Mike Petke (RSL)
8	(United States) Bendik (ORL)	(United States) Long (NY) (United States) Toia (ORL) (United States) Zavaleta (TOR)	(Paraguay) Almirón (ATL) (United States) Bradley (TOR) (Ecuador) Gruezo (DAL) (Uruguay) Lodeiro (SEA)	(United States) Dempsey (SEA) (Italy) **Giovinco** (TOR) (Canada) Larin (ORL)	(United States) Shuttleworth (MIN) (Trinidad and Tobago) Jones (SEA) (Canada) Johnson (ORL) (United States) Muyl (NY) (Spain) Vázquez (TOR) (United States) Morris (SEA) (Canada) Jackson-Hamel (MTL)	(United States) Jason Kreis (ORL)
9	(United States) Hamid (DC)	(Canada) Edwards (TOR) (Germany) Jungwirth (SJ) (United States) Zusi (SKC)	(Guinea-Bissau) Gerso (SKC) (United States) Jacobson (VAN) (Argentina) Acosta (DC) (England) **Harrison** (NYC)	(United States) Agudelo (NE) (United States) Altidore (TOR) (Argentina) Urruti (DAL)	(Jamaica) Blake (PHI) (Switzerland) Sutter (ORL) (Cuba) Alonso (SEA) (Venezuela) Herrera (NYC) (United States) Delgado (TOR) (Trinidad and Tobago) Cato (SJ) (Nigeria) Adi (POR)	Not awarded
10	(Jamaica) Blake (PHI)	(United States) Hedges (DAL) (Germany) Jungwirth (SJ) (United States) Morrow (TOR)	(Brazil) Alex (HOU) (Argentina) Higuaín (CLB) (United States) Ibarra (MIN) (Finland) Ring (NYC)	(United States) **Sapong** (PHI) (Costa Rica) Wallace (NYC) (United States) Wondolowski (SJ)	(United States) Shuttleworth (MIN) (Belgium) Ciman (MTL) (Norway) Næss (CLB) (Ghana) Accam (CHI) (Colombia) Manotas (HOU) (Italy) Giovinco (TOR) (Spain) Villa (NYC)	(United States) Greg Vanney (TOR)
11	(United States) Johnson (NYC)	(United States) Onyewu (PHI) (Belgium) Van Damme (LA) (United States) Hairston (COL)	(Uruguay) Fagúndez (NE) (Iraq) **Meram** (CLB) (Brazil) Alex (HOU) (Bosnia and Herzegovina) Medunjanin (PHI) (Ghana) Accam (CHI)	(Canada) Ricketts (TOR) (Hungary) Nikolić (CHI)	(United States) Bono (TOR) (United States) Vincent (CHI) (Germany) Gressel (ATL) (Albania) Gashi (COL) (France) Alessandrini (LA) (Senegal) Badji (COL) (Ghana) Blessing (SKC)	(United States) Greg Vanney (TOR)
12	(United States) Melia (SKC)	(United States) Vincent (CHI) (Honduras) Bernárdez (SJ) (United States) Parker (VAN)	(Uruguay) Fagúndez (NE) (Argentina) Piatti (MTL) (Paraguay) **Almirón** (ATL) (Bosnia and Herzegovina) Medunjanin (PHI) (Guinea-Bissau) Gerso (SKC)	(Spain) Villa (NYC) (Hungary) Nikolić (CHI)	(United States) Hamid (DC) (United States) Gaddis (PHI) (Slovakia) Rusnák (RSL) (Costa Rica) Bolaños (VAN) (Ghana) Accam (CHI) (Mexico) G. dos Santos (LA) (United States) Sapong (PHI)	(Serbia) Veljko Paunovic (CHI)
13	(United States) Hamid (DC)	(United States) Vincent (CHI) (Costa Rica) Calvo (MIN) (United States) Marshall (SEA) (United States) Ford (COL)	(Paraguay) **Almirón** (ATL) (Spain) Vázquez (TOR) (Nigeria) Sunny (RSL) (Portugal) João Pedro (LA) (France) Alessandrini (LA)	(Mexico) G. dos Santos (LA)	(United States) Deric (HOU) (Argentina) González Pírez (ATL) (Jamaica) Lawrence (NY) (Germany) Gressel (ATL) (Brazil) Felipe (NY) (United States) Roldan (SEA) (Ecuador) Plata (RSL)	(United States) Curt Onalfo (LA)
14	(United States) Bendik (ORL)	(United States) Rowe (NE) (United States) Opara (SKC) (Costa Rica) Waston (VAN) (United States) Spector (ORL)	(Belgium) **Lamah** (DAL) (Argentina) Higuaín (CLB) (Cuba) Alonso (SEA) (Argentina) Valeri (POR) (United States) Nguyen (NE)	(Argentina) Urruti (DAL)	(United States) Melia (SKC) (United States) Ford (COL) (Italy) Donadel (MTL) (Uruguay) Fagúndez (NE) (Iraq) Meram (CLB) (Spain) Villa (NYC) (Mexico) Torres (HOU)	(United States) Jay Heaps (NE)
15	(New Zealand) Gleeson (POR)	(Portugal) Meira (CHI) (Kenya) Olum (POR) (United States) Abdul-Salaam (SKC)	(Colombia) Asprilla (POR) (Argentina) Valeri (POR) (Germany) Schweinsteiger (CHI) (Ghana) Accam (CHI)	(Nigeria) **Adi** (POR) (Hungary) Nikolić (CHI) (Guinea-Bissau) Gerso (SKC)	(United States) Melia (SKC) (Lithuania) Vytas (POR) (Argentina) Grana (DAL) (United States) Polster (CHI) (Spain) Ilie (SKC) (Netherlands) de Leeuw (CHI) (Argentina) Urruti (DAL)	(Serbia) Veljko Paunovic (CHI)
16	(United States) Robles (NY)	(United States) Harvey (VAN) (Honduras) Figueroa (DAL) (United States) Opara (SKC)	(Ecuador) Plata (RSL) (France) Alessandrini (LA) (United States) Bradley (TOR) (Paraguay) Almirón (ATL)	(Argentina) Piatti (MTL) (Spain) **Villa** (NYC) (England) Wright-Phillips (NY)	(United States) Shuttleworth (MIN) (Sweden) Saeid (COL (United States) McCarty (CHI) (Argentina) Pérez García (ORL) (Argentina) Verón (NY) (Iraq) Meram (CLB) (Italy) Giovinco (TOR)	(Argentina) Gerardo Martino (ATL)
17	(Jamaica) Blake (PHI)	(United States) Sweat (NYC) (United States) Opara (SKC) (United States) Moor (TOR) (United States) Polster (CHI)	(Ghana) **Accam** (CHI) (Venezuela) Herrera (NYC) (Argentina) Higuaín (CLB) (United States) Bedoya (PHI) (Netherlands) Hoesen (SJ)	(United States) McBean (LA)	(United States) Hamid (DC) (Argentina) González Pírez (ATL) (United States) Roldan (SEA) (Germany) Schweinsteiger (CHI) (The Gambia) Manneh (CLB) (Norway) Kamara (CLB) (Venezuela) Martínez (ATL)	(Serbia) Veljko Paunovic (CHI)
18	(United States) Howard (COL)	(United States) Onyewu (PHI) (United States) Parkhurst (ATL) (United States) Polster (CHI)	(Canada) Johnson (ORL) (Switzerland) Džemaili (MTL) (Finland) Ring (NYC) (United States) Hairston (COL)	(Hungary) **Nikolić** (CHI) (Spain) Villa (NYC) (Senegal) Badji (COL)	(United States) Bingham (SJ) (Uruguay) Aja (ORL) (England) Harrison (NYC) (Republic of Ireland) Doyle (COL) (United States) Wondolowski (SJ) (Argentina) Urruti (DAL)	(Colombia) Óscar Pareja (DAL)
19	(United States) McCarthy (PHI)	(United States) Hollingshead (DAL) (United States) Palmer-Brown (SKC) (United States) Nerwinski (VAN)	(Uruguay) Fagúndez (NE) (Slovakia) Rusnák (RSL) (Colombia) Barrios (DAL) (Venezuela) Savarino (RSL)	(United States) **Dempsey** (SEA) (Venezuela) Martínez (ATL) (Italy) Giovinco (TOR)	(United States) Robles (NY) (Panama) Machado (HOU) (Mexico) Ulloa (DAL) (Colombia) Medranda (SKC) (Belgium) Lamah (DAL) (Colombia) Manotas (HOU) (United States) Altidore (TOR)	(United States) Brian Schmetzer (SEA)
20	(United States) Guzan (ATL)	(United States) Acosta (RSL) (France) Brillant (NYC) (United States) Crognale (CLB)	(Austria) **Royer** (NY) (United States) Kljestan (NY) (United States) Roldan (SEA) (Brazil) Alex (HOU)	(Ecuador) Plata (RSL) (Paraguay) Colmán (DAL) (Spain) Villa (NYC)	(New Zealand) Gleeson (POR) (Netherlands) Leerdam (SEA) (Brazil) Felipe (NY) (Belize) Salazar (MTL) (United States) Bunbury (NE) (Iraq) Meram (CLB) (United States) Ebobisse (POR)	(United States) Jesse Marsch (NY)
21	(United States) Cropper (NE)	(United States) Toia (ORL) (United States) Moor (TOR) (United States) Parker (VAN)	(Austria) Royer (NY) (Argentina) Valeri (POR) (United States) Bradley (TOR) (Trinidad and Tobago) Molino (MIN)	(Norway) O. Kamara (CLB) (Sierra Leone) K. Kamara (NE) (Italy) **Giovinco** (TOR)	(United States) Robles (NY) (Democratic Republic of the Congo) Mavinga (TOR) (Switzerland) Thiesson (MIN) (United States) Rowe (NE) (United States) Kljestan (NY) (Paraguay) Villalba (ATL) (Colombia) Montero (VAN)	(Wales) Carl Robinson (VAN)
22	(United States) McCarthy (PHI)	(United States) Doody (CHI) (Ghana) Opare (DC) (Guam) DeLaGarza (HOU)	(Uruguay) Lodeiro (SEA) (Switzerland) Džemaili (MTL) (Brazil) Ilsinho (PHI) (United States) Thompson (SJ)	(Spain) **Villa** (NYC) (United States) Sapong (PHI) (United States) Dempsey (SEA)	(United States) Johnson (NYC) (Jamaica) Powell (POR) (United States) Marshall (SEA) (United States) Roldan (SEA) (United States) Kljestan (NY) (England) Wright-Phillips (NY) (Costa Rica) Ureña (SJ)	(United States) Jim Curtin (PHI)
23	(United States) Johnson (NYC)	(United States) **Morrow** (TOR) (United States) Marshall (SEA) (Ghana) Abubakar (CLB) (Panama) Murillo (NY)	(Canada) Piette (MTL) (Switzerland) Džemaili (MTL) (United States) Beckerman (COL) (United States) Delgado (TOR) (Honduras) Elis (HOU)	(Spain) Villa (NYC)	(United States) Howard (COL) (Netherlands) Leerdam (SEA) (United States) Hedges (DAL) (Finland) Ring (NYC) (Argentina) Piatti (MTL) (Iraq) Meram (CLB) (Uruguay) Sánchez (HOU)	(United States) Greg Vanney (TOR)
24	(United States) Hamid (DC)	(United States) Besler (SKC) (United States) Marshall (SEA) (United States) Zusi (SKC)	(Argentina) **Piatti** (MTL) (Switzerland) Džemaili (MTL) (United States) Delgado (TOR) (Peru) Reyna (VAN) (Argentina) Valeri (POR)	(United States) Lewis (NYC) (Canada) Jackson-Hamel (MTL)	(United States) Steffen (CLB) (United States) Franklin (DC) (United States) Opara (SKC) (United States) Bradley (TOR) (Georgia (country)) Vako (SJ) (Spain) Villa (NYC) (Colombia) Montero (VAN)	(Canada) Mauro Biello (MTL)
25	(United States) Hamid (DC)	(Costa Rica) Waston (VAN) (Ghana) Mensah (CLB) (United States) Glad (RSL)	(Spain) Vázquez (TOR) (Argentina) Valeri (POR) (United States) Canouse (DC) (Slovakia) Rusnák (RSL)	(Ghana) Danladi (MIN) (Italy) **Giovinco** (TOR) (Mexico) Silva (RSL)	(United States) Bono (TOR) (Lithuania) Vytas (POR) (Ghana) Abu (CLB) (United States) Bradley (TOR) (Ecuador) Plata (RSL) (Mexico) Torres (HOU) (Norway) Kamara (CLB)	(United States) Mike Petke (RSL)
26	(United States) Robles (NY)	(United States) Long (NY) (United States) Steres (LA) (United States) Polster (CHI)	(United States) Kljestan (NY) (United States) Nguyen (NE) (United States) Jones (LA) (Mexico) Ulloa (DAL) (France) Alessandrini (LA)	(Sierra Leone) **Kamara** (NE) (United States) Zardes (LA)	(United States) Cropper (NE) (United States) Romney (LA) (United States) Caldwell (NE) (Brazil) Juninho (CHI) (Colombia) Barrios (DAL) (United States) Muyl (NY) (Argentina) Piatti (MTL)	(United States) Jay Heaps (NE)
27	(United States) Johnson (NYC)	(Iran) Beitashour (TOR) (Argentina) González Pírez (ATL) (United States) Moor (TOR) (United States) Nerwinski (VAN)	(Paraguay) Almirón (ATL) (Mexico) J. dos Santos (LA) (Spain) Vázquez (TOR) (France) Alessandrini (LA)	(United States) Sapong (PHI) (United States) **Altidore** (TOR)	(United States) Melia (SKC) (United States) Romney (LA) (United States) Ford (COL) (United States) Adams (NY) (Germany) Aigner (COL) (Peru) Yotún (ORL) (Peru) Reyna (VAN)	(United States) Greg Vanney (TOR)
28	(Jamaica) Blake (PHI)	(United States) Vincent (CHI) (United States) Glad (RSL) (Costa Rica) Waston (VAN)	(The Gambia) Manneh (CLB) (Slovakia) Rusnák (RSL) (Spain) Vázquez (TOR) (United States) Bradley (TOR) (Paraguay) Almirón (ATL)	(United States) Dwyer (ORL) (Venezuela) '**Martínez** (ATL)	(United States) Johnson (NYC) (United States) Yueill (SJ) (United States) Trapp (CLB) (Argentina) Asad (ATL) (Peru) Reyna (VAN) (Chile) Rubio (SKC) (Canada) Ricketts (TOR)	(United States) Greg Vanney (TOR)
29	(United States) Rimando (RSL)	(United States) Tierney (NE) (United States) Glad (RSL) (United States) Williams (CLB)	(Argentina) Asad (ATL) (Venezuela) Savarino (RSL) (Argentina) Valeri (POR) (United States) Nguyen (NE) (United States) Arriola (DC)	(United States) **Mullins** (DC) (United States) Ramirez (MIN)	(United States) Shuttleworth (MIN) (Argentina) González Pírez (ATL) (Colombia) Chará (POR) (United States) Larentowicz (ATL) (Argentina) Higuaín (CLB) (United States) Pontius (PHI) (Peru) Reyna (VAN)	(United States) Mike Petke (RSL)
30	(Jamaica) Blake (PHI)	(United States) **Morrow** (TOR) (Costa Rica) Waston (VAN) (United States) Parkhurst (ATL) (United States) Adams (NY)	(Iraq) Meram (CLB) (Peru) Yotún (ORL) (United States) Mihailovic (CHI) (Honduras) Elis (HOU)	(Hungary) Nikolić (CHI) (United States) Altidore (TOR)	(United States) González (DAL) (United States) Hedges (DAL) (Honduras) Bernárdez (SJ) (Brazil) Kaká (ORL) (Georgia (country)) Vako (SJ) (Uruguay) Lodeiro (SEA) (Uruguay) Sánchez (HOU)	(United States) Greg Vanney (TOR)
31	(United States) González (DAL)	(Jamaica) Lawrence (NY) (United States) Kallman (MIN) (United States) Hedges (DAL) (United States) Adams (NY)	(Trinidad and Tobago) **Molino** (MIN) (Germany) Aigner (COL) (Spain) Ilie (SKC) (United States) Kljestan (NY) (Argentina) Morales (DAL)	(Ghana) Danladi (MIN)	(United States) Robles (NY) (United States) Opara (SKC) (Brazil) Felipe (NY) (Ecuador) Gruezo (DAL) (Chile) Carmona (ATL) (United States) Martin (MIN) (United States) Gatt (COL)	(United States) Jesse Marsch (NY)
32	(United States) Deric (HOU)	(United States) Adams (NY) (Sweden) Sjöberg (COL) (Jamaica) Powell (POR)	(Argentina) Blanco (POR) (Uruguay) Fagúndez (NE) (United States) Larentowicz (ATL) (Argentina) Valeri (POR) (France) Alessandrini (LA)	(United States) Bruin (SEA) (Hungary) **Nikolić** (CHI)	(United States) Guzan (ATL) (United States) Nerwinski (VAN) (United States) Long (NY) (United States) Trapp (CLB) (United States) Mihailovic (CHI) (Mexico) J. dos Santos (LA) (Peru) Reyna (VAN)	(United States) Caleb Porter (POR)
33	(United States) Knighton (NE)	(Brazil) Leonardo (HOU) (Panama) Torres (SEA) (Panama) Murillo (NY)	(United States) Picault (PHI) (Brazil) Ilsinho (PHI) (Argentina) Díaz (DAL) (Uruguay) Lodeiro (SEA) (Belgium) Lamah (DAL)	(United States) **Wondolowski** (SJ) (Spain) Villa (NYC)	(United States) Steffen (CLB) (Germany) Jungwirth (SJ) (Brazil) Alex (HOU) (Argentina) Higuaín (CLB) (United States) Arriola (DC) (United States) Sapong (PHI) (Netherlands) Hoesen (SJ)	(United States) Chris Leitch (SJ)

=== Goal of the Week ===
Goal of the Week
Week	Player	Club	Ref
1	(Honduras) Romell Quioto	Houston Dynamo	
2	(Paraguay) Miguel Almirón	Atlanta United FC	
3	(Venezuela) Josef Martínez	Atlanta United FC	
4	Not awarded		
5	(Argentina) Diego Valeri	Portland Timbers	
6	(Uruguay) Nicolás Lodeiro	Seattle Sounders FC	
7	(Canada) Anthony Jackson-Hamel	Montreal Impact	
8	(United States) Darlington Nagbe	Portland Timbers	
9	(United States) Andrew Jacobson	Vancouver Whitecaps FC	
10	(Honduras) Alberth Elis	Houston Dynamo	
11	(Albania) Shkëlzen Gashi	Colorado Rapids	
12	(Paraguay) Miguel Almirón	Atlanta United FC	
13	(Paraguay) Héctor Villalba	Atlanta United FC	
14	(Switzerland) Blerim Džemaili	Montreal Impact	
15	Not awarded		
16	(Paraguay) Miguel Almirón	Atlanta United FC	
17	(United States) Ike Opara	Sporting Kansas City	
18	(Switzerland) Blerim Džemaili	Montreal Impact	
19	(United States) Ian Harkes	D.C. United	
20	(Paraguay) Héctor Villalba	Atlanta United FC	
21	(Uruguay) Nicolás Mezquida	Vancouver Whitecaps FC	
22	(Argentina) Diego Valeri	Portland Timbers	
23	(Mexico) Luis Silva	Real Salt Lake	
24	(Peru) Yordy Reyna	Vancouver Whitecaps FC	
25	(United States) Darlington Nagbe	Portland Timbers	
26	Not awarded		
27	(United States) Greg Garza	Atlanta United FC	
28	(Germany) Kevin Kratz	Atlanta United FC	
29	(Paraguay) Héctor Villalba	Atlanta United FC	
30	(Brazil) Kaká	Orlando City SC	
31	Not awarded		
32	(Hungary) Nemanja Nikolić	Chicago Fire	
33	(United States) Paul Arriola	D.C. United	

=== End-of-season awards ===
Award	Winner (club)	Ref
Most Valuable Player	Diego Valeri (Portland Timbers)	
Defender of the Year	Ike Opara (Sporting Kansas City)	
Goalkeeper of the Year	Tim Melia (Sporting Kansas City)	
Coach of the Year	Greg Vanney (Toronto FC)	
Rookie of the Year	Julian Gressel (Atlanta United FC)	
Newcomer of the Year	Miguel Almirón (Atlanta United FC)	
Comeback Player of the Year	Clint Dempsey (Seattle Sounders FC)	
Golden Boot	Nemanja Nikolić (Chicago Fire)	
Fair Play Player Award	DaMarcus Beasley (Houston Dynamo)	
Fair Play Team Award	Seattle Sounders FC	
Humanitarian of the Year	Ryan Hollingshead (FC Dallas)	
Referee of the Year	Allen Chapman	
Assistant Referee of the Year	Corey Parker	
Goal of the Year	Héctor Villalba (Atlanta United FC)	
Save of the Year	Brad Guzan (Atlanta United FC)	

=== MLS Best XI ===
Year	Goalkeeper	Defenders	Midfielders	Forwards
2017	(United States) Tim Melia, Sporting KC	(United States) Justin Morrow, Toronto (United States) Ike Opara, Sporting KC (Costa Rica) Kendall Waston, Vancouver	(Argentina) Diego Valeri, Portland (Paraguay) Miguel Almirón, Atlanta (Spain) Victor Vázquez, Toronto	(Italy) Sebastian Giovinco, Toronto (Venezuela) Josef Martínez, Atlanta (Hungary) Nemanja Nikolić, Chicago (Spain) David Villa, New York City

== Player contracts ==
=== Highest-paid players ===
Rank	Player	Team	Salary (US)
1	(Brazil) Kaká	Orlando City	$7.2m
2	(Italy) Sebastian Giovinco	Toronto FC	$7.1m
3	(United States) Michael Bradley	Toronto FC	$6.5m
4	(Italy) Andrea Pirlo	New York City FC	$5.9m
5	(Spain) David Villa	New York City FC	$5.6m

=== Allocation ranking ===
The allocation ranking is the mechanism used to determine which MLS club has first priority to acquire a player who is in the MLS allocation list. The MLS allocation list contains select U.S. National Team players and players transferred outside of MLS garnering a transfer fee of at least $500,000. The allocations will be ranked in reverse order of finish for the 2016 season, taking playoff performance into account. Two expansion teams will take the top spots.

Once the club uses its allocation ranking to acquire a player, it drops to the bottom of the list. A ranking can be traded provided that part of the compensation received in return is another club's ranking. At all times each club is assigned one ranking. The rankings reset at the end of each MLS season.

Original ranking	Current ranking	Club	Date allocation used (rank on that date)	Player signed	Previous club	Ref
5	1	New England Revolution				
2	2	Minnesota United FC				
8	3	Orlando City SC				
6	4	San Jose Earthquakes				
11	5	Philadelphia Union				
4	6	Houston Dynamo				
13	7	Real Salt Lake				
14	8	Sporting Kansas City				
15	9	LA Galaxy				
16	10	New York City FC				
17	11	New York Red Bulls				
18	12	FC Dallas				
19	13	Montreal Impact				
20	14	Colorado Rapids				
21	15	Toronto FC				
22	16	Seattle Sounders FC				
10	17	Portland Timbers				
1	18	Atlanta United FC	January 26, 2017 (1)	(United States) Brad Guzan	(England) Middlesbrough	
7	19	Vancouver Whitecaps FC	February 15, 2017 (1)	(Colombia) Fredy Montero (loan)	(China) Tianjin TEDA	
12	20	D.C. United	June 20, 2017 (1)	(Jamaica) Deshorn Brown	(United States) Tampa Bay Rowdies	
3	21	Chicago Fire	December 23, 2016 (2)	(Brazil) Juninho (loan)	(Mexico) Tijuana	
3	21	Chicago Fire	August 10, 2017 (6)	(Mexico) Richard Sánchez	(Mexico) UANL	
9	22	Columbus Crew SC	August 10, 2017 (1)	(Hungary) Krisztián Németh	(Qatar) Al-Gharafa	

1. On December 23, 2016, Chicago Fire acquired the number 2 allocation ranking from Minnesota United in exchange for the number 3 allocation ranking, a second-round selection (25th overall) in the 2017 MLS SuperDraft, and general allocation money.
2. On February 15, 2017, Vancouver Whitecaps acquired the number 1 allocation ranking from Minnesota United in exchange for the number 5 allocation ranking, $100,000 in 2018 general allocation money, $125,000 in 2018 targeted allocation money, and a 2017 international roster spot.
3. On June 20, 2017, D.C. United acquired the number 1 allocation ranking from Houston Dynamo in exchange for the number 9 allocation ranking, $100,000 in general allocation money, $75,000 in targeted allocation money, and a 2018 international roster spot.
4. On July 3, 2017, New England Revolution acquired the number 2 allocation ranking and either $175,000 in 2018 targeted allocation money or $100,000 in 2018 general allocation money and $75,000 in 2018 targeted allocation money from San Jose Earthquakes in exchange for the number 5 allocation ranking and $175,000 in general allocation money.
5. On August 10, 2017, Chicago Fire acquired the number 6 allocation ranking from Portland Timbers in exchange for the number 19 allocation ranking and Chicago's natural third-round selection in the 2018 MLS SuperDraft, which will be upgraded to Chicago's natural second-round selection in the 2018 MLS SuperDraft should Richard Sánchez appear in five or more games for the remainder of 2017 season.

== Coaches ==
=== Eastern Conference ===
- Atlanta United FC: Gerardo Martino
- Chicago Fire: Veljko Paunović
- Columbus Crew SC: Gregg Berhalter
- D.C. United: Ben Olsen
- Montreal Impact: Mauro Biello
- New England Revolution: Jay Heaps and Tom Soehn
- New York City FC: Patrick Vieira
- New York Red Bulls: Jesse Marsch
- Orlando City SC: Jason Kreis
- Philadelphia Union: Jim Curtin
- Toronto FC: Greg Vanney

=== Western Conference ===
- Colorado Rapids: Pablo Mastroeni
- FC Dallas: Óscar Pareja
- Houston Dynamo: Wílmer Cabrera
- LA Galaxy: Curt Onalfo and Sigi Schmid
- Minnesota United FC: Adrian Heath
- Portland Timbers: Caleb Porter
- Real Salt Lake: Jeff Cassar and Mike Petke
- San Jose Earthquakes: Dominic Kinnear and Chris Leitch
- Seattle Sounders FC: Brian Schmetzer
- Sporting Kansas City: Peter Vermes
- Vancouver Whitecaps FC: Carl Robinson
