= Brady Scott =

American soccer player (born 1999)

Personal information
- Full name: Brady Canfield Scott
- Date of birth: June 30, 1999 (age 27)
- Place of birth: Petaluma, California, United States
- Height: 6 ft 2 in (1.87 m)
- Position: Goalkeeper

Team information
- Current team: LA Galaxy
- Number: 31

Youth career
- 2009–2012: Sonoma County Alliance
- 2012–2014: Marin FC
- 2014–2016: De Anza Force

Senior career*
Years	Team	Apps	(Gls)
2017–2020	1. FC Köln II	29	(0)
2020	Nashville SC	0	(0)
2020	→ Sacramento Republic (loan)	2	(0)
2021	Austin FC	0	(0)
2021	→ Memphis 901 (loan)	7	(0)
2022–2023	Columbus Crew	0	(0)
2022–2023	→ Columbus Crew 2 (loan)	14	(0)
2024–	LA Galaxy	0	(0)
2024–	→ Ventura County FC (loan)	0	(0)

International career^{‡}
2015–2017	United States U18	2	(0)
2017–2019	United States U20	13	(0)
- * Club domestic league appearances and goals as of March 24, 2024 ‡ National team caps and goals as of September 21, 2020

Brady Canfield Scott (born June 30, 1999) is an American professional soccer player who plays as a goalkeeper for Major League Soccer club LA Galaxy.

== Youth ==
Born in Petaluma, California, Scott began playing recreational soccer at the age of six. He first began playing with the Sonoma County Alliance before joining Marin FC. While at Marin FC, Scott also occasionally played striker.

== Club career ==
Scott then joined De Anza Force before moving to Germany. While with Sonoma County Alliance, Scott had a trial with Dutch Eredivisie side Vitesse and prior to moving to Germany, he was offered a scholarship to play college soccer for the Virginia Cavaliers.

=== 1. FC Köln ===
In July 2017, Scott signed with German Bundesliga club 1. FC Köln. He made his first appearance for the first-team on August 12, 2017, in the DFB-Pokal against Leher TS. He was an unused substitute as Köln won 5–0. Scott then made his competitive debut for the club's reserve side, 1. FC Köln II in the Regionalliga West on August 20, 2017, against Rot-Weiss Essen. He was the starter as his side were defeated 3–0. He failed to make a professional appearance for 1. FC Köln.

=== Nashville SC ===
On August 17, 2020, Scott returned to the United States, signing with Major League Soccer side Nashville SC.

==== Sacramento Republic (loan) ====
Eight days after signing with Nashville SC, Scott was loaned out to USL Championship side Sacramento Republic on August 25, 2020. He made his professional debut for Sacramento Republic on September 20, 2020, starting against Tacoma Defiance in a match that ended 3–3.

=== Austin FC ===
On December 15, 2020, Scott was selected from Nashville SC by Austin FC in the 2020 MLS Expansion Draft. Following the 2021 season, Scott's contract option was declined by Austin.

==== Memphis 901 (loan) ====
On May 14, 2021, Scott joined USL Championship side Memphis 901 on loan for the 2021 season. He made his debut for the club on June 19 in a 1–0 home defeat against OKC Energy.

=== Columbus Crew ===
On January 14, 2022, Scott signed a one-year deal with two option years with the Columbus Crew after they acquired his rights with the fourth pick in Stage 2 of the 2021 MLS Re-Entry Draft.

=== LA Galaxy ===
Following his release from Columbus at the end of the 2023 season, Scott signed with LA Galaxy on March 8, 2024.

== International career ==
Scott has played for various United States youth national teams since 2014. In 2016, he helped the United States under-18 side to the 2016 Vaclav Jezek tournament title, while personally winning the tournament's Golden Glove. Tab Ramos named him to the United States under-20 for the 2019 FIFA U-20 World Cup.

== Career statistics ==
=== Club ===
As of match played May 27, 2023

Appearances and goals by club, season and competition
Club	Season	League			National cup		Continental		Other		Total	
Club	Season	Division	Apps	Goals	Apps	Goals	Apps	Goals	Apps	Goals	Apps	Goals
1. FC Köln II	2017–18	Regionalliga West	5	0	—		—		—		5	0
1. FC Köln II	2018–19	Regionalliga West	13	0	—		—		—		13	0
1. FC Köln II	2019–20	Regionalliga West	11	0	—		—		—		11	0
1. FC Köln II	Total		29	0	—		—		—		29	0
Nashville SC	2020	MLS	0	0	—		—		—		0	0
Sacramento Republic (loan)	2020	USL	2	0	—		—		—		2	0
Austin FC	2021	MLS	0	0	—		—		—		0	0
Memphis 901 (loan)	2021	USL	7	0	—		—		—		7	0
Columbus Crew 2	2022	MLS Next Pro	9	0	—		—		—		9	0
Columbus Crew 2	2023	MLS Next Pro	5	0	—		—		—		5	0
Columbus Crew 2	Total		14	0	—		—		—		14	0
Career total			52	0	0	0	0	0	0	0	52	0

== Honors ==
Columbus Crew

- MLS Cup: 2023

Columbus Crew 2

- MLS Next Pro: 2022

LA Galaxy

- MLS Cup: 2024

United States U20

- CONCACAF U-20 Championship: 2018

Individual

- CONCACAF Under-20 Championship Best XI: 2018
- CONCACAF Under-20 Championship Golden Glove: 2018
