= 2021 Memphis 901 FC season =

Memphis 901 FC
2021 season
- Head coach: Ben Pirmann
- Stadium: AutoZone Park; Memphis, Tennessee
- USL: Conference: 7th
- USL Playoffs: Conference Quarterfinals
- 2021 U.S. Open Cup: Canceled
- Highest home attendance: 5,425 (7/24 v. TUL)
- Lowest home attendance: 3,029 (10/6 v. SKC)
- Average home league attendance: 4,125
- Biggest win: NY 0–3 MEM (9/19)
- Biggest defeat: LOU 3–0 MEM (6/12); OKC 4–1 MEM (8/7)

The 2021 Memphis 901 FC season was the third season for Memphis 901 FC in the USL Championship, the second-tier professional soccer league in the United States and Canada. This article covers the period from November 2, 2020 (the day after the ultimately cancelled 2020 USLC playoffs final) to the end of the 2021 USLC season (tentatively scheduled for November 2021).

== Club ==
=== Roster ===
As of July 10, 2021

No.	Pos.	Player	Nation
1	GK	USA	Kyle Morton (on loan from Houston Dynamo)
2	DF	USA	Mark Segbers
3	DF	USA	Zach Carroll
5	DF	USA	Brecc Evans
7	MF	USA	Mitch Guitar
8	DF	PUR	Raúl González
9	FW	USA	Kyle Murphy
10	MF	USA	Kadeem Dacres
11	FW	BLZ	Michael Salazar
13	GK	USA	John Berner
14	FW	GHA	Francis Atuahene
16	FW	JAM	Rashawn Dally
17	MF	CHN	Tycho Collins
18	MF	GHA	Dominic Oduro
19	MF	TRI	Dre Fortune
20	MF	BEL	Roland Lamah
22	GK	USA	Cody Cropper
23	MF	TRI	Leston Paul
27	MF	USA	Simeon Betapudi
28	GK	USA	Brady Scott (on loan from Austin FC)
30	MF	CIV	Laurent Kissiedou
31	GK	USA	Jake Gelnovatch
33	DF	CAN	Skylar Thomas
36	DF	USA	Andre Reynolds II (on loan from Chicago Fire)
49	FW	USA	Matt Brucker
50	DF	NIR	Niall Logue (on loan from El Paso Locomotive)
88	MF	USA	Max Talley

Signed to a USL academy contract

== Competitions ==
=== USL Championship ===
==== Central Division standings ====
Pos	Team	Pld	W	L	T	GF	GA	GD	Pts	Qualification
1	Louisville City FC	32	18	7	7	61	37	+24	61	Advance to USL Championship Playoffs
2	Birmingham Legion FC	32	18	8	6	51	31	+20	60	Advance to USL Championship Playoffs
3	Memphis 901 FC	32	14	10	8	47	42	+5	50	Advance to USL Championship Playoffs
4	FC Tulsa	32	14	13	5	49	48	+1	47	Advance to USL Championship Playoffs
5	OKC Energy FC	32	8	11	13	30	38	−8	37	
6	Indy Eleven	32	9	15	8	32	47	−15	35	
7	Atlanta United 2	32	8	14	10	47	56	−9	34 (Note: The USL awarded a 3–0 win to Atlanta United 2 after Sporting Kansas City II fielded Jake Davis who was an ineligible player. The original score was 1–0 for Sporting Kansas City II.)	
8	Sporting Kansas City II	32	4	20	8	33	64	−31	20	

Source: USL

==== Match results ====
The 2021 USL Championship season schedule for the club was announced on December 19, 2018.

Win Draw Loss Upcoming fixture

Unless otherwise noted, all times in Central time

May 15 1	Birmingham Legion FC	1–0	Memphis 901 FC	Birmingham, AL
3:30 PM CDT	Asiedu (yellow card) 10'; Rufe (yellow card) 53'; Brett 60'	Report	Carroll (yellow card) 20'; Oduro (yellow card) 57'	Stadium: Legion Field; Attendance: 10,177; Referee: Kyle Johnston

May 23 2	Atlanta United 2	2–2	Memphis 901 FC	Kennesaw, GA
3:30 pm	McFadden 28', 90+3'	Report	Dacres 45'; Kissiedou 73'	Stadium: Fifth Third Bank Stadium; Attendance: 643; Referee: Joshua Encarnación

May 29 3	OKC Energy FC	0–0	Memphis 901 FC	Oklahoma City, OK
7:30 PM CDT	Dunwell (yellow card) 76'; Brown (yellow card) 86'	Report	Paul (yellow card) 8'; Dacres (yellow card) 72' (yellow-red card) 89'; Salazar (yellow card) 90+1'	Stadium: Taft Stadium; Attendance: 2,102; Referee: Matthew Corrigan

June 5 4	Indy Eleven	1–2	Memphis 901 FC	Indianapolis, IN
6:00 PM CDT	Smith (yellow card) 30'; Cochran (yellow card) 43'; Ouimette 90+6'	Report	Salazar 3'; Murphy 35'; Atuahene (yellow card) 44'	Stadium: Michael A. Carroll Stadium; Attendance: 4,999; Referee: Matthew Thompson

June 12 5	Louisville City FC	3–0	Memphis 901 FC	Louisville, KY
7:30 PM ET	Ownby (yellow card) 22', (goal) 70'; Charpie 58'; Lancaster 68' (pen.); McCabe (yellow card) 72'	Report	Segbers (yellow card) 16'; Thomas (yellow card) 50' (yellow-red card) 57'	Stadium: Lynn Family Stadium; Attendance: 12,115; Referee: Greg Dopka

June 16 6	Memphis 901 FC	1–0	Atlanta United 2	Memphis, TN
8:30 PM	Thomas 75'	Report		Stadium: AutoZone Park; Attendance: 5,083; Referee: Jeremy Scheer

June 19 7	Memphis 901 FC	0–1	OKC Energy FC	Memphis, TN
7:30 PM CDT	Oduro (yellow card) 8'; Fortune (yellow card) 60'	Report	Bijev 18'; Ellis-Hayden (yellow card) 30'; Coronado (yellow card) 49' (yellow-red card) 90'; Basuljevic (yellow card) 64'; Ward (yellow card) 77'	Stadium: AutoZone Park; Attendance: 5,265; Referee: Elvis Osmanovic

June 26 8	Memphis 901 FC	2–3	Sporting Kansas City II	Memphis, TN
7:30 PM CDT	Dacres (yellow card) 32', (goal) 64'; Kissiedou (yellow card) 48'; Carroll (yellow card) 53'; Murphy 58'	Report	R. Smith 8'; G. Smith (yellow card) 39'; Mushagalusa (yellow card) 43', (goal) 55'; Čuić (yellow card) 59'; Barbir 72', (yellow card) 87'; Džankić (yellow card) 90+6'	Stadium: AutoZone Park; Attendance: 4,875; Referee: Jonathan Bilinski

July 3 9	Atlanta United 2	2–2	Memphis 901 FC	Kennesaw, GA
7:30 PM	Sebhatu 54'; Matheus 90+4' (pen.)	Report	Murphy 21', 27'	Stadium: Fifth Third Bank Stadium; Attendance: 706; Referee: Joshua Belk

July 10 10	Birmingham Legion FC	0–1	Memphis 901 FC	Birmingham, AL
6:30 PM CDT	James (yellow card) 62'	Report	Salazar (yellow card) 27'; Oduro (yellow card) 45+2'; Murphy 53'	Stadium: BBVA Field; Referee: Joshua Encarnación

July 17 11	Indy Eleven	1–1	Memphis 901 FC	Indianapolis, IN
6:00 PM CDT	Moon 47'	Report	Salazar 51'; Dally (yellow card) 85'	Stadium: Michael A. Carroll Stadium; Attendance: 6,999; Referee: Luis Arroyo

July 24 12	Memphis 901 FC	1–0	FC Tulsa	Memphis, TN
7:30 PM CDT	Murphy 45+4'; Carroll (yellow card) 64'; Dally (yellow card) 90+5'	Report	Marlon (yellow card) 39'	Stadium: AutoZone Park; Attendance: 5,425; Referee: Adam Kilpatrick

August 1 13	Sporting Kansas City II	1–2	Memphis 901 FC	Kansas City, KS
4:00 PM CDT	Harris 25' (pen.), (yellow card) 45'; Rad (yellow card) 90+2'	Report	Murphy 12'; Salazar 48'	Stadium: Children's Mercy Park; Referee: Mathew Corrigan

August 7 14	OKC Energy FC	4–1	Memphis 901 FC	Oklahoma City, OK
7:30 PM CDT	Daniels 40', 45'; Brown (yellow card) 54'; Osmond (yellow card) 69'; Bijev 73'; Dunwell (yellow card) 90+2'; Stephenson 90+4'	Report	Logue (yellow card) 13'; Kissiedou (red card) 24'; Murphy 49'; Paul (yellow card) 61'; Morton (yellow card) 85'	Stadium: Taft Stadium; Attendance: 2,183; Referee: Kevin Broadley

August 10 15	Memphis 901 FC	1–1	Colorado Springs Switchbacks FC	Memphis, TN
7:30 PM CDT	Scott (yellow card) 34'; Murphy (yellow card) 44', (goal) 84' (pen.); Salazar (yellow card) 47'; Atuahene (yellow card) 59'; Logue (yellow card) 81'	Report	Barry 35' (pen.); Beckford (yellow card) 53'; Ockford (yellow card) 56' (yellow-red card) 83'; Argueta (yellow card) 70'	Stadium: AutoZone Park; Attendance: 3,512; Referee: John Matto

August 14 16	Memphis 901 FC	1–1	Birmingham Legion FC	Memphis, TN
7:30 PM CDT	Murphy 58'	Report	Flemmings 37'	Stadium: AutoZone Park; Attendance: 4,864; Referee: Gabriele Giusti

August 25 17	FC Tulsa	2–1	Memphis 901 FC	Tulsa, OK
7:00 PM CDT	Jadama (yellow card) 8'; Moloto (yellow card) 75'; Marlon 80', 90+2'	Report	Dacres (yellow card) 16'; Reynolds (yellow card) 39'; Murphy 87'	Stadium: ONEOK Field; Attendance: 2,302; Referee: Jervis Atagana

August 29 18	Sporting Kansas City II	0–0	Memphis 901 FC	Kansas City, KS
4:00 PM CDT	Čuić (yellow card) 25'	Report	Murphy (yellow card) 54'; Oduro (yellow card) 64'; Winn (yellow card) 75'; Segbers (yellow card) 86'	Stadium: Children's Mercy Park; Referee: Jeremy Scheer

September 1 19	Memphis 901 FC	0–1	OKC Energy FC	Memphis, TN
7:00 PM CDT	Fortune (yellow card) 8'; Logue (yellow card) 70'	Report	Batista (yellow card) 19'; Ellis-Hayden (red card) 24'; Bijev 47'; Cochran (yellow card) 90+1'	Stadium: AutoZone Park; Attendance: 3,816; Referee: Gabriele Giusti

September 4 20	Memphis 901 FC	3–2	Birmingham Legion FC	Memphis, TN
7:00 PM CDT	Kissiedou 45+2'; Lamah 90+3'; Gonzalez 90+6'	Report	Kasim 42'; Vancaeyezeele (yellow card) 43'; Dean (yellow card) 70'; A. Crognale 79'; E. Crognale (yellow card) 83'; Lopez (yellow card) 87'	Stadium: AutoZone Park; Attendance: 3,162; Referee: Luis Guardia

September 11 21	Memphis 901 FC	0–2	Miami FC	Memphis, TN
7:00 PM CDT	Oduro (yellow card) 29'; Fortune (yellow card) 57'	Report	da Silva (yellow card) 28'; François 32', 50'; Craig (yellow card) 68'; Chapman-Page (yellow card) 74'	Stadium: AutoZone Park; Attendance: 3,865; Referee: Benjamin Meyer

September 19 22	New York Red Bulls II	0–3	Memphis 901 FC	Montclair, NJ
12:00 p.m. EDT	Edelman (yellow card) 28' (yellow-red card) 39'; Tombul (yellow card) 67'; Egbo (yellow card) 70'	Report	Murphy 21' (pen.), 79'; Thomas 26'; Segbers (yellow card) 33'; Paul (yellow card) 90+4'	Stadium: MSU Soccer Park; Attendance: 506; Referee: Sergii Demianchuk

September 22 23	Memphis 901 FC	1–0	Indy Eleven	Memphis, TN
7:00 PM CDT	Murphy 31'; Paul (yellow card) 56'; Reynolds (yellow card) 75'; Cropper (yellow card) 90'; Kissiedou (yellow card) 90+6'	Report	Moon (yellow card) 28'	Stadium: AutoZone Park; Attendance: 3,716; Referee: Adam Kilpatrick

September 25 24	Memphis 901 FC	1–1	Louisville City FC	Memphis, TN
7:00 PM CDT	Murphy 3'; Oduro (yellow card) 55'; Fortune (yellow card) 84'; Segbers (yellow card) 88'	Report	Lancaster 8'; Ownby (yellow card) 23'; DelPiccolo (yellow card) 55'; Hoppenot (yellow card) 64'; Greig (yellow card) 87'	Stadium: AutoZone Park; Attendance: 3,616; Referee: Calin Radosav

October 2 25	FC Tulsa	0–3	Memphis 901 FC	Tulsa, OK
7:00 PM CDT	Rivas (penalty missed) 2'; Marlon (yellow card) 70'	Report	Bourgeois 17' (o.g.); Logue (yellow card) 33'; Kissiedou (yellow card) 25', (goal) 35', 45+3'	Stadium: ONEOK Field; Attendance: 3,405; Referee: Matthew Corrigan

October 6 26	Memphis 901 FC	3–1	Sporting Kansas City II	Memphis, TN
7:00 PM CDT	Murphy 20', (yellow card) 60', (goal) 74' (pen.); Paul (yellow card) 25'; Oduro (yellow card) 89'; Lamah 90+5'	Report	Mushagalusa 17'; K. Rad (yellow card) 39'; Davis (yellow card) 69'; McIntosh (yellow card) 73'; G. Smith (yellow card) 86'; Čuić (yellow card) 87'	Stadium: AutoZone Park; Attendance: 3,029; Referee: Danielle Chesky

October 10 27	San Antonio FC	4–2	Memphis 901 FC	San Antonio, TX
7:30 PM CDT	Deplagne (yellow card) 11'; Gallegos 30'; Nathan (yellow card) 44', (goal) 66', 86'; Khmiri (yellow card) 45+1' (yellow-red card) 90+3'; Taintor (yellow card) 51'; Cardone (yellow card) 82'	Report	Salazar (yellow card) 13', (goal) 22'; Thomas (yellow card) 73'; Dacres 90+5' (pen.)	Stadium: Toyota Field; Attendance: 5,005; Referee: Kevin Broadley

October 13 28	Memphis 901 FC	2–1	Louisville City FC	Memphis, TN
7:00 PM CDT	Oduro (yellow card) 25'; Salazar 45'; Kissiedou (yellow card) 57'; Fortune (yellow card) 61'; Segbers 78'	Report	DelPiccolo 12'; Charpie (yellow card) 30'; J Wynder (yellow card) 35'	Stadium: AutoZone Park; Attendance: 3,034; Referee: Jonathan Bilinski

October 16 29	Memphis 901 FC	4–2	Atlanta United 2	Memphis, TN
6:00 PM	Segbers (yellow card) 43'; Lamah 50'; Dacres 53'; Murphy 60'; Winn 69'	Report	Macky Diop (yellow card) 37', (goal) 44' (pen.); Fortune 64'; Washington (yellow card) 75'	Stadium: AutoZone Park; Attendance: 4,482; Referee: Gerald Flores

October 23 30	Louisville City FC	3–1	Memphis 901 FC	Louisville, KY
6:30 PM CDT	Lancaster 21', 45+3', 65' (pen.); Ownby (yellow card) 25'	Report	Dacres (yellow card) 36'; Salazar 41'; Kissiedou (yellow card) 70'	Stadium: Lynn Family Stadium; Attendance: 10,900; Referee: Joshua Encarnacion

October 27 31	Memphis 901 FC	3–2	FC Tulsa	Memphis, TN
7:00 PM CDT	Fortune 24', (yellow card) 39'; Segbers 33'; Murphy 75', (yellow card) 85'; Paul (yellow card) 88'; Oduro (yellow card) 90+2'	Report	Marlon 8' (pen.); Logue 74' (o.g.)	Stadium: AutoZone Park; Attendance: 3,443; Referee: Elton García

October 30 32	Memphis 901 FC	3–0	Indy Eleven	Memphis, TN
6:00 PM CDT	Fortune (yellow card) 7', (goal) 56'; Lamah 12'; Murphy 31'; Reynolds (yellow card) 66'; Carroll (yellow card) 81'	Report	Vassell (yellow card) 25'; Moon (yellow card) 80'; Partida (yellow card) 85'	Stadium: AutoZone Park; Attendance: 4,015; Referee: Matthew Franz

=== U.S. Open Cup ===
On March 29, 2021, the U.S. Soccer Federation announced a truncated format for the 2021 U.S. Open Cup, with 16 clubs participating, entering at the same time in a Round of 16. The format included just four teams from the USL Championship, the four semi-finalists from the 2020 playoffs (El Paso, Louisville, Phoenix, and Tampa). Due to the fact that Memphis failed to qualify for the 2020 USLC playoffs, this eliminated the club from the 2021 U.S. Open Cup.
