= Cody Cropper =

American soccer player (born 1993)

Personal information
- Full name: Cody Cropper
- Date of birth: February 16, 1993 (age 33)
- Place of birth: Atlanta, Georgia, United States
- Height: 1.93 m (6 ft 4 in)
- Position: Goalkeeper

Youth career
- 2006–2008: Minnesota Thunder
- 2008–2009: Reading Rage
- 2010–2012: Ipswich Town

Senior career*
Years	Team	Apps	(Gls)
2012–2015	Southampton	0	(0)
2015–2016	Milton Keynes Dons	9	(0)
2016–2019	New England Revolution	36	(0)
2019	→ Hartford Athletic (loan)	9	(0)
2020	Houston Dynamo	0	(0)
2021	FC Cincinnati	1	(0)
2021	→ Memphis 901 (loan)	14	(0)
2022	Vancouver Whitecaps FC	15	(0)
2022	Whitecaps FC 2	1	(0)
2023	Orange County SC	9	(0)

International career^{‡}
2010–2013	United States U20	21	(0)
2014–2016	United States U23	7	(0)
Medal record
Representing United States
Runner-up	CONCACAF U-20 Championship	2013
- * Club domestic league appearances and goals as of July 3, 2023 ‡ National team caps and goals as of October 26, 2016

Cody Cropper (born February 16, 1993) is an American former professional soccer player who played as a goalkeeper.

== Youth soccer ==
Born in Atlanta, Cropper moved to Maple Grove, Minnesota when he was 10. He played with the Minnesota Thunder Academy and the Reading Rage, as well spending time with the US U-17 residency program at the IMG Soccer Academy in Bradenton, Florida.

== Club career ==
Cropper had several trials in England, including with Wolverhampton Wanderers and Leicester City, before joining the Ipswich Town academy in 2010. He made the bench for the Ipswich first team, but suffered a torn meniscus. He failed to receive a new contract offer from Ipswich and was released after the 2011–12 season.

=== Southampton ===
Cropper joined Southampton in August 2012. Cropper served as a backup keeper for the Saints; making the first team bench, but playing for the U-21 and U-23 teams and never making a first team appearance. His time with Southampton included multiple injuries. After three years at the south coast club, Cropper was released in May 2015.

=== Milton Keynes Dons ===
On June 30, 2015, Cropper joined newly promoted Championship side Milton Keynes Dons. He made his debut for MK Dons on August 11, 2015, in an EFL Cup first round win against Leyton Orient. In September Cropper underwent knee surgery that kept him sidelined for over a month. On April 16, 2016, Cropper was sent off for a foul on Preston North End's striker Eoin Doyle. He returned from the suspension on April 23 and suffered a season ending shoulder injury in a 4–1 loss to Brentford. Cropper was released after the 2015–16 season when the club decided not to take up the one-year option in Cropper's contract after being relegated to League One.

=== New England Revolution ===
On August 18, 2016, Cropper signed with Major League Soccer club New England Revolution. He made his Revolution debut on October 23, getting a clean sheet in a 3–0 win over the Montreal Impact in the final game of the season.

The Revolution's first choice goalkeeper, Bobby Shuttleworth, was traded to Minnesota United ahead of the 2017 season, giving Cropper a shot at the starting job. Cropper impressed head coach Jay Heaps and won the starting job coming out of preseason. He started 28 of the 34 league games during the year, keeping eight clean sheets. However the Revolution finished in 7th place in the Eastern Conference, missing out on the playoffs by five points.

Cropper did not play during the 2018 season. He missed the start of the season due to a concussion. When he had returned to action, head coach Brad Friedel kept Matt Turner as the starter with Brad Knighton as the second choice keeper.

Cropper made his first appearance of 2019 on March 30, a 2–1 win over Minnesota United in the 5th game of the season. He would start the next 7 games for the Revs before Friedel decided to bench him. Bruce Arena came in as the new head coach, but Cropper failed to return to the lineup.

==== Hartford Athletic (loan) ====
On August 17, 2019, Cropper was loaned to USL Championship side Hartford Athletic for the remainder of the season. He made his debut for Hartford on August 24, a 3–2 win over Atlanta United 2. Cropper started the final nine games of the season for Hartford, keeping one clean sheet.

On November 21, 2019, New England declined their contract option on Cropper.

=== Houston Dynamo ===
On January 24, 2020, Cropper signed with MLS club Houston Dynamo. He did not make any appearances for the Dynamo in 2020, serving as the backup for Marko Marić. His contract option was declined by Houston following their 2020 season.

=== FC Cincinnati ===
On December 30, 2020, it was announced that Cropper had signed for FC Cincinnati ahead of their 2021 season. On August 27, 2021, Cropper was loaned to USL Championship side Memphis 901. He was waived by Cincinnati on September 15, 2021.

=== Vancouver Whitecaps ===
On March 15, 2022, Cropper was signed as a free agent by the Vancouver Whitecaps FC. He was signed for the 2022 season with a club option for 2023. During the 2022 Canadian Championship Cropper appeared in all four matches, notching one clean sheet while only conceding three goals. Cropper came up huge in the tournament's final as his goalkeeping led to a 5–3 shootout victory over Toronto FC to award Vancouver their first Canadian Championship since 2015.

=== Orange County SC ===
On March 14, 2023, Cropper signed with USL Championship side Orange County SC. On July 4, 2023, Cropper retired from playing professionally and become an assistant coach at University of St. Thomas.

== International career ==
Cropper represented the United States at the 2011 and 2013 editions of the CONCACAF U-20 Championship, the latter of which the US finished as runners-up. He was also the first-choice goalkeeper for the United States at the 2013 FIFA U-20 World Cup and the 2015 Toulon Tournament, the latter of which the US finished in third place.

Cropper has appeared for the US up to U-23 level, including at the 2016 CONCACAF-CONMEBOL Olympic playoff. He received his first United States senior team call-up for an August 14, 2013, friendly against Bosnia and Herzegovina. He was an unrostered player at the USMNT training camp at Stanford University before the 2014 FIFA World Cup, and later received a senior call-up for a friendly against the Czech Republic on September 3, 2014. He was also called up to the United States senior squad for a friendly against Germany on June 10, 2015.

== Honours ==
=== Club ===
Vancouver Whitecaps

- Canadian Championship: 2022

== Career statistics ==
As of 6 October 2023

Appearances and goals by club, season and competition
Club	Season	League			National cup (Note: Includes the FA Cup and US Open Cup)		League cup (Note: Includes the EFL Cup, MLS Cup Playoffs, and USL Championship Playoffs)		Continental		Total	
Club	Season	Division	Apps	Goals	Apps	Goals	Apps	Goals	Apps	Goals	Apps	Goals
Southampton	2012–13	Premier League	0	0	0	0	0	0	—		0	0
Southampton	2013–14	Premier League	0	0	0	0	0	0	—		0	0
Southampton	2014–15	Premier League	0	0	0	0	0	0	—		0	0
Southampton	Southampton Total		0	0	0	0	0	0	0	0	0	0
Milton Keynes Dons	2015–16	EFL Championship	9	0	1	0	2	0	—		12	0
New England Revolution	2016	MLS	1	0	0	0	—		—		1	0
New England Revolution	2017	MLS	28	0	0	0	—		—		28	0
New England Revolution	2018	MLS	0	0	0	0	—		—		0	0
New England Revolution	2019	MLS	7	0	0	0	0	0	—		7	0
New England Revolution	Revolution Total		36	0	0	0	0	0	0	0	36	0
Hartford Athletic (loan)	2019	USL Championship	9	0	0	0	—		—		9	0
Houston Dynamo	2020	MLS	0	0	0	0	—		—		0	0
Cincinnati	2021	MLS	1	0	0	0	—		—		1	0
Memphis 901	2021	USL Championship	15	0	0	0	—		—		15	0
Vancouver Whitecaps	2022	MLS	15	0	4 (Note: Appearances in Canadian Championship)	0	—		—		19	0
Vancouver Whitecaps II	2022	MLS Next Pro	1	0	0	0	—		—		1	0
Orange County	2023	USL Championship	9	0	2	0	—		—		11	0
Career total			95	0	7	0	2	0	0	0	104	0

== Personal life ==
Cropper has an English father. He was born in Atlanta and moved to Maple Grove, Minnesota at the age of 10.
