= Michael Salazar =

American–Belizean footballer (born 1992)

Personal information
- Full name: Michael Dwane Salazar Jr.
- Date of birth: 15 November 1992 (age 33)
- Place of birth: New York City, United States
- Height: 1.80 m (5 ft 11 in)
- Position: Forward

Team information
- Current team: Los Angeles Force

College career
Years	Team	Apps	(Gls)
2011–2012	CBU Lancers	39	(17)
2013–2015	UC Riverside Highlanders	36	(12)

Senior career*
Years	Team	Apps	(Gls)
2014	OC Pateadores Blues	3	(2)
2015	PSA Elite		
2016–2018	Montreal Impact	34	(5)
2016	→ FC Montreal (loan)	3	(0)
2017	→ Ottawa Fury (loan)	4	(2)
2018	→ Ottawa Fury (loan)	4	(0)
2019	Rio Grande Valley FC	12	(8)
2019–2020	Houston Dynamo	8	(0)
2019	→ Rio Grande Valley FC (loan)	12	(2)
2021	Memphis 901	32	(6)
2022	LA Galaxy II	27	(5)
2023	Miami FC	32	(2)
2024–	Los Angeles Force	3	(0)

International career^{‡}
- Belize U17
2013–	Belize	23	(3)
- * Club domestic league appearances and goals as of 18 October 2023 ‡ National team caps and goals as of 24 March 2024

Michael Dwane Salazar Jr. (born 15 November 1992) is an American–Belizean professional footballer who plays as a forward for National Independent Soccer Association club Los Angeles Force. Born in the United States, he plays for the Belize national team.

== Club career ==
=== College and amateur ===
Salazar began his collegiate career at California Baptist University. In his freshman year in 2011, Salazar made a total of 20 appearances, starting seven of them, and finished tied for the team lead with 11 goals and was the team leader with 28 points. His strong performances saw him named the Pacific West Conference freshman of the year and named to the All-PacWest second team. He also led the Lancers to a Pacific West Conference championship and helped the Lancers finish with the most wins in program history. To top if off, Salazar helped Cal Baptist win the National Christian College Athletic Association (NCCAA) national championship, with Salazar scoring twice in the final. In his sophomore year, Salazar made 19 appearances and finished with six goals and led the team with six assists. He was once again named to the All PacWest Second Team. The Lancers their second straight national NCCAA title with Salazar picking up 2 assists in the final. After two seasons at California Baptist, Salazar transferred to UC Riverside on 10 June 2013.

In Salazar's first match with the Highlanders, he scored 3 goals and picked up 1 assist. He would lead the team with 6 goals and was named to the All Big-West First Team. In 2015, Salazar scored 6 goals, this time good enough for the second most on the team, and was once again named to the All Big-West First Team.

Salazar also played with amateur club Orange County SC U-23 in 2014 and PSA Elite in 2014 and 2015. Salazar scored 3 goals in 4 appearances for PSA Elite during the 2015 US Open Cup, earning him the 2015 Lower Division Player of Tournament award.

=== Montreal Impact ===
Salazar was selected in the second round (24th overall) of the 2016 MLS SuperDraft by CF Montréal. He attracted favorable attention when he scored a goal for the Impact during a pre-season friendly match against D.C. United. He signed his first MLS contract on March 1, 2016. Salazar started the season by making 2 starts with Montreal's USL affiliate FC Montreal. Salazar made his MLS and Impact debut on 7 May 2016 when he came on as a substitute in a 4–4 draw with the Columbus Crew On 1 June he scored his first professional goal in a 4–2 loss to Toronto FC in the first leg of the Canadian Championship semifinals. Salazar made his first MLS start on 2 July and scored his first and second career MLS goals to help give the Impact a 3–2 win over the New England Revolution.

On 2 May 2017 Salazar was loaned to the Impact's USL affiliate Ottawa Fury FC after only making 2 substitute appearances in the Impact's first 9 matches. He made his Fury debut on 6 May in a 0–0 draw with the Tampa Bay Rowdies and scored his first goal for the Fury on 20 May in a 4–3 win over New York Red Bulls II. Salazar's strong performance's with the Fury saw him return to the impact after 4 appearances with Ottawa. He picked up his first goal of the season for the Impact on 5 July in a 1–3 loss to the Houston Dynamo FC. Salazar would also manage to put the ball in the net in Montreal's next two games, scoring and picking up an assist against the Philadelphia Union on 19 July in a 2–1 win and scoring in a 1–2 loss to FC Dallas on 22 July.

On 28 February 2018 Salazar was loaned to Ottawa for a second spell. In the Fury's first game of the 2018 season, Salazar picked up an assist in a 1–4 defeat to the Charlotte Independence. After making 4 appearances for Ottawa, Salazar suffered a knee injury that forced him to miss the rest of the season.

Salazar was released by Montreal at the end of their 2018 season.

In early 2019, Salazar went on trial with USL Championship club Birmingham Legion FC and scored a goal for them in a 3–1 victory in a friendly against the Chattanooga Red Wolves on 13 February 2019 However, he was not offered a contract with the Legion.

=== Rio Grande Valley FC ===
On 14 March 2019, Rio Grande Valley FC Toros announced that Salazar has signed with the club for the 2019 USL Championship season. He made his Toros debut on 16 March, coming on as a sub in a 2–0 loss to Fresno FC. He scored his first goal for RGVFC on 13 April in a 2–1 win over Oklahoma City Energy FC. On 24 April Salazar came on as a sub and scored 3 goals to help give the Toros a 4–4 draw with LA Galaxy II. He was named to the USL Championship Team of the Week in honor of his performance against LA Galaxy II. Salazar scored again against LA Galaxy II on 18 May to help RGVFC secure a 2–2 draw. In the Toros next match, Salazar would score a brace against San Antonio FC to help give RGVFC a 3–1 win. He was named to his second USL Championship Team of the Week as a result. Salazar scored against Real Monarchs on 8 June in a Toros 3–5 loss. His 8 goals set a RGVFC single season record for league goals

=== Houston Dynamo ===
On 10 June 2019, Salazar signed with RGVFC's parent MLS club the Houston Dynamo. He made his Dynamo debut on 11 June, coming on as a substitute in a 3–2 win over Austin Bold in the US Open Cup. Salazar made his first league appearance for the Dynamo on 22 June, coming on as a sub in a 4–0 loss to the Portland Timbers. On 29 June, he made his first start for Houston in a 2–1 defeat to the New England Revolution. After failing to score in 10 appearances with the Dynamo, Salazar was sent back to RGVFC on loan, where he would score 2 goals in 12 appearances.

For 2020, Salazar remained with the Dynamo, but only made one appearance all year, a 13-minute substitute appearance against Sporting Kansas City in a 4–0 loss.

His contract option was declined by Houston following their 2020 season.

=== Memphis 901 ===
On 12 April 2021, Salazar signed with USL Championship side Memphis 901 FC. He made his debut for Memphis on 15 May, playing the full 90 minutes in a 1–0 loss to the Birmingham Legion. Salazar scored his first goal for Memphis on 5 June in a 2–1 win over Indy Eleven. He ended the regular season with 32 appearances, 6 goals, and 2 assists, helping Memphis finish 3rd in the Central Division and qualify for the playoffs. In Memphis's playoff game, Salazar came on as a substitute in the first half in a 3–1 loss to the Charlotte Independence.

=== LA Galaxy II ===
On 3 March 2022, it was announced that Salazar had signed with USL Championship side Ventura County FC ahead of their final USL season before the club moved to the MLS Next Pro.

=== Miami FC ===
On 3 January 2023, Salazar signed with USL Championship side Miami FC for their 2023 season.

== International career ==
On 11 June 2013, Salazar made his international debut for Belize in a 0–0 draw against Guatemala. Two weeks later, he was named to their 23-man roster for the 2013 CONCACAF Gold Cup. Salazar would appear in all 3 of Belize's games at the 2013 Gold Cup and all 5 of their games at the 2017 Copa Centroamericana. Salazar scored his first goal for Belize in a 4–2 win over Grenada in a friendly on 22 March 2018. He scored his second international goal on 17 November 2019 in a 3–2 loss to Grenada in a CONCACAF National League match.

== Personal life ==
Salazar was born on 15 November 1992, in New York City, but moved along with his parents to their native Belize shortly after birth. He grew up in Cayo, Belize. After living in Belize for 18 years, Salazar and his family moved to Moreno Valley, California where he attended Canyon Springs High School for his senior year.

== Career statistics ==
As of 15 November 2021

=== Club ===
Club	Season	League			Cup (Note: Appearances in Canadian Championship, and US Open Cup)		Playoffs		Continental		Total	
Club	Season	Division	Apps	Goals	Apps	Goals	Apps	Goals	Apps	Goals	Apps	Goals
Montreal Impact	2016	MLS	17	2	2	1	0	0	—		19	3
Montreal Impact	2017	MLS	17	3	0	0	—		—		17	3
Montreal Impact	2018	MLS	0	0	0	0	—		—		0	10
Montreal Impact	Total		34	5	2	1	0	0	0	0	37	6
FC Montreal (loan)	2016	USL	3	0	—		—		—		3	0
Ottawa Fury (loan)	2017	USL	4	2	0	0	—		—		4	2
Ottawa Fury (loan)	2018	USL	4	0	0	0	—		—		4	0
Ottawa Fury (loan)	Total		8	2	0	0	0	0	0	0	8	2
Rio Grande Valley FC	2019	USLC	12	8	—		—		—		12	8
Houston Dynamo	2019	MLS	7	0	2	0	—		1 (Note: Appearances in the Leagues Cup)	0	10	0
Houston Dynamo	2020	MLS	1	0	0	0	—		—		1	0
Houston Dynamo	Total		8	0	2	0	0	0	1	0	11	0
Rio Grande Valley FC (loan)	2019	USLC	12	2	—		—		—		12	2
Rio Grande Valley FC (loan)	Total		24	0	0	0	0	0	0	0	24	10
Memphis 901	2021	USLC	32	6	—		1	0	—		33	6
Career total			109	23	4	1	1	0	1	0	115	24

=== International ===
As of match played 24 March 2024

Appearances and goals by national team and year
National team	Year	Apps	Goals
Belize	2013	4	0
Belize	2014	0	0
Belize	2015	0	0
Belize	2016	1	0
Belize	2017	5	0
Belize	2018	1	1
Belize	2019	4	1
Belize	2020	0	0
Belize	2021	0	0
Belize	2022	2	0
Belize	2023	4	0
Belize	2024	2	1
Total		23	3

As of match played 24 March 2024
Scores and results list Belize's goal tally first.

List of international goals scored by Michael Salazar
No.	Date	Venue	Cap	Opponent	Score	Result	Competition
1	22 March 2018	Isidoro Beaton Stadium, Belmopan, Belize	11	Grenada	1–1	4–2	Friendly
2	17 November 2019	Kirani James Athletic Stadium, St. George's, Grenada	15	Grenada	2–1	2–3	2019–20 CONCACAF Nations League B
3	24 March 2024	FFB Stadium, Belmopan, Belize	23	Puerto Rico	1–0	3–0	Friendly
