= 2017 San Antonio FC season =

San Antonio FC
2017 season
- Owner: Spurs Sports & Entertainment
- Head coach: Darren Powell
- Stadium: Toyota Field
- USL: Conference: 2nd Overall: 3rd
- USL Playoffs: Conference Semifinals
- U.S. Open Cup: Third Round
- Top goalscorer: League: Billy Forbes (10 goals); All: Billy Forbes (10 goals)
- Highest home attendance: 8,131 vs OKC Energy FC (July 14, 2017)
- Lowest home attendance: 6,037 vs Whitecaps FC 2 (August 23, 2017)
- Average home league attendance: League: 7,138; Playoffs: 7,026
- Biggest win: 4–0 (April 15 vs. Reno 1868 FC); 4–0 (April 28 at Portland Timbers 2)
- Biggest defeat: 2–5 (September 17 at Swope Park Rangers)

The 2017 San Antonio FC season was the club's second season of existence. Including the San Antonio Thunder of the original NASL and the former San Antonio Scorpions of the modern NASL, this was the 8th season of professional soccer in San Antonio. The club played in the United Soccer League, a provisionally sanctioned second-tier league of the United States soccer league system, and also participated in the U.S. Open Cup. San Antonio was designated as the USL affiliate of New York City FC for the 2017 season.

== Club ==
=== Coaching staff ===
Position	Staff
Head coach	(England) Darren Powell
Assistant coach	(Scotland) Andy Thomson
Assistant coach/SAFC Pro Academy director	(Wales) Nick Evans
Goalkeeping director	(Mexico) Juan Lamadrid
Head Athletic Trainer	(United States) Yaseen Khan
Team Physician	(United States) Eliot Young, M.D.
Equipment Manager/Team Coordinator	(United States) Rashad Moore

Source: San Antonio FC

=== Other information ===
Owner	(United States) Spurs Sports & Entertainment
Chairman	(United States) Julianna Hawn Holt
Managing Director	(United States) Tim Holt
Ground (capacity and dimensions)	Toyota Field (8,200 / 110x70 yards)
Training Ground	S.T.A.R. Soccer Complex

Source: San Antonio FC

== Squad information ==
=== First-team squad ===
As of September 5, 2017.

Squad No.	Name	Nationality	Position(s)	Date of birth (age)
Goalkeepers
0	Matt Cardone	(United States)	GK	June 18, 1993 (age 33)
1	Lee Johnston	(United States)	GK	November 17, 1992 (age 33)
24	Diego Restrepo	(United States)	GK	February 25, 1988 (age 38)
Defenders
2	Andrew Kendall-Moullin	(United States)	DF	November 30, 1994 (age 31)
4	Cyprian Hedrick	(Cameroon)	DF	October 6, 1989 (age 36)
13	Ben Newnam	(United States)	DF	April 18, 1991 (age 35)
15	Stepthen McCarthy	(United States)	DF	July 21, 1988 (age 38)
20	Greg Cochrane	(United States)	DF	November 1, 1990 (age 35)
25	Ryan Roushandel	(United States)	DF	November 11, 1985 (age 40)
Midfielders
3	Sebastien Ibeagha	(United States)	MF	January 21, 1992 (age 34)
6	Pecka	(Brazil)	MF	May 2, 1989 (age 37)
7	Billy Forbes	(Turks and Caicos Islands)	MF	December 13, 1990 (age 35)
8	Michael Reed	(United States)	MF	October 28, 1987 (age 38)
11	Victor Araujo	(Brazil)	MF	June 25, 1991 (age 35)
16	Rafael Castillo	(Colombia)	MF	June 6, 1980 (age 46)
19	Kris Tyrpak	(United States)	MF	March 19, 1992 (age 34)
21	Mark O'Ojong	(Cameroon)	MF	April 25, 1997 (age 29)
23	Devin Vega	(United States)	MF	December 11, 1998 (age 27)
26	Maxi Rodríguez	(United States)	MF	August 9, 1995 (age 31)
27	Connor Presley	(United States)	MF	July 4, 1998 (age 28)
91	Owayne Gordon	(Jamaica)	MF	October 8, 1991 (age 34)
Forwards
10	César Elizondo	(Costa Rica)	FW	February 10, 1988 (age 38)
12	Mike Seth	(United States)	FW	September 20, 1987 (age 38)
99	Éver Guzmán	(Mexico)	FW	March 15, 1988 (age 38)

== Player movement ==
=== In ===
Pos	Player	Previous club	Fee	Date	Source
DF	(Cameroon) Cyprian Hedrick	(United States) OKC Energy FC	Undisclosed	November 29, 2016	
MF	(United States) Kris Tyrpak	(United States) Swope Park Rangers	Undisclosed	December 6, 2016	
FW	(United States) Akwafei Ajeakwa	(United States) Orange County Blues	Undisclosed	December 13, 2016	
DF	(United States) Ben Newnam	(United States) Louisville City FC	Undisclosed	December 23, 2016	
MF	(Turks and Caicos Islands) Billy Forbes	(United States) Rayo OKC	Undisclosed	January 10, 2017	
MF	(Brazil) Pecka	(United States) Rayo OKC	Undisclosed	January 18, 2017	
DF	(Jamaica) Kevyn McFarlane	(United States) Rochester Rhinos	Undisclosed	January 25, 2017	
MF	(United States) Devin Vega	(United States) FC Dallas Academy	Undisclosed	January 26, 2017	
MF	(United States) Sebastien Ibeagha	(United States) Houston Dynamo	Undisclosed	February 3, 2017	
MF	(Colombia) Juan Niño	(Colombia) Barranquilla F.C.	Undisclosed	February 16, 2017	
MF	(United States) Maxi Rodriguez	(United States) UNC Charlotte	Undisclosed	February 22, 2017	
FW	(United States) Aly Hassan	(United States) North Carolina FC	Undisclosed	March 9, 2017	
GK	(United States) Diego Restrepo	(United States) Tampa Bay Rowdies	Undisclosed	March 9, 2017	
MF	(Cameroon) Mark O'Ojong	(United States) Seattle Sounders FC 2	Undisclosed	April 28, 2017	
FW	(Mexico) Éver Guzmán	(Mexico) Correcaminos UAT	Undisclosed	August 4, 2017	
FW	(United States) Mike Seth	(United States) Phoenix Rising FC	Undisclosed	August 10, 2017	
MF	(United States) Connor Presley	(United States) Lonestar SC Academy	Undisclosed	August 10, 2017	
DF	(United States) Andrew Kendall-Moullin	(United States) Southern Illinois University Edwardsville	Undisclosed	September 5, 2017	

=== Out ===
Pos	Player	Transferred To	Fee	Date	Source
MF	(United States) Diego Garcia	(United States) Lonestar SC Academy U-17/18	Undisclosed	October 15, 2016	
FW	(Jamaica) Jason Johnson	(United States) Phoenix Rising FC	Undisclosed	November 15, 2016	
GK	(United States) Josh Ford	Unattached	Retired	December 13, 2016	
DF	(United States) Fejiro Okiomah	Unattached	Retired	January 25, 2017	
DF	(United States) Austin Dunker	(Australia) Logan Lightning FC	Undisclosed	January 26, 2017	
FW	(United States) Franck Tayou	Unattached	Mutual Termination	February 23, 2017	
FW	(Puerto Rico) Manolo Sanchez	(United States) Harrisburg City Islanders	Undisclosed	March 21, 2017	
MF	(United States) Carlos Alvarez	(United States) Los Angeles FC	Undisclosed	March 23, 2017	
FW	(England) Taylor Morgan	(England) Whitehawk F.C.	Undisclosed	March 31, 2017	
DF	(Republic of Ireland) Biko Bradnock-Brennan	(Norway) Os TF	Undisclosed	April 6, 2017	
DF	(Jamaica) Kevyn McFarlane	Unattached	Mutual Termination	April 28, 2017	
MF	(Colombia) Juan Niño	Unattached	Mutual Termination	July 1, 2017	
FW	(United States) Aly Hassan	Unattached	Released	August 10, 2017	
FW	(Mexico) Miguel Salazar	Unattached	Released	August 17, 2017	
FW	(United States) Akwafei Ajeakwa	Unattached	Mutual Termination	September 5, 2017	
FW	(United States) Shawn Chin	Unattached	Mutual Termination	September 5, 2017	

=== Loan in ===
Pos	Player	Loaned From	Start	End	Source
MF	(Haiti) Zachary Herivaux	(United States) New England Revolution	April 21, 2017	May 13, 2017	
MF	(Haiti) Zachary Herivaux	(United States) New England Revolution	June 3, 2017	June 14, 2017	
MF	(Jamaica) Owayne Gordon	(Jamaica) Montego Bay United	August 17, 2017	End of season	

=== Loan out ===
Pos	Player	Loaned To	Start	End	Source

== Pre-season ==
The pre-season match against Minnesota United FC was announced by MNUFC on January 20, 2017. Remaining pre-season matches were announced on January 24, 2017, by SAFC.

February 11, 2017	San Antonio FC	2–1	University of the Incarnate Word	San Antonio, Texas
1:00 p.m. CDT	Roushandel; Vega (pen.)	Report	Peters	Stadium: Toyota Field; Attendance: Closed-door

February 18, 2017	San Antonio FC	0–0	St. Edward's University	San Antonio, Texas
1:00 p.m. CDT		Report		Stadium: Toyota Field; Attendance: Closed-door
Note: 60-minute match.

February 18, 2017	San Antonio FC	0–1	St. Edward's University	San Antonio, Texas
3:00 p.m. CDT		Report	50'	Stadium: Toyota Field; Attendance: Closed-door
Note: 60-minute match.

February 26, 2017	Minnesota United FC	0–2	San Antonio FC	Melbourne, Florida
10:30 AM CDT		Report	Hedrick 39'; Vega 90'	Stadium: Titan Soccer Complex

March 4, 2017	Orlando City B	0–0	San Antonio FC	Melbourne, Florida
12:00 PM CDT		Report	Hedrick (yellow card) 58'	Stadium: Titan Soccer Complex

March 11, 2017	San Antonio FC	1–1	Tulsa Roughnecks FC	San Antonio, Texas
1:00 PM CDT	Forbes 24'; Pecka (yellow card) 46'; Castillo (red card) 50'	Report	Caffa (yellow card) 13'; Ayala (yellow card) 19'; Ayala 30'; Mata (yellow card) 45'	Stadium: Toyota Field; Attendance: 3,400; Referee: Luis Guardia

March 19, 2017	FC Dallas	2–1	San Antonio FC	Frisco, Texas
10:00 AM CDT	Barrios 8'; Akindele 30'	Report	Elizondo (yellow card) 24'; Forbes (yellow card) 61'; Hassan 65'	Stadium: Toyota Soccer Center AdvoCare Field 1

== Competitions ==
=== Overall ===
Position in the Western Conference

Competition	Started round	Final position / round	First match	Last match
United Soccer League	—	2nd	March 26, 2017	October 14, 2017
USL Playoffs	Conference Quarterfinals	Conference Semifinals	October 21, 2017	October 28, 2017
U.S. Open Cup	Second round	Third Round	May 17, 2017	May 31, 2017

Updated to match played October 30, 2017
Source: Competitions

=== Overview ===
Competition	Record							
Competition	G	W	D	L	GF	GA	GD	Win %
United Soccer League	32	17	11	4	45	24	+21	53.13
USL Playoffs	2	1	1	0	3	2	+1	50.00
U.S. Open Cup	2	1	1	0	2	1	+1	50.00
Total	36	19	13	4	50	27	+23	52.78

Updated to match played October 30, 2017
Source: Competitions

=== United Soccer League ===
==== League table ====
Pos	Team	Pld	W	D	L	GF	GA	GD	Pts	Qualification
1	Real Monarchs (X)	32	20	7	5	59	31	+28	67	Conference Playoffs
2	San Antonio FC	32	17	11	4	45	24	+21	62	Conference Playoffs
3	Reno 1868 FC	32	17	8	7	75	39	+36	59	Conference Playoffs
4	Swope Park Rangers	32	17	7	8	55	37	+18	58	Conference Playoffs
5	Phoenix Rising FC	32	17	7	8	50	37	+13	58	Conference Playoffs

Source: 2017 USL standings
Rules for classification: 1) total wins; 2) total goal differential; 3) total goals scored; 4) points earned against top four Conference finishers; 5) disciplinary points; 6) coin toss or drawing of lots
(X) Regular Season League Champion

==== Results summary ====
Overall								Home						Away					
Pld	W	D	L	GF	GA	GD	Pts	W	D	L	GF	GA	GD	W	D	L	GF	GA	GD
32	17	11	4	45	24	+21	62	8	7	1	24	10	+14	9	4	3	21	14	+7

Last updated: October 16, 2017.

==== Results by matchday ====
Position in the Western Conference

Round	1	2	3	4	5	6	7	8	9	10	11	12	13	14	15	16	17	18	19	20	21	22	23	24	25	26	27	28	29	30	31	32
Stadium	A	H	H	H	A	A	A	H	H	H	A	H	A	H	A	A	H	H	A	H	A	A	H	A	A	A	A	H	A	H	H	H
Result	W	W	D	W	W	W	W	W	D	W	W	D	D	W	L	D	D	D	W	D	L	D	W	W	D	W	L	L	W	D	W	W
Position	7	2	3	1	1	1	1	1	1	1	1	2	2	2	2	2	2	3	2	2	2	3	2	2	3	2	2	3	4	3	2	2

Updated to match(es) played on October 16, 2017. Source:
A = Away; H = Home; W = Win; D = Draw; L = Loss; P = Postponed

==== Matches ====
The first match of 2017 and the home opener were announced on January 27, 2017. The remaining schedule was released on January 31, 2017. Home team is listed first, left to right.

Win Draw Loss Postponed

Kickoff times are in CDT (UTC−05) unless shown otherwise

March 26, 2017 1	Rio Grande Valley FC Toros	0–1	San Antonio FC	Edinburg, Texas
6:00 p.m. CDT	Garcia (yellow card) 62'	Report	Forbes 15'; Rodriguez (yellow card) 90'	Stadium: H-E-B Park; Attendance: 6,030; Referee: Luis Guardia

April 1, 2017 2	San Antonio FC	3–0	LA Galaxy II	San Antonio, Texas
7:30 p.m. CDT	Castillo 12'; McCarthy (yellow card) 18'; Reed 29'; Forbes 77'; Elizondo (yellow card) 90+3'	Report	Diallo (yellow card) 13'; Villarreal (red card) 86'	Stadium: Toyota Field; Attendance: 8,081; Referee: Marco Vega

April 7, 2017 3	San Antonio FC	1–1	Colorado Springs Switchbacks FC	San Antonio, Texas
8:00 p.m. CDT	Ibeagha (yellow card) 66'; McCarthy (yellow card) 69'; Tyrpak 79'; Newnam (yellow card) 83'	Report	King 12'; Suggs (yellow card) 45+2'; Kim (yellow card) 57'; Frater (yellow card) 72'; Phillips (yellow card) 84'; Eboussi (yellow card) 89'	Stadium: Toyota Field; Attendance: 6,217; Referee: Pedro Trejo Jr

April 15, 2017 4	San Antonio FC	4–0	Reno 1868 FC	San Antonio, Texas
7:30 p.m. CDT	Forbes 34'; Elizondo 67', 79'; Pecka (yellow card) 69'; Castillo 90+2' (pen.)	Report		Stadium: Toyota Field; Attendance: 6,403; Referee: Tyler Mitcham

April 22, 2017 5	Whitecaps FC 2	1–2	San Antonio FC	Vancouver, British Columbia
5:00 p.m. CDT	Bustos 45' de Wit (yellow card) 90+1'	Report	Hassan 22'; Ibeagha (yellow card) 27'; Forbes 46'; McCarthy (yellow card) 90+7'	Stadium: Thunderbird Stadium; Attendance: 403; Referee: Juan Márquez

April 25, 2017 6	Seattle Sounders FC 2	2–3	San Antonio FC	Tukwila, Washington
9:30 p.m. CDT	Mathers (yellow card) 52'; Rogers 55'; Ulysse (yellow card) 72'; Mathers 75' (pen.); Parra (yellow card) 81'; Gonzalez (red card) 90+2'	Report	Ajeakwa 13'; Herivaux (yellow card) 16'; Forbes 24'; Cochrane (yellow card) 28'; Ibeagha (yellow card) 61'; Vega 69'; Elizondo (yellow card) 90'	Stadium: Starfire Sports Complex; Attendance: 972; Referee: Edvin Jurisevic

April 28, 2017 7	Portland Timbers 2	0–4	San Antonio FC	Portland, Oregon
9:30 p.m. CDT	Batista (yellow card) 62'; Farfan (yellow card) 74'	Report	Forbes 20'; Elizondo 34', 90+3'; Newnam (yellow card) 45+2'; Herivaux 90+1'	Stadium: Providence Park; Attendance: 2,511; Referee: Ekaterina Koroleva

May 6, 2017 8	San Antonio FC	1–0	Sacramento Republic FC	San Antonio, Texas
7:30 p.m. CDT	Castillo 64' (pen.); Ibeagha (yellow card) 76'	Report	Ochoa (yellow card) 39'; Hall (yellow card) 74'; Barrera (yellow card) 75'; Kiffe (yellow card) 90+6'	Stadium: Toyota Field; Attendance: 7,234; Referee: Dule Djurasevic

May 13, 2017 9	San Antonio FC	0–0	Seattle Sounders FC 2	San Antonio, Texas
7:30 p.m. CDT	Reed (yellow card) 30'; Newnam (yellow card) 45+1'; Castillo (yellow card) 81'; Araujo (yellow card) 90+2'	Report	Ulysse (yellow card) 37'; Saari (yellow card) 87'; Ele (yellow card) 90+2'	Stadium: Toyota Field; Attendance: 8,005; Referee: Rosendo Mendoza

May 20, 2017 10	San Antonio FC	1–0	Phoenix Rising FC	San Antonio, Texas
7:30 p.m. CDT	Ajeakwa 12'; McCarthy (yellow card) 90+1'	Report	Wakasa (yellow card) 39'; Bravo (yellow card) 73'	Stadium: Toyota Field; Attendance: 7,414; Referee: Juan Guzman

May 26, 2017 11	Swope Park Rangers	0–1	San Antonio FC	Kansas City, Missouri
7:30 p.m. CDT	Musa (yellow card) 24'	Report	O'Ojong 53'; Forbes (yellow card) 61'; O'Ojong (yellow card) 79'; Tyrpak (yellow card) 90+3'	Stadium: Swope Soccer Village; Attendance: 921; Referee: Jose Lara

June 3, 2017 12	San Antonio FC	0–0	Swope Park Rangers	San Antonio, Texas
7:30 p.m. CDT	Cochrane (red card) 82'	Report	Doyle (yellow card) 27'; Musa (yellow card) 70'	Stadium: Toyota Field; Attendance: 6,307; Referee: Elton Garcia

June 10, 2017 13	OKC Energy FC	0–0	San Antonio FC	Oklahoma City, Oklahoma
7:30 p.m. CDT		Report	O'Ojong (yellow card) 45+3'; Newnam (yellow card) 56'; McCarthy (yellow card) 70'	Stadium: Taft Stadium; Attendance: 4,918; Referee: Greg Dopka

June 17, 2017 14	San Antonio FC	3–1	Tulsa Roughnecks FC	San Antonio, Texas
7:30 p.m. CDT	Tyrpak 4', 33', (yellow card) 36'; Vega 76'	Report	Rivas 27'; Caffa (yellow card) 54'	Stadium: Toyota Field; Attendance: 7,376; Referee: Patrick Muana

June 24, 2017 15	Colorado Springs Switchbacks FC	1–0	San Antonio FC	Colorado Springs, Colorado
8:00 p.m. CDT	Suggs (yellow card) 41'; McFarlane 45+3'; Frater (yellow card) 56'	Report	Restrepo (red card) 77'	Stadium: Weidner Field; Attendance: 4,429; Referee: Malik Badawi

July 1, 2017 16	Sacramento Republic FC	1–1	San Antonio FC	Sacramento, California
10:00 p.m. CDT	Klimenta 19'	Report	Ajeakwa 31', (yellow card) 39'	Stadium: Papa Murphy's Park; Attendance: 11,569; Referee: Farhad Dadkho

July 14, 2017 17	San Antonio FC	1–1	OKC Energy FC	San Antonio, Texas
8:00 p.m. CDT	Forbes 52'	Report	Fink (yellow card) 23'; González 90+4'	Stadium: Toyota Field; Attendance: 8,131; Referee: Caleb Mendez

July 22, 2017 18	San Antonio FC	2–2	Real Monarchs	San Antonio, Texas
7:30 p.m. CDT	Vega 27'; McCarthy (yellow card) 52'; Tyrpak 68'	Report	Hoffman 32' (pen.); Gallagher (yellow card) 45+1'; Lachowecki (yellow card) 46', (goal) 86'	Stadium: Toyota Field; Attendance: 7,642; Referee: Rosendo Mendoza

July 29, 2017 19	Phoenix Rising FC	0–1	San Antonio FC	Scottsdale, Arizona
8:00 p.m. CDT	Johnson (yellow card) 49'; Ramage (yellow card) 50'; Riggi (yellow card) 75'; Wright-Phillips (yellow card) 76'; Drogba (yellow card) 90+4'	Report	O'Ojong (yellow card) 27'; Castillo (yellow card) 37'; Tyrpak (yellow card) 75'; Elizondo (yellow card) 79'; Castillo 85' (pen.); McCarthy (yellow card) 90+3'	Stadium: Phoenix Rising FC Soccer Complex; Attendance: 5,463; Referee: Mark Allatin

August 5, 2017 20	San Antonio FC	1–1	Orange County SC	San Antonio, Texas
7:30 PM CDT	Tyrpak 2'; Castillo (yellow card) 27'; Ibeagha (yellow card) 56'; Restrepo (yellow card) 77'	Report	Baxendale (yellow card) 50' van Ewijk 90+5' (pen.)	Stadium: Toyota Field; Attendance: 6,725; Referee: Robi Hullner
Note: 50th USL league match

August 12, 2017 21	Reno 1868 FC	2–0	San Antonio FC	Reno, Nevada
9:30 PM CDT	Fernandes 25'; Brown 70'	Report	Ibeagha (yellow card) 23'; Newnam (yellow card) 59'; Tyrpak (yellow card) 60'; Rodriguez (yellow card) 67'; Elizondo (yellow card) 79'; O'Ojong (yellow card) 80'; Ajeakwa (yellow card) 90+1'	Stadium: Greater Nevada Field; Attendance: 5,847; Referee: Malik Badawi

August 19, 2017 22	OKC Energy FC	0–0	San Antonio FC	Oklahoma City, Oklahoma
7:30 p.m. CDT	Fink (yellow card) 54'	Report		Stadium: Taft Stadium; Attendance: 4,578; Referee: Jorge Ramirez

August 23, 2017 23	San Antonio FC	1–0	Whitecaps FC 2	San Antonio, Texas
7:30 p.m. CDT	Tyrpak 14'; Restrepo (yellow card) 90'	Report		Stadium: Toyota Field; Attendance: 6,037; Referee: Tyler Mitcham

August 26, 2017	San Antonio FC	PP	Portland Timbers 2	San Antonio, Texas
7:30 p.m. CDT				Stadium: Toyota Field
Note: Postponed due to inclement weather caused by Hurricane Harvey

September 2, 2017 24	Real Monarchs	1–2	San Antonio FC	Sandy, Utah
8:00 p.m. CDT	Curinga (yellow card) 8'; Saucedo 50', (yellow card) 68'	Report	Elizondo (yellow card) 50'; Tyrpak (yellow card) 58'; Ibeagha (yellow card) 86'; Peay 88' (o.g.); Pecka (yellow card) 90'; McCarthy 90+3'	Stadium: Rio Tinto Stadium; Attendance: 3,376; Referee: Ramy Touchan

September 9, 2017 25	LA Galaxy II	1–1	San Antonio FC	Carson, California
9:30 p.m. CDT	Turner (yellow card) 37'; Zubak (yellow card) 42'; McBean (yellow card) 45'; Engola 51'; Estrada (yellow card) 90+3'	Report	Hedrick (yellow card) 35'; Reed 88'	Stadium: StubHub Center; Attendance: 1,275; Referee: Malik Badawi

September 13, 2017 26	Orange County SC	0–1	San Antonio FC	Irvine, California
9:30 p.m. CDT	Sorto (yellow card) 54'	Report	Newnam 55'; Elizondo (yellow card) 61'; Tyrpak (yellow card) 68'; McCarthy (yellow card) 85'	Stadium: Champions Soccer Stadium; Attendance: 1,857; Referee: Alejandro Mariscal
Note: SAFC clinched first playoff berth in club history

September 17, 2017 27	Swope Park Rangers	5–2	San Antonio FC	Kansas City, Missouri
4:00 p.m. CDT	Selbol 11' (pen.), 62'; Hernandez 46'; Belmar 65'; Gonzalez (yellow card) 72'; Rugova 80'	Report	Newnam (yellow card) 13'; Gordon 20'; Pecka (yellow card) 45'; Forbes 85'	Stadium: Children's Mercy Victory Field; Attendance: 1,114; Referee: Farhad Dadkho

September 23, 2017 28	San Antonio FC	0–1	Rio Grande Valley FC Toros	San Antonio, Texas
7:30 p.m. CDT	Newnam (red card) 20'; McCarthy (yellow card) 42'; Pecka (yellow card) 45+6'	Report	Escalante 17', (yellow card) 22'; Rodriguez (yellow card) 45+8'; Bird (yellow card) 84'; Holland (yellow card) 89'	Stadium: Toyota Field; Attendance: 8,125; Referee: Michael Radchuck

September 30, 2017 29	Tulsa Roughnecks FC	0–2	San Antonio FC	Tulsa, Oklahoma
7:00 p.m. CDT	Svantesson (yellow card) 28'; Gee (yellow card) 43'; Bourgeois (yellow card) 45+2'	Report	Pecka (yellow card) 43'; Restrepo (yellow card) 45+2'; Reed (yellow card) 58'; O'Ojong 70'; Forbes (yellow card) 81', (goal) 88'	Stadium: ONEOK Field; Attendance: 3,246; Referee: Ismir Pekmic

October 7, 2017 30	San Antonio FC	1–1	Tampa Bay Rowdies	San Antonio, Texas
7:30 p.m. CDT	Pecka (yellow card) 50'; Gordon (yellow card) 55'; O'Ojong (yellow card) 84'; Guzmán (yellow card) 88', (goal) 88'	Report	Hristov 69'; Restrepo (yellow card) 72'	Stadium: Toyota Field; Attendance: 7,043; Referee: Victor Rivas

October 11, 2017 31	San Antonio FC	2–1	Portland Timbers 2	San Antonio, Texas
7:30 p.m. CDT	Guzmán 16'; Roushandel 71'	Report	Tuiloma 35'	Stadium: Toyota Field; Attendance: 6,096; Referee: Patrick Muana
Note: Rescheduled from August 26 due to inclement weather caused by Hurricane Harvey

October 14, 2017 32	San Antonio FC	3–1	Rio Grande Valley FC Toros	San Antonio, Texas
7:30 p.m. CDT	Forbes 29'; Guzmán 34', 59'	Report	Bird 47', (yellow card) 76'; Wharton (yellow card) 54'; Escalante (red card) 73'; Murphy (yellow card) 89'	Stadium: Toyota Field; Attendance: 7,604; Referee: Elton Garcia

=== USL Playoffs ===
On September 13, 2017, San Antonio clinched a spot in the 2017 USL Playoffs.

October 21, 2017 Conference Quarterfinals	San Antonio FC	2–1	Tulsa Roughnecks FC	San Antonio, Texas
7:30 p.m. CDT	McCarthy (yellow card) 55'; Elizondo 61'; Guzmán 90+4' (pen.)	Report	Gee 23'; Ayala (yellow card) 53'; Rivas (yellow card) 90+2'; Levin (yellow card) 90+2'	Stadium: Toyota Field; Attendance: 7,019; Referee: Timothy Ford

October 28, 2017 Conference Semifinals	San Antonio FC	1–1 (a.e.t.) (1–4 p)	OKC Energy FC	San Antonio, Texas
7:30 p.m. CDT	Elizondo 7' (yellow card) 97'; Gordon (yellow card) 51'; Castillo (yellow card) 112'	Report	R. Dixon (yellow card) 72'; Wojcik 85'	Stadium: Toyota Field; Attendance: 7,032; Referee: Guido Gonzales Jr.
	Penalties
	Guzmán (penalty missed); Castillo (penalty scored); Reed (penalty missed)		(penalty scored) Angulo; (penalty scored) Brown; (penalty scored) Hyland; (penalty scored) Wallace

=== Lamar Hunt U.S. Open Cup ===
May 17, 2017 Second round	Houston Dutch Lions (Texas)	1–2	(Texas) San Antonio FC	Conroe, Texas
7:00 p.m. CDT	Scholman 62'; Broekmans (yellow card) 70'	Report	Araujo 17'; Hassan 41'	Stadium: Dutch Lions FC Soccer Facility; Attendance: 250; Referee: Patrick Muana

May 31, 2017 Third Round	Tulsa Roughnecks FC (Oklahoma)	0–0 (a.e.t.) (7–6 p)	(Texas) San Antonio FC	Tulsa, Oklahoma
7:00 p.m. CDT	Bourgeois (yellow card) 46'; Fernandez (yellow card) 81'	Report	Chin (yellow card) 32'; Newnam (yellow card) 93'; Vega (yellow card) 120+1'	Stadium: Hurricane Soccer & Track Stadium; Attendance: 5,532; Referee: Elvis Mahmutovic
	Penalties
	Calistri (penalty scored); Caffa (penalty scored); Kondrakhin (penalty missed); Svantesson (penalty scored); Cerda (penalty scored); Jadama (penalty scored); Fernandez (penalty scored); Ugarte (penalty scored)		(penalty scored) Castillo; (penalty scored) Araujo; (penalty scored) Vega; (penalty missed) O'Ojong; (penalty scored) Hassan; (penalty scored) Ajeakwa; (penalty scored) Newnam; (penalty missed) Restrepo

=== Exhibition ===
On May 16, 2017, it was announced that San Antonio would play an exhibition match against Santos Laguna.

July 8, 2017 Friendly	San Antonio FC (United States)	1–1 (3–4 p)	(Mexico) Santos Laguna	San Antonio, Texas
7:30 p.m. CDT	Forbes 18'; Ibeagha (yellow card) 44'; Castillo (yellow card) 59'; McCarthy (yellow card) 65'; Hedrick (yellow card) 74'; Ajeakwa (yellow card) 79'	Report	Armenteros 68'; Angulo (yellow card) 90'	Stadium: Toyota Field; Attendance: 8,007; Referee: Rosendo Mendoza
	Penalties
	Forbes (penalty missed); Roushandel (penalty scored); Vega (penalty scored); Araujo (penalty missed); Cochrane (penalty scored); Hedrick (penalty missed)		(penalty missed) Abella; (penalty scored) Dávila; (penalty scored) Antuna; (penalty missed) Djaniny; (penalty scored) Angulo; (penalty scored) de Buen
Note: First-ever international friendly

== Statistics ==
=== Appearances ===
Discipline includes league, playoffs, and Open Cup play.

No.	Pos.	Name	League		Playoffs		U.S. Open Cup		Total		Discipline	
No.	Pos.	Name	Apps	Goals	Apps	Goals	Apps	Goals	Apps	Goals	Yellow card	Red card
0	GK	(United States) Matt Cardone	5	0	0	0	0	0	5	0	0	0
1	GK	(United States) Lee Johnston	1 (1)	0	0	0	1	0	2 (1)	0	0	0
2	DF	(United States) Andrew Kendall-Moullin	1	0	0	0	1	0	2	0	0	0
3	MF	(United States) Sebastien Ibeagha	30	0	2	0	1	0	33	0	7	0
4	DF	(Cameroon) Cyprian Hedrick	13 (1)	0	0	0	1 (1)	0	14 (2)	0	1	0
6	MF	(Brazil) Pecka	21 (3)	0	2	0	0 (1)	0	23 (4)	0	6	0
7	MF	(Turks and Caicos Islands) Billy Forbes	30 (1)	10	2	0	1	0	33 (1)	10	2	0
8	MF	(United States) Michael Reed	25	2	0 (2)	0	0	0	25 (2)	2	2	0
10	FW	(Costa Rica) César Elizondo	13 (8)	4	2	2	0	0	15 (8)	6	7	0
11	MF	(Brazil) Victor Araujo	1 (6)	0	0	0	1 (1)	1	2 (7)	1	1	0
12	FW	(United States) Mike Seth	2 (4)	0	0	0	0	0	2 (4)	0	0	0
13	DF	(United States) Ben Newnam	23 (1)	1	0	0	2	0	25 (1)	1	7	1
15	DF	(United States) Stephen McCarthy	22 (3)	1	2	0	0	0	25 (3)	1	10	0
16	MF	(Colombia) Rafael Castillo	16 (1)	4	0 (1)	0	2	0	18 (2)	4	4	0
19	MF	(United States) Kris Tyrpak	24 (2)	6	0 (1)	0	0	0	24 (3)	6	6	0
20	DF	(United States) Greg Cochrane	31	0	2	0	1	0	34	0	1	1
21	MF	(Cameroon) Mark O'Ojong	9 (4)	2	2	0	2	0	13 (4)	2	5	0
23	MF	(United States) Devin Vega	6 (8)	3	0	0	0 (2)	0	6 (10)	3	1	0
24	GK	(United States) Diego Restrepo	26 (1)	0	2	0	1	0	29 (1)	0	3	1
25	DF	(United States) Ryan Roushandel	8 (4)	1	2	0	1	0	11 (4)	1	0	0
26	MF	(United States) Maxi Rodriguez	6 (10)	0	0	0	2	0	8 (10)	0	2	0
27	MF	(United States) Connor Presley	1 (5)	0	0	0	0	0	1 (5)	0	0	0
91	MF	(Jamaica) Owayne Gordon	10 (1)	1	2	0	0	0	12 (1)	1	2	0
99	FW	(Mexico) Éver Guzmán	6 (3)	4	2	1	0	0	9 (2)	5	1	0
Players who left the club
	FW	(United States) Akwafei Ajeakwa	12 (3)	3	0	0	0 (1)	0	12 (4)	3	2	0
	FW	(United States) Shawn Chin	3 (11)	0	0	0	2	0	5 (11)	0	1	0
	FW	(United States) Aly Hassan	3 (4)	1	0	0	2	1	5 (4)	2	0	0
	MF	(Haiti) Zachary Herivaux	2 (3)	1	0	0	0	0	2 (3)	1	1	0
	DF	(Jamaica) Kevyn McFarlane	0	0	0	0	0	0	0	0	0	0
	MF	(Colombia) Juan Niño	1	0	0	0	1	0	2	0	0	0
	MF	(Mexico) Miguel Salazar	0	0	0	0	0	0	0	0	0	0

Last updated: October 30, 2017.
Source: San Antonio FC

=== Top scorers ===
The list is sorted by shirt number when total goals are equal.

Rnk	Pos	No.	Player	League	Playoffs	U.S. Open Cup	Total
1	MF	7	(Turks and Caicos Islands) Billy Forbes	10	0	0	10
2	FW	10	(Costa Rica) César Elizondo	4	2	0	6
2	MF	19	(United States) Kris Tyrpak	6	0	0	6
4	FW	99	(Mexico) Éver Guzmán	4	1	0	5
5	MF	16	(Colombia) Rafael Castillo	4	0	0	4
6	FW	14	(United States) Akwafei Ajeakwa	3	0	0	3
6	MF	23	(United States) Devin Vega	3	0	0	3
8	MF	8	(United States) Michael Reed	2	0	0	2
8	FW	9	(United States) Aly Hassan	1	0	1	2
8	MF	22	(Cameroon) Mark O'Ojong	2	0	0	2
11	MF	11	(Brazil) Victor Araujo	0	0	1	1
11	DF	13	(United States) Ben Newnam	1	0	0	1
11	DF	15	(United States) Stephen McCarthy	1	0	0	1
11	DF	25	(United States) Ryan Roushandel	1	0	0	1
11	MF	30	(Haiti) Zachary Herivaux	1	0	0	1
11	MF	91	(Jamaica) Owayne Gordon	1	0	0	1
#	Own goals			1	0	0	1
TOTALS				45	3	2	50

Last updated: October 30, 2017.
Source: San Antonio FC

=== Clean sheets ===
The list is sorted by shirt number when total clean sheets are equal.

Rnk	No.	Player	League	Playoffs	U.S. Open Cup	Total
1	24	(United States) Diego Restrepo	12	0	1	13
2	0	(United States) Matt Cardone	3	0	0	3
TOTALS			15	0	1	16

Last updated: October 30, 2017.
Source: San Antonio FC

=== Summary ===
Games played	36 (32 United Soccer League) (2 USL Playoffs) (2 U.S. Open Cup)
Games won	19 (17 United Soccer League) (1 USL Playoffs) (1 U.S. Open Cup)
Games drawn	13 (11 United Soccer League) (1 USL Playoffs) (1 U.S. Open Cup)
Games lost	4 (4 United Soccer League)
Goals scored	50 (45 United Soccer League) (3 USL Playoffs) (2 U.S. Open Cup)
Goals conceded	27 (24 United Soccer League) (2 USL Playoffs) (1 U.S. Open Cup)
Goal difference	23 (+21 United Soccer League) (+1 USL Playoffs) (+1 U.S. Open Cup)
Clean sheets	16 (15 United Soccer League) (1 U.S. Open Cup)
Yellow cards	71 (65 United Soccer League) (3 USL Playoffs) (3 U.S. Open Cup)
Red cards	3 (3 United Soccer League)
Most appearances	(United States) Greg Cochrane (Turks and Caicos Islands) Billy Forbes (34 appearances)
Top scorer	(Turks and Caicos Islands) Billy Forbes (10 goals)
Winning Percentage	Overall: 19/36 (52.78%)

Last updated: October 30, 2017.
Source: San Antonio FC

== Awards ==
=== Player ===
No.	Player	Award	Week/Month	Source
3	(United States) Sebastien Ibeagha	USL Team of the Week	Week 1	
7	(Turks and Caicos Islands) Billy Forbes	USL Team of the Week	Week 2	
7	(Turks and Caicos Islands) Billy Forbes	USL Team of the Week	Week 4	
7	(Turks and Caicos Islands) Billy Forbes	USL Team of the Week	Week 5	
10	(Costa Rica) César Elizondo	USL Player of the Week	Week 6	
7	(Turks and Caicos Islands) Billy Forbes	USL Team of the Week	Week 6	
23	(United States) Devin Vega	USL Goal of the Week	Week 6	
24	(United States) Diego Restrepo	USL Team of the Week	Week 7	
7	(Turks and Caicos Islands) Billy Forbes	USL Player of the Month	April	
14	(United States) Akwafei Ajeakwa	USL Goal of the Week	Week 9	
20	(United States) Greg Cochrane	USL Team of the Week	Week 9	
24	(United States) Diego Restrepo	USL Team of the Week	Week 10	
14	(United States) Akwafei Ajeakwa	USL Goal of the Month	May	
19	(United States) Kris Tyrpak	USL Team of the Week	Week 13	
24	(United States) Diego Restrepo	USL Midseason Goalkeeper of the Year	Midseason	
24	(United States) Diego Restrepo	USL Save of the Week	Week 19	
20	(United States) Greg Cochrane	USL Team of the Week	Week 23	
19	(United States) Kris Tyrpak	USL Goal of the Week	Week 23	
8	(United States) Michael Reed	USL Team of the Week	Week 24	
13	(United States) Ben Newnam	USL Team of the Week	Week 26	
21	(Cameroon) Mark O'Ojong	USL Team of the Week	Week 28	
99	(Mexico) Éver Guzmán	USL Player of the Week	Week 30	
End of Season Awards
3	(United States) Sebastien Ibeagha	2017 USL All-League First Team	November	
24	(United States) Diego Restrepo	2017 USL All-League First Team	November	
7	(Turks and Caicos Islands) Billy Forbes	2017 USL All-League Second Team	November	
24	(United States) Diego Restrepo	2017 USL Goalkeeper of the Year	November	
3	(United States) Sebastien Ibeagha	2017 USL Defender of the Year	November	
