= 2016 San Antonio FC season =

San Antonio FC
2016 season
- Owner: Spurs Sports & Entertainment
- Head coach: Darren Powell
- Stadium: Toyota Field
- USL: Conference: 10th Overall: 17th
- USL Playoffs: Did not qualify
- U.S. Open Cup: Fourth round
- Top goalscorer: League: Rafael Castillo; Franck Tayou (5 goals); All: Rafael Castillo; Franck Tayou (5 goals)
- Highest home attendance: 8,466 vs Swope Park Rangers (April 9, 2016)
- Lowest home attendance: 2,419 vs Corinthians FC of SA (May 19, 2016)
- Average home league attendance: 6,170
- Biggest win: 3–0 (April 3 at Seattle Sounders FC 2)
- Biggest defeat: 0–4 (June 15 at Houston Dynamo, USOC)

The 2016 San Antonio FC season was the club's inaugural season. Including the San Antonio Thunder of the original NASL and the former San Antonio Scorpions of the modern NASL, this was the 7th season of professional soccer in San Antonio. The club played in the United Soccer League, the third tier of the United States soccer league system, and also participated in the U.S. Open Cup.

== Background ==
San Antonio was awarded the thirty-first USL franchise on January 7, 2016. The establishment of the club, along with the concurrent purchase of Toyota Field by the City of San Antonio and Bexar County, was part of a plan by local officials to obtain an expansion franchise in Major League Soccer. As a result, the San Antonio Scorpions franchise of the North American Soccer League was shut down. The club's first head coach, announced on January 7, 2016, was former Elon University men's soccer coach and Orlando City SC ProAcademy director, Darren Powell. On February 2, 2016, Carlos Alvarez became the club's first player signing.

The league expanded from 24 to 29 teams where San Antonio competed in the Western Conference of the USL.

== Club ==
=== Coaching staff ===
Position	Staff
Head coach	(England) Darren Powell
Assistant coach	(Wales) Nick Evans
Assistant coach	(Scotland) Andy Thomson
Goalkeeper coach	(Mexico) Juan Lamadrid
Fitness coach	(Scotland) Andy Thomson
Team Physician	(United States) Eliot Young, M.D.
Athletic Trainer	Jordan Harding
Assistant Athletic Trainer	Chris Ramos
Equipment Manager	(United States) Rashad Moore
Pro Academy director	(Wales) Nick Evans

Source: San Antonio FC

=== Other information ===
Owner	(United States) Spurs Sports & Entertainment
Chairman	(United States) Julianna Hawn Holt
Managing Director	(United States) Tim Holt
Ground (capacity and dimensions)	Toyota Field (8,200 / 110x70 yards)
Training Ground	S.T.A.R. Soccer Complex

Source: San Antonio FC

== Squad information ==
=== First-team squad ===
As of August 15, 2016.

Squad No.	Name	Nationality	Position(s)	Date of Birth (Age)
Goalkeepers
0	Matt Cardone	(United States)	GK	June 18, 1993 (age 33)
1	Josh Ford	(United States)	GK	November 6, 1987 (age 38)
13	Lee Johnston	(United States)	GK	November 17, 1992 (age 33)
Defenders
2	Milton Palacios	(Honduras)	DF	April 17, 1988 (age 38)
4	Sam McBride	(United States)	DF	September 21, 1994 (age 32)
14	Biko Bradnock-Brennan	(Republic of Ireland)	DF	April 24, 1993 (age 33)
15	Stepthen McCarthy	(United States)	DF	July 21, 1988 (age 38)
19	Max Gunderson	(United States)	DF	November 5, 1989 (age 36)
20	Greg Cochrane	(United States)	DF	November 1, 1990 (age 35)
22	Austin Dunker	(United States)	DF	August 27, 1992 (age 34)
23	Fejiro Okiomah	(United States)	DF	November 10, 1990 (age 35)
25	Ryan Roushandel	(United States)	DF	November 11, 1985 (age 40)
Midfielders
6	Sébastien Thurière	(Haiti)	MF	January 6, 1990 (age 36)
7	Victor Araujo	(Brazil)	MF	June 25, 1991 (age 35)
8	Michael Reed	(United States)	MF	October 28, 1987 (age 38)
10	Carlos Alvarez	(United States)	MF	November 12, 1990 (age 35)
11	Danny Garcia	(United States)	MF	October 14, 1993 (age 32)
16	Rafael Castillo	(Colombia)	MF	June 6, 1980 (age 46)
28	Miguel Salazar	(Mexico)	MF	July 28, 1994 (age 32)
79	Diego Garcia	(United States)	MF	January 8, 1998 (age 28)
Forwards
5	César Elizondo	(Costa Rica)	FW	February 10, 1988 (age 38)
9	Manolo Sanchez	(Puerto Rico)	FW	November 10, 1991 (age 34)
12	Taylor Morgan	(England)	FW	October 21, 1990 (age 35)
17	Shawn Chin	(United States)	FW	May 11, 1989 (age 37)
18	Jason Johnson	(Jamaica)	FW	October 9, 1990 (age 35)
21	Jacques Francois	(Haiti)	FW	December 11, 1992 (age 33)
24	Franck Tayou	(United States)	FW	April 16, 1990 (age 36)

== Player movement ==
=== In ===
Pos	Player	Previous Club	Fee	Date	Source
MF	(United States) Carlos Alvarez	(United States) Colorado Rapids	Undisclosed	February 2, 2016	
DF	(United States) Stephen McCarthy	(Finland) KuPS	Undisclosed	February 3, 2016	
GK	(United States) Matt Cardone	(United States) San Antonio Scorpions	Undisclosed	February 4, 2016	
DF	(United States) Max Gunderson	(United States) Austin Aztex	Undisclosed	February 4, 2016	
MF	(Brazil) Victor Araujo	(United States) Trinity Tigers	Undisclosed	February 4, 2016	
MF	(Colombia) Rafael Castillo	(United States) San Antonio Scorpions	Undisclosed	February 4, 2016	
DF	(United States) Fejiro Okiomah	(United States) Pittsburgh Riverhounds	Undisclosed	February 10, 2016	
DF	(Honduras) Milton Palacios	(United States) San Antonio Scorpions	Undisclosed	February 10, 2016	
MF	(United States) Danny Garcia	(United States) FC Dallas	Undisclosed	February 11, 2016	
GK	(United States) Josh Ford	(United States) Orlando City SC	Undisclosed	February 12, 2016	
MF	(Mexico) Miguel Salazar	(United States) Elon University	Undisclosed	February 15, 2016	
DF	(United States) Sam McBride	(United States) Elon University	Undisclosed	February 15, 2016	
FW	(Jamaica) Jason Johnson	(United States) Chicago Fire	Undisclosed	February 16, 2016	
MF	(United States) Michael Reed	(United States) Atlanta Silverbacks	Undisclosed	February 17, 2016	
FW	(United States) Shawn Chin	(United States) Fort Lauderdale Strikers	Undisclosed	February 18, 2016	
MF	(Haiti) Sébastien Thurière	(United States) Charleston Battery	Undisclosed	February 18, 2016	
DF	(United States) Greg Cochrane	(United States) Chicago Fire	Undisclosed	February 25, 2016	
FW	(Puerto Rico) Manolo Sanchez	(United States) New York Red Bulls	Undisclosed	February 25, 2016	
DF	(United States) Austin Dunker	(United States) Seattle Sounders FC U-23	Undisclosed	March 18, 2016	
GK	(United States) Lee Johnston	(United States) West Virginia University	Undisclosed	March 18, 2016	
DF	(Republic of Ireland) Biko Bradnock-Brennan	(United States) UNC Charlotte	Undisclosed	March 29, 2016	
FW	(Haiti) Jacques Francois	(United States) UNC Greensboro	Undisclosed	March 29, 2016	
DF	(United States) Ryan Roushandel	(United States) Austin Aztex	Undisclosed	May 5, 2016	
FW	(United States) Franck Tayou	(Mexico) Soles de Sonora	Undisclosed	June 16, 2016	
FW	(England) Taylor Morgan	(United States) Tulsa Roughnecks FC	Undisclosed	June 22, 2016	
MF	(United States) Diego Garcia	(United States) Lonestar SC Academy U-17/18	Undisclosed	July 7, 2016	
FW	(Costa Rica) César Elizondo	(Costa Rica) Pérez Zeledón	Undisclosed	July 11, 2016	

=== Out ===
Pos	Player	Transferred To	Fee	Date	Source

=== Loan in ===
Pos	Player	Loaned From	Start	End	Source
DF	(Republic of Ireland) Bobby Moseley	(England) Stoke City F.C.	March 23, 2016	June 11, 2016	

=== Loan out ===
Pos	Player	Loaned To	Start	End	Source
DF	(United States) Ryan Roushandel	(United States) Wilmington Hammerheads FC	July 30, 2016	July 30, 2016	

== Pre-season ==
The pre-season match against Rayo OKC was announced by Rayo OKC on February 2, 2016. Remaining pre-season matches were announced on March 4, 2016, by SAFC.

February 27, 2016	Rayo OKC	1–1	San Antonio FC	Dallas, Texas
2:00 PM CDT	Michel	Report	Palacios	Stadium: MVC Sports Complex; Attendance: Closed-door

March 5, 2016	San Antonio FC	0–0	St. Edward's University	San Antonio, Texas
11:00 AM CDT		Report		Stadium: Toyota Field; Attendance: Closed-door
Note: 35-minute halves

March 5, 2016	San Antonio FC	2–0	St. Mary's University	San Antonio, Texas
1:00 PM CDT	Johnson 35'; Trialist	Report		Stadium: Toyota Field; Attendance: Closed-door
Note: 35-minute halves

March 12, 2016	San Antonio FC	5–0	Dallas City FC	San Antonio, Texas
2:00 PM CDT	Johnson, McCarthy; Sanchez; Castillo (pen.)	Report		Stadium: Toyota Field; Attendance: Closed-door

March 16, 2016	San Antonio FC	2–1	Corinthians FC of San Antonio	San Antonio, Texas
2:00 PM CDT	Johnson (pen.); Trialist	Report	Cacho	Stadium: Toyota Field; Attendance: Closed-door

March 19, 2016	San Antonio FC	1–0	Rio Grande Valley FC Toros	San Antonio, Texas
5:00 PM CDT	Garcia (o.g.); Palacios (yellow card); Cochrane (yellow card)			Stadium: Toyota Field; Attendance: Closed-door

March 24, 2016	San Antonio FC	3–0	University of the Incarnate Word	San Antonio, Texas
5:00 PM CDT	Garcia (pen.); Araujo 62'; Okiomah	Report		Stadium: Toyota Field; Attendance: Closed-door

March 24, 2016	San Antonio FC	3–2	Trinity University	San Antonio, Texas
7:00 PM CDT	Reed; Sanchez 42'; Johnson 78'	Report	85'	Stadium: Toyota Field; Attendance: Closed-door

== Competitions ==
=== Overall ===
Position in the Western Conference

Competition	Started round	Final position / round	First match	Last match
United Soccer League	—	10th	April 3, 2016	September 24, 2016
U.S. Open Cup	Second Round	Fourth round	May 18, 2016	June 15, 2016

Updated to match played September 25, 2016
Source: Competitions

=== Overview ===
Competition	Record							
Competition	G	W	D	L	GF	GA	GD	Win %
United Soccer League	30	10	8	12	36	36	+0	33.33
U.S. Open Cup	3	2	0	1	5	6	−1	66.67
Total	33	12	8	13	41	42	−1	36.36

Updated to match played September 25, 2016
Source: Competitions

=== United Soccer League ===
==== League table ====
Pos	Team	Pld	W	D	L	GF	GA	GD	Pts	Qualification
8	Orange County Blues	30	12	4	14	39	41	−2	40	Conference Playoffs
9	Portland Timbers 2	30	12	4	14	38	42	−4	40	
10	San Antonio FC	30	10	8	12	36	36	0	38	
11	Real Monarchs	30	10	6	14	31	41	−10	36	
12	Seattle Sounders 2	30	9	8	13	35	50	−15	35	

Source: 2016 USL Standings
Rules for classification: 1) total wins; 2) total goal differential; 3) total goals scored; 4) points earned against top four Conference finishers; 5) disciplinary points; 6) coin toss or drawing of lots

==== Results summary ====
Overall								Home						Away					
Pld	W	D	L	GF	GA	GD	Pts	W	D	L	GF	GA	GD	W	D	L	GF	GA	GD
30	10	8	12	36	36	0	38	7	4	4	23	18	+5	3	4	8	13	18	−5

Last updated: September 25, 2016.

==== Results by matchday ====
Position in the Western Conference

Round	1	2	3	4	5	6	7	8	9	10	11	12	13	14	15	16	17	18	19	20	21	22	23	24	25	26	27	28	29	30
Stadium	A	H	A	A	A	H	H	A	H	H	A	A	H	H	A	H	H	H	A	A	A	H	H	A	A	H	H	A	H	A
Result	W	D	D	L	L	W	L	D	L	D	L	D	W	W	W	D	W	L	L	D	L	W	W	W	L	D	L	L	W	L
Position	6	7	7	9	12	5	9	10	12	12	12	13	13	12	10	11	7	9	10	12	14	12	8	8	9	8	9	10	8	10

Updated to match(es) played on September 25, 2016. Source:
A = Away; H = Home; W = Win; D = Draw; L = Loss

==== Matches ====
The 2016 schedule was released on January 26, 2016. Home team is listed first, left to right.

Win Draw Loss

Kickoff times are in CDT (UTC−05) unless shown otherwise

April 3, 2016 1	Seattle Sounders FC 2	0–3	San Antonio FC	Tukwila, Washington
7:00 p.m. CDT	O'Ojong (yellow card)	Report	Johnson 3', 10'; Okiomah 79'; Chin (yellow card)	Stadium: Starfire Sports Complex; Referee: Chipalo Street

April 9, 2016 2	San Antonio FC	1–1	Swope Park Rangers	San Antonio, Texas
7:30 p.m. CDT	Garcia 42'; Reed (yellow card) 73'; Araujo (yellow card) 90+'	Report	Sallói 2'; Meyer (yellow card) 59'	Stadium: Toyota Field; Attendance: 8,466; Referee: Michael Lavergne
Note: Toyota Field attendance record

April 13, 2016 3	LA Galaxy II	1–1	San Antonio FC	Carson, California
9:30 p.m. CDT	McBean 40'; Rebellón (yellow card) 75'	Report	Thurière (yellow card); Alvarez 89'	Stadium: StubHub Center; Attendance: 503; Referee: Michael Zapata

April 16, 2016 4	Orange County Blues FC	1–0	San Antonio FC	Irvine, California
9:00 p.m. CDT	Cortes (yellow card) 29'; Crettenand 39' (pen.); Popara (yellow card) 45'; Pluntke (yellow card) 67'	Report	Castillo (yellow card) 31'; Garcia (yellow card) 43'; McBride (yellow card) 64'	Stadium: Anteater Stadium; Attendance: 1,224; Referee: Vincent Apple-Chiarella

April 23, 2016 5	Colorado Springs Switchbacks FC	1–0	San Antonio FC	Colorado Springs, Colorado
2:30 p.m. CDT	Maybin 59'	Report	Palacios (yellow card) 30'; Castillo (yellow card) 69'	Stadium: Sand Creek Stadium; Referee: Victor Rivas

April 30, 2016 6	San Antonio FC	3–1	Tulsa Roughnecks FC	San Antonio, Texas
7:30 p.m. CDT	Chin 38'; Castillo 68'; Johnson 88'	Report	Ochoa (yellow card) 43'; Kaleem 49'	Stadium: Toyota Field; Attendance: 7,837; Referee: Marco Vega

May 7, 2016 7	San Antonio FC	2–3	Rio Grande Valley FC Toros	San Antonio, Texas
7:30 p.m. CDT	Sanchez 79'; Chin 84'	Report	Lovejoy 69'; Manotas 72'; Lovejoy 90+'	Stadium: Toyota Field; Attendance: 5,885; Referee: Matthew Kreitzer

May 15, 2016 8	OKC Energy FC	1–1	San Antonio FC	Oklahoma City, Oklahoma
6:00 p.m. CDT	König 37'	Report	Garcia 18'	Stadium: Taft Stadium; Attendance: 5,393; Referee: Luigi Lazareno

May 21, 2016 9	San Antonio FC	0–1	OKC Energy FC	San Antonio, Texas
7:30 p.m. CDT	Garcia (yellow card) 27'	Report	Bonner 58'; Gonzalez (yellow card) 86'; Byskov (yellow card) 89'	Stadium: Toyota Field; Attendance: 6,165; Referee: Alejandro Mariscal

May 25, 2016 10	San Antonio FC	0–0	Rio Grande Valley FC Toros	San Antonio, Texas
7:30 p.m. CDT	Salazar (yellow card) 34'; Cochrane (yellow card) 65'; Bradnock-Brennan (yellow card) 76'	Report	Greene (yellow card) 56'; Ward (yellow card) 64'	Stadium: Toyota Field; Attendance: 4,650; Referee: Brandon Artis

June 4, 2016 11	Rio Grande Valley FC Toros	1–0	San Antonio FC	Edinburg, Texas
7:30 p.m. CDT	Garcia 41'; Garcia (yellow card) 42'; Escalante (yellow card) 80'	Report	McCarthy (yellow card) 41'; Castillo (yellow card) 44'; Palacios (yellow card) 78'; Araujo (yellow card) 83'	Stadium: UTRGV Soccer and Track Complex; Attendance: 2,431; Referee: Chipalo Street

June 11, 2016 12	Portland Timbers 2	1–1	San Antonio FC	Portland, Oregon
9:00 p.m. CDT	Gallagher (yellow card) 13'; Alvarez 15' (o.g.); Casiple (yellow card) 32'; Belmar (red card) 83'; Morley (yellow card) 87'	Report	Ford (yellow card) 16'; Thurière (yellow card) 38'; Palacios 87'; Francois (yellow card) 87'; Alvarez (yellow card) 87'	Stadium: Merlo Field; Attendance: 1,784; Referee: Daniel Radford

June 18, 2016 13	San Antonio FC	2–1	Colorado Springs Switchbacks FC	San Antonio, Texas
7:30 p.m. CDT	Araujo 8'; McCarthy 35'	Report	Vercollone 50' (pen.) (yellow card) 57'	Stadium: Toyota Field; Attendance: 6,052; Referee: Michael Lavergne

June 23, 2016 14	San Antonio FC	3–2	Orange County Blues FC	San Antonio, Texas
7:30 p.m. CDT	Reed 17'; Tayou 74'; Palacios 80'; Garcia (yellow card) 83'; Ford (yellow card) 90'	Report	Felix (yellow card) 36'; Meeus 41'; Howe (yellow card) 45'; Crettenand 50'	Stadium: Toyota Field; Attendance: 4,593; Referee: Luis Guardia

July 3, 2016 15	Tulsa Roughnecks FC	1–2	San Antonio FC	Tulsa, Oklahoma
7:30 p.m. CDT	Manhebo (yellow card) 43'; Taylor (yellow card) 50'; Ochoa (yellow card) 62'; Carpio 90'	Report	McCarthy (yellow card) 23'; Reed 56'; Tayou 80'	Stadium: ONEOK Field; Attendance: 3,427; Referee: Rosendo Mendoza

July 9, 2016 16	San Antonio FC	0–0	OKC Energy FC	San Antonio, Texas
7:30 p.m. CDT	Morgan (yellow card) 21'; Ford (red card) 69'	Report	Dalgaard (yellow card) 60'; Thomas (red card) 69'	Stadium: Toyota Field; Attendance: 5,855; Referee: Younes Marrakchi

July 16, 2016 17	San Antonio FC	2–0	Whitecaps FC 2	San Antonio, Texas
7:30 p.m. CDT	Salazar (yellow card) 18'; Castillo 64' (pen.); Alvarez (yellow card) 69'; Thurière (yellow card) 76'; Tayou 90'	Report	Greig (yellow card) 41'; Froese (yellow card) 78'; Bustos (yellow card) 90'	Stadium: Toyota Field; Attendance: 6,025; Referee: Ramy Touchan

July 23, 2016 18	San Antonio FC	2–3	LA Galaxy II	San Antonio, Texas
7:30 p.m. CDT	Castillo 3'; Palacios (yellow card) 54'; Castillo (yellow card) 71'; McCarthy 84'; McCarthy (yellow card) 89'; Reed (yellow card) 90'; Garcia (yellow card) 90'	Report	Villarreal 5'; McBean 19'; Slager (yellow card) 20'; Villarreal 35'; Villarreal (yellow card) 38'; McBean (yellow card) 89'; Amaya (yellow card) 90'	Stadium: Toyota Field; Attendance: 7,690; Referee: Reyna Fonseca

July 30, 2016 19	Swope Park Rangers	2–1	San Antonio FC	Kansas City, Missouri
7:30 p.m. CDT	Ualefi (yellow card) 4'; Alvarado (yellow card) 48'; Kelly 71'; Gonzalez 80'	Report	Reed 30'; Johnson (yellow card) 65'; Bradnock-Brennan (yellow card) 76'	Stadium: Children's Mercy Victory Field; Attendance: 1,448; Referee: Luis Guardia

August 6, 2016 20	Sacramento Republic FC	1–1	San Antonio FC	Sacramento, California
10:00 p.m. CDT	Kiffe (yellow card) 81'; Guzmán 90' (pen.)	Report	Elizondo 15'; McCarthy (yellow card) 66'; Alvarez (yellow card) 84'; Salazar (yellow card) 90'	Stadium: Bonney Field; Attendance: 11,569; Referee: Victor Rivas

August 13, 2016 21	Arizona United SC	1–0	San Antonio FC	Peoria, Arizona
9:30 p.m. CDT	Blackwood 73'; Silva (yellow card) 85'; Gavin (yellow card) 90+'	Report	Morgan (yellow card) 7'; Salazar (yellow card) 24'; Elizondo (yellow card) 75'	Stadium: Peoria Sports Complex; Attendance: 1,362; Referee: Ramy Touchan

August 17, 2016 22	San Antonio FC	3–2	Arizona United SC	San Antonio, Texas
7:30 p.m. CDT	Tayou (yellow card) 27'; Alvarez 32'; Tayou 43'; Elizondo (yellow card) 45'; Elizondo 56'; Bradnock-Brennan (yellow card) 86'	Report	West (yellow card) 20'; Rooney 45', 86' (pen.)	Stadium: Toyota Field; Attendance: 4,326; Referee: Marco Veiga

August 20, 2016 23	San Antonio FC	1–0	Seattle Sounders FC 2	San Antonio, Texas
7:30 p.m. CDT	Castillo 51'	Report		Stadium: Toyota Field; Attendance: 6,417; Referee: Kyle Phillips

August 27, 2016 24	Saint Louis FC	0–2	San Antonio FC	Fenton, Missouri
7:30 p.m. CDT	Fink (yellow card) 28'; Doody (yellow card) 88'	Report	Thurière 12'; Castillo 45'; Gunderson (yellow card) 60'; Castillo (yellow card) 90'	Stadium: Marshall Wireless Stadium; Attendance: 5,262; Referee: Jose Lara

August 31, 2016 25	Swope Park Rangers	2–1	San Antonio FC	Kansas City, Missouri
7:30 p.m. CDT	Gonzalez 3'; Didic (yellow card) 80'; Ayrton 90' (pen.)	Report	Okiomah 8'; Bradnock-Brennan (yellow card) 71'	Stadium: Children's Mercy Victory Field; Attendance: 996; Referee: Dule Djurasevic
Note: 25th USL league match

September 4, 2016 26	San Antonio FC	1–1	Arizona United SC	San Antonio, Texas
5:00 p.m. CDT	Alvarez 43'; Gunderson (yellow card) 56'; Cardone (yellow card) 79'	Report	Tan 9'; Tan (yellow card) 72'; Ringhof (yellow card) 75'	Stadium: Toyota Field; Attendance: 5,569; Referee: Patrick Muana

September 10, 2016 27	San Antonio FC	1–3	Saint Louis FC	San Antonio, Texas
7:30 p.m. CDT	Alvarez 32'; Morgan (yellow card) 42'; Bradnock-Brennan (yellow card) 90'	Report	Herrera 12', 16', 54'; Pais (yellow card) 86'	Stadium: Toyota Field; Attendance: 6,251; Referee: Luis Guardia

September 14, 2016 28	Real Monarchs	2–0	San Antonio FC	Sandy, Utah
8:00 p.m. CDT	Lachowecki (yellow card) 43'; Adams 73'; Velazco (yellow card) 77'; Báez 82'; Okwuonu (yellow card) 86'	Report	Thurière (yellow card) 35'	Stadium: Rio Tinto Stadium; Attendance: 1,963; Referee: Brad Jensen

September 17, 2016 29	San Antonio FC	2–0	Tulsa Roughnecks FC	San Antonio, Texas
7:30 p.m. CDT	Salazar (yellow card) 39'; Tayou 49'; Chin 87'	Report	Morgan (yellow card) 70'; Abidor (yellow card) 84'	Stadium: Toyota Field; Attendance: 6,735; Referee: Tyler Mitcham

September 24, 2016 30	Rio Grande Valley FC Toros	3–0	San Antonio FC	Edinburg, Texas
7:30 p.m. CDT	Murphy (yellow card) 45'; Bird 78'; Luna 83'; Arboleda 90'	Report	Alvarez (yellow card) 20'; Palacios (yellow card) 62'	Stadium: UTRGV Soccer and Track Complex; Attendance: 2,646; Referee: Kyle Phillips

=== Lamar Hunt U.S. Open Cup ===
May 18, 2016 Second Round	San Antonio FC (Texas)	3–1	(Texas) Corinthians FC of San Antonio	San Antonio, Texas
7:30 p.m. CDT	Johnson 3'; Francois (yellow card) 16'; Araujo (yellow card) 43'; Francois 70', 74'	Report	Chapman-Page 47'	Stadium: Toyota Field; Attendance: 2,419; Referee: Luis Guardia

June 1, 2016 Third Round	Des Moines Menace (Iowa)	1–2	(Texas) San Antonio FC	Des Moines, Iowa
8:00 PM CDT	Flath 59'; Ledbetter (yellow card) 71'; Ibisevic (red card) 90'	Report	Alvarez (yellow card) 89'; McBride 72'; Francois 81'; Garcia (yellow card) 89'; Francois (yellow card) 90'	Stadium: Valley Stadium; Attendance: 1,754; Referee: Kyle Burkhardt

June 15, 2016 Fourth round	Houston Dynamo (Texas)	4–0	(Texas) San Antonio FC	Houston, Texas
7:15 PM CDT	Manotas 39'; Alex 45+5'; Rodríguez 60'; Miranda 66'	Report		Stadium: BBVA Compass Stadium; Attendance: 5,807; Referee: Leszek Stalmach

== Statistics ==
=== Appearances ===
Discipline includes both league and Open Cup play.

No.	Pos.	Name	League		U.S. Open Cup		Total		Discipline	
No.	Pos.	Name	Apps	Goals	Apps	Goals	Apps	Goals	Yellow card	Red card
0	GK	(United States) Matt Cardone	13 (1)	0	0	0	13 (1)	0	1	0
1	GK	(United States) Josh Ford	17	0	3	0	20	0	2	1
2	DF	(Honduras) Milton Palacios	18 (3)	2	1 (1)	0	19 (4)	2	4	0
4	DF	(United States) Sam McBride	18 (5)	0	3	1	21 (5)	1	1	0
5	FW	(Costa Rica) César Elizondo	6 (3)	2	0	0	6 (3)	2	2	0
6	MF	(Haiti) Sébastien Thurière	15 (7)	1	1	0	16 (7)	1	4	0
7	MF	(Brazil) Victor Araujo	3 (8)	1	2 (1)	0	5 (9)	1	3	0
8	MF	(United States) Michael Reed	14 (2)	3	2	0	16 (2)	3	2	0
9	FW	(Puerto Rico) Manolo Sanchez	3 (13)	1	0	0	3 (13)	1	0	0
10	MF	(United States) Carlos Alvarez	29 (1)	4 (1)	2	0	31 (1)	4 (1)	5	0
11	MF	(United States) Danny Garcia	10 (15)	2	1 (1)	0	11 (16)	2	5	0
12	FW	(England) Taylor Morgan	12 (2)	0	0	0	12 (2)	0	3	0
13	GK	(United States) Lee Johnston	0	0	0	0	0	0	0	0
14	DF	(Republic of Ireland) Biko Bradnock-Brennan	20 (4)	0	1 (2)	0	21 (6)	0	5	0
15	DF	(United States) Stephen McCarthy	19	2	2	0	21	2	4	0
16	MF	(Colombia) Rafael Castillo	25 (3)	5	1	0	26 (3)	5	5	0
17	FW	(United States) Shawn Chin	9 (8)	3	1 (1)	0	10 (9)	3	1	0
18	FW	(Jamaica) Jason Johnson	17 (9)	3	3	1	20 (9)	4	2	0
19	DF	(United States) Max Gunderson	7 (3)	0	1	0	8 (3)	0	2	0
20	DF	(United States) Greg Cochrane	29 (1)	0	3	0	32 (1)	0	2	0
21	FW	(Haiti) Jacques Francois	2 (5)	0	2 (1)	3	4 (6)	3	3	0
22	DF	(United States) Austin Dunker	0	0	0	0	0	0	0	0
23	DF	(United States) Fejiro Okiomah	8 (7)	2	0	0	8 (7)	2	0	0
24	FW	(United States) Franck Tayou	6 (11)	5	0	0	6 (11)	5	1	0
25	DF	(United States) Ryan Roushandel	3	0	0	0	3	0	0	0
28	MF	(Mexico) Miguel Salazar	18 (6)	0	1	0	19 (6)	0	5	0
79	MF	(United States) Diego Garcia	0	0	0	0	0	0	0	0
Players who left the club
	DF	(Republic of Ireland) Bobby Moseley	9 (2)	0	2	0	11 (2)	0	0	0

Last updated: September 26, 2016.
Source: San Antonio FC

=== Top scorers ===
The list is sorted by shirt number when total goals are equal.

Rnk	Pos	No.	Player	League	U.S. Open Cup	Total
1	MF	16	(Colombia) Rafael Castillo	5	0	5
1	FW	24	(United States) Franck Tayou	5	0	5
3	MF	10	(United States) Carlos Alvarez	4	0	4
3	FW	18	(Jamaica) Jason Johnson	3	1	4
5	MF	8	(United States) Michael Reed	3	0	3
5	FW	17	(United States) Shawn Chin	3	0	3
5	FW	21	(Haiti) Jacques Francois	0	3	3
8	DF	2	(Honduras) Milton Palacios	2	0	2
8	FW	5	(Costa Rica) César Elizondo	2	0	2
8	MF	11	(United States) Danny Garcia	2	0	2
8	DF	15	(United States) Stephen McCarthy	2	0	2
8	DF	23	(United States) Fejiro Okiomah	2	0	2
13	DF	4	(United States) Sam McBride	0	1	1
13	MF	6	(Haiti) Sébastien Thurière	1	0	1
13	MF	7	(Brazil) Victor Araujo	1	0	1
13	FW	9	(Puerto Rico) Manolo Sanchez	1	0	1
TOTALS				36	5	41

Last updated: September 19, 2016.
Source: San Antonio FC

=== Clean sheets ===
The list is sorted by shirt number when total clean sheets are equal.

Rnk	No.	Player	League	U.S. Open Cup	Total
1	0	(United States) Matt Cardone	4	0	4
2	1	(United States) Josh Ford	2	0	2
TOTALS			6	0	6

Last updated: September 19, 2016.
Source: San Antonio FC

=== Summary ===
Games played	33 (30 United Soccer League) (3 U.S. Open Cup)
Games won	12 (10 United Soccer League) (2 U.S. Open Cup)
Games drawn	8 (8 United Soccer League)
Games lost	13 (12 United Soccer League) (1 U.S. Open Cup)
Goals scored	41 (36 United Soccer League) (5 U.S. Open Cup)
Goals conceded	42 (36 United Soccer League) (6 U.S. Open Cup)
Goal difference	-1 (+0 United Soccer League) (−1 U.S. Open Cup)
Clean sheets	7 (7 United Soccer League)
Yellow cards	62 (57 United Soccer League) (5 U.S. Open Cup)
Red cards	1 (1 United Soccer League)
Most appearances	(United States) Greg Cochrane (33 appearances)
Top scorer	(Colombia) Rafael Castillo (United States) Franck Tayou (5 goals)
Winning Percentage	Overall: 12/33 (36.36%)

Last updated: September 25, 2016.
Source: San Antonio FC

== Awards ==
=== Player ===
No.	Player	Award	Week	Source
18	(Jamaica) Jason Johnson	USL Team of the Week	Week 2	
16	(Colombia) Rafael Castillo	USL Team of the Week	Week 6	
4	(United States) Sam McBride	USL Team of the Week	Week 8	
2	(Honduras) Milton Palacios	USL Team of the Week	Week 12	
15	(United States) Stephen McCarthy	USL Team of the Week	Week 13	
21	(Haiti) Jacques Francois	USL Team of the Week	Week 14	
8	(United States) Michael Reed	USL Team of the Week	Week 15	
20	(United States) Greg Cochrane	USL Team of the Week	Week 16	
5	(Costa Rica) César Elizondo	USL Team of the Week	Week 20	
16	(Colombia) Rafael Castillo	USL Team of the Week	Week 22	
0	(United States) Matt Cardone	USL Player of the Week	Week 23	
