= 2015 Seattle Sounders FC season =

American soccer team season

Seattle Sounders FC
2015 season
- General manager: Garth Lagerwey
- Head coach: Sigi Schmid
- Stadium: CenturyLink Field
- Major League Soccer: Conference: 4th Overall: 6th
- MLS Cup playoffs: Conference Semifinals
- U.S. Open Cup: Fourth round
- CONCACAF Champions League (2015–16): Quarterfinals
- Top goalscorer: League: Obafemi Martins (15); All: Obafemi Martins (15)
- Highest home attendance: 64,358 (Aug. 30 vs. Portland)
- Lowest home attendance: League: 39,175 (Mar. 14 vs. San Jose); All: 37,106 (Aug. 19 vs. Olimpia, CCL)
- Average home league attendance: Regular season: 44,245; Playoffs: 39,568; All: 39,877
- Biggest win: League: 4–0 vs. Orlando (Aug. 16)
- Biggest defeat: League: 1–4 at Portland (June 28)
Home colors	Away colors	Third colors

The 2015 Seattle Sounders FC season was the club's seventh season in Major League Soccer, the United States' top-tier of professional soccer. Including previous Seattle Sounders franchises, this was the 35th season of a soccer team playing in the Seattle metro area.

== Background ==
The Sounders came into the 2015 season following a successful 2014, winning the U.S. Open Cup for the fourth time as well as winning the Supporters' Shield for the first time in franchise history. By winning the Double, the Sounders became the sixth Major League Soccer team to win two major trophies in one season. This was the first time a club managed to win two trophies since the 2011 Los Angeles Galaxy. It was also the first time since the 2003 Chicago Fire for a team to do the Open Cup/League double.

Seattle also qualified for the 2014 MLS Cup Playoffs for the sixth consecutive time. Seattle came into the playoffs with the ability to become the first MLS club to win the Treble. Seattle ended up losing in the Conference Finals 2-2 on aggregate, losing by away goals.

By virtue of winning the Supporters' Shield, the Sounders qualified for the CONCACAF Champions League after a two-year drought from the competition.

== Roster ==
Major League Soccer teams are limited to eight players without U.S. citizenship, a permanent resident (green card holder), or the holder of other special status (e.g., refugee or asylum status). These international roster slots can be traded. Sounders FC began the 2015 MLS season with eight international slots; it was announced they traded with DC United for a ninth slot during the Summer Transfer Window. Note: Flags indicate national team as defined under FIFA eligibility rules; some limited exceptions apply. Players may hold more than one non-FIFA nationality. Squad correct as of April 4, 2015.

No.	Pos.	Nation	Player
1	GK	USA	Troy Perkins
2	MF	USA	Clint Dempsey (DP)
3	MF	USA	Brad Evans (c)
4	DF	ENG	Tyrone Mears
5	MF	ENG	Andy Rose
6	MF	CUB	Osvaldo Alonso
7	MF	USA	Cristian Roldan (GA)
8	MF	MEX	Gonzalo Pineda
9	FW	NGA	Obafemi Martins (DP)
10	MF	GUA	Marco Pappa
11	MF	USA	Aaron Kovar (HGP)
12	DF	CRC	Leonardo González
13	DF	COL	Andrés Correa
14	DF	USA	Chad Marshall
15	DF	USA	Dylan Remick
16	FW	PAR	Nelson Valdez (DP)
17	FW	USA	Darwin Jones (HGP)
18	MF	BRA	Thomás Jaguaribe
19	FW	USA	Chad Barrett
20	DF	USA	Zach Scott
21	DF	USA	Jimmy Ockford
22	GK	USA	Charlie Lyon
23	MF	AUT	Andreas Ivanschitz
24	GK	SUI	Stefan Frei
27	MF	USA	Lamar Neagle
28	MF	SWE	Erik Friberg
29	DF	PAN	Román Torres
31	DF	JAM	Damion Lowe (GA)
42	MF	UGA	Micheal Azira
80	FW	USA	Victor Mansaray (HGP)
91	DF	JAM	Oniel Fisher
99	FW	USA	Andy Craven (DL)

== Competitions ==
=== Preseason ===
February 4, 2015 Friendly	UCLA Bruins	0–5	Seattle Sounders FC	Walnut, California
19:00 PST		Report	Martins 39'; Neagle 44'; Barrett 77'; Cooper 86'; Azira 90'	Stadium: Hilmer Lodge Stadium; Referee: Reed Christy

February 6, 2015	LA Galaxy	2–1	Seattle Sounders FC	Carson, California
11:30 PST	Husidic 18'; Maganto 54'	Report	Pappa 26'	Stadium: StubHub Center

February 19, 2015 Friendly	Seattle Sounders FC	1–1	Minnesota United FC	Tucson, Arizona
11:30 MT	Cooper 57'	Report	Ibarra 63'	Stadium: Kino North Stadium

==== Desert Diamond Cup ====
February 18, 2015 Game 3	FC Tucson	0–6	Seattle Sounders FC	Tucson, Arizona
20:00 MST		Report	Neagle 4', 27'; Dempsey 11', 37'; Mears (yellow card) 31'; Parsemain 87', 89'	Stadium: Kino North Stadium; Attendance: 1,856

February 21, 2015 Game 6	Seattle Sounders FC	2–3	Sporting Kansas City	Tucson, Arizona
20:00 MST	Pineda (yellow card) 22'; Mansaray 74'; Cooper 81'	Report	Németh (yellow card) 25', (goal) 39'; Besler (yellow card) 27'; Zusi 34'; Añor (yellow card) 42'; Sinovic (yellow card) 67'; Rogers 73'; Lopez (yellow card) 88'	Stadium: Kino North Stadium; Attendance: 3,661 (Stadium record)

February 25, 2015 Game 8	Seattle Sounders FC	1–2	New England Revolution	Tucson, Arizona
18:00 MST	Cooper 4'; Jones (yellow card) 42'; Roldan (yellow card) 59'; Lowe (yellow card) 74'	Report	Lowe 47' (o.g.); Fagundez (yellow card) 44'; Rudy (red card) 60'; Davies 90' (pen.)	Stadium: Kino North Grandstand

February 28, 2015 Game 10	Seattle Sounders FC	1–1	Sporting Kansas City	Tucson, Arizona
TBD	Azira (yellow card) 12'; Martins 62'; Neagle (yellow card) 50'; Pineda (red card) 76'	Report	Hallisey 8' (yellow card) 36'	Stadium: Kino North Stadium

=== Major League Soccer ===
==== League tables ====
===== Western Conference =====
Pos	Team	Pld	W	L	T	GF	GA	GD	Pts	Qualification
2	Vancouver Whitecaps FC	34	16	13	5	45	36	+9	53	MLS Cup Conference Semifinals
3	Portland Timbers	34	15	11	8	41	39	+2	53	MLS Cup Knockout Round
4	Seattle Sounders FC	34	15	13	6	44	36	+8	51	MLS Cup Knockout Round
5	LA Galaxy	34	14	11	9	56	46	+10	51	MLS Cup Knockout Round
6	Sporting Kansas City	34	14	11	9	48	45	+3	51	MLS Cup Knockout Round

Source: MLS

===== Overall =====
Pos	Team	Pld	W	L	T	GF	GA	GD	Pts	Qualification
4	Columbus Crew	34	15	11	8	58	53	+5	53	
5	Portland Timbers (C)	34	15	11	8	41	39	+2	53	CONCACAF Champions League
6	Seattle Sounders FC	34	15	13	6	44	36	+8	51	
7	Montreal Impact	34	15	13	6	48	44	+4	51	
8	D.C. United	34	15	13	6	43	45	−2	51	

Source: MLS
Rules for classification: 1) points; 2) total wins; 3) total goal differential; 4) total goals scored
(C) MLS Cup Champion

==== Results summary ====
Overall								Home						Away					
Pld	W	D	L	GF	GA	GD	Pts	W	D	L	GF	GA	GD	W	D	L	GF	GA	GD
33	14	6	13	41	35	+6	48	10	2	4	23	13	+10	4	4	9	18	22	−4

Last updated: October 20, 2015.
Source: MLS

==== Results by matchday ====
Matchday	1	2	3	4	5	6	7	8	9	10	11	12	13	14	15	16	17	18	19	20	21	22	23	24	25	26	27	28	29	30	31	32	33	34
Stadium	H	H	A	H	A	A	H	A	A	A	H	A	H	A	H	H	A	A	H	A	H	A	H	A	H	A	H	H	A	A	A	H	A	H
Result	W	L	D	W	L	W	W	W	L	W	D	W	W	L	W	L	L	L	W	L	L	L	L	L	W	L	W	W	D	W	D	D	D	W

Updated to match(es) played on October 20, 2015. Source: MLS
A = Away; H = Home; W = Win; D = Draw; L = Loss

==== Matches ====
March 8, 2015 MLS 1	Seattle Sounders FC	3–0	New England Revolution	Seattle, Washington
18:30 (PDT)	Dempsey 25' (pen.), 67'; Martins 41'	Report	Gonçalves (yellow card) 73'	Stadium: CenturyLink Field; Attendance: 39,782; Referee: Juan Guzman

March 14, 2015 MLS 2	Seattle Sounders FC	2–3	San Jose Earthquakes	Seattle, Washington
18:00 (PDT)	Dempsey 1'; Azira (yellow card) 57'; Martins 84'; Roldan (yellow card) 90+4'	Report	Wondolowski 13', 48'; Bernárdez (red card) 52'; Emeghara 70', (yellow card) 85'	Stadium: CenturyLink Field; Attendance: 39,175; Referee: Baldomero Toledo

March 28, 2015 MLS 3	FC Dallas	0–0	Seattle Sounders FC	Frisco, Texas
17:30 (PDT)	Acosta (red card) 18'; Zimmerman (yellow card) 80'	Report	Azira (yellow card) 57'; González (yellow card) 90+2'	Stadium: Toyota Stadium; Attendance: 18,333; Referee: Kevin Stott

April 4, 2015 MLS 4	Seattle Sounders FC	1–0	Houston Dynamo	Seattle, Washington
19:00 (PDT)	Rose (yellow card) 17'; Martins 39'; Pineda (red card) 56'	Report	Garrido (yellow card) 39'; Clark (yellow card) 45+3'; Taylor (yellow card) 52'	Stadium: CenturyLink Field; Attendance: 39,860; Referee: Ted Unkel

April 12, 2015 MLS 5	LA Galaxy	1–0	Seattle Sounders FC	Carson, California
16:00 (PDT)	Gordon 23', (yellow card) 90+3'; Gargan (yellow card) 27'; Husidić (yellow card) 81'; Juninho (yellow card) 88'	Report	Martins (yellow card) 34'; Marshall (yellow card) 45+2'	Stadium: StubHub Center; Attendance: 27,000; Referee: Mark Geiger

April 18, 2015 MLS 6	Colorado Rapids	1–3	Seattle Sounders FC	Commerce City, Colorado
18:00 (PDT)	Torres 22'	Report	Neagle 5', 25'; Marshall (yellow card) 14'; Rose (yellow card) 66'; Martins 73'; Mears (yellow card) 74'	Stadium: Dick's Sporting Goods Park; Attendance: 13,134; Referee: Drew Fischer

April 26, 2015 MLS 7 Cascadia Cup	Seattle Sounders FC	1–0	Portland Timbers	Seattle, Washington
18:30 (PDT)	Pappa (yellow card) 53'; Alonso (yellow card) 54'; Dempsey 77'	Report	Villafaña (yellow card) 23'; Ridgewell (yellow card) 71'	Stadium: CenturyLink Field; Attendance: 41,451; Referee: Alan Kelly

May 3, 2015 MLS 8	New York City FC	1–3	Seattle Sounders FC	New York, New York
16:00 (PDT)	Watson-Siriboe (yellow card) 28', (red card) 88'; Diskerud (yellow card) 50'; Ballouchy 54'	Report	Martins 23', 66', (yellow card) 79'; Pappa (yellow card) 39'; Mears (yellow card) 44'; Dempsey 58'	Stadium: Yankee Stadium; Attendance: 25,384; Referee: Silviu Petrescu

May 9, 2015 MLS 9	Columbus Crew	3–2	Seattle Sounders FC	Columbus, Ohio
16:30 (PDT)	Kamara 10', 58'; Pogatetz (yellow card) 44'; Higuaín 49'; Schoenfeld (yellow card) 90+1'	Report	Dempsey 24', 75'; Pineda (yellow card) 77'	Stadium: Columbus Crew Stadium; Attendance: 16,714; Referee: Edvin Jurisevic

May 16, 2015 MLS 10 Cascadia Cup	Vancouver Whitecaps FC	0–2	Seattle Sounders FC	Vancouver, British Columbia
13:00 (PDT)	Laba (yellow card) 28'	Report	Barrett 5', 38'	Stadium: BC Place; Attendance: 21,000; Referee: Mark Geiger

May 23, 2015 MLS 11	Seattle Sounders FC	0–0	Sporting Kansas City	Seattle, Washington
16:00 (PDT)		Report	Ellis (yellow card) 81'; Mustivar (yellow card) 81'	Stadium: CenturyLink Field; Attendance: 40,653; Referee: Jair Marrufo

May 27, 2015 MLS 12	Seattle Sounders FC	1–0	Colorado Rapids	Seattle, Washington
19:00 (PDT)	Pappa 15'; Alonso (yellow card) 55'; Evans (yellow card) 64'	Report	Watts (yellow card) 44'	Stadium: CenturyLink Field; Attendance: 39,757; Referee: Ricardo Salazar

May 31, 2015 MLS 13	Seattle Sounders FC	2–1	New York Red Bulls	Seattle, Washington
14:00 (PDT)	Pappa 69'; Alonso (yellow card) 72'; Barrett 90+1'	Report	Sam 36', (yellow card) 60'; Perrinelle (yellow card) 59'; Felipe (yellow card) 67'	Stadium: CenturyLink Field; Attendance: 40,194; Referee: Jose Carlos Rivero

June 6, 2015 MLS 14	Sporting Kansas City	1–0	Seattle Sounders FC	Kansas City, Kansas
17:30 (PDT)	Feilhaber 84' (pen.)	Report	Frei (yellow card) 82'	Stadium: Sporting Park; Attendance: 21,505; Referee: Ismail Elfath

June 13, 2015 MLS 15	Seattle Sounders FC	3–0	FC Dallas	Seattle, Washington
19:00 (PDT)	Evans (yellow card) 50'; Neagle 55'; Martins 73'; González 90+2'	Report	Ulloa (yellow card) 49'; Pérez (yellow card) 85'	Stadium: CenturyLink Field; Attendance: 41,108; Referee: Alan Kelly

June 20, 2015 MLS 16 Heritage Cup	Seattle Sounders FC	0–2	San Jose Earthquakes	Seattle, Washington
13:00 (PDT)	Thomás (yellow card) 59'; Scott (yellow card) 87'	Report	Nyassi (yellow card) 23', (goal) 28'; Pérez García 73'	Stadium: CenturyLink Field; Attendance: 39,971; Referee: Juan Guzman

June 24, 2015 MLS 17	Philadelphia Union	1–0	Seattle Sounders FC	Chester, Pennsylvania
16:00 (PDT)	Sapong 69'	Report	Remick (yellow card) 30'; Scott (yellow card) 49'	Stadium: PPL Park; Attendance: 18,072; Referee: Edvin Jurisevic

June 28, 2015 MLS 18 Cascadia Cup	Portland Timbers	4–1	Seattle Sounders FC	Portland, Oregon
16:00 (PDT)	Nagbe 12'; Valeri (yellow card) 53'; Adi 74', 76'; Wallace 90+1'	Report	Pineda (yellow card) 17'; Neagle 38', (yellow card) 71'; Rose (yellow card) 52'	Stadium: Providence Park; Attendance: 21,144; Referee: Jair Marrufo

July 3, 2015 MLS 19	Seattle Sounders FC	1–0	D.C. United	Seattle, Washington
20:00 (PDT)	Scott (yellow card) 13'; Alonso (yellow card) 78'; Mears 88'; Neagle (yellow card) 90+1'	Report	Espíndola (red card) 27'; Doyle (yellow card) 58'; Kitchen (yellow card) 78'	Stadium: CenturyLink Field; Attendance: 40,410; Referee: Silviu Petrescu

July 11, 2015 MLS 20	Chicago Fire	1–0	Seattle Sounders FC	Bridgeview, Illinois
17:30 (PDT)	Cociș (yellow card) 82'; Adaílton (yellow card) 84'; Johnson 90+2'	Report	Craven (yellow card) 80'	Stadium: Toyota Park; Attendance: 18,528; Referee: Allen Chapman

July 18, 2015 MLS 21	Seattle Sounders FC	0–1	Colorado Rapids	Seattle, Washington
19:00 (PDT)	Friberg (yellow card) 30'; Mears (yellow card) 71'	Report	Pittinari (yellow card) 12'; Harrington (yellow card) 79'; Doyle 84'	Stadium: CenturyLink Field; Attendance: 40,403; Referee: Baldomero Toledo

July 25, 2015 MLS 22	Montreal Impact	1–0	Seattle Sounders FC	Montreal, Quebec
17:00 (PDT)	Ciman 88'; Donadel (yellow card) 90'; McInerney (yellow card) 90+3'	Report	Pineda (yellow card) 84'	Stadium: Saputo Stadium; Attendance: 17,209; Referee: Chris Penso

August 1, 2015 MLS 23 Cascadia Cup	Seattle Sounders FC	0–3	Vancouver Whitecaps FC	Seattle, Washington
19:00 (PDT)	Dempsey (yellow card) 53'; Alonso (yellow card) 74'	Report	Kah 6', 49'; Waston (yellow card) 67'; Morales 75'	Stadium: CenturyLink Field; Attendance: 53,125; Referee: Mark Geiger

August 9, 2015 MLS 24	LA Galaxy	3–1	Seattle Sounders FC	Carson, California
13:00 (PDT)	Zardes 13'; Keane 47' dos Santos 64'	Summary	Barrett 1'; Friberg (yellow card) 38'; Fisher (yellow card) 62'	Stadium: StubHub Center; Attendance: 27,000; Referee: Jair Marrufo

August 16, 2015 MLS 25	Seattle Sounders FC	4–0	Orlando City SC	Seattle, Washington
14:00 (PDT)	Martins 17', 52'; Valdez 62'; Thomás 90+2'	Report	Turner (yellow card) 23' (yellow-red card) 40'; Cerén (yellow card) 61'; Róchez (yellow card) 77'	Stadium: CenturyLink Field; Attendance: 40,453; Referee: Kevin Stott

August 22, 2015 MLS 26	Real Salt Lake	2–0	Seattle Sounders FC	Sandy, Utah
19:00 (PDT)	Morales 12' (pen.); Jaime 19'; García (yellow card) 83'; Beltran (yellow card) 90+2'	Report	Friberg (yellow card) 25'; Rose (yellow card) 39'; Fisher (yellow card) 50'	Stadium: Rio Tinto Stadium; Attendance: 20,559; Referee: Silviu Petrescu

August 30, 2015 MLS 27 Cascadia Cup	Seattle Sounders FC	2–1	Portland Timbers	Seattle, Washington
14:00 (PDT)	Martins 6'; Evans (yellow card) 24', (goal) 42' (pen.); Fisher (yellow card) 61'	Report	Ridgewell (yellow card) 44'; Jewsbury 58'; Valeri (yellow card) 69'; Asprilla (yellow card) 83'	Stadium: CenturyLink Field; Attendance: 64,358; Referee: Alan Kelly

September 5, 2015 MLS 28	Seattle Sounders FC	2–1	Toronto FC	Seattle, Washington
19:00 (PDT)	Martins 6'; Scott (yellow card) 19'; Alonso (yellow card) 30'; Dempsey 77'	Report	Zavaleta 59'; Delgado (yellow card) 68'	Stadium: CenturyLink Field; Attendance: 39,960; Referee: Ted Unkel

September 12, 2015 MLS 29 Heritage Cup	San Jose Earthquakes	1–1	Seattle Sounders FC	San Jose, California
19:30 (PDT)	Godoy (yellow card) 29'; Alashe (yellow card) 37', (goal) 70'	Report	Pineda (yellow card) 55'; Fisher (yellow card) 69'; Martins 82'	Stadium: Avaya Stadium; Attendance: 18,000; Referee: Jorge Gonzalez

September 19, 2015 MLS 30 Cascadia Cup	Vancouver Whitecaps FC	0–3	Seattle Sounders FC	Vancouver, British Columbia
16:00 (PDT)	Teibert (yellow card) 22'; Smith (yellow card) 63'; Watson (yellow card) 81'	Report	Evans (yellow card) 24'; Ivanschitz 45'; Pineda 71'; Martins 87'	Stadium: BC Place; Attendance: 21,000; Referee: Baldomero Toledo

September 27, 2015 MLS 31	Sporting Kansas City	1–1	Seattle Sounders FC	Kansas City, Kansas
14:00 (PDT)	Nagamura (yellow card) 44'; Dwyer 79'; Palmer-Brown (yellow card) 82'	Report	Martins 32'; Alonso (yellow card) 44'	Stadium: Sporting Park; Attendance: 19,496; Referee: Armando Villarreal

October 4, 2015 MLS 32	Seattle Sounders FC	1–1	LA Galaxy	Seattle, Washington
18:30 (PDT)	Barrett 90+3'	Report	Keane 36'	Stadium: CenturyLink Field; Attendance: 56,097; Referee: Jair Marrufo

October 18, 2015 MLS 33	Houston Dynamo	1–1	Seattle Sounders FC	Houston, Texas
14:00 (PDT)	Garrido (yellow card) 64'; Clark 65'	Report	Pineda (yellow card) 40'; Ivanschitz (yellow card) 55'; Barrett (yellow card) 71'; Martins 82'	Stadium: BBVA Compass Stadium; Attendance: 20,145; Referee: Edvin Jurisevic

October 25, 2015 MLS 34	Seattle Sounders FC	3–1	Real Salt Lake	Seattle, Washington
16:00 (PDT)	Dempsey 5', 20'; Pappa 10'	Report	Martínez (yellow card) 43'; Stertzer (yellow card) 55'; Gil 77'; Jaime (yellow card) 89'	Stadium: CenturyLink Field; Attendance: 55,435; Referee: Sorin Stoica

=== MLS Cup Playoffs ===
==== Knockout round ====
October 28, 2015	Seattle Sounders FC	3–2	LA Galaxy	Seattle, Washington
19:00 (PDT)	Dempsey 5'; Valdez 12'; Friberg 73'; Frei (yellow card) 90+3'	Report	Lletget 6'; Zardes 22'; Gonzalez (yellow card) 44'; Husidic (yellow card) 77'	Stadium: CenturyLink Field; Attendance: 39,537; Referee: Jair Marrufo

==== Conference semifinals ====
November 1, 2015 First leg	Seattle Sounders FC	2–1	FC Dallas	Seattle, Washington
18:30 PST	Ivanschitz 67'; Dempsey 86'	Report	Castillo 18'	Stadium: CenturyLink Field; Attendance: 39,599; Referee: Kevin Stott

November 8, 2015	FC Dallas	2–1 (a.e.t.) (4–2 p)	Seattle Sounders FC	Frisco, Texas
16:30 PST	Akindele 84'; Zimmerman 90+1'	Report	Marshall 90'	Stadium: Toyota Stadium; Attendance: 17,287; Referee: Baldomero Toledo
	Penalties
	Diaz (penalty scored); Hollingshead (penalty scored); Akindele (penalty scored); Zimmerman (penalty scored)		(penalty scored) Dempsey; (penalty missed) Ivanschitz; (penalty missed) Barrett; (penalty scored) Rose

FC Dallas win 4–2 on penalties after 3-3 aggregate and advance to Western Conference Finals.

=== U.S. Open Cup ===
June 16, 2015 Fourth round	Seattle Sounders FC (Washington (state))	1–3 (a.e.t.)	(Oregon) Portland Timbers	Tukwila, Washington
	Rose (yellow card) 20'; Evans (yellow card) 39' (yellow-red card) 69'; Martins 79'; Azira (red card) 113'; Dempsey (yellow card) 113' (red card) 114'	Report; Box Score	Valeri 48'; Paparatto (yellow card) 55'; Wallace 100'; Jewsbury (yellow card) 106'; Peay (yellow card) 111'; Urruti 116'	Stadium: Starfire Sports; Attendance: 4,022; Referee: Daniel Radford

=== CONCACAF Champions League ===
==== Group stage ====
Pos	Team	Pld	W	D	L	GF	GA	GD	Pts	Qualification
1	(United States) Seattle Sounders FC	4	2	1	1	6	3	+3	7	Knockout stage
2	(Honduras) Olimpia	4	2	0	2	3	3	0	6	
3	(Canada) Vancouver Whitecaps FC	4	1	1	2	2	5	−3	4	

Source: CONCACAF
Rules for classification: Group stage tiebreakers

August 5, 2015	Vancouver Whitecaps FC (Canada)	1–1	(United States) Seattle Sounders FC	Vancouver
19:00 (PDT)	Parker 61'	Report	Barrett (yellow card) 58'; Neagle 72'; Azira (yellow card) 73'	Stadium: BC Place; Attendance: 19,683; Referee: Jorge Isaac Rojas Castillo

August 19, 2015	Seattle Sounders FC (United States)	2–1	(Honduras) Olimpia	Seattle
19:00 (PDT)	Thomás (yellow card) 59'; Friberg 90'; Evans 90+7' (pen.) (yellow card) 90+8'	Report	Elis 5'; Quioto (yellow card) 49'; Mejía (yellow card) 50'; Peralta (yellow card) 58'; Alvarado (yellow card) 80'; Fabio de Souza (yellow card) 90+8'	Stadium: CenturyLink Field; Attendance: 37,106; Referee: Kimbett Ward

August 26, 2015	Olimpia (Honduras)	1–0	(United States) Seattle Sounders FC	Tegucigalpa
19:00 (PDT)	Elis 60'; Peralta (yellow card) 57'	Report	Thomás (yellow card) 49'; Pineda (yellow card) 64'	Stadium: National Stadium; Referee: Sandy Vasquez

September 23, 2015	Seattle Sounders FC (United States)	3–0	(Canada) Vancouver Whitecaps FC	Seattle
19:00 (PDT)	Neagle 32', 47'; Valdez 39'	Report		Stadium: CenturyLink Field; Attendance: 37,624; Referee: Fernando Guerrero Ramírez

=== Friendlies ===
March 24, 2015	Seattle Sounders FC (United States)	2–2	(Mexico) Club Tijuana	Seattle, Washington
7:23 p.m. PST	Neagle 11'; Rose 56'	Report	Moreno 21'; Ruiz 28'	Stadium: CenturyLink Field; Attendance: 39,115

== Transfers ==
For transfers in, dates listed are when Sounders FC officially signed the players to the roster. Transactions where only the rights to the players are acquired are not listed. For transfers out, dates listed are when Sounders FC officially removed the players from its roster, not when they signed with another club. If a player later signed with another club, his new club will be noted, but the date listed here remains the one when he was officially removed from Sounders FC roster.

=== In ===
No.	Pos.	Player	Transferred from	Fee/notes	Date	Source
80	FW	(United States) Victor Mansaray	(United States) Seattle Sounders FC Academy	Signed HGP deal	November 5, 2014	
21	DF	(United States) Jimmy Ockford	(United States) New York Cosmos	Return from loan at the end of 2014 NASL season	November 16, 2014	
22	DF	(United States) Eriq Zavaleta	(United States) Chivas USA	Return from loan at the end of 2014 MLS season	December 8, 2014	
4	DF	(England) Tyrone Mears	Free agent	Discovery Signing	December 29, 2014	
17	FW	(United States) Darwin Jones	(United States) Washington Huskies	Signed HGP deal	January 9, 2015	
1	GK	(United States) Troy Perkins	Free agent	Out of contract at Montreal Impact and was not selected during the 2014 Re-Entry Draft	January 13, 2015	
7	MF	(United States) Cristian Roldan	(United States) Washington Huskies	Generation adidas; 16th pick of the MLS SuperDraft	January 15, 2015	
99	FW	(United States) Andy Craven	(United States) North Carolina Tar Heels	Signed MLS college senior contract; 48th pick of the MLS SuperDraft	January 20, 2015	
13	DF	(Colombia) Andrés Correa	Free agent	Discovery Signing	February 10, 2015	
91	DF	(Jamaica) Oniel Fisher	(United States) New Mexico Lobos	40th pick of the MLS SuperDraft	March 17, 2015	
22	GK	(United States) Charlie Lyon	(United States) Marquette Golden Eagles	75th pick of the MLS SuperDraft	March 17, 2015	
18	MF	(Brazil) Thomás Jaguaribe	Discovery Signing		June 1, 2015	
28	MF	(Sweden) Erik Friberg	(Denmark) Esbjerg fB		July 29, 2015	
23	MF	(Austria) Andreas Ivanschitz	Discovery Signing	Free	August 4, 2015	
16	FW	(Paraguay) Nelson Haedo Valdez	Free Agent	Free, Signed as DP	August 7, 2015	
29	DF	(Panama) Román Torres	Discovery Signing	Targeted Allocation Money	August 12, 2015	

Seattle's first signing ahead of the 2015 season was the signing of 17-year-old Victor Mansaray to a Homegrown Player contract. In December 2014, English defender Tyrone Mears was added to the roster as a Discovery Signing; Mears had been a free agent since July when he was released by Bolton Wanderers following the 2013-14 English Championship season. Seattle added All-Pac-12 forward Darwin Jones from the Washington Huskies as a Homegrown Player on January 9, 2015.

==== Draft picks ====
Draft picks are not automatically signed to the team roster. Only those who are signed to a contract will be listed as transfers in. Only trades involving draft picks and executed after the start of 2015 MLS SuperDraft will be listed in the notes.

Date	Player	Number	Position	Previous club	Notes	Ref
January 15, 2015	(United States) Cristian Roldan (GA)	7	MF	(United States) Washington Huskies	MLS SuperDraft 1st Round Pick (#16); pick acquired from Real Salt Lake in exchange for pick #27 and allocation money	
January 15, 2015	(United States) Tyler Miller		GK	(United States) Northwestern Wildcats	MLS SuperDraft 2nd Round Pick (#33); pick acquired from New England Revolution in exchange for future considerations (the rights to Sean Okoli and allocation money)	
January 15, 2015	(Jamaica) Oniel Fisher		MF/DF	(United States) New Mexico Lobos	MLS SuperDraft 2nd Round Pick (#40)	
January 20, 2015	(United States) Andy Craven		FW	(United States) North Carolina Tar Heels	MLS SuperDraft 3rd Round Pick (#48)	
January 20, 2015	(United States) Charlie Lyon		GK	(United States) Marquette Golden Eagles	MLS SuperDraft 4th Round Pick (#75)	
January 20, 2015	(New Zealand) Andy Bevin		FW	(United States) West Virginia Mountaineers	MLS SuperDraft 4th Round Pick (#80)	

=== Out ===
No.	Pos.	Player	Transferred to	Fee/notes	Date	Source
26	DF	(Nigeria) Onyekachi Apam	Retired	Waived	December 4, 2014	
4	DF	(United States) Jalil Anibaba	(United States) Orlando City SC	Out of contract; selected in Expansion Draft	December 4, 2014	
7	FW	(United States) Tristan Bowen	(United States) New England Revolution	Waived; selected in Re-Entry Draft Stage 2	December 4, 2014	
29	GK	(United States) Josh Ford	(United States) Orlando City SC	Waived; selected in Re-Entry Draft Stage 2	December 4, 2014	
1	GK	(United States) Marcus Hahnemann	Retired	Waived	December 4, 2014	
13	FW	(United States) Sean Okoli	(United States) New England Revolution	Waived; rights along with allocation money traded for the 33rd pick in the 2015 MLS SuperDraft	December 4, 2014	
18	DF	(Mali) Djimi Traoré	Retired	Waived	December 4, 2014	
23	FW	(United States) Cam Weaver	Retired	Waived	December 4, 2014	
22	FW	(United States) Eriq Zavaleta	(Canada) Toronto FC	Waived; rights traded for a 2nd round pick in the 2016 MLS SuperDraft	December 4, 2014	
17	DF	(United States) DeAndre Yedlin	(England) Tottenham Hotspur	$4,000,000	December 23, 2014	
	FW	(United States) Andy Craven	(United States) Sounders 2		March 10, 2015	
	DF	(United States) Aaron Long	(United States) Sounders 2		March 14, 2015	
77	FW	(Martinique) Kévin Parsemain		Waived	March 20, 2015	
33	FW	(United States) Kenny Cooper	(Canada) Montreal Impact	Waived	April 2, 2015	

On August 13, 2014, it was confirmed that DeAndre Yedlin would be transferred to Tottenham Hotspur of the Premier League for a reported transfer fee of $4 million. Yedlin departed for the English club in January 2015.

== Recognition ==
MLS Player of the Week

Week	Player	Opponent	Ref
11	(United States) Chad Barrett	Vancouver Whitecaps FC	

MLS Goal of the Week

Week	Player	Opponent	Ref
1	(United States) Clint Dempsey	New England Revolution	
7	(Nigeria) Obafemi Martins	Colorado Rapids	
9	(Nigeria) Obafemi Martins	New York City FC	
13	(Guatemala) Marco Pappa	New York Red Bulls	

MLS Save of the Week

Week	Player	Opponent	Ref
9	(Switzerland) Stefan Frei	New York City FC	

MLS Team of the Week

Week	Player	Opponent	Ref
1	(United States) Clint Dempsey	New England Revolution	
1	(Nigeria) Obafemi Martins	New England Revolution	
1	(England) Tyrone Mears	New England Revolution	
5	(United States) Chad Marshall	Houston Dynamo	
7	(Switzerland) Stefan Frei	Colorado Rapids	
7	(United States) Lamar Neagle	Colorado Rapids	
9	(United States) Chad Marshall	New York City FC	
9	(Nigeria) Obafemi Martins	New York City FC	
9	(United States) Dylan Remick	New York City FC	
11	(United States) Chad Barrett	Vancouver Whitecaps FC	
13	(Guatemala) Marco Pappa	Colorado Rapids and New York Red Bulls	

== Kits ==
Home	Home Alt.	Home Alt. 2	Away	Third

Type	Shirt	Shorts	Socks	First appearance / Info
Home	Rave Green	Blue	Rave Green	March 8 vs. New England Revolution
Home Alt.	Rave Green	Rave Green	Blue	March 28 at FC Dallas
Home Alt. 2	Rave Green	Rave Green	Rave Green	June 24 at Philadelphia Union
Away	White	White	Black	May 9 at Columbus Crew
Third	Black	Light green	Light green	May 3 at New York City FC

== See also ==
- Seattle Sounders FC
- 2015 in American soccer
- 2015 Major League Soccer season
