= Milton Palacios =

Milton Palacios may refer to:

- Milton Palacios (footballer, born 1980), Honduran retired football centre-back
- Milton Palacios (footballer, born 1988), Honduran football defender
