= 2014 MLS Re-Entry Draft =

College draft for soccer teams

General information
- Date(s): Stage 1: December 12, 2014; Stage 2: December 18, 2014

Overview
- League: Major League Soccer
- Teams: 20

The two-stage 2014 MLS Re-Entry Draft took place on December 12, 2014 (Stage 1) and December 18, 2014 (Stage 2). All 20 Major League Soccer clubs were eligible to participate.

The priority order for the Re-Entry Draft was reverse order of finish in 2014, taking into account playoff performance. Unlike other 2014-15 offseason drafts, the 2015 expansion sides Orlando City SC and New York City FC were placed at the bottom of the selection order.

Available to all teams in Stage 1 of the Re-Entry draft were:

- Players who were at least 23 years old and had a minimum of three years experience in MLS whose options were not exercised by their clubs (available at option salary for 2015).
- Players who were at least 25 years old with a minimum of four years of MLS experience who were out of contract and whose club did not wish to re-sign them at their previous salary (available for at least their 2014 salary).
- Players who were at least 30 years old with a minimum of eight years of MLS experience who were out of contract and whose club did not wish to re-sign them (available for at least 105% of their 2014 salary).

Players who were not selected in Stage 1 of the Re-Entry Draft were made available in Stage 2. Clubs selecting players in Stage 2 were able to negotiate a new salary with the player. Players who remained unselected after Stage 2 were made available to any MLS club on a first-come, first-served basis.

Teams also had the option of passing on their selection.

== Available players ==
Players were required to meet age and service requirements to participate as stipulated by the terms of the MLS Collective Bargaining Agreement. The league released a list of all players available for the Re-Entry Draft on December 11, 2014. Eligible Players

Player	Position	Released By	Contract Status	Re-Entry Draft Result
Patrick Ianni	D	Chicago Fire	Option Declined	Not selected
Hunter Jumper	D	Chicago Fire	Option Declined	Not selected
Steven Kinney	D	Chicago Fire	Option Declined	Not selected
Sanna Nyassi	M	Chicago Fire	Option Declined	Selected by San Jose Earthquakes in Stage Two
Gonzalo Segares	D	Chicago Fire	Option Declined	Not selected
Bakary Soumaré	D	Chicago Fire	Option Declined	Selected by Montreal Impact in Stage Two
Carlos Borja	D	Chivas USA	Option Declined	Not selected
Marvin Chávez	M	Chivas USA	Out of Contract	Not selected
Oswaldo Minda	M	Chivas USA	Option Declined	Not selected
Martín Rivero	M	Chivas USA	Option Declined	Not selected
Nathan Sturgis	D	Chivas USA	Option Declined	Selected by Houston Dynamo in Stage Two
Daniel Paladini	M	Columbus Crew SC	Option Declined	Not selected
Davy Armstrong	M	Colorado Rapids	Option Declined	Not selected
Edson Buddle	F	Colorado Rapids	Option Declined	Not selected
Kamani Hill	F	Colorado Rapids	Option Declined	Not selected
Dimitry Imbongo	F	Colorado Rapids	Option Declined	Not selected
Brian Mullan	M	Colorado Rapids	Option Declined	Withdrew prior to draft
Marvell Wynne	D	Colorado Rapids	Option Declined	Selected by San Jose Earthquakes in Stage Two
Jair Benítez	D	FC Dallas	Option Declined	Not selected
Adam Moffat	M	FC Dallas	Option Declined	Not selected
Hendry Thomas	M	FC Dallas	Option Declined	Not selected
Nana Attakora	D	D.C. United	Option Declined	Not selected
Alex Caskey	M	D.C. United	Option Declined	Not selected
Jeff Parke	D	D.C. United	Option Declined	Not selected
Conor Shanosky	M	D.C. United	Option Declined	Not selected
Omar Cummings	F	Houston Dynamo	Option Declined	Not selected
Brian Ownby	F	Houston Dynamo	Option Declined	Not selected
Rafael Garcia	M	Los Angeles Galaxy	Option Declined	Not selected
Chandler Hoffman	F	Los Angeles Galaxy	Option Declined	Selected by Houston Dynamo in Stage Two
Brian Perk	GK	Los Angeles Galaxy	Option Declined	Not selected
James Riley	D	Los Angeles Galaxy	Option Declined	Not selected
Mamadou Danso	D	Montreal Impact	Out of Contract	Not selected
Matteo Ferrari	D	Montreal Impact	Option Declined	Not selected
Troy Perkins	GK	Montreal Impact	Out of Contract	Not selected
Andre Akpan	F	New England Revolution	Option Declined	Not selected
Shalrie Joseph	M	New England Revolution	Option Declined	Not selected
Stephen McCarthy	D	New England Revolution	Out of Contract	Not selected
Bobby Convey	M	New York Red Bulls	Option Declined	Not selected
Kosuke Kimura	D	New York Red Bulls	Option Declined	Not selected
Corben Bone	M	Philadelphia Union	Option Declined	Not selected
Fred	F	Philadelphia Union	Out of Contract	Not selected
Brian Carroll	M	Philadelphia Union	Out of Contract	Not selected
Kalif Alhassan	M	Portland Timbers	Option Declined	Not selected
Rauwshan McKenzie	D	Portland Timbers	Out of Contract	Not selected
Danny O'Rourke	D	Portland Timbers	Out of Contract	Not selected
Rich Balchan	D	Real Salt Lake	Option Declined	Not selected
Robbie Findley	F	Real Salt Lake	Option Declined	Selected by Toronto FC in Stage One
Aaron Maund	D	Real Salt Lake	Option Declined	Withdrew prior to draft
Tristan Bowen	F	Seattle Sounders FC	Option Declined	Selected by New England Revolution in Stage Two
Josh Ford	GK	Seattle Sounders FC	Option Declined	Selected by Orlando City SC in Stage Two
Marcus Hahnemann	GK	Seattle Sounders FC	Option Declined	Retired prior to draft
Jon Busch	GK	San Jose Earthquakes	Out of Contract	Not selected
Atiba Harris	F	San Jose Earthquakes	Out of Contract	Selected by FC Dallas in Stage Two
Josh Gardner	D	Sporting Kansas City	Option Declined	Not selected
Andy Gruenebaum	GK	Sporting Kansas City	Option Declined	Selected by San Jose Earthquakes in Stage One
Eric Kronberg	GK	Sporting Kansas City	Option Declined	Selected by Montreal Impact in Stage One
Dwayne De Rosario	M	Toronto FC	Option Declined	Not selected
Jeremy Hall	M	Toronto FC	Option Declined	Withdrew prior to Stage Two; subsequently traded to New England Revolution
Ryan Richter	D	Toronto FC	Option Declined	Not selected
Andrew Wiedeman	F	Toronto FC	Option Declined	Not selected
Carlyle Mitchell	D	Vancouver Whitecaps FC	Out of Contract	Withdrew prior to draft
Mauro Rosales	M	Vancouver Whitecaps FC	Option Declined	Withdrew prior to draft; re-signed with Vancouver prior to Stage Two

== Stage One ==
The first stage of the 2014 MLS Re-Entry Draft took place on December 12, 2014.

=== Round 1 ===
Pick #	Drafting Team	Player	Position	Former Team
1	Montreal Impact	Eric Kronberg	GK	Sporting Kansas City
2	San Jose Earthquakes	Andy Gruenebaum	GK	Sporting Kansas City
3	Colorado Rapids	Pass		
4	Chicago Fire	Pass		
5	Houston Dynamo	Pass		
6	Toronto FC	Robbie Findley	F	Real Salt Lake
7	Philadelphia Union	Pass		
8	Portland Timbers	Pass		
9	Sporting Kansas City	Pass		
10	Vancouver Whitecaps FC	Pass		
11	Columbus Crew SC	Pass		
12	FC Dallas	Pass		
13	Real Salt Lake	Pass		
14	D.C. United	Pass		
15	New York Red Bulls	Pass		
16	Seattle Sounders FC	Pass		
17	New England Revolution	Pass		
18	Los Angeles Galaxy	Pass		
19	New York City FC	Pass		
20	Orlando City SC	Pass		

=== Round 2 ===
Pick #	Drafting Team	Player	Position	Former Team
21	Montreal Impact	Pass		
22	San Jose Earthquakes	Pass		
23	Toronto FC	Pass		

== Stage Two ==
The second stage of the 2014 MLS Re-Entry Draft took place on December 18, 2014.

=== Round 1 ===
Pick #	Drafting Team	Player	Position	Former Team
1	Montreal Impact	Bakary Soumaré	DF	Chicago Fire
2	San Jose Earthquakes	Marvell Wynne	DF	Colorado Rapids
3	Colorado Rapids	Pass		
4	Chicago Fire	Pass		
5	Houston Dynamo	Chandler Hoffman	FW	LA Galaxy
6	Toronto FC	Pass		
7	Philadelphia Union	Pass		
8	Portland Timbers	Pass		
9	Sporting Kansas City	Pass		
10	Vancouver Whitecaps FC	Pass		
11	Columbus Crew SC	Pass		
12	FC Dallas	Atiba Harris	MF	San Jose Earthquakes
13	Real Salt Lake	Pass		
14	D.C. United	Pass		
15	New York Red Bulls	Pass		
16	Seattle Sounders FC	Pass		
17	New England Revolution	Tristan Bowen	FW	Seattle Sounders FC
18	Los Angeles Galaxy	Pass		
19	New York City FC	Pass		
20	Orlando City SC	Josh Ford	GK	Seattle Sounders FC

=== Round 2 ===
Pick #	Drafting Team	Player	Position	Former Team
21	Montreal Impact	Pass		
22	San Jose Earthquakes	Sanna Nyassi	MF	Chicago Fire
23	Houston Dynamo	Nathan Sturgis	MF	Chivas USA
24	FC Dallas	Pass		
25	New England Revolution	Pass		
26	Orlando City SC	Pass		

=== Round 3 ===
Pick #	Drafting Team	Player	Position	Former Team
27	San Jose Earthquakes	Pass		
28	Houston Dynamo	Pass		
