= Thomás Bedinelli =

Brazilian footballer

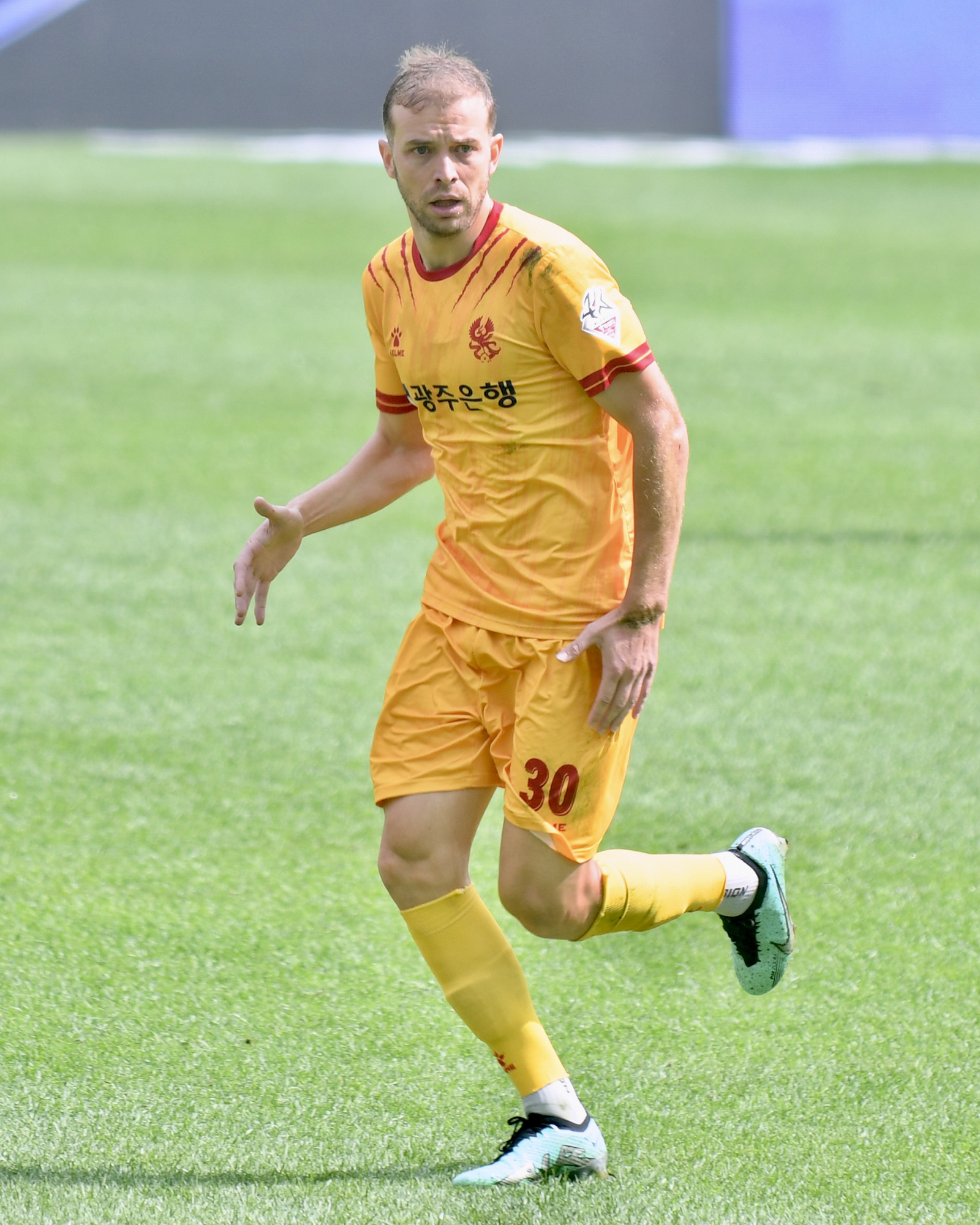
- Bedinelli in 2023

Personal information
- Full name: Thomás Jaguaribe Bedinelli
- Date of birth: 24 February 1993 (age 33)
- Place of birth: Juiz de Fora, Brazil
- Height: 1.79 m (5 ft 10 1/2 in)
- Position: Attacking midfielder

Team information
- Current team: Chapecoense
- Number: 30

Youth career
- 2006: Sport-MG
- 2006–2007: Roma
- 2007: Botafogo
- 2008–2013: Flamengo

Senior career*
Years	Team	Apps	(Gls)
2011–2016	Flamengo	19	(0)
2013–2014	→ Siena (loan)	12	(0)
2014–2015	→ Ponte Preta (loan)	13	(1)
2015	→ Seattle Sounders FC (loan)	11	(1)
2016	→ Joinvile (loan)	9	(0)
2017	Santa Cruz	1	(0)
2017–2018	Sport Recife	23	(3)
2018	Londrina	3	(0)
2018–2021	Apollon Smyrnis	76	(17)
2021–2022	Atromitos	19	(0)
2022	Chapecoense	15	(2)
2023	Gwangju FC	28	(2)
2024–	Chapecoense	39	(0)
- * Club domestic league appearances and goals as of 15 December 2025

Thomás Jaguaribe Bedinelli (born 24 February 1993), sometimes known as just Thomás, is a Brazilian professional footballer who plays as an attacking midfielder for Série B club Chapecoense.

== Career ==
Thomás' youth football career started with the Brazil club CFZ, then he went to the other hometown club Sport. He holds dual-citizenship and an Italian passport beside his Brazilian nationality. In 2006 Thomás arrived Italy to go through a trial period at Italian club Roma. After that he entered the youth team of Botafogo.

=== Flamengo ===
Thomás went into Flamengo's youth in 2008. In 2010, he became the champion of Campeonato Carioca de Juvenis with the team in an undefeated season and was the team's top scorer in the competition.

In 2011, selected by head coach Vanderlei Luxemburgo, Thomás entered Flamengo's senior squad, as well as earned his no. 25 jersey. He made his professional debut for Flamengo on 23 July 2011 against Ceará Sporting Club in Campeonato Brasileiro, and earned 9 appearances for Flamengo in Campeonato Brasileiro. In 2012, he changed his uniform to no. 20 and made 10 appearances in 2012 Campeonato Brasileiro season. On 16 March 2012, Thomás earned his first Copa Libertadores debut against Paraguayan club Olimpia Asunción at group stage, started the game and played 78 minutes. He played for Flamengo in 28 professional matches including 19 Campeonato Brasileiro appearances and nine more Campeonato Carioca games.

==== Siena (loan) ====
On 7 August 2013, Italian football club Siena announced that they made an agreement with Flamengo to loan Thomás for one year. He made 12 appearances for Siena in Serie B, as no. 10 of Siena. Then he came back to Brazil and re-registered into Flamengo's squad on 16 June 2014 but failed to get more opportunities under Vanderlei Luxemburgo.

==== Ponte Preta (loan) ====
On 19 August 2014, Globo reported that Campeonato Brasileiro Série B club Ponte Preta signed Thomás on loan from Flamengo until the end of season. Thomás made a total of 21 appearances for Ponte Preta, including 13 Série B matches in which he scored his only goal against Atlético Goianiense and 8 Campeonato Paulista matches. On 12 May 2015 he ended his loan and was back to Flamengo again.

==== Seattle Sounders (loan) ====
On 1 June 2015, the Major League Soccer club Seattle Sounders FC announced on their website that Thomás had finished his permanent transfer from Flamengo to the Sounders. Thomás made his debut for the Sounders on 7 June 2015, replacing Marco Pappa as a substitute on 80th minute during the road game against Sporting Kansas City which Sounders lost 0–1. On 15 August 2015 Thomás scored his first goal for the Sounders in their 4–0 win against Orlando City SC.

==== Joinville (loan) ====
During the 2015 offseason, Thomás was loaned to Joinville.

=== Other Brazilian Clubs ===
In January 2017 Santa Cruz signed Thomás.

On 1 June 2017, Thomás signed a one-year deal with Brazilian Série A club Sport, and after a year and half he signed as a free transfer with Brazilian Série B club Londrina.

=== Apollon Smyrnis ===
On 22 June 2018, Thomás signed a three-year deal with Super League club Apollon Smyrnis. On 16 December 2018, Thomás scored the only goal of the game in the 59th minute to clinch a long-awaited three-point haul for Babis Tennes’ team in a win game against Xanthi, who have now given their fans some hope in what has been a woeful campaign so far. It was the first win for the club in 2018–19 season in an ill-tempered Matchday 14 clash.

=== Atromitos ===
On 21 June 2021, Atromitos announced Thomás, having signed a two-year contract with the club.

=== Gwangju FC ===
For the 2023 season, Thomás has joined Gwangju FC of South Korean K League 1.

== Career statistics ==
As of 28 July 2021

Club	Season	League			Cup		Continental		State League		Total	
Club	Season	Division	Apps	Goals	Apps	Goals	Apps	Goals	Apps	Goals	Apps	Goals
Flamengo	2011	Série A	9	0	—		—		—		9	0
Flamengo	2012	Série A	10	0	0	0	2	0	6	0	18	0
Flamengo	2013	Série A	—		—		—		3	0	3	0
Flamengo	Total		19	0	0	0	2	0	18	0	39	0
Siena (loan)	2013–14	Serie B	12	0	0	0	—		—		12	0
Ponte Preta (loan)	2014	Série B	13	1	2	0	—		8	0	23	1
Seattle Sounders FC (loan)	2015	MLS	11	1	—		3	0	—		14	1
Joinvile (loan)	2016	Série B	9	0	—		—		5	0	14	0
Santa Cruz	2017	Série B	1	0	1	0	—		22	3	24	3
Sport Recife	2017	Série A	23	3	—		0	0	—		23	3
Apollon Smyrnis	2018–19	Super League Greece	24	2	3	3	—		—		27	5
Apollon Smyrnis	2019–20	Super League Greece 2	22	13	1	0	—		—		23	13
Apollon Smyrnis	2020–21	Super League Greece	30	2	2	0	—		—		32	2
Apollon Smyrnis	Total		76	17	6	3	—		—		82	20
Career total			164	25	9	3	5	0	53	3	231	31

== Honours ==
=== International ===
Brazil U-20

- 8 Nations International Tournament: 2012
