= Juan Niño =

Colombian-American footballer (born 1990)

Juan Fernando Niño
Personal information
- Full name: Juan Fernando Niño Perdomo
- Date of birth: 15 June 1990 (age 36)
- Place of birth: Bogotá, Colombia
- Height: 1.76 m (5 ft 9 in)
- Position: Midfielder

College career
Years	Team	Apps	(Gls)
2008–2011	Liberty Flames	74	(7)

Senior career*
Years	Team	Apps	(Gls)
2013–2014	Charlotte Eagles	1	(0)
2015–2016	Atlético Huila	29	(0)
2016	Barranquilla	10	(0)
2017	San Antonio FC	2	(0)
2017	FK Lovćen	16	(0)
2018	Oklahoma City Energy	0	(0)
- * Club domestic league appearances and goals as of 9 November 2017

Juan Fernando Niño Perdomo (born 15 June 1990) is a Colombian-American footballer who last played as a midfielder for Oklahoma City Energy in the USL.

== Career ==
=== College and amateur ===
Niño played four years of college soccer at Liberty University.

=== Professional career ===
Niño signed his first professional contract in 2013, signing for USL Pro club Charlotte Eagles.

Niño in 2015 will be a professional player for Atlético Huila in the Categoría Primera A, in Colombia.

Niño signed with San Antonio FC on February 16, 2017.
