= Danny Garcia (soccer, born 1993) =

American soccer player

Personal information
- Full name: Daniel Garcia
- Date of birth: October 14, 1993 (age 33)
- Place of birth: Dallas, Texas, United States
- Height: 1.65 m (5 ft 5 in)
- Position: Midfielder

Youth career
- 2009–2012: FC Dallas
- 2012: North Carolina Tar Heels

Senior career*
Years	Team	Apps	(Gls)
2013–2015	FC Dallas	4	(0)
2015	→ Arizona United (loan)	12	(0)
2016	San Antonio FC	25	(2)

International career^{‡}
2010–2011	United States U18	4	(0)
2012–2013	United States U20	17	(3)
Medal record
Representing United States
Runner-up	CONCACAF U-20 Championship	2013
- * Club domestic league appearances and goals as of October 5, 2016 ‡ National team caps and goals as of May 4, 2014

Daniel Garcia (born October 14, 1993) is an American soccer player.

== Career ==
=== Youth and college ===
Garcia began his career with the FC Dallas Academy. In 2012, he led Dallas to their first U17/U18 Development Academy title.

On February 8, 2012, it was announced that Garcia was one of nine players who signed a letter of intent to play college soccer at the University of North Carolina. In his freshman year, Garcia made 23 appearances and tallied four goals and six assists on his way to being named ACC Freshman of the Year. It would turn out to be his only season with the Tar Heels.

=== Professional ===
On June 18, 2013, Garcia signed a homegrown contract with MLS club FC Dallas, making him the 11th homegrown signing in club history. However, he wasn't eligible for player for Dallas in MLS competition until the 2014 season. He made his professional debut on May 4, 2014, in a 1–0 defeat to New York Red Bulls.

Garcia was loaned by FC Dallas to their United Soccer League (USL) affiliate Arizona United SC on April 27, 2015.

After his release from Dallas at the end of the season, Garcia signed with United Soccer League side San Antonio FC on February 11, 2016.

=== International ===
Garcia represented the United States in the under-18 and under-20 level, including the 2013 CONCACAF U-20 Championship and the 2013 FIFA U-20 World Cup.
