= Akwafei Ajeakwa =

American soccer player

Personal information
- Full name: Akwafei Singzoh Ajeakwa
- Date of birth: July 13, 1992 (age 34)
- Place of birth: Gardena, California, United States
- Height: 5 ft 8 in (1.73 m)
- Position: Forward

College career
Years	Team	Apps	(Gls)
2010–2011	Los Angeles Harbor Seahawks		
2012–2014	Chico State Wildcats	35	(11)

Senior career*
Years	Team	Apps	(Gls)
2015	Ventura County Fusion	5	(1)
2015	Biggleswade United	20	(11)
2016	Orange County Blues	24	(1)
2017	San Antonio FC	15	(3)
2017–2018	Colorado Springs Switchbacks	36	(5)
2019	Tulsa Roughnecks	19	(0)
2020	Los Angeles Force	2	(0)
- * Club domestic league appearances and goals as of October 8, 2023

Akwafei Singzoh Ajeakwa (born July 13, 1992) is an American soccer player.

== Career ==
Ajeakwa played college soccer at both Los Angeles Harbor College and Chico State University.

While at college, Ajeakwa also appeared for Premier Development League side Ventura County Fusion.

After a brief stint playing in the English lower leagues with Biggleswade United, Ajeakwa returned to the United States when he signed with United Soccer League side Orange County Blues.
