= Mark O'Ojong =

Cameroonian footballer

Personal information
- Full name: Mark Mkongho O'Ojong
- Date of birth: April 25, 1997 (age 29)
- Place of birth: Douala, Cameroon
- Height: 1.75 m (5 ft 9 in)
- Position: Midfielder

Senior career*
Years	Team	Apps	(Gls)
2015	Rainbow Bamenda		
2016	Seattle Sounders FC 2	26	(2)
2017	San Antonio FC	13	(2)
2019–2020	Bamboutos		
2021	AS Soliman	15	(1)
2022	Song Lam Nghe An	4	(0)
2023–	PWD Bamenda		

International career^{‡}
2013–2014	Cameroon U17		
2015–2016	Cameroon	4	(0)
- * Club domestic league appearances and goals as of 8 July 2023 ‡ National team caps and goals as of 8 July 2023

Mark Mkongho O'Ojong (born April 25, 1997) is a Cameroonian footballer who plays as a midfielder for PWD Bamenda.

== Career ==
O'Ojong began his career in 2015 with Rainbow Bamenda, where he played for one season. Since March 2015, O'Ojong plays for Seattle Sounders FC 2. He signed with USL side San Antonio FC on 28 April 2017.

In October 2019, O'Ojong joined Bamboutos FC in Cameroon.
