= Taylor Morgan =

English footballer

Personal information
- Full name: Taylor Lee Morgan
- Date of birth: 21 October 1990 (age 36)
- Place of birth: Southampton, England
- Position: Forward

Youth career
- 2000–2004: Southampton
- 2004–2006: Queens Park Rangers
- 2007–2009: English Schools Football Association

College career
Years	Team	Apps	(Gls)
2009	Central Connecticut Blue Devils		
2010–2012	George Mason Patriots	50	(23)

Senior career*
Years	Team	Apps	(Gls)
2010	Bradenton Academics	8	(3)
2012	Chicago Fire Premier	6	(3)
2013	Toronto FC	1	(0)
2013	→ Toronto FC II (loan)	1	(0)
2013–2016	Östersunds FK	19	(3)
2015	→ Falkirk (loan)	10	(0)
2015–2016	→ Airdrieonians (loan)	18	(2)
2016	Tulsa Roughnecks	13	(1)
2016	San Antonio FC	14	(0)
2017	Whitehawk	4	(0)
Total		94	(6)
- * Club domestic league appearances and goals

Taylor Lee Morgan (born 21 October 1990) is an English former footballer who played as a forward.

== Career ==
=== Early career ===
Taylor joined the Southampton academy at the age of 10 and remained there for four years before joining the Queens Park Rangers academy for two years. Morgan played for the English Schools' Football Association U18 side while he continued his education, before moving to the United States on a college scholarship through the Pass4Soccer Scholarships Agency. He spent his first year at Central Connecticut State University before transferring to George Mason University for his final three years. He finished with 23 goals and 7 assists in 50 appearances for the George Mason Patriots, including 13 goals in 19 matches as a senior to lead the Colonial Athletic Association. During his time at college, he also appeared for the Chicago Fire Premier of the USL Premier Development League.

=== Toronto FC ===
Morgan was signed by Toronto FC in the fourth round (58th overall) in the 2013 MLS Supplemental Draft. He joined the team for its 2013 pre-season training camp and officially signed with them on 1 March 2013. He then made his debut on 2 March 2013 in Toronto's MLS season opener against Vancouver Whitecaps at the BC Place Stadium, coming on as a 75th-minute substitute for Terry Dunfield. Morgan was released by Toronto on 14 May 2013, after making this one appearance.

=== Östersunds ===
Morgan signed with Swedish football club Östersund on 9 August 2013. He scored his first two goals for the club on 21 August 2013 against Vänersborgs IF in the Svenska Cupen in the 41st and 69th minutes of a 5–0 victory. He then scored his first two league goals on 14 September 2013 against Varbergs BolS in the 82nd and 87th minute, after coming on as a substitute match in a 3–0 victory. Morgan then scored his third goal for the club on 19 October against Ljungskile SK in the 90th minute of a 3–1 victory.

==== Falkirk (loan) ====
After the 2014 Superettan season concluded, Morgan signed with Scottish Championship side Falkirk on loan until the end of the season. He made his debut on 10 January 2015 against Hibernian, coming on as a substitute.

==== Airdrieonians (loan) ====
On 23 July 2015, Morgan moved on loan to Scottish League One club Airdrieonians, signing until January 2016. He made his debut for the club on 25 July 2015 in a Scottish Challenge Cup match against Annan Athletic. He started the match and played 75 minutes as Airdrieonians lost 3–1.

=== Tulsa Roughnecks ===
Morgan signed with the Tulsa Roughnecks of the United Soccer League in February 2016. He made his debut for the club on 26 March 2016 against RGV Toros, coming on as a 79th-minute substitute as Tulsa won 2–0. He scored his first goal for the club on 2 April in a 1–2 defeat against Swope Park Rangers.

=== San Antonio ===
Morgan signed for Tulsa's Texas rivals San Antonio on 22 June 2016, making his debut when he played the first 60 minutes in 0–0 home draw on 9 July against Oklahoma City Energy. He featured as a wide midfielder or lone forward in 13 further matches and was credited with his only assist for what was the winning goal after coming on as second-half substitute against Seattle Sounders FC 2 on 20 August 2016. He left the club at the end of the 2016 season and signed for National League South side Whitehawk on 23 March 2017.

== Personal ==
Taylor supports Arsenal, while his father and younger brother are season ticket holders of Queen's Park Rangers. Two weeks before being signed by Toronto FC, he went to a QPR game while back in the UK on holiday, not knowing at the time that he would be watching one of his soon-to-be coach Ryan Nelsen's final professional games as a player. Nelson subsequently left QPR to coach Toronto FC and signed Taylor the following month.

Taylor attended Hamble Community Sports College and Taunton's College in Southampton. While at George Mason University he studied psychology.

== Career statistics ==
As of 20 May 2016

Appearances and goals by club, season and competition
Club	Season	League			Cup		League Cup		Other		Total	
Club	Season	Division	Apps	Goals	Apps	Goals	Apps	Goals	Apps	Goals	Apps	Goals
Toronto FC	2013	MLS	1	0	0	0	0	0	—	—	1	0
Östersunds FK	2013	Superettan	9	3	1	2	—	—	—	—	10	5
Östersunds FK	2014	Superettan	10	0	1	1	—	—	—	—	11	1
Östersunds FK	Total		19	3	2	3	0	0	0	0	21	6
Falkirk (loan)	2014–15	Scottish Championship	10	0	4	0	0	0	0	0	14	0
Airdrieonians (loan)	2015–16	Scottish League One	18	2	2	2	2	0	1	0	23	4
Tulsa Roughnecks	2016	USL	9	1	0	0	—	—	—	—	9	1
Career total			57	6	8	5	2	0	1	0	68	11
