= Biko Bradnock-Brennan =

Irish-English footballer

Personal information
- Date of birth: 4 October 1992 (age 34)
- Place of birth: Cork, Ireland
- Height: 6 ft 3 in (1.91 m)
- Position: Defender

Youth career
- Fulham
- Blackpool

College career
Years	Team	Apps	(Gls)
2012–2015	Charlotte 49ers	61	(0)

Senior career*
Years	Team	Apps	(Gls)
2011	Blackpool	0	(0)
2011–2012	Harrow Borough		
2016	San Antonio FC	24	(0)
2017	Os TF	7	(0)
2017	Whitehawk	2	(0)
- * Club domestic league appearances and goals as of 13 November 2017

Biko Bradnock-Brennan (born 4 October 1992) is an Irish-English footballer who last played for National League South side Whitehawk.

== Career ==
Bradnock-Brennan played for Fulham FC under 16's. Bradnock-Brennan captained Blackpool youth side and played with their reserves. Bradnock-Brennan was released in 2011, moving to Harrow Borough. After a season with Harrow Borough, Bradnock-Brennan accepted a college soccer scholarship at the University of North Carolina at Charlotte in 2012. Whilst at Charlotte University was ranked 69 nationally by Top Draw Soccer in his Junior Year. Bradnock-Brennan earned National Honours Team of the Week and named one of the Top 10 defenders in college in the same year.

Bradnock-Brennan went undrafted in the 2016 MLS SuperDraft, later signing with United Soccer League side San Antonio FC.

After a short spell in Norway, Bradnock-Brennan signed for Brighton-based National League South side Whitehawk in November 2017 before leaving the next month.
