= Stephen McCarthy (soccer) =

American soccer player (born 1988)

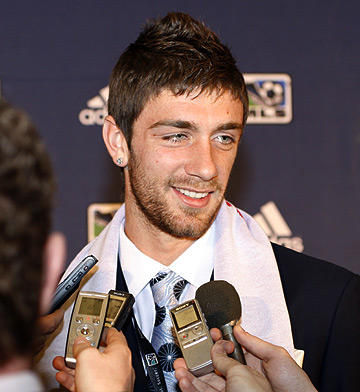
- McCarthy during the 2011 MLS SuperDraft

Personal information
- Full name: Stephen Michael McCarthy
- Date of birth: July 21, 1988 (age 38)
- Place of birth: Honolulu, Hawaii, U.S.
- Height: 6 ft 4 in (1.93 m)
- Position: Defender

Youth career
- 1999–2006: Dallas Texans

College career
Years	Team	Apps	(Gls)
2006–2008	Santa Clara Broncos		
2009–2010	North Carolina Tar Heels		

Senior career*
Years	Team	Apps	(Gls)
2009	DFW Tornados	10	(4)
2010	Carolina Dynamo	9	(4)
2011–2014	New England Revolution	69	(2)
2015	KuPS	10	(0)
2016–2018	San Antonio FC	51	(3)

International career^{‡}
2007	United States U18	3	(1)

Managerial career
- 2019: Incarnate Word Cardinals (assistant)
- * Club domestic league appearances and goals as of 17:34, 17 October 2018 (UTC) ‡ National team caps and goals as of November 1, 2013

Stephen Michael McCarthy (born July 21, 1988) is an American former professional soccer player who previously played for San Antonio FC.

== Career ==
=== Youth and college ===
McCarthy played youth soccer with the Dallas Texans 88'. Former teammates include Andre Akpan, Ross LaBauex, Jonathan Villanueva and Omar Gonzalez. This team also won three National Championships along with being the only American team to win the Dallas Cup Super Group. During that year both Manchester United and Real Madrid took part in the international tournament.

McCarthy attended Nolan Catholic High School in Fort Worth, Texas. During his senior year along with leading Nolan Catholic to a State Championship, he was also awarded the Texas Association of Private and Parochial Schools Division I Offensive Player of the Year. As well as being recognized as an All-State selection (2006).

McCarthy played college soccer at Santa Clara University, and later transferred to the University of North Carolina at Chapel Hill. He also played USL Premier Development League for the DFW Tornados and then the Carolina Dynamo in the following year.

=== Professional ===
McCarthy was drafted in the second round (24th overall) of the 2011 MLS SuperDraft by the New England Revolution on January 13, 2011. He made his professional debut on March 20, 2011, in the first match of the 2011 New England Revolution season, a 1–1 draw against the Los Angeles Galaxy, and made his home debut the following week. McCarthy scored his first professional goal on April 2 in a 1–1 tie with the Portland Timbers, and scored a game-winning goal against D.C. United on July 20. He recorded his first career assist on July 23, setting up Benny Feilhaber's 25th-minute goal in a 2–2 draw against the Colorado Rapids. In total McCarthy made 21 appearances (18 starts) in his rookie campaign, scoring two goals and notching an assist. During his Revolution tenure he would earn the nickname "Big Creepy Steve."

In the 2012 New England Revolution season, McCarthy transitioned to defense from his prior midfield role. He made 28 appearances (27 starts), recording an assist on May 2, setting up Saër Sène's 27th-minute goal against the Colorado Rapids. He received his first career red card on March 17, for a 14th minute tackle on Sporting Kansas City's C. J. Sapong. McCarthy was named Revolution Defender of the Year for the 2012 season.

In the 2013 New England Revolution season, McCarthy made 19 appearances (17 starts).

In the fourth round of the 2014 U.S. Open Cup, McCarthy scored an 8th-minute goal to help the Revolution advance passed the Richmond Kickers. He made only one appearance in the 2014 New England Revolution season, starting a July 19 1–0 loss to FC Dallas. In September he underwent knee surgery to repair a torn meniscus he suffered earlier in the month during a training session. At the end of the 2014 season McCarthy's contract expired.

In January 2015, McCarthy went on trial with Veikkausliiga club Kuopion Palloseura (KuPS). He ended up signing with the club and spent the 2015 season with the Finnish side.

On February 3, 2016, McCarthy signed with USL Championship club San Antonio FC ahead of its inaugural season. He was the second signing in club history. On June 21 McCarthy was named to the USL Championship Team of the Week after scoring a game-winning goal against Colorado Springs Switchbacks FC. The goal was the third of McCarthy's career. In December 2017, McCarthy signed a new contract with San Antonio. At the time of the singing, the 4,103 minutes played across all competitions by McCarthy for ranked second all-time by a player for the club since its inception.

McCarthy announced his retirement in November 2018. At the time of his retirement, McCarthy had tallied the second-most minutes in club history, recording 4,777 across all competitions, with over 57 total SAFC appearances. McCarthy scored three goals and recorded one assist overall with San Antonio, making 54 starts in 57 matches.

=== International ===
McCarthy represented the U.S. at the Under-20 level. In 2007, he played for the U.S. Under-18's at the Pan-American Games held in Rio de Janeiro, Brazil.
