= Victor Araujo =

Brazilian footballer (born 1991)

Personal information
- Full name: Victor Landim Araújo
- Date of birth: 25 June 1991 (age 35)
- Place of birth: Salvador, Brazil
- Height: 6 ft 0 in (1.83 m)
- Position: Attacking midfielder

Youth career
- Flamengo
- Vitória

College career
Years	Team	Apps	(Gls)
2013–2014	Trinity Tigers	42	(20)

Senior career*
Years	Team	Apps	(Gls)
2009–2011	R.R.F.C. Montegnée		
2011–2012	Eupen	8	(0)
2015	Ocean City Nor'easters	6	(1)
2016–2017	San Antonio FC	18	(1)
- * Club domestic league appearances and goals as of 17:03, 21 October 2017 (UTC)

Victor Landim Araújo (born 1991 June 25 in Salvador, Brazil) is a Brazilian footballer who plays as a midfielder.

== Career ==
Araujo moved from his native Brazil to Belgium, playing with R.R.F.C. Montegnée and Eupen, before moving to the United States, playing college soccer at Trinity University in 2013 and 2014.

Araujo played with Premier Development League side Ocean City Nor'easters in 2015.

Araujo signed with United Soccer League side San Antonio FC on 19 February 2016.
