= Miguel Salazar =

Mexican footballer (born 1994)

Personal information
- Date of birth: July 28, 1994 (age 32)
- Place of birth: Guanajuato, Mexico
- Height: 5 ft 8 in (1.73 m)
- Position: Defensive midfielder

Team information
- Current team: Midland-Odessa Sockers

Youth career
- 2010–2012: Real Salt Lake AZ

College career
Years	Team	Apps	(Gls)
2012–2015	Elon Phoenix	80	(3)

Senior career*
Years	Team	Apps	(Gls)
2014	Carolina Dynamo	7	(0)
2016–2017	San Antonio FC	25	(0)
2018	FC Tucson	16	(1)
2019–	Midland-Odessa Sockers	0	(0)
- * Club domestic league appearances and goals as of October 5, 2016

Miguel Salazar (born July 28, 1994) is a Mexican footballer who currently plays for Midland-Odessa Sockers FC in the National Premier Soccer League.

== Career ==
=== College ===
Salazar played four years of college soccer at Elon University between 2012 and 2015.

While at college, Salazar appeared for Premier Development League side Carolina Dynamo in 2014.

=== Professional ===
Salazar signed with United Soccer League side San Antonio FC on February 15, 2016.
