= Milton Palacios (footballer, born 1988) =

Honduran footballer

Personal information
- Full name: Milton Geovanny Palacios Wellington
- Date of birth: April 17, 1988 (age 38)
- Place of birth: Tegucigalpa, Honduras
- Height: 5 ft 7 in (1.70 m)
- Position: Defender

Youth career
- 2006–2007: CD Victoria (youth)

Senior career*
Years	Team	Apps	(Gls)
2007	Motagua		
2007–2008	Cagliari (under-20)		
2009–2010	Motagua		
2010–2011	Marathón	6	(1)
2011–2014	Deportivo Petapa		
2014	Heredia	18	(8)
2014	CSD Puerto San José		
2015	San Antonio Scorpions	14	(1)
2016	San Antonio FC	21	(2)
2016–2017	Vida		
2018	Audaz	18	(2)

International career
- Honduras U17
- Honduras U20
- * Club domestic league appearances and goals

Milton Geovanny Palacios Wellington (born April 17, 1988, in Tegucigalpa, Honduras) is a Honduran professional football player.

== Club career ==
=== Audaz ===
Palacios signed with Audaz of the Primera División for the Clausura 2018 tournament. With the side San Vicente, Palacios experienced a serious delay in the payment of salaries, he even filed a lawsuit against the club so that he was paid what he was owed. Later, the demand would be resolved with a mutual agreement.
