= Josh Ford =

American soccer player

Personal information
- Full name: Joshua Ford
- Date of birth: November 6, 1987 (age 38)
- Place of birth: Liverpool, New York, U.S.
- Height: 1.83 m (6 ft 0 in)
- Position: Goalkeeper

Team information
- Current team: Tacoma Defiance (assistant)

College career
Years	Team	Apps	(Gls)
2006–2010	Connecticut Huskies	85	(0)

Senior career*
Years	Team	Apps	(Gls)
2007–2008	Rhode Island Stingrays	21	(0)
2011–2014	Seattle Sounders FC	0	(0)
2014	→ Orange County Blues (loan)	2	(0)
2015	Orlando City SC	2	(0)
2015	→ Fort Lauderdale Strikers (loan)	16	(0)
2016	San Antonio FC	17	(0)

Managerial career
- 2016–: Tacoma Defiance (assistant)
- * Club domestic league appearances and goals

Joshua Ford (born November 6, 1987) is an American retired soccer player. He is currently an assistant coach for Tacoma Defiance of the USL Championship.

== Career ==
=== College and amateur ===
Ford attended the University of Connecticut where he set school records with 50 shutouts, 85 consecutive starts and 54 wins during his four years. He was also named Third Team All-Big East in 2007 and 2009, First Team All-Big East in 2010, First Team College Soccer News All-American and Big East Goalkeeper of the Year.

Ford spent two seasons with the Rhode Island Stingrays of the USL Premier Development League.

=== Professional ===
On January 18, 2011, Ford was selected in the first round (11th overall) of the 2011 MLS Supplemental Draft by Seattle Sounders FC. On March 9, Ford won the job as the number three goalkeeper for Seattle over Bryan Meredith. He was officially signed by Seattle on March 14, 2011.

After not making a single appearance for the Sounders, Ford was loaned to USL Pro club Orange County Blues FC. He made his professional debut on May 10, 2014, and assisted on a game-winning goal by Gibson Bardsley in a 1–0 away win over Oklahoma City Energy FC.

In December 2014, Seattle declined Ford's contract option for 2015 and he entered the 2014 MLS Re-Entry Draft. In stage two of the draft Ford was selected by the expansion side Orlando City SC.

On May 29, 2015, it was announced that Ford had joined the Ft. Lauderdale Strikers on a short-term loan.

In February 2016, Ford signed with United Soccer League club San Antonio FC, where he would also serve as team captain. He suffered a season-ending injury in August 2016. Ford retired from USL and began as an assistant coach with Tacoma Defiance. He worked with the team through 2022.

== Personal ==
Ford grew up in Liverpool, New York where he helped lead his school team to two state championship finals. Ford is the younger brother of Stanley Ford who also played college soccer at UConn.

== Career statistics ==
Club performance			League		Cup		Total	
Season	Club	League	Apps	Goals	Apps	Goals	Apps	Goals
USA			League		Open Cup		Total	
2007	Rhode Island Stingrays	USL Premier Development League	13	0	0	0	13	0
2008	Rhode Island Stingrays	USL Premier Development League	8	0	0	0	8	0
2011	Seattle Sounders FC	Major League Soccer	0	0	0	0	0	0
2012	Seattle Sounders FC	Major League Soccer	0	0	0	0	0	0
2013	Seattle Sounders FC	Major League Soccer	0	0	0	0	0	0
2014	Seattle Sounders FC	Major League Soccer	0	0	0	0	0	0
2014	Orange County Blues (loan)	USL Pro	1	0	0	0	1	0
Total	USA		22	0	0	0	22	0
Career total			22	0	0	0	22	0

Statistics accurate as of May 10, 2014
