= 2017 Associação Portuguesa de Desportos season =

Portuguesa
2017 season
- President: Alexandre Barros
- Coach: Mauro Fernandes
- Stadium: Canindé
- Série D: 4th (First stage)
- Paulista Série A2: 13th
- Copa do Brasil: 2nd round
Home colours	Away colours	Third colours

The 2017 season was Associação Portuguesa de Desportos' ninety fifth season in existence and the club's first consecutive season in the fourth level of Brazilian football.

== Players ==
=== Squad information ===
As of 29 June 2017

Name	Pos.	Nat.	Place of birth	Date of birth (age)	Club caps	Club goals	Signed from	Date signed	Fee	Contract End
Goalkeepers
Douglas Lima	GK	(Brazil)	Salvador (Bahia)	26 August 1992 (age 34)	17	0	Youth System	6 January 2012	Free	31 December 2018
João Lopes	GK	(Brazil)	Rio de Janeiro (Rio de Janeiro (state))	16 January 1996 (age 30)	0	0	Flamengo	19 January 2017	Free	19 January 2018
Iago	GK	(Brazil)	São Paulo (São Paulo (state))	16 April 1996 (age 30)	–	–	Youth System	2 January 2017	Free	31 December 2017
Ricardo Berna	GK	(Brazil)	São Paulo (São Paulo (state))	11 June 1979 (age 47)	24	0	Fortaleza	25 January 2017	Free	10 October 2017
Defenders
Everton Santana	CB	(Brazil)	São Paulo (São Paulo (state))	21 May 1995 (age 31)	25	0	Juventus-SP	2 January 2017	Free	10 October 2017
Gabriel Santos	CB	(Brazil)	Porto Alegre (Rio Grande do Sul)	5 March 1983 (age 43)	6	1	São Bento	29 April 2017	Free	10 May 2018
Rodolfo	CB	(Brazil)	Itaberá (São Paulo (state))	30 September 1992 (age 34)	–	–	Passo Fundo	28 June 2017	Free	10 May 2018
Alanderson	RB	(Brazil)	Rio de Janeiro (Rio de Janeiro (state))	11 March 1997 (age 29)	2	0	Youth System	20 May 2017	Free	1 May 2018
Bruno Oliveira	LB/CB	(Brazil)	Paiçandu (Paraná (state))	9 June 1996 (age 30)	9	1	Youth System	15 September 2015	Free	31 December 2018
Franklin	LB	(Brazil)	Fátima do Sul (Mato Grosso do Sul)	30 September 1992 (age 34)	–	–	Atibaia	28 June 2017	Free	10 May 2018
Paulo Fernando	RB	(Brazil)	Maceió (Alagoas)	3 August 1993 (age 33)	2	0	Bonsucesso	15 June 2017	Free	10 May 2018
Mateus Brunetti	LB	(Brazil)	São Paulo (São Paulo (state))	18 November 1999 (age 26)	–	–	Youth System	8 June 2017	Free	31 December 2018
Midfielders
Cleison	DM/RB	(Brazil)	Camaçari (Bahia)	7 July 1996 (age 30)	1	0	Youth System	28 January 2017	Free	1 August 2019
Dedé	DM	(Brazil)	São Paulo (São Paulo (state))	31 May 1987 (age 39)	2	0	Treze	15 June 2017	Free	10 September 2017
Dinho	DM	(Brazil)	São Paulo (São Paulo (state))	9 May 1984 (age 42)	26	0	Atlético Sorocaba	28 January 2017	Free	10 September 2017
Jonatas Paulista	DM	(Brazil)	São Paulo (São Paulo (state))	5 February 1994 (age 32)	3	0	Noroeste	10 May 2017	Free	10 May 2019
Vinicius	DM	(Brazil)	São Paulo (São Paulo (state))	30 April 1996 (age 30)	27	0	Youth System	14 May 2015	Free	31 December 2018
Marcelinho Paraíba	AM	(Brazil)	Campina Grande (Paraíba)	17 May 1975 (age 51)	6	0	Treze	3 May 2017	Free	15 May 2018
Forwards
Bruninho	SS	(Brazil)	Guarulhos (São Paulo (state))	9 January 1990 (age 36)	–	–	Parnahyba	17 May 2017	Free	10 September 2017
Bruno Duarte	ST	(Brazil)	São Paulo (São Paulo (state))	24 March 1996 (age 30)	16	2	Youth System	25 May 2016	Free	31 May 2018
Fernandinho	SS	(Brazil)	Cuiabá (Mato Grosso)	28 March 1992 (age 34)	6	1	Rio Claro	15 May 2017	Free	30 November 2018
Luizinho	SS	(Brazil)	São Paulo (São Paulo (state))	7 January 1996 (age 30)	22	4	Granada (Spain)	1 February 2017	Loan	10 October 2017
Luiz Thiago	ST	(Brazil)	Santos (São Paulo (state))	9 May 1995 (age 31)	2	1	Batatais	15 June 2017	Free	30 November 2018
Mateus Jesus	SS	(Brazil)	São Paulo (São Paulo (state))	11 January 1999 (age 27)	2	0	Youth System	16 June 2017	Free	31 December 2018
Matheus Alvarenga	SS	(Brazil)	São Paulo (São Paulo (state))	16 August 1999 (age 27)	–	–	Youth System	9 June 2017	Free	31 December 2017

Note: List of registered players according to FPF

=== Appearances and goals ===
Pos.	Nat	Name	Brasileiro Série D		Paulistão Série A2		Copa do Brasil		Copa Paulista		Total	
Pos.	Nat	Name	Apps	Goals	Apps	Goals	Apps	Goals	Apps	Goals	Apps	Goals
GK	(Brazil)	Douglas Lima	0	0	3	0	0	0	0	0	3	0
GK	(Brazil)	Iago	0	0	0	0	0	0	0	0	0	0
GK	(Brazil)	João Lopes	0	0	0	0	0	0	0	0	0	0
GK	(Brazil)	Ricardo Berna	6	0	16	0	2	0	0	0	24	0
DF	(Brazil)	Everton Santana	4+1	0	18	0	2	0	0	0	25	0
DF	(Brazil)	Gabriel Santos	6	1	0	0	0	0	0	0	6	1
DF	(Brazil)	Mateus Brunetti	0	0	0	0	0	0	0	0	0	0
DF	(Brazil)	Rodolfo	0	0	0	0	0	0	0	0	0	0
DF	(Brazil)	Alanderson	1+1	0	0	0	0	0	0	0	2	0
DF	(Brazil)	Bruno Oliveira	2	0	1+1	0	0	0	0	0	4	0
DF	(Brazil)	Franklin	0	0	0	0	0	0	0	0	0	0
DF	(Brazil)	Paulo Fernando	2	0	0	0	0	0	0	0	2	0
MF	(Brazil)	Cleison	0+1	0	0	0	0	0	0	0	1	0
MF	(Brazil)	Dedé	2	0	0	0	0	0	0	0	2	0
MF	(Brazil)	Dinho	6	0	18	0	2	0	0	0	26	0
MF	(Brazil)	Jonatas Paulista	2+1	0	0	0	0	0	0	0	3	0
MF	(Brazil)	Vinicius	0	0	0+3	0	0	0	0	0	3	0
MF	(Brazil)	Marcelinho Paraíba	6	0	0	0	0	0	0	0	6	0
FW	(Brazil)	Bruno Duarte	4+2	1	3+1	1	0	0	0	0	10	2
FW	(Brazil)	Fernandinho	4+2	1	0	0	0	0	0	0	6	1
FW	(Brazil)	Luizinho	4+1	1	14+1	3	2	0	0	0	22	4
FW	(Brazil)	Luiz Thiago	0+2	1	0	0	0	0	0	0	2	1
FW	(Brazil)	Mateus Jesus	0+2	0	0	0	0	0	0	0	2	0
FW	(Brazil)	Matheus Alvarenga	0	0	0	0	0	0	0	0	0	0
Players who left the club during the season
DF	(Argentina)	Lucas Basualdo	0	0	1+1	0	0	0	0	0	2	0
DF	(Brazil)	Vinicius Gouvea	2	0	18	2	2	0	0	0	22	2
DF	(Brazil)	Amaral	2+1	0	8	0	0	0	0	0	11	0
DF	(Brazil)	Bruno Santos	0	0	11+4	0	2	0	0	0	17	0
DF	(Brazil)	Rômulo	0	0	1+2	0	1	0	0	0	4	0
DF	(Brazil)	Thiago Feltri	4	0	18	0	1	0	0	0	23	0
MF	(Brazil)	Michel	0	0	7+1	0	2	0	0	0	10	0
MF	(Brazil)	Ronaldo	0	0	1+1	0	0	0	0	0	2	0
MF	(Brazil)	Sandro Silva	0	0	4+2	0	0	0	0	0	6	0
MF	(Brazil)	Tárik	3	0	12+2	1	1	0	0	0	18	1
MF	(Brazil)	Bruno Farias	0	0	3+2	0	1	0	0	0	6	0
MF	(Brazil)	Bruno Xavier	0	0	1+13	0	0+2	1	0	0	16	1
MF	(Argentina)	Mateo Bustos	0	0	8+1	0	1+1	0	0	0	11	0
MF	(Brazil)	Jonatan Lima	1+1	0	0	0	0	0	0	0	2	0
MF	(Brazil)	Leandro Domingues	4	0	9	4	0	0	0	0	13	4
FW	(Brazil)	Adilson	1+1	0	14+3	4	2	0	0	0	21	4
FW	(Brazil)	Bruno Silva	0	0	7+7	3	0+2	1	0	0	16	4
FW	(Brazil)	Cláudio	0+1	0	0	0	0	0	0	0	1	0
FW	(Brazil)	Danilo Mariotto	0	0	3+1	0	0	0	0	0	4	0
FW	(Brazil)	Rico	0+1	0	0+6	0	0	0	0	0	7	0
FW	(Brazil)	Rodolfo	0	0	3+2	0	0+1	0	0	0	6	0

Last updated: 29 June 2017
Source: Match reports in Competitive matches, Soccerway

=== Goalscorers ===
Ran	Pos	Nat	Name	Série D	Paulistão A2	Copa do Brasil	Copa Paulista	Total
1	FW	(Brazil)	Luizinho	1	3	0	0	4
1	MF	(Brazil)	Leandro Domingues	0	4	0	0	4
1	FW	(Brazil)	Adilson	0	4	0	0	4
1	FW	(Brazil)	Bruno Silva	0	3	1	0	4
3	FW	(Brazil)	Bruno Duarte	1	1	0	0	2
3	DF	(Brazil)	Vinicius Gouvea	0	2	0	0	2
4	DF	(Brazil)	Gabriel Santos	1	0	0	0	1
4	FW	(Brazil)	Fernandinho	1	0	0	0	1
4	FW	(Brazil)	Luiz Thiago	1	0	0	0	1
4	MF	(Brazil)	Tárik	0	1	0	0	1
4	MF	(Brazil)	Bruno Xavier	0	0	1	0	1
Total				5	18	2	0	25

Last updated: 5 June 2017
Source: Match reports in Competitive matches

=== Disciplinary record ===
Nat	Pos	Name	Série C			Copa do Brasil			Paulista A2			Copa Paulista			Total		
Nat	Pos	Name	Yellow card	(yellow card) (yellow-red card)	Red card	Yellow card	(yellow card) (yellow-red card)	Red card	Yellow card	(yellow card) (yellow-red card)	Red card	Yellow card	(yellow card) (yellow-red card)	Red card	Yellow card	(yellow card) (yellow-red card)	Red card
(Brazil)	MF	Dinho	2	0	0	2	0	0	4	0	0	0	0	0	8	0	0
(Brazil)	MF	Tárik	0	0	0	0	0	0	6	0	0	0	0	0	6	0	0
(Brazil)	DF	Vinicius Gouvea	1	1	0	0	0	0	3	0	0	0	0	0	4	1	0
(Brazil)	DF	Thiago Feltri	1	0	0	0	0	0	3	0	0	0	0	0	4	0	0
(Brazil)	FW	Bruno Silva	0	0	0	1	0	0	3	0	0	0	0	0	4	0	0
(Brazil)	DF	Everton Santana	0	0	0	0	0	0	3	1	0	0	0	0	3	1	0
(Brazil)	DF	Gabriel Santos	3	0	0	0	0	0	0	0	0	0	0	0	3	0	0
(Brazil)	MF	Leandro Domingues	1	0	0	0	0	0	2	0	0	0	0	0	3	0	0
(Brazil)	MF	Bruno Xavier	0	0	0	0	0	0	3	0	0	0	0	0	3	0	0
(Brazil)	MF	Fernando	0	0	0	0	0	0	3	0	0	0	0	0	3	0	0
(Brazil)	DF	Bruno Santos	0	0	0	1	0	0	2	0	0	0	0	0	3	0	0
(Brazil)	MF	Marcelinho Paraíba	2	0	0	0	0	0	0	0	0	0	0	0	2	0	0
(Brazil)	DF	Bruno Oliveira	1	0	0	0	0	0	0	0	0	1	0	0	2	0	0
(Brazil)	GK	Ricardo Berna	0	0	0	0	0	0	2	0	0	0	0	0	2	0	0
(Brazil)	MF	Michel	0	0	0	0	0	0	2	0	0	0	0	0	2	0	0
(Brazil)	FW	Rodolfo	0	0	0	0	0	0	1	1	0	0	0	0	1	1	0
(Brazil)	MF	Sandro Silva	0	0	0	0	0	0	1	0	1	0	0	0	1	0	1
(Brazil)	FW	Rico	0	0	0	0	0	0	1	0	1	0	0	0	1	0	1
(Brazil)	MF	Jonatan Lima	1	1	0	0	0	0	0	0	0	0	0	0	1	1	0
(Brazil)	DF	Alanderson	1	0	0	0	0	0	0	0	0	0	0	0	1	0	0
(Brazil)	MF	Dedé	1	0	0	0	0	0	0	0	0	0	0	0	1	0	0
(Brazil)	MF	Jonatas Paulista	1	0	0	0	0	0	0	0	0	0	0	0	1	0	0
(Brazil)	DF	Amaral	0	0	0	0	0	0	1	0	0	0	0	0	1	0	0
(Brazil)	DF	Rômulo	0	0	0	0	0	0	1	0	0	0	0	0	1	0	0
(Brazil)	FW	Luizinho	0	0	0	0	0	0	1	0	0	0	0	0	1	0	0
(Argentina)	MF	Mateo Bustos	0	0	0	1	0	0	0	0	0	0	0	0	1	0	0
TOTALS			15	2	0	5	0	0	44	2	2	0	0	0	64	4	2

As of 29 June 2017
Source: Match reports in Competitive matches (yellow card) = Number of bookings; (yellow card) (yellow-red card) = Number of sending offs after a second yellow card; (red card) = Number of sending offs by a direct red card.

== Managers ==
Name	Nat.	Place of birth	Date of birth (age)	Signed from	Date signed	Role	Departure	Manner	Contract End
Tuca Guimarães	(Brazil)	São Paulo (São Paulo (state))	12 April 1973 (age 53)	Figueirense	19 December 2016	Permanent	5 March 2017	Sacked	31 December 2017
Estevam Soares	(Brazil)	Cafelândia (São Paulo (state))	10 June 1956 (age 70)	Bragantino	5 March 2017	Permanent	30 May 2017	Sacked	31 December 2017
Mauro Fernandes	(Brazil)	Sete Lagoas (Minas Gerais)	3 August 1953 (age 73)	Treze	30 May 2017	Permanent			31 December 2017

== Transfers ==
=== In ===
No.	Pos.	Nat.	Name	Age	EU	Moving from	Type	Transfer window	Ends	Transfer fee	Source
	DF	(Brazil)	Bruno Santos	21	Non-EU	Figueirense	Loan	PS	2017	Free	
	DF	(Brazil)	Everton Santana	21	Non-EU	Juventus-SP	Transfer	PS	2017	Free	
	DF	(Argentina)	Lucas Basualdo	28	Non-EU	Independiente Rio Colorado (Argentina)	Transfer	PS	2017	Free	
	DF	(Brazil)	Rômulo	23	Non-EU	Criciúma	Loan	PS	2017	Free	
	FW	(Brazil)	Danilo Mariotto	20	Non-EU	Fluminense	Loan	PS	2017	Free	
	FW	(Brazil)	Adilson	29	Non-EU	Yangon United (Myanmar)	Transfer	PS	2017	Free	
	MF	(Brazil)	Bruno Farias	29	Non-EU	Marília	Transfer	PS	2017	Free	
	FW	(Brazil)	Rodolfo	23	Non-EU	Palmeiras	Loan	PS	2017	Free	
	DF	(Brazil)	Thiago Feltri	31	Non-EU	Tigres do Brasil	Transfer	PS	2017	Free	
	MF	(Brazil)	Sandro Silva	32	Non-EU	FC Seoul (South Korea)	Transfer	PS	2017	Free	
	MF	(Argentina)	Mateo Bustos	24	Non-EU	Rampla Juniors (Uruguay)	Transfer	PS	2017	Free	
	GK	(Brazil)	Ricardo Berna	37	Non-EU	Fortaleza	Transfer	PS	2017	Free	
	GK	(Brazil)	João Lopes	21	Non-EU	Flamengo	Transfer	PS	2018	Free	
	DF	(Brazil)	Vinicius Gouvea	26	Non-EU	Audax	Loan	PS	2017	Free	
	MF	(Brazil)	Dinho	32	Non-EU	Atlético Sorocaba	Transfer	PS	2017	Free	
	MF	(Brazil)	Michel	25	Non-EU	Nacional-SP	Transfer	PS	2017	Free	
	MF	(Brazil)	Tárik	23	Non-EU	Pusamania Borneo (Indonesia)	Transfer	PS	2017	Free	
	FW	(Brazil)	Bruno Silva	25	Non-EU	Botafogo-SP	Transfer	PS	2017	Free	
	FW	(Brazil)	Luizinho	21	Non-EU	Granada (Spain)	Loan	PS	2017	Free	
	MF	(Brazil)	Fernando	26	Non-EU	Anápolis	Transfer	PS	2017	Free	
	FW	(Brazil)	Rico	35	Non-EU	Hidd (Bahrain)	Transfer	DS	2017	Free	
		(Brazil)	Estevam Soares	60	Non-EU	Free agent	Job offer	DS	2017	Free	
	DF	(Brazil)	Amaral	29	Non-EU	Uniclinic	Transfer	DS	2017	Free	
	MF	(Brazil)	Leandro Domingues	33	Non-EU	Vitória	Transfer	DS	2017	Free	
	DF	(Brazil)	Gabriel Santos	34	Non-EU	São Bento	Transfer	DS	2017	Free	
	MF	(Brazil)	Marcelinho Paraíba	41	Non-EU	Treze	Transfer	DS	2017	Free	
	MF	(Brazil)	Jonatan Lima	25	Non-EU	Ituano	Loan	DS	2017	Free	
	MF	(Brazil)	Jonatan Paulista	23	Non-EU	Noroeste	Transfer	DS	2019	Free	
	FW	(Brazil)	Fernandinho	25	Non-EU	Rio Claro	Transfer	DS	2018	Free	
	FW	(Brazil)	Paulinho Le Petit	28	Non-EU	Batatais	Transfer	DS	2017	Free	
	FW	(Brazil)	Bruninho	27	Non-EU	Parnahyba	Transfer	DS	2017	Free	
	FW	(Brazil)	Guilherme Queiróz	26	Non-EU	São Bento	Transfer	DS	2017	Free	
	DF	(Brazil)	Paulo Fernando	23	Non-EU	Bonsucesso	Transfer	DS	2018	Free	
	MF	(Brazil)	Dedé	30	Non-EU	Treze	Transfer	DS	2017	Free	
	FW	(Brazil)	Luiz Thiago	22	Non-EU	Batatais	Transfer	DS	2018	Free	
	FW	(Brazil)	Cláudio	30	Non-EU	Paranoá	Transfer	DS	2017	Free	
	DF	(Brazil)	Rodolfo	24	Non-EU	Passo Fundo	Transfer	DS	2018	Free	
	DF	(Brazil)	Franklin	24	Non-EU	Atibaia	Transfer	DS	2018	Free	

Total spending: ▼ R$ 0.00

=== Out ===
No.	Pos.	Nat.	Name	Age	EU	Moving to	Type	Transfer window	Transfer fee	Source
	GK	(Brazil)	Pegorari	25	Non-EU	Linense	Contract expired	PS	Free	
	GK	(Brazil)	Raphael Alemão	28	Non-EU	Palmeiras	Loan return	PS	Free	
	DF	(Brazil)	Augusto	30	Non-EU	Tricordiano	Contract expired	PS	Free	
	DF	(Brazil)	Marcelo	23	Non-EU	Água Santa	Contract expired	PS	Free	
	DF	(Brazil)	Mateus Alves	32	Non-EU	Villa Nova	Contract expired	PS	Free	
	DF	(Brazil)	Anderson	24	Non-EU	Caldense	Contract expired	PS	Free	
	DF	(Brazil)	Denner	23	Non-EU	São Bento	Contract expired	PS	Free	
	DF	(Brazil)	Douglas Oliveira	24	Non-EU	Nacional-SP	Contract expired	PS	Free	
	MF	(Brazil)	Alê	30	Non-EU	Rio Claro	Contract expired	PS	Free	
	MF	(Brazil)	Dudu Vieira	24	Non-EU	Santo André	Loan return	PS	Free	
	MF	(Brazil)	Daniel Ferreira	25	Non-EU	Bragantino	Contract expired	PS	Free	
	MF	(Brazil)	Júnior Timbó	26	Non-EU	Juventus-SP	Contract expired	PS	Free	
	MF	(Brazil)	Michel Pires	27	Non-EU	Gama	Loan return	PS	Free	
	FW	(Brazil)	João Henrique	29	Non-EU	CRAC	Contract expired	PS	Free	
	FW	(Brazil)	John Lennon	24	Non-EU	ABC	Contract expired	PS	Free	
	FW	(Brazil)	Nunes	34	Non-EU	Brasiliense	Contract expired	PS	Free	
	FW	(Brazil)	Valdeci	21	Non-EU	Ferroviário	Loan ended	PS	Free	
	MF	(Brazil)	Vilson	20	Non-EU	Portuguesa Londrinense	Loan ended	PS	Free	
	FW	(Brazil)	Renato Kayser	20	Non-EU	Vasco da Gama	Loan return	PS	Free	
	DF	(Brazil)	Cesinha	22	Non-EU	Uberlândia	Released	PS	Free	
	MF	(Brazil)	Leonardo Aquino	21	Non-EU	Velo Clube	Released	PS	Free	
	FW	(Brazil)	Bruno Mineiro	33	Non-EU	Free agent	Released	PS	Free	
	FW	(Brazil)	Gileard	20	Non-EU	Maranhão	Loan ended	PS	Free	
		(Brazil)	Tuca Guimarães	43	Non-EU	Nacional-SP	Contract rescinded	DS	Free	
	DF	(Argentina)	Lucas Basualdo	29	Non-EU	Free agent	Released	DS	Free	
	DF	(Brazil)	Bruno Santos	21	Non-EU	Figueirense	Loan ended	DS	Free	
	DF	(Brazil)	Rômulo	23	Non-EU	Criciúma	Loan ended	DS	Free	
	MF	(Brazil)	Michel	25	Non-EU	Free agent	Released	DS	Free	
	MF	(Brazil)	Sandro Silva	32	Non-EU	Free agent	Released	DS	Free	
	MF	(Brazil)	Bruno Farias	29	Non-EU	Free agent	Released	DS	Free	
	MF	(Argentina)	Mateo Bustos	24	Non-EU	Free agent	Released	DS	Free	
	FW	(Brazil)	Bruno Silva	26	Non-EU	Free agent	Released	DS	Free	
	FW	(Brazil)	Danilo Mariotto	21	Non-EU	Fluminense	Loan ended	DS	Free	
	FW	(Brazil)	Rodolfo	23	Non-EU	Palmeiras	Loan ended	DS	Free	[=
	MF	(Brazil)	Bruno Xavier	20	Non-EU	Nacional-SP	Contract rescinded	DS	Free	
	MF	(Brazil)	Tárik	24	Non-EU	Free agent	Contract rescinded	DS	Free	
	DF	(Brazil)	Vinicius Gouvea	27	Non-EU	Free agent	Contract rescinded	DS	Free	
	DF	(Brazil)	Thiago Feltri	22	Non-EU	Free agent	Contract rescinded	DS	Free	
	MF	(Brazil)	Leandro Domingues	33	Non-EU	Free agent	Contract rescinded	DS	Free	
	MF	(Brazil)	Jonatan Lima	25	Non-EU	Free agent	Contract rescinded	DS	Free	
	DF	(Brazil)	Amaral	29	Non-EU	Free agent	Released	DS	Free	
	MF	(Brazil)	Fernando	27	Non-EU	Free agent	Released	DS	Free	
	MF	(Brazil)	Ronaldo	22	Non-EU	Free agent	Released	DS	Free	
	FW	(Brazil)	Adilson	30	Non-EU	Free agent	Released	DS	Free	
	FW	(Brazil)	Cláudio	30	Non-EU	Free agent	Released	DS	Free	
	FW	(Brazil)	Paulinho Le Petit	28	Non-EU	Free agent	Released	DS	Free	
	FW	(Brazil)	Rico	36	Non-EU	Free agent	Released	DS	Free	

Total gaining: ▲ R$ 0.00

Balance

R$ 0.00

== Competitions ==
=== Campeonato Brasileiro Série D ===
Pos	Team	Pld	W	D	L	GF	GA	GD	Pts
1	(Minas Gerais) Villa Nova	6	2	3	1	6	6	0	9
2	(Espírito Santo) Desportiva Ferroviária	6	2	2	2	5	5	0	8
3	(Rio de Janeiro (state)) Bangu	6	2	2	2	7	8	−1	8
4	(São Paulo (state)) Portuguesa (SP)	6	2	1	3	5	4	+1	7

Source: Soccerway

==== Matches ====
21 May 1	Portuguesa	1 – 0	Desportiva	São Paulo
19:00	Gabriel Santos 2'; Dinho (yellow card) 66'	Report	(yellow card) 76' Rodrigo Lacraia	Stadium: Canindé; Attendance: 674; Referee: Arilson Bispo da Anunciação

27 May 2	Bangu	1 – 0	Portuguesa	Rio de Janeiro
15:00	Bueno 2'; Camutanga (yellow card) 45'; Walter (yellow card) 54'; Hygor (yellow card) 87'	Report	(yellow card) 25' Jonatas Paulista; (yellow card) 48' Gabriel Santos; (yellow card) 51' (red card) 74' Vinicius Gouvea; (yellow card) 67' Thiago Feltri	Stadium: Moça Bonita; Attendance: 1,202; Referee: Osimar Moreira da Silva Júnior

4 June 3	Villa Nova	2 – 1	Portuguesa	Nova Lima
16:00	Gustavo Eugênio (yellow card) 8'; Bruno Moreno 16'; Edu Pina (yellow card) 18'; Douglas Oliveira (yellow card) 46'; Paulo Vitor (yellow card) 52'; Carrara 82'; Nequinha (yellow card) 87'	Report	(yellow card) 14' Gabriel Santos; 56' Bruno Duarte; (yellow card) 89' Alanderson; (yellow card) 90+2' Marcelinho Paraíba	Stadium: Castor Cifuentes; Referee: Breno Veira Souza

9 June 2017 4	Portuguesa	0 – 0	Villa Nova	São Paulo
19:00	Jonatan Lima (yellow card) 27' (yellow-red card); Leandro Domingues (yellow card) 69'	Report	(yellow card) 21' Gustavo; (yellow card) 69' Bruno Moreno; (yellow card) 78' Ceará; (red card) 84' Jhonathan Moc	Stadium: Canindé; Referee: Evandro Tiago Bender

17 June 2017 5	Portuguesa	3 – 0	Bangu	São Paulo
19:00	Luizinho 7'; Fernandinho 14'; Marcelinho Paraíba (yellow card) 68'; Luiz Thiago 90'	Report	(yellow card) 30' Rafael Henriques; (yellow card) 45+2' Bahia	Stadium: Estádio Oswaldo Teixeira Duarte; Attendance: 1,295; Referee: Marcelo Alves dos Santos

25 June 2017 6	Desportiva Ferroviária	1 – 0	Portuguesa	Cariacica
18:00	Edinho 4'; Rodrigo Lacraia (yellow card) 53' (yellow-red card)	Report	(yellow card) 32' Dedé; (yellow card) 76' Gabriel Santos; (yellow card) 81' Dinho; (yellow card) 84' Bruno Oliveira	Stadium: Estádio Engenheiro Araripe; Attendance: 2,142; Referee: Leo Simão Holanda

=== Campeonato Paulista Série A2 ===
Pos	Team	Pld	W	D	L	GF	GA	GD	Pts
11	Oeste	19	6	7	6	23	19	+4	25
12	XV de Piracicaba	19	5	10	4	25	22	+3	25
13	Portuguesa	19	7	2	10	18	24	−6	23
14	Votuporanguense	19	6	5	8	18	21	−3	23
15	Velo Clube	19	6	5	8	23	27	−4	23

Updated to match(es) played on 6 May 2017. Source: Soccerway
Rules for classification: 1) points; 2) goal difference; 3) number of goals scored.

==== Matches ====
29 January 1	Portuguesa	1 – 0	Barretos	São Paulo
10:00	Tárik (yellow card) 50'; Dinho (yellow card) 68'; Bruno Silva 90+3'	Report	(yellow card) 7' Samuel; (yellow card) 26' Danilo Sacramento	Stadium: Canindé; Referee: Raphael Claus

1 February 2	Batatais	1 – 0	Portuguesa	Bebedouro
16:00	Jackson Borges (yellow card) 39'; Elton (yellow card) 45+5'; Diego 74'	Report		Stadium: Sócrates Stamato; Attendance: 337; Referee: Rodrigo Guarizo Ferreira do Amaral

4 February 3	Velo Clube	2 – 0	Portuguesa	Rio Claro
19:00	Adriano 38'; Niander (yellow card) 49'; Leonardo Aquino 86'	Report	(yellow card) 26' (red card) 40' Rodolfo; (yellow card) 43' Tárik; (red card) 64' Sandro Silva; (yellow card) 90+1' Everton	Stadium: Benitão; Attendance: 1,539; Referee: Leandro Bizzio Marinho

7 February 5	Água Santa	0 – 0	Portuguesa	Diadema
16:00	Danielzinho (yellow card) 43'; Leandro Silva (yellow card) 58'; Rodrigo Sam (yellow card) 82'; Julinho (yellow card) 86'	Report	(yellow card) 33' Bruno Silva; (yellow card) 55' Michel; (yellow card) 61' Dinho; (yellow card) 77' Bruno Xavier; (yellow card) 90+3' Ricardo Berna	Stadium: Distrital do Inamar; Attendance: 1,112; Referee: Marcelo Aparecido Ribeiro de Souza

10 February 4	Portuguesa	1 – 0	Sertãozinho	São Paulo
19:15	Tárik (yellow card) 11'; Vinicius Gouvea (yellow card) 70'; Bruno Silva (yellow card) 88'; Adilson 89'	Report	(yellow card) 26' Felipe Manoel; (yellow card) 77' Dick; (yellow card) 88' Anderson Nequinha	Stadium: Canindé; Attendance: 1,142; Referee: Alessandro Darcie

19 February 6	Portuguesa	3 – 2	Mogi Mirim	São Caetano do Sul
16:00	Luizinho 4' 58'; Adilson 26'; Dinho (yellow card) 37'; Bruno Xavier (yellow card) 88'	Report	(yellow card) 8' Dedé; 38' (pen.) (yellow card) 45' Miguel; (yellow card) 49' Rodrigo Ferreira; 67' Elielton	Stadium: Anacleto Campanella; Attendance: 733; Referee: Douglas Marques das Flores

25 February 7	Taubaté	1 – 0	Portuguesa	Taubaté
19:00	Rychely (yellow card) 42'; Caique 57'; Rafael Tavares (yellow card) 81'	Report	(yellow card) 41' Thiago Feltri	Stadium: Joaquinzão; Attendance: 1,043; Referee: Adriano de Assis Miranda

1 March 8	Portuguesa	1 – 2	Votuporanguense	Osasco
20:00	Bruno Santos (yellow card) 35'; Luizinho (yellow card) 71'; Everton (yellow card) 86'; Bruno Silva 90+3'	Report	(yellow card) 47' (goal) 62' 67' Nathan; (yellow card) 52' Kleberson	Stadium: José Liberatti; Attendance: 264; Referee: Lucas Canetto Bellote

4 March 9	Capivariano	1 – 0	Portuguesa	Capivari
10:00	Carlos Henrique (yellow card) 39'; Neto 49'; Jeferson Deco (yellow card) 82'; João Victor (yellow card) 90+3'	Report	(yellow card) 77' Michel	Stadium: Arena Capivari; Attendance: 516; Referee: Leonardo Ferreira Lima

11 March 10	Bragantino	1 – 0	Portuguesa	Bragança Paulista
16:00	Grampola 16'; Adriano Paulista (yellow card) 40'; Bruno Oliveira (yellow card) 82'	Report	(yellow card) 20' Thiago Feltri; (yellow card) 40' Ricardo Berna; (yellow card) 46' Rico	Stadium: Nabi Abi Chedid; Attendance: 804; Referee: Rodrigo Gomes Paes Domingues

20 March 11	Portuguesa	2 – 1	Rio Claro	São Paulo
20:00	Bruno Silva 10' (pen.); Leandro Domingues 26'; Sandro Silva (yellow card) 34'; Thiago Feltri (yellow card) 77'; Everton (yellow card) 83' (red card) 88'	Report	4' Bueno; (yellow card) 8' Mendes; (yellow card) 57' Walter; (yellow card) 83' Alê	Stadium: Canindé; Attendance: 836; Referee: Thiago Luis Scarascati

23 March 12	Juventus	3 – 1	Portuguesa	São Paulo
15:00	Caihame 1' (yellow card) 19'; Vinicius Leandro (yellow card) 16'; Dener (yellow card) 62'; Leonardo (yellow card) 80' (goal) 81'; Jorge 88'; Judson (red card) 90+1'	Report	26' (yellow card) 90+1' Leandro Domingues; (yellow card) 27' Rômulo; (red card) 90+5' Rico	Stadium: Rua Javari; Attendance: 2,351; Referee: Aurélio Santana

26 March 13	Portuguesa	1 – 0	União Barbarense	São Paulo
16:00	Vinicius Gouvea 53'; Fernando (yellow card) 90+1'	Report	(yellow card) 50' Claudinei	Stadium: Canindé; Attendance: 1,042; Referee: José Cláudio Rocha Filho

29 March 14	Portuguesa	2 – 1	Penapolense	São Paulo
20:00	Amaral (yellow card) 43'; Fernando (yellow card) 46'; Adilson 58'; Tárik (yellow card) 87'; Dinho (yellow card) 89'; Leandro Domingues 90+2'	Report	(yellow card) 55' Carlos; 67' Gilvan	Stadium: Canindé; Referee: Alessandro Darcie

1 April 15	Rio Preto	1 – 2	Portuguesa	São José do Rio Preto
16:00	Melgarejo 24'; Gustavo Carbonieri (yellow card) 45'; Wangler (yellow card) 45+3'	Report	12' Adilson; 14' Tárik; (yellow card) 55' Fernando; (yellow card) 56' Bruno Santos; (yellow card) 85' Vinicius Gouvea	Stadium: Rio Pretão; Referee: Ilbert Estevam da Silva

9 April 16	Guarani	1 – 1	Portuguesa	Campinas
11:00	Auremir (yellow card) 53'; Fumagalli 90+2'	Report	21' Bruno Duarte; (yellow card) 23' Tárik	Stadium: Brinco de Ouro; Attendance: 12,067; Referee: Raphael Claus

12 April 17	Portuguesa	0 – 2	São Caetano	São Paulo
20:00	Leandro Domingues (yellow card) 30'; Bruno Xavier (yellow card) 82'	Report	(yellow card) 19' (goal) 45' Sandoval; 49' Carlão; (yellow card) 77' Esley; (yellow card) 81' Ermínio; (yellow card) 84' Eduardo Luiz	Stadium: Canindé; Attendance: 930; Referee: Vinicius Furlan

17 April 18	Portuguesa	2 – 3	Oeste	São Paulo
20:00	Vinicius 37' (yellow card) 37'; Tárik (yellow card) 60' Leandro Domingues 82' (pen.); Bruno Silva (yellow card) 85'	Report	9' Garutti; (yellow card) 64' Raphael Índio; 74' Mazinho; (yellow card) 84' Rodolfo; 90' Tatuí	Stadium: Canindé; Attendance: 687; Referee: Flávio Rodrigues de Souza

23 April 19	XV de Piracicaba	2 – 1	Portuguesa	Piracicaba
16:00	Doni (yellow card) 23'; Carlos Alberto 83' Rodrigo Fagundes 90' (yellow card) 90+1'; Gilsinho (yellow card) 90+1'; Bruninho (yellow card) 90+1'	Report	(yellow card) 39' Bruno Oliveira; 47' Luizinho	Stadium: Barão da Serra Negra; Attendance: 3,811; Referee: Vinicius Gonçalves Dias Araújo

=== Copa do Brasil ===
15 February 1	Uniclinic	1 – 2	Portuguesa	Horizonte
21:30	Airton Júnior (yellow card) 12'; Lincoln (yellow card) 34'; Edson Caríús 64' (pen.); Guidio (yellow card) 84'	Report	(yellow card) 20' Bruno Santos; (yellow card) 34' Bustos; 57' Bruno Xavier; 83' Bruno Silva; (yellow card) 88' Dinho	Stadium: Domingão; Attendance: 104; Referee: Eder Caxias Meneses

22 February 2	Portuguesa	0 – 2	Boavista-RJ	São Paulo
19:30	Dinho (yellow card) 65'; Bruno Silva (yellow card) 84'	Report	(yellow card) 60' Mosquito; 67' Vitor Faíska; (yellow card) 79' Maranhão; (yellow card) 80' Erick Flores; 90+3' Lucas Rocha	Stadium: Canindé; Attendance: 1,599; Referee: Emerson de Almeida Ferreira
