= 2018 Tulsa Roughnecks FC season =

Tulsa Roughnecks FC
2018 season
- Head Coach: Michael Nsien (Interim)
- Stadium: ONEOK Field; Tulsa, Oklahoma
- USL: Conference: 17th
- 2018 U.S. Open Cup: 2nd Round

The 2018 Tulsa Roughnecks FC season was the 4th season for Tulsa Roughnecks FC, now known as FC Tulsa, in the United Soccer League (USL), the second-tier professional soccer league in the United States and Canada.

== Club ==
As of June 18, 2018

No.	Position	Nation	Player
2	DF	CAN	Paris Gee
3	DF	CHI	Claudio Muñoz
4	DF	USA	Enrique Montano
5	DF	USA	Adrian Jusino
6	MF	MEX	Jonathan Levin
7	MF	GNB	Eti Tavares
8	FW	URU	Jhon Pírez
9	FW	USA	Michael Gamble
10	MF	ARG	Santiago Maidana
11	MF	SLV	Joaquin Rivas
12	GK	CHI	Fabián Cerda
14	DF	USA	Josh Morton
16	FW	USA	D.J. Dean
18	MF	SRB	Ivan Mirković
19	MF	SLV	Christian Rodriguez
24	MF	USA	Christian Thierjung
25	FW	MEX	Isaác Díaz
29	GK	USA	Chase Gentry
42	DF	CAN	Terence Smith
57	MF	USA	Alejandro Covarrubias
70	DF	CMR	Uzi Tayou
81	MF	USA	Brandon Servania (on loan from FC Dallas)
82	DF	SRB	Nemanja Vuković

Signed to first team contract with MLS affiliate Chicago Fire.

== Competitions ==
=== United Soccer League ===
==== Standings ====
Pos	Team	Pld	W	D	L	GF	GA	GD	Pts
13	Rio Grande Valley Toros	34	8	14	12	36	42	−6	38
14	LA Galaxy II	34	10	7	17	60	67	−7	37
15	Las Vegas Lights FC	34	8	7	19	50	74	−24	31
16	Seattle Sounders FC 2	34	6	7	21	40	71	−31	25
17	Tulsa Roughnecks	34	3	12	19	36	77	−41	21

Source: 2018 USL standings
Rules for classification: 1) total wins; 2) total goal differential; 3) total goals scored; 4) points earned against top four Conference finishers; 5) disciplinary points; 6) coin toss or drawing of lots

==== Match results ====
Win Draw Loss Upcoming fixture

Unless otherwise noted, all times in CDT

March 17 1	OKC Energy FC	1–0	Tulsa Roughnecks	Oklahoma City, Oklahoma
7:00 PM CDT	Atuahene 6'; Barril (yellow card) 45+2'; Siaj (yellow card) 89'	Report	Ugarte (yellow card) 39' (yellow-red card) 89'; Muñoz (yellow card) 50'; Rivas (yellow card) 83'; Maidana (yellow card) 90+1'	Stadium: Taft Stadium; Attendance: 6,757; Referee: Luis Guardia

March 24 2	Tulsa Roughnecks	2–3	Real Monarchs	Tulsa, Oklahoma
3:00 P.M.	Pírez (yellow card) 46'; Rivas 61', 83'; Mirković (yellow card) 65'; Lennon (yellow card) 69'; Gee (yellow card) 76'	Report	Baird 7', (yellow card) 48'; Hoffman 89'; Adams 90+1'	Stadium: ONEOK Field; Attendance: 5,203; Referee: Michael Cap

March 31 3	Tulsa Roughnecks	0–5	Orange County SC	Tulsa, Oklahoma
1:00 PM PDT	Montano (yellow card) 13'; Binns (red card) 26'; Cerda (yellow card) 31'; Rivas (yellow card) 37'; Arce (yellow card) 63'; Jusino (yellow card) 66'; Lennon (red card) 72'	Report	Enevoldsen 15', 29', 77'; Chaplow 19'; Powder (yellow card) 78'; Hashimoto (yellow card) 80'; Seaton 81'	Stadium: ONEOK Field; Attendance: 3,058; Referee: Rosendo Mendoza

April 4 4	Tulsa Roughnecks	0–0	Portland Timbers 2	Tulsa, Oklahoma
7:00 P.M.	Montano (yellow card) 38'; Maidana (yellow card) 83'; Arce (yellow card) 90+4'	Report	Arboleda (yellow card) 42'; Williamson (yellow card) 81'	Stadium: ONEOK Field; Attendance: 2,432; Referee: Alejandro Mariscal

April 18 5	Fresno FC	2–2	Tulsa Roughnecks	Fresno, California
9:00 P.M.	Ribeiro 27'; Argueta 77', (yellow card) 81'; Del Campo (red card) 81'; Reynish (yellow card) 90+2'; Rodolfo (yellow card) 90+4'	Report	Gee 55'; Muñoz (red card) 81'; Mirković (yellow card) 87'; Bakero 90+5'	Stadium: Chukchansi Park; Attendance: 3,718; Referee: David Barrie

April 28 6	Sacramento Republic FC	1–1	Tulsa Roughnecks	Sacramento, California
9:30 P.M.	Seiler (yellow card) 45+2'; Gomez (yellow card) 45+6'; Vazquez 89'	Report	Rivas 2'; Jusino (yellow card) 31'; Mirković (yellow card) 58'	Stadium: Papa Murphy's Park; Attendance: 11,569; Referee: Victor Rivas

May 5 7	Las Vegas Lights FC	1–1	Tulsa Roughnecks	Las Vegas, Nevada
10:00 P.M.	Alvarez 15'; Portugal (yellow card) 53'; Huiqui (yellow card) 66'; Thomas (red card) 72'; Ricardo Ferriño (yellow card) 77'	Report	Rivas 44'; Lennon (yellow card) 80'; Tavares (yellow card) 85'	Stadium: Cashman Field; Attendance: 7,777; Referee: Joseph Dickerson

May 9 8	Tulsa Roughnecks	1–1	Reno 1868 FC	Tulsa, Oklahoma
	Gamble 43'	Report	Carroll (yellow card) 26'; Mfeka 70'	Stadium: ONEOK Field; Attendance: 2,311; Referee: Rubiel Vazquez

May 12 9	Tulsa Roughnecks	1–5	Phoenix Rising FC	Tulsa, Oklahoma
5:00pm	Arce 11' (pen.) (yellow card) 23'; Jusino (yellow card) 36'; Gamble (yellow card) 41'; Vukovic (yellow card) 81'	Report	Drogba 4', 69'; Lambert 66' (yellow card) 73'; Wakasa 80'; Cortez 87'	Stadium: ONEOK Field; Attendance: 3,586; Referee: Matt Franz

May 19 10	San Antonio FC	1–1	Tulsa Roughnecks	San Antonio, Texas
7:30 P.M.	Gordon 7'; Felix (yellow card) 69'	Report	Jusino (yellow card) 47'; Rivas 51'	Stadium: Toyota Field; Attendance: 7,502; Referee: Ramy Touchan

May 26 11	Tulsa Roughnecks	1–1	OKC Energy FC	Tulsa, Oklahoma
7:00 P.M.	Mirković (yellow card) 11'; Rivas 16', (yellow card) 87'; Jusino (yellow card) 41'	Report	Volesky 1'; Ibeagha (yellow card) 76'	Stadium: ONEOK Field; Attendance: 3,366; Referee: Elvis Osmanovic

June 2 12	LA Galaxy II	1–0	Tulsa Roughnecks	Carson, California
19:30	Aguilar 6'; Büscher (yellow card) 30' (yellow-red card) 77'; Zubak (yellow card) 32'; Hernandez (yellow card) 69'; Llanez (yellow card) 88'	Report	Levin (yellow card) 34'; Ugarte (yellow card) 83'	Stadium: StubHub Center; Attendance: 594; Referee: Mark Allatin

June 9 13	Tulsa Roughnecks	3–0	Saint Louis FC	Tulsa, Oklahoma
7:30 P.M.	Pírez (yellow card) 22'; Jusino (yellow card) 61'	Report	Greig 17'; Calistri 59', 68'	Stadium: ONEOK Field; Attendance: 2,543; Referee: Ismir Pekmic

June 16 14	Phoenix Rising FC	3–0	Tulsa Roughnecks	Scottsdale, Arizona
9:30 P.M.	Cortez 38'; Johnson 42' (yellow card) 43'; Musa (yellow card) 57'; Farrell (yellow card) 78'; Frater 89'; Waldrep (yellow card) 90+1'	Report	Pírez (yellow card) 30' (red card) 45+1'; Ugarte (yellow card) 60'; Cerda (yellow card) 73'	Stadium: Phoenix Rising FC Soccer Complex; Attendance: 6,273; Referee: Michael Radchuk

June 23 15	Orange County SC	6–1	Tulsa Roughnecks	Irvine, California
9:00 P.M.	Hooiveld 16'; Enevoldsen 37'; Crognale 61'; Quinn 66' (pen.); Duke (yellow card) 69'; Czornomaz (yellow card) 84'; Pineda 86'; Bjurman 90'	Report	Levin (yellow card) 27'; Bakero 58'	Stadium: Championship Soccer Stadium; Attendance: 3,046; Referee: Ceciah Valero

June 27 16	Tulsa Roughnecks	2–0	LA Galaxy II	Tulsa, Oklahoma
7:30 P.M.	Mirković (yellow card) 26'; Pírez 40'; Rivas (yellow card) 43'; Gee 52'; Levin (yellow card) 83'	Report	Büscher (yellow card) 44'; Arellano (red card) 46'; Requejo (yellow card) 65'	Stadium: ONEOK Field; Attendance: 3,124; Referee: Fotis Bazakos

June 30 17	Tulsa Roughnecks	2–2	Las Vegas Lights FC	Tulsa, Oklahoma
7:30 P.M.	Rivas 4' (pen.); Cerda (yellow card) 49'; Morton 63'; Pírez (yellow card) 74'	Report	Avila (yellow card) 3'; Mendiola 34'; Kobayashi 49' (pen.); Jaime (yellow card) 70'	Stadium: ONEOK Field; Attendance: 3,431; Referee: Guido Gonzalez, Jr.

July 7 18	Rio Grande Valley FC Toros	1–1	Tulsa Roughnecks	Edinburg, Texas
7:30 P.M.	Enríquez 75'; Sullivan (yellow card) 83'	Report	Ferreira (yellow card) 74'; Gee 77'; Pirez (yellow card) 86'	Stadium: H-E-B Park; Attendance: 3,098; Referee: Elton García

July 21 19	Colorado Springs Switchbacks FC	4–2	Tulsa Roughnecks	Colorado Springs, Colorado
8:00 P.M.	Maybin 40', 70'; Burt 45' (pen.); Malcolm 87'	Report	Rivas 19'; Mirković (yellow card) 42'; Cerda (yellow card) 44'; Ceus 79' (o.g.); Ugarte (yellow card) 82'	Stadium: Weidner Field; Attendance: 4,029; Referee: Marco Villa

July 28 20	Tulsa Roughnecks	1–1	Fresno FC	Tulsa, Oklahoma
7:00 P.M.	Mirković (yellow card) 37'; Díaz 90', (yellow card) 90'; Gamble (yellow card) 90+4'	Report	Ellis-Hayden (yellow card) 14'; Daly (yellow card) 48'; Servania 63' (o.g.); Cuevas (yellow card) 83'	Stadium: ONEOK Field; Attendance: 3,194; Referee: José Lara

August 8 21	Tulsa Roughnecks	0–3	OKC Energy FC	Tulsa, Oklahoma
7:30 P.M.	Rivas (yellow card) 57'; Vukovic (yellow card) 57'	Report	Jahn (yellow card) 42', (goal) 45'; Volesky 49'; Ross (yellow card) 72'; R. Dixon 79' (pen.)	Stadium: ONEOK Field; Attendance: 2,805; Referee: Marcos de Oliveira

August 11 22	Tulsa Roughnecks	2–1	Colorado Springs Switchbacks FC	Tulsa, Oklahoma
7:30 P.M.	Vukovic (yellow card) 17'; Gamble 55'; Rivas 71'	Report	Schweitzer (yellow card) 36'; Hunter 45'	Stadium: ONEOK Field; Attendance: 3,328; Referee: Michael Radchuk

August 18 23	Real Monarchs	3–2	Tulsa Roughnecks	Herriman, Utah
9:00 P.M.	Hoffman 12', 35'; Plewa (yellow card) 69'; Portillo 86' (pen.); Mare (yellow card) 90+2'	Report	Covarrubius (yellow card) 44'; Ferreira 55' del Grecco (yellow card) 56'; Tavares 83'; Cerda (yellow card) 85'	Stadium: Zions Bank Stadium; Attendance: 1,404; Referee: Elton García

August 25 24	Saint Louis FC	3–2	Tulsa Roughnecks	Fenton, Missouri
7:30 PM (CDT	Fall 4', 56' (pen.); Hilton 14'	Report	Ferreira 29', 90+3'; Mirković (yellow card) 67'	Stadium: Toyota Stadium; Attendance: 4,150; Referee: Jon Freemon

August 29 25	Swope Park Rangers	2–1	Tulsa Roughnecks	Kansas City, Kansas
19:30 (CDT)	Kuzain 27'; Maher (yellow card) 32'; Barry (yellow card) 45+1', (goal) 79'; Lindsey (yellow card) 60'; Smith (yellow card) 75'; Vanacore-Decker (yellow card) 90'	Report	Gamble 15'; Vukovic (yellow card) 52'; Morton (yellow card) 65'; Tavares (yellow card) 70'	Stadium: Children's Mercy Park; Attendance: 458; Referee: Jonathan Bilinski

September 5 26	Seattle Sounders FC 2	4–4	Tulsa Roughnecks	Tacoma, Washington
9:00 P.M.	Neagle 45+1' (pen.); Wingo 59'; Estrada 82'; Ulysse (yellow card) 87'; Hopeau 90+4'	Report	Ferreira 16', 54', 56', (yellow card) 90'; Rivas 39' (pen.), (yellow card) 77'; Cerda (yellow card) 85'	Stadium: Cheney Stadium; Attendance: 2,465; Referee: Mark Allatin

September 9 27	Portland Timbers 2	4–0	Tulsa Roughnecks	Portland, Oregon
4:00 P.M.	Tuiloma 12'; Loría 24'; Barmby 45+3' (yellow card) 55'; Arboleda 84' (Asprilla)	Report		Stadium: Providence Park; Attendance: 3,445; Referee: Alejandro Mariscal

September 15 28	Tulsa Roughnecks FC	2–1	San Antonio FC	Tulsa, Oklahoma
7:00 p.m. CDT	Vukovic 37' (pen.); Mirković (yellow card) 45+3'; Tavares 57'; Tayou (yellow card) 90+7'	Report	Elizondo 18'; Gordon (yellow card) 90+7'	Stadium: ONEOK Field; Attendance: 2,877; Referee: Eric Tattersall

September 19 29	Tulsa Roughnecks FC	1–4	Sacramento Republic FC	Tulsa, Oklahoma
	Vukovic 62' (pen.)	Report	Hord 20'; Partain 54', 80'; Iwasa 68'	Stadium: ONEOK Field; Referee: Rubiel Vazquez

September 22 30	Tulsa Roughnecks FC	1–1	Swope Park Rangers	Tulsa, Oklahoma
19:00 (CDT)	Rivas 68'; Morton (yellow card) 86'	Report	Barry 44'; Silva (yellow card) 67'; Minter (yellow card) 90+2'	Stadium: ONEOK Field; Attendance: 3,422; Referee: Elvis Osmanovic

September 29 31	Reno 1868 FC	2–0	Tulsa Roughnecks FC	Reno, Nevada
9:00 PM	Brown 26'; Carroll 31'	Report	Mirković (yellow card) 23'; Servania (yellow card) 81'; Cerda (yellow card) 87'	Stadium: Greater Nevada Field; Attendance: 4,690; Referee: Greg Dopka

October 6 32	Tulsa Roughnecks FC	1–2	Rio Grande Valley FC Toros	Tulsa, Oklahoma
7:00 P.M.	Rivas 60'; Vukovic (yellow card) 85'	Report	Perea 51'; Small 53'	Stadium: ONEOK Field; Attendance: 2,766; Referee: Danielle Chesky

October 10 33	Saint Louis FC	1–0	Tulsa Roughnecks	Fenton, Missouri
7:00 PM CDT	Hertzog 14'; Kavita (yellow card) 90+2'	Report	Jusino (yellow card) 73'	Stadium: Toyota Stadium; Referee: Elton García

October 13 34	Tulsa Roughnecks FC	1–4	Seattle Sounders FC 2	Tulsa, Oklahoma
7:00 P.M.	Tavares 42'; Gamble (yellow card) 48'; Muñoz (yellow card) 53'	Boxscore	Markey (yellow card) 8'; Diaz 21'; Estrada 46'; Burke-Gilroy 63'; Olsen 87'	Stadium: ONEOK Field; Attendance: 3,018; Referee: José Lara

=== U.S. Open Cup ===
May 16	Tulsa Roughnecks	3–4	FC Wichita	Tulsa, Oklahoma
7:00 pm CDT	Pírez 30', 38'; Lennon 50'; Vuković (yellow card) 68' (yellow-red card) 87'	TUL Report; WIC Report	Gomez (yellow card) 25' (yellow-red card) 48'; Wells 35'; F. Tayou 47', 90+1'	Stadium: Hurricane Soccer & Track Stadium; Referee: Jose Lara
