= 2017 Tulsa Roughnecks FC season =

Tulsa Roughnecks FC
2017 season
- Owner: Daniel & Jeff Hubbard
- Head coach: David Vaudreuil
- Stadium: ONEOK Field
- USL: 7th, Western
- USL Cup: Conference Quarterfinals
- U.S. Open Cup: Fourth round
- Top goalscorer: Ian Svantesson (6)
- Highest home attendance: League/All: 5,647 (7/22 vs. PHX)
- Lowest home attendance: League: 3,015 (4/1 vs. RGV); All: 885 (5/17 vs. OKC U23, USOC)
- Biggest win: TUL 4–0 OC (5/13)
- Biggest defeat: RNO 4–0 TUL (5/24)
Home colors	Away colors	Third colors

The 2017 Tulsa Roughnecks FC season was the club's third season of existence, and their third in the United Soccer League. It is the club's first season playing in the second division of American soccer following U.S. Soccer's sanctioning of USL as a Division II professional league. Including the previous iterations of franchises named "Tulsa Roughnecks", this is the 17th season of a soccer club named the "Roughnecks" playing in the Tulsa metropolitan area.

Outside of the USL, the Roughnecks participated in the 2017 U.S. Open Cup.

== Roster ==
No.	Name	Nationality	Position	Date of birth (age)	Previous club
Goalkeepers
1	Donovan Ricketts	(Jamaica)	GK		(United States) LA Galaxy
12	Fabián Cerda	(Chile)	GK		(Chile) Trasandino
16	Bryan Byars	(United States)	GK		(United States) Rayo OKC
Defenders
2	Paris Gee	(Canada)			(Croatia) NK Rudeš
4	Modou Jadama	(The Gambia)			(Chile) Colo-Colo
6	Brian Rosales	(Cuba)			Free agent
13	Jorge Corrales	(Cuba)			(United States) Fort Lauderdale Strikers
15	Yendri Torres	(Cuba)			(Cuba) Cienfuegos
17	Francisco Ugarte	(Chile)			(Germany) 07 Albstadt
22	Bradley Bourgeois	(United States)			(United States) Houston Dynamo
24	Jaime Ayala	(Mexico)			(Mexico) Cruz Azul
27	Kosuke Kimura	(Japan)			(United States) Rayo OKC
33	Matej Dekovic	(Croatia)			(United States) Chicago Fire
Midfielders
3	Jacori Hayes	(United States)			(United States) FC Dallas
8	Collin Fernandez	(Peru)			(United States) Chicago Fire
10	Juan Pablo Caffa	(Argentina)			(Ecuador) Universidad Católica
11	Joaquin Rivas	(El Salvador)			(United States) Sacramento Republic
23	Brady Ballew	(United States)			(United States) Seattle Redhawks
Forwards
7	Joey Calistri	(United States)			(United States) Chicago Fire
9	Pavel Kondrakhin	(Russia)			(Russia) Dynamo Bryansk
14	Cristian Mata	(United States)			(United States) Tulsa Golden Hurricane
19	Ian Svantesson	(United States)			(United States) Rayo OKC

On loan.
Player's age during the 2017 season.

== Transfers ==
=== In ===
No.	Pos.	Nat.	Name	Age	Moving from	Type	Transfer window	Ends	Transfer fee	Source
1	GK	(Jamaica)	Donovan Ricketts	40	LA Galaxy	Transfer	Pre-season	2018	Free	
2	DF	(Canada)	Paris Gee	22	NK Rudeš (Croatia)	Transfer	Pre-season	2018	Free	
4	DF	(The Gambia)	Modou Jadama	23	Colo-Colo (Chile)	Transfer	Pre-season	2018	Free	
7	FW	(United States)	Joey Calistri	23	Chicago Fire	Loan	Pre-season	2018	Loan	
8	MF	(Peru)	Collin Fernandez	20	Chicago Fire	Loan	Pre-season	2018	Loan	
9	FW	(Russia)	Pavel Kondrakhin	23	Dynamo Bryansk (Russia)	Transfer	Pre-season	2018	Free	
10	MF	(Argentina)	Juan Pablo Caffa	32	Universidad Católica (Ecuador)	Transfer	Pre-season	2018	Free	
11	MF	(El Salvador)	Joaquin Rivas	25	Sacramento Republic	Transfer	Pre-season	2018	Free	
12	GK	(Chile)	Fabián Cerda	28	Trasandino (Chile)	Transfer	Pre-season	2018	Free	
13	DF	(Cuba)	Jorge Luis Corrales	26	Fort Lauderdale Strikers	Transfer	Pre-season	2018	Free	
16	GK	(United States)	Bryan Byars	25	Rayo OKC	Transfer	Pre-season	2018	Free	
17	DF	(Chile)	Francisco Ugarte	30	07 Albstadt (Germany)	Transfer	Pre-season	2018	Free	
19	FW	(United States)	Ian Svantesson	23	Rayo OKC	Transfer	Pre-season	2018	Free	
24	DF	(Mexico)	Jaime Ayala	26	Cruz Azul (Mexico)	Loan	Pre-season	2018	Loan	
27	DF	(Japan)	Kosuke Kimura	33	Rayo OKC	Transfer	Pre-season	2018	Free	
33	DF	(Croatia)	Matej Deković	23	Chicago Fire	Loan	Pre-season	2018	Loan	
3	MF	(United States)	Jacori Hayes	23	FC Dallas	Loan	Mid-season	2018	Loan	

=== Out ===
No.	Pos.	Nat.	Name	Age	Moving to	Type	Transfer window	Transfer fee	Source

== Competitions ==
=== USL ===
==== Standings ====
Pos	Team	Pld	W	D	L	GF	GA	GD	Pts	Qualification
5	Phoenix Rising FC	32	17	7	8	50	37	+13	58	Conference Playoffs
6	OKC Energy FC	32	14	7	11	46	41	+5	49	Conference Playoffs
7	Tulsa Roughnecks	32	14	4	14	46	49	−3	46	Conference Playoffs
8	Sacramento Republic	32	13	7	12	45	43	+2	46	Conference Playoffs
9	Colorado Springs Switchbacks	32	12	8	12	55	51	+4	44	

Source: 2017 USL standings
Rules for classification: 1) total wins; 2) total goal differential; 3) total goals scored; 4) points earned against top four Conference finishers; 5) disciplinary points; 6) coin toss or drawing of lots

==== Results ====
March 25 1	Tulsa Roughnecks	0–3	Colorado Springs Switchbacks	Tulsa, Oklahoma
19:00 CDT	Calistri (yellow card) 37'; Bourgeois (yellow card) 67'; Corrales (yellow card) 88'	Report	Frater (yellow card) 70'; James (yellow card) 77'; McFarlane (yellow card) 90+5'	Stadium: ONEOK Field; Attendance: 4,952; Referee: Andrew Musashe
Note: Match ended in a forfeit after it was discovered the Roughnecks played Paris Gee, who was an ineligible player. Tulsa won the original match 4–1.

April 1 2	Tulsa Roughnecks	1–0	RGVFC Toros	Tulsa, Oklahoma
19:00 CDT	Calistri 31'; Corrales (yellow card) 62'; Kimura (yellow card) 69'	Report		Stadium: ONEOK Field; Attendance: 3,015; Referee: Jon Freemon

April 8 3	Tulsa Roughnecks	1–2	Sacramento Republic	Tulsa, Oklahoma
19:00 CDT	Ugarte (yellow card) 42'; Ayala (yellow card) 63'; Caffa (yellow card) 77'; Calistri 80'	Report	Klimenta (yellow card) 14'; Kneeshaw 48'; Blackwood 67'	Stadium: ONEOK Field; Attendance: 4,759; Referee: Hilario Grajeda

April 22 4	RGVFC Toros	0–1	Tulsa Roughnecks	Edinburg, Texas
19:00 CDT	Luna (yellow card) 90+2'	Report	Ayala 52'; Corrales (yellow card) 55'; Ugarte (yellow card) 65'; Svantesson (yellow card) 75'	Stadium: H-E-B Park; Attendance: 6,181; Referee: Rosendo Mendoza

May 5 5	Colorado Springs Switchbacks	3–0	Tulsa Roughnecks	Colorado Springs, Colorado
20:00 CDT	Kacher 2', 69'; Malcolm 27'; Argueta (yellow card) 35'; Phillips (yellow card) 78'	Report	Ugarte (yellow card) 10'; Caffa (yellow card) 54'; Deković (yellow card) 64'; Gee (yellow card) 89'	Stadium: Weidner Field; Attendance: 3,404; Referee: Greg Dopka

May 11 6	Tulsa Roughnecks	3–1	Whitecaps FC 2	Tulsa, Oklahoma
19:00 CDT	Caffa 27'; Svantesson 40', 53'; Ugarte (yellow card) 49'; Ballew (yellow card) 90+4'	Report	Amanda 48'; Ma. Baldisimo (yellow card) 51'; Sanner (yellow card) 81'; Mi. Baldisimo (yellow card) 84'	Stadium: ONEOK Field; Attendance: 3,128; Referee: Jose Lara

May 13 7	Tulsa Roughnecks	4–0	Orange County SC	Tulsa, Oklahoma
19:00 CDT	Caffa 19'; Svantesson 22', 81' (yellow card) 42'; Calistri 89'	Report	Navarro (yellow card) 58'; Sorto (yellow card) 65'	Stadium: ONEOK Field; Attendance: 4,119; Referee: Charles Murphy

May 20 8	Sacramento Republic	3–2	Tulsa Roughnecks	Sacramento, California
20:30 CDT	Barrera 29'; Ochoa 31'; Klimenta (yellow card) 45+1'; Jakubek (yellow card) 67'; Christian 74'; Caesar (yellow card) 77'	Report	Calistri 7'; Ugarte (yellow card) 42'; Caffa 67' (pen.)	Stadium: Papa Murphy's Park; Attendance: 11,569; Referee: (United States) Marco Vega

May 24 9	Reno 1868	4–0	Tulsa Roughnecks	Reno, Nevada
20:30 CDT	Mfeka (yellow card) 24' (goal) 62'; Casiple (yellow card) 37'; Ockford 43'; Kelly 57'; Hoppenot 67' (yellow card) 71'; Fernandes (yellow card) 75'	Report	Mata (yellow card) 16'; Corrales (yellow card) 55'; Caffa (yellow card) 57'	Stadium: Greater Nevada Field; Attendance: 4,418; Referee: (United States) Farhad Dadkho

May 27 10	Tulsa Roughnecks	3–1	Portland Timbers 2	Tulsa, Oklahoma
17:30 CDT	Rivas 17'; Caffa 25' (pen.); Fernandez (yellow card) 28'; Dekovic (yellow card) 67'; Ugarte (yellow card) 90'	Report	Bijev 35'; Batista (yellow card) 68'; Bjornethun (yellow card) 85'	Stadium: ONEOK Field; Attendance: 3,487; Referee: (United States) Lukasz Szpala

June 11 11	Swope Park Rangers	3–1	Tulsa Roughnecks FC	Kansas City, Missouri
16:00 (CDT)	Kharlton Belmar (yellow card) 21'; Cameron Iwasa 56'; Mark Anthony Gonzalez 90+1' (pen.), 90+3'	Report	Francisco Ugarte (yellow card) 11'; Oumar Ballo 75' (og.); Pavel Kondrakhin (yellow card) 87'	Stadium: Children's Mercy Victory Field; Attendance: 789; Referee: Jon Freemon

June 17 12	San Antonio FC	3–1	Tulsa Roughnecks FC	San Antonio, Texas
7:30 p.m. CDT	Tyrpak 4', 33', (yellow card) 36'; Vega 76'	Report	Rivas 27'; Caffa (yellow card) 54'	Stadium: Toyota Field; Attendance: 7,376; Referee: Patrick Muana

June 27 13	Tulsa Roughnecks FC	1–2	Swope Park Rangers	Tulsa, Oklahoma
19:30 (CDT)	Francisco Ugarte (yellow card) 34'; Jorge Luis Corrales (yellow card) 58'; Collin Fernandez 69'	Report	Lebo Moloto (yellow card) 16'; Diego Rubio 27'; Mark Anthony Gonzalez 63'; Adrian Zendejas (yellow card) 90+2'	Stadium: ONEOK Field; Attendance: 3,443; Referee: Luis Guardia

July 1 14	Tulsa Roughnecks	2–0	Real Monarchs	Tulsa, Oklahoma
19:00 MST	Rivas 47'; Svantesson 79'; Cerda (yellow card) 90+2'	Report	Curinga (yellow card) 17'; Hernández (yellow card) 22'; Lachowecki (yellow card) 81'	Stadium: ONEOK Field; Attendance: 4,866; Referee: M. Vega

July 8 15	OKC Energy FC	1–2	Tulsa Roughnecks FC	Oklahoma City, Oklahoma
7:30 PM CDT	González 39'; Daly (yellow card) 44'; Bond (yellow card) 45+3'; Dixon (yellow card) 64'	Report	Caffa (yellow card) 45+3', (goal) 50' (pen.); Calistri (yellow card) 60', (goal) 66'; Ugarte (yellow card) 83'; Jadama (yellow card) 86'	Stadium: Taft Stadium; Attendance: 4,682; Referee: Guido Gonzales Jr.

July 13 16	LA Galaxy II	2–2	Tulsa Roughnecks FC	Carson, California
9:30 pm	Vera 20'; Dhillon 24'; Engola (yellow card) 41'; Lopez (yellow card) 65'	Report	Fernandez (yellow card) 29'; Jadama 62'; Svantesson 71'	Stadium: StubHub Center; Attendance: 736; Referee: Michael Radchuk

July 22 17	Tulsa Roughnecks FC	3–0	Phoenix Rising FC	Tulsa, Oklahoma
7:30pm	Svantesson 15'; Hayes (yellow card) 28' (goal) 44'; Thierjung 85'	Report; Report	Wright-Phillips (yellow card) 65'; Watson (yellow card) 65'	Stadium: ONEOK Field; Attendance: 5,647; Referee: Jon Freemon

July 31 18	Real Monarchs	0–0	Tulsa Roughnecks	Sandy, Utah
9:00 P.M. CDT	Schuler (yellow card) 72'; Velásquez (yellow card) 77'	Report	Fernandez (yellow card) 89'	Stadium: Rio Tinto Stadium; Attendance: 2,420; Referee: B. Jensen

August 5 19	Tulsa Roughnecks	2–3	Reno 1868	Tulsa, Oklahoma
7:30 P.M. CDT	Caffa 52', (yellow card) 64'; Corrales (yellow card) 58'; Svantesson 67'	Report	Hoppenot 19', (yellow card) 84'; Kelly 26'; Fernandes (yellow card) 52'; Wehan 84'	Stadium: ONEOK Field; Attendance: 3,798; Referee: D. Djurasevic

August 10 20	Tulsa Roughnecks	2–1	Saint Louis FC	Tulsa, OK
7:30 PM CDT	Corrales 25'; Calistri 70'; Bronico (yellow card) 77'	Report	Mirković (yellow card) 30'; Jadama 86' (o.g.)	Stadium: ONEOK Field; Attendance: 3,027; Referee: Luis Guardia

August 12 21	Tulsa Roughnecks FC	2–1	OKC Energy FC	Tulsa, Oklahoma
7:30 PM CDT	Rivas 20'; Svantesson 55'	Report	Barril (yellow card) 35'; Angulo 47' (pen.); Dixon (yellow card) 72'; Fink (yellow card) 90+2'	Stadium: ONEOK Field; Attendance: 4,037; Referee: Ismir Pekmic

August 15 22	Orange County SC	0–0	Tulsa Roughnecks FC	Irvine, California
9:30 PM CDT	Ami Pineda (yellow card) 36'	USL; OC; TUL	Collin Fernandez (yellow card) 65'; Jamie Ayala (yellow card) 90+3'	Stadium: Champion Stadium; Attendance: 1,543; Referee: Daniel Radford

August 23 23	Saint Louis FC	2–1	Tulsa Roughnecks	Fenton, MO
7:00 PM CDT	Bjurman 55'; Stojkov (yellow card) 82'; Rudolph 90'	Report	Calistri 43'; Jadama (yellow card) 70', (yellow card) 78' (red card)	Stadium: World Wide Technology Soccer Park; Attendance: 4,152; Referee: Charles Murphy

August 30 24	Seattle Sounders FC 2	0–1	Tulsa Roughnecks FC	Tukwila, Washington
9:30 (CDT)	Mathers (yellow card) 76'	Recap; Boxscore	Fernandez (yellow card) 19'; Rivas (yellow card) 70'; Ugarte 72'	Stadium: Starfire Sports Complex; Attendance: 1,011; Referee: Jeff Arthurholtz

September 3 25	Portland Timbers 2	1–1	Tulsa Roughnecks	Portland, Oregon
4:00 P.M. CDT	Barmby 13'	Report	Caffa 44' (pen.); Svantesson (yellow card) 60'; Bourgeois (yellow card) 72'	Stadium: Providence Park; Attendance: 1,312; Referee: Timothy Ford

September 6 26	Vancouver Whitecaps 2	1–3	Tulsa Roughnecks	Langley, British Columbia
00:00 CDT	Bustos 50' (pen.)	Report	Caffa 39'; Svantesson 61', (yellow card) 77'; Calistri 62'	Stadium: McLeod Athletic Park; Attendance: 432; Referee: Alain Ruch

September 17 27	OKC Energy FC	2–0	Tulsa Roughnecks FC	Oklahoma City, Oklahoma
5:00 PM CDT	González 5'; Barril 13'; Wallace (yellow card) 86'	Report	Rivas (yellow card) 66'; Caffa (yellow card) 86'	Stadium: Taft Stadium; Attendance: 4,351; Referee: Lukas Szpala

September 23 28	Tulsa Roughnecks FC	1–0	LA Galaxy II	Tulsa, Oklahoma
5:00 pm	Calistri 26'; Corrales (yellow card) 70'; Levin (yellow card) 73'; Kimura (yellow card) 90+3'	Report	Turner (yellow card) 25'	Stadium: ONEOK Field; Attendance: 3,884; Referee: Greg Dopka

September 30 29	Tulsa Roughnecks FC	0–2	San Antonio FC	Tulsa, Oklahoma
7:00 p.m. CDT	Svantesson (yellow card) 28'; Gee (yellow card) 43'; Bourgeois (yellow card) 45+2'	Report	Pecka (yellow card) 43'; Restrepo (yellow card) 45+2'; Reed (yellow card) 58'; O'Ojong 70'; Forbes (yellow card) 81', (goal) 88'	Stadium: ONEOK Field; Attendance: 3,246; Referee: Ismir Pekmic

October 4 30	Phoenix Rising FC	4–3	Tulsa Roughnecks FC	Scottsdale, Arizona
9:00pm	Drogba 16', 24' (pen.); Johnson 19', 66'; Gavin (yellow card) 73'	Report; Report	Rivas 12'; Caffa 14'; Thierjung 30'	Stadium: Phoenix Rising FC Soccer Complex; Attendance: 5,681; Referee: Malik Badawi

October 7 31	Tulsa Roughnecks FC	1–0	Seattle Sounders FC 2	Tulsa, Oklahoma
7:00 P.M. (CDT)	Fernandez (yellow card) 11', (yellow card) 45+3' (red card); Thierjung 14'; Ugarte (yellow card) 29'	Preview	Wingo (yellow card) 19'; Chenkam (yellow card) 49'; Nana-Sinkam (yellow card) 73'; Alfaro (yellow card) 86'	Stadium: ONEOK Field; Attendance: 3,023; Referee: José Lara

October 14 32	Tulsa Roughnecks FC	2–4	Colorado Springs Switchbacks FC	Tulsa, Oklahoma
7:00 P.M. (CDT)	Ayala 29', (yellow card) 53'; Thierjung 35'	Report	Frater 38', (yellow card) 45+2', (goal) 66'; Burt 45', 46'	Stadium: ONEOK Field; Attendance: 3,188; Referee: Eric Tattersall

=== U.S. Open Cup ===
May 17 Second round	Tulsa Roughnecks FC (Oklahoma)	5–3	(Oklahoma) OKC Energy U23	Tulsa, Oklahoma
7:00 PM CDT	Ayala 8'; Mata 13', 49'; Kondrakhin 45+2', 53'	Report	Lindstrom 59'; Gee 63' (o.g.); Okeke 73'	Stadium: Hurricane Soccer & Track Stadium; Attendance: 885; Referee: (Oklahoma) Matt Trotter

May 31 Third round	Tulsa Roughnecks FC (Oklahoma)	0–0 (a.e.t.) (7–6 p)	(Texas) San Antonio FC	Tulsa, Oklahoma
7:00 PM CDT				Stadium: Hurricane Soccer & Track Stadium; Attendance: 5,532; Referee: (Illinois) Elvis Mahmutovic
	Penalties
	Calistri (penalty scored); Caffa (penalty scored); Kondrakhin (penalty missed); Svantesson (penalty scored); Cerda (penalty scored); Jadama (penalty scored); Fernandez (penalty scored); Ugarte (penalty scored)		(penalty scored) Castillo; (penalty scored) Araujo; (penalty scored) Vega; (penalty missed) O'Ojong; (penalty scored) Hassan; (penalty scored) Ajeakwa; (penalty scored) Newnam; (penalty missed) Restrepo

June 14 Fourth round	FC Dallas (Texas)	2–1	(Oklahoma) Tulsa Roughnecks FC	University Park, Texas
7:00 PM CDT	Craft 31'; Jadama 90+2' (o.g.)	Report	Kimura 59'	Stadium: Westcott Field; Referee: (Minnesota) Fotis Bazakos

== Statistics ==
As of July 3, 2017

No.	Pos.	Name	USL		USL Cup		U.S. Open Cup		Total		Discipline	
No.	Pos.	Name	Apps	Goals	Apps	Goals	Apps	Goals	Apps	Goals	Yellow card	Red card
1	GK	(Jamaica) Donovan Ricketts	0	0	0	0	0	0	0	0	0	0
2	DF	(Canada) Paris Gee	0	0	0	0	0	0	0	0	0	0
3	MF	(United States) Jacori Hayes	0	0	0	0	0	0	0	0	0	0
4	DF	(The Gambia) Modou Jadama	0	0	0	0	0	0	0	0	0	0
6	DF	(Cuba) Brian Rosales	0	0	0	0	0	0	0	0	0	0
7	FW	(United States) Joey Calistri	0	0	0	0	0	0	0	0	0	0
8	MF	(Peru) Collin Fernandez	0	0	0	0	0	0	0	0	0	0
9	FW	(Russia) Pavel Kondrakhin	0	0	0	0	0	0	0	0	0	0
10	MF	(Argentina) Juan Pablo Caffa	0	0	0	0	0	0	0	0	0	0
11	MF	(El Salvador) Joaquin Rivas	0	0	0	0	0	0	0	0	0	0
12	GK	(Chile) Fabián Cerda	0	0	0	0	0	0	0	0	0	0
13	DF	(Cuba) Jorge Luis Corrales	0	0	0	0	0	0	0	0	0	0
14	FW	(United States) Cristian Mata	0	0	0	0	0	0	0	0	0	0
15	DF	(Cuba) Yendri Torres	0	0	0	0	0	0	0	0	0	0
16	GK	(United States) Bryan Byars	0	0	0	0	0	0	0	0	0	0
17	DF	(Chile) Francisco Ugarte	0	0	0	0	0	0	0	0	0	0
19	FW	(United States) Ian Svantesson	0	0	0	0	0	0	0	0	0	0
22	DF	(United States) Bradley Bourgeois	0	0	0	0	0	0	0	0	0	0
23	MF	(United States) Brady Ballew	0	0	0	0	0	0	0	0	0	0
24	DF	(Mexico) Jaime Ayala	0	0	0	0	0	0	0	0	0	0
27	DF	(Japan) Kosuke Kimura	0	0	0	0	0	0	0	0	0	0
33	DF	(Croatia) Matej Dekovic	0	0	0	0	0	0	0	0	0	0

== See also ==
- 2017 Chicago Fire season
- 2017 FC Dallas season
