= Gabriel Santos =

Gabriel Santos may refer to:

- Gabriel Joaquim dos Santos (1892-1985), Brazilian salt worker and architect
- Gabriel Santos (footballer, born 1983), Brazilian football centre-back
- Gabriel Santos (swimmer) (born 1996), Brazilian swimmer
- Gabriel Santos (footballer, born 1999), Brazilian football forward
