= João Lopes (footballer) =

Brazilian footballer (born 1996)

Personal information
- Full name: João Vitor Lopes da Silva
- Date of birth: 16 January 1996 (age 30)
- Place of birth: Rio de Janeiro, Brazil
- Height: 1.88 m (6 ft 2 in)
- Position: Goalkeeper

Team information
- Current team: Amazonas
- Number: 1

Youth career
- 2013–2017: Flamengo
- 2017–2018: Portuguesa

Senior career*
Years	Team	Apps	(Gls)
2017–2020	Portuguesa	14	(0)
2018–2020	→ Santa Clara (loan)	3	(0)
2020–2021	Fluminense	0	(0)
2022-	AA Portuguesa	0	(0)
2022	Guarani	1	(0)
2023	AA Portuguesa	6	(0)
2024	Barra	7	(0)
2025-	Amazonas	15	(0)
- * Club domestic league appearances and goals as of 10 November 2026

João Vitor Lopes da Silva (born 16 January 1996), known professionally as João Lopes is a Brazilian professional footballer who plays as a goalkeeper for Amazonas.

== Career ==
=== Portuguesa ===
Born in Rio de Janeiro, João Lopes was a Flamengo youth graduate. In January 2017, after failing to make a first team breakthrough, he moved to Portuguesa.

Initially a backup to veteran Ricardo Berna, João Lopes made his senior debut on 11 October 2017, starting in a 1–1 Copa Paulista away draw against Linense. On 28 November, he renewed his contract with the club until the end of 2018.

==== Santa Clara (loan) ====
On 2 July 2018, after being a regular starter in the Campeonato Paulista Série A2, João Lopes was loaned to Portuguese Primeira Liga side Santa Clara for one year, while also renewing his contract with Lusa until 2021. A backup to Marco Pereira, he made his debut abroad on 27 April 2019, starting in a 0–0 home draw against Vitória de Setúbal.

On 5 July 2019, João Lopes' loan to Santa Clara was extended for a further season; his contract with Portuguesa was also extended until 2022. The following 19 January, after being demoted to third-choice after the arrival of André Ferreira, he terminated his loan deal.

=== Fluminense ===
On 29 January 2020, João Lopes agreed to a two-year contract with Fluminense in the Série A. He left the club in December 2021 after his contract expired.
