= Cláudio (footballer, born 1987) =

Brazilian footballer

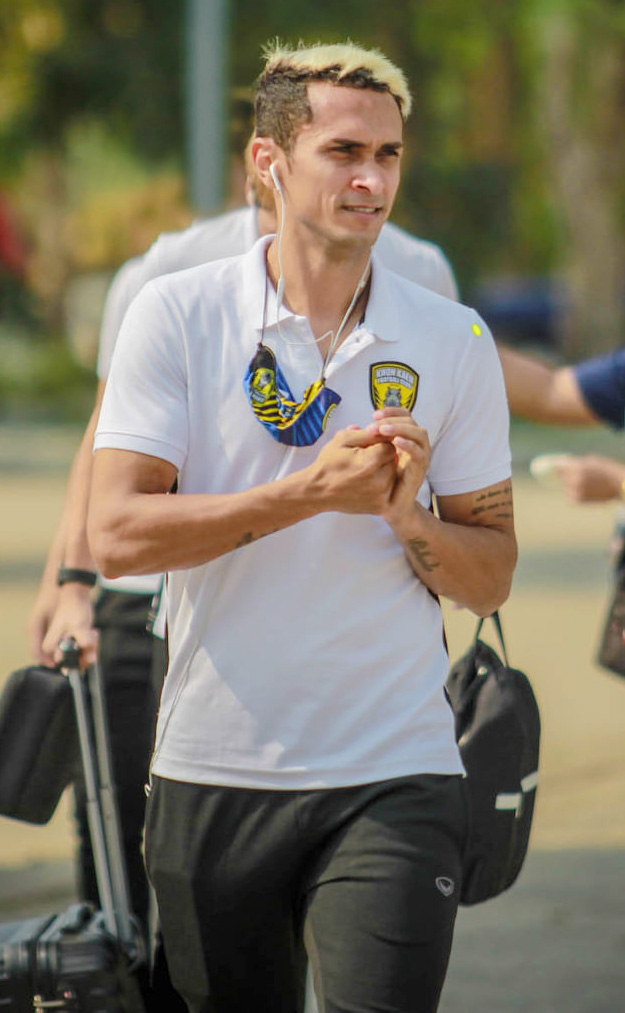

Personal information
- Full name: Luís Cláudio Carvalho da Silva
- Date of birth: 27 March 1987 (age 39)
- Place of birth: Jaguarari, Brazil
- Height: 1.82 m (6 ft 0 in)
- Positions: Winger; forward

Team information
- Current team: Chanthaburi United
- Number: 9

Youth career
- Palmeiras

Senior career*
Years	Team	Apps	(Gls)
2005–2010	Palmeiras	8	(0)
2007	→ Juventude (loan)	2	(0)
2008–2009	→ Marília (loan)	15	(2)
2009	→ Hammarby IF (loan)	5	(0)
2010	Brasil de Pelotas	0	(0)
2011	Salgueiro	5	(0)
2012	São José	5	(0)
2013	CA Juventus	8	(0)
2013	Caldense	1	(0)
2014	Campinense	3	(0)
2015	Piauí	5	(3)
2015	Salgueiro	8	(1)
2016	Al-Nahda		
2017	Portuguesa	1	(0)
2017	Taboão da Serra	0	(0)
2018	Dunav Ruse	4	(0)
2018	St. Lucia		
2019	Oratory Youths		
2019	Angthong		
2020	North Bangkok University	2	(1)
2020	Angthong	4	(3)
2020–2021	Khon Kaen	9	(1)
2021–2023	STK Muangnont	0	(0)
2023	Marines		
2024–	Chanthaburi United		

International career
2005	Brazil U17	3	(0)
- * Club domestic league appearances and goals as of 21 March 2021

Luís Cláudio Carvalho da Silva (born 27 March 1987), commonly known as Cláudio, is a Brazilian footballer who plays as a forward for Chanthaburi United in Thai League 3.

== Biography ==
Born in Jaguarari, Bahia, Cláudio started his career at Palmeiras. He signed his first professional contract with the club in August 2005, which last until in June 2009. He was loaned to Juventude in the second half of year 2007 for its 2007 Campeonato Brasileiro Série A. But after his false identity discovered, he was suspended. In June 2008, he added 1 more year to his contract with Palmeiras. He was loaned to Campeonato Brasileiro Série B club Marília for a year in September 2008. He played twice in the national league, on 17 October and on 28 October. He also played for the team at 2009 Campeonato Paulista.

In July 2009, Swedish team Hammarby signed him for remainder of the season. The team finished as the 16th and relegated from Allsvenskan.

In February 2010 he was released by Palmeiras. He was signed by Brasil de Pelotas in June 2010 for 2010 Campeonato Brasileiro Série C, but never played. He was released in September, after Brasil failed to qualify for the second round.

In February 2018 Cláudio signed a two-and-a-half-year contract with First Professional League team Dunav Ruse.

At the end of June 2019, Cláudio joined Thai club Angthong.

=== International career ===
He played 3 times at 2005 FIFA U-17 World Championship. The team finished as the runner-up.
