= Mateo Bustos =

Argentine footballer (born 1992)

Personal information
- Full name: Daniel Mateo Bustos
- Date of birth: 9 October 1992 (age 34)
- Place of birth: Córdoba, Argentina
- Height: 1.69 m (5 ft 7 in)
- Position: Midfielder

Youth career
- Racing de Córdoba

Senior career*
Years	Team	Apps	(Gls)
2013–2015	Racing de Córdoba	15	(5)
2013–2014	→ Jorge Ross (loan)		
2015–2016	Central Córdoba	16	(1)
2016	Rampla Juniors	12	(0)
2017	Portuguesa	0	(0)
2017–2018	Naxxar Lions	18	(4)
2018–2019	Nadur Youngsters	10	(0)
2020	Persita Tangerang	3	(0)
2021	Yaracuyanos	0	(0)
2021	Racing de Córdoba	4	(0)
2021–2022	Cañuelas	0	(0)
2022	Resistencia	24	(2)
2023	Persita Tangerang	13	(0)
2024	San Antonio Bulo Bulo	11	(0)
- * Club domestic league appearances and goals as of 5 May 2024

Daniel Mateo Bustos (born 9 October 1992) is an Argentine professional footballer who plays as a midfielder.

== Club career ==
Born in Malagueño, Santa María Department, Córdoba, Bustos represented Racing de Córdoba as a youth. On 26 February 2013 he made his first team debut, starting in a 0–3 Torneo Argentino A away loss against San Martín de Tucumán.

Bustos was loaned to ADyT Jorge Ross ahead of the 2013–14 campaign. Returning to Racing the following year, he established himself as a starter before signing for Primera B Nacional side Central Córdoba de Santiago del Estero on 14 January 2015.

Bustos made his professional debut on 18 April 2015, coming on as second half substitute in a 2–0 home win against All Boys. His first goal came on 12 June, the game's only in a home success over Gimnasia y Esgrima de Mendoza.

In July 2016 Bustos moved abroad for the first time in his career, joining Uruguayan Primera División club Rampla Juniors. The following 23 January he switched teams and countries again, signing for Portuguesa in Brazil.

On 14 January 2020, Bustos left Nadur Youngsters and signed a contract with Indonesian Liga 1 club Persita Tangerang.
