= Santiago Maidana =

Argentine footballer (born 1991)

Personal information
- Full name: Santiago Martín Maidana
- Date of birth: 2 February 1991 (age 35)
- Place of birth: Munro, Buenos Aires, Argentina
- Height: 1.70 m (5 ft 7 in)
- Position: Attacking midfielder

Youth career
- River Plate

Senior career*
Years	Team	Apps	(Gls)
2013–2014	Deportivo Armenio	5	(0)
2015–2016	Germinal		
2016–2017	Malvinas Argentinas		
2018	Tulsa Roughnecks	4	(0)

International career
- Argentina U20
- * Club domestic league appearances and goals as of 11:08, 11 October 2018 (UTC)

Santiago Martín Maidana (born 2 February 1991) is an Argentine professional footballer who plays as a midfielder.
