= Tárik (footballer, born 1993) =

Brazilian footballer

Personal information
- Full name: Tárik Michel Kedes Boschetti
- Date of birth: 18 February 1993 (age 33)
- Place of birth: Erechim, Brazil
- Height: 1.83 m (6 ft 0 in)
- Position: Defensive midfielder

Team information
- Current team: Londrina
- Number: 5

Youth career
- 2005–2008: Juventude
- 2009–2012: Internacional
- 2013: Athletico Paranaense

Senior career*
Years	Team	Apps	(Gls)
2014	Athletico Paranaense	5	(0)
2014	→ Ferroviária (loan)	0	(0)
2015	Osaka	23	(1)
2016	Pusamania Borneo	11	(0)
2016	Honka	4	(0)
2017	Portuguesa	18	(1)
2017	Virtus Francavilla		
2018	Ypiranga	29	(0)
2018–2019	Platanias	34	(1)
2020	Ypiranga	30	(1)
2021	Ituano	13	(0)
2021	Londrina	25	(2)
2022–2023	Botafogo-SP	71	(2)
2024	Chapecoense	35	(1)
2025	Ferroviária	22	(1)
2026	Ponte Preta	11	(1)
2026–	Londrina	16	(1)
- * Club domestic league appearances and goals as of 18 November 2026

Tárik Michel Kedes Boschetti (born 18 February 1993), commonly known as Tárik or Tarik Boschetti, is a Brazilian footballer who plays as a defensive midfielder for Brazilian club Londrina.

== Career statistics ==
=== Club ===
As of 31 January 2020.

Club	Season	League			State League		Cup		Continental		Other		Total	
Club	Season	Division	Apps	Goals	Apps	Goals	Apps	Goals	Apps	Goals	Apps	Goals	Apps	Goals
Athletico Paranaense	2014	Série A	0	0	5 (Note: Appearances in the Campeonato Paranaense)	0	0	0	–		0	0	5	0
Ferroviária (loan)	2014	–			0	0	0	0	–		12 (Note: Appearances in the Copa Paulista)	0	12	0
Osaka	2015	JFL	23	1	–		0	0	–		0	0	23	1
Pusamania Borneo	2016	Torabika Soccer Championship	10	0	–		0	0	–		0	0	10	0
Honka	2016	Kakkonen	4	0	–		0	0	–		0	0	4	0
Portuguesa	2017	Série D	3	0	14 (Note: Appearances in the Campeonato Paulista A2)	1	1 (Note: Appearances in the Copa do Brasil)	0	–		0	0	18	1
Ypiranga-RS	2018	Série C	14	0	0	0	0	0	–		0	0	14	0
Platanias	2018–19	Football League	26	1	–		1 (Note: Appearances in the Greek Cup)	0	–		2 (Note: Appearances in the Football League relegation play/offs)	0	29	1
Platanias	2019–20	Super League Greece 2	8	0	–		3	0	–		0	0	11	0
Platanias	Total		34	1	0	0	4	0	0	0	2	0	40	1
Ypiranga-RS	2020	Série C	0	0	1 (Note: Appearances in the Campeonato Gaúcho)	0	0	0	–		0	0	1	0
Career total			88	2	20	1	5	0	0	0	14	0	127	3
