= Jaime Ayala (footballer) =

Mexican footballer (born 1990)

Personal information
- Full name: Jaime Ayala Jain
- Date of birth: 16 September 1990 (age 36)
- Place of birth: Uruapan, Mexico
- Height: 1.80 m (5 ft 11 in)
- Position: Midfielder

Senior career*
Years	Team	Apps	(Gls)
2010	Venados	9	(1)
2011–2012	Albinegros de Orizaba		
2012	Reynosa		
2012–2014	Cruz Azul Hidalgo	19	(1)
2014–2015	Atlético San Luis	6	(0)
2015–2016	Celaya	20	(2)
2017	Tulsa Roughnecks	23	(2)
2018–2019	Boyacá Chicó	25	(0)
2019	Real Estelí	14	(2)
- * Club domestic league appearances and goals as of 4 April 2025

Jaime Ayala Jain (born 16 September 1990) is a Mexican professional footballer who plays as a midfielder.
