= Claudio Muñoz (footballer, born 1984) =

Chilean footballer

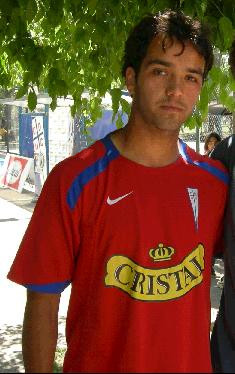
- Muñoz with Universidad Católica in 2007

Personal information
- Full name: Claudio Andrès Muñoz Camilo
- Date of birth: 2 December 1984 (age 41)
- Place of birth: Quinta Normal, Santiago, Chile
- Height: 1.81 m (5 ft 11 1/2 in)
- Position: Defender

Youth career
- 1997–2003: Universidad Católica

Senior career*
Years	Team	Apps	(Gls)
2004–2007	Universidad Católica	68	(3)
2008	UA Maracaibo	15	(4)
2008	Provincial Osorno	9	(0)
2009–2010	Universidad de Concepción	60	(2)
2011	Unión La Calera	37	(1)
2012–2016	Huachipato	145	(2)
2016–2017	Deportes Antofagasta	18	(1)
2017	San Marcos	15	(0)
2018	Tulsa Roughnecks	31	(0)
Total		398	(13)

International career
2006	Chile	2	(0)
- * Club domestic league appearances and goals

Claudio Andrès Muñoz Camilo (born December 2, 1984) is a Chilean footballer who plays as a defender.

== Club career ==
A product of Universidad Católica youth system, he is a well remembered player of Huachipato from 2012 to 2016. In 2008, he played abroad for the Venezuelan club Unión Atlético Maracaibo.

In Chile, he also played for Provincial Osorno, Universidad de Concepción, Unión La Calera, Deportes Antofagasta and San Marcos de Arica, where he became the team captain.

His last club was Tulsa Roughnecks in the 2018 USL.

== International career ==
He made two appearances for the Chile national team in 2006 and 2007.

== Post-retirement ==
Following his retirement, Muñoz made his home in Tulsa, Oklahoma, and has continued with his studies as a soccer coach. He works as coach and technical director of West Side Alliance Soccer Club with men and women players.

== Honours ==
=== Player ===
Universidad Católica

- Primera División de Chile (1): 2005 Clausura

Universidad de Concepción

- Primera División de Chile (1): 2009

Huachipato

- Primera División de Chile (1): 2012 Clausura
