= Francisco Ugarte (footballer, born 1959) =

Argentine-born Chilean footballer

Personal information
- Full name: Francisco Jorge Ugarte Hidalgo
- Date of birth: 21 March 1959 (age 67)
- Place of birth: Mendoza, Argentina
- Height: 1.65 m (5 ft 5 in)
- Position: Midfielder

Youth career
- 1973–1977: Unión Española

Senior career*
Years	Team	Apps	(Gls)
1978–1979	Unión La Calera		
1980–1981	Everton		
1982	Deportes Ovalle		
1983	Trasandino	35	(3)
1984–1985	Cobreloa	31	(1)
1986	Deportes Concepción	0	(0)
1986–1987	Unión Española	54	(13)
1988	Deportes La Serena	0	(0)
1988–1990	Charleroi	15	(0)
1990–1991	PAS Giannina	27	(0)
1991	Provincial Osorno	14	(0)
1992–1993	O'Higgins	25	(1)
1993	Everton	27	(5)
1994–1995	Provincial Osorno	41	(6)
1996–1999	Huachipato	69	(1)
1999	Provincial Osorno		
2000	Unión Española	0	(0)

International career
1979	Chile U20		
1984	Chile Pre-Olympic		
1987–1988	Chile	6	(0)

Managerial career
- 2004–2009: Atlanta Fire United
- 2009–: United Football Academy
- * Club domestic league appearances and goals

Francisco Jorge Ugarte Hidalgo (born 21 March 1959) is a former Argentine-born Chilean footballer.

== Club career ==
Ugarte began his professional career with Unión La Calera, and spent several seasons playing in Chile before moving to Europe for two seasons with Charleroi in the Belgian League and one season with PAS Giannina in the Super League Greece.

== International career ==
Ugarte represented Chile at the 1979 South American U20 Championship and the 1984 Pre-Olympic Tournament.

Ugarte made six appearances for the senior Chile national football team, his debut coming in a friendly against Brazil on 9 December 1987.

== Managerial career ==
From 2001 to 2002, Ugarte served as general manager of Unión Española. In 2003, he worked as a football agent.

In recent years, Ugarte moved to Atlanta, Georgia, in the United States, where he coached for several years and to somewhat success at Atlanta Fire United. Ugarte left AFU to coach at Norcross Soccer Association. In recent years, Ugarte, also known as "Pancho", is the director of coaching at United Football Academy (UFA) Lawrenceville and has had some success with his under-18 side and his under-15. His teams have competed in the Southern Clubs Champions league.

== Personal life ==
Ugarte is nicknamed Condorito.

He is the brother-in-law of the Chilean former international footballer Osvaldo Hurtado.

Ugarte made his home in Atlanta, Georgia, United States.
