= Danilo Mariotto =

Brazilian footballer (born 1996)

Personal information
- Full name: Danilo Mariotto dos Santos
- Date of birth: 15 January 1996 (age 30)
- Place of birth: Rio de Janeiro, Brazil
- Height: 1.84 m (6 ft 1/2 in)
- Position: Forward

Youth career
- Audax
- 2013–2014: Fluminense

Senior career*
| Years | Team | Apps | (Gls) |
| 2014–2017 | Fluminense | 0 | (0) |
| 2014–2015 | → Volyn Lutsk (loan) | 9 | (1) |
| 2015 | → Olimpija (loan) | 4 | (0) |
| 2016 | → Šamorín (loan) | 7 | (1) |
| 2017 | → Portuguesa (loan) | 0 | (0) |
| 2017–2019 | Boavista | | |
| 2019–2021 | Caldense | 20 | (7) |
| 2020 | → Toledo (loan) | 4 | (3) |
| 2021–2022 | Al-Washm | | |
- * Club domestic league appearances and goals as of 19:36, 24 June 2019 (UTC)

Danilo Mariotto dos Santos (born 15 January 1996), known as Danilo Mariotto or simply Mariotto, is a Brazilian footballer who plays as a forward, most recently for Al-Washm.

Mariotto started his professional career in the team of Fluminense as product of the youth sportive system. In August 2014 he was transferred on loan to Ukrainian side Volyn Lutsk where he made his debut for in the match against FC Chornomorets Odesa on 11 August 2014 in the Ukrainian Premier League.
