= Jonatas Paulista =

Brazilian footballer

Personal information
- Full name: Jonatas Barbosa Rodrigues
- Date of birth: 5 February 1994 (age 32)
- Place of birth: São Paulo, Brazil
- Height: 1.76 m (5 ft 9 in)
- Position: Defensive midfielder

Team information
- Current team: Noroeste
- Number: 5

Youth career
- Corinthians
- 2007–2014: Vasco da Gama

Senior career*
Years	Team	Apps	(Gls)
2012–2016	Vasco da Gama	1	(0)
2015	→ Boa Esporte (loan)	8	(0)
2016	→ Boavista (loan)	1	(0)
2017	Noroeste	19	(0)
2017–2019	Portuguesa	33	(0)
2020–2024	Noroeste	96	(0)
2024	Votuporanguense	0	(0)
2025–	Noroeste	9	(0)

International career
2010	Brazil U16		
- * Club domestic league appearances and goals as of 06:15, 21 February 2025 (UTC)

Jonatas Barbosa Rodrigues (born 5 February), known as Jonatas Paulista, is a Brazilian professional footballer who plays as a defensive midfielder for Noroeste.

== Club career ==
Born in São Paulo (hence the nickname Paulista), Jonatas began his career with Corinthians, but was released at the age of 12 and subsequently joined Vasco da Gama. He made his first team debut for the side on 3 March 2012, coming on as a second-half substitute for injured Carlos Tenorio in a 2–0 Campeonato Carioca away win over Olaria.

Jonatas Paulista later returned to the youth sides, and renewed his contract until 2016 in February 2013, while nursing a knee injury. On 8 June 2015, he was loaned to Série B side Boa Esporte.

Jonatas Paulista began the 2016 season on loan at Boavista, but only played once before suffering another knee injury, and was released by Vasco in the middle of that year, after fully recovering. He spent the remaining months of the year unemployed, before signing for Noroeste for the 2017 campaign.

On 16 May 2017, Jonatas Paulista signed a two-year deal with Portuguesa. He left the club on 4 October 2019, and returned to Norusca on 28 November.

On 8 June 2024, Jonatas Paulista joined Votuporanguense. He left on 30 October, and returned to Noroeste on 15 November.

== International career ==
In December 2009, Jonatas Paulista was called up to the Brazil national under-16 team for a tournament in Mexico.

== Career statistics ==
As of 21 February 2025

Club	Season	League			State League		Cup		Continental		Other		Total	
Club	Season	Division	Apps	Goals	Apps	Goals	Apps	Goals	Apps	Goals	Apps	Goals	Apps	Goals
Vasco da Gama	2012	Série A	0	0	1	0	—		0	0	—		1	0
Boa Esporte	2015	Série B	8	0	—		—		—		—		8	0
Boavista	2016	Série D	0	0	1	0	—		—		—		1	0
Noroeste	2017	Paulista A3	—		19	0	—		—		—		19	0
Portuguesa	2017	Série D	3	0	—		—		—		21 (Note: Appearance(s) in Copa Paulista)	0	24	0
Portuguesa	2018	Paulista A2	—		15	0	—		—		11	0	26	0
Portuguesa	2019	Paulista A2	—		15	0	—		—		10	0	25	0
Portuguesa	Total		3	0	30	0	—		—		42	0	75	0
Noroeste	2020	Paulista A3	—		19	0	—		—		—		19	0
Noroeste	2021	Paulista A3	—		16	0	—		—		8	0	24	0
Noroeste	2022	Paulista A3	—		21	0	—		—		9	0	30	0
Noroeste	2023	Paulista A2	—		19	0	—		—		8	1	27	1
Noroeste	2024	Paulista A2	—		21	0	—		—		—		21	0
Noroeste	Total		—		96	0	—		—		25	0	121	0
Votuporanguense	2024	Paulista A3	—		—		—		—		14	0	14	0
Noroeste	2025	Paulista	—		9	0	—		—		—		9	0
Career total			11	0	156	0	0	0	0	0	81	0	248	0

== Honours ==
Noroeste

- Campeonato Paulista Série A3: 2022
