= Luizinho (footballer, born 1996) =

Brazilian footballer

Personal information
- Full name: Luiz Henrique Alves Angelo
- Date of birth: 7 January 1996 (age 30)
- Place of birth: São Paulo, Brazil
- Height: 1.99 m (6 ft 6 1/2 in)
- Position: Attacking midfielder

Team information
- Current team: Volta Redonda

Youth career
- Ponte Preta
- 2014–2016: Granada

Senior career*
Years	Team	Apps	(Gls)
2013–2014	Ponte Preta	2	(0)
2014–2016	Granada B	17	(0)
2016	→ Linares (loan)	6	(0)
2016	→ Atibaia (loan)	0	(0)
2017–2019	Portuguesa	71	(8)
2019–2021	Ituano	33	(1)
2021	→ São Caetano (loan)	9	(0)
2022	Figueirense	16	(2)
2022	→ Amazonas (loan)	4	(0)
2023–	Volta Redonda	28	(2)
- * Club domestic league appearances and goals as of 7 October 2023

Luiz Henrique Alves Angelo (born 7 January 1996), commonly known as Luizinho, is a Brazilian footballer who plays for Volta Redonda as an attacking midfielder.

== Club career ==
Born in São Paulo, Luizinho graduated from Ponte Preta's youth setup. On 1 December 2013 he made his first team – and Série A – debut, replacing William in the 76th minute of a 0–2 home loss against Portuguesa.

In 2014 Luizinho moved to Granada CF, being assigned to the Juvenil squad. In July he was promoted to the reserves in Segunda División B.

On 18 January 2016, Luizinho was loaned to fellow third-tier club Linares Deportivo, until June. On 20 July, he moved to Sport Club Atibaia in his homeland, also in a temporary deal.
