= Michael Gamble (soccer) =

English-born American soccer player

Personal information
- Date of birth: January 5, 1994 (age 32)
- Place of birth: Bedford, England
- Height: 1.70 m (5 ft 7 in)
- Positions: Midfielder; forward

Youth career
- 2008–2012: Baltimore Bays

College career
Years	Team	Apps	(Gls)
2012–2015	Wake Forest Demon Deacons	60	(24)

Senior career*
Years	Team	Apps	(Gls)
2013	Baltimore Bohemians	8	(4)
2016	New England Revolution	0	(0)
2016	→ Rochester Rhinos (loan)	1	(0)
2018	Tulsa Roughnecks	30	(3)
2019	Deportes Santa Cruz	7	(0)
2020–2022	Loudoun United	43	(0)

International career
- United States U20
- * Club domestic league appearances and goals as of October 19, 2022

Michael Gamble (born January 5, 1994) is an American soccer player who plays as a forward.

== Career ==
=== College and amateur ===
Gamble played four years of college soccer at Wake Forest University between 2012 and 2015. While at college, he appeared for Premier Development League side Baltimore Bohemians during their 2013 season.

=== Professional ===
On January 14, 2016, Gamble was drafted 30th overall in the 2016 MLS SuperDraft by New England Revolution. He made his professional debut while on loan to New England's United Soccer League affiliate Rochester Rhinos, appearing in a 0–0 draw with New York Red Bulls II on April 17, 2016. Gamble was waived by New England on June 13, 2016.

On January 13, 2020, Gamble signed with Loudoun United.
