= Pavel Kondrakhin =

Russian footballer

Personal information
- Full name: Pavel Vladimirovich Kondrakhin
- Date of birth: 27 April 1994 (age 32)
- Place of birth: Moscow, Russia
- Height: 1.87 m (6 ft 1 1/2 in)
- Position: Forward

Senior career*
Years	Team	Apps	(Gls)
2014	FC TSK Simferopol	2	(0)
2015	FC Biolog-Novokubansk Progress	12	(2)
2015	Ulisses FC	5	(0)
2016	FC Dynamo Bryansk	3	(1)
2017	Tulsa Roughnecks	11	(0)
- * Club domestic league appearances and goals

Pavel Vladimirovich Kondrakhin (Russian: Павел Владимирович Кондрахин; born 27 April 1994) is a former Russian football player who played as a forward.

== Career ==
He made his professional debut in the Russian Professional Football League for FC TSK Simferopol on 20 August 2014 in a game against FC SKChF Sevastopol.

After playing for several years in the Russian and Armenian leagues, Kondrakhin signed for Tulsa Roughnecks of the United Soccer League on March 3, 2017.

Kondrakhin has a United States passport, thus he counted as a domestic player as per United Soccer League roster restrictions.
