= D. J. Dean (soccer) =

Association football player

D.J. Dean
Personal information
- Full name: Dominique Jeremías Dean
- Date of birth: 29 December 1998 (age 27)
- Place of birth: Tulsa, Oklahoma, United States
- Height: 1.75 m (5 ft 9 in)
- Position: Winger

College career
Years	Team	Apps	(Gls)
2017	Central Arkansas Bears	0	(0)

Senior career*
Years	Team	Apps	(Gls)
2018–2019	Tulsa Roughnecks	21	(0)
2020	Antigua	0	(0)
2021	Guastatoya	4	(0)
2022	Michigan Stars	1	(0)
2023	Xinabajul	14	(1)
2023	Michigan Stars	4	(0)
- * Club domestic league appearances and goals as of 17:34, 9 June 2024 (UTC)

Dominique Jeremías Dean (born 29 September 1998), known as D.J. Dean, is a footballer who plays as a winger. Born in the United States, he holds both American and Guatemalan citizenships.

== Career ==
On 9 June 2018, Dean signed with United Soccer League side Tulsa Roughnecks.

On 4 January 2020, Dean joined Guatamalen side Antigua GFC.

On 29 July 2021, he made the move to Guastatoya.
