= Cristian Mata =

American soccer player

Personal information
- Date of birth: February 25, 1994 (age 32)
- Place of birth: Mexico
- Height: 1.75 m (5 ft 9 in)
- Position: Forward

Youth career
- Union Redskins
- Tulsa SC

College career
| Years | Team | Apps | (Gls) |
| 2012–2013 | Tulsa Golden Hurricane | | |

Senior career*
| Years | Team | Apps | (Gls) |
| 2015–2017 | Tulsa Roughnecks | 42 | (10) |
- * Club domestic league appearances and goals as of 23:11, 20 October 2017 (UTC)

Cristian Mata (born February 25, 1994) is an American soccer player who plays as a forward.

== Career ==
=== College and amateur ===
Mata spent two years playing college soccer at the University of Tulsa between 2012 and 2013.

=== Professional ===
Mata signed with United Soccer League club Tulsa Roughnecks on June 25, 2015.
