= Bruno Farias =

Brazilian footballer (born 1987)

Personal information
- Full name: Bruno Candido Farias
- Date of birth: 20 November 1987 (age 38)
- Place of birth: Junqueirópolis, Brazil
- Height: 1.75 m (5 ft 9 in)
- Position: Attacking midfielder

Youth career
- 1997–2000: Dracena
- 2000–2002: São Paulo
- 2003–2005: Santos
- 2005–2007: Internacional
- 2007: Palmeiras

Senior career*
Years	Team	Apps	(Gls)
2007	Palmeiras B		
2007	Palmeiras	1	(0)
2008	Marília		
2009–2011	Porto Alegre	1	(0)
2011–2013	Linense	2	(0)
2012	→ Rio Claro (loan)	0	(0)
2013–2015	Marília	34	(6)
2015	América-RN	6	(1)
2016	Itumbiara	5	(0)
2016	Audax	4	(0)
2016	Joinville	6	(0)
2017	Portuguesa	0	(0)
- * Club domestic league appearances and goals as of 4 October 2016

Bruno Candido Farias (born 20 November 1987), known as Bruno Farias, is a Brazilian footballer who plays as an attacking midfielder.

== Club career ==
Farias was born in Junqueirópolis, São Paulo, and represented Dracena FC, São Paulo, Santos, Internacional and Palmeiras as a youth. He made his senior debut with the latter's B-team in 2007.

Farias made his Série A debut on 30 June 2007, coming on as a substitute in a 1–0 away win against Corinthians. After leaving Verdão, he subsequently represented Marília (two stints), Porto Alegre, Linense, Rio Claro, América-RN, Itumbiara, Audax, Joinville and Portuguesa.
