= Amaral (footballer, born 1987) =

Brazilian footballer

Personal information
- Full name: Antonio Cleilson da Silva Feitosa
- Date of birth: 5 September 1987 (age 39)
- Place of birth: Fortaleza, Brazil
- Height: 1.67 m (5 ft 6 in)
- Position: Right-back

Youth career
- 2002–2005: Fortaleza

Senior career*
Years	Team	Apps	(Gls)
2005	Fortaleza	26	(2)
2006–2010	Palmeiras	25	(0)
2007–2008	→ Corinthians (loan)	3	(0)
2008	→ Atlético Mineiro (loan)	3	(0)
2008–2009	→ Las Palmas (loan)	7	(0)
2010	→ Bragantino (loan)	3	(0)
2010	→ Duque de Caxias (loan)	26	(0)
2011	Ponte Preta	3	(0)
2011–2013	Caracas	47	(1)
2014	Fortaleza	0	(0)
2014	Tiradentes-CE	0	(0)
2015	Cabofriense	1	(0)
2015	Ferroviário	0	(0)
2016	Oeste	9	(0)
2017	Uniclinic	6	(0)
2017	Portuguesa	11	(0)
2018	Ferroviário	4	(0)
2019	URT	0	(0)
2019–2020	Caucaia	3	(0)
2020	Aliança Atlética	7	(2)
2021	Guarany de Sobral	0	(0)

International career
- Brazil U17
2007	Brazil U20		
- * Club domestic league appearances and goals

Antônio Cleilson da Silva Feitosa (born 5 September 1987), commonly known as Amaral, is a Brazilian retired footballer who played as a right-back.

== Club career ==
Amaral is a talented side back who can attack from either side of the pitch. He is known for his ability to score in addition to his crossing skills. The young player was signed by Série A side SE Palmeiras after some stunning performances for Fortaleza EC. Amaral featured on a regular basis for Palmeiras' first-team squad.

After a decline in productivity, he fell out of favor with then-coach Caio Junior and was loaned out to SC Corinthians Paulista and Atlético Mineiro, until securing a loan deal with the Segunda División side Las Palmas.

Amaral owes his nickname to his physical likeness with the seasoned Brazilian midfielder Alexandre da Silva Mariano.

Amaral was capped at the U17 and U20 levels for Brazil.

== Honours ==
Fortaleza

- Campeonato Cearense: 2005

Ferroviário

- Campeonato Brasileiro Série D: 2018

Brazil U20

- South American Youth Football Championship: 2007
