= Gabriel Joaquim dos Santos =

Gabriel Joaquim dos Santos (1892–1985) was a Brazilian salt worker and son of a former slave who rose to prominence as a self-taught architect and outsider artist. He began building the House of the Flower in 1923, which was described as an “intuitive baroque” or Art Brut style of building. Dos Santos constructed and decorated the house throughout his life and until his death. To build and ornament the house, dos Santos gathered scraps and bits of trash— ceramic, china, tile fragments, broken lamps, knick-knacks, shells, chains, fenders, headlights, splintered windows, smashed bottles, broken dishes, bits of old iron, chair legs, wheels, and metal lids - from nearby Cabo Frío. He created sculptures, duplicates, and mosaics that were incorporated into the house's design. Dos Santos once said in reference to his work, "Every tiny shard turns into a thing of beauty."

Having been poor, black, and lacking in formal education and literacy until he was almost 40 years old, dos Santos relied entirely on his own creativity. After his death, the House of the Flower was listed as part of the state's cultural heritage by Inepac, the State Institute of Cultural Heritage. Visitors and art critics consider it a unique expression of spontaneous popular architecture. Gabriel defined it as “a house made of shards and made into a flower”. His work has inspired seminars on architecture, publications, and documentaries, such as O Fio da Memória, by acclaimed Brazilian filmmaker Eduardo Coutinho.
