= Jhon Pírez =

Uruguayan footballer (born 1993)

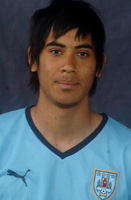

Personal information
- Full name: Jhon Alexander Pírez Araújo
- Date of birth: 20 February 1993 (age 33)
- Place of birth: Montevideo, Uruguay
- Height: 1.87 m (6 ft 2 in)
- Position: Forward

Youth career
- 2004–2008: Defensor Sporting
- 2008–2010: Chelsea

Senior career*
| Years | Team | Apps | (Gls) |
| 2010–2014 | Chelsea | 0 | (0) |
| 2010–2011 | → Defensor Sporting (loan) | 2 | (1) |
| 2012–2014 | → Leganés (loan) | 29 | (3) |
| 2014–2015 | Getafe B | 22 | (0) |
| 2015–2016 | Defensor Sporting | 3 | (0) |
| 2018 | Tulsa Roughnecks | 18 | (1) |
| 2020 | Miramar Misiones | 6 | (0) |

International career
| 2008–2009 | Uruguay U17 | | |
| 2010 | Uruguay U20 | | |
- * Club domestic league appearances and goals as of 17:43, 30 December 2020 (UTC)

Jhon Alexander Pírez Araújo (born 20 February 1993) is an Uruguayan footballer who plays as a striker.

== Career ==
Born in Montevideo, Pírez joined hometown Defensor Sporting's youth categories in 2004, aged 11. On 4 August 2008 he was invited to a trial period at Chelsea, and after impressing during his stay he was granted a scholarship deal with the club.

However, due to FIFA regulations, Pírez was not allowed to play in England before his eighteenth birthday. He subsequently returned to Defensor, now in a loan deal.

In 2010 summer Pírez was promoted to Defensor's first team, but due to appendicitis, missed half of the season. On 5 February 2011, he made his professional debut, against River Plate, replacing David Texeira in the 76th minute and netting a last-minute goal of a 4–1 home routing.

Pírez made his second appearance on 17 April, against Fénix. However, he suffered a knee injury in May.

On 9 July 2012, Pírez joined CE Sabadell FC in a one-month loan deal, mainly to regain match fitness. In late August he was loaned out to CD Leganés, in a season-long deal.

On 10 August 2013, Pírez extended his loan stay at CD Leganés loan with the Madrid side for another campaign, which ended in promotion, with the player appearing in 19 matches, mainly as a substitute. On 23 May 2014 he was released by Chelsea.

On 16 July 2014 Pírez joined Getafe CF, being assigned to the reserves also in the third level.

On 10 August 2015, Pírez re-joined Defensor Sporting on a free transfer after failing to impress in Spain with Getafe.

On 19 December 2017, it was announced that Pírez would join United Soccer League side Tulsa Roughnecks ahead of their 2018 season.

== International career ==
Pírez was capped by Uruguay national under-20 football team for the preliminary squad for the 2011 South American Youth Championship.

=== International goals ===
| No. | Date | Venue | Opponent | Score | Result | Competition | Ref. |
|---|---|---|---|---|---|---|---|
| 1. | 11 September 2011 | Estadio Nacional, Santiago | Chile | 2–2 | 2–2 | Friendly | |

== Career statistics ==
As of match played 22 August 2023

Appearances by club, season and competition
| Club | Season | League | | | Cup | | Continental | | Other | | Total | |
| Club | Season | Division | Apps | Goals | Apps | Goals | Apps | Goals | Apps | Goals | Apps | Goals |
|---|---|---|---|---|---|---|---|---|---|---|---|---|
| Defensor Sporting (loan) | 2010–11 | Primera División | 2 | 1 | 0 | 0 | — | | — | | 2 | 1 |
| Leganés (loan) | 2012–13 | 2ª B – Group 1 | 10 | 2 | 0 | 0 | — | | — | | 10 | 2 |
| Leganés (loan) | 2013–14 | 2ª B – Group 2 | 19 | 1 | 0 | 0 | — | | — | | 19 | 1 |
| Leganés (loan) | Total | | 29 | 3 | 0 | 0 | — | | — | | 29 | 3 |
| Getafe B | 2014–15 | 2ª B – Group 2 | 22 | 0 | — | | — | | — | | 22 | 0 |
| Defensor Sporting | 2015–16 | Primera División | 3 | 0 | 0 | 0 | 0 | 0 | — | | 3 | 0 |
| Tulsa Roughnecks | 2018 | USL Championship | 18 | 1 | 1 | 2 | — | | — | | 19 | 3 |
| Career total | | | 74 | 5 | 1 | 2 | 0 | 0 | 0 | 0 | 75 | 7 |
