= Lucas Basualdo =

Argentine footballer (born 1988)

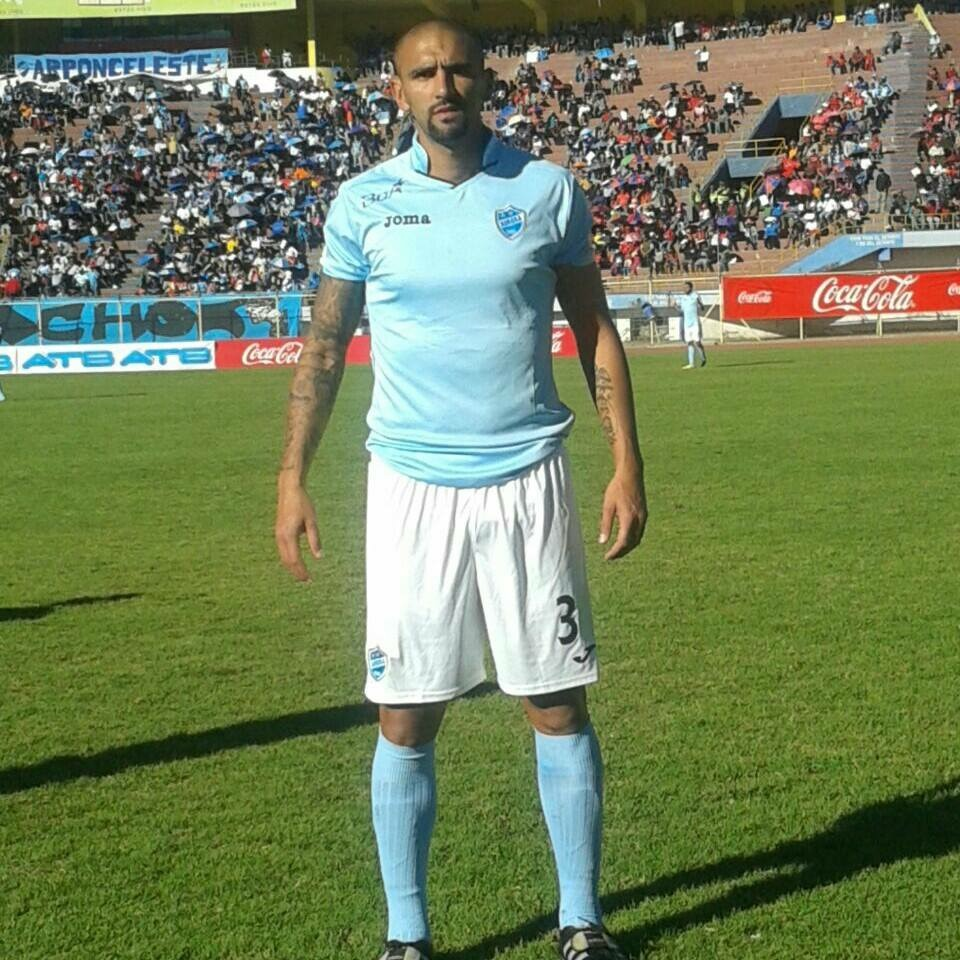

Personal information
- Full name: Lucas Gonzalo Basualdo Reydo
- Date of birth: 2 February 1988 (age 38)
- Place of birth: La Plata, Argentina
- Height: 1.86 m (6 ft 1 in)
- Position: Centre back

Team information
- Current team: Sports Salto

Youth career
- 2002–2003: Gimnasia La Plata
- 2003–2006: Estudiantes
- 2006–2008: Arsenal de Sarandí

Senior career*
Years	Team	Apps	(Gls)
2008–2009	Lemos		
2009–2010	Verín	13	(2)
2010	Daegu	0	(0)
2011	Tianjin Teda		
2012–2013	Argentino de Quilmes		
2013–2014	Municipal Tiquipaya		
2014	Lemos	0	(0)
2015	Aurora		
2016	Sol de Mayo	1	(0)
2016	Independiente Rio Colorado	11	(0)
2017	Portuguesa	0	(0)
2017–	Sports Salto	1	(0)
- * Club domestic league appearances and goals as of 24 April 2017

Lucas Gonzalo Basualdo Reydo (born 2 February 1988) is an Argentine footballer who plays for Club Sports Salto as a central defender.

== Club career ==
An Arsenal de Sarandí youth graduate, Basualdo only made his senior debut in Spain, while playing for Tercera División sides Club Lemos and Verín CF. In 2010, he moved to K-League club Daegu FC.

After making no appearances for Daegu, Basualdo rarely settled into any team, subsequently representing Tianjin Teda in China, Argentino de Quilmes, Sol de Mayo and Independiente de Rio Colorado in his home country, Municipal Tiquipaya and Aurora in Bolivia and Portuguesa in Brazil, aside for a two-month spell back at Lemos.
