= Modou Jadama =

Gambian footballer (1994–2024)

Personal information
- Full name: Modou Lamin Jadama
- Date of birth: 17 March 1994
- Place of birth: Serrekunda, The Gambia
- Date of death: 2 October 2024 (aged 30)
- Place of death: United States
- Height: 1.85 m (6 ft 1 in)
- Position: Centre-back

Youth career
- 2012–2013: Universidad de Chile
- 2013–2014: Colo-Colo

Senior career*
Years	Team	Apps	(Gls)
2013–2014	Colo-Colo B	5	(0)
2014–2016	Colo-Colo	0	(0)
2016	→ Coquimbo Unido (loan)	3	(0)
2017	Tulsa Roughnecks	31	(1)
2018–2019	Portland Timbers	2	(0)
2018–2019	Portland Timbers 2	42	(5)
2020	Atlanta United 2	16	(0)
2021	FC Tulsa	24	(0)
2022	Hartford Athletic	28	(0)
2024	Georgia FC	4	(0)
Total		155	(6)
- * Club domestic league appearances and goals

Modou Lamin Jadama (17 March 1994 – 2 October 2024), also known as Mou Jadama, was a Gambian footballer who played as a centre-back.

== Career ==
=== Early career ===
Born in Serrekunda of The Gambia, Jadama moved to Atlanta, Georgia when he was 9 years old. At the age of 10, he got selected for a team called Stars, introduced to him by his cousin. He played varsity football for 3 years for Milton High School and also the Norcross Soccer Academy. He was also an Olympic Development Program (ODP) player from 2007-2010. Jadama also trained with Elon University, but soon left to join Universidad de Chile.

=== Chile ===
Jadama signed with Universidad de Chile in 2012, soon returning to the U.S. to finish high school but returned to play for their reserve team. After that, he went to train in Italy and Leipzig but left to play for Colo-Colo in August 2013, signing a 2 year contract with their reserve team in the 2013–14 Segunda División Profesional. He won the U19 league in the 2014 season, and was promoted to the first team in January 2015.

In February 2015, he played for the Colo-Colo first team against Santiago Wanderers in the Santo Tomás Cup, which his team won by penalties. He also played a total of 92 minutes in two matches of the 2015 Copa Chile, against Huachipato and Ñublense. However, he tore his medial collateral ligament and was loaned to second division team Coquimbo Unido in 2016, due to a new limit on the amount foreigners allowed in a team. He made his debut in a 1-0 win against Deportes Puerto Montt, but only made three more appearances throughout the year before his loan ended. Jadama and Colo-Colo mutually agreed that he would leave at the end of the 2016 season.

=== Tulsa Roughnecks ===
On 8 March 2017, Jadama signed with USL Championship team Tulsa Roughnecks (now known as FC Tulsa). He made his debut on 1 April 2017, in a 1-0 win against the Rio Grande Valley FC Toros. Over the course of the 2017 season, he would become an important member for Tulsa Roughnecks, making 31 appearances at defense and scoring one goal.

=== Portland Timbers ===
Jadama's good performances for Tulsa Roughnecks rewarded him with a move to Major League Soccer team Portland Timbers, signing on 24 January 2018. He made his first-team debut in a 2-0 win over San Jose Earthquakes in the U.S. Open Cup and made his MLS debut on 9 June 2018, in a 0-0 draw against Sporting Kansas City, coming on for Marco Farfan. He would make the majority of his appearances for the reserve team, making 42 appearances over two seasons from 2018-2019 and being named captain.

=== Atlanta United ===
On 22 January 2020, Jadama signed with fellow MLS team Atlanta United FC. He would make 16 appearances over the 2020 season for their second team and was also named captain. His contract expired at the end of the 2020 season.

=== Return to Tulsa ===
On 21 January 2021, Jadama returned with the now named FC Tulsa (previously Tulsa Roughnecks). He made 24 appearances over the 2021 USL season, 22 of them being starts.

=== Later career ===
Jadama signed with Hartford Athletic of the USL Championship on 24 January 2022. He made his debut in a 2-1 loss against Pittsburgh Riverhounds SC on 19 March 2022. Over the course of the season, he would make 28 appearances with the team. He would also play with Georgia Lions of the National Independent Soccer Association.

== Death ==
Jadama died in the United States in a car accident on 2 October 2024, at the age of 30.
