= Francisco Ugarte (footballer, born 1986) =

German-Chilean footballer

Personal information
- Full name: Francisco Patricio Ugarte Janietz
- Date of birth: 15 December 1986 (age 39)
- Place of birth: Nürtingen, West Germany
- Height: 1.86 m (6 ft 1 in)
- Position: Defender

Youth career
- SSV Reutlingen 05
- Stuttgarter Kickers
- VfB Stuttgart

Senior career*
Years	Team	Apps	(Gls)
2010	Palestino	0	(0)
2011	Deportes Copiapó	9	(0)
2012	Fernández Vial	15	(1)
2013–2014	San Luis	13	(2)
2014	Limón	3	(0)
2015–2016	TSG Balingen	1	(0)
2015–2016	TSG Balingen II	6	(0)
2016–2017	FC 07 Albstadt	29	(2)
2017–2018	Tulsa Roughnecks	38	(1)
2018–2019	Magallanes	20	(0)
2020–2021	Independiente de Cauquenes	14	(1)
2021	San Antonio Unido	16	(1)
Total		164	(8)

Managerial career
- 2022: Santiago Wanderers (assistant)
- * Club domestic league appearances and goals

Francisco Patricio Ugarte Janietz (born 15 December 1986), is a German-Chilean former professional footballer who played as a defender.

== Coaching career ==
Following his retirement, he joined the technical staff of Miguel Ponce in Santiago Wanderers as assistant coach.

== Personal life ==
Born in Germany to a Chilean father and a German mother, he holds dual nationality: German–Chilean. In Spanish, his last name Janietz is known as Nieto.
