= Ricardo Berna =

Brazilian footballer (born 1979)

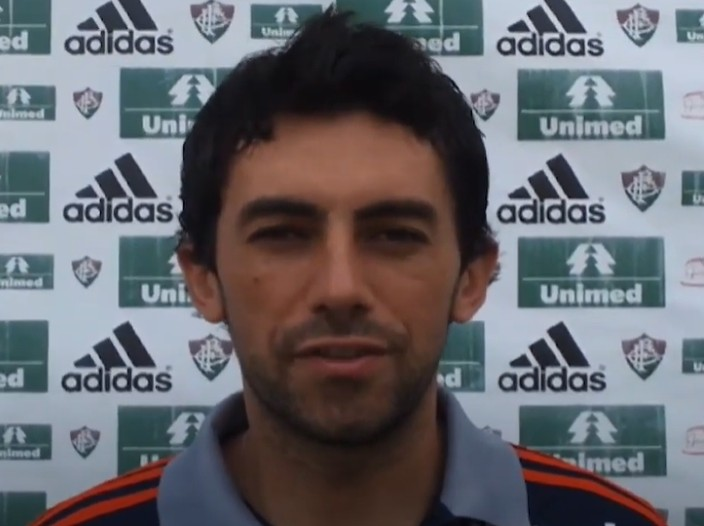

Personal information
- Full name: Ricardo Ferreira Berna
- Date of birth: 11 June 1979 (age 47)
- Place of birth: São Paulo, Brazil
- Height: 1.88 m (6 ft 2 in)
- Position: Goalkeeper

Youth career
- 1995–1998: Vegalta Sendai

Senior career*
Years	Team	Apps	(Gls)
1998	Vegalta Sendai	0	(0)
1998–2000	Guarani		
2000–2002	América Mineiro		
2003	União São João		
2003	Portuguesa Santista		(1)
2004–2005	América Mineiro		
2005–2013	Fluminense	48	(0)
2013	Náutico	25	(0)
2015	Macaé	6	(0)
2015–2016	Fortaleza	26	(0)
2017–2018	Portuguesa	22	(0)
2018	Taboão da Serra	12	(0)
- * Club domestic league appearances and goals

Ricardo Ferreira Berna (born 11 June 1979) is a Brazilian former footballer who played as a goalkeeper.

== Honours ==
América Mineiro

- Copa Sul-Minas: 2000
- Campeonato Mineiro: 2001

Fluminense

- Copa do Brasil: 2007
- Campeonato Brasileiro Série A: 2010, 2012
- Campeonato Carioca: 2012
- Taça Guanabara: 2012

Fortaleza

- Campeonato Cearense: 2016
