= Gabriel Santos (footballer, born 1983) =

Brazilian footballer

Personal information
- Full name: Gabriel dos Santos Nascimento
- Date of birth: 5 March 1983 (age 43)
- Place of birth: Porto Alegre, Brazil
- Height: 1.86 m (6 ft 1 in)
- Position: Centre back

Youth career
- 2000–2002: Ponte Preta

Senior career*
Years	Team	Apps	(Gls)
2003	Ponte Preta	34	(1)
2004	Palmeiras	26	(0)
2005–2006	→ Fluminense (loan)	48	(6)
2007	Sport	7	(0)
2007–2008	Hapoel Tel Aviv	13	(1)
2008–2009	Sport	11	(0)
2010–2012	América Mineiro	86	(6)
2013	Sport	19	(4)
2014	Ceará	1	(0)
2015	Caldas Novas	6	(0)
2015	Icasa	5	(1)
2016	Villa Nova	9	(1)
2016	Tupi	21	(0)
2017	São Bento	12	(1)
2017–2018	Portuguesa	6	(1)
2019	Nacional SP	0	(0)
- * Club domestic league appearances and goals

Gabriel dos Santos Nascimento (born 5 March 1983), known as Gabriel Santos, is a Brazilian former footballer who played as a centre back. He began his career with Ponte Preta. He played for Palmeiras, who loaned him first to Fluminense and then to Sport. His time in Recife was cut short after seven games when Palmeiras sold him to Hapoel Tel Aviv. After a period in Hapoel Tel Aviv which ended in January 2008, he came back to Recife.

== Honours ==
=== Club ===
Sport

- Copa do Brasil: 2008

=== International ===
Brazil U20

- FIFA U-20 World Cup: 2003
