= Rodolfo (footballer, born October 1993) =

Brazilian footballer

Personal information
- Full name: Rodolfo Freitas da Silva
- Date of birth: 4 October 1993 (age 33)
- Place of birth: Orindiúva, Brazil
- Height: 1.84 m (6 ft 1/2 in)
- Position: Forward

Team information
- Current team: Rio Preto

Youth career
- –2013: Rio Claro
- 2010: → Grêmio (loan)
- 2012: → Osvaldo Cruz (loan)

Senior career*
Years	Team	Apps	(Gls)
2014–2018	Palmeiras	2	(0)
2015	→ Rio Claro (loan)	4	(0)
2015	→ Oeste (loan)	1	(0)
2016	→ Ypiranga-RS (loan)	7	(0)
2017	→ Portuguesa (loan)	5	(0)
2018	→ Fresno FC (loan)	5	(0)
2018	→ Atlanta United 2 (loan)	3	(0)
2020–	Rio Preto	9	(0)
- * Club domestic league appearances and goals as of 10 April 2020

Rodolfo Freitas da Silva (born 4 October 1993), simply known as Rodolfo, is a Brazilian footballer who plays as a forward for Rio Preto.
