= Fabián Cerda =

Chilean footballer (born 1989)

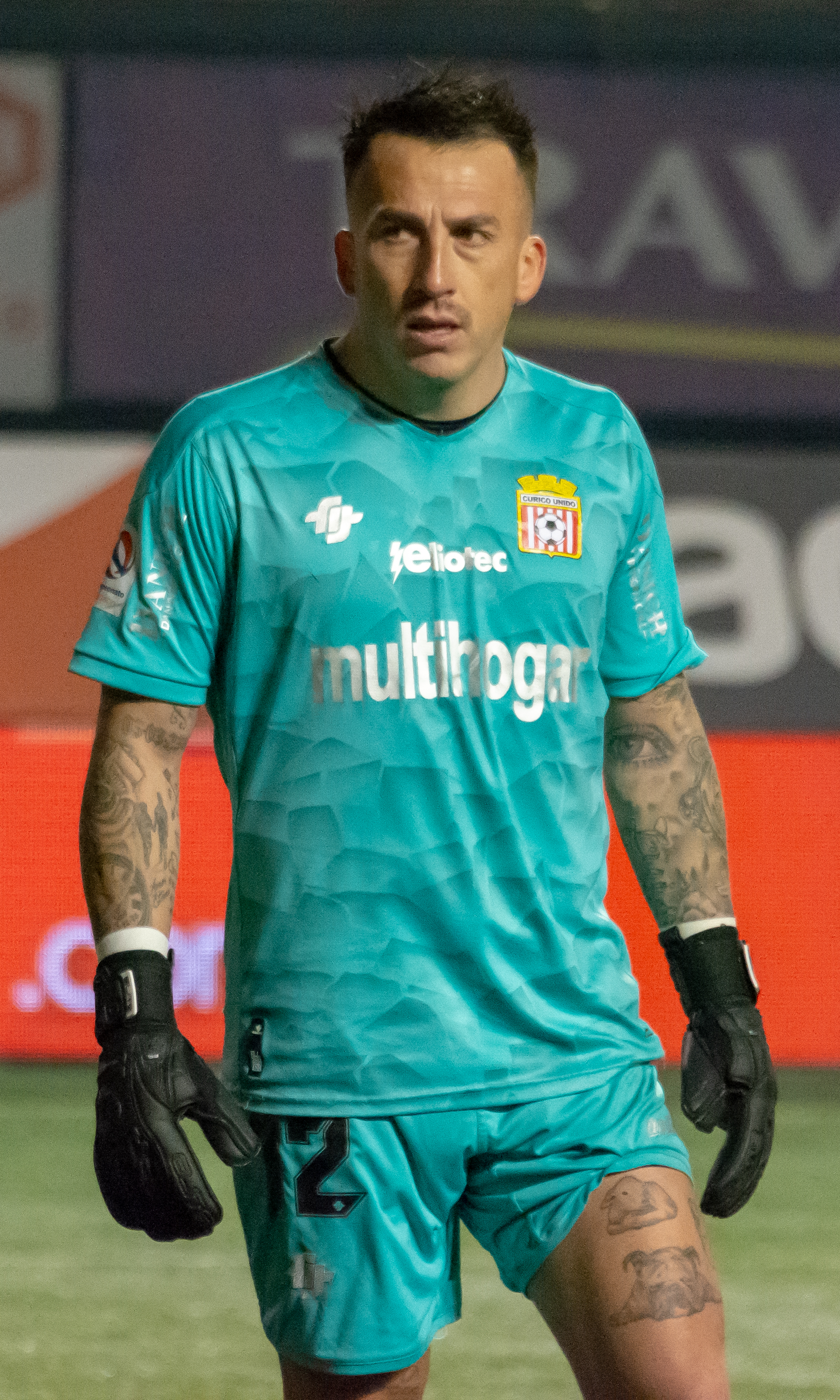
- Cerda with Curicó Unido in 2023

Personal information
- Full name: Fabián Alfredo Cerda Valdés
- Date of birth: February 7, 1989 (age 37)
- Place of birth: Santiago, Chile
- Height: 1.83 m (6 ft 0 in)
- Position: Goalkeeper

Team information
- Current team: Rangers

Youth career
- 1998–2009: Universidad Católica

Senior career*
Years	Team	Apps	(Gls)
2009–2015	Universidad Católica	6	(0)
2014	→ Cobresal (loan)	3	(0)
2015–2017	Trasandino	42	(0)
2017–2018	Tulsa Roughnecks	54	(0)
2019	Palestino	17	(0)
2020–2023	Curicó Unido	91	(0)
2024	Deportes Antofagasta	12	(0)
2024	Huachipato	8	(0)
2025	Deportes La Serena	11	(0)
2026–	Rangers	0	(0)

International career
2008	Chile U18		
2009	Chile U20		
- * Club domestic league appearances and goals as of 3 August 2026

Fabián Alfredo Cerda Valdés (born February 7, 1989), is a Chilean football goalkeeper who plays for Rangers de Talca.

== Club career ==
In 2017–18, Cerda played for Tulsa Roughnecks in the United States.

Cerda spent four seasons with Curicó Unido until December 2023.

Cerda joined Deportes La Serena for the 2025 season.

A free agent during the first half of 2026, Cerda signed with Rangers de Talca on 3 August 2026.

== International career ==
Along with Chile U18 he won the 2008 João Havelange Tournament. The next year, he was part of the Chile U20 squad at the 2009 South American U-20 Championship.

== Personal life ==
His nephew, Axel Cerda, is a player from the Universidad Católica youth ranks who won the 2022 Chilean Youth Championship at under-16 level along with the team.

== Honours ==
Universidad Católica

- Primera División de Chile (1): 2010
- Copa Chile (1): 2011

Chile U18

- João Havelange Tournament (1): 2008
