= 2016 Swope Park Rangers season =

Swope Park Rangers
2016 season
- General manager: Kurt Austin
- Head coach: Marc Dos Santos
- Stadium: Swope Soccer Village
- USL: Conference: 4th
- USL Playoffs: Championship final
- Top goalscorer: Mark Anthony Gonzalez (5)
- Highest home attendance: 6,812 (Mar. 26 vs. Portland 2 at Children's Mercy Park)
- Lowest home attendance: 926 (Jun. 8 vs. Rio Grande Valley)
- Average home league attendance: 2,348
Home colors	Away colors

The 2016 Swope Park Rangers season was the club's inaugural year of existence, and their first season in the Western Conference of the United Soccer League, the third tier of the United States soccer pyramid.

== Roster ==
As of March 25, 2016. Note: Flags indicate national team as defined under FIFA eligibility rules; some limited exceptions apply. Players may hold more than one non-FIFA nationality.

No.	Pos.	Nation	Player
1	GK	USA	Jon Kempin (HGP; on loan from Sporting Kansas City)
26	DF	USA	Tommy Meyer
28	GK	USA	Zac Lubin
30	FW	HUN	Dániel Sallói (HGP; on loan from Sporting Kansas City)
31	MF	NGR	Nansel Selbol
32	MF	USA	Christian Duke (Captain)
33	DF	USA	Jacob VanCompernolle
35	MF	BRA	Ualefi
44	MF	ESA	Tomás Granitto
47	FW	CAN	Mark Anthony Gonzalez
49	MF	USA	Will Little III
50	FW	USA	Kris Tyrpak
55	DF	CAN	Amer Didic
56	DF	USA	Ezra Armstrong
67	DF	USA	Jaylin Lindsey
74	MF	USA	Jimmy Mulligan (on loan from New York Cosmos)
77	MF	CAN	Tyler Pasher
81	DF	MLI	Oumar Ballo
88	MF	CPV	Kévin Oliveira
90	DF	CAN	Johnny Grant
92	MF	USA	Alex Molano
98	GK	USA	Steven Tekesky
99	FW	JAM	Dane Kelly
--	MF	BRA	Ayrton

=== Staff ===
- (Canada) Marc Dos Santos – Head Coach
- (Serbia) Nikola Popovic – Assistant Coach
- (United States) Alec Dufty – Goalkeeping Coach
- (United States) Josh McAllister – Fitness Coach

== Competitions ==
=== Preseason ===
Win Draw Loss

February 17, 2016 DDC 1	Colorado Rapids	1–3	Swope Park Rangers	Tucson, Arizona
18:30 (CDT)	Badji 19'; Watts (yellow card) 44'	Report	Tyrpak 1'; VanCompernolle (yellow card) 18'; Sanchez 63'; Little 90'	Stadium: Kino Sports Complex North Stadium; Referee: Baboucarr Jallow

February 20, 2016 DDC 2	Arizona United SC	0–0	Swope Park Rangers	Tucson, Arizona
(CDT)	Gavin (yellow card) 17'; Johnson (yellow card) 73'	Report	Kelly (yellow card) 28'; Diaw (yellow card) 65'	Stadium: Kino Sports Complex North Stadium; Referee: Robi Hullner

February 24, 2016 DDC 3	Swope Park Rangers	2–2	Columbus Crew SC	Tucson, Arizona
(CDT)	Granitto 38'; Gonzalez 90'	Report	Higuaín 35'; Barson (yellow card) 57'; Finlay 66'; Wahl (yellow card) 72'	Stadium: Kino Sports Complex North Stadium; Referee: Drew Fisher

February 27, 2016 DDC 4	FC Tucson	0–1	Swope Park Rangers	Tucson, Arizona
17:00 (CDT)	Guerra (yellow card) 73'	Report	Kelly 32'	Stadium: Kino Sports Complex North Stadium; Referee: Noah Kenyawani

March 12, 2016 Scrimmage 1	Swope Park Rangers	4–1	Rockhurst Hawks	Kansas City, Missouri
15:00 (CDT)	Pasher 5'; Didic 19'; Tyrpak 27'; Gonzalez 74'; Selbol (yellow card) 78'	Report	Gianluca Bottoni 22'; Tom McDonald (yellow card) 57'	Stadium: Swope Soccer Village; Referee: Jon Freemon

March 19, 2016 Scrimmage 2	Swope Park Rangers	1–2	Creighton Bluejays	Kansas City, Missouri
19:00 (CDT)	Gonzalez 7'	Report	DeJulio 20'; Englis 37'; Rydstrand (yellow card) 57'	Stadium: Swope Soccer Village; Referee: Kevin Diemer

April 16, 2016 Scrimmage 3	Swope Park Rangers	0–1	Tulsa Golden Hurricane	Kansas City, Missouri
16:00 (CDT)	Lindsey (yellow card) 55'; Sallói (yellow card) 61'	Report	Sanchez 9'; Rocha (yellow card) 61'	Stadium: Swope Soccer Village; Referee: Jack Feldman

=== USL Regular season ===
==== Standings ====
Pos	Team	Pld	W	D	L	GF	GA	GD	Pts	Qualification
2	Rio Grande Valley Toros	30	14	9	7	47	24	+23	51	Conference Playoffs
3	Colorado Springs Switchbacks	30	14	7	9	37	27	+10	49	Conference Playoffs
4	Swope Park Rangers	30	14	6	10	45	36	+9	48	Conference Playoffs
5	LA Galaxy II	30	12	11	7	52	42	+10	47	Conference Playoffs
6	Vancouver Whitecaps 2	30	12	9	9	44	44	0	45	Conference Playoffs

Source: 2016 USL Standings
Rules for classification: 1) total wins; 2) total goal differential; 3) total goals scored; 4) points earned against top four Conference finishers; 5) disciplinary points; 6) coin toss or drawing of lots

==== Matches ====
Win Draw Loss Upcoming fixture

March 26, 2016 USL 1	Swope Park Rangers	2–1	Portland Timbers 2	Kansas City, Kansas
19:30 (CDT)	Oliveira 48' (pen.) (yellow card) 54'; Sallói 90+1'	Report	Bijev (yellow card) 38'; Besler 90+1'	Stadium: Children's Mercy Park; Attendance: 6,812; Referee: Jon Freemon

April 2, 2016 USL 2	Tulsa Roughnecks FC	1–2	Swope Park Rangers	Tulsa, Oklahoma
19:00 (CDT)	Morgan 90+5'	Report	Kelly 11'; Selbol 90+3'	Stadium: ONEOK Field; Attendance: 4,103; Referee: Andrew Musashe

April 9, 2016 USL 3	San Antonio FC	1–1	Swope Park Rangers	San Antonio, Texas
19:30 (CDT)	Garcia 42'; Reed (yellow card) 73'; Araujo (yellow card) 90+4'	Report	Sallói 2'; Meyer (yellow card) 59'	Stadium: Toyota Field; Attendance: 8,466; Referee: Michael Lavergne

April 23, 2016 USL 4	Oklahoma City Energy FC	1–0	Swope Park Rangers	Oklahoma City, Oklahoma
19:00 (CDT)	Ryden 22'	Report	Duke (yellow card) 36'; Selbol (yellow card) 63'; Oliveira (yellow card) 82'	Stadium: Taft Stadium; Attendance: 5,690; Referee: Luis Guardia

April 27, 2016 USL 5	Swope Park Rangers	1–2	Whitecaps FC 2	Kansas City, Missouri
19:00 (CDT)	Tyrpak 15' (yellow card) 39'; Mulligan (yellow card) 48'; Quintillà (yellow card) 58'	Report	Greig 30' (pen.); Haber (yellow card) 42'; McKendry (yellow card) 53' (goal) 55'	Stadium: Swope Soccer Village; Attendance: 1,524; Referee: Elvis Mahmutovic

May 7, 2016 USL 6	Saint Louis FC	3–0	Swope Park Rangers	Fenton, Missouri
19:30 (CDT)	Tshuma 11'; Bond 39' (yellow card) 43' (yellow-red card) 79'; Herrera 52'	Report	Ballo (yellow card) 17' (yellow-red card) 45'	Stadium: World Wide Technology Soccer Park; Attendance: 5,023; Referee: Luigi Lazareno

May 14, 2016 USL 7	Swope Park Rangers	2–1	Tulsa Roughnecks FC	Kansas City, Missouri
19:30 (CDT)	Pasher 47', 81'	Report	Ochoa 79'; Whatley (yellow card) 81'	Stadium: Swope Soccer Village; Attendance: 1,163; Referee: Michael Lavergne

May 21, 2016 USL 8	Rio Grande Valley FC Toros	4–1	Swope Park Rangers	Edinburg, Texas
19:30 (CDT)	Rodriguez 13', 26'; Escalante (yellow card) 45'; Greene (yellow card) 51'; Ward (yellow card) 81'; Lovejoy 89'; Montoya 90'	Report	Sallói 40'; Oliveira (yellow card) 49'	Stadium: UTRGV Soccer and Track Complex; Attendance: 2,065; Referee: Victor Rivas

May 28, 2016 USL 9	Sacramento Republic FC	1–1	Swope Park Rangers	Sacramento, California
21:30 (CDT)	Foran (yellow card) 32'; Cazarez (yellow card) 66'; Iwasa 76'	Report	Pasher (yellow card) 60'; Oliveira 73'; Ualefi (yellow card) 85'; Mulligan (yellow card) 86'	Stadium: Bonney Field; Attendance: 11,569; Referee: Joseph Dickerson

June 4, 2016 USL 10	Portland Timbers 2	2–1	Swope Park Rangers	Meridian, Idaho
20:00 (CDT)	Brett 27'; Gallagher (yellow card) 55'; Arboleda 70'	Report	Gonzalez 80'	Stadium: Rocky Mountain High School; Attendance: 4,352; Referee: Tyler Ploeger

June 8, 2016 USL 11	Swope Park Rangers	4–0	Rio Grande Valley FC Toros	Kansas City, Missouri
19:30 (CDT)	Gonzalez 23', 27'; Oliveira 43'; Sallói 70'	Report		Stadium: Swope Soccer Village; Attendance: 926; Referee: Guido Gonzales Jr.

June 12, 2016 USL 12	Vancouver Whitecaps FC 2	3–2	Swope Park Rangers	Vancouver, British Columbia
16:00 (CST)	Bustos 5', 23'; Greig (yellow card) 38'; McKendry (yellow card) 57'; Adekugbe (yellow card) 77'; Davies 80'	Report	Ayrton (yellow card) 15'; Ualefi (yellow card) 26'; Mulligan (yellow card) 77'; Gonzalez 86'; Tyrpak 88'	Stadium: Thunderbird Stadium; Attendance: 1,494; Referee: Alain Ruch

June 18, 2016 USL 13	Swope Park Rangers	1–3	Oklahoma City Energy FC	Kansas City, Missouri
19:30 (CDT)	Ayrton 7' (yellow card) 38'; Kelly (yellow card) 43'; Ualefi (yellow card) 75'	Report	Thomas 45'; Wojcik 64'; Gonzalez 74'; König (yellow card) 80'	Stadium: Swope Soccer Village; Attendance: 1,314; Referee: Jon Freemon

June 26, 2016 USL 14	Seattle Sounders FC 2	0–2	Swope Park Rangers	Tukwila, Washington
19:00 (CST)	Delem (yellow card) 62'	Report	Molano (yellow card) 3'; Kelly (yellow card) 46'; Tyrpak 65'; Grant (yellow card) 85'; Gonzalez 88'	Stadium: Starfire Sports Complex; Attendance: 1,309; Referee: Victor Rivas

July 2, 2016 USL 15	Swope Park Rangers	1–0	Saint Louis FC	Kansas City, Missouri
19:30 (CDT)	Pasher 2'	Report	Hardware (yellow card) 45'; Bond (yellow card) 65'	Stadium: Swope Soccer Village; Attendance: 933; Referee: Sorin Stoica

July 9, 2016 USL 16	Arizona United SC	1–1	Swope Park Rangers	Peoria, Arizona
21:30 (CST)	Tan 17' (pen.); West (yellow card) 35'; Rooney (yellow card) 53'; Silva (red card) 63'; Garza (yellow card) 85'	Report	Tyrpak 31' (pen.); Didic (yellow card) 49'; Ayrton (red card) 63'; Duke (yellow card) 76'; Pasher (yellow card) 82'; Ballo (yellow card) 90+1'	Stadium: Peoria Sports Complex; Attendance: 1,012; Referee: Daniel Radford

July 12, 2016 USL 17	Swope Park Rangers	0–2	Oklahoma City Energy FC	Kansas City, Missouri
19:30 (CDT)	Duke (yellow card) 6'	Report	Craft 84'; Pitter 89'	Stadium: Swope Soccer Village; Attendance: 1,233; Referee: Rosendo Mendoza

July 20, 2016 USL 18	Colorado Springs Switchbacks FC	1–1	Swope Park Rangers	Colorado Springs, Colorado
20:00 (CST)	Suggs (yellow card) 37'; Seth 60'; González (yellow card) 70'	Report	Myers (yellow card) 34'; Alvarado (yellow card) 68'; Tyrpak (yellow card) 72'; Molano (yellow card) 84' (goal) 90+1'	Stadium: Switchbacks Stadium; Attendance: 2,212; Referee: Chipalo Street

July 23, 2016 USL 19	Swope Park Rangers	3–0	Orange County Blues FC	Kansas City, Missouri
19:30 (CDT)	Alvarado (yellow card) 28'; Kelly 43'; Gonzalez 78'; Grant 81'	Report	Meesu (yellow card) 49'; Sheldon (yellow card) 90'; Mirković (yellow card) 90+1'	Stadium: Swope Soccer Village; Attendance: 1,068; Referee: Jon Freemon

July 30, 2016 USL 20	Swope Park Rangers	2–1	San Antonio FC	Kansas City, Missouri
19:30 (CDT)	Ualefi (yellow card) 3'; Alvarado (yellow card) 48'; Kelly 71'; Gonzalez 84'	Report	Reed 30'; Johnson (yellow card) 65'; Bradnock-Brennan (yellow card) 76'	Stadium: Swope Soccer Village; Attendance: 1,448; Referee: Luis Guardia

August 3, 2016 USL 21	Saint Louis FC	1–1	Swope Park Rangers	Fenton, Missouri
19:00 (CDT)	Cochran (yellow card) 53'; Herrera 65' (pen.); David (yellow card) 68'	Report	Meyer (yellow card) 20'; Rubio 34'; Didic (yellow card) 64'	Stadium: World Wide Technology Soccer Park; Attendance: 4,582; Referee: Andrew Musashe

August 6, 2016 USL 22	Tulsa Roughnecks FC	v	Swope Park Rangers	Tulsa, Oklahoma
19:30 (CDT)		Report		Stadium: ONEOK Field
Note: Postponed due to unsafe field conditions.

August 13, 2016 USL 23	Real Monarchs	1-0	Swope Park Rangers	Salt Lake City, Utah
20:00 (CDT)	Orozco 8'; Moberg (yellow card); Sundly (yellow card); Amankona (yellow card)	Summary	Ayrton (yellow card); Tyrpak (yellow card)	Stadium: Rio Tinto Stadium

August 21, 2016 USL 24	Swope Park Rangers	1-1	Saint Louis FC	Kansas City, Kansas
18:00 (CDT)	Barrett 89' (yellow card) 89'	Summary	Musa (yellow card) 4'; Roberts (yellow card) 71'; Cicciarelli 80'	Stadium: Children's Mercy Park

August 27, 2016 USL 25	Swope Park Rangers	2-1	LA Galaxy II	Kansas City, Missouri
19:30 (CDT)	Duke 16'; Gonzalez 25'; Ayrton (yellow card) 47'; Kelly (yellow card) 80'; Adrian Zendejas (yellow card) 90+2'	Summary	Jamieson 2'; Villarreal (yellow card) 45+2'; Sorto (yellow card) 47'; Zubak (yellow card) 56'; Villarreal (yellow card) 68'	Stadium: Swope Soccer Village

August 31, 2016 USL 26	Swope Park Rangers	2-1	San Antonio FC	Kansas City, Missouri
19:30 (CDT)	Ayrton 3' 90+5' (pen.); Didic (yellow card) 80'	Summary	Okiomah 8'; Bradnock-Brennan (yellow card) 71'	Stadium: Swope Soccer Village

September 3, 2016 USL 27	Swope Park Rangers	0-2	Rio Grande Valley FC Toros	Kansas City, Missouri
19:30 (CDT)	Ualefi (yellow card) 48'; Didic (yellow card) 78'; Rubio (yellow card) 88'	Summary	Luna 8'; García (yellow card) 50'; Casner 67'; Bird (yellow card) 75'	Stadium: Swope Soccer Village

September 10, 2016 USL 28	Swope Park Rangers	2-0	Tulsa Roughnecks FC	Kansas City, Missouri
19:30 (CDT)				Stadium: Swope Soccer Village

September 18, 2016 USL 29	Oklahoma City Energy FC	0-3	Swope Park Rangers	Oklahoma City, Oklahoma
18:00 (CDT)				Stadium: Taft Stadium

September 24, 2016 USL 30	Swope Park Rangers	2-0	Seattle Sounders FC 2	Kansas City, Missouri
19:00 (CDT)				Stadium: Swope Soccer Village
