= 2016 Desert Diamond Cup =

Tournament details
- Host country: United States
- Dates: February 17 − February 27
- Teams: 9
- Venues: 2 (in 1 host city)

Final positions
- Champions: New England Revolution (1st title)
- Runners-up: Columbus Crew SC

Tournament statistics
- Matches played: 15
- Goals scored: 43 (2.87 per match)
- Top scorer(s): Teal Bunbury; Kei Kamara (3 goals)
- Best player: Teal Bunbury

The 2016 Desert Diamond Cup was a soccer exhibition featuring six soccer teams from Major League Soccer, two from the United Soccer League and host FC Tucson from the Premier Development League, held from February 17 to February 27, 2016. It is the 6th annual Desert Diamond Cup.

== Teams ==
The following nine clubs participated in the 2016 tournament:

- New England Revolution (fifth appearance)
- Real Salt Lake (fifth appearance)
- FC Tucson (fourth appearance)
- Colorado Rapids (third appearance)
- Sporting Kansas City (third appearance)
- Arizona United SC (first appearance)
- Columbus Crew SC (first appearance)
- Houston Dynamo (first appearance)
- Swope Park Rangers (first appearance)

== Table standings ==
Pos	Team	Pld	W	D	L	GF	GA	GD	Pts
1	Swope Park Rangers	4	2	2	0	6	3	+3	8
2	New England Revolution	4	2	2	0	7	5	+2	8
3	Sporting Kansas City	4	1	3	0	9	6	+3	6
4	Arizona United SC	3	1	1	1	3	4	−1	4
5	Colorado Rapids	4	1	1	2	5	7	−2	4
6	Columbus Crew	4	0	3	1	5	6	−1	3
7	Real Salt Lake	2	0	2	0	4	4	0	2
8	Houston Dynamo	3	0	2	1	3	4	−1	2
9	FC Tucson	2	0	0	2	1	4	−3	0

== Matches ==
The tournament featured a round-robin group stage followed by fifth-place, third-place and championship matches.

=== Tournament ===
February 17 Game 1	Swope Park Rangers	3–1	Colorado Rapids	Tucson, Arizona
17:30 MST	Tyrpak 1'; VanCompernolle (yellow card) 18'; Sanchez 63'; Little 90+'	Report	Badji 18'; Watts (yellow card) 44'	Stadium: Kino North Stadium; Referee: Baboucarr Jallow

February 17 Game 2	Sporting Kansas City	2–2	Columbus Crew SC	Tucson, Arizona
18:00 MST	Quintilla (yellow card) 40'; Mustivar 52'; Hajderovic 88'	Report; Report	Kamara 46', 74'	Stadium: Kino North Grandstand; Referee: Alex Chilowicz

February 17 Game 3	New England Revolution	3–3	Real Salt Lake	Tucson, Arizona
20:00 MST	Gamble 13'; Davies 48' (pen.), 84'; Woodberry (yellow card) 81' (red card) 83'	Report	Morales (yellow card) 23' (goal) 54' (pen.); Maund (red card) 47'; Olave 68'; Garcia 77'	Stadium: Kino North Stadium

February 20 Game 4	Arizona United SC	0–0	Swope Park Rangers	Tucson, Arizona
16:30 MST	Gavin (yellow card) 17'; Johnson (yellow card) 73'	Report	Kelly (yellow card) 28'; Diaw (yellow card) 65'	Stadium: Kino North Grandstand; Referee: Robi Hullner

February 20 Game 5	Real Salt Lake	1–1	Columbus Crew SC	Tucson, Arizona
17:00 MST	Allen 17'; Wingert (yellow card) 25'; Garcia (yellow card) 51'	Report	Kamara 26'	Stadium: Kino North Stadium; Referee: Edvin Jurisevic

February 20 Game 6	Colorado Rapids	0–0	Houston Dynamo	Tucson, Arizona
19:00 MST		Report		Stadium: Kino North Grandstand; Referee: Baldomero Toledo

February 20 Game 7	Sporting Kansas City	1–1	New England Revolution	Tucson, Arizona
19:30 MST	Zusi 11'	Report	Bunbury 58'; Herivaux (yellow card) 75'	Stadium: Kino North Stadium; Referee: Chris Penso

February 24 Game 8	FC Tucson	1–3	Arizona United SC	Tucson, Arizona
15:30 MST	Bevans 50'	Report	Bardsley 38'; Cortez 65', 67'	Stadium: Kino North Grandstand

February 24 Game 9	New England Revolution	2–1	Houston Dynamo	Tucson, Arizona
17:30 MST	Bunbury 48'; Neumann 69'; Herivaux (yellow card) 73'; Gamble (yellow card) 87'	Report	Agus (yellow card) 61'; Torres 67'; Rocha (yellow card) 82'	Stadium: Kino North Stadium

February 24 Game 10	Columbus Crew SC	2–2	Swope Park Rangers	Tucson, Arizona
18:00 MST	Higuain 35'; Barson (yellow card) 58'; Finlay 67'; Wahl (yellow card) 72'	Report	Granitto 38'; Gonzalez 90'	Stadium: Kino North Grandstand; Referee: Drew Fisher

February 24 Game 11	Sporting Kansas City	4–1	Colorado Rapids	Tucson, Arizona
20:00 MST	Nagamura 16' (pen.), 19' (pen.); Dwyer 68' (pen.); Sinovic 72'	Report	Pfeffer 82'	Stadium: Kino North Stadium

=== Finals ===
February 27 Game 12	FC Tucson	0–1	Swope Park Rangers	Tucson, Arizona
16:00 MST	Guerra (yellow card) 73'	Report	Kelly 32'	Stadium: Kino North Grandstand; Referee: Noah Kenyawani

February 27 3rd Place Game	Houston Dynamo	2–2	Sporting Kansas City	Tucson, Arizona
16:30 MST	Barnes 31'; Torres 77'	Report	Coelho 16'; Sallói 55'	Stadium: Kino North Stadium

February 27 5th Place Game	Colorado Rapids	3–0	Arizona United SC	Tucson, Arizona
18:30 MST	Ringhof 17' (o.g.); Doyle 31'; Gashi 63'	Report		Stadium: Kino North Grandstand; Referee: Ismail Elfath

February 27 Championship Game	New England Revolution	1–0	Columbus Crew SC	Tucson, Arizona
19:00 MST	Bunbury 21'	Report		Stadium: Kino North Stadium

== Goalscorers ==
=== Top scorers ===
Rank	Player	Nation	Club	Goals
1	Teal Bunbury	USA	New England Revolution	3
1	Kei Kamara	SLE	Columbus Crew SC	3
3	Chris Cortez	USA	Arizona United SC	2
3	Paulo Nagamura	BRA	Sporting Kansas City	2
3	Erick Torres	MEX	Houston Dynamo	2
6	30 players			1

== Awards ==
CARF International MVP: Teal Bunbury (NEW)
TEP Copper Boot (Leading Scorer): Kei Kamara (COL)
