= 2016 USL season =

6th season the USL

United Soccer League
- Season: 2016
- Champions: New York Red Bulls II (1st Title)
- Regular Season Title: New York Red Bulls II (1st Title)
- Matches: 435
- Goals: 1,140 (2.62 per match)
- Best player: (United States) Sean Okoli FC Cincinnati
- Top goalscorer: (United States) Sean Okoli FC Cincinnati (16 Goals)
- Best goalkeeper: (United States) Mitch Hildebrandt FC Cincinnati
- Biggest home win: STL 7–1 TUL (June 11); RGV 6–0 SEA (August 13)
- Biggest away win: HAR 0–5 NYR (August 2); TUL 0–5 RGV (August 18)
- Highest scoring: STL 7–1 TUL (June 11)
- Longest winning run: 7 games New York Red Bulls II (August 2 – September 7)
- Longest unbeaten run: 17 games Louisville City (April 9 – July 17)
- Longest losing run: 8 games FC Montreal (March 25 – May 21)
- Highest attendance: 24,376; CIN 1–0 ORL (September 17 – USL regular season record); 30,187; CIN 1–2 CHS (October 2 – USL all-time and postseason record)
- Lowest attendance: 58 at MON (date and opponent unknown)
- Total attendance: 1,496,493
- Average attendance: 3,439
- All statistics correct as of September 25, 2016.

The 2016 USL season was the sixth season of the United Soccer League and the twenty-second season of USSF sanctioned Division III play organized by the United Soccer Leagues.

On August 6, 2015, the league announced that the season would consist of 30 games rather than 28 games played from 2013–2015. This was the first increase in the number of games since the league went from 24 games per season in 2012 to 28 games in 2013.

The league expanded from 24 to 29 teams in 2016. Six franchises were officially announced by the league: Swope Park Rangers, Orlando City B, Rio Grande Valley FC, FC Cincinnati, Bethlehem Steel FC, and San Antonio FC. The Austin Aztex were on hiatus for the 2016 season, due to stadium availability issues, but planned to return in 2017 pending construction of a new, soccer-specific stadium.

== Teams ==
Team	Location	Stadium	Capacity	Manager	Kit Sponsor	MLS Affiliate/Partnership
Arizona United SC	Peoria, Arizona	Peoria Sports Complex	12,339	(Canada) Frank Yallop	Food City	
Bethlehem Steel FC	Bethlehem, Pennsylvania	Goodman Stadium	16,000	(United States) Brendan Burke	Lehigh Valley Health Network	Philadelphia Union
Charleston Battery	Charleston, South Carolina	MUSC Health Stadium	5,100	(United States) Michael Anhaeuser	Teamphoria!	Atlanta United FC
Charlotte Independence	Charlotte, North Carolina	Ramblewood Soccer Complex	4,300	(United States) Mike Jeffries	OrthoCarolina	Colorado Rapids
Colorado Springs Switchbacks FC	Colorado Springs, Colorado	Switchbacks Stadium	3,500	(United States) Steve Trittschuh	Penrose-St. Francis Health Services	
FC Cincinnati	Cincinnati, Ohio	Nippert Stadium	40,000	(United States) John Harkes	Toyota	
FC Montreal	Montreal	Complexe sportif Claude-Robillard	3,500	(France) Philippe Eullaffroy		Montreal Impact
Harrisburg City Islanders	Harrisburg, Pennsylvania	FNB Field	6,187	(United States) Bill Becher	Capital Blue Cross	
LA Galaxy II	Carson, California	StubHub Center Track and Field Stadium	2,000	(United States) Curt Onalfo	Herbalife	LA Galaxy
Louisville City FC	Louisville, Kentucky	Louisville Slugger Field	13,131	(Republic of Ireland) James O'Connor	Humana	
New York Red Bulls II	Harrison, New Jersey	Red Bull Arena	20,000	(United States) John Wolyniec	Red Bull	New York Red Bulls
Oklahoma City Energy FC	Oklahoma City, Oklahoma	Taft Stadium	7,500	(Denmark) Jimmy Nielsen	First Fidelity Bank	FC Dallas
Orange County Blues FC	Irvine, California	Anteater Stadium	2,500	(England) Barry Venison		
Orlando City B	Melbourne, Florida	Titan Soccer Complex	3,500	(England) Anthony Pulis	Orlando Health	Orlando City SC
Pittsburgh Riverhounds	Pittsburgh, Pennsylvania	Highmark Stadium	3,500	(United States) Dave Brandt	Allegheny Health Network	Columbus Crew SC
Portland Timbers 2	Portland, Oregon	Merlo Field	4,892	(United States) Andrew Gregor	Alaska Airlines	Portland Timbers
Real Monarchs SLC	Sandy, Utah	Rio Tinto Stadium	20,213	(United States) Freddy Juarez	LifeVantage	Real Salt Lake
Richmond Kickers	Richmond, Virginia	City Stadium	22,000	(England) Leigh Cowlishaw	Woodfin Home Comfort Systems	D.C. United
Rio Grande Valley FC Toros	Edinburg, Texas	H-E-B Park	9,400	(Colombia) Wilmer Cabrera		Houston Dynamo
Rochester Rhinos	Rochester, New York	Sahlen's Stadium	13,768	(United States) Bob Lilley		New England Revolution
Saint Louis FC	Fenton, Missouri	Soccer Park	5,500	(United States) Tim Leonard (interim)	Electrical Connection, NECA/IBEW Local 1	Chicago Fire
Sacramento Republic FC	Sacramento, California	Bonney Field	11,569	(England) Paul Buckle	UC Davis Children's Hospital	San Jose Earthquakes
San Antonio FC	San Antonio, Texas	Toyota Field	8,296	(England) Darren Powell	Toyota	
Seattle Sounders FC 2	Tukwila, Washington	Starfire Sports Complex	4,500	(Saint Vincent and the Grenadines) Ezra Hendrickson	Xbox	Seattle Sounders FC
Swope Park Rangers	Kansas City, Missouri	Swope Soccer Village	3,557	(Canada) Marc Dos Santos	Ivy Funds	Sporting Kansas City
Toronto FC II	Vaughan, Ontario	Ontario Soccer Centre	3,500	(Canada) Jason Bent		Toronto FC
Tulsa Roughnecks FC	Tulsa, Oklahoma	ONEOK Field	7,833	(England) David Irving	Oculto	
Vancouver Whitecaps FC 2	Vancouver, British Columbia	Thunderbird Stadium	3,500	(South Africa) Alan Koch	Bell Canada	Vancouver Whitecaps FC
Wilmington Hammerheads FC	Wilmington, North Carolina	Legion Stadium	6,000	(England) Mark Briggs	New Hanover Regional Medical Center	New York City FC

Affiliate
Partnership

== Other venues ==
The Real Monarchs played three home games at other sites while Rio Tinto Stadium was being resurfaced: Aces Ballpark in Reno, Nevada, Clyde Field at Utah Valley University and Ute Soccer Field at The University of Utah in Salt Lake City.

Rio Grande Valley FC Toros played their first three games at the University of Texas Rio Grande Valley Soccer Complex while their stadium was being completed.

The September 7 game between New York Red Bulls II and Harrisburg City Islanders was played at Pucillo Field at Millersville University in Millersville, Pennsylvania.

== Relationships with MLS clubs ==
There are 11 USL teams owned and operated by MLS clubs and 9 USL-MLS affiliations among the 29 USL clubs.

The two relationship types are treated the same by Major League Soccer.

=== Managerial changes ===
Team	Outgoing manager	Manner of departure	Date of vacancy	Incoming manager	Date of appointment
Pittsburgh Riverhounds	(United States) Mark Steffens	Released	May 21, 2016	(United States) Dave Brandt	May 22, 2016
Saint Louis FC	(United States) Dale Schilly	Released	August 15, 2016	(United States) Tim Leonard (interim)	August 15, 2016
Orange County Blues	(Switzerland) Oliver Wyss	Promoted to Front Office	August 19, 2016	(England) Barry Venison	August 19, 2016

== Competition format ==
The season started on March 25 and ended on September 25. The top eight finishers in each conference qualify for the playoffs.

Locations of announced teams for the 2016 United Soccer League season
Eastern Conference; Western Conference

== League table ==
Eastern Conference

Pos	Team	Pld	W	D	L	GF	GA	GD	Pts	Qualification
1	New York Red Bulls II (C, X)	30	21	6	3	61	21	+40	69	Conference Playoffs
2	Louisville City FC	30	17	9	4	52	27	+25	60	Conference Playoffs
3	FC Cincinnati	30	16	8	6	41	27	+14	56	Conference Playoffs
4	Rochester Rhinos	30	13	12	5	38	25	+13	51	Conference Playoffs
5	Charlotte Independence	30	14	8	8	48	29	+19	50	Conference Playoffs
6	Charleston Battery	30	13	9	8	38	33	+5	48	Conference Playoffs
7	Richmond Kickers	30	12	9	9	33	26	+7	45	Conference Playoffs
8	Orlando City B	30	9	8	13	35	49	−14	35	Conference Playoffs
9	Wilmington Hammerheads FC	30	8	10	12	37	47	−10	34	
10	Harrisburg City Islanders	30	8	7	15	37	54	−17	31	
11	Bethlehem Steel FC	30	6	10	14	32	43	−11	28	
12	Toronto FC II	30	7	5	18	36	58	−22	26	
13	Pittsburgh Riverhounds	30	6	7	17	31	50	−19	25	
14	FC Montreal	30	7	2	21	35	57	−22	23	

Source: 2016 USL Standings
Rules for classification: 1) total wins; 2) total goal differential; 3) total goals scored; 4) points earned against top four Conference finishers; 5) disciplinary points; 6) coin toss or drawing of lots
(C) Champions; (X) Regular Season League Champion

Western Conference

Pos	Team	Pld	W	D	L	GF	GA	GD	Pts	Qualification
1	Sacramento Republic	30	14	10	6	43	27	+16	52	Conference Playoffs
2	Rio Grande Valley Toros	30	14	9	7	47	24	+23	51	Conference Playoffs
3	Colorado Springs Switchbacks	30	14	7	9	37	27	+10	49	Conference Playoffs
4	Swope Park Rangers	30	14	6	10	45	36	+9	48	Conference Playoffs
5	LA Galaxy II	30	12	11	7	52	42	+10	47	Conference Playoffs
6	Vancouver Whitecaps 2	30	12	9	9	44	44	0	45	Conference Playoffs
7	Oklahoma City Energy	30	10	13	7	32	30	+2	43	Conference Playoffs
8	Orange County Blues	30	12	4	14	39	41	−2	40	Conference Playoffs
9	Portland Timbers 2	30	12	4	14	38	42	−4	40	
10	San Antonio FC	30	10	8	12	36	36	0	38	
11	Real Monarchs	30	10	6	14	31	41	−10	36	
12	Seattle Sounders 2	30	9	8	13	35	50	−15	35	
13	Arizona United	30	9	7	14	40	46	−6	34	
14	Saint Louis FC	30	8	10	12	42	44	−2	34	
15	Tulsa Roughnecks	30	5	4	21	25	64	−39	19	

Source: 2016 USL Standings
Rules for classification: 1) total wins; 2) total goal differential; 3) total goals scored; 4) points earned against top four Conference finishers; 5) disciplinary points; 6) coin toss or drawing of lots

== Results table ==
Home • Away • Win • Loss • Draw
Club	Match																													
Club	1	2	3	4	5	6	7	8	9	10	11	12	13	14	15	16	17	18	19	20	21	22	23	24	25	26	27	28	29	30
Arizona United SC (AZU)	LAG	SEA	SAC	CSS	RMO	POR	OKC	OCB	CSS	LAG	OCB	STL	RGV	SAC	TUL	SPR	SEA	RMO	TUL	VAN	OCB	SAN	SAN	VAN	RMO	LAG	SAN	POR	RMO	POR
Arizona United SC (AZU)	0–2	2–0	0–1	0–2	1–0	1–1	0–0	1–1	1–3	1–4	2–0	2–1	1–1	1–1	2–3	1–1	2–3	3–0	1–2	3–2	3–1	1–0	2–3	1–3	0–1	1–2	1–1	1–2	3–2	2–3
Bethlehem Steel FC (BET)	MON	CIN	NYR	RIC	CHB	LOU	ORL	MON	HAR	ROC	NYR	CLT	WIL	RIC	CIN	TOR	PIT	WIL	HAR	ROC	TOR	CLT	PIT	MON	LOU	HAR	NYR	CHB	PIT	ORL
Bethlehem Steel FC (BET)	1–0	1–2	0–4	2–1	0–0	0–0	2–2	2–1	1–3	2–2	0–1	1–0	1–1	0–0	0–1	2–3	2–0	3–0	0–1	1–1	2–3	2–2	1–2	2–3	0–1	2–2	0–2	1–2	1–1	0–2
Charleston Battery (CHB)	CIN	ORL	WIL	CLT	BET	PIT	ROC	HAR	TOR	WIL	LOU	PIT	ORL	HAR	TOR	RIC	LOU	ORL	NYR	CIN	CLT	MON	WIL	CLT	RIC	ROC	MON	BET	RIC	NYR
Charleston Battery (CHB)	1–0	0–0	2–1	2–3	0–0	1–1	2–3	3–2	2–0	1–0	0–2	2–1	1–2	1–0	1–0	2–0	1–1	0–0	3–2	1–1	1–1	1–3	1–1	1–0	1–1	1–2	1–2	2–1	2–1	1–2
Charlotte Independence (CLT)	LOU	HAR	CIN	CHB	RIC	NYR	MON	WIL	ROC	ORL	TOR	BET	RIC	HAR	ORL	WIL	NYR	PIT	MON	CHB	BET	WIL	ORL	CHB	CIN	TOR	PIT	RIC	ROC	LOU
Charlotte Independence (CLT)	0–1	2–1	1–2	3–2	3–2	2–0	1–0	1–1	0–0	1–2	2–2	0–1	1–0	3–1	1–1	1–2	1–2	3–0	1–0	1–1	2–2	1–0	4–0	0–1	3–2	5–1	4–0	0–0	0–1	1–1
FC Cincinnati (CIN)	CHB	BET	CLT	LOU	TOR	WIL	ORL	HAR	PIT	HAR	RIC	MON	TOR	LOU	BET	ROC	STL	NYR	LOU	CHB	MON	RIC	ROC	NYR	CLT	STL	WIL	PIT	ORL	PIT
FC Cincinnati (CIN)	0–1	2–1	2–1	2–3	2–1	1–1	3–1	1–1	1–0	2–0	1–1	2–1	2–1	0–0	1–0	1–2	2–1	1–2	2–0	1–1	2–0	1–1	1–1	0–2	2–3	2–1	2–0	0–0	1–0	1–0
Colorado Springs Switchbacks (CSS)	OKC	AZU	SEA	SAN	LAG	OCB	POR	AZU	OCB	STL	LAG	SAN	RMO	RMO	POR	SEA	SAC	SPR	STL	VAN	POR	RMO	TUL	RGV	OKC	RGV	LAG	VAN	SEA	OCB
Colorado Springs Switchbacks (CSS)	2–1	2–0	0–1	1–0	2–3	3–0	1–0	3–1	1–1	2–0	0–0	1–2	0–1	1–0	1–1	1–2	1–0	1–1	1–2	1–1	1–1	0–0	1–0	0–2	2–0	1–2	3–0	2–0	2–1	0–4
Harrisburg City Islanders (HAR)	RIC	CLT	ORL	LOU	ORL	ROC	CIN	CHB	BET	TOR	CIN	WIL	NYR	CHB	MON	CLT	PIT	RIC	TOR	PIT	BET	ROC	NYR	LOU	TOR	PIT	BET	NYR	WIL	MON
Harrisburg City Islanders (HAR)	1–3	1–2	1–0	2–3	2–1	1–2	1–1	2–3	3–1	2–1	0–2	2–3	0–1	0–1	2–3	1–3	0–0	0–3	2–4	2–1	1–0	1–1	0–5	1–1	1–0	1–1	2–2	1–4	1–1	3–1
LA Galaxy II (LAG)	AZU	STL	RMO	OCB	SAN	VAN	RGV	CSS	SAC	VAN	SEA	AZU	SAC	CSS	TUL	TUL	OCB	POR	SAN	OCB	POR	OKC	OCB	SPR	AZU	CSS	SAC	RGV	SAC	RMO
LA Galaxy II (LAG)	2–0	3–0	3–3	1–1	1–1	2–2	2–0	3–2	0–2	3–4	1–1	4–1	2–2	0–0	2–2	2–0	2–1	4–1	3–2	0–2	3–4	0–0	0–2	1–2	2–1	0–3	1–1	1–0	1–1	3–1
Louisville City FC (LOU)	CLT	NYR	ORL	CIN	HAR	PIT	BET	TOR	STL	RIC	CHB	ORL	WIL	ROC	TOR	CIN	MON	CHB	WIL	CIN	ORL	PIT	HAR	ROC	NYR	BET	MON	RIC	STL	CLT
Louisville City FC (LOU)	1–0	0–2	4–1	3–2	3–2	2–2	0–0	2–0	2–0	0–0	2–0	4–3	2–2	1–0	4–1	0–0	2–0	1–1	4–1	0–2	1–2	2–1	1–1	1–1	0–1	1–0	1–0	2–0	5–1	1–1
FC Montreal (MON)	BET	TOR	WIL	ROC	ORL	CLT	BET	NYR	RIC	ROC	CIN	TOR	PIT	HAR	ORL	LOU	NYR	ROC	CLT	CIN	RIC	PIT	CHB	BET	TOR	WIL	LOU	CHB	NYR	HAR
FC Montreal (MON)	0–1	1–2	0–2	1–2	0–1	0–1	1–2	0–1	2–1	0–2	1–2	1–1	1–2	3–2	1–3	0–2	2–4	1–3	0–1	0–2	1–2	4–1	3–1	3–2	4–3	2–2	0–1	2–1	0–4	1–3
New York Red Bulls II (NYR)	TOR	LOU	BET	ROC	WIL	CLT	PIT	RIC	MON	PIT	BET	HAR	ORL	WIL	ROC	MON	CLT	CIN	CHB	RIC	HAR	ORL	LOU	TOR	CIN	BET	HAR	ROC	MON	CHB
New York Red Bulls II (NYR)	2–2	2–0	4–0	0–0	1–0	0–2	3–1	1–1	1–0	1–0	1–0	1–0	2–2	4–0	0–0	4–2	2–1	2–1	2–3	1–2	5–0	5–1	1–0	1–0	2–0	2–0	4–1	1–1	4–0	2–1
Oklahoma City Energy FC (OKC)	CSS	STL	SPR	SEA	AZU	SAN	SAN	RMO	TUL	RGV	SPR	VAN	RGV	SAN	SPR	OCB	TUL	STL	SAC	RGV	LAG	TUL	CSS	TUL	STL	POR	SEA	SPR	VAN	STL
Oklahoma City Energy FC (OKC)	1–2	2–2	1–0	1–1	0–0	1–1	1–0	3–1	2–0	0–3	3–1	1–1	0–0	0–0	2–0	2–1	3–0	0–0	0–1	0–0	0–0	2–0	0–2	1–0	1–1	0–4	2–2	0–3	1–2	2–2
Orange County Blues FC (OCB)	VAN	STL	LAG	SAN	POR	SAC	CSS	AZU	RMO	CSS	SEA	AZU	RMO	SAN	RGV	LAG	SAC	OKC	SPR	LAG	TUL	AZU	VAN	POR	LAG	SAC	SAC	RMO	RGV	CSS
Orange County Blues FC (OCB)	0–1	1–3	1–1	1–0	1–0	1–0	0–3	1–1	1–3	1–1	5–2	0–2	1–0	2–3	2–1	1–2	3–3	1–2	0–3	2–0	2–1	1–3	1–0	1–2	2–0	0–1	1–2	2–0	0–1	4–0
Orlando City B (ORL)	WIL	CHB	LOU	HAR	PIT	HAR	MON	CIN	BET	ROC	CLT	LOU	CHB	NYR	MON	CLT	ROC	CHB	WIL	LOU	TOR	NYR	CLT	RIC	RIC	PIT	WIL	TOR	CIN	BET
Orlando City B (ORL)	1–2	0–0	1–4	0–1	2–1	1–2	1–0	1–3	2–2	2–1	2–1	3–4	2–1	2–2	3–1	1–1	0–0	0–0	2–2	2–1	2–1	1–5	0–4	1–1	0–1	0–2	0–3	1–2	0–1	2–0
Pittsburgh Riverhounds (PIT)	ROC	TOR	ORL	LOU	CHB	NYR	CIN	TOR	NYR	CHB	RIC	MON	ROC	HAR	BET	RIC	HAR	CLT	WIL	LOU	MON	BET	ROC	WIL	HAR	ORL	CLT	CIN	BET	CIN
Pittsburgh Riverhounds (PIT)	0–1	2–2	1–2	2–2	1–1	1–3	0–1	2–1	0–1	1–2	1–3	2–1	1–2	0–0	0–2	0–2	1–2	0–3	4–1	1–2	1–4	2–1	0–3	4–1	1–1	2–0	0–4	0–0	1–1	0–1
Portland Timbers 2 (POR)	SPR	VAN	RGV	SAC	OCB	TUL	AZU	RMO	CSS	VAN	SEA	SPR	SAN	SEA	VAN	STL	CSS	LAG	SEA	CSS	LAG	OCB	RMO	SAC	SEA	OKC	RGV	AZU	VAN	AZU
Portland Timbers 2 (POR)	1–2	1–3	0–2	1–0	0–1	2–0	1–1	3–1	0–1	1–3	1–0	2–1	1–1	1–2	2–1	0–1	1–1	1–4	0–1	1–1	4–3	2–1	1–2	0–4	1–2	4–0	1–0	2–1	2–0	3–2
Real Monarchs (RMO)	STL	LAG	TUL	AZU	RGV	SEA	POR	RGV	OCB	OKC	VAN	VAN	SAC	SAC	OCB	CSS	CSS	VAN	SAC	AZU	SEA	CSS	SPR	POR	AZU	TUL	OCB	SAN	AZU	LAG
Real Monarchs (RMO)	1–0	3–3	1–0	0–1	0–1	0–0	1–3	1–1	3–1	1–3	2–2	1–0	0–1	1–2	0–1	1–0	0–1	1–2	3–2	0–3	1–4	0–0	1–0	2–1	1–0	1–1	0–2	2–0	2–3	1–3
Richmond Kickers (RIC)	HAR	WIL	ROC	BET	CLT	TOR	WIL	TOR	NYR	LOU	MON	CIN	PIT	CLT	BET	CHB	HAR	PIT	TOR	NYR	ROC	MON	CIN	ORL	ORL	CHB	LOU	CLT	CHB	WIL
Richmond Kickers (RIC)	3–1	0–0	1–0	1–2	2–3	1–0	1–0	0–1	1–1	0–0	1–2	1–1	3–1	0–1	0–0	0–2	3–0	2–0	3–0	2–1	1–0	2–1	1–1	1–1	1–0	1–1	0–2	0–0	1–2	0–2
Rio Grande Valley Toros (RGV)	TUL	POR	SEA	RMO	LAG	SAN	RMO	SPR	SAN	STL	SAN	SPR	OKC	SAN	AZU	OCB	OKC	TUL	VAN	SAC	OKC	SEA	TUL	CSS	CSS	SPR	POR	LAG	OCB	SAN
Rio Grande Valley Toros (RGV)	0–2	2–0	2–2	1–0	0–2	3–2	1–1	4–1	0–0	1–1	1–0	0–4	3–0	2–3	1–1	1–2	0–0	0–0	4–0	0–0	0–0	6–0	5–0	2–0	2–1	2–0	0–1	0–1	1–0	3–0
Rochester Rhinos (ROC)	PIT	RIC	NYR	MON	HAR	CHB	CLT	ORL	BET	MON	TOR	LOU	PIT	NYR	CIN	ORL	MON	TOR	BET	HAR	RIC	WIL	LOU	PIT	CIN	WIL	CHB	NYR	CLT	TOR
Rochester Rhinos (ROC)	1–0	0–1	0–0	2–1	2–1	3–2	0–0	1–2	2–2	2–0	1–2	0–1	2–1	0–0	2–1	0–0	3–1	1–1	1–1	1–1	0–1	2–0	1–1	3–0	1–1	2–2	2–1	1–1	1–0	1–0
Sacramento Republic FC (SAC)	SEA	AZU	VAN	POR	STL	OCB	LAG	SEA	SPR	LAG	RMO	RMO	RGV	AZU	SEA	RMO	OCB	CSS	VAN	RGV	OCB	SAN	STL	POR	OCB	VAN	OCB	LAG	LAG	TUL
Sacramento Republic FC (SAC)	1–0	1–0	0–0	0–1	0–1	0–1	2–0	2–0	1–1	2–2	1–0	2–1	3–2	1–1	2–1	2–3	3–3	0–1	1–2	0–0	1–0	1–1	4–3	4–0	1–0	0–0	2–1	1–1	1–1	4–0
Saint Louis FC (STL)	RMO	LAG	OCB	OKC	TUL	SAC	SPR	LOU	TUL	VAN	RGV	CSS	TUL	AZU	POR	SPR	SEA	CIN	TUL	CSS	OKC	SPR	SAC	SPR	SAN	OKC	CIN	SAN	LOU	OKC
Saint Louis FC (STL)	0–1	0–3	3–1	2–2	0–0	1–0	3–0	0–2	5–2	1–1	1–1	0–2	7–1	1–2	1–0	0–1	1–1	1–2	0–2	2–1	0–0	1–1	3–4	1–1	0–2	1–1	1–2	3–1	1–5	2–2
San Antonio FC (SAN)	SEA	SPR	LAG	OCB	CSS	TUL	RGV	OKC	OKC	RGV	RGV	POR	CSS	OCB	TUL	OKC	VAN	LAG	SPR	SAC	AZU	AZU	SEA	STL	SPR	AZU	STL	RMO	TUL	RGV
San Antonio FC (SAN)	3–0	1–1	1–1	0–1	0–1	3–1	2–3	1–1	0–1	0–0	0–1	1–1	2–1	3–2	2–1	0–0	2–0	2–3	1–2	1–1	0–1	3–2	1–0	2–0	1–2	1–1	1–3	0–2	2–0	0–3
Seattle Sounders 2 (SEA)	SAC	AZU	SAN	RGV	CSS	RMO	OKC	TUL	SAC	LAG	POR	OBC	VAN	POR	SPR	SAC	STL	CSS	AZU	POR	RMO	VAN	RGV	SAN	POR	VAN	VAN	OKC	CSS	SPR
Seattle Sounders 2 (SEA)	0–1	0–2	0–3	2–2	1–0	0–0	1–1	1–2	0–2	1–1	0–1	2–5	3–2	2–1	0–2	1–2	1–1	2–1	3–2	1–0	4–1	1–1	0–6	0–1	2–1	2–1	2–2	2–2	1–2	0–2
Swope Park Rangers KC (SPR)	POR	TUL	SAN	OKC	VAN	STL	TUL	RGV	SAC	POR	RGV	VAN	OKC	SEA	STL	AZU	OKC	CSS	OCB	SAN	STL	RMO	STL	LAG	SAN	RGV	TUL	OKC	TUL	SEA
Swope Park Rangers KC (SPR)	2–1	2–1	1–1	0–1	1–2	0–3	2–1	1–4	1–1	1–2	4–0	2–3	1–3	2–0	1–0	1–1	0–2	1–1	3–0	2–1	1–1	0–1	1–1	2–1	2–1	0–2	3–0	3–0	3–1	2–0
Toronto FC II (TOR)	NYR	MON	PIT	CIN	RIC	LOU	RIC	CHB	PIT	HAR	WIL	CLT	ROC	MON	CIN	LOU	CHB	WIL	BET	HAR	ROC	RIC	BET	ORL	HAR	NYR	MON	CLT	ORL	ROC
Toronto FC II (TOR)	2–2	2–1	2–2	1–2	0–1	0–2	1–0	0–2	1–2	1–2	1–3	2–2	2–1	1–1	1–2	1–4	0–1	0–3	3–2	4–2	1–1	0–3	3–2	1–2	0–1	0–1	3–4	1–5	2–1	0–1
Tulsa Roughnecks FC (TUL)	RGV	SPR	RMO	STL	POR	SAN	VAN	SEA	SPR	STL	OKC	STL	LAG	LAG	AZU	SAN	RGV	STL	OKC	AZU	OCB	CSS	RGV	OKC	OKC	RMO	SPR	SAN	SPR	SAC
Tulsa Roughnecks FC (TUL)	2–0	1–2	0–1	0–0	0–2	1–3	2–3	2–1	1–2	2–5	0–2	1–7	2–2	0–2	3–2	1–2	0–0	2–0	0–3	2–1	1–2	0–1	0–5	0–2	0–1	1–1	0–3	0–2	1–3	0–4
Vancouver Whitecaps FC 2 (VAN)	OCB	POR	SAC	LAG	SPR	TUL	LAG	POR	STL	RMO	RMO	SEA	SPR	POR	OKC	RMO	RGV	SAN	SAC	CSS	AZU	SEA	OCB	AZU	SAC	SEA	SEA	CSS	POR	OKC
Vancouver Whitecaps FC 2 (VAN)	1–0	3–1	0–0	2–2	2–1	3–2	4–3	3–1	1–1	2–2	0–1	2–3	3–2	1–2	1–1	2–1	0–4	0–2	2–1	1–1	2–3	1–1	0–1	3–1	0–0	1–2	2–2	0–2	0–2	2–1
Wilmington Hammerheads (WIL)	ORL	RIC	CHB	MON	NYR	CIN	RIC	CLT	CHB	TOR	HAR	LOU	BET	NYR	TOR	CLT	BET	LOU	ORL	PIT	ROC	CLT	CHB	PIT	ROC	MON	ORL	CIN	HAR	RIC
Wilmington Hammerheads (WIL)	2–1	0–0	1–2	2–0	0–1	1–1	0–1	1–1	0–1	3–1	3–2	2–2	1–1	0–4	3–0	2–1	0–3	1–4	2–2	1–4	0–2	0–1	1–1	1–4	2–2	2–2	3–0	0–2	1–1	2–0

== Playoffs ==
The team with the best record across both conferences earned the 2016 USL Regular Season title. The top eight teams in each conference advanced to the 2016 USL Playoffs, which were a single-elimination bracket crown two conference champions. The two conference champions advanced to the 2016 USL Championship.

The playoffs took place over the course of four weeks. The fixed seed format concluded with the USL Championship, which was held at the venue of the conference champion with the best regular season record.

First round
October 2 – Red Bull Arena
#1 New York Red Bulls II	4
#8 Orlando City B	0
October 1 – Rochester Rhinos Stadium
#4 Rochester Rhinos	3
#5 Charlotte Independence	1
October 2 – Nippert Stadium
#3 FC Cincinnati	1
#6 Charleston Battery	2
October 2 – Louisville Slugger Field
#2 Louisville City FC (a.e.t.)	2
#7 Richmond Kickers	0
October 1 – Bonney Field
#1 Sacramento Republic FC	0 (4)
#8 Orange County Blues FC (p)	0 (5)
September 30 – Swope Soccer Village
#4 Swope Park Rangers	3
#5 LA Galaxy II	0
September 30 – Switchbacks Stadium
#3 Colorado Springs Switchbacks FC	1
#6 Vancouver Whitecaps FC 2	2
October 1 – H-E-B Park
#2 Rio Grande Valley FC Toros	2
#7 Oklahoma City Energy FC	3

Conference Semifinals
October 7 – Red Bull Arena
#1 New York Red Bulls II (p)	3 (5)
#4 Rochester Rhinos	3 (4)
October 8 – Louisville Slugger Field
#6 Charleston Battery	0
#2 Louisville City FC	1
October 9 – Swope Soccer Village
#8 Orange County Blues FC	1
#4 Swope Park Rangers (a.e.t.)	2
October 8 – Thunderbird Stadium
#6 Vancouver Whitecaps FC 2	3
#7 Oklahoma City Energy FC	2

Conference finals
October 16 - Red Bull Arena
#1 New York Red Bulls II (p)	1 (4)
#2 Louisville City FC	1 (3)
October 15 - Swope Soccer Village
#4 Swope Park Rangers	3
#6 Vancouver Whitecaps FC 2	0

USL Championship
October 23 - Red Bull Arena
#1 New York Red Bulls II	5
#4 Swope Park Rangers	1

=== Eastern Conference ===
October 1, 2016 QF	Rochester Rhinos	3–1	Charlotte Independence	Rochester, New York
6:05 pm EDT	Fall 7'; Dos Santos 24'; Tergou 70' (yellow card) 87'; Totsch (yellow card) 90+1'	Report; Report	Duckett (yellow card) 5'; Hassan 75'; Davidson (yellow card) 79' (yellow-red card) 82'; Metcalf (red card) 80'; Martínez (yellow card) 90+1' (yellow-red card) 90+6'	Stadium: Rochester Rhinos Stadium; Attendance: 2,080; Referee: Henrik Karlsson

October 2, 2016 QF	New York Red Bulls II	4–0	Orlando City B	Harrison, New Jersey
4:00 pm EDT	Long 32', 77'; Bezecourt 60'; Allen 63'	Report; Report	Ribeiro (yellow card) 30'; Neal (yellow card) 45+1'; Heath (red card) 63'	Stadium: Red Bull Arena; Attendance: 1,088; Referee: Matthew Kreitzer

October 2, 2016 QF	FC Cincinnati	1–2	Charleston Battery	Cincinnati, Ohio
4:00 pm EDT	Stevenson 19'	Report; Report	Tsonis 40'; Chang (yellow card) 62'; Prince 65'	Stadium: Nippert Stadium; Attendance: 30,187 (USL Record); Referee: Kevin Terry Jr.

October 2, 2016 QF	Louisville City FC	2–0 (a.e.t.)	Richmond Kickers	Louisville, Kentucky
7:00 pm EDT	Davis 92'; Hoffman 102'	Report; Report	Asante (red card) 5'; Lee (yellow card) 18'; Yeisley (yellow card) 34'; William (yellow card) 40'; Troyer (yellow card) 42'	Stadium: Louisville Slugger Field; Attendance: 5,467; Referee: Andrew Musashe

October 7, 2016 SF	New York Red Bulls II	3–3 (a.e.t.) (5–4 p)	Rochester Rhinos	Harrison, New Jersey
7:00 pm EDT	Etienne 20'; Allen 44', 119' (pen.); Adams (yellow card) 57'; Metzger (yellow card) 63'; Carroll (yellow card) 82'	Report; Report	Farrell (yellow card) 20'; Dos Santos 22', 55'; Tergou (yellow card) 40'; Fall 110'	Stadium: Red Bull Arena; Attendance: 1,229; Referee: Luis Guardia
	Penalties
	Long (penalty scored); Etienne (penalty scored); Allen (penalty scored); Metzger (penalty scored); Plewa (penalty scored)		(penalty scored) Fall; (penalty scored) Farrell; (penalty scored) Apostolopoulos; (penalty missed) Dos Santos; (penalty scored) Kyriazis

October 8, 2016 SF	Louisville City FC	1–0	Charleston Battery	Louisville, Kentucky
7:30 pm EDT	Smith (yellow card) 45+1'; Dacres 53'; Reynolds (yellow card) 90+4'	Report; Report	Tsonis (yellow card) 24'; Marini (yellow card) 62'; Adjetey (yellow card) 67'; Woodbine (red card) 90+4'	Stadium: Louisville Slugger Field; Attendance: 6,581; Referee: Mark Kadlecik

October 16, 2016 F	New York Red Bulls II	1–1 (a.e.t.) (4–3 p)	Louisville City FC	Harrison, New Jersey
6:00 pm EDT	Valot 74'; Williams (red card) 118'	Report; Report	Craig 11' (yellow card) 102' (yellow-red card) 120+'; Reynolds (red card) 104'	Stadium: Red Bull Arena; Attendance: 2,709; Referee: Robert Sibiga
	Penalties
	Etienne (penalty scored); Long (penalty scored); Allen (penalty scored); Bezecourt (penalty scored)		(penalty missed) Lancaster; (penalty scored) Smith; (penalty scored) Quinn; (penalty scored) Kaye; (penalty missed) Newnam

=== Western Conference ===
September 30, 2016 QF	Swope Park Rangers	3–0	LA Galaxy II	Kansas City, Missouri
7:30 pm CDT	Tyrpak 76'; Gonzalez 90+3', 90+5'	Report; Report	Amaya (yellow card) 9'; Villarreal (yellow card) 34' (yellow-red card) 65'; Covarrubias (yellow card) 59'; Payeras (yellow card) 79'	Stadium: Swope Soccer Village; Attendance: 1,885; Referee: Guido Gonzales Jr.

September 30, 2016 QF	Colorado Springs Switchbacks FC	1–2	Vancouver Whitecaps FC 2	Colorado Springs, Colorado
7:00 pm MDT	Vercollone 7'; Ibeagha (yellow card) 44'	Report; Report	Greig 17'; Froese 31'	Stadium: Switchbacks Stadium; Attendance: 2,405; Referee: Ramy Touchan

October 1, 2016 QF	Rio Grande Valley FC Toros	2–3	Oklahoma City Energy	Edinburg, Texas
7:30 pm CDT	Luna 33'; Ward (yellow card) 53'; Bird 76'; Greene (yellow card) 83'	Report; Report	Ryden (yellow card) 72'; Olsson 73'; Bonner 90+2', 90+3'	Stadium: H-E-B Park; Attendance: 2,701; Referee: Rosendo Mendoza

October 1, 2016 QF	Sacramento Republic FC	0–0 (a.e.t.) (4–5 p)	Orange County Blues FC	Sacramento, California
7:30 pm PDT		Report; Report	Sheldon (yellow card) 68'; Mirković (yellow card) 109'; Griffiths (yellow card) 120'	Stadium: Bonney Field; Attendance: 10,926; Referee: Timothy Ford
	Penalties
	Trickett-Smith (penalty scored); Iwasa (penalty scored); Koval (penalty missed); Guzmán (penalty scored); Cole (penalty scored)		(penalty scored) Meeus; (penalty scored) Chaplow; (penalty scored) Stevanovic; (penalty scored) Barouch; (penalty scored) Crettenand

October 8, 2016 SF	Vancouver Whitecaps FC 2	3–2	Oklahoma City Energy	Vancouver, British Columbia
12:00 pm PDT	Seymore (yellow card) 20'; Froese 27'; Greig 48'; Haber 89'	Report; Report	Thomas (yellow card) 23'; König 60' (yellow card) 90'; Andrews (yellow card) 61'; Pitter 80'	Stadium: Thunderbird Stadium; Attendance: 1,308

October 9, 2016 SF	Swope Park Rangers	2–1 (a.e.t.)	Orange County Blues FC	Kansas City, Missouri
3:00 pm CDT	Gonzalez 20'; Duke (yellow card) 40'; Alvarado (red card) 69'; Meyer (red card) 88'; Kelly 105'	Report	Rauhofer 70'	Stadium: Swope Soccer Village; Attendance: 2,181; Referee: Nima Saghafi

October 15, 2016 F	Swope Park Rangers	3–0	Vancouver Whitecaps FC 2	Kansas City, Missouri
7:30 pm CDT	Tyrpak 8', 32'; Selbol (yellow card) 83' (yellow-red card) 90+2'; Molano (yellow card) 88'; Kelly 89'	Report; Report	de Wit (yellow card) 90'	Stadium: Swope Soccer Village; Attendance: 2,922; Referee: Juan Guzman

=== USL Championship ===
October 23, 2016	New York Red Bulls II	5–1	Swope Park Rangers	Harrison, New Jersey
8:00 pm EDT	Etienne 18'; Allen 39', 85', 88'; Metzger (yellow card) 72'; Bezecourt 90+2'	Report; Report; Report	Granitto 74'	Stadium: Red Bull Arena; Attendance: 5,547; Referee: Armando Villarreal

Championship Game MVP: (United States) Brandon Allen (NYRB)

== Attendance ==
The following table shows average home attendances, ranked from highest to lowest.

Team	GP	Total	High	Low	Average
FC Cincinnati	15	259,437	24,376	11,278	17,296
Sacramento Republic FC	15	172,711	11,569	10,745	11,514
Louisville City FC	15	108,269	10,062	5,298	7,218
San Antonio FC	15	92,546	8,466	4,326	6,170
Oklahoma City Energy FC	15	74,249	6,455	3,753	4,950
Saint Louis FC	15	73,841	6,004	4,209	4,923
Richmond Kickers	15	59,941	6,123	2,647	3,996
Tulsa Roughnecks FC	15	59,247	5,328	3,323	3,950
Rochester Rhinos	15	54,819	5,124	2,442	3,655
Charleston Battery	15	53,563	5,481	3,150	3,570
Colorado Springs Switchbacks FC	15	47,284	4,308	2,212	3,152
Wilmington Hammerheads	15	44,996	3,837	1,809	3,000
Bethlehem Steel FC	15	38,596	3,664	422	2,573
Real Monarchs	15	37,919	5,182	376	2,528
Pittsburgh Riverhounds	15	37,412	3,440	1,711	2,494
Portland Timbers 2	15	34,849	4,352	1,528	2,323
Rio Grande Valley FC	15	29,903	2,646	1,448	1,994
Vancouver Whitecaps FC 2	15	26,683	3,057	857	1,779
Swope Park Rangers	15	26,301	6,812	926	1,753
Harrisburg City Islanders	16^{†}	24,758	2,853	227	1,547
Arizona United SC	15	22,045	3,374	753	1,470
Seattle Sounders FC 2	15	21,017	1,835	1,182	1,401
Charlotte Independence	15	20,620	1,801	1,018	1,375
LA Galaxy II	15	18,159	2,715	503	1,211
Toronto FC II	15	15,396	1,300	576	1,026
Orange County Blues FC	15	15,156	2,455	463	1,010
Orlando City B	15	14,363	2,078	642	958
New York Red Bulls II	14^{†}	8,250	2,096	214	589
FC Montreal	15	3,647	966	58	243
Total	435	1,496,493	24,376	58	3,439

^{†} One New York Red Bulls II home game was moved to Millersville, Pennsylvania because of a scheduling conflict.

- Sources: kenn.com and USL

== Statistical leaders ==
=== Top scorers ===
Rank	Player	Nation	Club	Goals
1	Sean Okoli	USA	FC Cincinnati	16
2	Brandon Allen	USA	New York Red Bulls II	15
2	Jack McBean	USA	LA Galaxy II	15
4	Irvin Herrera	SLV	Saint Louis FC	14
4	Chandler Hoffman	USA	Louisville City FC	14
6	Corey Hertzog	USA	Pittsburgh Riverhounds	13
7	Cameron Iwasa	USA	Sacramento Republic FC	12
8	Michael Cox	CAN	Orlando City B	11
8	Kyle Greig	USA	Vancouver Whitecaps 2	11
8	Sammy Ochoa	USA	Tulsa Roughnecks FC	11

=== Top assists ===
Rank	Player	Nation	Club	Assists
1	Villyan Bijev	BUL	Portland Timbers 2	10
2	Danny Barrera	USA	Sacramento Republic FC	9
3	Carlos Alvarez	USA	San Antonio FC	7
3	Ayrton	BRA	Swope Park Rangers	7
3	José Barril	ESP	Harrisburg City Islanders	7
3	Memo Rodriguez	USA	Rio Grande Valley FC Toros	7
7	Maikel Chang	CUB	Charleston Battery	6
7	Derrick Etienne	HAI	New York Red Bulls II	6
7	Sammy Ochoa	USA	Tulsa Roughnecks FC	6
7	Kyle Smith	USA	Louisville City FC	6
7	Long Tan	CHN	Arizona United SC	6
7	Florian Valot	FRA	New York Red Bulls II	6
7	Paul Wilson	JAM	Harrisburg City Islanders	6
7	Ricardo Velazco	USA	Real Monarchs	6

=== Top Goalkeepers ===
(Minimum of 50% of Team Minutes Played)

Rank	Goalkeeper	Club	GP	MINS	SVS	GA	GAA	W-L-T	SHO
1	(United States) Tomas Gomez	Rochester Rhinos	16	1440	39	11	0.688	9–2–5	7
2	(United States) Ryan Meara	New York Red Bulls II	21	1812	54	16	0.796	13–2–6	11
3	(United States) Dominik Jakubek	Sacramento Republic FC	18	1620	31	15	0.833	10–4–4	7
3	(Trinidad and Tobago) Greg Ranjitsingh	Louisville City FC	24	2054	50	19	0.833	12–3–9	10
5	(United States) Devala Gorrick	Colorado Springs Switchbacks	28	2451	82	23	0.846	14–7–7	13
6	(United States) Mitch Hildebrandt	FC Cincinnati	30	2608	72	25	0.862	16–6–8	10
7	(United States) Josh Ford	San Antonio FC	17	1509	53	15	0.893	5–5–7	3
8	(Puerto Rico) Cody Laurendi	Oklahoma City Energy	26	2340	80	24	0.923	9–6–11	12
9	(United States) John Berner	Charlotte Independence	20	1782	51	19	0.960	8–6–6	7
10	(Greece) Alexander Tambakis	Charleston Battery	19	1709	70	20	1.053	10–4–5	6

== League awards ==
=== Individual awards ===
- Most Valuable Player: (United States) Sean Okoli (CIN)
- Rookie of the Year: (United States) Brandon Allen (NYRB)
- Defender of the Year: (United States) Aaron Long (NYRB)
- Goalkeeper of the Year: (United States) Mitch Hildebrandt (CIN)
- Coach of the Year: (United States) John Wolyniec (NYRB)

=== All-League Teams ===
First Team

F: (United States) Brandon Allen (NYRB), (United States) Jack McBean (LAG), Sean Okoli (CIN)
M: (United States) Danny Barrera (SAC), (Bulgaria) Villyan Bijev (POR), (Uruguay) Enzo Martínez (CHA)
D: (Australia) Harrison Delbridge (CIN), (Canada) Amer Didic (SPR), (United States) Aaron Long (NYRB), (United States) Hugh Roberts (RIC)
G: (United States) Mitch Hildebrandt (CIN)

Second Team

F: (El Salvador) Irvin Herrera (STL), (United States) Corey Hertzog (PIT), (United States) Cameron Iwasa (SAC)
M: (Spain) Jose Barril (HAR), (Jamaica) Kenardo Forbes (ROC), (Japan) Yudai Imura (RIC)
D: (United States) Zach Carroll (NYRB), (United States) Joe Farrell (ROC), (Brazil) Bruno Perone (WIL), (United States) Josh Suggs (COL)
G: (United States) Devala Gorrick (COL)

Week	USL Player of the Week			
Week	Player	Club	Position	Reason
1	(United States) Scott Goodwin	Louisville City FC	Goalkeeper	SO, saved PK attempt
2	(United States) Vince Cicciarelli	Saint Louis FC	Midfielder	2G
3	(United States) Taylor Mueller	Charleston Battery	Defender	GWG
4	(United States) Chandler Hoffman	Louisville City FC	Forward	Hat Trick vs. FC Cincinnati
5	(United States) Tyler Turner	Orlando City B	Defender	2G
6	(Canada) Ben McKendry	Vancouver Whitecaps 2	Midfielder	GWG
7	(United States) Sammy Ochoa	Tulsa Roughnecks FC	Forward	4G in 2 games
8	(United States) Tommy Thompson	Sacramento Republic	Midfielder	2G
9	(El Salvador) Irvin Herrera	Saint Louis FC	Forward	4G vs. Tulsa
10	(United States) Ricardo Velazco	Real Monarchs	Midfielder	2G
11	(United States) Kyle Parker	Wilmington Hammerheads	Midfielder	2G GWG
12	(Cape Verde) Kévin Oliveira	Swope Park Rangers	Midfielder	1G 3A
13	(United States) Cameron Iwasa	Sacramento Republic	Forward	2G
14	(Mexico) Lalo Fernández	Real Monarchs	Goalkeeper	SO 8SV
15	(United States) Sammy Ochoa	Tulsa Roughnecks FC	Forward	1G 2A
16	(United States) Brandon Allen	New York Red Bulls II	Forward	Hat Trick vs. FC Montreal
17	(United States) Memo Rodriguez	Rio Grande Valley FC Toros	Forward	2G
18	(Cuba) Maikel Chang	Charleston Battery	Midfielder	1G 1A
19	(United States) Cristian Mata	Tulsa Roughnecks FC	Forward	2G
20	(United States) Chris Cortez	Arizona United SC	Forward	2 GWG
21	(Canada) Ballou Jean-Yves Tabla	FC Montreal	Forward	2G 3A
22	(United States) Thomas Sanner	Vancouver Whitecaps 2	Forward	Hat Trick vs. Arizona United
23	(United States) Matt Cardone	San Antonio FC	Goalkeeper	7SV SO vs. Saint Louis FC
24	(Uruguay) Enzo Martinez	Charlotte Independence	Midfielder	2G
25	(El Salvador) Irvin Herrera	Saint Louis FC	Forward	Hat Trick vs San Antonio FC
26	(Bulgaria) Villyan Bijev	Portland Timbers 2	Forward	1G 2A
27	(Trinidad and Tobago) Trevin Caesar	Orange County Blues	Forward	2G
