= Matt Whatley =

Matt Whatley may refer to:

- Matt Whatley (footballer)
- Matt Whatley (baseball)
