= 2017 Copa Centroamericana =

Central American Cup 2017

Tournament details
- Host country: Panama
- Dates: 13–22 January 2017
- Teams: 6 (from 1 sub-confederation)
- Venue: 1 (in 1 host city)

Final positions
- Champions: Honduras (4th title)
- Runners-up: Panama
- Third place: El Salvador
- Fourth place: Costa Rica

Tournament statistics
- Matches played: 15
- Goals scored: 27 (1.8 per match)
- Top scorer: (Honduras) Eddie Hernández (3 goals)
- Best player: (Honduras) Jorge Claros
- Best young player: (El Salvador) Roberto Domínguez
- Best goalkeeper: (Panama) José Calderón
- Fair play award: Costa Rica

The 2017 Copa Centroamericana (English: 2017 Central American Cup) was the 14th and last edition of the Copa Centroamericana, the biennial international men's football championship of the Central American region organized by the Central American Football Union (UNCAF). The tournament was hosted in Panama between 13–22 January 2017.

The top four teams qualified for the 2017 CONCACAF Gold Cup, while the fifth-placed team advanced to a play-off against the fifth-placed team from the 2017 Caribbean Cup for the final Gold Cup berth.

The tournament was played in round-robin format as a result of Guatemala not being able to participate due to FIFA's suspension of the National Football Federation of Guatemala.

== Entrants ==
Six of the seven UNCAF members were eligible to participate in the tournament.

Team	UNCAF Nations Cup / Copa Centroamericana appearances	Previous best performance	FIFA ranking at start of event
Belize	11th	4th place (2013)	163
Costa Rica	14th	Champions (1991, 1997, 1999, 2003, 2005, 2007, 2013, 2014)	17
El Salvador	14th	3rd place (1995, 1997, 2001, 2003, 2013)	138
Honduras	14th	Champions (1993, 1995, 2011)	75
Nicaragua	14th	5th place (2009)	111
Panama (Hosts)	13th	Champions (2009)	58

On 28 October 2016, FIFA suspended the National Football Federation of Guatemala for political interference by the Government of Guatemala. Until the suspension is lifted, Guatemalan teams are not permitted to participate in international competitions. CONCACAF had set the deadline of 9 December 2016 for the suspension to be lifted, otherwise by rule, Guatemala would be disqualified from the 2017 Copa Centroamericana, and any revision to the tournament format would be discussed once the deadline had passed. The suspension was not lifted before the deadline, so Guatemala could not participate in the competition.

== Venue ==
All matches were played at Estadio Rommel Fernández in Panama City.

2017 Copa Centroamericana is located in Panama	Panama City
2017 Copa Centroamericana is located in Panama	Estadio Rommel Fernández
2017 Copa Centroamericana is located in Panama	Capacity: 32,000

== Original draw ==
The original format of the competition was to be a group stage (one group of four teams and one group of three teams) followed by a knockout stage (fifth-placed match, semi-finals, third-placed match and final). The draw for the competition with the original format took place on 25 October 2016, 18:00 UTC−5, at the Hotel Sortis in Panama City, Panama.

Pot	Team
Hosts (A1)	Panama
Title holders (B1)	Costa Rica
Pot 1 (A3 or A4)
Pot 1 (A3 or A4)	Belize
Pot 1 (A3 or A4)	Nicaragua
Pot 2 (A2, B2 or B3)	El Salvador
Pot 2 (A2, B2 or B3)	Guatemala
Pot 2 (A2, B2 or B3)	Honduras

The original draw results were:

Group A

- Panama
- Honduras
- Nicaragua
- Belize

Group B

- Costa Rica
- Guatemala
- El Salvador

A change in format was announced on 10 December 2016 following FIFA's decision not to lift the suspension of the National Football Federation of Guatemala.

== Squads ==
Each team squad had to have a minimum of 18 players and a maximum of 23 players, two of whom must be goalkeepers.

== Standings ==
Pos	Team	Pld	W	D	L	GF	GA	GD	Pts	Qualification
1	Honduras (C)	5	4	1	0	7	3	+4	13	Qualification to 2017 CONCACAF Gold Cup
2	Panama (H)	5	3	1	1	4	2	+2	10	Qualification to 2017 CONCACAF Gold Cup
3	El Salvador	5	2	1	2	5	4	+1	7	Qualification to 2017 CONCACAF Gold Cup
4	Costa Rica	5	1	3	1	4	2	+2	6	Qualification to 2017 CONCACAF Gold Cup
5	Nicaragua	5	1	1	3	5	6	−1	4	Advance to 2017 CONCACAF Gold Cup CFU–UNCAF play-off
6	Belize	5	0	1	4	2	10	−8	1	

Source: CONCACAF
Rules for classification: 1) Points; 2) Goal difference; 3) Goals scored; 4) Points in matches between tied teams; 5) Goal difference in matches between tied teams; 6) Goals scored in matches between tied teams; 7) Drawing of lots (Regulations Article 8.4).
(C) Champions; (H) Hosts

== Matches ==
All times are EST (UTC−5).

=== Matchday 1 ===
13 January 2017
16:00

Honduras	2–1	Nicaragua
Hernández 23'; Andino 69'	Report	Figueroa 20' (o.g.)

Estadio Rommel Fernández, Panama City
Referee: Ricardo Montero (Costa Rica)

13 January 2017
18:30

Costa Rica	0–0	El Salvador
	Report

Estadio Rommel Fernández, Panama City
Referee: Jair Marrufo (United States)

13 January 2017
21:00

Panama	0–0	Belize
	Report

Estadio Rommel Fernández, Panama City
Referee: Walter López (Guatemala)

=== Matchday 2 ===
15 January 2017
13:00

Belize	0–3	Costa Rica
	Report	Ortiz 25', 65'; Venegas 51'

Estadio Rommel Fernández, Panama City
Referee: Kimbell Ward (Saint Kitts and Nevis)

15 January 2017
15:30

El Salvador	1–2	Honduras
Zelaya 10'	Report	Castillo 62', 90+1'

Estadio Rommel Fernández, Panama City
Referee: Fernando Guerrero (Mexico)

15 January 2017
18:00

Panama	2–1	Nicaragua
Miller 8'; Núñez 12'	Report	García 30'

Estadio Rommel Fernández, Panama City
Referee: Joel Aguilar (El Salvador)

=== Matchday 3 ===
17 January 2017
16:00

El Salvador	3–1	Belize
Mayén 15'; Barahona 20'; Romero 23'	Report	McCaulay 43'

Estadio Rommel Fernández, Panama City
Referee: Óscar Moncada (Honduras)

17 January 2017
18:30

Costa Rica	0–0	Nicaragua
	Report

Estadio Rommel Fernández, Panama City
Referee: John Pitti (Panama)

17 January 2017
21:00

Panama	0–1	Honduras
	Report	Hernández 36' (pen.)

Estadio Rommel Fernández, Panama City
Referee: Jair Marrufo (United States)

=== Matchday 4 ===
20 January 2017
16:00

Nicaragua	3–1	Belize
Barrera 30'; Cadena 84'; García 90'	Report	Smith 54' (pen.)

Estadio Rommel Fernández, Panama City
Referee: Joel Aguilar (El Salvador)

20 January 2017
18:30

Honduras	1–1	Costa Rica
Andino 17'	Report	Calvo 59'

Estadio Rommel Fernández, Panama City
Referee: Fernando Guerrero (Mexico)

20 January 2017
21:00

Panama	1–0	El Salvador
Arroyo 82'	Report

Estadio Rommel Fernández, Panama City
Referee: Walter López (Guatemala)

=== Matchday 5 ===
22 January 2017
11:00

Belize	0–1	Honduras
	Report	Hernández 56'

Estadio Rommel Fernández, Panama City
Referee: Kimbell Ward (Saint Kitts and Nevis)

22 January 2017
13:30

El Salvador	1–0	Nicaragua
Herrera 54'	Report

Estadio Rommel Fernández, Panama City
Referee: John Pitti (Panama)

22 January 2017
16:00

Panama	1–0	Costa Rica
Cooper 67'	Report

Estadio Rommel Fernández, Panama City
Referee: Óscar Moncada (Honduras)

== Goalscorers ==
3 goals

- (Honduras) Eddie Hernández

2 goals

- (Costa Rica) José Guillermo Ortiz
- (Honduras) Erick Andino
- (Honduras) Rubilio Castillo
- (Nicaragua) Bryan García

1 goal

- (Belize) Deon McCaulay
- (Belize) Elroy Smith
- (Costa Rica) Francisco Calvo
- (Costa Rica) Johan Venegas
- (El Salvador) Juan Barahona
- (El Salvador) Irvin Herrera
- (El Salvador) Gerson Mayén
- (El Salvador) Henry Romero
- (El Salvador) Rodolfo Zelaya
- (Nicaragua) Juan Barrera
- (Nicaragua) Daniel Cadena
- (Panama) Abdiel Arroyo
- (Panama) Armando Cooper
- (Panama) Roderick Miller
- (Panama) Josiel Núñez

Own goals

- (Honduras) Henry Figueroa (playing against Nicaragua)

== Awards ==
The following awards were given at the conclusion of the tournament:

- Golden Ball: (Honduras) Jorge Claros
- Golden Boot: (Honduras) Eddie Hernández (3 goals)
- Golden Glove: (Panama) José Calderón
- Young player award: (El Salvador) Roberto Domínguez
- Fair play award: (Costa Rica) Jhonny Acosta
- Best XI:
  - Goalkeeper: (Panama) José Calderón
  - Left Defender: (El Salvador) Alexander Larín
  - Central Defender: (Panama) Harold Cummings
  - Central Defender: (Costa Rica) Francisco Calvo
  - Right Defender: (Honduras) Jairo Puerto
  - Left Midfielder: (El Salvador) Óscar Cerén
  - Central Midfielder: (El Salvador) Darwin Cerén
  - Central Midfielder: (Honduras) Jorge Claros
  - Central Midfielder: (Panama) Armando Cooper
  - Left Midfielder: (Honduras) Erick Andino
  - Forward: (Honduras) Eddie Hernández

== Qualified teams for 2017 CONCACAF Gold Cup ==
The following five teams qualified for the 2017 CONCACAF Gold Cup.

Team	Qualified on	Previous Gold Cup qualifications
Honduras	17 January 2017	12 (1991, 1993, 1996, 1998, 2000, 2003, 2005, 2007, 2009, 2011, 2013, 2015)
Panama	20 January 2017	7 (1993, 2005, 2007, 2009, 2011, 2013, 2015)
El Salvador	22 January 2017	9 (1996, 1998, 2002, 2003, 2007, 2009, 2011, 2013, 2015)
Costa Rica	20 January 2017	12 (1991, 1993, 1998, 2000, 2002, 2003, 2005, 2007, 2009, 2011, 2013, 2015)
Nicaragua (won play-off over Haiti)	28 March 2017	1 (2009)
