= 2017 CONCACAF Gold Cup qualification (CFU–UNCAF play-off) =

- Event: 2017 CONCACAF Gold Cup qualification
Haiti	Nicaragua
3	4
- on aggregate

First leg
Haiti	Nicaragua
3	1
- Date: 24 March 2017
- Venue: Stade Sylvio Cator, Port-au-Prince
- Referee: Drew Fischer (Canada)

Second leg
Nicaragua	Haiti
3	0
- Date: 28 March 2017
- Venue: Estadio Nacional de Fútbol, Managua
- Referee: Jorge Rojas (Mexico)

The 2017 CONCACAF Gold Cup qualification (CFU–UNCAF play-off) was a home-and-away two-legged qualification play-off that took place in March 2017 to determine the final team that would participate in the 2017 CONCACAF Gold Cup. It was the second edition of the competition.

The Caribbean Football Union (CFU) representative, Haiti, met the Central American Football Union (UNCAF) representative, Nicaragua, in the play-off.

The matches took place on 24 and 28 March 2017, as it was the only international window on the FIFA International Match Calendar that occurred after the 2017 Copa Centroamericana and 2016 Caribbean Cup fifth place playoff had finished but before the 2017 CONCACAF Gold Cup was scheduled to begin. CONCACAF conducted a draw to determine the order of matches, at the CONCACAF Headquarters in Miami Beach, Florida, on 3 February 2017, 12:00 EST (UTC−5).

Nicaragua overcame a 3–1 first leg deficit to defeat Haiti 3–0 in the second leg and win the play-off 4–3 on aggregate, qualifying for their second appearance in the Gold Cup and their first since 2009.

== Qualified teams ==
Zone	Placement	Team
CFU	2017 Caribbean Cup fifth place	Haiti
UNCAF	2017 Copa Centroamericana fifth place	Nicaragua

== Matches ==
If tied on aggregate, away goals were the first tie-breaker.

=== First leg ===
24 March 2017
19:00 UTC−4

Haiti	3–1	Nicaragua
Louis 18', 55'; Guerrier 40'	Report	Chavarría 86'

Stade Sylvio Cator, Port-au-Prince
Referee: Drew Fischer (Canada)

=== Second leg ===
28 March 2017
19:00 UTC−6

Nicaragua	3–0	Haiti
Barrera 82' (pen.), 86', 88'	Report

Estadio Nacional de Fútbol, Managua
Referee: Jorge Rojas (Mexico)

Nicaragua won 4–3 on aggregate and qualified for the 2017 CONCACAF Gold Cup.
