= Juan Barrera =

Nicaraguan footballer (born 1989)

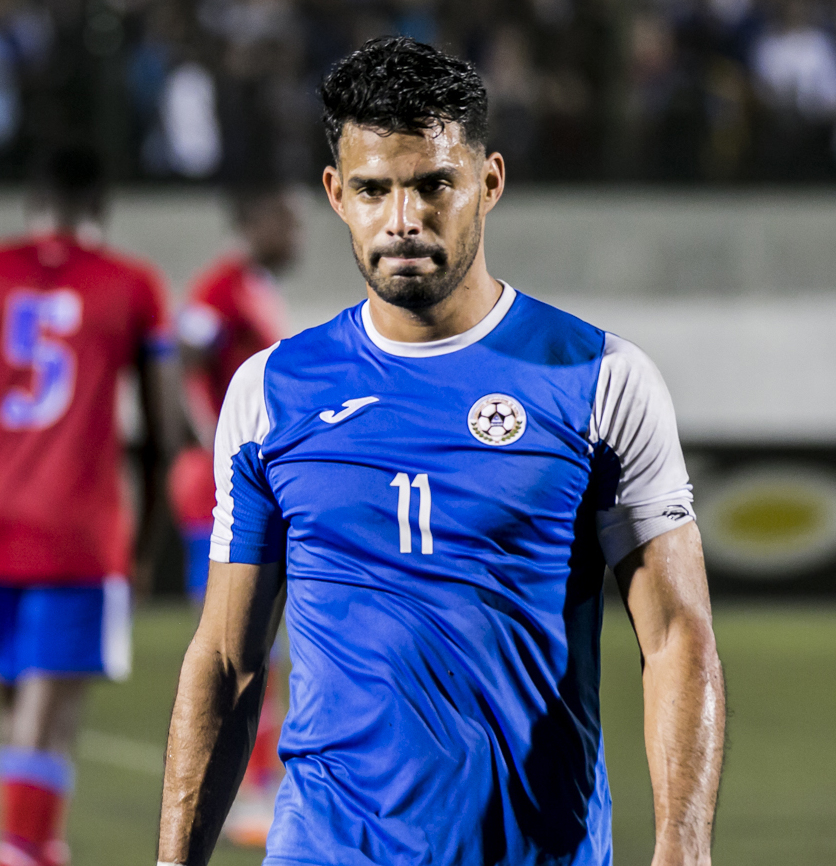
- Barrera with Nicaragua in 2017

Personal information
- Full name: Juan Ramón Barrera Pérez
- Date of birth: 2 May 1989 (age 37)
- Place of birth: Ocotal, Nicaragua
- Height: 1.75 m (5 ft 9 in)
- Positions: Winger; attacking midfielder

Team information
- Current team: Esteli
- Number: 11

Senior career*
| Years | Team | Apps | (Gls) |
| 2005–2006 | Real Estelí | | |
| 2006–2007 | Villa Austria | | |
| 2008–2011 | Walter Ferretti | | (22) |
| 2011 | Tauro | 8 | (1) |
| 2012 | Real Estelí | 4 | (1) |
| 2013 | → Deportivo Petare (loan) | 10 | (1) |
| 2013–2015 | Real Estelí | 72 | (25) |
| 2015–2016 | Rheindorf Altach | 2 | (0) |
| 2015–2016 | Rheindorf Altach II | 4 | (0) |
| 2016–2018 | Comunicaciones | 76 | (9) |
| 2018 | Metropolitanos | 9 | (1) |
| 2018 | Boyacá Chicó | 8 | (0) |
| 2019 | Municipal | 15 | (1) |
| 2019–2021 | Real Estelí | 52 | (26) |
| 2021–2022 | Xelajú | 28 | (5) |
| 2022 | Guastatoya | 19 | (1) |
| 2023–2024 | Real Estelí | 5 | (0) |
| 2024–2026 | Managua | 7 | (4) |

International career^{‡}
| 2009– | Nicaragua | 107 | (26) |
- * Club domestic league appearances and goals as of 16:48, 21 November 2019 (UTC) ‡ National team caps and goals as of 17 November 2026

Juan Ramón Barrera Pérez (born 2 May 1989) is a Nicaraguan professional footballer who plays as a midfielder for Liga Primera club Real Esteli and captains the Nicaragua national team.

== Club career ==
Nicknamed el Iluminado, he started his professional career at Real Estelí, then had a couple of seasons at Walter Ferretti. In summer 2011 he moved abroad to play for Panamanian outfit Tauro for whom he would play 8 league matches. In February 2012, he rejoined Estelí from Tauro.

In 2013, he became the second Nicaraguan footballer to play in a CONMEBOL First Division, when he was sent out on loan to Deportivo Petare of the Venezuelan Primera División for a six-month stint. He rejoined Estelí in summer 2013.

In early March it was announced that Barrera had signed with Austrian first division team SC Rheindorf Altach becoming the first Nicaraguan to play in Europe

=== Comunicaciones ===
On 23 December 2015, Barrera joined Comunicaciones of the Liga Nacional.

Barrera was a part of Comunicaciones until 1 December 2017, in which he announced his farewell from the club through his social media. Barrera appeared in 76 matches, scoring 9 goals.

=== Metropolitanos ===
On 15 January 2018, Barrera announced his new club through social media to be Metropolitanos F.C of the Venezuelan first division. This marks his second stint in the Venezuelan first division, his first being with Deportivo Petare F.C in 2013.

He was a part of Metropolitanos F.C for approximately 5 months.

=== Boyacá Chicó ===
On 20 June 2018, Barrera announced he signed with Boyacá Chicó F.C of the Colombian league first division.

On 22 July 2018, Barrera got his first start in a 2–2 draw when Boyacá Chicó F.C played their first match of the season against Millionarios F.C.

Barrera got his first win with the team on 18 August 2018, when Boyacá Chicó defeated Atlético Junior 2–1, with Barrera assisting the winning goal in the 87th minute of the game.

== International career ==
Barrera made his international debut for Nicaragua in January 2009, at the UNCAF Nations Cup match against El Salvador and has, as of June 2021,. He has represented his country in 12 FIFA World Cup qualification matches and played at the 2009 and 2011 UNCAF Nations Cups as well as at the 2009, 2017, and 2019 CONCACAF Gold Cups.

=== International goals ===
Scores and results list Nicaragua's goal tally first.

| No. | Date | Venue | Opponent | Score | Result | Competition |
|---|---|---|---|---|---|---|
| 1. | 26 January 2009 | Estadio Tiburcio Carias Andino, Tegucigalpa, Honduras | Belize | 1–1 | 1–1 | 2009 UNCAF Nations Cup |
| 2. | 1 June 2012 | Bayamón Soccer Complex, Bayamón, Puerto Rico | Puerto Rico | 1–3 | 1–3 | Friendly |
| 3. | 23 March 2015 | Nicaragua National Football Stadium, Managua, Nicaragua | Anguilla | 3–0 | 5–0 | 2018 FIFA World Cup qualification |
| 4. | 29 March 2015 | Ronald Webster Park, The Valley, Anguilla | Anguilla | 2–0 | 3–0 | 2018 FIFA World Cup qualification |
| 5. | 8 December 2015 | Nicaragua National Football Stadium, Managua, Nicaragua | Cuba | 1–0 | 5–0 | Friendly |
| 6. | 8 December 2015 | Nicaragua National Football Stadium, Managua, Nicaragua | Cuba | 4–0 | 5–0 | Friendly |
| 7. | 20 January 2017 | Estadio Rommel Fernández, Panama City, Panama | Belize | 1–1 | 3–1 | 2017 Copa Centroamericana |
| 8. | 28 March 2017 | Nicaragua National Football Stadium, Managua, Nicaragua | Haiti | 1–0 | 3–0 | 2017 CONCACAF Gold Cup qualification |
| 9. | 28 March 2017 | Nicaragua National Football Stadium, Managua, Nicaragua | Haiti | 2–0 | 3–0 | 2017 CONCACAF Gold Cup qualification |
| 10. | 28 March 2017 | Nicaragua National Football Stadium, Managua, Nicaragua | Haiti | 3–0 | 3–0 | 2017 CONCACAF Gold Cup qualification |
| 11. | 22 March 2018 | Nicaragua National Football Stadium, Managua, Nicaragua | Cuba | 3–1 | 3–1 | Friendly |
| 12. | 25 March 2018 | Nicaragua National Football Stadium, Managua, Nicaragua | Cuba | 1–0 | 3–3 | Friendly |
| 13. | 8 September 2018 | Arnos Vale Stadium, Arnos Vale, Saint Vincent and the Grenadines | Saint Vincent and the Grenadines | 2–0 | 2–0 | 2019–20 CONCACAF Nations League qualifying |
| 14. | 14 October 2018 | Estadio Eladio Rosabal Cordero, Heredia, Costa Rica | Anguilla | 3–0 | 6–0 | 2019–20 CONCACAF Nations League qualifying |
| 15. | 14 October 2018 | Estadio Eladio Rosabal Cordero, Heredia, Costa Rica | Anguilla | 4–0 | 6–0 | 2019–20 CONCACAF Nations League qualifying |
| 16. | 14 October 2018 | Estadio Eladio Rosabal Cordero, Heredia, Costa Rica | Anguilla | 6–0 | 6–0 | 2019–20 CONCACAF Nations League qualifying |
| 17. | 24 March 2019 | Wildey Turf, Wildey, Barbados | Barbados | 1–0 | 1–0 | 2019–20 CONCACAF Nations League qualifying |
| 18. | 7 June 2019 | Estadio San Juan del Bicentenario, San Juan, Argentina | Argentina | 1–5 | 1–5 | Friendly |
| 19. | 27 March 2021 | Estadio Panamericano, San Cristóbal, Dominican Republic | Turks and Caicos Islands | 1–0 | 7–0 | 2022 FIFA World Cup qualification |
| 20. | 27 March 2021 | Estadio Panamericano, San Cristóbal, Dominican Republic | Turks and Caicos Islands | 5–0 | 7–0 | 2022 FIFA World Cup qualification |
| 21. | 4 June 2021 | Nicaragua National Football Stadium, Managua, Nicaragua | Belize | 3–0 | 3–0 | 2022 FIFA World Cup qualification |
| 22. | 29 January 2022 | Nicaragua National Football Stadium, Managua, Nicaragua | Belize | 2–0 | 4–0 | Friendly |
| 23. | 13 June 2022 | Nicaragua National Football Stadium, Managua, Nicaragua | Bahamas | 1–0 | 4–0 | 2022–23 CONCACAF Nations League B |
| 24. | 24 March 2023 | Nicaragua National Football Stadium, Managua, Nicaragua | Saint Vincent and the Grenadines | 2–1 | 4–1 | 2022–23 CONCACAF Nations League B |
| 25. | 8 June 2024 | FFB Stadium, Belmopan, Belize | Belize | 2–0 | 4–0 | 2026 FIFA World Cup qualification |
| 26. | 14 October 2024 | Nicaragua National Football Stadium, Managua, Nicaragua | French Guiana | 2–2 | 3–2 | 2024–25 CONCACAF Nations League A |

== Honours ==
Real Estelí

- Liga Primera de Nicaragua: 2019 Clausura, 2019 Apertura, 2020 Clausura, 2020 Apertura

== See also ==
- List of men's footballers with 100 or more international caps
