= Oumar Ballo (footballer) =

Malian footballer (born 1991)

Personal information
- Date of birth: April 2, 1991 (age 35)
- Place of birth: Bamako, Mali
- Height: 1.88 m (6 ft 2 in)
- Position: Defender

Youth career
- Baltimore Boys

College career
Years	Team	Apps	(Gls)
2011	CCBC-Essex Knights	15	(2)
2012–2014	UMBC Retrievers	65	(5)

Senior career*
Years	Team	Apps	(Gls)
2012–2013	Baltimore Bohemians	21	(0)
2014	Reading United	7	(1)
2015	Houston Dynamo	0	(0)
2015	→ Charleston Battery (loan)	0	(0)
2016–2017	Swope Park Rangers	41	(1)
2018	Northern Virginia United	2	(0)
- * Club domestic league appearances and goals as of 16 May 2018

Oumar Ballo (born 2 April 1991) is a Malian footballer.

== Career ==
=== College and amateur ===
Ballo began his college soccer career at Community College of Baltimore County in 2011, before transferring to University of Maryland, Baltimore County in 2012.

Ballo also played in the Premier Development League for Baltimore Bohemians in 2012 and 2013, and Reading United A.C. in 2014.

=== Professional ===
On January 15, 2015, Ballo was selected in the second round (30th overall) in the 2015 MLS SuperDraft by Houston Dynamo and signed a professional contract with the club on February 23, 2015.

Ballo signed on loan with United Soccer League side Charleston Battery on March 24, 2015. However, Ballo was waived by Houston on April 23, 2015, without having made a first team appearance for either club. He trialled with D.C. United following his release, but wasn't signed by the Major League Soccer club.

On January 11, 2016, Ballo was signed by United Soccer League side Swope Park Rangers.

On November 30, 2017, Ballo was announced as one of Nashville SC's first signings ahead of their inaugural 2018 United Soccer League season. However, the team later announced that Ballo would not be joining the team due to visa issues.

Ballo spent 2018 with National Premier Soccer League side Northern Virginia United FC, making two regular season appearances and a single play-off appearance for the club.

== Personal ==
Ballo moved to the United States from Mali when he was nine years old, settling with his father and stepmother in Baltimore, Maryland. His father's wife at the time, Audrey Haskins, was instrumental in guiding Oumar's education and introduction to soccer in America. Ballo has 5 siblings one stepbrother and 4 half-sisters between his father and stepmother.
