= Tommy Meyer =

American soccer player (born 1990)

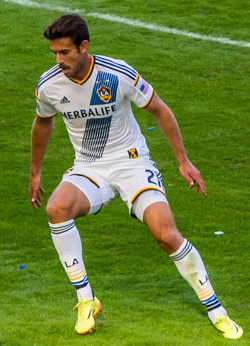
- Meyer in action for LA Galaxy in 2014

Personal information
- Full name: Thomas Meyer
- Date of birth: March 20, 1990 (age 36)
- Place of birth: St. Louis, Missouri, United States
- Height: 6 ft 2 in (1.88 m)
- Position: Defender

Youth career
- 2004–2008: Scott Gallagher SC
- 2005–2006: IMG Soccer Academy
- 2008–2011: Indiana Hoosiers

Senior career*
Years	Team	Apps	(Gls)
2009	Seattle Wolves	11	(0)
2010	Chicago Fire Premier	0	(0)
2012–2015	LA Galaxy	33	(0)
2014	→ LA Galaxy II (loan)	6	(0)
2015	→ LA Galaxy II (loan)	2	(0)
2016	Swope Park Rangers	26	(0)

International career^{‡}
2005–2007	United States U17	11	(0)
2008	United States U20	3	(0)
- * Club domestic league appearances and goals as of October 6, 2016 ‡ National team caps and goals as of June 12, 2014

Thomas Meyer (born March 20, 1990) is an American soccer player.

== Career ==
=== High school ===
Meyer attended St. Louis University High School in St. Louis while also playing for Scott Gallagher Soccer Club.

=== College and amateur ===
Meyer played college soccer for the Indiana University Hoosiers between 2008 and 2011. During his time at Indiana, Meyer was named as a 2011 All-Big Ten Conference First Team and was second in the Big Ten Conference with 7 assists. He is also a member of the Sigma Chi Fraternity.

Meyer also spent time at the national residency program in 2005 and 2006, as well as spending time with USL Premier Development League club Seattle Wolves in 2009.

=== Professional ===
Los Angeles Galaxy selected Meyer in the first round (No. 19 overall) of the 2012 MLS SuperDraft.

Meyer made his debut for Los Angeles Galaxy in a 3–1 loss against Real Salt Lake on March 11, 2012.

LA released Meyer following the 2015 season. In January 2016, he signed with Swope Park Rangers of the United Soccer League.

== Honors ==
=== Club ===
Los Angeles Galaxy

- MLS Cup (2): 2012, 2014
