= Kris Tyrpak =

American soccer player

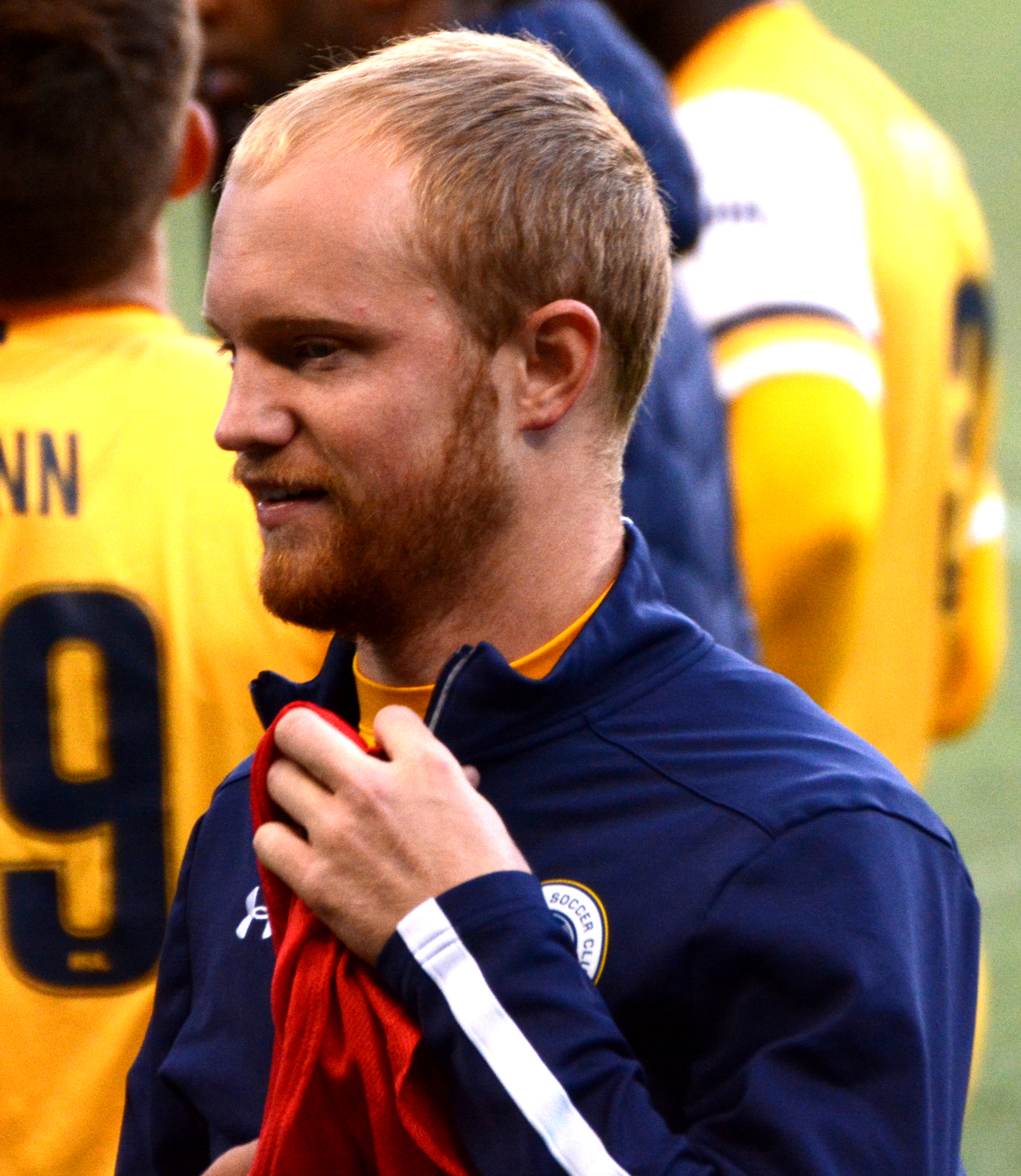
- Tyrpak with Nashville SC in 2018

Personal information
- Full name: Kristopher Evan Tyrpak
- Date of birth: March 19, 1992 (age 34)
- Place of birth: Austin, Texas, United States
- Height: 1.80 m (5 ft 11 in)
- Position: Forward

Youth career
- Lonestar Aztex Academy

College career
Years	Team	Apps	(Gls)
2010–2013	Houston Baptist Huskies	67	(18)

Senior career*
Years	Team	Apps	(Gls)
2012–2013	Austin Aztex	27	(19)
2014	Chivas USA	9	(1)
2015	Austin Aztex	27	(9)
2015	San Antonio Scorpions	6	(2)
2016	Swope Park Rangers	28	(7)
2017–2018	San Antonio FC	33	(7)
2018	Miami FC 2	14	(6)
2018	Nashville SC	5	(0)
2019–2020	Austin Bold	27	(9)

Managerial career
- 2021: South Florida Bulls (assistant)
- * Club domestic league appearances and goals as of October 6, 2020

Kristopher Evan Tyrpak (born March 19, 1992) is an American former professional soccer player who played as a forward.

== Career ==
=== Early career ===
Raised in Dripping Springs, Texas, Tyrpak started his youth career with the Austin Capitals Soccer Club and Lonestar Soccer Club. He also played for Dripping Springs High School for four years, where he received several concussions. As a result, he now wears a head guard during matches. He went on to attend Houston Baptist University where he played college soccer for the Houston Baptist Huskies from 2010 to 2013. He also played for the Austin Aztex of the USL PDL from 2012 to 2013. After the 2013 season Tyrpak was named as the USL PDL MVP after scoring nine goals in 14 games while also recording one assist as the Aztex won the USL PDL title.

=== Chivas USA ===
On January 16, 2014, Tyrpak was drafted 40th overall in the 2014 MLS SuperDraft by Chivas USA. He then made his professional debut in Major League Soccer on March 16, 2014, against the Vancouver Whitecaps FC in which he came on in the 87th minute for Erick Torres as Chivas USA drew 1–1. On October 11, 2014, Tyrpak scored his first Major League Soccer goal against the Colorado Rapids, in which he dribbled around several players before entering the penalty box and scoring.

=== San Jose Earthquakes / Back to Aztex ===
After the folding of Chivas USA in November 2014, Tyrpak was selected in the 2014 MLS Dispersal Draft by San Jose Earthquakes. However, he was waived by San Jose on February 26, 2015, during their pre-season. He re-signed with the Aztex, now playing in the USL, on March 11, 2015.

=== Swope Park Rangers ===
On December 16, 2015, Tyrpak signed for newly formed USL club Swope Park Rangers. Tyrpak scored his first goal for the Swope Park Rangers on April 27 in a game against Vancouver Whitecaps FC 2. Tyrpak helped the team advance to the USL Western Conference Championship.

=== San Antonio FC ===
San Antonio FC announced the signing of Tyrpak for the 2017 USL season on December 6, 2016.

=== Miami FC 2 ===
Tyrpak helped Miami FC advance to the finals and win the National Premier Soccer League (NPSL) National Championship.

=== Nashville SC ===
On August 8, 2018, Tyrpak signed with USL side Nashville SC. On November 14, 2018, Nashville announced that they had not re-signed Tyrpak for the 2019 season.

=== Austin Bold ===
On November 14, 2018, it was announced that Tyrpak would join Austin Bold FC ahead of their inaugural 2019 season.

== Career statistics ==
As of January 18, 2018

Club	Season	League			Playoffs		U.S. Open Cup		CONCACAF		Total	
Club	Season	Division	Apps	Goals	Apps	Goals	Apps	Goals	Apps	Goals	Apps	Goals
Austin Aztex	2012	USL PDL	13	10	—	—	—	—	—	—	13	10
Austin Aztex	2013	USL PDL	14	9	—	—	—	—	—	—	14	9
Chivas USA	2014	MLS	9	1	—	—	1	0	—	—	10	1
Austin Aztex	2015	USL	27	9	1	—	2	0	—	—	29	9
San Antonio Scorpions	2015	NASL	4	2	—	—	—	—	—	—	4	2
Swope Park Rangers	2016	USL	28	7	4	3	—	—	—	—	32	10
Sporting Kansas City	2016	MLS	—	—	—	—	—	—	1	0	1	0
San Antonio FC	2017	USL	26	6	3	0	—	—	—	—	27	6
San Antonio FC	2018	USL	—	—	—	—	—	—	—	—	—	—
Career total			121	44	5	3	3	0	1	0	130	47
