= Ayrton (footballer, born 1994) =

Brazilian footballer

Personal information
- Full name: Ayrton Pinheiro Victor
- Date of birth: 6 May 1994 (age 32)
- Place of birth: São Paulo, Brazil
- Height: 1.82 m (6 ft 0 in)
- Position: Midfielder

Youth career
- –2014: Corinthians

Senior career*
Years	Team	Apps	(Gls)
2014–2016	Corinthians	0	(0)
2014–2015	→ União da Madeira (loan)	30	(1)
2016	→ Tigres do Brasil (loan)	7	(0)
2016	Swope Park Rangers	21	(3)
2017	Tigres do Brasil	3	(0)
2017	Rio Verde	3	(1)
2017–2018	Montceau Bourgogne	21	(2)
2018–2020	Toulon	17	(3)
2020–2023	Mantes 78	20+	(3+)
- * Club domestic league appearances and goals as of 19:56, 22 December 2023 (UTC)

Ayrton Pinheiro Victor (born 6 May 1994) is a Brazilian professional footballer.

== Career ==
=== Early career ===
Ayrton was with Corinthians academy, before progressing to the reserve side in 2014. He spent time on loan with Segunda Liga side União da Madeira and Tigres do Brasil, before transferring to United Soccer League side Swope Park Rangers on 13 May 2016.

=== Swope Park Rangers ===
Ayrton signed for the USL affiliate of Sporting Kansas City, the Swope Park Rangers on 13 May 2016. He scored his first goal against Oklahoma City Energy FC on 18 June before adding three assists in the space of two games in late July against Orange County Blues FC and San Antonio FC.
