= Irvin Herrera =

Salvadoran footballer (born 1991)

Personal information
- Full name: Irvin Enrique Herrera Baires
- Date of birth: 30 August 1991 (age 35)
- Place of birth: San Julián, Sonsonate, El Salvador
- Height: 1.76 m (5 ft 9 in)
- Position: Forward

College career
Years	Team	Apps	(Gls)
2010	Gardner–Webb Runnin' Bulldogs		
2011	Southern Wesleyan Warriors		
2012–2013	NC Wesleyan Battling Bishops		

Senior career*
Years	Team	Apps	(Gls)
2015–2016	Santa Tecla	46	(24)
2016–2018	Saint Louis FC	25	(14)
2017	→ New York Cosmos (loan)	13	(2)
2017–2018	→ FAS (loan)	28	(8)
2019	Alianza	15	(3)
2019	Sukhothai	12	(5)
2020	Guastatoya	5	(0)
2020–2021	FAS		
2021–2022	Santa Tecla	25	(8)
2022	Platense Zacatecoluca	25	(7)

International career^{‡}
2015–	El Salvador	15	(2)
- * Club domestic league appearances and goals as of 14 January 2023 ‡ National team caps and goals as of 9 October 2017

Irvin Enrique Herrera Baires (born 30 August 1991) is a Salvadoran footballer who plays as a forward.

== Club career ==
Irvin Herreras youth career was split between the SYA Copperheads and National Power JBS FC located out of Westchester County, New York. Herrera was coached at JBS FC by coaching legend Jonathan Langer, While at JBS FC Herrera helped lead JBS FC to a #2 National Ranking and was instrumental in leading JBS FC to multiple tournament titles to include the Annandale Premier Cup, Potomac Memorial Day Tournament, Disney International Cup, as well as other titles.

Herrera played for Santa Tecla in the Primera División of El Salvador from 2014 to 2016, making 42 appearances and scoring 23 goals during league play. Additionally, Herrera played for the club during the 2015–16 CONCACAF Champions League, scoring his team's lone goal in a 2–1 defeat to Real Salt Lake of Major League Soccer.

On February 19, 2016, USL club Saint Louis FC announced their signing of Herrera from Santa Tecla. He scored his first goal for the club on May 7 against the Swope Park Rangers. Two weeks later he became the first Saint Louis FC player to register a hat trick, tallying four goals in a match against the Tulsa Roughnecks, and was named the USL's Player of the Week.

=== Loan to FAS ===
In December 2017, Herrera signed with FAS for the Clausura 2018, on loan from Saint Louis FC. In December 2018, Herrera's contract was not renewed by FAS.

== Career statistics ==
Scores and results list El Salvador's goal tally first.

#	Date	Venue	Opponent	Score	Result	Competition
1	11 June 2015	Warner Park, Basseterre, St Kitts and Nevis	Saint Kitts and Nevis	1–0	2–2	2018 FIFA World Cup qualification
2	22 January 2017	Estadio Rommel Fernández, Panama City, Panama	Nicaragua	1–0	1–0	2017 Copa Centroamericana

== Honours ==
Santa Tecla

- Primera División: Clausura 2015
