= Jacob VanCompernolle =

American soccer player

Personal information
- Full name: Jacob Leon VanCompernolle
- Date of birth: August 2, 1993 (age 33)
- Place of birth: Dallas, Texas, United States
- Height: 1.80 m (5 ft 11 in)
- Position: Defender

Youth career
- 2008–2011: Dallas Texans
- 2011–2014: UNC Wilmington Seahawks

Senior career*
Years	Team	Apps	(Gls)
2013	Ottawa Fury	14	(0)
2014	GPS Portland Phoenix	10	(0)
2015	OKC Energy FC	23	(0)
2016	Swope Park Rangers	7	(0)
2016	→ OKC Energy FC (loan)	15	(0)
2017	OKC Energy U23	12	(2)
- * Club domestic league appearances and goals as of April 13, 2020

Jacob Leon VanCompernolle (born August 2, 1993) is an American professional soccer player who last played as a defender for OKC Energy U23 in the Premier Development League.

== Career ==
=== College & Youth ===
VanCompernolle played four years college soccer at the University of North Carolina at Wilmington between 2011 and 2014. In his senior year, VanCompernolle was the CAA's Defensive Player-of-the-Year and a first-team All-CAA honoree.

While at college, VanCompernolle appeared for USL PDL side Ottawa Fury during their 2013 season and GPS Portland Phoenix during their 2014 season.

=== Professional ===
After trials with New England Revolution and Colorado Rapids, VanCompernolle signed with United Soccer League side Oklahoma City Energy on February 11, 2015.

VanCompernolle signed with Sporting Kansas City's United Soccer League development side Swope Park Rangers on January 8, 2016.
