= Matt Whatley (footballer) =

Welsh footballer (born 1992)

Personal information
- Date of birth: 2 October 1992 (age 34)
- Place of birth: Wales
- Position: Defender

Team information
- Current team: Hawke's Bay United FC

Youth career
- –2010: Swansea City
- 2010–2011: Cardiff City

Senior career*
Years	Team	Apps	(Gls)
2011–2012	Neath	1	(0)
2012	Carmarthen Town	7	(0)
2013–2014	AFC United	19	(1)
2014–2015	Syrianska IK	8	(0)
2015	UMF Selfoss	22	(0)
2016	Port Talbot Town		
2016	Tulsa Roughnecks	16	(0)
2016–	Hawke's Bay United FC		

International career
- Wales U18
- * Club domestic league appearances and goals as of 19 December 2016

Matt Whatley (born 2 October 1992) is a Welsh footballer.

== Career ==
=== Youth ===
Whatley is a product of the Swansea City development system. He went on trial with Cardiff City in April 2010 after being released by Swansea at the end of the previous season. He appeared in a U-21 match for Swansea in a 1–1 draw with Exeter City. He was still on trial and it was believed he could still be signed by the club in July 2011. During his final season with Swansea, he captained the youth team which captured the Welsh Cup. While on scholarship with Swansea, he appeared in 15 matches for the club before the age of 16.

=== Senior ===
Despite interest from Cardiff, Whatley signed for Neath FC of the Welsh Premier League in July 2011. He also spit time during the 2011/12 season with Carmarthen Town, also of the Premier League. In total, he made 7 appearances for Carmarthen. For the next two seasons, Whatley plied his trade in the third division of Swedish football, the Division 1 Norra. He made 19 appearances and scored 1 goal for AFC United during the 2013 season before making 8 appearances for Syrianska IK in 2014. For the 2015 season, Whatley signed for UMF Selfoss of the 1. deild karla, the second tier of the Icelandic football league system. He played every minute of all 22 league matches for the club over the season. Following his season with Selfoss, he was named the club's Player of the Year. In July 2016, Whatley returned to Wales by signing for Port Talbot Town. Whatley signed for Tulsa Roughnecks FC of the United Soccer League in March 2016.

=== International ===
Whatley represented Wales at youth level, including as part of the squad for the Tri-Nations Cup in Dublin. He represented Wales at the Under-18 level against New Zealand, Scotland, Ireland, and England.
