= Mark Anthony Gonzalez =

Canadian soccer player (born 1994)

Personal information
- Date of birth: September 9, 1994 (age 32)
- Place of birth: Toronto, Ontario, Canada
- Height: 1.83 m (6 ft 0 in)
- Position: Forward

Youth career
- 2003-?: Bolton SC
- 2014: Sigma FC
- 2015: Toronto FC

College career
Years	Team	Apps	(Gls)
2012–2015	Evansville Purple Aces	71	(27)

Senior career*
Years	Team	Apps	(Gls)
2014	Sigma FC	8	(3)
2015	Toronto FC III	7	(3)
2016–2017	Swope Park Rangers	46	(14)
2018	Reno 1868	5	(0)
- * Club domestic league appearances and goals as of October 13, 2018 ‡ National team caps and goals as of March 29, 2017

Mark Anthony Gonzalez (born September 9, 1994) is a Canadian soccer player.

== Club career ==
Gonzalez spent four years playing college soccer at the University of Evansville between 2012 and 2015.

While at college, Gonzalez appeared for Sigma FC in League 1 Ontario, and Premier Development League side TFC Academy.

Gonzalez was signed by United Soccer League side Swope Park Rangers on January 20, 2016.

Gonzalez moved to USL side Reno 1868 on January 5, 2018. Gonzalez was released by Reno on December 3, 2018.

== International career ==
Gonzalez was born in Canada to a Cuban father and Italian mother. He was called in to the Canada Under-23 National Team for a tournament in March 2017 in Qatar. The Canada U-23s played a pair of games against Uzbekistan and Qatar on March 25 and 28, 2017 respectively.

== Career statistics ==
As of October 27, 2018

Club	League	Season	League		Playoffs		Domestic Cup		Total	
Club	League	Season	Apps	Goals	Apps	Goals	Apps	Goals	Apps	Goals
Sigma FC	League1 Ontario	2014	8	3	0	0	0	0	8	3
Toronto FC III	PDL	2015	7	3	0	0	0	0	7	3
Swope Park Rangers	USL	2016	27	9	4	3	0	0	31	12
Swope Park Rangers	USL	2017	19	5	0	0	0	0	19	5
Swope Park Rangers	Total		46	14	4	3	0	0	50	17
Reno 1868 FC	USL	2018	5	0	2	0	1	0	8	0
Career total			66	20	6	3	1	0	73	22
