= Kévin Oliveira =

Cape Verdean footballer

Personal information
- Full name: Kévin Renato Fortes Oliveira
- Date of birth: 8 June 1993 (age 33)
- Place of birth: São Vicente, Cape Verde
- Height: 1.70 m (5 ft 7 in)
- Position: Midfielder

Team information
- Current team: APEA Akrotiri
- Number: 27

Youth career
- 2010–2014: Benfica

Senior career*
Years	Team	Apps	(Gls)
2015–2016	Benfica B	0	(0)
2015–2016	→ Sporting Covilhã (loan)	8	(1)
2016–2017	Swope Park Rangers	30	(6)
2017	Sporting Kansas City	2	(0)
2017	→ Swope Park Rangers (loan)	3	(0)
2018–2019	Ottawa Fury	64	(10)
2020–2022	Doxa Katokopias	37	(0)
2022–2023	AEZ Zakakiou	14	(3)
2023	Anagennisi Deryneia	10	(6)
2023–2024	ASIL Lysi	9	(0)
2024	Achyronas-Onisilos	8	(0)
2024–2025	Anagennisi Deryneia	25	(7)
2025–	APEA Akrotiri	24	(1)

International career^{‡}
2017	Cape Verde	1	(0)
- * Club domestic league appearances and goals as of 3 May 2026 ‡ National team caps and goals as of 10 October 2017

Kévin Renato Fortes Oliveira (born 8 June 1993) is a Cape Verdean professional footballer who plays as a midfielder for APEA Akrotiri.

== Club career ==
=== Swope Park Rangers ===
Oliveira signed for USL club the Swope Park Rangers on February 3, 2016. He scored his first goal for the side in its first-ever game on March 26, 2016 against Portland Timbers 2. Oliveira had three goals and four assists before suffering a torn ACL in his left knee in training in late June 2016, which ended his season.

=== Sporting Kansas City ===
On 15 September 2017, Oliveira signed with Major League Soccer side Sporting Kansas City, the parent club of Swope Park Rangers.

On 10 December 2017, Oliveira was traded by Sporting Kansas City along with Tyler Pasher and a second-round pick in the 2018 MLS SuperDraft to Atlanta United FC in exchange for Kenwyne Jones, Alexander Tambakis, and a fourth-round pick in the 2021 MLS SuperDraft.

=== Ottawa Fury ===
On 18 January 2018, Oliveira signed with USL side Ottawa Fury FC.

== International career ==
Oliveira made his debut for the Cape Verde national team in a 2018 World Cup qualifier loss to Senegal in October 2017.
