= Sporting Kansas City II =

U.S. professional soccer team

- Nicknames: Rangers, SPR, SKCII
- Founded: October 22, 2015; 10 years ago as Swope Park Rangers
- Stadium: Swope Soccer Village; Kansas City, Missouri
- Capacity: 3,500
- Owner: Sporting Club
- Head coach: Lee Tschantret
- League: MLS Next Pro
- 2025: 14th, Western Conference; Playoffs: DNQ
- Website: www.sportingkc.com/skcii
Home colors	Away colors

Sporting Kansas City II is a MLS Next Pro club affiliated with Sporting Kansas City of Major League Soccer. For the 2022 season they will play their home games at Rock Chalk Park at the University of Kansas in Lawrence, Kansas, as well as Swope Soccer Village in Kansas City, Missouri. They were formerly known as the Swope Park Rangers. The club is headquartered alongside Sporting Kansas City at Sporting Park in Kansas City, Kansas.

== History ==
On October 22, 2015, the team was officially announced as the USL's 30th franchise, as were the Swope Park Rangers name, color scheme and logo. The Rangers replaced Oklahoma City Energy FC as SKC's USL affiliate, and was named after a nickname for SKC reserve squad in 2008. The team is Sporting Kansas City's third USL affiliate in the team's history, after previously having partnered with Orlando City SC and Oklahoma City Energy FC. Canadian Marc Dos Santos, who led Ottawa Fury FC to the NASL Soccer Bowl in 2015, was named the first head coach of the Rangers on November 20, 2015.

The Rangers finished their inaugural season in 2016 with a 14–10–6 record and finished fourth in the Western Conference. The side advanced to the 2016 USL Cup Final, becoming just the second team in USL history to do so in its inaugural season. The Rangers beat LA Galaxy II, Orange County SC and Vancouver Whitecaps FC 2 en route to the final where the side eventually fell 5–1 to New York Red Bulls II at Red Bull Arena. Goalkeeper Adrian Zendejas and winger Tyler Pasher were each signed by parent club Sporting Kansas City at the end of the season.

Following the conclusion of the 2016 season, Marc Dos Santos departed to take over at newly founded NASL club the San Francisco Deltas. His assistant for the 2016 campaign, Nikola Popovic, took the reins ahead of the 2017 season. The side continued to have success as Popovic led the team to a 17–8–7 record in the West and another fourth-place finish. Sporting KC also signed four more players from SPR during 2017 in Amer Didic, James Musa, Kharlton Belmar and Kevin Oliveira. Popovic resigned as head coach on November 17, 2017, after leading Swope Park to their second consecutive conference championship.

On September 30, 2019, the club announced that it would re-brand as Sporting Kansas City II ahead of the 2020 USL Championship season.

=== MLS Next Pro ===
The club announced on December 6, 2021, that it was joining the inaugural 21-team MLS Next Pro season starting in 2022. Former Sporting Kansas City player Benny Feilhaber was named the team's head coach for the 2022 season, where he was the head coach through the 2024 season.

== Location ==
The team is headquartered out of Sporting Park in Kansas City, Kansas. For the 2022 and 2023 seasons, they split matches between Rock Chalk Park at the University of Kansas in Lawrence, Kansas, as well as Swope Soccer Village in Kansas City, Missouri.

When the team was known as Swope Park Rangers they played at Swope Soccer Village in Kansas City, Missouri as permanent home venue for the 2016 and 2017 USL seasons, although occasional matches were played at Children's Mercy Park during those first two seasons. For the 2018 season, the Rangers moved to Shawnee Mission District Stadium in Overland Park, Kansas for home USL matches. The move to Shawnee Mission South District Stadium was in response to new USL stadium standards, requiring seating for at least 5,000 fans, that were not met by Swope Soccer Village. The 7,500-seat Shawnee Mission South District Stadium had received $6 million in improvements between fall 2016 and spring 2017. After just two home matches into the season, the Rangers announced that all home matches would be moved to Children's Mercy Park for the remainder of the 2018 USL season. The move came just days after allegations were reported that there had been issues with the quality of the artificial-turf field at Shawnee Mission South.

== Players and staff ==
=== Roster ===
As of February 26, 2025

Note: Flags indicate national team as defined under FIFA eligibility rules; some limited exceptions apply. Players may hold more than one non-FIFA nationality.

No.	Pos.	Nation	Player
34	DF	USA	Daniel Russo
35	DF	USA	Mitch Ferguson
37	FW	USA	Tega Ikoba
41	DF	FRA	Pierre Lurot
42	DF	USA	Alex Cunningham
44	MF	USA	Gael Quintero
47	MF	USA	Trevor Burns
48	MF	USA	Blaine Mabie
75	MF	USA	Zamir Loyo Reynaga
76	MF	USA	Johann Ortiz
88	MF	USA	Shane Donovan
91	GK	USA	Jacob Molinaro
96	FW	USA	Missael Rodríguez

Signed to first team contract with MLS affiliate Sporting Kansas City.
Sporting Kansas City Academy player.

=== Technical staff ===
- (United States) Lee Tschantret – head coach
- (United States) Luis Pacheco – assistant coach

== Year-by-year ==
As of September 25, 2026

Year	USL Championship							Position		Playoffs	Top Scorer ^{1}	
Year	P	W	L	D	GF	GA	Pts	Conf.	Overall	Playoffs	Player	Goals
2016	30	14	10	6	45	36	48	4th, Western	9th	Runners-up	(Canada) Mark Anthony Gonzalez	9
2017	32	17	8	7	55	37	58	4th, Western	5th	Runners-up	(Grenada) Kharlton Belmar	15
2018	34	15	11	8	52	53	53	7th, Western	11th	Conference semifinals	(Guinea) Hadji Barry	17
2019	34	6	20	8	46	80	26	18th, Eastern	36th	Did not qualify	(United States) Wilson Harris	12
2020	16	5	10	1	21	30	16	12th, Eastern; 4th, Group E	23rd	Did not qualify	(United States) Wilson Harris	8
2021	32	4	20	8	31	64	20	15th, Eastern	30th	Did not qualify	(Democratic Republic of the Congo) Enoch Mushagalusa	8
Year	MLS Next Pro							Position		Playoffs	Top Scorer ^{1}	
Year	P	W	D	L	GF	GA	Pts	Conf.	Overall	Playoffs	Player	Goals
2022	24	9	3	12	31	38	31	8th, Eastern	15th	Did not qualify	(Ghana) Rauf Salifu	6
2023	28	13	6	9	59	41	49	3rd, Western	7th	Conference quarterfinals	(Spain) Pau Vidal	11
2024	28	10	6	12	53	57	38	10th, Western	21st	Did not qualify	(Canada) Kamron Habibullah	11
2025	28	3	6	19	30	67	17	14th, Western	29th	Did not qualify	(Canada) Medgy Alexandre	8
2026	28	6	4	18	36	75	23	13th, Western	27th	Did not qualify	(United States) Tega Ikoba	9

1. Top Scorer includes statistics from league matches only.

=== Head coaches ===
- Includes USL regular season, USL playoffs

Coach	Nationality	Start	End	Games	Win	Loss	Draw	Win %
Marc Dos Santos	Canada	November 20, 2015	November 21, 2016	34	17	11	6	50.00
Nikola Popovic	Serbia	November 21, 2016	November 17, 2017	36	20	9	7	55.56
Paulo Nagamura	Brazil	December 4, 2017	November 18, 2021	87	27	43	17	31.03
Benny Feilhaber	United States	January 12, 2022	November 14, 2024	81	32	34	15	39.51
István Urbányi	Hungary	January 30, 2025	August 12, 2025	21	2	15	4	9.52
Ike Opara	United States	August 12, 2025	February 3, 2026	8	1	5	2	12.50
Lee Tschantret	United States	February 3, 2026	August 9, 2026	27	5	18	4	18.52

=== Average attendance ===
Year	Reg. season	Playoffs
2016	1,753	2,329
2017	1,015	1,724
2018	881	—
2019	505	—
2020	N/A	—
2021	N/A	—
2022	N/A	—

== Honors ==
- USL Cup
  - Runners-up (2): 2016, 2017
- Western Conference
  - Winners (Playoffs): 2016, 2017
