= The Voice Brasil season 8 =

The Voice Brasil
- Season 8
- Hosted by: Tiago Leifert
- Judges: Michel Teló; Ivete Sangalo; Iza; Lulu Santos
- Winner: Tony Gordon
- Winning coach: Michel Teló

Release
- Original network: Rede Globo
- Original release: July 30 – October 3, 2019

Season chronology
- ← Previous; Season 7 Next → Season 9

The eighth season of The Voice Brasil, premieres on Rede Globo on July 30, 2019 in the 10:30 / 9:30 p.m. (BRT / AMT) slot immediately following the primetime telenovela A Dona do Pedaço.

Ivete Sangalo, Lulu Santos and Michel Teló are joined by pop singer Iza, who replaced Carlinhos Brown, thus making it the first season to have two female coaches. With Brown's departure, Lulu serves as the last remaining coach from the show's inaugural season.

Tony Gordon was announced the winner of the season on October 3, 2019, making him the fourth stolen artist to win in the show's history after Samantha Ayara in the sixth season, Mylena Jardim in the fifth season, and Danilo Reis & Rafael in the third season, as well as the oldest winner in the entire The Voice franchise to date (at the age of 53). Gordon's victory also marks a fifth straight win for Michel Teló, who became the first coach in the world to win five consecutive times.

== Teams ==
Key

- Winner
- Runner-up
- Third place
- Fourth place
- Eliminated in the Live shows
- Eliminated in the Live playoffs
- Eliminated in the Showdowns
- Stolen in the Battle rounds
- Eliminated in the Battle rounds

Coaches	Top 64 artists					
Michel Teló						
Michel Teló	Tony Gordon	Mobi Colombo	Bia Ferraz	Tatila Krau	Bruna de Paula	Élri El
Michel Teló	Fabiana Oliveira	Litha	Maria Kamila	Samuel Marques	Yolanda de Paulo	~~Heloísa Ribeiro~~
Michel Teló	~~Winnie~~	Bruna Farias	Fernando Junior	Isabella Arantes	Nina Oliveira	Regiane Balena
Michel Teló	Rosana Brown					
Ivete Sangalo						
Ivete Sangalo	Willian Kessley	Ramon & Rafael	Rebeca Lindsay	Samara Alves	Camilla Marotti	Carol Naemi
Ivete Sangalo	Catarina Rosa	Heloísa Ribeiro	Luiz Celestino	Mariella	Steici Lauser	~~Larissa Marinonio~~
Ivete Sangalo	~~Mari Bodas~~	Adrya Almeida	Clara Castro	Déia Silva	Filipe Shimizu	Maria Luiza
Ivete Sangalo	Marielly Santos					
Iza						
Iza	Ana Ruth	Edyelle Brandão	Alexa Marrie	Luana Berti	Lara Alanys	Mari Bodas
Iza	Aaron Modesto	Larissa Marinonio	Marta Souza	NoElle	Winnie	~~Élri El~~
Iza	~~Gaby Olliver~~	~~Larissa Mendes~~	~~Pollyana Caires~~	~~Tony Gordon~~	~~Willian Kessley~~	Amanda Magalhães
Iza	Karine Rayne					
Lulu Santos						
Lulu Santos	Lúcia Muniz	Pollyana Caires	EL1	Paula Araújo	Gaby Olliver	Flora Cruz
Lulu Santos	Dan Abranches	Larissa Mendes	Pâmella Lopes	Rik Oliveira	Tamires Santana	~~Camilla Marotti~~
Lulu Santos	~~Tatila Krau~~	Carol Coutas	Dani Vendramini	Luana Lima	Luciano Bhea	Samara Bueno
Lulu Santos	Vidal Assis					
Note: Italicized names are stolen artists (names struck through within former teams).

== Blind auditions ==
In this season, the number of blocks available per coach was raised, from one block to two blocks.

Key

✔	Coach pressed "I WANT YOU" button
	Artist defaulted to a coach's team
	Artist picked a coach's team
	Artist eliminated with no coach pressing their button
	Artist is an 'All Star' contestant
✘	Coach pressed "I WANT YOU" button, but was "blocked" by Teló
✘	Coach pressed "I WANT YOU" button, but was "blocked" by Ivete
✘	Coach pressed "I WANT YOU" button, but was "blocked" by Iza
✘	Coach pressed "I WANT YOU" button, but was "blocked" by Lulu

=== Episode 1 (July 30) ===
Order	Artist	Age	Hometown	Song	Coach's and contestant's choices			
Order	Artist	Age	Hometown	Song	Teló	Ivete	Iza	Lulu
1	Tony Gordon	53	São Paulo	"You Are So Beautiful"	✔	✔	✔	✔
2	Carol Coutas	32	Petrópolis	"Brasil"	✔	—	—	✔
3	Maria Kamila	29	João Pessoa	"Feira do Mangaio"	✔	—	—	—
4	Alexa Marie	46	São Paulo	"Somebody Else's Guy"	✔	✔	✔	✘
5	Clara Castro	22	Prado	"Is This Love"	✔	✔	✔	—
6	Bruna de Paula	25	Rio de Janeiro	"Malandro"	✔	✔	✔	✔
7	Monique Elen	27	Maringá	"Radioactive"	—	—	—	—
8	Fernando Junior	30	São Paulo	"Trovão"	✔	—	—	✔
9	Paula Araújo	23	Passo Fundo	"Bohemian Rhapsody"	—	—	—	✔
10	Rebeca Lindsay	28	Belém	"Disk Me"	—	✔	—	—

=== Episode 2 (Aug. 1) ===
Order	Artist	Age	Hometown	Song	Coach's and contestant's choices			
Order	Artist	Age	Hometown	Song	Teló	Ivete	Iza	Lulu
1	Lara Alanys	18	São Paulo	"Crazy in Love"	✔	✔	✔	✔
2	Luciano Bhea	48	Rio de Janeiro	"Esperando Aviões"	—	—	—	✔
3	Steici Lauser	17	Sapiranga	"River"	✔	✔	✘	—
4	Willian Kessley	26	Goiânia	"Pra Você Acreditar"	✔	✔	✔	✔
5	Mobi Colombo	17	Maringá	"Naked"	✔	—	✔	—
6	Jullie Costa	24	Rio de Janeiro	"Por Onde Andei"	—	—	—	—
7	Regiane Balena	25	Quilombo	"Ciumeira"	✔	—	—	—
8	Edyelle Brandão	21	Valença	"Who's Loving You"	✔	✔	✔	✔
9	Samara Bueno	30	Americana	"You Got It"	✔	—	—	✔
10	Ramon & Rafael	18–19	São Gonçalo do Rio Abaixo	"Péssimo Negócio"	✔	✔	—	—
11	Litha	28	Blumenau	"Sete Vidas"	✔	—	✔	—
12	Carol Naemi	20	Maringá	"It's a Man's Man's Man's World"	—	✔	✔	—

=== Episode 3 (Aug. 6) ===
Order	Artist	Age	Hometown	Song	Coach's and contestant's choices			
Order	Artist	Age	Hometown	Song	Teló	Ivete	Iza	Lulu
1	Camilla Marotti	28	Rio de Janeiro	"Fallin'"	✔	—	✔	✔
2	Stefanny Massena	20	Conceição do Coité	"Flor e o Beija-Flor"	—	—	—	—
3	Mariella	27	Campinas	"Dindi"	✔	✔	✔	✔
4	NoElle	30	Salvador	"Born This Way"	—	—	✔	—
5	Élri El	30	Taubaté	"Lay Me Down"	✔	✔	✔	✔
6	Bia Ferraz	23	Goiânia	"Sorte Que Cê Beija Bem"	✔	✔	✔	✘
7	Luana Lima	19	Goiânia	"Bad Liar"	—	—	—	✔
8	Pollyana Caires	17	Espinosa	"When the Party's Over"	✔	✔	✔	✔
9	Nina Oliveira	22	Guarulhos	"Festa"	✔	—	—	—
10	Ana Ruth	18	Juazeiro do Norte	"Sozinho"	—	—	✔	—
11	Patrick Vieira	26	Rio de Janeiro	"Não Precisa Mudar"	—	—	—	—
12	Pâmella Lopes	24	Barra Mansa	"Me and Mr. Jones"	✔	✔	✘	✔
13	Déia Silva	25	Boa Esperança	"Partido Alto"	✔	✔	✔	—

=== Episode 4 (Aug. 8) ===
Order	Artist	Age	Hometown	Song	Coach's and contestant's choices			
Order	Artist	Age	Hometown	Song	Teló	Ivete	Iza	Lulu
1	Rik Oliveira	39	Petrópolis	"Blame It on the Boogie"	✔	✔	✔	✔
2	Isabella Arantes	20	Goiânia	"Deixa Ela Saber"	✔	—	✔	—
3	Jô Borges	54	Maricá	"Acreditar"	—	—	—	—
4	Samara Alves	18	Praia do Zumbi	"I'm Not The Only One"	✔	✔	✘	—
5	Amanda Magalhães	25	Feira de Santana	"Quando Fui Chuva"	—	—	✔	—
6	Yolanda de Paulo	27	Ribeirão Preto	"Desperdiçou"	✔	—	—	—
7	Catarina Rosa	34	Recife	"The Show Must Go On"	—	✔	✔	—
8	Flora Cruz	22	Florianópolis	"Baba"	—	—	—	✔
9	Maria Luiza	25	Porto Alegre	"Tristeza Pé No Chão"	—	✔	—	—
10	Isis Raylanne	17	Potengi	"Foi Deus Quem Fez Você"	—	—	—	—
11	EL1	26	Ituverava	"Essa Mina É Louca"	✔	—	—	✔
12	Mari Bodas	19	Rio de Janeiro	"Apaga a Luz"	—	✔	—	—
13	Vidal Assis	34	Rio de Janeiro	"Estácio, Holly Estácio"	—	—	—	✔
14	Karine Rayne	20	Ipatinga	"Dona de Mim"	✔	✔	✔	✔

=== Episode 5 (Aug. 13) ===
Order	Artist	Age	Hometown	Song	Coach's and contestant's choices			
Order	Artist	Age	Hometown	Song	Teló	Ivete	Iza	Lulu
1	Gaby Olliver	30	São Paulo	"Assim Que Se Faz"	—	✔	✔	—
2	Dani Vendramini	42	Porto Alegre	"You Give Me Something"	✔	✔	✔	✔
3	Samuel Marques	21	Salvador	"Feeling Good"	✔	—	—	—
4	Adrya Almeida	31	Cuiabá	"Os Outros"	—	✔	—	—
5	Lúcia Muniz	16	Montes Claros	"Lonely Day"	✔	✔	—	✔
6	Thais Badu	30	Belém	"Jeito Sexy""(Shy Guy)"	—	—	—	—
7	Marta Souza	38	Taboão da Serra	"One Night Only"	—	—	✔	—
8	Heloísa Ribeiro	18	Crato	"A Vida do Viajante"	✔	—	✔	—
9	Lua	22	Salvador	"Toxic"	—	—	—	—
10	Tamires Santana	29	Salvador	"Estranha Loucura"	—	✘	—	✔
11	Luiz Celestino	32	Ituverava	"Codinome Beija-Flor"	—	✔	—	—
12	Larissa Mendes	26	Belo Horizonte	"Era Uma Vez"	✔	—	✔	✔
13	Juliana Pagung	34	Rio de Janeiro	"Eva"	—	—	—	—

=== Episode 6 (Aug. 15) ===
Order	Artist	Age	Hometown	Song	Coach's and contestant's choices			
Order	Artist	Age	Hometown	Song	Teló	Ivete	Iza	Lulu
1	Fabiana Oliveira	41	Goiânia	"Estranho"	✔	—	—	✔
2	Luana Berti	21	Florianópolis	"Tá ****"	✔	✔	✔	✔
3	Larissa Marinonio	29	Niterói	"Virtual Insanity"	—	✔	—	—
4	Gabriel Guarate	20	Porto Velho	"Ainda Bem"	—	—	—	—
5	Winnie	27	Aracaju	"Talking to the Moon"	✔	✘	—	—
6	Tatila Krau	24	Nova Friburgo	"Set Fire to the Rain"	—	—	—	✔
7	Marielly Santos	22	Santo Antônio do Amparo	"Paciência"	—	✔	✔	—
8	Aaron Modesto	19	Carapicuíba	"Eu Juro"	✔	✔	✔	—
9	Carol Santilia	27	São Paulo	"Dom de Iludir"	—	—	Team full	—
10	Filipe Shimizu	29	Humaitá	"Final Feliz"	—	✔	Team full	—
11	Rosana Brown	46	Brasília	"Mas Quem Te Disse Que Eu Te Esqueço"	✔	Team full	Team full	—
12	Dan Abranches	28	Vitória	"Believer"	✔	Team full	Team full	✔
13	Bruna Farias	29	São Paulo	"Beautiful"	✔	Team full	Team full	Team full

== The Battles ==
The 'block' twist, added in the Battles from last season, is returning in the Battle rounds. With this twist, each coach can use once to prevent one of the other coaches from getting a contestant in the "steals". Each coach has three steals.

Key

	Artist won the Battle and advanced to the Showdowns
	Artist lost the Battle but was stolen by another coach and advanced to the Showdowns
	Artist lost the Battle and was eliminated
✘	Coach pressed "STEAL" button, but was "blocked" by Teló
✘	Coach pressed "STEAL" button, but was "blocked" by Ivete
✘	Coach pressed "STEAL" button, but was "blocked" by Iza
✘	Coach pressed "STEAL" button, but was "blocked" by Lulu

Episode	Coach	Order	Winner	Song	Loser	Steal result			
Episode	Coach	Order	Winner	Song	Loser	Teló	Ivete	Iza	Lulu
Episode 7 (August 20, 2019)	Iza	1	Edyelle Brandão	"The Closer I Get to You"	Élri El	✔	—	N/A	✔
Episode 7 (August 20, 2019)	Ivete Sangalo	2	Catarina Rosa	"Mais Ninguém"	Clara Castro	—	N/A	—	—
Episode 7 (August 20, 2019)	Lulu Santos	3	Dan Abranches	"Try"	Carol Coutas	—	—	—	N/A
Episode 7 (August 20, 2019)	Iza	4	Aaron Modesto	"Morena"	Willian Kessley	✘	✔	N/A	✔
Episode 7 (August 20, 2019)	Michel Teló	5	Samuel Marques	"Coisa de Pele"	Fernando Junior	N/A	—	—	—
Episode 7 (August 20, 2019)	Ivete Sangalo	6	Samara Alves	"Best Part"	Larissa Marinonio	—	N/A	✔	—
Episode 8 (August 22, 2019)	Lulu Santos	1	Pâmella Lopes	"Dangerous Woman"	Camilla Marotti	—	✔	✘	N/A
Episode 8 (August 22, 2019)	Ivete Sangalo	2	Mariella	"Madalena"	Maria Luiza	—	N/A	—	—
Episode 8 (August 22, 2019)	Ivete Sangalo	3	Carol Naemi	"Ain't No Mountain High Enough"	Filipe Shimizu	—	N/A	—	—
Episode 8 (August 22, 2019)	Michel Teló	4	Fabiana Oliveira	"Bem Me Quer"	Nina Oliveira	N/A	—	—	—
Episode 8 (August 22, 2019)	Iza	5	Ana Ruth	"Easy"	Tony Gordon	✔	✔	N/A	✔
Episode 8 (August 22, 2019)	Lulu Santos	6	Rik Oliveira	"Se Eu Quiser Falar Com Deus"	Dani Vendramini	—	—	—	N/A
Episode 9 (August 27, 2019)	Iza	1	Alexa Marrie	"I'm Every Woman"	Gaby Olliver	—	✘	N/A	✔
Episode 9 (August 27, 2019)	Ivete Sangalo	2	Ramon & Rafael	"Ao Vivo e A Cores"	Marielly Santos	—	N/A	—	—
Episode 9 (August 27, 2019)	Michel Teló	3	Litha	"Crazy"	Bruna Farias	N/A	—	—	—
Episode 9 (August 27, 2019)	Michel Teló	4	Maria Kamilla	"Coração Bobo"	Heloísa Ribeiro	N/A	✔	—	—
Episode 9 (August 27, 2019)	Lulu Santos	5	Tamires Santana	"A Carne"	Luciano Bhea	—	Team full	—	N/A
Episode 9 (August 27, 2019)	Iza	6	NoElle	"Toda Forma de Amor"	Amanda Magalhães	—	Team full	N/A	—
Episode 10 (August 29, 2019)	Michel Teló	1	Bia Ferraz	"Se Deus Me Ouvisse"	Regiane Balena	N/A	Team full	—	—
Episode 10 (August 29, 2019)	Lulu Santos	2	Paula Araújo	"The Phantom of the Opera"	Samara Bueno	—	Team full	—	N/A
Episode 10 (August 29, 2019)	Ivete Sangalo	3	Luiz Celestino	"Um Dia de Domingo"	Déia Silva	—	Team full	—	—
Episode 10 (August 29, 2019)	Lulu Santos	4	Lúcia Muniz	"Decode"	Tatila Krau	✔	Team full	✘	N/A
Episode 10 (August 29, 2019)	Michel Teló	5	Bruna de Paula	"Coração em Desalinho"	Rosana Brown	Team full	Team full	—	—
Episode 10 (August 29, 2019)	Iza	6	Lara Alanys	"N"	Pollyana Caires	Team full	Team full	N/A	✔
Episode 11 (September 3, 2019)	Ivete Sangalo	1	Rebeca Lindsay	"De Quem é a Culpa?"	Adrya Almeida	Team full	Team full	—	—
Episode 11 (September 3, 2019)	Michel Teló	2	Mobi Colombo	"Fix You"	Isabella Arantes	Team full	Team full	—	—
Episode 11 (September 3, 2019)	Iza	3	Luana Berti	"Onde Anda Você"	Larissa Mendes	Team full	Team full	N/A	✔
Episode 11 (September 3, 2019)	Lulu Santos	4	Flora Cruz	"Lanterna dos Afogados"	Luana Lima	Team full	Team full	—	Team full
Episode 11 (September 3, 2019)	Ivete Sangalo	5	Steici Lauser	"Shallow"	Mari Bodas	Team full	Team full	✔	Team full
Episode 11 (September 3, 2019)	Iza	6	Marta Souza	"Espelho"	Karine Rayne	Team full	Team full	N/A	Team full
Episode 11 (September 3, 2019)	Lulu Santos	7	EL1	"Na Rua, Na Chuva, Na Fazenda"	Vidal Assis	Team full	Team full	—	Team full
Episode 11 (September 3, 2019)	Michel Teló	8	Yolanda de Paulo	"Sign of the Times"	Winnie	Team full	Team full	✔	Team full

== The Showdowns ==
Key

Artist won the Showdown and advanced to the Live shows
Artist lost the Showdown and was eliminated

Episode	Coach	Order	Song	Artists		Song	Order
Episode	Coach	Order	Song	Winner(s)	Loser	Song	Order
Episode 12 (September 5, 2019)	Michel Teló	2	"What a Wonderful World"	Tony Gordon	Fabiana Oliveira	"Notificação Preferida"	1
Episode 12 (September 5, 2019)	Lulu Santos	4	"My Everything"	Flora Cruz	Dan Abranches	"Blues da Piedade"	3
Episode 12 (September 5, 2019)	Lulu Santos	5	"My Immortal"	Lúcia Muniz			
Episode 12 (September 5, 2019)	Ivete Sangalo	7	"Parado no Bailão"	Ramon & Rafael	Heloísa Ribeiro	"Sebastiana"	6
Episode 12 (September 5, 2019)	Lulu Santos	8	"Bem Querer"	EL1	Larissa Mendes	"Seu Crime"	9
Episode 12 (September 5, 2019)	Iza	10	"I Care"	Edyelle Brandão	Winnie	"Onde Você Mora"	11
Episode 13 (September 10, 2019)	Michel Teló	1	"A Song For You"	Élri El	Litha	"Gita"	2
Episode 13 (September 10, 2019)	Iza	3	"P.Y.T. (Pretty Young Thing)"	Ana Ruth	NoElle	"Amanhã é 23"	5
Episode 13 (September 10, 2019)	Iza	4	"Love on the Brain"	Lara Alanys			
Episode 13 (September 10, 2019)	Ivete Sangalo	6	"All Night Long (All Night)"	Carol Naemi	Steici Lauser	"Dancing with a Stranger"	7
Episode 13 (September 10, 2019)	Iza	9	"Eu Só Preciso Ser"	Mari Bodas	Aaron Modesto	"Café"	8
Episode 13 (September 10, 2019)	Lulu Santos	10	"Pra Me Refazer"	Pollyana Caires	Rik Oliveira	"Sincero"	11
Episode 14 (September 12, 2019)	Ivete Sangalo	2	"Atrasadinha"	Willian Kessley	Luiz Celestino	"País Tropical"	1
Episode 14 (September 12, 2019)	Michel Teló	3	"Juízo Final"	Bruna de Paula	Samuel Marques	"Retalhos de Cetim"	5
Episode 14 (September 12, 2019)	Michel Teló	4	"Amor de Índio"	Mobi Colombo			
Episode 14 (September 12, 2019)	Iza	7	"Vai Malandra"	Luana Berti	Larissa Marinonio	"Malemolência"	6
Episode 14 (September 12, 2019)	Lulu Santos	9	"Always Remember Us This Way"	Paula Araújo	Pâmella Lopes	"Don't Wanna Fight"	8
Episode 14 (September 12, 2019)	Michel Teló	11	"Pride (In the Name of Love)"	Tatila Krau	Maria Kamilla	"Tenho Sede"	10
Episode 15 (September 17, 2019)	Ivete Sangalo	1	"Gravity"	Camilla Marotti	Catarina Rosa	"Pro Dia Nascer Feliz"	2
Episode 15 (September 17, 2019)	Ivete Sangalo	3	"Regime Fechado"	Rebeca Lindsay			
Episode 15 (September 17, 2019)	Michel Teló	4	"Cobaia"	Bia Ferraz	Yolanda de Paulo	"Somewhere Only We Know"	5
Episode 15 (September 17, 2019)	Iza	6	"Hora da União"	Alexa Marrie	Marta Souza	"I'll Make Love To You"	7
Episode 15 (September 17, 2019)	Lulu Santos	8	"Ritmo Perfeito"	Gaby Olliver	Tamires Santana	"Faraó, Divindade do Egito"	9
Episode 15 (September 17, 2019)	Ivete Sangalo	11	"Ribbon In The Sky"	Samara Alves	Mariella	"Olhos Nos Olhos"	10

== Live shows ==
=== Elimination chart ===
Artist's info

- Team Teló
- Team Ivete
- Team Iza
- Team Lulu

Result details

- Winner
- Runner-up
- Third place
- Fourth place
- Saved by the public
- Saved by the coach
- Advanced to the final
- Eliminated

Live show results per week
Artist	Week 1	Week 2		Week 3	
Artist	Week 1	Tuesday	Thursday	Tuesday	Thursday
Tony Gordon	Safe		Safe	Advanced	Winner
Ana Ruth	Safe		Safe	Advanced	Runner-up
Lúcia Muniz		Safe	Safe	Advanced	Third place
Willian Kessley	Safe		Safe	Advanced	Fourth place
Edyelle Brandão	Safe		Safe	Eliminated	Eliminated (week 3)
Mobi Colombo		Safe	Safe	Eliminated	Eliminated (week 3)
Pollyana Caires	Safe		Safe	Eliminated	Eliminated (week 3)
Ramon & Rafael	Safe		Safe	Eliminated	Eliminated (week 3)
Alexa Marrie		Safe	Eliminated	Eliminated (week 2)	
Bia Ferraz	Safe		Eliminated	Eliminated (week 2)	
EL1	Safe		Eliminated	Eliminated (week 2)	
Luana Berti		Safe	Eliminated	Eliminated (week 2)	
Paula Araujo		Safe	Eliminated	Eliminated (week 2)	
Rebeca Lindsay		Safe	Eliminated	Eliminated (week 2)	
Samara Alves		Safe	Eliminated	Eliminated (week 2)	
Tatila Krau		Safe	Eliminated	Eliminated (week 2)	
Camilla Marotti		Eliminated	Eliminated (week 2)		
Élri El		Eliminated	Eliminated (week 2)		
Gaby Olliver		Eliminated	Eliminated (week 2)		
Lara Alanys		Eliminated	Eliminated (week 2)		
Bruna de Paula	Eliminated	Eliminated (week 1)			
Carol Naemi	Eliminated	Eliminated (week 1)			
Flora Cruz	Eliminated	Eliminated (week 1)			
Mari Bodas	Eliminated	Eliminated (week 1)			

=== Week 1 ===
==== Live Playoffs 1 ====
Episode	Coach	Order	Artist	Song	Result
Episode 16 (September 19, 2019)
Episode 16 (September 19, 2019)	Ivete Sangalo	1	Carol Naemi	"Erva Venenosa"	Eliminated
Episode 16 (September 19, 2019)	Ivete Sangalo	2	Ramon & Rafael	"Mulher Maravilha"	Public's vote (51.22%)
Episode 16 (September 19, 2019)	Ivete Sangalo	3	Willian Kessley	"Treasure"	Coach's choice
Episode 16 (September 19, 2019)	Iza	4	Ana Ruth	"Oceano"	Public's vote (61.12%)
Episode 16 (September 19, 2019)	Iza	5	Edyelle Brandão	"What a Girl Wants"	Coach's choice
Episode 16 (September 19, 2019)	Iza	6	Mari Bodas	"Something's Got a Hold on Me"	Eliminated
Episode 16 (September 19, 2019)	Lulu Santos	7	EL1	"Encontrar Alguém"	Coach's choice
Episode 16 (September 19, 2019)	Lulu Santos	8	Flora Cruz	"Wave"	Eliminated
Episode 16 (September 19, 2019)	Lulu Santos	9	Pollyana Caires	"Home"	Public's vote (45.23%)
Episode 16 (September 19, 2019)	Michel Teló	10	Bia Ferraz	"Can't Help Falling In Love"	Coach's choice
Episode 16 (September 19, 2019)	Michel Teló	11	Bruna de Paula	"Sorriso Aberto"	Eliminated
Episode 16 (September 19, 2019)	Michel Teló	12	Tony Gordon	"Você"	Public's vote (53.12%)

=== Week 2 ===
==== Live Playoffs 2 ====
Episode	Coach	Order	Artist	Song	Result
Episode 17 (September 24, 2019)
Episode 17 (September 24, 2019)	Iza	1	Alexa Marrie	"Deeper Love"	Coach's choice
Episode 17 (September 24, 2019)	Iza	2	Lara Alanys	"Bang"	Eliminated
Episode 17 (September 24, 2019)	Iza	3	Luana Berti	"O Tempo não Pára"	Public's vote (67.49%)
Episode 17 (September 24, 2019)	Ivete Sangalo	4	Camilla Marotti	"Close to You"	Eliminated
Episode 17 (September 24, 2019)	Ivete Sangalo	5	Rebeca Lindsay	"Somebody to Love"	Public's vote (55.70%)
Episode 17 (September 24, 2019)	Ivete Sangalo	6	Samara Alves	"Por Enquanto"	Coach's choice
Episode 17 (September 24, 2019)	Lulu Santos	7	Gaby Olliver	"Meu Talismã"	Eliminated
Episode 17 (September 24, 2019)	Lulu Santos	8	Lúcia Muniz	"Equalize"	Public's vote (49.77%)
Episode 17 (September 24, 2019)	Lulu Santos	9	Paula Araújo	"The Sound of Silence"	Coach's choice
Episode 17 (September 24, 2019)	Michel Teló	10	Élri El	"Say Something"	Eliminated
Episode 17 (September 24, 2019)	Michel Teló	11	Mobi Colombo	"Apenas Mais Uma de Amor"	Coach's choice
Episode 17 (September 24, 2019)	Michel Teló	12	Tatila Krau	"Tente Outra Vez"	Public's vote (37.70%)

==== Quarterfinals ====
Episode	Coach	Order	Artist	Song	Result
Episode 18 (September 26, 2019)
Episode 18 (September 26, 2019)	Lulu Santos	1	EL1	"Let's Stay Together"	Eliminated
Episode 18 (September 26, 2019)	Lulu Santos	2	Lúcia Muniz	"Never Enough"	Public's vote (36.87%)
Episode 18 (September 26, 2019)	Lulu Santos	3	Paula Araújo	"Planeta Água"	Eliminated
Episode 18 (September 26, 2019)	Lulu Santos	4	Pollyana Caires	"Corcovado"	Coach's choice
Episode 18 (September 26, 2019)	Ivete Sangalo	5	Ramon & Rafael	"Pais e Filhos"	Public's vote (33.45%)
Episode 18 (September 26, 2019)	Ivete Sangalo	6	Rebeca Lindsay	"O Que Falta em Você Sou Eu"	Eliminated
Episode 18 (September 26, 2019)	Ivete Sangalo	7	Samara Alves	"Skyfall"	Eliminated
Episode 18 (September 26, 2019)	Ivete Sangalo	8	Willian Kessley	"Desafio"	Coach's choice
Episode 18 (September 26, 2019)	Michel Teló	9	Bia Ferraz	"Nem Tchum"	Eliminated
Episode 18 (September 26, 2019)	Michel Teló	10	Mobi Colombo	"True Colors"	Coach's choice
Episode 18 (September 26, 2019)	Michel Teló	11	Tatila Krau	"Dois Rios"	Eliminated
Episode 18 (September 26, 2019)	Michel Teló	12	Tony Gordon	"Unforgettable"	Public's vote (37.46%)
Episode 18 (September 26, 2019)	Iza	13	Alexa Marrie	"Finally"	Eliminated
Episode 18 (September 26, 2019)	Iza	14	Ana Ruth	"Uma Brasileira"	Public's vote (44.33%)
Episode 18 (September 26, 2019)	Iza	15	Edyelle Brandão	"Travessia"	Coach's choice
Episode 18 (September 26, 2019)	Iza	16	Luana Berti	"Ela Vai Voltar"	Eliminated

=== Week 3 ===
==== Semifinals ====
Episode	Coach	Order	Artist	Song	Result		
Episode	Coach	Order	Artist	Song	Public points	Coach points	Total points
Episode 19 (October 1, 2019)
Episode 19 (October 1, 2019)	Ivete Sangalo	1	Ramon & Rafael	"Que Sorte a Nossa"	44.38	00.00	44.38
Episode 19 (October 1, 2019)	Ivete Sangalo	2	Willian Kessley	"Refém"	55.62	20.00	75.62
Episode 19 (October 1, 2019)	Iza	3	Ana Ruth	"Fim de Tarde"	68.83	00.00	68.83
Episode 19 (October 1, 2019)	Iza	4	Edyelle Brandão	"One Moment in Time"	31.17	20.00	51.17
Episode 19 (October 1, 2019)	Lulu Santos	5	Lúcia Muniz	"Crawling"	57.18	20.00	77.18
Episode 19 (October 1, 2019)	Lulu Santos	6	Pollyana Caires	"idontwannabeyouanymore"	42.82	00.00	42.82
Episode 19 (October 1, 2019)	Michel Teló	7	Mobi Colombo	"Será"	36.80	00.00	36.80
Episode 19 (October 1, 2019)	Michel Teló	8	Tony Gordon	"With a Little Help from My Friends"	63.20	20.00	83.20

==== Finals ====
Episode	Coach	Artist	Order	Song	Order	Song	Result
Episode 20 (October 3, 2019)
Episode 20 (October 3, 2019)	Iza	Ana Ruth	1	"Pesadão"	5	"(I Can't Get No) Satisfaction" (with Edyelle Brandão)	Runner-up (30.97%)
Episode 20 (October 3, 2019)	Lulu Santos	Lúcia Muniz	2	"O Amor e o Poder"	6	"Um Pro Outro" (with Tatila Krau)	Third place (16.99%)
Episode 20 (October 3, 2019)	Michel Teló	Tony Gordon	3	"O Portão"	7	"Hey Jude" (with Samara Alves)	Winner (36.62%)
Episode 20 (October 3, 2019)	Ivete Sangalo	Willian Kessley	4	"Deixa Tudo Como Tá"	8	"All Star" (with Rebeca Lindsay)	Fourth place (15.42%)

== Ratings and reception ==
=== Brazilian ratings ===
All numbers are in points and provided by Kantar Ibope Media.

Episode	Title	Air date	Timeslot	SP viewers (in points)	BR viewers (in points)	Source
1	The Blind Auditions 1	July 30, 2019	Tuesday 10:30 p.m.	24.6	23.8	
2	The Blind Auditions 2	August 1, 2019	Thursday 10:30 p.m.	24.1	23.8	
3	The Blind Auditions 3	August 6, 2019	Tuesday 10:30 p.m.	26.9	24.8	
4	The Blind Auditions 4	August 8, 2019	Thursday 10:30 p.m.	26.1	24.8	
5	The Blind Auditions 5	August 13, 2019	Tuesday 10:30 p.m.	26.6	23.3	
6	The Blind Auditions 6	August 15, 2019	Thursday 10:30 p.m.	26.9	23.3	
7	The Battles 1	August 20, 2019	Tuesday 10:30 p.m.	26.7	24.5	
8	The Battles 2	August 22, 2019	Thursday 10:30 p.m.	25.5	24.5	
9	The Battles 3	August 27, 2019	Tuesday 10:30 p.m.	24.9	24.2	
10	The Battles 4	August 29, 2019	Thursday 10:30 p.m.	26.7	24.2	
11	The Battles 5	September 3, 2019	Tuesday 10:30 p.m.	24.7	24.0	
12	Showdown 1	September 5, 2019	Thursday 10:30 p.m.	25.8	24.0	
13	Showdown 2	September 10, 2019	Tuesday 10:30 p.m.	27.0	24.5	
14	Showdown 3	September 12, 2019	Thursday 10:30 p.m.	24.8	24.5	
15	Showdown 4	September 17, 2019	Tuesday 10:30 p.m.	21.7	21.0	
16	Live Playoffs 1	September 19, 2019	Thursday 10:30 p.m.	22.6	21.0	
17	Live Playoffs 2	September 24, 2019	Tuesday 10:30 p.m.	23.0	21.7	
18	Quarterfinals	September 26, 2019	Thursday 10:30 p.m.	24.2	21.7	
19	Semifinals	October 1, 2019	Tuesday 10:30 p.m.	24.2	23.3	
20	Finals	October 3, 2019	Thursday 10:30 p.m.	24.7	23.3	

- In 2019, each point represents 254.892 households in 15 market cities in Brazil (73.015 households in São Paulo).
