= Potengi =

Potengi may refer to:

- Potengi River, a river in Brazil
- Potengi, Ceará, a municipality in Brazil
