= Vitão =

Vitão, Portuguese for "big Victor", may refer to:

- Vitão (footballer, born 1994), Vítor Hugo Rosa Nascimento, Brazilian football midfielder for Bac Ninh
- Vitão (footballer, born February 2000), Vitor Eduardo da Silva Matos, Brazilian football defender for Flamengo
- Vitão (footballer, born September 2000), Victor Matheus dos Santos Gonçalves, Brazilian football defender for Chadormalou Ardakan
- Vitão (footballer, born 2008), Vitor Fernandes Chaves Teixeira, Brazilian football defender for Atlético Mineiro
- Vitão (singer) (born 1999), Brazilian singer and songwriter
