= The Voice Brasil season 9 =

The Voice Brasil
- Season 9
- Hosted by: Tiago Leifert
- Judges: Carlinhos Brown; Michel Teló; Iza; Lulu Santos
- Winner: Victor Alves
- Winning coach: Iza
- Runner-up: Douglas Ramalho
- No. of episodes: 20

Release
- Original network: Rede Globo; Multishow
- Original release: October 15 – December 17, 2020

Season chronology
- ← Previous; Season 8 Next → Season 10

The ninth season of The Voice Brasil, premiered on Rede Globo on October 15, 2020 in the 11:00 / 10:00 p.m. (BRT / AMT) slot immediately following the special re-airing of the telenovela A Força do Querer (2017).

Carlinhos Brown returned to the panel after a one-year hiatus, replacing Ivete Sangalo along with returning coaches Iza, Lulu Santos and Michel Teló, thus making it the first season to have two afro-Brazilian coaches.

Victor Alves was announced the winner of the season on December 17, 2020. This marks Iza's first and only win as a coach and the second female coach to win in the show's history, following Claudia Leitte. It was the first and only time in five years that the competition was not won by an artist from Michel Teló's team.

== Teams ==
Key

- Winner
- Runner-up
- Third place
- Fourth place
- Eliminated in the Live Semifinals
- Eliminated in the Live Playoffs
- Eliminated in the Live Showdowns
- Stolen in the Battle rounds
- Eliminated in the Battle rounds
- Disqualified

Coaches	Top 64 artists				
Carlinhos Brown					
Carlinhos Brown	Izrra	Amanda Coronha	Carla Sceno	Cleane Sampaio	Aline Souza
Carlinhos Brown	Tibí	Angel Sberse	Adma Andrade	Thaline Karajá	Luiza Cruz
Carlinhos Brown	Simone Mazzer	~~Bruna Daré~~	~~Glícia França~~	~~Rava~~	Karina Zeviani
Carlinhos Brown	Alissan	Carlos Júnior	Madina Lyve	Tecca Maris	
Michel Teló					
Michel Teló	Douglas Ramalho	Glícia França	Larissa Vitorino	Manso	Thalita Maciente
Michel Teló	Fabiana Souto	Érica Timóteo	Stephanie Luna	Luana Marques	Sofia Moreno
Michel Teló	Bruna Daré	~~Dan Gentil~~	~~Luiza Cruz~~	~~Sérgio Dorneles~~	~~Ana Canhoto~~
Michel Teló	Tamara Salles	Ana Carvalho	Stefanie Schirmbeck	Nanara Bello	
Iza					
Iza	Victor Alves	Diva Menner	Luciana Ribeiro	Luli	Gui Valença
Iza	Bruna Black	Nath Porto	Rava	Natasha	Filipe Toca
Iza	Paloma Maria	~~Stephanie Luna~~	~~Aline Souza~~	Stanya	Anna Lima
Iza	Gabi Porto	Nanda Lynn	Mayra Rodrigues	Daphne	
Lulu Santos					
Lulu Santos	Ana Canhoto	Dan Gentil	Ed Souza	Luana Granai	Lawany
Lulu Santos	João Marcelo Prevedel	THEF	Rick Santos	NAT	Sérgio Dorneles
Lulu Santos	Alana Sant	~~Paloma Maria~~	~~Nath Porto~~	~~Angel Sberse~~	Nathalia Barreto
Lulu Santos	Gabriel Nogueira	Daniel Ribeiro	Leyllane Carla	Yesica Sales	
Note: Italicized names are stolen artists (names struck through within former teams).

== Coaches and hosts ==
Coaches and Host of The Voice Brasil Season 9

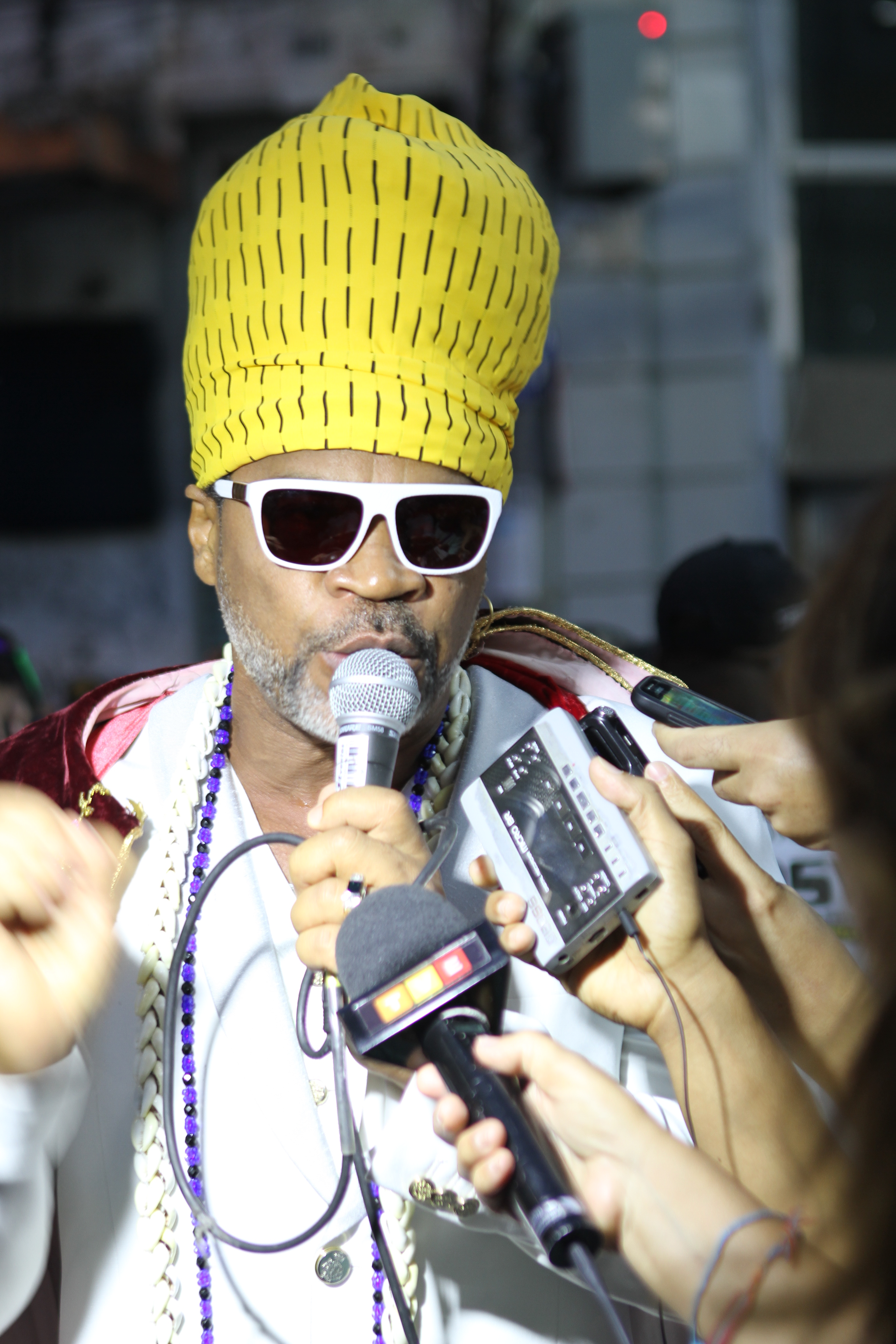
Carlinhos Brown

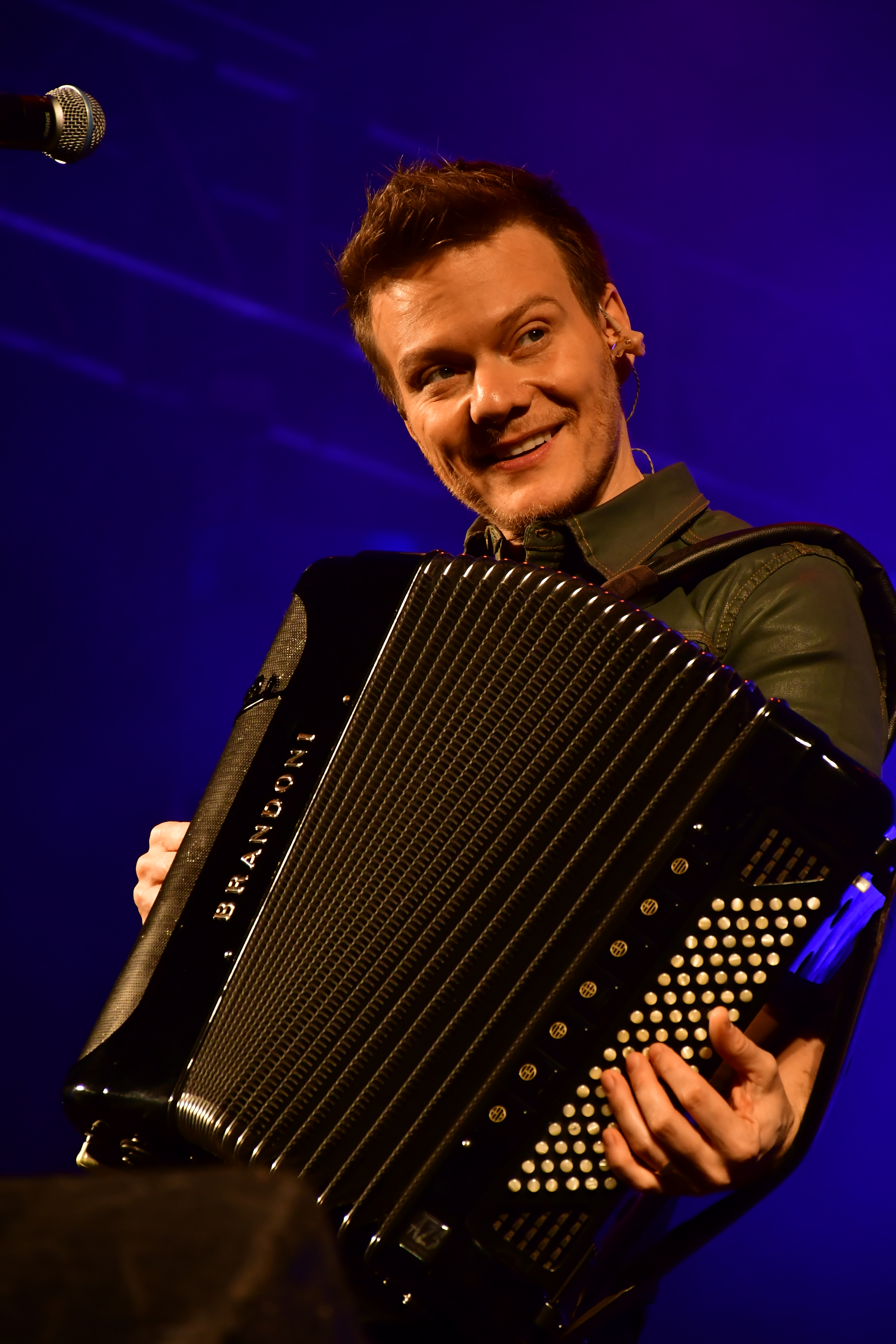
Michel Teló

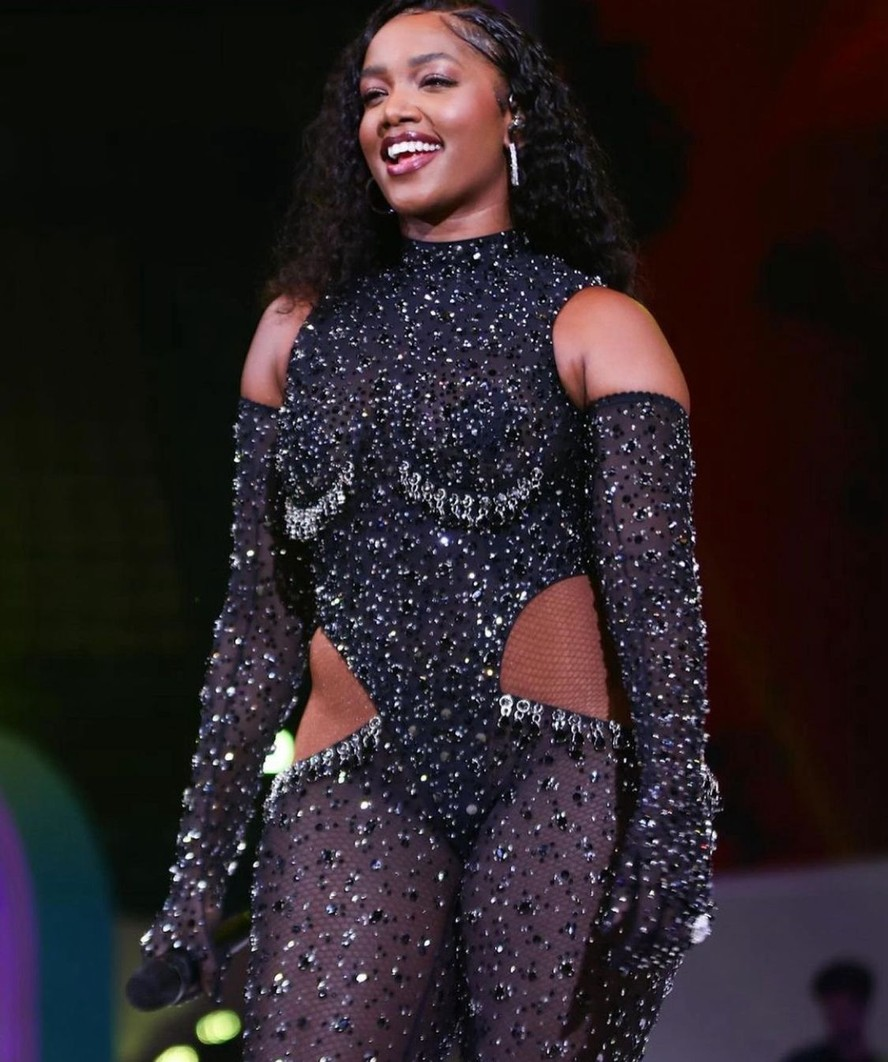
Iza

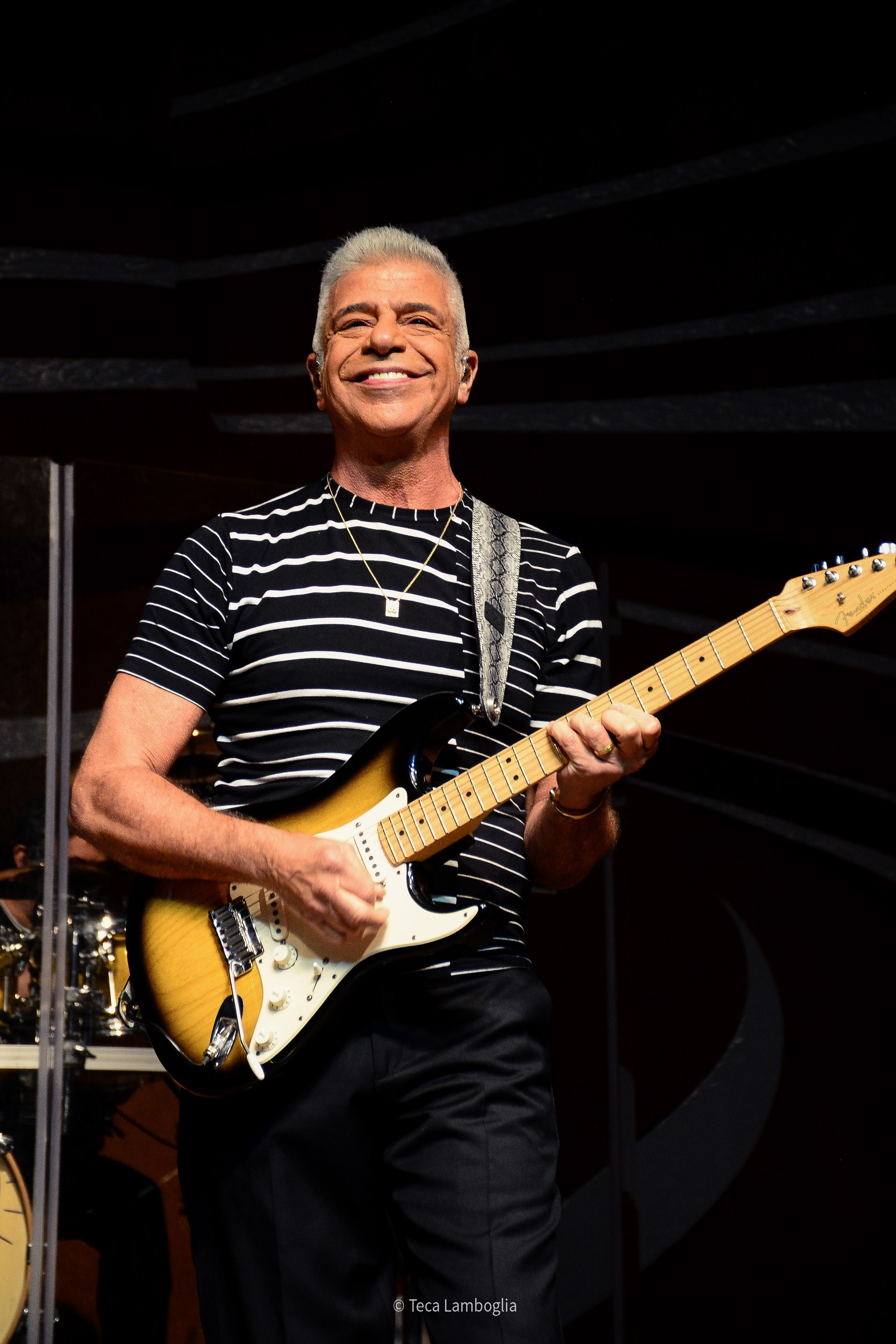
Lulu Santos

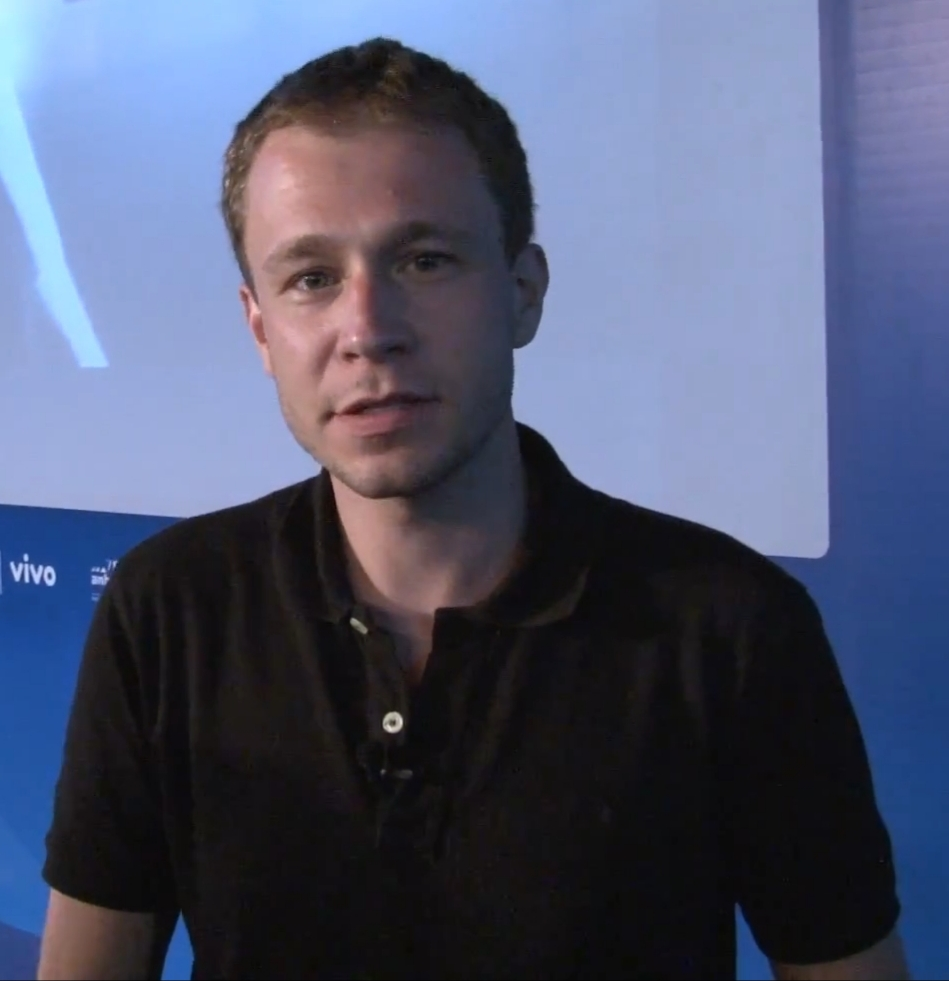
Tiago Leifert (host)

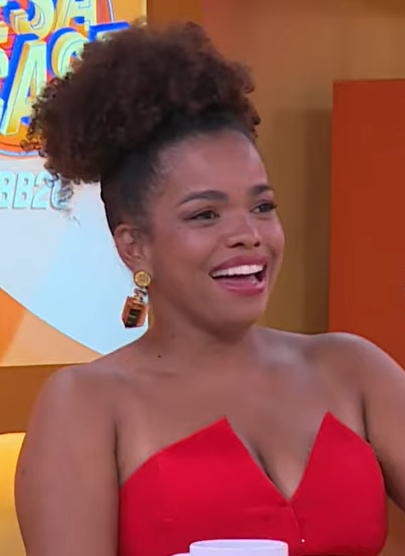
Jennifer Nascimento (Backstage)

== Blind auditions ==
Key

✔	Coach pressed "I WANT YOU" button
	Artist defaulted to a coach's team
	Artist picked a coach's team
	Artist eliminated with no coach pressing their button
	Artist is an 'All Star' contestant
✘	Coach pressed "I WANT YOU" button, but was "blocked" by Brown
✘	Coach pressed "I WANT YOU" button, but was "blocked" by Teló
✘	Coach pressed "I WANT YOU" button, but was "blocked" by Iza
✘	Coach pressed "I WANT YOU" button, but was "blocked" by Lulu

Episode 1 (October 15, 2020)	Order	Artist	Age	Hometown	Song	Coach's and contestant's choices			
Episode 1 (October 15, 2020)	Order	Artist	Age	Hometown	Song	Brown	Teló	Iza	Lulu
Episode 1 (October 15, 2020)	1	Tibí	28	Rio de Janeiro	"Best Part"	✔	✔	✔	✔
Episode 1 (October 15, 2020)	2	Fabiana Souto	43	João Pessoa	"O Xote das Meninas"	✔	✔	✔	✔
Episode 1 (October 15, 2020)	3	NAT	19	Duque de Caxias	"The Climb"	—	—	—	✔
Episode 1 (October 15, 2020)	4	Mayra Rodrigues	18	Divinópolis	"Viva Voz"	—	✘	✔	—
Episode 1 (October 15, 2020)	5	João Marcelo Prevedel	22	Campo Mourão	"Watermelon Sugar"	✔	✔	—	✔
Episode 1 (October 15, 2020)	6	Izrra	23	Rio de Janeiro	"A Boba fui Eu"	✔	✔	✔	✔
Episode 1 (October 15, 2020)	7	Luli	23	São Paulo	"Cuz I Love You"	✔	✔	✔	✔
Episode 1 (October 15, 2020)	8	Tyrone	24	Rio de Janeiro	"Quem Sabe"	—	—	—	—
Episode 1 (October 15, 2020)	9	Thalita Maciente	23	Lavras	"S de Saudade"	✔	✔	✔	✔
Episode 1 (October 15, 2020)	10	Rick Santos	31	São Paulo	"Fulminante"	✔	✔	✔	✔
Episode 1 (October 15, 2020)	11	Simone Mazzer	52	Rio de Janeiro	"Vaca Profana"	✔	—	—	—

=== Episode 2 (Oct. 20) ===
Order	Artist	Age	Hometown	Song	Coach's and contestant's choices			
Order	Artist	Age	Hometown	Song	Brown	Teló	Iza	Lulu
1	Luciana Ribeiro	29	Campos dos Goytacazes	"Make You Feel My Love"	✔	✔	✔	✘
2	Érica Timóteo	30	Governador Valadares	"Enredo Do Meu Samba"	—	✔	✔	—
3	Angel Sberse	37	São Paulo	"Welcome to the Jungle"	✔	✔	✔	✔
4	Sérgio Dorneles	22	Campo Grande	"Boiadeiro Errante"	✔	✔	—	—
5	Vih Mendes	20	Sumaré	"Embrasa"	—	—	—	—
6	Cleane Sampaio	24	Fortaleza	"Pedras que Cantam"	✔	—	—	—
7	Gabriel Nogueira	18	Fortaleza	"Bang"	—	—	✔	✔
8	Tamara Salles	31	Rio de Janeiro	"Desafinado / Out of Tune"	✘	✔	✔	✔
9	Bruna Black	21	Diadema	"Mas que Nada"	✔	✔	✔	—
10	Edra Véras	32	Campina Grande	"Alguém Me Disse"	—	—	—	—
11	Anna Lima	26	Cabo Frio	"Dona de Mim"	—	✔	✔	—
12	Karina Zeviani	45	Jaboticabal	"Sonhos"	✔	—	—	✔

=== Episode 3 (Oct. 22) ===
Order	Artist	Age	Hometown	Song	Coach's and contestant's choices			
Order	Artist	Age	Hometown	Song	Brown	Teló	Iza	Lulu
1	Nanara Bello	27	Arcoverde	"Ciumeira"	✔	✔	—	✔
2	Alana Sant	22	Vitória de Santo Antão	"Billie Jean"	✔	✔	✔	✔
3	Filipe Toca	26	Natal	"Deixa"	✔	✔	✔	✔
4	Yesica Sales	30	Rio de Janeiro	"King of Pain"	—	—	—	✔
5	Adma Andrade	29	Monteiro	"De Volta pro Aconchego"	✔	✔	✔	✔
6	Aline Souza	27	Salvador	"A Loba"	✔	—	✔	✔
7	Dan Gentil	18	Belo Horizonte	"Caça e Caçador"	✔	✔	✔	✔
8	Leyllane Carla	28	Planaltina	"Respeita as Mina"	✔	✘	✔	✔
9	Litieh	32	Brasília	"O Vendedor de Caranguejo"	—	—	—	—
10	Tecca Maris	55	São Paulo	"Miss Celie's Blues"	✔	—	—	✔
11	Daphne	22	Blumenau	"Dog Days Are Over"	✔	✔	✔	✔

=== Episode 4 (Oct. 27) ===
Order	Artist	Age	Hometown	Song	Coach's and contestant's choices			
Order	Artist	Age	Hometown	Song	Brown	Teló	Iza	Lulu
1	Manso	27	Goiânia	"Gravity"	✔	✔	✔	✔
2	Glícia França	29	Jaguarari	"Numa Sala de Reboco"	✔	—	—	✘
3	Paloma Maria	20	Salvador	"Master Blaster (Jammin')"	✔	✔	✔	✔
4	Alissan	33	Salvador	"Triste, Louca ou Má"	✔	—	—	✔
5	Gui Valença	34	Rio de Janeiro	"O Mundo é um Moinho"	—	—	✔	✔
6	Luana Marques	36	São Paulo	"Temporal de Amor"	—	✔	—	—
7	THEF	26	Monte Azul Paulista	"Tanto Faz"	✔	✔	✘	✔
8	Ana Castilho	21	Caraguatatuba	"Vienna"	—	—	—	—
9	Diva Menner	36	Recife	"Through the Fire"	✔	✔	✔	✔
10	Stephanie Luna	26	São Paulo	"Flames"	—	—	✔	—
11	Ana Carvalho	20	Araxá	"Onde Anda Você"	✔	✔	✔	✔
12	Rava	25	Rio de Janeiro	"Trem das Cores"	✔	—	—	—

=== Episode 5 (Oct. 29) ===
Order	Artist	Age	Hometown	Song	Coach's and contestant's choices			
Order	Artist	Age	Hometown	Song	Brown	Teló	Iza	Lulu
1	Victor Alves	20	Macaé	"Pra Você Acreditar"	✔	✔	✔	✔
2	Nath Porto	28	Belo Horizonte	"Idontwannabeyouanymore"	✔	✔	✔	✔
3	Stefanie Schirmbeck	37	Getúlio Vargas	"Na Sua Estante"	—	✔	—	—
4	Carla Sceno	27	Viçosa	"I Say a Little Prayer"	✔	—	✔	—
5	Sofia Moreno	30	Presidente Prudente	"Pense em Mim"	✔	✔	✔	—
6	Thaline Karajá	26	Santarém	"Banzeiro"	✔	—	—	—
7	Douglas Ramalho	30	Curitiba	"So Sick"	✔	✔	✘	✔
8	Nanda Lynn	26	Natal	"Meu Talismã"	—	—	✔	—
9	Sarah Céli	32	Votuporanga	"Je veux"	—	—	—	—
10	Natasha	21	Aracaju	"The Way You Make Me Feel"	✔	✔	✔	✔
11	Lawany	19	São Sebastião do Paraíso	"Menina Solta"	—	—	✔	✔
12	Bruna Daré	22	Presidente Prudente	"Olhos nos Olhos"	✔	—	—	—
13	Nathalia Barreto	30	Rio de Janeiro	"Love On Top"	—	—	—	✔

=== Episode 6 (Nov. 03) ===
Order	Artist	Age	Hometown	Song	Coach's and contestant's choices			
Order	Artist	Age	Hometown	Song	Brown	Teló	Iza	Lulu
1	Amanda Coronha	26	Rio de Janeiro	"Wicked Game"	✔	✔	✔	✔
2	Luana Granai	24	Jaú	"Flamingos"	✘	✔	✔	✔
3	Carlos Júnior	30	São Paulo	"Final de Tarde"	✔	—	—	—
4	Ana Canhoto	26	Bebedouro	"Scarborough Fair"	—	✔	—	—
5	Stanya	27	Cuiabá	"Dance Monkey"	✔	✔	✔	✔
6	Anne	21	Rio Bonito	"Arrastão"	—	—	—	—
7	Daniel Ribeiro	37	Belo Horizonte	"Change the World"	✔	✔	—	✔
8	Luiza Cruz	26	Belo Horizonte	"Não Existe Amor em SP"	—	✔	—	—
9	Madina Lyve	31	Salvador	"O Meu Amor"	✔	✔	—	—
10	Ed Souza	24	Santo Antônio do Jacinto	"Segredos"	Team full	✔	✔	✔
11	Gabi Porto	30	Rio de Janeiro	"Flutua"	Team full	✔	✔	Team full
12	Larissa Vitorino	39	Brasília	"Quero Ser Feliz Também"	Team full	✔	Team full	Team full

Non-competition performances
Order	Performers	Song
1	Carlinhos Brown, Michel Teló, Iza, Lulu Santos.	"Palco"

== The Battles ==
Key

	Artist won the Battle and advanced to the Live Showdowns
	Artist lost the Battle but was stolen by another coach and advanced to the Live Showdowns
	Artist lost the Battle and was eliminated
	Artist was disqualified from the competition
✘	Coach pressed "STEAL" button, but was "blocked" by Brown
✘	Coach pressed "STEAL" button, but was "blocked" by Teló
✘	Coach pressed "STEAL" button, but was "blocked" by Iza
✘	Coach pressed "STEAL" button, but was "blocked" by Lulu

Episode	Coach	Order	Winner	Song	Loser	Steal result			
Episode	Coach	Order	Winner	Song	Loser	Brown	Teló	Iza	Lulu
Episode 7 (November 5, 2020)	Iza	1	Bruna Black	"Você Não Entende Nada"	Aline Souza	✔	—	—N/a	—
Episode 7 (November 5, 2020)	Carlinhos Brown	2	Tibí	"Partilhar"	Rava	—N/a	—	✔	✘
Episode 7 (November 5, 2020)	Iza	3	Natasha	"Pesadão"	Daphne	—	—	—N/a	—
Episode 7 (November 5, 2020)	Lulu Santos	4	NAT	"Hurt"	Yesica Sales	—	—	—	—N/a
Episode 7 (November 5, 2020)	Carlinhos Brown	5	Simone Mazzer	"É"	Tecca Maris	—N/a	—	—	—
Episode 7 (November 5, 2020)	Michel Teló	6	Douglas Ramalho	"Lovely"	Ana Canhoto	✔	—N/a	✘	✔
Episode 8 (November 10, 2020)	Carlinhos Brown	1	Adma Andrade	"Eu Só Quero um Xodó"	Glícia França	—N/a	✔	✔	✔
Episode 8 (November 10, 2020)	Lulu Santos	2	João Marcelo Prevedel	"The Pretender"	Angel Sberse	✔	—	—	—N/a
Episode 8 (November 10, 2020)	Iza	3	Filipe Toca	"Pupila"	Mayra Rodrigues	—	—	—N/a	—
Episode 8 (November 10, 2020)	Carlinhos Brown	4	Cleane Sampaio	"Chorando Se Foi (Lambada)"	Madina Lyve	—N/a	—	—	—
Episode 8 (November 10, 2020)	Michel Teló	5	Luana Marques	"Luar do Sertão"	Sérgio Dorneles	–	—N/a	—	✔
Episode 8 (November 10, 2020)	Lulu Santos	6	THEF	"Sozinho"	Leyllane Carla	—	—	—	—N/a
Episode 9 (November 12, 2020)	Michel Teló	1	Thalita Maciente	"Supera"	Nanara Bello	—	—N/a	—	—
Episode 9 (November 12, 2020)	Lulu Santos	2	Ed Souza	"Paciência"	Nath Porto	—	—	✔	—N/a
Episode 9 (November 12, 2020)	Carlinhos Brown	3	Izrra	"Apaga a Luz"	Carlos Júnior	—N/a	—	—	—
Episode 9 (November 12, 2020)	Iza	4	Luciana Ribeiro	"Don't Start Now"	Stephanie Luna	—	✔	—N/a	—
Episode 9 (November 12, 2020)	Lulu Santos	5	Alana Sant	"1 Minuto"	Daniel Ribeiro	—	—	—	—N/a
Episode 9 (November 12, 2020)	Michel Teló	6	Sofia Moreno	"I Don't Want to Talk About It"	Stefanie Schirmbeck	—	—N/a	—	—
Episode 10 (November 17, 2020)	Iza	1	Luli	"Dangerous Woman"	Nanda Lynn	—	—	—N/a	—
Episode 10 (November 17, 2020)	Michel Teló	2	Érica Timóteo	"Mulher do Fim do Mundo"	Luiza Cruz	✔	—N/a	—	—
Episode 10 (November 17, 2020)	Lulu Santos	3	Lawany	"Café"	Gabriel Nogueira	Team full	—	—	—N/a
Episode 10 (November 17, 2020)	Carlinhos Brown	4	Thaline Karajá	"Divino Maravilhoso"	Alissan	Team full	—	—	—
Episode 10 (November 17, 2020)	Lulu Santos	5	Luana Granai	"Tangerina"	Paloma Maria	Team full	✘	✔	—N/a
Episode 10 (November 17, 2020)	Iza	6	Gui Valença	"Águas de Março"	Gabi Porto	Team full	—	Team full	—
Episode 10 (November 17, 2020)	Carlinhos Brown	7	Carla Sceno	"Human"	Karina Zeviani	Team full	—	Team full	—
Episode 11 (November 19, 2020)	Michel Teló	1	Fabiana Souto	Cancelled^{1}	Ana Carvalho	Team full	—	Team full	—
Episode 11 (November 19, 2020)	Carlinhos Brown	2	Amanda Coronha	"Hard Place"	Bruna Daré	Team full	✔	Team full	✔
Episode 11 (November 19, 2020)	Lulu Santos	3	Rick Santos	"Não Quero Mais"	Nathalia Barreto	Team full	Team full	Team full	—N/a
Episode 11 (November 19, 2020)	Michel Teló	4	Manso	"Take Me to Church"	Dan Gentil	Team full	Team full	Team full	✔
Episode 11 (November 19, 2020)	Iza	5	Victor Alves	"Se Eu Não Te Amasse..."	Anna Lima	Team full	Team full	Team full	Team full
Episode 11 (November 19, 2020)	Michel Teló	6	Larissa Vitorino	"Água de Beber"	Tamara Salles	Team full	Team full	Team full	Team full
Episode 11 (November 19, 2020)	Iza	7	Diva Menner	"Summertime"	Stanya	Team full	Team full	Team full	Team full

1. Fabiana Souto was paired with Ana Carvalho for the Battles, but due to having tested positive for COVID-19, Ana was disqualified. Therefore, the Battle was cancelled and Fabiana moved on by default.

Non-competition performances
Order	Performers	Song
7	Carlinhos Brown, Michel Teló, Iza, Lulu Santos.	"Anunciação"

== The Live Showdowns ==
Key

Artist won the Showdown and advanced to the Live Playoffs
Artist lost the Showdown and was eliminated

Episode	Coach	Order	Song	Artists		Song	Order
Episode	Coach	Order	Song	Winner(s)	Loser	Song	Order
Episode 12 (November 24, 2020)	Carlinhos Brown	1	"Ela Une Todas As Coisas"	Izrra	Simone Mazzer	"20 e Poucos Anos"	2
Episode 12 (November 24, 2020)	Lulu Santos	4	"Você Sempre Será"	Ana Canhoto	Alana Sant	"I Will Survive"	3
Episode 12 (November 24, 2020)	Lulu Santos	5	"Se Deus Me Ouvisse"	Ed Souza			
Episode 12 (November 24, 2020)	Iza	6	"Saving All My Love for You"	Diva Menner	Paloma Maria	"Romaria"	7
Episode 12 (November 24, 2020)	Lulu Santos	8	"Andar Sozinho"	Dan Gentil	Sérgio Dorneles	"Planeta Água"	9
Episode 13 (November 26, 2020)	Iza	1	"Pra Você Dar o Nome"	Bruna Black	Filipe Toca	"Me Abraça"	2
Episode 13 (November 26, 2020)	Michel Teló	4	"Chiclete com Banana"	Fabiana Souto	Bruna Daré	"Aos Nossos Filhos"	3
Episode 13 (November 26, 2020)	Michel Teló	5	"La Vie en rose"	Larissa Vitorino			
Episode 13 (November 26, 2020)	Lulu Santos	6	"Do It Like a Dude"	Luana Granai	NAT	"Meiga e Abusada"	7
Episode 13 (November 26, 2020)	Carlinhos Brown	8	"Relicário"	Amanda Coronha	Luiza Cruz	"Sorri, Sou Rei"	9
Episode 14 (December 1, 2020)	Carlinhos Brown	1	"Separação"	Aline Souza	Thaline Karajá	"O Canto da Cidade"	3
Episode 14 (December 1, 2020)	Carlinhos Brown	2	"Ain't No Other Man"	Carla Sceno			
Episode 14 (December 1, 2020)	Iza	4	"Começaria Tudo Outra Vez"	Gui Valença	Natasha	"Bixinho"	6
Episode 14 (December 1, 2020)	Iza	5	"Disk Me"	Luli			
Episode 14 (December 1, 2020)	Michel Teló^{2}	7	"93 Million Miles"	Manso	Sofia Moreno	"Saudade"	8
Episode 14 (December 1, 2020)	Michel Teló^{2}	9	"Deixa Ela Saber"	Thalita Maciente			
Episode 14 (December 1, 2020)	Carlinhos Brown	11	"Dancing on My Own"	Tibí	Adma Andrade	"Magamalabares"	10
Episode 14 (December 1, 2020)	Lulu Santos	12	"Canto de Ossanha"	João Marcelo Prevedel	Rick Santos	"A Lua e Eu"	13
Episode 15 (December 3, 2020)	Michel Teló	1	"Meu Abrigo"	Douglas Ramalho	Stephanie Luna	"Torn"	2
Episode 15 (December 3, 2020)	Carlinhos Brown	4	"Tropicana"	Cleane Sampaio	Angel Sberse	"Jump"	3
Episode 15 (December 3, 2020)	Iza^{2}	5	"Lost on You"	Luciana Ribeiro	Nath Porto	"Céu Azul"	6
Episode 15 (December 3, 2020)	Iza^{2}	7	"Um Dia, Um Adeus"	Victor Alves			
Episode 15 (December 3, 2020)	Michel Teló	9	"La Belle de Jour"	Glícia França	Érica Timóteo	"Conselho"	8
Episode 15 (December 3, 2020)	Lulu Santos	10	"You Are the Reason"	Lawany	THEF	"Clichê"	11

1. Luana Marques (Team Teló) and Rava (Team Iza) were disqualified after having tested positive for COVID-19. Therefore, the artists paired with them for the Showdowns were relocated into one additional trio for each team.

== Live shows ==
=== Elimination chart ===
Artist's info

- Team Brown
- Team Teló
- Team Iza
- Team Lulu

Result details

- Winner
- Runner-up
- Third place
- Fourth place
- Saved by the public
- Saved by the coach
- Advanced to the final
- Eliminated

Live show results per week
Artist	Week 1		Week 2	
Artist	Tuesday	Thursday	Tuesday	Thursday
Victor Alves		Safe	Advanced	Winner
Douglas Ramalho		Safe	Advanced	Runner-up
Izrra		Safe	Advanced	Third place
Ana Canhoto		Safe	Advanced	Fourth place
Amanda Coronha	Safe		Eliminated	Eliminated (week 2)
Carla Sceno		Safe	Eliminated	Eliminated (week 2)
Cleane Sampaio	Safe		Eliminated	Eliminated (week 2)
Dan Gentil	Safe		Eliminated	Eliminated (week 2)
Diva Menner		Safe	Eliminated	Eliminated (week 2)
Ed Souza		Safe	Eliminated	Eliminated (week 2)
Glícia França	Safe		Eliminated	Eliminated (week 2)
Larissa Vitorino		Safe	Eliminated	Eliminated (week 2)
Luana Granai	Safe		Eliminated	Eliminated (week 2)
Luciana Ribeiro	Safe		Eliminated	Eliminated (week 2)
Luli	Safe		Eliminated	Eliminated (week 2)
Manso	Safe		Eliminated	Eliminated (week 2)
Aline Souza		Eliminated	Eliminated (week 1)	
Gui Valença		Eliminated	Eliminated (week 1)	
Lawany		Eliminated	Eliminated (week 1)	
Thalita Maciente		Eliminated	Eliminated (week 1)	
Bruna Black	Eliminated	Eliminated (week 1)		
Fabiana Souto	Eliminated	Eliminated (week 1)		
João Marcelo Prevedel	Eliminated	Eliminated (week 1)		
Tibí	Eliminated	Eliminated (week 1)		

=== Week 1 ===
Live Playoffs 1

Episode	Coach	Order	Artist	Song	Result
Episode 16 (December 8, 2020)
Episode 16 (December 8, 2020)	Michel Teló	1	Fabiana Souto	"Expresso 2222"	Eliminated
Episode 16 (December 8, 2020)	Michel Teló	2	Glícia França	"Sábia"	Coach's choice
Episode 16 (December 8, 2020)	Michel Teló	3	Manso	"Blackbird"	Public's vote (45.04%)
Episode 16 (December 8, 2020)	Carlinhos Brown	4	Amanda Coronha	"Can't Take My Eyes Off You"	Coach's choice
Episode 16 (December 8, 2020)	Carlinhos Brown	5	Cleane Sampaio	"Disparada"	Public's vote (45.47%)
Episode 16 (December 8, 2020)	Carlinhos Brown	6	Tibí	"O Problema É Que Cê Sabe"	Eliminated
Episode 16 (December 8, 2020)	Iza	7	Bruna Black	"Flor de Lis"	Eliminated
Episode 16 (December 8, 2020)	Iza	8	Luciana Ribeiro	"I Put a Spell on You"	Public's vote (46.38%)
Episode 16 (December 8, 2020)	Iza	9	Luli	"Someone You Loved"	Coach's choice
Episode 16 (December 8, 2020)	Lulu Santos	10	Dan Gentil	"Dois Rios"	Public's vote (40.36%)
Episode 16 (December 8, 2020)	Lulu Santos	11	João Marcelo Prevedel	"Kill My Mind"	Eliminated
Episode 16 (December 8, 2020)	Lulu Santos	12	Luana Granai	"Arte"	Coach's choice

Live Playoffs 2

Episode	Coach	Order	Artist	Song	Result
Episode 17 (December 10, 2020)
Episode 17 (December 10, 2020)	Carlinhos Brown	1	Aline Souza	"Deixa Tudo Como Tá"	Eliminated
Episode 17 (December 10, 2020)	Carlinhos Brown	2	Carla Sceno	"You Are the Sunshine of My Life"	Coach's choice
Episode 17 (December 10, 2020)	Carlinhos Brown	3	Izrra	"Bem Querer"	Public's vote (49.61%)
Episode 17 (December 10, 2020)	Michel Teló	4	Douglas Ramalho	"Stay with Me"	Public's vote (45.12%)
Episode 17 (December 10, 2020)	Michel Teló	5	Larissa Vitorino	"Wonderwall"	Coach's choice
Episode 17 (December 10, 2020)	Michel Teló	6	Thalita Maciente	"Quero Você do Jeito Que Quiser"	Eliminated
Episode 17 (December 10, 2020)	Lulu Santos	7	Ana Canhoto	"Your Song"	Coach's choice
Episode 17 (December 10, 2020)	Lulu Santos	8	Ed Souza	"Sina"	Public's vote (64.94%)
Episode 17 (December 10, 2020)	Lulu Santos	9	Lawany	"Vira Homem"	Eliminated
Episode 17 (December 10, 2020)	Iza	10	Diva Menner	"A Carne"	Public's vote (45.40%)
Episode 17 (December 10, 2020)	Iza	11	Gui Valença	"Smooth"	Eliminated
Episode 17 (December 10, 2020)	Iza	12	Victor Alves	"Atrasadinha"	Coach's choice

=== Week 2 ===
Semifinals

Episode	Coach	Order	Artist	Song	Result		
Episode	Coach	Order	Artist	Song	Public points	Coach points	Total points
Episode 18 (December 15, 2020)
Episode 18 (December 15, 2020)	Carlinhos Brown	1	Amanda Coronha	"Lança Perfume"	11.20	00.00	11.20
Episode 18 (December 15, 2020)	Carlinhos Brown	2	Carla Sceno	"September"	27.24	00.00	27.24
Episode 18 (December 15, 2020)	Carlinhos Brown	3	Cleane Sampaio	"Quando a Chuva Passar"	25.14	00.00	25.14
Episode 18 (December 15, 2020)	Carlinhos Brown	4	Izrra	"Zero"	36.42	20.00	56.42
Episode 18 (December 15, 2020)	Lulu Santos	5	Ana Canhoto	"Piloto Automático"	20.18	20.00	40.18
Episode 18 (December 15, 2020)	Lulu Santos	6	Dan Gentil	"Upside Down"	19.99	00.00	19.99
Episode 18 (December 15, 2020)	Lulu Santos	7	Ed Souza	"Como Vai Você"	39.98	00.00	39.98
Episode 18 (December 15, 2020)	Lulu Santos	8	Luana Granai	"Bang Bang"	19.85	00.00	19.85
Episode 18 (December 15, 2020)	Iza	9	Diva Menner	"At Last"	35.02	00.00	35.02
Episode 18 (December 15, 2020)	Iza	10	Luciana Ribeiro	"Skyfall"	25.58	00.00	25.58
Episode 18 (December 15, 2020)	Iza	11	Luli	"Born This Way"	09.00	00.00	09.00
Episode 18 (December 15, 2020)	Iza	12	Victor Alves	"Péssimo Negócio"	30.40	20.00	50.40
Episode 18 (December 15, 2020)	Michel Teló	13	Douglas Ramalho	"Ribbon in the Sky"	22.09	20.00	42.09
Episode 18 (December 15, 2020)	Michel Teló	14	Glícia França	"A Menina Dança"	22.37	00.00	22.37
Episode 18 (December 15, 2020)	Michel Teló	15	Larissa Vitorino	"Esqueça (Forget Him)"	32.99	00.00	32.99
Episode 18 (December 15, 2020)	Michel Teló	16	Manso	"Desconstrução"	22.55	00.00	22.55

Finals

Episode	Coach	Artist	Order	Song	Order	Song	Result
Episode 19 (December 17, 2020)
Episode 19 (December 17, 2020)	Lulu Santos	Ana Canhoto	1	"My Heart Will Go On"	5	"Velha Infância"	Fourth place (20%)
Episode 19 (December 17, 2020)	Michel Teló	Douglas Ramalho	2	"Eu Sei Que Vou Te Amar"	6	"Say You Won't Let Go"	Runner-up (26%)
Episode 19 (December 17, 2020)	Carlinhos Brown	Izrra	3	"Saudade Daquilo"	7	"Você é Linda"	Third place (20%)
Episode 19 (December 17, 2020)	Iza	Victor Alves	4	"Graveto"	8	"Diamonds"	Winner (34%)

== Ratings and reception ==
=== Brazilian ratings ===
All numbers are in points and provided by Kantar Ibope Media.

Episode	Title	Air date	Timeslot	SP viewers (in points)	Source
1	The Blind Auditions 1	October 15, 2020	Thursday 11:00 p.m.	16.9	
2	The Blind Auditions 2	October 20, 2020	Tuesday 11:00 p.m.	16.7	
3	The Blind Auditions 3	October 22, 2020	Thursday 11:00 p.m.	17.9	
4	The Blind Auditions 4	October 27, 2020	Tuesday 11:00 p.m.	17.1	
5	The Blind Auditions 5	October 29, 2020	Thursday 11:00 p.m.	16.8	
6	The Blind Auditions 6	November 3, 2020	Tuesday 11:00 p.m.	15.8	
7	The Battles 1	November 5, 2020	Thursday 11:00 p.m.	19.4	
8	The Battles 2	November 10, 2020	Tuesday 11:00 p.m.	16.7	
9	The Battles 3	November 12, 2020	Thursday 11:00 p.m.	17.4	
10	The Battles 4	November 17, 2020	Tuesday 11:00 p.m.	16.6	
11	The Battles 5	November 19, 2020	Thursday 11:00 p.m.	16.4	
12	Live Showdown 1	November 24, 2020	Tuesday 11:00 p.m.	15.1	
13	Live Showdown 2	November 26, 2020	Thursday 11:00 p.m.	14.2	
14	Live Showdown 3	December 1, 2020	Tuesday 11:00 p.m.	14.2	
15	Live Showdown 4	December 3, 2020	Thursday 11:00 p.m.	16.5	
16	Live Playoffs 1	December 8, 2020	Tuesday 11:00 p.m.	13.8	
17	Live Playoffs 2	December 10, 2020	Thursday 11:00 p.m.	16.7	
18	Semifinals	December 15, 2020	Tuesday 11:00 p.m.	13.8	
19	Finals	December 17, 2020	Thursday 11:00 p.m.	15.4	
20	Christmas Special	December 24, 2020	Thursday 11:00 p.m.		

- In 2020, each point represents 254.892 households in 15 market cities in Brazil (73.015 households in São Paulo).
