= Vitão (singer) =

Brazilian singer-songwriter

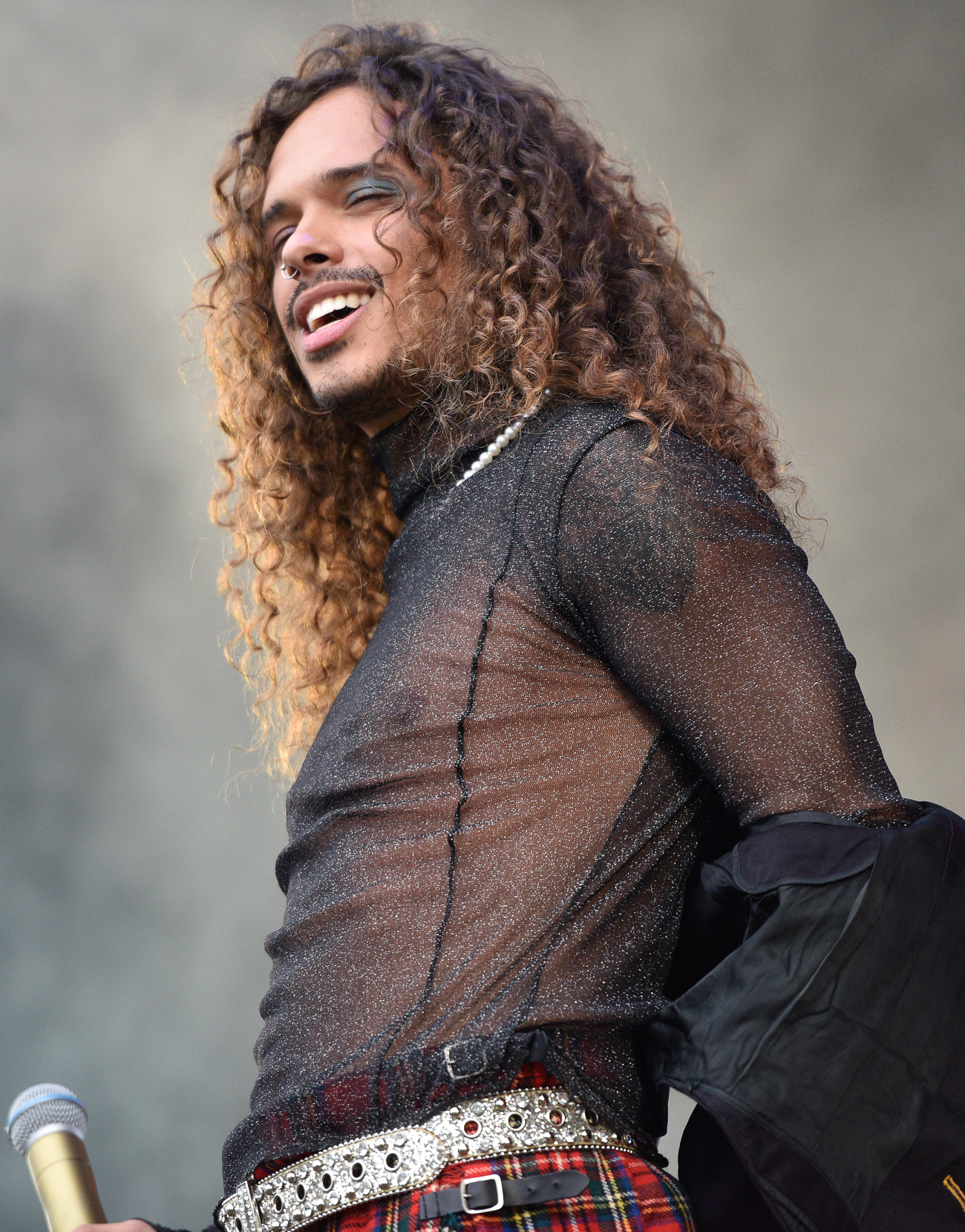
- Born: Victor Carvalho Ferreira; 18 August 1999
- Partner: Luísa Sonza

Víctor Carvalho Ferreira (São Paulo, 18 August 1999), also known as Vitão, is a Brazilian songwriter, trapper and singer.

== Biography ==
He ended his music career in 2016, producing cover songs, which caught the attention of his future label, Head Media. In March 2019, he released his first self-titled EP and was soon invited to feature on a song with Projota, "Sei Lá," which was certified diamond by Pro-Música Brasil for sales of 300,000 units in Brazil. On 17 January 2020, he released his second studio EP, "Ouro."

== Personal life ==
Between November 2018 and September 2019, Vitão dated actress Thaylise Pivato. Between September 2020 and August 2021, he dated singer Luísa Sonza. Since 2022, Vitão has been dating fellow singer Lou Garcia.

Vitão said he sees himself as beyond labels, rejecting being categorized as straight, gay, or bisexual.
