= Potengi, Ceará =

Municipality in Ceará, Brazil

Coordinates: 7.09083°S 40.0269°W

Potengi
- Municipality
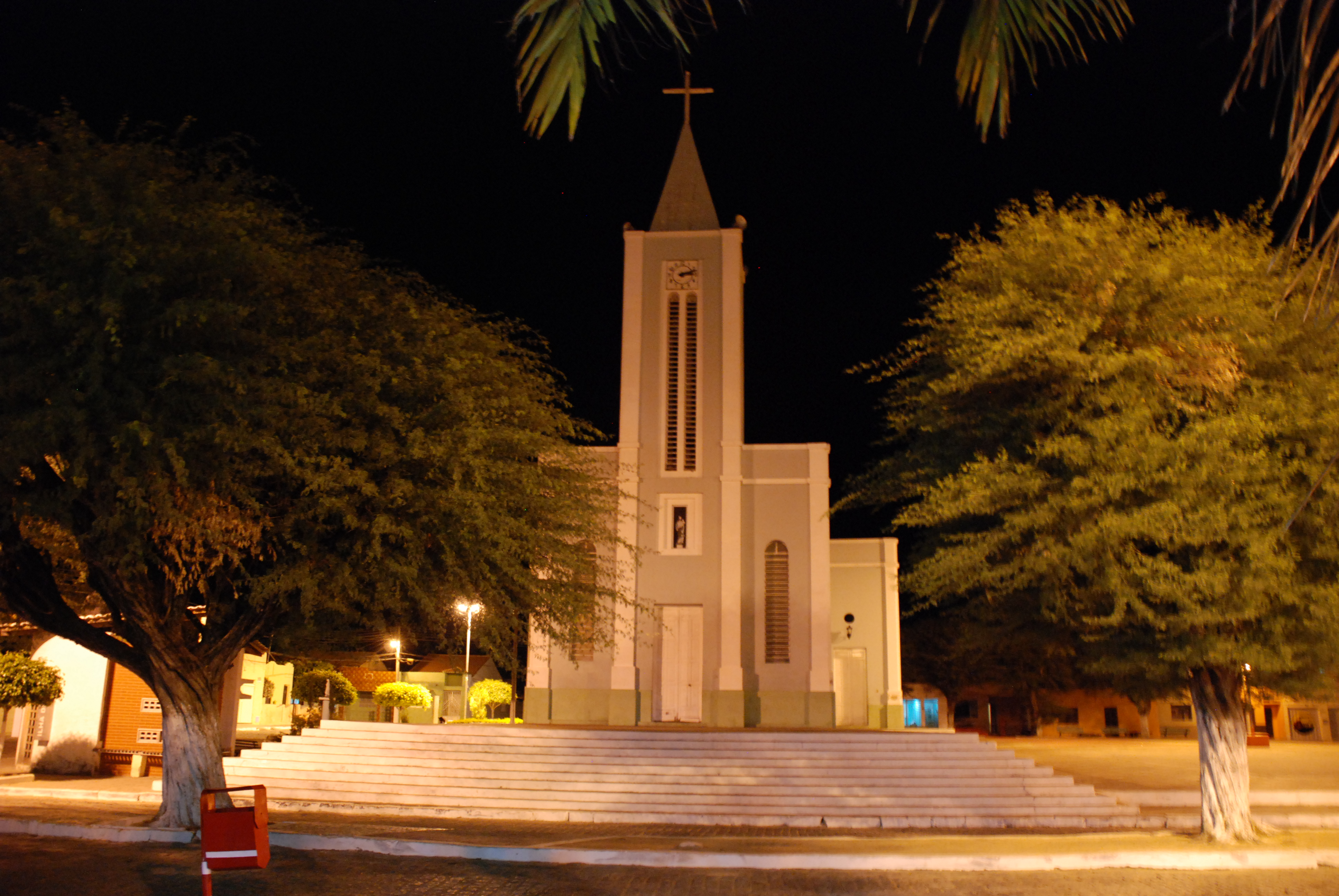

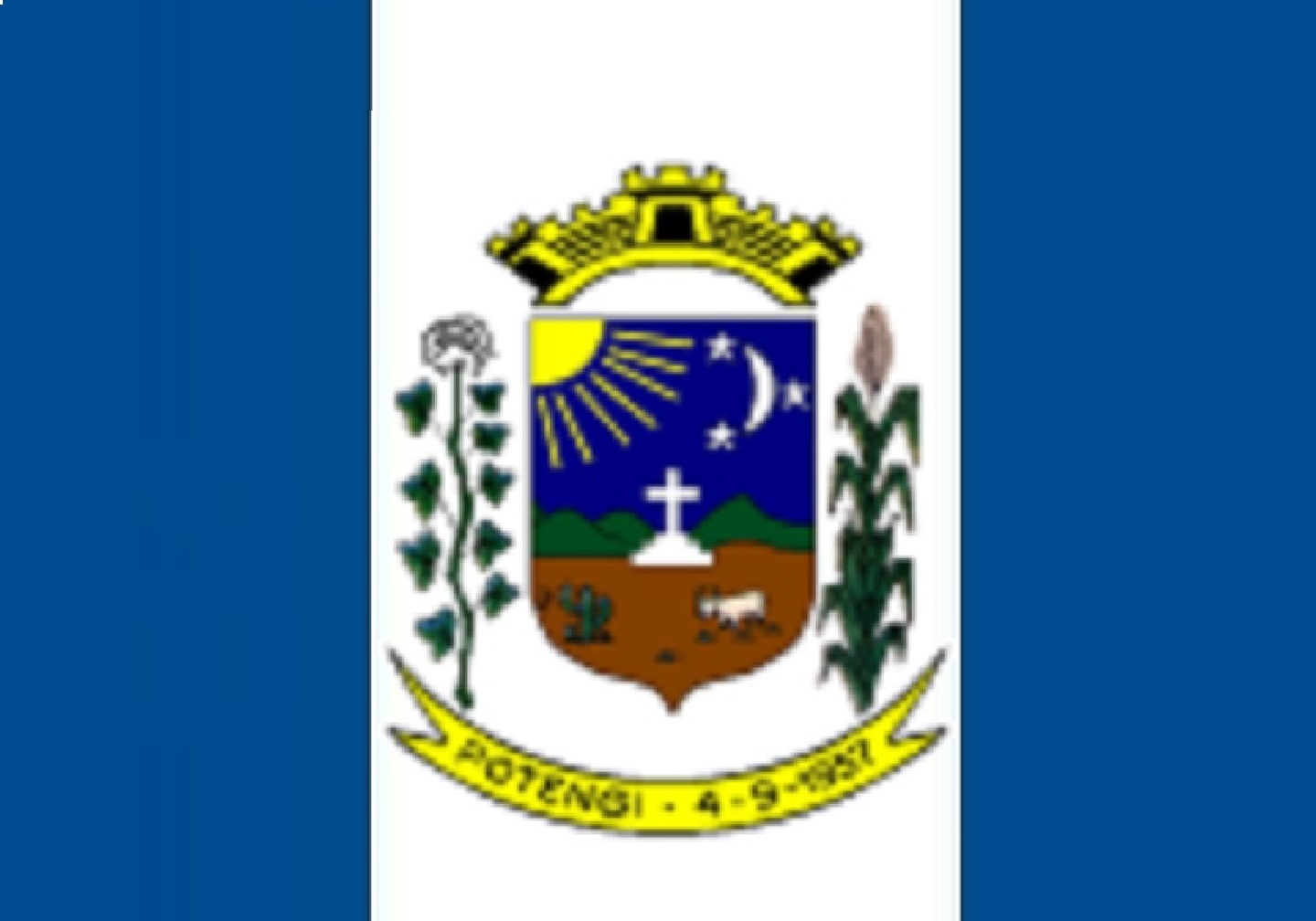
- Flag
- Interactive map of Potengi
- Country: Brazil
- Region: Nordeste
- State: Ceará
- Mesoregion: Sul Cearense

Population (2020)
  - Total: 11,106
- Time zone: UTC−3 (BRT)

Potengi is a municipality in the state of Ceará in the Northeast region of Brazil.

== See also ==
- List of municipalities in Ceará
